= List of The Late Late Show with Craig Ferguson episodes =

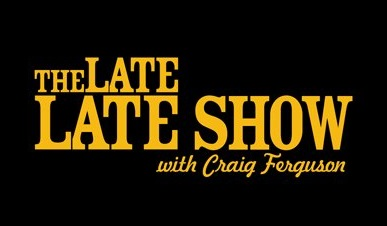

The Late Late Show with Craig Ferguson is an American late-night talk show that aired weeknights at 12:37 am (Los Angeles time) on CBS in the United States from January 3, 2005, to December 19, 2014. The hour-long show was hosted by Scottish American comedian, actor and author Craig Ferguson, with his animatronic robot skeleton sidekick Geoff Peterson (voiced by Josh Robert Thompson) and featuring Secretariat, a pantomime horse. The show's writers and other staff appeared in skits and as themselves occasionally, with show producer Michael Naidus becoming a regular. 2,058 episodes were produced.

== 2005 ==
=== January ===
No.	Original release date	Guest(s)	Musical/entertainment guest(s)
1	January 3, 2005	David Duchovny, Nicole Sullivan	N/A
One of Ferguson's first guests is Nicole Sullivan, coincidentally the first woman Ferguson dated when he came to the United States from Scotland in 1994.
2	January 4, 2005	Jon Cryer, Sophie Okonedo	Keb' Mo'
3	January 5, 2005	Julian McMahon, Aisha Tyler	Howie Day performed "Colide" from Stop All the World Now
4	January 6, 2005	Jason Alexander, Hau Thai-Tang	The Donnas performed "I Don't Want to Know (If You Don't Want Me)" from Gold Medal
5	January 7, 2005	Jeremy Piven	G. Love
6	January 10, 2005	John Goodman, Emmy Rossum	N/A
Ferguson performed in a sketch as Super Mario.
7	January 11, 2005	Little Richard, William H. Macy	Little Richard performs "Baby What You Want Me to Do" from 1966's The Wild and Frantic Little Richard, and "Tutti Frutti" from 1955's Here's Little Richard
8	January 12, 2005	James Woods, Amanda Bynes	Comedian Jim Short
9	January 13, 2005	Teri Polo, Eddie Steeples	Wyclef Jean
10	January 14, 2005	Patricia Arquette, Peter Guber, Peter Bart	N/A
11	January 17, 2005	Renée Fleming	Mos Def performs "The Painties" from The New Danger
12	January 18, 2005	Regis Philbin, Rob Morrow	Billy Bragg performs ""Waiting for the Great Leap Forwards" from Workers Playtime
13	January 19, 2005	Minnie Driver, Candace Bushnell	N/A
14	January 20, 2005	Samuel L. Jackson, Maria Bello	Collective Soul performs "How Do You Love" from Youth
15	January 21, 2005	Tara Reid, Crispin Glover	The Ditty Bops perform "There's a Girl" from their self-titled album
16	January 24, 2005	Jim Belushi, Kim Raver	DramaGods perform "So'k" from Love
17	January 25, 2005	Famke Janssen, Joe Montana	Comedian Richard Jeni
18	January 26, 2005	Blythe Danner	Comedian Stewart Francis
19	January 27, 2005	Ice Cube, Steve Jones	French Kicks perform the title track from The Trial of the Century
20	January 28, 2005	Vanessa L. Williams, Scott Wolf	Razorlight performs "Somewhere Else" from Up All Night
21	January 31, 2005	Katey Sagal, Christine Barrett, Jake Shears	Scissor Sisters performed "Filthy/Gorgeous" from their self-titled album

=== February ===
No.	Original release date	Guest(s)	Musical/entertainment guest(s)
22	February 1, 2005	John Larroquette, Jennifer Finnigan	Comedian Rickey Smiley
23	February 2, 2005	Joe Mantegna, Stan Lee	Emma Bunton perform "Crickets Sing for Anamaria"
24	February 3, 2005	Peter Gallagher, Laila Ali	...And You Will Know Us by the Trail of Dead perform "The Rest Will Follow" from Worlds Apart
25	February 4, 2005	Jeff Gordon, Philip Daniel Bolden	Comedian Andrew Donnelly
26	February 7, 2005	Patti LaBelle, Imelda Staunton	Night Ranger perform "Sister Christian" from Midnight Madness
27	February 8, 2005	Randy Jackson, Samantha Daniels	Comedian Greg Proops
28	February 9, 2005	Laura Linney, Barry Watson, Laura Margolis, Kevin O'Connell	N/A
29	February 10, 2005	Star Jones, Amber Valletta	The Zutons perform "Confusion" from Who Killed...... The Zutons?
30	February 11, 2005	Alan Alda, Tori Spelling	Steve Earle performs "The Revolution Starts" from The Revolution Starts... Now
31	February 14, 2005	Jane Seymour, Paul Haggis	Bright Eyes perform "Road to Joy" from I'm Wide Awake, It's Morning
32	February 15, 2005	Mimi Rogers, James Denton, Courtney Hansen	N/A
33	February 16, 2005	Jennifer Beals, David Krumholtz	Interpol perform "Evil" from Antics
34	February 17, 2005	Sean Astin, Kathryn Morris	Madeleine Peyroux performs "Dance Me to the End of Love" from Careless Love
35	February 18, 2005	Julian Fellowes, Janet Ferguson, Andy Dick,	Comedian Paul Gilmartin
Ferguson's mother, Janet Ferguson visits LA sites with Wu Tang Clan's RZA
36	February 21, 2005	Bob Schieffer, John C. McGinley	Ani DiFranco performs "Recoil" from Knuckle Down
37	February 22, 2005	Peter Boyle, Jenna Morasca, Ethan Zohn	Brian McKnight performs "Everything I Do" from Gemini
38	February 23, 2005	Thomas Haden Church, Don King	Comedienne Maria Bamford
39	February 24, 2005	Jami Gertz, Steven Wright	Sum 41 perform "No Reason" from Chuck
40	February 25, 2005	Faye Dunaway, Andrew Wight	Nuttin' But Stringz perform the title track from Dance with My Father
41	February 28, 2005	Amy Brenneman	Paul Westerberg performs "As Far as I Know" from Another Year on the Streets, Vol. 3

=== March ===
No.	Original release date	Guest(s)	Musical/entertainment guest(s)
42	March 1, 2005	Don Rickles, Missy Elliott	Judith Owen performs "These Foolish Things"
43	March 2, 2005	Jeff Probst, Emily Mortimer	Comedian Danny Bhoy
44	March 3, 2005	Juliette Binoche, Lara Logan, Stanley Bing	N/A
45	March 4, 2005	Jennifer Love Hewitt, Dave Foley, Ali Costello	Unwritten Law performs "Save Me (Wake Up Call)" from Here's to the Mourning
46	March 14, 2005	Joan Collins, Phil Keoghan	The Blue Nile performs "I Would Never" from High
47	March 15, 2005	Drew Carey, Lawrence Block	The Hollow Men perform "Pink Panther"
48	March 16, 2005	Kevin Pollak, Maureen Dowd	Deana Carter performs "One Day at a Time" from The Story of My Life
49	March 21, 2005	Michael Chiklis, Tony Hawk	Nic Armstrong & The Thieves performed "I Can't Stand It"
50	March 22, 2005	Sam Elliott, Amy Yasbeck	Comedian Bob Marley
51	March 23, 2005	Andie MacDowell, Gerard Butler	Kathleen Edwards performs the title track from Back to Me
52	March 28, 2005	Wendie Malick, Chris Klug	Lisa Loeb performs "Catch the Moon" from The Way It Really Is
53	March 29, 2005	Robert Rodriguez, Stone Cold Steve Austin	k-os performs "Crabbuckit" from Joyful Rebellion
54	March 30, 2005	Carmen Electra, Nick Stahl	Lang Lang
55	March 31, 2005	Bernie Mac, Mädchen Amick, Rachael Scdoris	N/A

=== April ===
No.	Original release date	Guest(s)	Musical/entertainment guest(s)
56	April 1, 2005	Carla Gugino, Regina King, Elon Gold	N/A
57	April 4, 2005	Jimmy Smits	Moby performs "Lift Me Up" from Hotel
58	April 5, 2005	Michael Clarke Duncan, Mary McCormack	Comedienne Becky Pedigo
59	April 6, 2005	Ron Livingston, Dave Gorman	Jesse McCartney performs "She's No You" from Beautiful Soul
60	April 11, 2005	Amber Tamblyn, Jason Lee, Steven Hensley	N/A
61	April 12, 2005	Eric Idle, Rulon Gardner	Comedian Mike Birbiglia
62	April 13, 2005	Sara Rue, Matthew Polly	Aqualung performs "Brighter Than Sunshine" from Still Life
63	April 14, 2005	Fran Drescher, Anton Yelchin	Shooter Jennings performs "4th of July" from Put the "O" Back in Country
64	April 15, 2005	David Duchovny, Ryan Reynolds	Dinosaur Jr. performs "The Lung" from You're Living All Over Me
65	April 25, 2005	Suzanne Somers, Erykah Badu, Billy Miles	N/A
66	April 26, 2005	Thandie Newton, Barb MacLeod	N/A
67	April 27, 2005	Paul Haggis, Michael Gelbart	Gavin Rossdale performs "The Current" from The Complex
68	April 28, 2005	Rosie O'Donnell, Akiane Kramarik	N/A
69	April 29, 2005	Anjelica Huston, Danny Pino	The Futureheads perform "Hounds of Love" from their self-titled album

=== May ===
No.	Original release date	Guest(s)	Musical/entertainment guest(s)
70	May 2, 2005	Jonathan Rhys Meyers, Ben Stein	Kasabian performs "Cutt Off" from their self-titled album
71	May 3, 2005	Bill Maher, Rain Pryor	Comedian Stewart Francis
72	May 4, 2005	Gary Sinise, Dean Karnazes	Ben Folds performs "Landed" from Songs for Silverman
73	May 5, 2005	Ozzy Osbourne, Allison DuBois	Brendan Benson performs "What I'm Looking For" from The Alternative to Love
74	May 6, 2005	Jim Caviezel, Phil Lesh	Eels performs "Hey Man (Now You're Really Living)" from Blinking Lights and Other Revelations
75	May 9, 2005	Mark Harmon, Rza	Joss Stone performs "Spoiled" from Mind, Body & Soul
76	May 10, 2005	Rose McGowan, Dr. Sanjay Gupta	Charlie Daniels performs a song from Songs From the Longleaf Pines
77	May 11, 2005	Kermit the Frog, Leelee Sobieski	Tori Amos performs "Sleeps with Butterflies" from The Beekeeper
78	May 12, 2005	Bill Pullman, Ruth Reichl	Spoon performs "Sister Jack" from Gimme Fiction
79	May 13, 2005	Wanda Sykes, Eric Bogosian	N/A
80	May 16, 2005	Mike Huckabee, Marlee Matlin	John Butler Trio performs "Something's Gotta Give"
81	May 17, 2005	Joe Walsh, George Eads	Junior Brown performs a song from Down Home Chrome
82	May 18, 2005	Sela Ward, Michael Tucker	Acceptance performs "In Too Fair" from Phantoms
83	May 19, 2005	Phil McGraw	Ringside performs "Tired of Being Sorry" from their self-titled album
84	May 20, 2005	Randy Jackson, Bai Ling, Gary Greff	N/A
85	May 23, 2005	Ann Coulter, Amber Mariano, Rob Mariano	Comedian Charles Ross
86	May 24, 2005	Alice Cooper, Malachy McCourt	Dierks Bentley performs "Settle for a Slowdown" from Modern Day Drifter
87	May 25, 2005	Donny Osmond, Peter Bart	Robert Cray performs the title track from Twenty
88	May 26, 2005	Rachael Leigh Cook, Chuck Palahniuk	Layzie Bone performs a song from The New Revolution
89	May 27, 2005	Seth Green, Tony Alva	The Daylights perform a song from Shift and Blur

=== June ===
No.	Original release date	Guest(s)	Musical/entertainment guest(s)
90	June 6, 2005	Jon Cryer, Garrison Keillor	Sound of Urchin performs a song from The Diamond
91	June 7, 2005	Marg Helgenberger, David Milch	Jaguares performs a song from Crónicas de un Laberinto
92	June 8, 2005	Dennis Hopper, Marianne Jean-Baptiste	Comedian Carlos Alazraqui
93	June 9, 2005	Ricky Schroder	Toby Keith performs "Honkytonk U" from Honkytonk University
94	June 10, 2005	Vivica A. Fox, Poppy Montgomery	Angie Stone performs "U-Haul" from Stone Love
95	June 13, 2005	Jason Lee, Drew Pinsky	Midlake performs "Mornings Will Be Kind"
96	June 14, 2005	Cheryl Ladd, Skeet Ulrich	Kaiser Chiefs performs "Everyday I Love You Less and Less"
97	June 15, 2005	Steven Wright, John F. Banzhaf III; Skit with James Adomian as George W. Bush	Comedian Steven Wright; Amos Lee performs "Keep It Loose, Keep It Tight" from his eponymous album
98	June 16, 2005	Tommy Hilfiger, Lea Thompson	Nikka Costa performs "Till I Get to You" from Can'tneverdidnothin'
99	June 17, 2005	Debbie Reynolds, Thomas Lennon, Nick Hornby	TBA
100	June 20, 2005	Allison Janney, Julian Sands	Rilo Kiley performs a song from More Adventurous
101	June 21, 2005	Peter Krause, David LaChapelle	Tracy Bonham performs "Shine" from Blink the Brightest
"Host-whisperer" Peter Lassally, veteran producer of The Tonight Show Starring Johnny Carson and for David Letterman takes over the day-to-day running of the show as executive producer. Lassally was largely responsible for hiring Ferguson and had been coaching him in his new role.
102	June 22, 2005	John Waters, Loretta Devine	Comedian Demetri Martin
103	June 23, 2005	Mimi Rogers, James Ellroy	Brooke Valentine performs "Girlfight" from Chain Letter
104	June 24, 2005	Jeremy Piven, Melissa Bank	Mike Jones performs "Flossin" from Who Is Mike Jones?
105	June 27, 2005	Bryan Cranston, Peter Guber	The Krumpers perform a dance routine
106	June 28, 2005	Amy Yasbeck, Ringo Starr	Ringo Starr and His All-Starr Band perform the title track from "Choose Love" and "I'm the Greatest" from his 1973 album Ringo
107	June 29, 2005	Kara Cooney	Dwight Yoakam perform a song from Blame the Vain
108	June 30, 2005	Jennifer Tilly, Corbin Bernsen, Leroy Chiao	TBA

=== July ===
No.	Original release date	Guest(s)	Musical/entertainment guest(s)
109	July 1, 2005	Tom Bergeron, Greg Nicotero	Billy Bragg performs a song from Volume 1
110	July 11, 2005	Julian McMahon, Rachel DeWoskin	The Crystal Method performs a song from Legion of Boom.
111	July 12, 2005	Dave Navarro, Marisa Marchetto	Comedian Ron Pearson
112	July 13, 2005	Tony Shalhoub, Jared Diamond	Raul Midón performs a song from State of Mind
113	July 14, 2005	Beau Bridges, Harry Eden	Comedienne Martha Kelly
114	July 15, 2005	John Larroquette, Dan Huber	Fountains of Wayne performs a song from Out-of-State Plates
115	July 18, 2005	Wolf Blitzer, Karina Lombard	Nellie McKay performs "Pasadena Girl" from the soundtrack of Rumor Has It...
116	July 19, 2005	Ludacris, Julie Warner	Comedian Ty Barnett
117	July 20, 2005	Dave Foley, Marc Horowitz	Tionne "T-Boz" Watkins and Rozonda "Chilli" Thomas from R U the Girl
118	July 21, 2005	Warren Faidley, Martin Mull	Chef Preston Clarke
119	July 22, 2005	Camryn Manheim, Elizabeth Banks	Crossfade performs "So Far Away" from Crossfade
120	July 25, 2005	Eddie Izzard, R. James Woolsey Jr.	Elkland performs a song from Golden
121	July 26, 2005	Peter Arnett, Isla Fisher	Comedienne Wendy Liebman
122	July 27, 2005	Joe Buck, Pauley Perrette	N/A
123	July 28, 2005	Dermot Mulroney, Paul Feig	N/A

=== August ===
No.	Original release date	Guest(s)	Musical/entertainment guest(s)
124	August 1, 2005	Cloris Leachman, Mark Zupan	Comedian Carlos Mencia
125	August 2, 2005	Jane Kaczmarek, John Carroll Lynch	Comedian Greg Proops
126	August 3, 2005	Joseph Fiennes, Julie Chen	Tracy Bonham performs "Did I Sleep Through It All?" from Blink the Brightest
127	August 4, 2005	Sharon Stone, Mo'Nique	N/A
128	August 5, 2005	Buzz Aldrin, Method Man, John Mendoza	N/A
129	August 8, 2005	Marilu Henner, David Feherty	N/A
130	August 9, 2005	Harland Williams, Evan Rachel Wood	Babyface performs the single "Reason for Breathing"
131	August 10, 2005	Kristin Chenoweth, Marc Cherry	Natasha Bedingfield performs "I Bruise Easily" from Unwritten
132	August 15, 2005	Hank Azaria, Wes Craven	N/A
133	August 16, 2005	Rachel Griffiths, Tommy Lasorda	Comedian D. C. Benny
134	August 17, 2005	Arianna Huffington, Gigi Grazer	Comedian Louis C.K.
135	August 18, 2005	Jami Gertz, Steve Howey	Missy Higgins performs the title track from The Sound of White
136	August 19, 2005	Steve Carell, Rashida Jones, Rick Lundblade	N/A
137	August 22, 2005	Carl Reiner, Rosa Blasi	Rufus Wainwright performs "The One You Love" from Want Two
138	August 23, 2005	Minnie Driver, Todd Zeile	N/A
139	August 24, 2005	Eric McCormack, Mitch Albom	N/A
140	August 25, 2005	Carrie Fisher, Terry McDermott	Our Lady Peace performs "Where Are You" from Healthy in Paranoid Times
141	August 26, 2005	Felicity Huffman, Stanley Bing	Last Train Home performs

=== September ===
No.	Original release date	Guest(s)	Musical/entertainment guest(s)
142	September 12, 2005	Neil Patrick Harris, Karen Fisher	Nickel Creek
143	September 13, 2005	Bruce Campbell, Melinda Clarke	Flight of the Conchords
144	September 14, 2005	Patricia Arquette, Connie Schultz	Paul Weller
145	September 15, 2005	Carla Gugino, Alice Cooper	N/A
146	September 16, 2005	Alyson Hannigan, Steve Jones	N/A
147	September 19, 2005	Cybill Shepherd, Phil Keoghan	Institute
148	September 20, 2005	Tyra Banks, Tyler James Williams	Ted Alexandro
149	September 21, 2005	Nick Cannon, Jeff Probst, Lawrence Turman	N/A
150	September 22, 2005	Aisha Tyler, Seth MacFarlane	Thirty Seconds to Mars
151	September 23, 2005	Susan Sarandon, Tom Everett Scott	INXS
152	September 26, 2005	Danny Bonaduce, Diane Farr	Shaggy
153	September 27, 2005	Maria Bello, Jason Segel	N/A
154	September 28, 2005	Alan Alda, Jennifer Coolidge	N/A
155	September 29, 2005	Fran Drescher, Robert David Hall	Jo Dee Messina
156	September 30, 2005	Toni Collette, Dave Price	Robert Plant & Strange Sensation

=== October ===
No.	Original release date	Guest(s)	Musical/entertainment guest(s)
157	October 3, 2005	Julian McMahon, Jennifer Finnigan	North Mississippi Allstars
158	October 4, 2005	Taryn Manning, Dr. Drew	Butch Bradley
159	October 5, 2005	David Duchovny	Sinéad O'Connor
160	October 6, 2005	Henry Winkler, Aron Ralston	Julie Gribble
161	October 7, 2005	Illeana Douglas	Macy Gray
162	October 10, 2005	Macy Gray, Nuala O'Faolain	Rihanna
163	October 11, 2005	Dennis Hopper, Cheryl Hines	Sarge
164	October 12, 2005	Joe Mantegna, Sue Johanson	N/A
165	October 13, 2005	Sanjay Gupta, Stephen Collins	N/A
166	October 14, 2005	Bill Nye, Kevin Bacon & Michael Bacon	Bacon Brothers
167	October 17, 2005	Joely Fisher, McG	Switchfoot
168	October 18, 2005	Melina Kanakaredes, Stephen Robinson	N/A
169	October 19, 2005	Betty White, Rhona Mitra	Ray J
170	October 20, 2005	Stockard Channing, Michael Connelly	Jamie Cullum
171	October 21, 2005	Jason Schwartzman, Mitch Braswell	Paul Weller
172	October 31, 2005	Sharon Osbourne	N/A

=== November ===
No.	Original release date	Guest(s)	Musical/entertainment guest(s)
173	November 1, 2005	Maria Bartiromo, Jamie Kaler	Clint Black
174	November 2, 2005	Anthony LaPaglia, Jeri Ryan	N/A
175	November 3, 2005	Charlie Sheen, Marissa Jaret Winokur	Franz Ferdinand
176	November 4, 2005	Gina Gershon, Rob Zombie	Sinéad O'Connor
177	November 7, 2005	Hugh Laurie, Twiggy	Patty Loveless
178	November 8, 2005	Brenda Blethyn, Jim Sheridan	John Roy
179	November 9, 2005	John Leguizamo, Kara Cooney	My Morning Jacket
180	November 10, 2005	John Malkovich	N/A
181	November 11, 2005	Xzibit, Doug Savant	Buddy Guy
182	November 14, 2005	James Belushi, Parminder Nagra	Matisyahu
183	November 15, 2005	Patti Smith, John Lahr	N/A
184	November 16, 2005	Anne Heche, Tom Amandes	Jay Larson
185	November 17, 2005	RZA, Josh Schwartz	Amos Lee
186	November 18, 2005	Jon Favreau, Randy Cohen	Maz Jobrani
187	November 21, 2005	Juliette Lewis, Brian Van Holt	Juliette and the Licks
188	November 22, 2005	Jerry O'Connell, Joely Richardson	The Fray
189	November 23, 2005	Regis Philbin, Maureen Dowd	N/A
190	November 24, 2005	Jennifer Love Hewitt, James Denton	Robert Plant
191	November 25, 2005	Danny Bonaduce, Paul Haggis	N/A
192	November 28, 2005	Ted Danson, Kristen Bell	Matt Fulchiron
193	November 29, 2005	Sela Ward, Lawrence O'Donnell	Chris Botti, Paul Buchanan
194	November 30, 2005	Tony Shalhoub, Mitch Albom	N/A

=== December ===
No.	Original release date	Guest(s)	Musical/entertainment guest(s)
195	December 1, 2005	Miranda Lambert, Malachy McCourt	Miranda Lambert
196	December 2, 2005	Tom Arnold, Helen Fielding	Lifehouse
197	December 12, 2005	Jon Cryer, Amy Yasbeck	N/A
198	December 13, 2005	John Waters, David Steinberg	Nada Surf
199	December 14, 2005	Poppy Montgomery, Mancow (Band)	N/A
200	December 15, 2005	Michelle Yeoh, Jeremy Roenick	Trey Anastasio
201	December 16, 2005	Chris Isaak, Sara Gilbert	Keaton Simons
202	December 19, 2005	Dennis Quaid, Bill Nye	Bob Marley
203	December 20, 2005	Dwight Yoakam, Teri Garr	N/A
204	December 21, 2005	Little Richard, Brian Cox	N/A
205	December 22, 2005	Téa Leoni, Amy Tan	RZA
206	December 23, 2005	Katey Sagal, Colin Hanks	Brian McKnight

== 2006 ==
=== January ===
No.	Original release date	Guest(s)	Musical/entertainment guest(s)
207	January 2, 2006	Drew Pinsky, Bob Spitz	N/A
208	January 3, 2006	Fred Willard, Connie Schultz	N/A
209	January 4, 2006	Rob Morrow	Bob Marley
210	January 5, 2006	Don Rickles, Ivana Miličević	Aimee Mann
211	January 6, 2006	Daryl Hannah, Thomas Lennon	N/A
212	January 9, 2006	Cheryl Hines, Derek Luke	Trey Anastasio
213	January 10, 2006	Dr Phil McGraw	Sebastian Maniscalco
214	January 11, 2006	Seth Green, Peter Bart, Peter Guber	N/A
215	January 12, 2006	Tom Selleck, Connie Britton	Ian Edwards
216	January 13, 2006	Steven Wright, Lola Glaudini	Anthony Hamilton
217	January 16, 2006	Allison Janney, John C. McGinley	The 88
218	January 17, 2006	Greg Kinnear, Paula Poundstone	Ming Tsai
219	January 18, 2006	Thomas Cavanagh	N/A
220	January 19, 2006	Vanessa Williams	Rogue Wave
221	January 20, 2006	Mimi Rogers	Living Things
222	January 30, 2006	Drew Pinsky, Amy Yasbeck	Wicked Tinkers
In this more serious episode, Ferguson memorably eulogizes his father, Robert Ferguson.
223	January 31, 2006	Jim Belushi, Parminder Nagra	Matisyahu

=== February ===
No.	Original release date	Guest(s)	Musical/entertainment guest(s)
224	February 1, 2006	James Woods, Piper Perabo	Keaton Simons
225	February 2, 2006	Emma Thompson, Steve Byrne	N/A
226	February 3, 2006	Lynn Redgrave, Isaiah Washington	Mutemath
227	February 6, 2006	Mary Steenburgen	Big & Rich
228	February 7, 2006	Jeff Probst, Lauren Holly	Ne-Yo
229	February 8, 2006	Zooey Deschanel	Trace Adkins
230	February 9, 2006	Jean Reno, Sanaa Lathan	N/A
231	February 10, 2006	Eddie Izzard, Patti Hall	N/A
232	February 13, 2006	Alyson Hannigan, Paul Haggis	Frank Caliendo
233	February 14, 2006	Marlee Matlin	Lisa Loeb
234	February 15, 2006	Paul Reiser, Judy Greer	Jeff Cesario
235	February 16, 2006	Kiefer Sutherland, Amy Adams	Rocco DeLuca and the Burden
236	February 17, 2006	Jason Biggs	Fiona Apple
237	February 20, 2006	William Shatner, Josh Bernstein	Andrea Bocelli
238	February 21, 2006	Carl Reiner, Nadine Velazquez	Robert Hawkins
239	February 22, 2006	Carl Edwards, William H. Macy	N/A
240	February 23, 2006	Samuel L. Jackson, Cokie Roberts	The Lashes
241	February 24, 2006	Dolly Parton, Kevin Smith	The Cult
242	February 27, 2006	Terrence Howard, Eric Haney	N/A
243	February 28, 2006	Regis Philbin, Tichina Arnold	Jenny Lewis & the Watson Twins (Band)

=== March ===
No.	Original release date	Guest(s)	Musical/entertainment guest(s)
244	March 1, 2006	Roseanne Barr, Wolfgang Puck	N/A
245	March 2, 2006	Kathy Bates, Idina Menzel, Jeremy Bloom	N/A
246	March 3, 2006	Milla Jovovich, Peter Travers	All American Rejects
247	March 6, 2006	Paul Haggis, Ben Lee, James Blake	N/A
248	March 7, 2006	Tyra Banks, Jackie Collins, Nathan Sawaya	N/A
249	March 8, 2006	John Larroquette, Ethan Suplee	Fiona Apple
250	March 9, 2006	Wynonna, Emilie de Ravin	D. C. Benny
251	March 10, 2006	David Arquette	Cowboy Troy
252	March 20, 2006	Stockard Channing	Big & Rich
253	March 21, 2006	Rosanne Cash, Howie Mandel	N/A
254	March 22, 2006	Jason Lee, Julian Sands	David Gray
255	March 27, 2006	Joan Cusack, Mary McCormack	The New Cars
256	March 28, 2006	Jane Kaczmarek, Tom Fontana	Dan Naturman
257	March 29, 2006	John Goodman, Angela Nissel	Alkaline Trio
258	March 30, 2006	Frankie Muniz, Annie Duke	N/A
259	March 31, 2006	Chris Kattan, Mo'Nique	Ozomatli

=== April ===
No.	Original release date	Guest(s)	Musical/entertainment guest(s)
260	April 3, 2006	Mehcad Brooks, Anjelica Huston	Ne-Yo
261	April 4, 2006	Rosie O'Donnell, Harry Shearer	N/A
262	April 5, 2006	Paget Brewster, Sam Elliott	Adam Ferrara
263	April 6, 2006	Ben Kingsley, Roselyn Sánchez	UB40
264	April 7, 2006	Kevin Pollak, Mira Sorvino	Train
265	April 10, 2006	Christian Finnegan, Chi McBride, Bebe Neuwirth	N/A
266	April 11, 2006	Carrie Fisher	John Corbett
267	April 12, 2006	Carl Hiaasen, Toby Keith	N/A
268	April 13, 2006	Roger Lay Jr., Ray Romano, Ken Shamrock	N/A
269	April 14, 2006	Melina Kanakaredes, Kyle MacLachlan	Shinedown
270	April 24, 2006	Dennis Quaid	The Wiggles
271	April 25, 2006	Radha Mitchell, Marion Ross	Erin Boheme
272	April 26, 2006	Jennifer Finnigan, Barry Sonnenfeld	N/A
273	April 27, 2006	Dave Barry	Dem Franchize Boyz
274	April 28, 2006	Kristin Chenoweth, Andy García, Mandy Moore	Rock Bottom Remainders
Ferguson returns to his punk rock roots to play the drums with the Rock Bottom Remainders.

=== May ===
No.	Original release date	Guest(s)	Musical/entertainment guest(s)
275	May 1, 2006	Neil Patrick Harris, Parminder Nagra	The BellRays
276	May 2, 2006	Randy Jackson, Connie Schultz	N/A
277	May 3, 2006	Reggie Bush, Jennifer Love Hewitt, Frank McCourt	Secret Machines
278	May 4, 2006	Emily Deschanel, Kelsey Grammer, Aisha Tyler	The Go! Team
279	May 5, 2006	Julia Louis-Dreyfus	Ying-Yang Twins
280	May 8, 2006	Denis Leary	Bo Bice
281	May 9, 2006	Donald Faison, Betty White	Bill Bailey
282	May 10, 2006	Bill Carter, Jenna Fischer	Chris Isaak
283	May 11, 2006	Paul Bettany, Kate Walsh	Damian Marley
284	May 12, 2006	Jacinda Barrett, Mark Harmon	Rock Kills Kid
285	May 15, 2006	Daryl Hannah	Sara Ramirez
286	May 16, 2006	Phil McGraw	Jim Gaffigan
287	May 17, 2006	Merv Griffin, Rick Reilly	N/A
288	May 18, 2006	Diane Farr, Dominic Monaghan	Phil Vassar
289	May 19, 2006	Mía Maestro	Nick Lachey
290	May 22, 2006	Reba McEntire, Cynthia Watros	Toby Keith
291	May 23, 2006	Anna Paquin, Casper Van Dien	Jason Aldean
292	May 24, 2006	Ricki Lake, Oscar De La Hoya	The Wreckers
293	May 25, 2006	Pauley Perrette	Brooks and Dunn
294	May 26, 2006	Jenny McCarthy, Jim Short	Gomez

=== June ===
No.	Original release date	Guest(s)	Musical/entertainment guest(s)
295	June 5, 2006	Jon Favreau, author Lee Child	Shooter Jennings and the .357's perform "Little White Lines" from Electric Rodeo
296	June 6, 2006	Patricia Heaton, Claire Fordham	The New Cars
297	June 7, 2006	Ian McShane, Joey Lauren Adams, Stanley Bing	N/A
298	June 8, 2006	Edie Falco, David Lee Roth	N/A
299	June 9, 2006	Tom Everett Scott	Ludacris, Speech
300	June 12, 2006	Sara Rue, Anthony Michael Hall	Secret Machines
301	June 13, 2006	Anderson Cooper, Mercedes Ruehl	Dan Cummins
302	June 14, 2006	Lorraine Bracco, Kevin Connolly, Jamie Jenson	N/A
303	June 15, 2006	Tony Shalhoub, Lucy Davis	Echo & the Bunnymen
304	June 16, 2006	Jon Cryer, Jim Short	Three Days Grace
305	June 19, 2006	Pepe the King Prawn, Sarah Wynter	The Charlatans
306	June 20, 2006	Katey Sagal, David Milch, Arturo Gatti	N/A
307	June 21, 2006	Stanley Tucci, Cat Deeley	Van Hunt
308	June 22, 2006	Jack Black, James Marsden	Sonya Kitchell
309	June 23, 2006	Tyrese Gibson, Def Leppard, Paul Morrissey	N/A
310	June 26, 2006	Regis Philbin, John Landis	Snoop Dogg
311	June 27, 2006	Henry Winkler, Judy Greer, Michael Young	N/A
312	June 28, 2006	Dave Foley, Amy Sedaris	UB40
313	June 29, 2006	Tim Robbins	T.I.
314	June 30, 2006	Jesse James, Paul Dinello	She Wants Revenge

=== July ===
No.	Original release date	Guest(s)	Musical/entertainment guest(s)
315	July 5, 2006	Laurence Fishburne, Illeana Douglas	Jack's Mannequin
316	July 6, 2006	Tom Lennon	Jewel
317	July 7, 2006	Donal Logue	Ne-Yo
318	July 10, 2006	Toni Collette, Lawrence Block, Joe Theismann	N/A
319	July 11, 2006	Julie Chen, Denise Mina	Echo & the Bunnymen
320	July 12, 2006	Danny Bonaduce, Cote De Pablo, Bill McArthur	N/A
321	July 13, 2006	Joe Mantegna	Brooks & Dunn
322	July 14, 2006	Nick Cannon, Kyle Dunnigan	Family Force 5
323	July 24, 2006	Eddie Izzard, Greg Warren	The Buzzcocks
324	July 25, 2006	Kevin Smith, Carrie Ann Inaba	Seether
325	July 26, 2006	Cuba Gooding Jr., Jay Larson	Jurassic 5
326	July 27, 2006	Greg Kinnear, Hugh Hefner, Sammy Hagar	N/A
327	July 28, 2006	Kyra Sedgwick, Keith Olbermann	N/A
328	July 31, 2006	Andie MacDowell	Cirque du Soleil's KA

=== August ===
No.	Original release date	Guest(s)	Musical/entertainment guest(s)
329	August 1, 2006	Bonnie Raitt, Travis Pastrana	Randy Kagan
330	August 2, 2006	Drew Pinsky, Carnie Wilson	Tally Hall
331	August 3, 2006	Jaime Pressly, Robbie Coltrane	Michael Franti & Spearhead
332	August 4, 2006	Carlos Mencia	Natasha Bedingfield
333	August 7, 2006	Steve Carell	The Subways
334	August 8, 2006	Aaron Eckhart, Cheyenne Kimball, Fran Solomita	N/A
335	August 9, 2006	Tim Olyphant, Lindsay Sloane	The Editors
336	August 10, 2006	Christina Milian, Tim Olyphant, Brian Malow	N/A
337	August 11, 2006	Michael Clarke Duncan, Laura Kightlinger	Rob Zombie
338	August 14, 2006	Chi McBride, Lili Taylor	Nick Lachey
339	August 15, 2006	Matt Dillon, Padma Lakshmi	Paula DeAnda, Baby Bash
340	August 16, 2006	Alice Cooper, Penelope Ann Miller	N/A
341	August 17, 2006	Jane Kaczmarek, Esai Morales, Larke Miller	N/A
342	August 21, 2006	Shannen Doherty, Eddie Kaye Thomas	E-40 T-Pain
343	August 22, 2006	Fred Willard, Rachel Blanchard, Stephen J. Cannell	N/A
344	August 23, 2006	Amy Smart, Trace Adkins	N/A
345	August 24, 2006	Denis Leary, Lewis Dix	Matt Goss
346	August 25, 2006	André Benjamin, David Boreanaz	Mellowdrone

=== September ===
No.	Original release date	Guest(s)	Musical/entertainment guest(s)
347	September 11, 2006	Aaron Brown, Ralph Geidel	Paolo Nutini
348	September 12, 2006	Michael Rapaport, Joely Fisher	N/A
349	September 13, 2006	Virginia Madsen, Jason Ritter	Matt Baetz
350	September 14, 2006	Gary Sinise, Whitley Strieber	Chris Isaak
351	September 15, 2006	Mia Kirshner	Method Man
352	September 18, 2006	Edward Norton, Ethan Suplee	LeToya
353	September 19, 2006	Skeet Ulrich, Nora Ephron	Rodney Atkins
354	September 20, 2006	James Woods, George Eads	Heartland
355	September 21, 2006	Chazz Palminteri, Kerry Washington	French Kiss
356	September 22, 2006	Bradley Whitford, Trudie Styler, Larry Johnson	Sam Roberts
357	September 25, 2006	Lauren Graham, Nick Griffin	Joan Jett
358	September 26, 2006	Marie Osmond, Jacinda Barrett, Mitch Albom	N/A
359	September 27, 2006	Forest Whitaker, Julie Walters, Shang Forbes	N/A
360	September 28, 2006	Billy Connolly, Michael Ian Black	M. Ward
361	September 29, 2006	Billy Bob Thornton, Duane Martin	Starsailor

=== October ===
No.	Original release date	Guest(s)	Musical/entertainment guest(s)
362	October 2, 2006	Jon Favreau, Kristen Bell	Amos Lee
363	October 3, 2006	Tim Daly, David Cross	Diana Krall
364	October 4, 2006	Busta Rhymes, Connie Britton	N/A
365	October 5, 2006	Brooke Shields, Michael Ian Black	Billy Bragg
366	October 6, 2006	Howie Mandel, Andy Summers	Rodrigo y Gabriela
367	October 9, 2006	Emmitt Smith, Kristin Chenoweth	N/A
368	October 10, 2006	Laura Linney, Jordanna Brester	Say Anything
369	October 11, 2006	David Arquette	Monica
370	October 12, 2006	Jennifer Beals, Michael Sheen	Chingy
371	October 13, 2006	Michael Caine	Mario Vasquez
372	October 23, 2006	Maria Bello, Derek Luke	Robin Thicke
373	October 24, 2006	Alan Arkin, Paul Haggis	Jimmy Pardo
374	October 25, 2006	Ron Rifkin, Kevin Nealon	Corinne Bailey Rae
375	October 26, 2006	Brooke Hogan, Eva La Rue, Jason Schwartzman	N/A
376	October 27, 2006	Danny Bonaduce, Gene Pompa	Mew
377	October 30, 2006	Kim Raver, Bob Saget	Deana Carter & Heart
378	October 31, 2006	Carrie Fisher, Todd Oliver	Alice Cooper

=== November ===
No.	Original release date	Guest(s)	Musical/entertainment guest(s)
379	November 1, 2006	Barry Pepper, Amy Sedaris	Carlos Alazraqui
380	November 2, 2006	Tim Robbins, Jamie Lidell	N/A
381	November 3, 2006	Alec Baldwin, Barry Manilow	N/A
382	November 6, 2006	Val Kilmer, Rebecca Gayheart	Paolo Nutini
383	November 8, 2006	Merv Griffin, Marshall Faulk	Carrot Top
384	November 9, 2006	Emma Thompson, Eamonn Walker	Joseph Arthur
385	November 10, 2006	Ashley Judd, Seth MacFarlane	Pet Shop Boys
386	November 13, 2006	Hugh Laurie, Spike Feresten	OK Go
387	November 14, 2006	Steven Weber, Emily Deschanel, Phil Rosenthal	N/A
388	November 15, 2006	Anne Heche, Rain Pryor	Jeff Caldwell
389	November 16, 2006	Maura Tierney, Scott Turow	Lindsay Buckingham
390	November 17, 2006	Ice-T, Henry Cho	N/A
391	November 20, 2006	Christian Slater, Sue Johanson	Driveblind
392	November 21, 2006	Emilio Estevez, Eva Pigford	Jim Short
393	November 22, 2006	Fred Willard, Ashley Scott	Gabriel Iglesias
394	November 23, 2006	Felicity Huffman, Dax Shepard	Akon
395	November 27, 2006	William Shatner, Mike Luckovich	Driveblind
396	November 28, 2006	William H. Macy, Jeri Ryan, Isabel Allende	N/A
397	November 29, 2006	Anthony LaPaglia, Carl Edwards	Sparta
398	November 30, 2006	John Waters, Alex Borstein	Plain White T's

=== December ===
No.	Original release date	Guest(s)	Musical/entertainment guest(s)
399	December 1, 2006	Kevin Smith, Suzy Nakamura	Joseph Arthur
400	December 4, 2006	Betty White, Twiggy	Sam Moore & Travis Tritt
401	December 6, 2006	John Stamos, Sean Maguire	Ziggy Marley
402	December 7, 2006	Chris Kattan, Chiwetel Ejiofor	Ciara
403	December 8, 2006	John Novasad	Tyrese
404	December 11, 2006	Ted Danson, Julia Sweeney	Akon
405	December 12, 2006	Camryn Manheim, Stephen Fry	N/A
406	December 13, 2006	Rob Morrow, Lucy Lawless	Jet
407	December 14, 2006	Pat Croce	Jewel
408	December 15, 2006	Michael Rapaport, Tom Kenny	N/A
409	December 18, 2006	Edward Norton, Jenna Fischer	N/A
410	December 19, 2006	Laura Dern, Ming Tsai, Danny Elfman	N/A
411	December 20, 2006	Paula Poundstone	Xzibit
412	December 21, 2006	Samuel L. Jackson, Avi Liberman	Hinder
413	December 22, 2006	Dominic Monaghan, Anthony Mackie	Twisted Sister

== 2007 ==
=== January ===
No.	Original release date	Guest(s)	Musical/entertainment guest(s)
414	January 2, 2007	James Denton, Dan Gabriel, Julie Gribble	N/A
415	January 3, 2007	Kate Walsh, Clark Gregg, Skyler Stone	N/A
416	January 4, 2007	Carl Reiner, Tracee Ellis Ross, Max Brooks	N/A
417	January 5, 2007	Neil Patrick Harris, Sherri Shepherd	Hellogoodbye
418	January 8, 2007	Mario Lopez, Shawn Colvin	Ne-Yo
419	January 9, 2007	Jonathan Silverman, Antonio Gates	Greg Proops
420	January 10, 2007	LL Cool J, Masi Oka	Chris Daughtry
422	January 11, 2007	Emily Watson, Ed Begley Jr., Cash Levy	N/A
423	January 12, 2007	Emily Blunt, Louis C.K.	Lady Sovereign
424	January 15, 2007	Teutul Sr. & Jr., Kelly Hu, Greg Owen	N/A
425	January 16, 2007	Helen Mirren	Steve Trevino
426	January 17, 2007	Juliette Lewis, Aaron Lewis	Common
427	January 18, 2007	Chevy Chase, Hannah Storm	Montgomery
428	January 19, 2007	Tony Gonzalez	Fantasia
429	January 29, 2007	Dylan McDermott, Connie Nielsen	Billy Bragg
430	January 30, 2007	Julie Bowen, Terry Crews, Michael Meehan	N/A
431	January 31, 2007	Chad Lowe, RZA	N/A

=== February ===
No.	Original release date	Guest(s)	Musical/entertainment guest(s)
432	February 1, 2007	Henry Winkler, Zoe Saldaña	Jet
433	February 2, 2007	Jerry Springer, Robert Dubac	Aaron Lewis
TBA	February 4, 2007	Billy Bob Thornton	Hank Williams Jr. and Lynrd Skynrd performs Gimme Three Steps; Phi Beta Signma Step Team
Super Bowl Special from Colony Theatre in Miami Beach. Ferguson chats strategy with Mike Ditka, tosses the football with Dan Marino, gets tattooed by Ami James at Miami Ink, speaks with Hannah Storm and Cato June from Dolphin Stadium and lunches with Gloria Estefan. IHOP skit with a plethora of "stars" all played by Ferguson. Tim Meadows and Bradley Laise also appear in skits.
434	February 5, 2007	Danny Bonaduce, Tom Lennon	Ben Garant
435	February 6, 2007	Mena Suvari, Lawrence Block	Naked Trucker
436	February 7, 2007	Bob Saget, Kaylee Defer	Jonny Lang
437	February 8, 2007	Thandie Newton	The Game
438	February 9, 2007	Eddie Griffin, Mat Kearney	Steve Mazan
439	February 12, 2007	Peter O'Toole, Joely Fisher	Dierks Bentley & The Grascals
440	February 13, 2007	Aisha Tyler, Harry Shearer, Tyler Williamson	N/A
441	February 14, 2007	David Hasselhoff, Richard Wiese	K.T. Tunstall
442	February 15, 2007	Jennifer Love Hewitt, John Cena	Three Days Grace
443	February 16, 2007	Kiefer Sutherland, Sam Tripoli	Rich Boy
444	February 19, 2007	Virginia Madsen, David Steinberg	Unwritten Law
445	February 20, 2007	Patricia Heaton, Parminder Nagra	N/A
446	February 21, 2007	Danny Bonaduce, Ioan Gruffudd	Gordie Brown
447	February 22, 2007	Mark Ruffalo, Wolfgang Puck	Tom Lennon & Ben Garant
448	February 23, 2007	Jennifer Tilly, Ami James	Rodney Atkins
449	February 26, 2007	Regis Philbin, James McAvoy	Red Jumpsuit Apparatus
450	February 27, 2007	Jill Hennessy, Oliver Hudson, Jim McDonald	N/A
451	February 28, 2007	Billy Connolly, Tricia Helfer	Blake Shelton

=== March ===
No.	Original release date	Guest(s)	Musical/entertainment guest(s)
452	March 1, 2007	Jennifer Tilly, Seth MacFarlane	The Cat Empire
453	March 2, 2007	John Mellencamp, Oscar De La Hoya	N/A
454	March 5, 2007	Jennifer Hudson, Gerard Butler	Anberlin
455	March 6, 2007	Poppy Montgomery, Jeremy Roenick, Paul Morrissey	N/A
456	March 7, 2007	Andy Garcia, Rob Corddry	N/A
457	March 8, 2007	Bill Maher, Jacinda Barrett	Razorlight
458	March 9, 2007	Kerry Washington, Jeff Applebaum	Aaron Lewis
459	March 19, 2007	Merv Griffin, Nia Long	John Mellencamp
460	March 20, 2007	Cuba Gooding Jr., Joely Richardson	Andy Vastola
461	March 21, 2007	Tom Arnold, Drake Witham	Hinder
462	March 26, 2007	Joss Stone, Rainn Wilson	Joss Stone
463	March 27, 2007	Randy Jackson, Piper Perabo	Roy Wood Jr.
464	March 28, 2007	Sigourney Weaver, Kal Penn	The Ataris
465	March 29, 2007	Jeff Goldblum	Papa Roach
466	March 30, 2007	Chandra Wilson, Bobby Miyamoto	Bone Thugs N' Harmony

=== April ===
No.	Original release date	Guest(s)	Musical/entertainment guest(s)
467	April 2, 2007	Josh Brolin, Jason Segel, Matt Knudsen	N/A
468	April 3, 2007	Rose McGowan, Wolfgang Puck	N/A
469	April 4, 2007	Robert Rodriguez, John C. McGinley	N/A
470	April 5, 2007	Sydney Tamiia Poitier, Ice Cube	Omarion
471	April 6, 2007	Carla Gugino, Randy Couture	Redman
472	April 9, 2007	Kurt Russell, Barry Sonnenfeld	Paul Wall
473	April 10, 2007	Quentin Tarantino, Laura Prepon	N/A
474	April 11, 2007	Jeff Probst, Amy Yasbeck	Greg Warren
475	April 12, 2007	David Duchovny, Nia Long	K-os
476	April 13, 2007	Julia Louis-Dreyfus, Rodney Carrington	Cold War Kids
477	April 23, 2007	Mary Hart, Brady Quinn	The Exies
478	April 24, 2007	Paula Abdul, Vinnie Jones	Billy D. Washington
479	April 25, 2007	Jerry Springer, Mario	Simply Red
480	April 26, 2007	Jenny McCarthy, Frank McCourt	Mo Mandel
481	April 27, 2007	Jon Cryer, Boyd Matson	Good Charlotte
482	April 30, 2007	Frank Caliendo, Samantha Mathis	The Noisettes

=== May ===
No.	Original release date	Guest(s)	Musical/entertainment guest(s)
483	May 1, 2007	Tim Daly, Charlie Viracola	Joe
484	May 2, 2007	Eric Bana, Julia Sweeney	Fountains of Wayne
485	May 3, 2007	Alice Cooper, Michael Rosenbaum	Gary Gulman
486	May 4, 2007	Molly Shannon, Duane Martin	Ozomatli
487	May 7, 2007	Sophia Bush	Ne-Yo
488	May 8, 2007	Floyd Mayweather, Julianne Nicholson	Lynne Koplitz
489	May 9, 2007	Steven Wright, Carrie Ann Inaba	Dinosaur Jr.
490	May 10, 2007	Garry Shandling, Nathan Fillion	Craig Morgan
491	May 11, 2007	Larry the Cable Guy, Maureen McCormick	Montgomery Gentry
492	May 14, 2007	Carrot Top, Miranda Lambert	N/A
493	May 15, 2007	Roseanne Barr, Malachy McCourt	N/A
494	May 16, 2007	Bob Barker, Elizabeth Banks	Modest Mouse
495	May 17, 2007	Phil McGraw	Tori Amos
496	May 18, 2007	Gina Gershon, Dan Naturman	The Exies
497	May 21, 2007	Lance Burton, Matt Serra	Chantal Kreviazuk
498	May 22, 2007	Carrie Fisher, Naomie Harris, Nathan Gibson	N/A
499	May 23, 2007	Jason Randal, Cat Deeley	Albert Hammond, Jr.
500	May 24, 2007	Chi McBride, Rick Thomas	Patti Smith
501	May 25, 2007	Bob Saget, Guy Torry	Jade

=== June ===
No.	Original release date	Guest(s)	Musical/entertainment guest(s)
502	June 4, 2007	Dennis Hopper, Eddie Pence	Darryl Worley
503	June 5, 2007	Rosie Perez, David Milch	Patti Smith
504	June 6, 2007	Carl Reiner, Jonah Hill	Bright Eyes
505	June 7, 2007	Don Cheadle, Bret Michaels	Poison
506	June 8, 2007	Jon Heder, Criss Angel	N/A
507	June 11, 2007	Don Rickles, Ali Wentworth	Marty Stuart
508	June 12, 2007	Parker Posey, Ian Hunter	N/A
509	June 13, 2007	Eric Idle, S., Epatha Merkerson	Guy Torry
510	June 14, 2007	Jeff Bridges, Carrie-Anne Moss	Mute Math
511	June 15, 2007	Seth Green, Bob Barker	Henry Cho
512	June 18, 2007	Avril Lavigne, Ioan Gruffudd	Avril Lavigne
513	June 19, 2007	Drew Pinsky	Enrique Iglesias
514	June 20, 2007	Mo'Nique	Big and Rich
515	June 21, 2007	Ben Kingsley, Mary McCormack	Jesse Malin
516	June 22, 2007	Eddie Izzard, John Roy	The Goo Goo Dolls
517	June 25, 2007	Wanda Sykes, Tim Spall	Bobby Valentino
518	June 26, 2007	Janeane Garofalo, Tina Brown	Bob Marley
519	June 27, 2007	Mandy Moore, David Steinberg	N/A
520	June 28, 2007	Wayne Brady, Mary Elizabeth Winstead	Ben Kweller
521	June 29, 2007	Chris Isaak, Cory Kahaney	N/A

=== July ===
No.	Original release date	Guest(s)	Musical/entertainment guest(s)
522	July 2, 2007	Dr. Kevin Fitzgerald	Sinéad O'Connor
523	July 3, 2007	Kristen Bell, Wolfgang Puck	Big and Rich
524	July 5, 2007	Brenda Blethyn, Mike Rowe	Army of Me
525	July 6, 2007	Amy Sedaris, Jackie Collins	Breaking Benjamin
526	July 9, 2007	Kathy Griffin, Ken Bruen	Marty Stuart
527	July 10, 2007	Cedric the Entertainer, Kara Cooney	Jeff Keith
528	July 11, 2007	Julie Chen, James Marsden	Sara Bareilles
529	July 12, 2007	Ted Danson, Maggie Q	Silverchair
530	July 13, 2007	Rupert Grint	Dr. Dog
531	July 23, 2007	Glenn Close, Jeffrey Ross	Lily Allen
532	July 24, 2007	Julia Stiles, Carl Bernstein	N/A
533	July 25, 2007	Jason Priestley, Sherri Shepherd	Chris Reid
534	July 26, 2007	Aaron Eckhart	Hanson
535	July 27, 2007	James Denton, Amber Stevens	The Cribs
536	July 30, 2007	Drew Carey, Megalyn Echikunwoke	N/A
537	July 31, 2007	Jon Voight, Alicia Coppola	Will Marfori

=== August ===
No.	Original release date	Guest(s)	Musical/entertainment guest(s)
538	August 1, 2007	Miss Piggy, Jonathan Silverman	Glen Hansard, Markéta Irglová
539	August 2, 2007	Julie Delpy, Alfred Molina	N/A
540	August 3, 2007	Pamela Anderson, Nellie McKay	Hans Klok, Avi Liberman
541	August 6, 2007	Kyra Sedgwick, Paula Poundstone	Emerson Drive
542	August 7, 2007	Ben Stein, Megyn Price	Rodney Laney
543	August 8, 2007	Michelle Pfeiffer, Rachel Nichols	Kat DeLuna
544	August 10, 2007	Cuba Gooding Jr., Cash Levy	Grace Potter & the Nocturnals
545	August 13, 2007	Tori Spelling	Brother Ali
546	August 14, 2007	Jonah Hill, Natascha McElhone	N/A
547	August 15, 2007	Aishwarya Rai, Dom Irrera	Lifehouse
548	August 16, 2007	Masi Oka	Emily Fox, Emerson Hart
549	August 17, 2007	Aisha Tyler, Dwayne Perkins	Augie March
550	August 20, 2007	Tony Danza, Rose Byrne	N/A
551	August 21, 2007	Nick Cannon, Alan Bean	Jeremy Fisher
552	August 22, 2007	Tom Lennon, Elizabeth Perkins	Wendy Kamenoff
553	August 23, 2007	Samuel L. Jackson	The Cliks
554	August 24, 2007	Holly Hunter, Adam Goldberg	Ferraby Lionheart

=== September ===
No.	Original release date	Guest(s)	Musical/entertainment guest(s)
554	September 10, 2007	Frank Caliendo, Sherman Alexie	Clay Walker
555	September 11, 2007	Gavin de Becker, Dwight Yoakam	N/A
556	September 12, 2007	Julie Chen, Dario Franchitti	Matt Baetz
557	September 13, 2007	Jason Alexander, Barbara Morgan, Scott Kelly	Wendy Kamenoff
558	September 14, 2007	Eric Idle, Les Stroud	Finger Eleven
559	September 17, 2007	Alan Alda, Alex O'Loughlin	N/A
560	September 18, 2007	Jeff Goldblum, Paul Haggis, Mandy Moore	N/A
561	September 19, 2007	Phil McGraw, Kaley Cuoco	Bob Dubac
562	September 20, 2007	James Woods, Ben Lee	N/A
563	September 21, 2007	Terrence Howard, Jennifer Westfeldt	Zap Mama
564	September 24, 2007	50 Cent, Emily Deschanel	N/A
565	September 25, 2007	D.L. Hughley, Kaitlin Olson, Hannibal Buress	N/A
566	September 26, 2007	Marg Helgenberger, Seth MacFarlane	The National
567	September 27, 2007	Jennifer Love Hewitt, Oliver Hudson	Cary Brothers
568	September 28, 2007	Greg Kinnear, Paul Morrissey	Raul Midon

=== October ===
No.	Original release date	Guest(s)	Musical/entertainment guest(s)
569	October 1, 2007	Juliette Lewis, David Boreanaz	N/A
570	October 2, 2007	Chi McBride, Teri Polo	Steve Bertrand
571	October 3, 2007	Kevin Smith, Tasha Smith	J-L Cauvin
572	October 4, 2007	Anjelica Huston, Pat Monahan	Cathy Ladman
573	October 5, 2007	Josh Duhamel, Radha Mitchell	Diana Krall
574	October 8, 2007	Jimmy Smits, Michelle Monaghan	Shout Out Louds
575	October 9, 2007	Tim Daly, Nia Long	Ron Pearson
576	October 10, 2007	Fred Willard, Saffron Burrows	Modest Mouse
577	October 11, 2007	Tom Arnold, Tori Amos	N/A
577	October 12, 2007	Lt. Col Kevin Robbins	N/A
578	October 15, 2007	Michael Caine	Lizzy Cooperman
579	October 16, 2007	Vicente Fox, Leslie Bibb	Ron Pearson
580	October 17, 2007	Ian McKellen, Jena Malone	Avril Lavigne
581	October 18, 2007	John Larroquette	They Might Be Giants
582	October 19, 2007	Kenneth Branagh, Todd Sawyer	N/A
583	October 29, 2007	Kristin Chenoweth, Clive Barker	James Jonah
584	October 30, 2007	Steve Carell	Good Charlotte
585	October 31, 2007	John Lydon, Steve Jones, Joe Theisman	The Sex Pistols

=== November ===
No.	Original release date	Guest(s)	Musical/entertainment guest(s)
586	November 1, 2007	Anthony Hopkins, Yvonne Strahovski	N/A
587	November 2, 2007	Seth Green, Dwight Yoakam	N/A

There were no other episodes produced in November as well as all of December due to the 2007–08 Writers Guild of America strike.

== 2008 ==
=== January ===
No.	Original release date	Guest(s)	Musical/entertainment guest(s)
589	January 2, 2008	None	N/A
No guests. Although the Writers Guild of America was on strike, David Letterman's Worldwide Pants, Inc., which produced The Late Late Show and owned its timeslot, negotiated with the WGA and met their demands.
590	January 3, 2008	Dominic Monaghan, Jason Randal; ESPN UK skit with Dominic Monaghan, show writer Philip McGrade and Ferguson	N/A
591	January 4, 2008	Leonard Nimoy	Lyle Lovett performs "I Will Rise Up"
592	January 7, 2008	RZA, Greg Proops	Comedian Greg Proops
593	January 8, 2008	Marion Cotillard, Kevin Fitzgerald	Rogue Wave performs "Lake Michigan" from Asleep at Heaven's Gate
594	January 9, 2008	Emile Hirsch, Wolfgang Puck	N/A
595	January 10, 2008	Val Kilmer, Michael Gates Gill; The Bold and the Beautiful's Dan McVicar drops in	Ian Hunter, originally of Mott the Hoople, performs 1973's "All the Way from Memphis" from Mott
596	January 11, 2008	Alec Baldwin, Lena Headey	Spoon performs "You Got Yr. Cherry Bomb" from Ga Ga Ga Ga Ga
During Baldwin's interview, Ferguson notes the contrived nature of his show notecard and tears it up. Tearing up notecards becomes a permanent hallmark of interviews, reflecting his intent to have an authentic conversation with guests. Ferguson also takes the opportunity to dunk on the Golden Globes, and introduce "Spider Thingy Bong Night."
597	January 14, 2008	Ben Kingsley, Laura Prepon	Lupe Fiasco performs "Superstar" from The Cool
598	January 15, 2008	Drew Carey, Seth Gabel	Kate Nash
599	January 16, 2008	James McAvoy, Jon Cryer	Blake Lewis
600	January 17, 2008	Trace Adkins, Julie Benz	N/A
601	January 18, 2008	Ted Danson, Ali Wentworth	N/A
602	January 21, 2008	Sylvester Stallone, Steve Wiebe	N/A
603	January 22, 2008	Tony Shalhoub, Becki Newton	Dean Edwards
604	January 23, 2008	Carmen Electra, Justin Bartha	Comedienne Margaret Cho
605	January 24, 2008	Ringo Starr	Ringo Starr & His All Starr Band
606	January 25, 2008	Diane Lane; U2 skit with Ferguson as Bono, show writer Philip McGrade as the Edge, and show writer John T. Reynolds as Ferguson	Comedian James Johann; Ayọ performs "Down on My Knees" from Joyful
607	January 28, 2008	Denis Leary	Deana Carter
608	January 29, 2008	Raquel Welch	Lyle Lovett
609	January 30, 2008	Antonio Gates, Adam Arkin	Ryan Sickler
610	January 31, 2008	Julia Louis-Dreyfus, Lindsay Sloane	N/A

=== February ===
No.	Original release date	Guest(s)	Musical/entertainment guest(s)
611	February 1, 2008	Eva Longoria Parker, Allen Covert	Al Madrigal
612	February 4, 2008	Kristen Bell	Wicked Tinkers
Video of Ferguson being sworn in as an American citizen. Monologue includes a description of his first solo flight, and announcement of his being chosen to host the 2008 White House Correspondents' Dinner.
613	February 5, 2008	Amy Ryan, Terry Crews	Sebastian Maniscalco
614	February 6, 2008	Bradley Whitford, Lake Bell, Cynthia Littleton	N/A
615	February 7, 2008	Jon Favreau, Alicia Coppola	Shelby Lynne
616	February 8, 2008	Jessica Alba, Dierks Bentley	Mo'Nique
617	February 11, 2008	Julie Chen, Natasha Bedingfield	N/A
618	February 12, 2008	Susan Sarandon, Bonnie Somerville	N/A
619	February 13, 2008	Michael Clarke Duncan, Jan Davidson	North Mississippi Allstars
620	February 14, 2008	Evangeline Lilly, Adam Goldberg	Bebel Gilberto
621	February 15, 2008	Jeffrey Tambor, Ivana Miličević, Bobby Miyamoto	N/A
622	February 18, 2008	Alice Cooper, Angela Kinsey	Wyclef Jean
623	February 19, 2008	Andre Benjamin, Craig Bierko	Melinda Hill
624	February 20, 2008	Tom Selleck, Dario Franchitti	Ziggy Marley
625	February 21, 2008	Don Rickles, Joe Mantegna	N/A
626	February 22, 2008	Fred Willard, Rachel Bilson	N/A
627	February 25, 2008	Jennifer Beals, Carrie Ann Inaba	Little Big Town
628	February 26, 2008	Regis Philbin	Alice Smith
629	February 27, 2008	Eric Bana, Patricia Clarkson	Barry Manilow
630	February 28, 2008	Natasha Henstridge, Carl Bernstein	Steve Mazan
631	February 29, 2008	Dweezil Zappa, Jason Randal; Josh Robert Thompson appears as Arnold Schwarzenegger	Coolio

=== March ===
No.	Original release date	Guest(s)	Musical/entertainment guest(s)
632	March 3, 2008	Brooke Shields, Ming Tsai	Michelle Biloon
633	March 4, 2008	Christina Ricci, Dee Dee Myers	Collective Soul
634	March 5, 2008	Dennis Hopper, Yunjin Kim	Nicole Atkins
635	March 6, 2008	Wanda Sykes, Saffron Burrows	Grizzly Bear
636	March 7, 2008	Amy Sedaris, Shanna Moakler	Blake Shelton
637	March 17, 2008	Ray Romano, Kate Flannery	Jeff Caldwell
U2 skit with Ferguson as Bono and Philip McGrade as The Edge
638	March 18, 2008	Kate Beckinsale, Ken Tucker	N/A
639	March 19, 2008	Parker Posey	Graham Colton performs "Best Days"
640	March 24, 2008	Laurence Fishburne, Rashida Jones	Joe Devito
641	March 25, 2008	Thandie Newton, Dom Irrera	Comedian Dom Irrera
Invisible sidekick Davis assists Ferguson with the monologue
642	March 26, 2008	Pamela Anderson, Christian Siriano	N/A
Skit: "The Rather Late Programme with Prince Charles"
643	March 31, 2008	Aisha Tyler, Richard Branson	N/A
Larry King skit with Ferguson as Larry King and show writer John T. Reynolds as Ferguson; First "What Did We Learn On The Show Tonight Craig?"

=== April ===
No.	Original release date	Guest(s)	Musical/entertainment guest(s)
644	April 1, 2008	Forest Whitaker, Jean-Michel Cousteau	Your Lips Your Lips
645	April 2, 2008	Marg Helgenberger, Kylie Minogue	Kylie Minogue
646	April 3, 2008	Jennifer Love Hewitt, Jonny Lee Miller	N/A
647	April 4, 2008	Jena Malone	Mrs. Hughes
648	April 7, 2008	Bob Saget, Jennifer Esposito	N/A
649	April 8, 2008	Anne Heche, Deion Sanders	Comedian Clinton Jackson
650	April 9, 2008	Roseanne Barr, Kaley Cuoco	Counting Crows perform "You Can't Count on Me" from Saturday Nights and Sunday Mornings
U2 skit with Ferguson as Bono, show writer Philip McGrade as the Edge, and show writer John T. Reynolds as Brad Pitt
651	April 10, 2008	Alyson Hannigan, Todd Allen	Del the Funky Homosapien
652	April 11, 2008	Christina Applegate, Brittany Snow	Gene Pompa
653	April 14, 2008	John Waters, Daniel Lanois	N/A
654	April 15, 2008	Julie Andrews, David Krumholtz	N/A
655	April 16, 2008	Lynn Ferguson, Jackie Chan	Bell X1
656	April 17, 2008	Henry Winkler, Cobie Smulders	Liam Finn performs "Second Chance" from I'll Be Lightning
Playboy Mansion skit: "Bunny" Ferguson is tries to get in to the party Skit: "The Rather Late Program with Prince Charles" with warm-up comedian Chunky B as the guard
657	April 18, 2008	Kristen Bell, Oliver Hudson	N/A
658	April 24, 2008	Ben Stein, Alicia Witt	Andrew Norelli
659	April 25, 2008	Jason Segel, Connie Schultz	N/A
660	April 28, 2008	Ewan McGregor	Morissey performs "All You Need is Me"
Ferguson recounts events at his White House Correspondents' Dinner gig Ewan McGregor joins Ferguson and Philip McGrade for a thoroughly unrehearsed "ESPN UK/Field of Weems" skit.
661	April 29, 2008	Kathy Griffin, Scott Kennedy	Morrissey
662	April 30, 2008	Jeff Bridges, Sophia Myles	Grand Archives

=== May ===
No.	Original release date	Guest(s)	Musical/entertainment guest(s)
663	May 1, 2008	Helen Hunt, Sarah Chalke	She & Him
664	May 2, 2008	Lake Bell, Kal Penn	N/A
665	May 5, 2008	Hugh Laurie, Michael Starr	N/A
666	May 6, 2008	John Goodman, Jason Aldean	N/A
667	May 7, 2008	Felicity Huffman, Mike Doughty	N/A
668	May 8, 2008	Emily Deschanel, Melvin Lardy	N/A
669	May 9, 2008	Rachel Griffiths, Christopher Gorham	N/A
670	May 12, 2008	John Stamos, Judith Smith-Levin	Jaymay
671	May 13, 2008	John Cusack, Parminder Nagra	N/A
672	May 14, 2008	Tony Danza, Maura Tierney	N/A
673	May 15, 2008	David Boreanaz	Carrot Top
674	May 16, 2008	Reba McEntire, Vinnie Jones	N/A
675	May 19, 2008	Valerie Bertinelli, Paulina Porizkova	Estelle
676	May 20, 2008	Clay Aiken, Chelsea Handler	N/A
677	May 21, 2008	Laura Dern	k.d. lang
678	May 22, 2008	Steven Wright, Tricia Helfer	N/A

=== June ===
No.	Original release date	Guest(s)	Musical/entertainment guest(s)
679	June 2, 2008	Julia Louis-Dreyfus	Matt Costa
680	June 3, 2008	Kristin Davis, Joel McHale	Shooter Jennings
681	June 4, 2008	Jane Kaczmarek, Greg Proops	N/A
682	June 5, 2008	Jeff Foxworthy, Chelsea Handler	N/A
683	June 6, 2008	Poppy Montgomery, Drake Witham	N/A
The Late Late Show skit with show writer John T. Reynolds as Ferguson, and Ferguson as Sean Connery.
684	June 9, 2008	Evan Handler, Betty White	MGMT
685	June 10, 2008	Rachel Dratch, Carl Reiner	Augustana
686	June 11, 2008	Stockard Channing, Bill Engvall	N/A
687	June 12, 2008	Jenna Fischer, Wolfgang Puck	N/A
Skit with Ferguson as Queen Elizabeth and James Adomian as George W. Bush
688	June 13, 2008	Elizabeth Perkins	Coolio
Betty White drops in for a comedy bit "Murder She Wrote" skit with show writers John T. Reynolds and Philip McGrade
689	June 16, 2008	Alfred Molina, Salman Rushdie	N/A
Jamie Denbo does a skit as Hillary Clinton
690	June 17, 2008	Virginia Madsen, Darin Strauss	John Hiatt
691	June 18, 2008	Don Cheadle, Olivia Thirlby	N/A
692	June 19, 2008	Lewis Black, Billy Bob Thornton	The Boxmasters
693	June 20, 2008	Jeffrey Tambor	The Fratellis
"The J.K. Rowling Show" skit with writer Philip McGrade
694	June 23, 2008	David Hasselhoff, Miriam Shor	Amos Lee
695	June 24, 2008	Lawrence Block, Chris O'Donnell	Phantom Planet
696	June 25, 2008	Stanley Bing, Sigourney Weaver	Three 6 Mafia
697	June 26, 2008	James McAvoy, Bengt Washburn	N/A
Murder She Wrote sketch with Alfred Molina and show writer John T. Reynolds.
698	June 27, 2008	Holly Hunter	N/A
Henry Winkler drops in for a comedy bit.
699	June 30, 2008	Tricia Helfer, Steven Wright	N/A

=== July ===
No.	Original release date	Guest(s)	Musical/entertainment guest(s)
700	July 1, 2008	Tyler Matthew Davis, Richard Lewis	Duffy
701	July 14, 2008	Chris Isaak, Debbie Reynolds	N/A
702	July 15, 2008	Julie Andrews, Raymond Crowe	N/A
703	July 16, 2008	Ben Kingsley	Popovich Comedy Pet Theater
704	July 17, 2008	Ron Perlman, Rita Rudner	N/A
705	July 18, 2008	Criss Angel, Mary Steenburgen	N/A
Bit with show writer John T. Reynolds as Ferguson, and Ferguson as Michael Caine
706	July 21, 2008	Jarod Miller, Aisha Tyler	Keaton Simons
707	July 22, 2008	Julie Chen, Adam Scott	Ricky Skaggs
708	July 23, 2008	Wayne Newton, Les Stroud	Curt Smith
709	July 24, 2008	Lance Morrow, Amanda Peet	N/A
710	July 25, 2008	Xzibit	Griffin House
711	July 28, 2008	Eric Idle, Nancy Travis	N/A
712	July 29, 2008	Belinda Carlisle, Jet Li	Belinda Carlisle
713	July 30, 2008	Julie Chen, Tom Sullivan, Michelle Yeoh	LS3
714	July 31, 2008	Jean-Michel Cousteau, Will Ferrell	N/A

=== August ===
No.	Original release date	Guest(s)	Musical/entertainment guest(s)
715	August 1, 2008	Rainn Wilson, Cory Kahaney	The Hold Steady perform "Construct the Summer" from Stay Positive
Skit with Ferguson as himself and Tom Lennon as a CBS executive
716	August 4, 2008	Cheryl Hines, Harry Shearer	Jakob Dylan
717	August 5, 2008	Regis Philbin, Paula Patton	N/A
718	August 6, 2008	Eddie Izzard, Julie Chen	N/A
719	August 7, 2008	Jack Black, Tom Arnold (actor)	Conor Oberst
720	August 8, 2008	Toby Keith	Toby Keith
721	August 11, 2008	Robert Downey Jr., Amy Smart	N/A
722	August 12, 2008	Kate Mara, Kiefer Sutherland	N/A
723	August 13, 2008	Julie Chen, Hugh Moore	music from Henry Poole Is Here
724	August 14, 2008	Ben Kingsley, Idina Menzel	Idina Menzel
725	August 15, 2008	Radha Mitchell	Comedian Aaron Karo
Cold open: Late Late Show version of the opening scene from Apocalypse Now; Skit with Ferguson as Simon Cowell and show writer John T. Reynolds as the bartender

=== September ===
No.	Original release date	Guest(s)	Musical/entertainment guest(s)
726	September 1, 2008	Julie Bowen, Jonathan Winters	Priscilla Ahn plays "Leave the Light On"
727	September 2, 2008	Katey Sagal, Nathan Fillion	N/A
728	September 3, 2008	Julie Chen, Maria Bello	Shelby Lynne plays "How Can I Be Sure"
Skit with James Adomian as George W. Bush
729	September 4, 2008	Eva Longoria, Neal McDonough	N/A
730	September 5, 2008	Kal Penn	Gabe Dixon Band plays "Till You're Gone"
731	September 8, 2008	Julie Chen, Neil Patrick Harris, Sophia Myles	N/A
732	September 9, 2008	Russell Brand	N/A
John T. Reynolds does a comedic bit impersonating Ferguson in the cold open.
733	September 10, 2008	Alice Cooper, AnnaLynne McCord	Alice Cooper performs "Elected" from Billion Dollar Babies
Monologue on the media's coverage of politics and the importance of voting
734	September 11, 2008	Lynn Ferguson, Lance Morrow	N/A
Cold open: short, serious discussion of Ferguson's views on this anniversary of the September 11, 2001 terrorist attacks
735	September 12, 2008	Lena Headey	N/A
When Seann William Scott, a scheduled guest, is stuck in traffic, Ferguson improvises with an interview of segment producer Lisa Ammerman, who had been in charge of coordinating Scott's appearance
736	September 15, 2008	Julie Chen, Jason Biggs	The Ting Tings
737	September 16, 2008	Paulina Porizkova, Ken Tucker	Tally Hall
738	September 17, 2008	Alan Alda, Illeana Douglas	N/A
739	September 18, 2008	Jason Segel	Dr Dog; Comedian Steve Hofstetter
First puppet-style cold open featuring a stuffed monkey, who also handles the "What Did We Learn on the Show Tonight, Craig?" closing segment
740	September 19, 2008	Kristen Bell, Josh Radnor	N/A
741	September 22, 2008	Denis Leary, Marianne Jean-Baptiste	N/A
742	September 23, 2008	John Krasinski, Lisa Masterson	N/A
743	September 24, 2008	Michael Clarke Duncan, Shirley Manson	Jamie Lidell
744	September 25, 2008	Tim Gunn, Elizabeth Reaser	N/A
745	September 26, 2008	Drew Carey, Tony Parker	Lady Antebellum
746	September 29, 2008	Melina Kanakaredes, Gina Carano	Amy Macdonald
747	September 30, 2008	Tim Daly, Anna Friel	Alice Cooper

=== October ===
No.	Original release date	Guest(s)	Musical/entertainment guest(s)
748	October 1, 2008	Jennifer Love Hewitt, Jim Parsons	N/A
749	October 2, 2008	Lauren Graham, Patrick Pedraja	Michael Franti & Spearhead
750	October 3, 2008	Margaret Cho, Randy Newman	Randy Newman
751	October 6, 2008	Seth Green, Betty White	Smothers Brothers
752	October 7, 2008	Thandie Newton, Barry Sonnenfeld	Jim Bianco
753	October 8, 2008	Rufus Sewell	Natasha Bedingfield
754	October 9, 2008	Russell Crowe, Jennifer Esposito	No Age
755	October 10, 2008	Little Britain (Matt Lucas & David Walliams)	Tom Morello
756	October 20, 2008	Dee Dee Myers, Noah Emmerich	N/A
757	October 21, 2008	Rachael Ray, Leanne Marshall	Laura Marling
758	October 22, 2008	Chris Matthews, Christopher Mintz-Plasse	N/A
759	October 23, 2008	John Malkovich	Little Jackie
760	October 24, 2008	Mo'Nique	Bill Santiago, Lenka
761	October 27, 2008	Kathy Griffin, Carl Bernstein	N/A
762	October 28, 2008	Pepe the King Prawn, Saffron Burrows	X
763	October 29, 2008	Ben Stein, Parminder Nagra	New York Dolls
764	October 30, 2008	Kevin Smith, Kaitlin Olson	The Damned
765	October 31, 2008	Lauren Graham	The Damned

=== November ===
No.	Original release date	Guest(s)	Musical/entertainment guest(s)
766	November 3, 2008	Bill Maher	N/A
767	November 5, 2008	Paris Hilton, Drew Pinsky	N/A
768	November 6, 2008	Elizabeth Banks, Jay Mohr	N/A
769	November 7, 2008	Christian Slater, Luke Dempsey	Eric Hutchinson
770	November 10, 2008	Mark Harmon, Ron White	N/A
771	November 11, 2008	Coolio, Tom Dreesen and Tim Reid	Coolio
772	November 12, 2008	Seann William Scott	Kathy Kinney
773	November 13, 2008	Andy Richter	Cold War Kids
774	November 14, 2008	Jim Parsons	Ray Davies
775	November 17, 2008	Poppy Montgomery, Nick Hornby	N/A
776	November 18, 2008	Kevin Bacon, Sarah Shahi	The Bacon Brothers
777	November 19, 2008	James Lipton, Sara Gilbert	Sarah McLachlan
778	November 20, 2008	Larry the Cable Guy	Third Day
779	November 21, 2008	George Hamilton, Cobie Smulders	N/A
780	November 24, 2008	Eamonn Walker	Low vs Diamond
781	November 25, 2008	Neil Patrick Harris	Julia Fordham
First hand-puppet appearance in a cold open (horse).
782	November 26, 2008	Adam Arkin, Jen Kirkman	Adele
783	November 27, 2008	Tony Curtis, Megalyn Echikunwoke	Oppenheimer
784	November 28, 2008	Kristin Chenoweth, Diedrich Bader	N/A

=== December ===
No.	Original release date	Guest(s)	Musical/entertainment guest(s)
785	December 8, 2008	Chi McBride	Seal
Ferguson eulogizes his mother, Janet Ferguson.
786	December 9, 2008	Elizabeth Banks, Ken Tucker	N/A
787	December 10, 2008	Alfred Molina	Tokyo Police Club
788	December 11, 2008	Brooke Shields, Dom Irrera	N/A
789	December 12, 2008	Carrie Fisher, Julie Benz	N/A
790	December 15, 2008	Carmen Electra, Dennis Lehane	N/A
791	December 16, 2008	Don Rickles, Joanna Garcia	N/A
792	December 17, 2008	Samuel L. Jackson	Death Cab for Cutie
793	December 18, 2008	Julia Ormond, Michael Connelly	N/A
794	December 19, 2008	Jeffrey Tambor, Patrick Keane	N/A
795	December 22, 2008	Joel McHale	Matt Nathanson
796	December 23, 2008	Billy Bob Thornton	Conor Oberst
797	December 26, 2008	Kristen Bell, Wolfgang Puck	N/A

== 2009 ==
=== January ===
No.	Original release date	Guest(s)	Musical/entertainment guest(s)
798	January 5, 2009	Richard Lewis	N/A
799	January 6, 2009	Marisa Tomei, Pauley Perrette	N/A
800	January 7, 2009	William Shatner	Jazmine Sullivan
801	January 8, 2009	Amy Sedaris, Dennis Haysbert	N/A
802	January 9, 2009	Ted Danson, Paula Poundstone	N/A
803	January 12, 2009	John Corbett, Tracie Thoms	John Corbett
804	January 13, 2009	Kristin Scott Thomas, Joshua Jackson	N/A
805	January 14, 2009	John Waters, Norah O'Donnell	N/A
806	January 15, 2009	Wanda Sykes	Glasvegas
Ferguson talks about Sully Sullenberger's emergency landing of US Airways Flight 1549 on the Hudson in New York, and tells about his own first solo flight.
807	January 16, 2009	Dev Patel	Greg Proops
808	January 19, 2009	Sarah Chalke, Jeffrey Dean Morgan	Seal
809	January 20, 2009	Joel McHale	The Submarines
810	January 21, 2009	Trace Adkins, Perez Hilton	Trace Adkins
811	January 22, 2009	Jennifer Love Hewitt, Matthew Rhys	N/A
812	January 23, 2009	James Earl Jones	N/A
813	January 26, 2009	Chris Matthews	Comedian Paul C. Morrissey
First musical cold open: Ferguson lip syncs to "She Taught Me How to Yodel" sung by Frank Ifield
814	January 27, 2009	RZA, Jared Harris	RZA
815	January 28, 2009	Cuba Gooding Jr., Freida Pinto	N/A
Musical cold open: puppets lip sync to "Raindrops Keep Fallin' On My Head"
816	January 29, 2009	Dominic Monaghan, Rosemarie DeWitt	N/A
Musical cold open; puppets lip sync to "The Lonely Goatherd" as performed by Julie Andrews and company from The Sound of Music
817	January 30, 2009	Michael Sheen, Russell Peters	Sharon Jones & the Dap-Kings
Musical cold open: puppets lip sync to "Fire" as performed by Arthur Brown

=== February ===
No.	Original release date	Guest(s)	Musical/entertainment guest(s)
818	February 2, 2009	Alfred Molina	Magician Lance Burton
First night of Magic Week, with nightly introductions by Neil Patrick Harris
819	February 3, 2009	Robin Williams	Magician Jason Randall
820	February 4, 2009	Samuel L. Jackson	Magician Jason Hudy
821	February 5, 2009	Garry Shandling	Magician Ed Alonzo
The "roof leak" episode: Ferguson shows up prepared in a yellow raincoat.
822	February 6, 2009	Kristen Bell, Alex Kapranos	Franz Ferdinand performs "Ulysses"
Last night of Magic Week: Assisted by magician Ed Alonzo, Ferguson cuts Kristen Bell in half, and later talks with fellow Glaswegian Alex Kapranos of the band Franz Ferdinand.
823	February 9, 2009	Michael Clarke Duncan, Richard Zoglin	Adele
824	February 10, 2009	Sean Combs, Olivia Williams	N/A
825	February 11, 2009	Steve Coogan, Connie Britton	N/A
826	February 12, 2009	Lewis Black, Shirley Manson; Drop-in guest Steven Wright	N/A
Ferguson briefly tells guest Shirley Manson the history of the long running Paul McCarney/Angela Lansbury picture gag.
827	February 13, 2009	Tom Selleck; Drop-in guest Tom Arnold	Glen Campbell performs "Rhinestone Cowboy"
828	February 16, 2009	David Boreanaz, Philip Johnson	Zac Brown Band performs "Chicken Fried"
829	February 17, 2009	Bill Maher, Chris Klein	N/A
830	February 18, 2009	Wynonna, Variety journalist Peter Bart	N/A
831	February 19, 2009	Paula Abdul, Carl Edwards; Drop-in guest Steven Wright	TBA
832	February 20, 2009	Rosie O'Donnell; Drop-in guest Dave Foley	The Knux sings "Bang, Bang"

=== March ===
No.	Original release date	Guest(s)	Musical/entertainment guest(s)
833	March 2, 2009	Paris Hilton, Dee Dee Myers	N/A
834	March 3, 2009	Kristin Davis, Wolfgang Puck	N/A
835	March 4, 2009	Desmond Tutu	N/A
836	March 5, 2009	Holly Hunter	Andrew Bird performs "Oh No"
837	March 6, 2009	Amy Adams; Betty White drops in for a comedy bit	M Ward performs "To Save Me"; Comedian Nick Griffin
838	March 9, 2009	Jason Segel, Dave Attell	N/A
839	March 10, 2009	Rosario Dawson, Gordon Ramsay	N/A
840	March 11, 2009	Tim Daly, Kara Cooney	N/A
841	March 12, 2009	Jim Parsons	Sara Bareilles performs "Gravity".
842	March 13, 2009	Christina Ricci	Mike Birbiglia
843	March 16, 2009	Regis Philbin	The Upper Crust performs "We're Finished With Finishing School"
844	March 17, 2009	Julia Louis-Dreyfus	Dropkick Murphys performs "Flannigan's Ball"
845	March 18, 2009	Steven Wright, Rashida Jones	N/A
Musical cold open: a reprise of "She Taught Me How to Yodel" sung by Frank Ifield, this time lip sync'd by puppets Kronos and friends.
846	March 23, 2009	Paul Rudd	Comedian George Wallace
847	March 24, 2009	Virginia Madsen, Jason Ritter	Chicago
848	March 25, 2009	Jerry O'Connell, Tucker Albrizzi, Patrick Pedraja	Ra Ra Riot performs "Can You Tell"
849	March 30, 2009	William Shatner, Regina King	N/A
850	March 31, 2009	Isabella Rossellini, Linda Cardellini; Drop-in guest Steven Wright; Thomas Lennon and Robert Ben Garant perform a Reno 911 skit	N/A

=== April ===
No.	Original release date	Guest(s)	Musical/entertainment guest(s)
851	April 1, 2009	Jennifer Tilly	Heidi Newfield
Comedy bit with Ferguson as Bono and show writer John T. Reynolds as Ferguson
852	April 2, 2009	Brittany Murphy, Christopher Gorham; drop-in guest Steven Wright	N/A
853	April 3, 2009	Zooey Deschanel, Lance Krall	N/A
854	April 13, 2009	Dwight Yoakam, Mary McCormack	N/A
Actress Mary McCormack gifts Ferguson with the soon-to-be-iconic rattlesnake mug from the American International Rattlesnake Museum in Albuquerque, New Mexico. He will use it on camera for the remainder of his tenure on The Late Late Show.
855	April 14, 2009	Adam Goldberg, Anna Gunn	Brett Dennen
856	April 15, 2009	Michael Caine, Matt Baetz	Matt Baetz, stand-up comedian
857	April 16, 2009	Madeleine Albright, Amy Smart	N/A
858	April 17, 2009	Jessica Lange, Thomas Lennon	Madeleine Peyroux
859	April 20, 2009	Simon Cowell	Erin McCarley
860	April 21, 2009	Rob Morrow, Jean-Michel Cousteau	N/A
861	April 22, 2009	Bob Barker, Jean Smart	N/A
862	April 23, 2009	Teri Hatcher	Martina McBride
863	April 24, 2009	Eddie Izzard	Chris Botti
864	April 27, 2009	Shirley Manson, Breckin Meyer	N/A
865	April 28, 2009	John McEnroe	N/A
866	April 29, 2009	Kenneth Branagh	Antony and the Johnsons
867	April 30, 2009	Michael Douglas, Carrie Ann Inaba	N/A

=== May ===
No.	Original release date	Guest(s)	Musical/entertainment guest(s)
868	May 1, 2009	Ryan Reynolds, Ricky Hatton	N/A
869	May 4, 2009	Jeffrey Dean Morgan, Stana Katic	N/A
870	May 5, 2009	George Hamilton	Jenny Lewis
871	May 6, 2009	Melina Kanakaredes, Nathan Fillion	Zac Brown Band plays "Whatever It Is"
872	May 7, 2009	Matthew McConaughey, Cokie Roberts	N/A
873	May 8, 2009	Amy Smart, Kunal Nayyar	N/A
874	May 11, 2009	Steven Wright, Bryce Dallas Howard; drop-in guest Henry Winkler	N/A
875	May 12, 2009	Paulina Porizkova, Andy Nulman	N/A
876	May 13, 2009	Laurence Fishburne, Paula Poundstone	N/A
877	May 14, 2009	Howie Mandel, Laura Lippman	N/A
878	May 15, 2009	Ewan McGregor	All American Rejects play "When the Wind Blows"
Ferguson, Ewan McGregor and writer Philip McGrade do an "ESPN UK" skit
879	May 18, 2009	Justin Long, Lawrence Block	N/A
Cold open lip sync number with puppets to Britney Spears' "Oops!... I Did It Again"; Dan McVicar of The Bold and the Beautiful drops in for a comedy bit.
880	May 19, 2009	Kathy Griffin, Nelson George	N/A
881	May 20, 2009	Guy Pearce	Hattie Hayridge, stand-up routine; Hensley plays "Beautiful"
882	May 21, 2009	John Waters	Manda Mosher plays "Lay Me Down"
883	May 22, 2009	Mark Ruffalo, Mindy Kaling	The Decemberists play "The Hazards of Love 2"
884	May 25, 2009	Bob Saget, P. W. Singer	N/A
885	May 26, 2009	Chris Isaak, Moon Bloodgood	Chris Isaak plays "You Don't Cry Like I Do"
Special guest Dave Foley drops in for a bit with writer John T. Reynolds playing the CBS censor.

=== June ===
No.	Original release date	Guest(s)	Musical/entertainment guest(s)
886	June 1, 2009	Mary-Louise Parker, Guillermo del Toro	Tori Amos performs "Welcome to England" from Abnormally Attracted to Sin
887	June 2, 2009	Denis Leary; special guest Betty White does a comic bit; Fozzy Bear appears in the cold open and closing segments	Diane Birch performs "Nothing But a Miracle" from Bible Belt
888	June 3, 2009	Jeffrey Tambor, Gabrielle Anwar	N/A
Musical cold open: lip sync to "Istanbul" by They Might Be Giantsby Ferguson and company
889	June 4, 2009	Elizabeth Perkins, Mark Burnett	Bernie Williams performs "Go For It" from Moving Forward
890	June 5, 2009	Chris Kattan, Henry Cho	Comedian Henry Cho
891	June 8, 2009	Kevin Bacon, Michael Irvin	N/A
892	June 9, 2009	Dame Edna Everage; drop-in guest Joel McHale	N/A
893	June 10, 2009	Chris Matthews; Tim Meadows appears in a comedy bit	Theresa Andersson performs "Na Na Na" from Hummingbird, Go!
894	June 11, 2009	Larry King, Anna Friel	N/A
Musical cold open: lip sync to Jason Mraz's "I'm Yours" by Ferguson and company
895	June 12, 2009	Dane Cook, Peter Travers	N/A
896	June 15, 2009	Holly Hunter	Camera Obscura performs "French Navy" from My Maudlin Career
897	June 16, 2009	Jeff Foxworthy	Gavin DeGraw performs "Dancing Shoes" from Free
898	June 17, 2009	Julia Ormond, Derrick Pitts	N/A
899	June 18, 2009	Sandra Bullock	Metric performs "Help I'm Alive" from Fantasies, comedian David Feldman
900	June 19, 2009	Bryan Cranston	Ben Kweller performs "Wantin' Her Again" from Changing Horses
901	June 22, 2009	Marion Cotillard, Michael Musto	N/A
902	June 23, 2009	Jim Parsons	N/A
903	June 24, 2009	Mary Steenburgen	Bettye LaVette sings "A Change Is Gonna Come"; comedian Todd Sawyer
904	June 25, 2009	Larry David, Wolfgang Puck	N/A
905	June 26, 2009	Lisa Kudrow, James Frey	Chairlift performs "Bruises" from Does You Inspire You

=== July ===
No.	Original release date	Guest(s)	Musical/entertainment guest(s)
906	July 6, 2009	Eric Idle, Dr. Lisa Masterson	N/A
907	July 7, 2009	Evan Rachel Wood, Christopher Gorham	N/A
908	July 8, 2009	Julie Chen, Michael Ian Black	Will Dailey
909	July 9, 2009	Jeff Goldblum, Jackie Collins	N/A
910	July 10, 2009	Ray Romano	Michael Bublé
911	July 13, 2009	Selma Blair, Connie Schultz	N/A
912	July 14, 2009	John Larroquette, Will Dailey	Charlie Viracola
913	July 15, 2009	Rosie Perez, Mike Massimino	N/A
914	July 16, 2009	Isaac Mizrahi, Shohreh Aghdashloo	N/A
915	July 17, 2009	Paris Hilton, Alan Furst	Ray LaMontagne
916	July 20, 2009	Margaret Cho, Michael Lewis	Eric Church
917	July 21, 2009	Gerard Butler, Jackie Collins	N/A
Musical cold open: Lip sync to "Fireball", theme song to Fireball XL5, introduced by Paris Hilton
918	July 22, 2009	Tom Lennon, Kelly Rowland	Dobie Maxwell
919	July 23, 2009	Cheryl Hines, Ben Mezrich	N/A
920	July 24, 2009	Rashida Jones, José Andrés	Jim Breuer
921	July 27, 2009	Chelsea Handler, Richard Wolffe	N/A
922	July 28, 2009	Christiane Amanpour, Johnny Galecki	N/A
923	July 29, 2009	Toni Collette, Rodney Carrington	N/A
924	July 30, 2009	James Spader, Rose Byrne	N/A
925	July 31, 2009	Saffron Burrows	N/A

=== August ===
No.	Original release date	Guest(s)	Musical/entertainment guest(s)
926	August 3, 2009	Edie Falco, Les Stroud	Lisa Landry
927	August 4, 2009	Tony Shalhoub, Minka Kelly	N/A
928	August 5, 2009	Wolf Blitzer, Rose Byrne	N/A
929	August 6, 2009	Zooey Deschanel	Glasvegas
930	August 7, 2009	Don Rickles	Sharon Jones & The Dap-Kings
931	August 10, 2009	Carrot Top, Alexis Bledel	N/A
932	August 11, 2009	Betty White, Mitch Albom	Bonnie Raitt & Taj Mahal
933	August 12, 2009	Eric Bana, Holly Williams	N/A
934	August 13, 2009	Jon Cryer	N/A
935	August 14, 2009	Liza Minnelli, Kara Cooney	N/A
936	August 31, 2009	Emily Deschanel, Terry Crews	N/A

=== September ===
No.	Original release date	Guest(s)	Musical/entertainment guest(s)
937	September 1, 2009	Quentin Tarantino	N/A
938	September 2, 2009	Mila Kunis	N/A
939	September 3, 2009	Carrie Fisher, DJ Qualls	N/A
940	September 4, 2009	Radha Mitchell, Jason Ritter	N/A
941	September 7, 2009	Juliette Lewis, Alex O'Loughlin; Betty White reads from Ferguson's American on Purpose	Juliette Lewis performs "Fantasy Bar"
942	September 8, 2009	Neil Patrick Harris; Dame Edna Everidge reads from American on Purpose	Spencer Day performs "'Till You Come to Me"
943	September 9, 2009	Danny DeVito; Kevin Bacon reads from American on Purpose	N/A
944	September 10, 2009	Audrey Tautou, Ron Livingston	N/A
Ferguson discusses Representative Joe Wilson's outburst during President Obama's September 9th address to a joint session of Congress.
945	September 11, 2009	Drew Carey, Mindy Kaling; Holly Hunter reads from American on Purpose	N/A
946	September 21, 2009	Marg Helgenberger, Dulé Hill; John Waters reads from American on Purpose	Black Joe Lewis & the Honeybears perform "Sugarfoot" from Tell 'Em What...
947	September 22, 2009	Reba McEntire, Dave Annable	Reba McEntire performs "Consider Me Gone" from Keep On Loving You
948	September 23, 2009	Jennifer Love Hewitt, Ken Tucker	Arctic Monkeys
949	September 24, 2009	Jason Schwartzman, Angela Kinsey; Reba McEntire reads from American on Purpose	N/A
950	September 25, 2009	Ted Danson, Chris Miller, Phil Lord; Marg Helgenberger reads from American on Purpose	N/A
951	September 28, 2009	Chris O'Donnell, Paula Poundstone	Comedienne Paula Poundstone
952	September 29, 2009	James Spader	Comedienne Cathy Ladman; Laura Izibor performs "From My Heart to Yours" from Let the Truth Be Told
953	September 30, 2009	Jenna Elfman, Dom Irrera	Comedian Dom Irrera

=== October ===
No.	Original release date	Guest(s)	Musical/entertainment guest(s)
954	October 1, 2009	Patricia Arquette, Dominic Cooper	N/A
955	October 2, 2009	Tim Gunn, Cobie Smulders	Lynyrd Skynyrd
956	October 5, 2009	Michael Sheen, Viola Davis	Jack Ingram
957	October 6, 2009	Julia Louis-Dreyfus	The Avett Brothers
958	October 7, 2009	Rachel Bilson, David Milch	N/A
959	October 8, 2009	Jean Reno, Sophia Bush	N/A
960	October 9, 2009	Gerard Butler	Phoenix
961	October 12, 2009	David Boreanaz, Mitch Albom	Dierks Bentley
962	October 13, 2009	Tim Robbins, Adam Goldberg	N/A
963	October 14, 2009	Kristen Bell, Robert Carlyle	N/A
964	October 15, 2009	Forest Whitaker, Adam Savage, Jamie Hyneman	A Fine Frenzy
965	October 16, 2009	Michelle Monaghan, Toby Keith	Toby Keith
"Party at Elton John's House" sketch with show writer John T. Reynolds as Ferguson; Ferguson as Elton John; Salman Rushdie as himself, and Bradley Laise as the tiny dancer.
966	October 26, 2009	Sherri Shepherd, Alex Dryden	N/A
967	October 27, 2009	Alicia Silverstone, Salman Rushdie	N/A
Musical cold open lip sync to "In the Navy" by the Village People
968	October 28, 2009	Madeleine Albright	Rodrigo y Gabriela
969	October 29, 2009	Newt Gingrich	N/A
970	October 30, 2009	Lauren Graham, Jessalyn Gilsig	Fruit Bats

=== November ===
No.	Original release date	Guest(s)	Musical/entertainment guest(s)
971	November 2, 2009	Billy Connolly, George Eads	Jack Ingram performs "Seeing Stars"
972	November 3, 2009	Valerie Bertinelli, Dave Barry; Gerard Butler reads from Ferguson's autobiography	N/A
973	November 4, 2009	Mo'Nique, Stephen Fry	N/A
Discusses including awkward pauses, which will become a regular device on the show.
974	November 5, 2009	Denis Leary, Jena Malone	N/A
975	November 6, 2009	Ewan McGregor, Anthony Zuiker	Regina Spektor performs "Eet"
976	November 9, 2009	Carla Gugino, Dennis Lehane; Josh Robert Thompson appears in skit as Arnold Schwarzenegger	N/A
When his staff doesn't perform as expected, Ferguson enjoys hassling show producer Michael Naidus for several days in a row, an activity that will eventually become a regular feature on the show.
977	November 10, 2009	Adam Arkin, Nina García	N/A
978	November 11, 2009	Kenneth Branagh	N/A
979	November 12, 2009	Trace Adkins	Nick Griffin
980	November 13, 2009	Harry Connick Jr., Peter Sagal	N/A
981	November 16, 2009	LL Cool J, Mindy Kaling	N/A
When the audience sides with producer Michael Naidus, it provides Ferguson with much ad lib material for several rants and a unique ending vignette.
982	November 17, 2009	Woody Harrelson, Joe Theismann	N/A
983	November 18, 2009	David Duchovny, Lewis Black	N/A
984	November 19, 2009	Sandra Bullock, Ben Foster	N/A
985	November 20, 2009	Neil Patrick Harris	David Grey
986	November 23, 2009	Margaret Cho, Carl Edwards	N/A
987	November 24, 2009	Maria Bello, Peter Capaldi	Relentless7
988	November 25, 2009	Robin Wright, Wolfgang Puck	N/A
989	November 30, 2009	Michael Sheen, Carl Bernstein	N/A

=== December ===
No.	Original release date	Guest(s)	Musical/entertainment guest(s)
990	December 1, 2009	Joel McHale	The Swell Season
991	December 2, 2009	Paul Shaffer, Shohreh Aghdashloo	N/A
992	December 3, 2009	George Lopez	OneRepublic performs "Counting Stars"
993	December 4, 2009	Emily Blunt, David Bianculli	N/A
994	December 7, 2009	Shirley Manson, Mitch Albom	N/A
995	December 8, 2009	Michael Clarke Duncan, Gillian Jacobs	N/A
996	December 9, 2009	Morgan Freeman	Overtone
997	December 10, 2009	Howie Mandel, Paula Marshall	N/A
998	December 11, 2009	Jim Parsons	They Might Be Giants performs "Why Does the Sun Shine? (The Sun Is a Mass of Incandescent Gas)"
999	December 14, 2009	Joshua Jackson, Lake Bell	Reba McEntire performs "Strange"
After traveling to Nashville for standup, Ferguson's flight was overbooked. He tells the story and takes the opportunity to thoroughly dress down the relevant airline.
1,000	December 15, 2009	Jason Schwartzman, Maria Bello, Kristen Bell	Puppet Count Dracula (Jason Segel), performs "Dracula's Lament", accompanied by The Broken West
Special 1000th episode: puppet Wavy Rancheros takes over hosting duties as the puppets run the show; special musical opening dance to Trace Adkins' "Honky Tonk Badonkadonk", and closing number to James Taylor's "You've Got a Friend" in this classic episode.
1,001	December 16, 2009	Bob Barker, Greta Van Susteren	N/A
1,002	December 17, 2009	Sigourney Weaver, Hank Stuever	N/A
1,003	December 18, 2009	Judi Dench, Michelle Rodriguez	N/A
1,004	December 21, 2009	Special drop-in guest Betty White	Renée Fleming sings selections from composer Umberto Giordano; comedian Jim McDonald
1,005	December 22, 2009	Kathy Griffin; Tim Meadows and Paul Schaffer perform a skit	Harry Connick Jr. performs "Christmas Day"
1,006	December 23, 2009	Paris Hilton, José Andrés	N/A

== 2010 ==
=== January ===
No.	Original release date	Guest(s)	Musical/entertainment guest(s)
1,007	January 4, 2010	Rosie Perez	Switchfoot performs "Always" from Hello Hurricane
1,008	January 5, 2010	Patricia Heaton	Yonder Mountain String Band performs "Out of the Blue" from The Show
1,009	January 6, 2010	Ray Romano, Herb Alpert	Herb Alpert and Lani Hall perform a medley from their Grammy-nominated album Anything Goes
1,010	January 7, 2010	Comedian Steven Wright, Michelle Monaghan; Kathy Griffin phones regarding the CNN New Year's Eve broadcast	Comedian Steven Wright
1,011	January 8, 2010	Jason Segel	N/A
1,012	January 11, 2010	Mila Kunis	Nellie McKay plays "The Very Thought of You" from Normal as Blueberry Pie – A Tribute to Doris Day
1,013	January 12, 2010	Carey Mulligan, Paula Poundstone	Comedienne Paula Poundstone
1,014	January 13, 2010	Comedian Richard Lewis	N/A
1,015	January 14, 2010	Julie Andrews, Amber Valletta	Vampire Weekend with the Calder Quartet play "Horchata" from Contra
1,016	January 15, 2010	Thomas Lennon, Shiri Appleby	Luke Bryan
1,017	January 18, 2010	Marion Cotillard, Steve Jones	The Hotrats and Steve Jones, formerly of the Sex Pistols, play "E.M.I.", from the 1977 Never Mind the Bollocks, Here's the Sex Pistols
1,018	January 19, 2010	Alan Alda, Anna Kendrick	N/A
1,019	January 20, 2010	Keri Russell, Jake Johannsen	Comedian Jake Johannsen
1,020	January 21, 2010	Adam Goldberg, Abbie Cornish	N/A
1,021	January 22, 2010	Grant Imahara, Tory Belleci, Kari Byron	The Hotrats play "Pump It Up"
1,022	January 25, 2010	Director, comedian, and author Carl Reiner, Alicia Witt	N/A
1,023	January 26, 2010	Musician 50 Cent, Adrianne Palicki	N/A
1,024	January 27, 2010	Comedian Eddie Izzard, chef Myron Mixon	N/A
1,025	January 28, 2010	Rosie O'Donnell	Wilco
Cold open: Rosie O'Donnell lip syncs to Robert Palmer's "Addicted to Love" with Ferguson and company
1,026	January 29, 2010	Jon Heder	Corinne Bailey Rae performs "I'd Do It All Again" from The Sea; comedienne Dana Eagle

=== February ===
No.	Original release date	Guest(s)	Musical/entertainment guest(s)
1,027	February 4, 2010	Tina Brown, Chris Kattan	N/A
1,028	February 5, 2010	Jill Scott, Claire Danes	N/A
1,029	February 9, 2010	Pierce Brosnan, Patty Griffin	N/A
1,030	February 9, 2010	Donald Glover, Carrie Fisher	N/A
Tweets are included in email segment for the first time.
1,031	February 10, 2010	Gabourey Sidibe, Jeff Stilson	OK Go
1,032	February 11, 2010	Don Rickles, Sonya Walger	N/A
1,033	February 12, 2010	Carey Mulligan	David Nail
1,034	February 15, 2010	Colin Firth; Puppet Wavy Rancheros does the cold open	N/A
1,035	February 16, 2010	Matt Lucas; Bob Saget drops in for tweets and emails	Your Lips Your Lips perform "Never Again"
1,036	February 17, 2010	Helena Bonham Carter; Cold open skit with Jerry Springer	N/A
Origins of Geoff Peterson: Ferguson refers to the skull marotte created for him by the props department as his sidekick.
1,037	February 18, 2010	Jennifer Tilly, Jimmie Johnson; Puppet Wavy Rancheros does the cold open Josh Robert Thompson voices "'Morgan Freeman's' Guide to the Winter Olympics"	N/A
Origins of Geoff Peterson: Ferguson announces that he will have a robot skeleton made to be his sidekick.
1,038	February 19, 2010	NPR announcer Peter Sagal, Topher Grace	N/A
1,039	February 22, 2010	Tom Everett Scott, Parker Posey	N/A
1,040	February 23, 2010	Stephen Fry	N/A
English actor, comedian, director and writer Stephen Fry is the sole guest in this special tribute to The Late Late Show with Tom Snyder, presented without the regular studio audience.
1,041	February 24, 2010	Don Cheadle, Jeannette Walls; Cheadle and Tim Meadows do a skit for the cold open.	N/A
1,042	February 25, 2010	Seann William Scott, Jackie Collins; Eddie Izzard drops in to read emails	N/A
1,043	February 26, 2010	Quentin Tarantino	Mumford & Sons perform "The Cave" from Sigh No More

=== March ===
No.	Original release date	Guest(s)	Musical/entertainment guest(s)
1,045	March 2, 2010	Steven Wright, Mitch Albom	Mumiy Troll performs "Polar Bear"
Origins of Geoff Peterson: Ferguson announces that Grant Imahara of MythBusters got 100,000 Twitter followers, and will be building him a robot skeleton sidekick
1,046	March 3, 2010	Michael Sheen, Amy Ryan	TBA
Michael Sheen arrives early for tweets and emails, and stays through the end of the show in a Graham Norton Show-style episode
1,047	March 4, 2010	Jeffrey Tambor, Sonya Walger	Regina Spektor performs "The Calculation" from Far
1,048	March 5, 2010	Dax Shepard, Paula Deen	TBA
1,049	March 8, 2010	Isaac Mizrahi	Miranda Lambert performs "White Liar" from Revolution
1,050	March 9, 2010	Lisa Kudrow, Adhir Kalyan	TBA
Origins of Geoff Peterson: Ferguson narrates a brief comedic history of late night, including Grant Imahara's beginning to build robot skeleton sidekick Geoff Peterson
1,051	March 10, 2010	Dominic Monaghan, Lindsay Sloane	The Temper Trap performs "Sweet Disposition", featured in the soundtrack to 500 Days of Summer
1,052	March 11, 2010	Lisa Kudrow; Eddie Izzard drops in for emails and tweets	TBA
1,053	March 12, 2010	George Hamilton; Astronaut Mike Massimino	TBA
1,054	March 22, 2010	John Cusack, Lana Parrilla	TBA
1,055	March 23, 2010	Jay Baruchel, Regis Philbin	Regis and Joy Philbin sing "Two Sleepy People"
1,056	March 24, 2010	Jonah Hill, Emily Procter	TBA
1,057	March 29, 2010	Joel McHale; Steve Jones formerly of the Sex Pistols does a comedy skit	TBA
1,058	March 30, 2010	Ben McKenzie; Ferguson, Chunky B and Bradley Laise do a (Prince) "Charles!" skit	V V Brown sings "Shark in the Water" from Travelling Like the Light
Origins of Geoff Peterson: Clip of Grant Imahara's progress on robot skeleton sidekick Geoff Peterson
1,059	March 31, 2010	Wanda Sykes	TBA
In the cold open, puppet Wavy Rancheros announces The Late Late Show has won a Peabody Award for the March 4, 2009 episode with Archbishop Desmond Tutu

=== April ===
No.	Original release date	Guest(s)	Musical/entertainment guest(s)
1,060	April 1, 2010	Robin Williams; Philosopher Jonathan Dancy	N/A
1,061	April 2, 2010	John Corbett, Joss Stone	Joss Stone and Jamie Hartman perform "Stalemate" from Battling Giants
1,062	April 5, 2010	Kristen Bell, Grant Imahara	N/A
Musical cold open: lip sync to "Look Out There's a Monster Coming" by the Bonzo Dog Doo-Dah Band for the debut of robot skeleton sidekick Geoff Peterson. Created by guest Grant Imahara of The Mythbusters, Geoff will become a permanent character on the show. He is initially voiced with a recorded robotic version of Ferguson's voice.
1,063	April 6, 2010	Mindy Kaling, Dom Irrera	Comedian Dom Irrera
1,064	April 7, 2010	Raquel Welch, Anna Torv; Michael Clark Duncan reads from Jennifer Love Hewitt's book, The Day I Shot Cupid	N/A
1,065	April 8, 2010	Jennifer Love Hewitt; Stuart Neville author of The Ghosts of Belfast	N/A
1,066	April 9, 2010	Kunal Nayyar; Betty White drops in for a comedy bit Outtakes of Michael Clarke Duncan	Slash performs "By the Sword" from his self-titled album, featuring vocalist Andrew Stockdale
Close: Ferguson discusses Geoff Peterson as an allegory
1,067	April 12, 2010	Tim Gunn; former Drew Carey Show costar Kathy Kinney	N/A
1,068	April 13, 2010	James Marsden, Charlyne Yi	N/A
Cold open with chicken puppet "Agatha" and pig puppet "Gustave Flaubert"
1,069	April 14, 2010	Andie MacDowell; IndyCar driver Dario Franchitti	Dawes performs "When My Time Comes" from North Hills
1,070	April 15, 2010	Kirstie Alley	Sade
1,071	April 16, 2010	Willie Nelson, Ellie Kemper	Willie Nelson performs "Man With the Blues" from 2010's Country Music, originally recorded in 1959.
1,072	April 19, 2010	Brendan Fraser, Amanda Righetti; Gardening Tips with Willie Nelson skit	Comedian Brian Scott McFadden
1,073	April 20, 2010	Emily Mortimer; Gardening Tips with Willie Nelson skit	Comedian Randy Kagan; Miranda Lambert performs "The House That Built Me" from Revolution
1,074	April 21, 2010	Brooke Shields, George Wallace	Corinne Bailey Rae performs "Closer" from The Sea
1,075	April 22, 2010	Jeffrey Dean Morgan, Busy Philipps; Gardening Tips with Willie Nelson skit	N/A
1,076	April 23, 2010	Drew Carey; Gardening Tips with Willie Nelson skit	Jason Aldean performs "Crazy Town" from Wide Open
1,077	April 29, 2010	Tom Selleck, Lance Burton	Magician Lance Burton is introduced by Neil Patrick Harris
1,078	April 30, 2010	NPR broadcaster Peter Sagal; Lauren Graham drops by to read emails Style tips with Tim Gunn, 80's edition Gardening tips with Willie Nelson	N/A

=== May ===
No.	Original air date	Guest(s)	Musical/entertainment guest(s)
1,079	May 3, 2010	Morgan Freeman, Kate Mara; Gardening Tips with Willie Nelson skit	
1,080	May 4, 2010	Andy García, Donald Glover	
1,081	May 5, 2010	Scarlett Johansson	
1,082	May 6, 2010	Mark Harmon, Sophia Bush	Local Natives performs "Airplanes" from Gorilla Manor
1,083	May 7, 2010	Seth MacFarlane; Steven Wright drops in for tweets and emails	Comedian Matt Baetz
1,084	May 10, 2010	Russell Crowe; Style Tips with Tim Gunn '80s Edition	Wilco performs "Deeper Down" from Wilco (The Album)
1,085	May 11, 2010	Melina Kanakaredes, Tom Lennon	Jónsi (of Sigur Rós) performs "Go Do" from Go
1,086	May 12, 2010	Bryan Cranston, Angela Kinsey; Gardening Tips with Willie Nelson	
1,087	May 13, 2010	Robert Downey Jr. Gardening Tips with Willie Nelson	
1,088	May 14, 2010	Amanda Seyfried, Isabel Allende; Style Tips with Tim Gunn '80s Edition; Gardening Tips with Willie Nelson	
1,089	May 18, 2010	Jon Favreau	Jakob Dylan performs "Nothing But the Whole Wide World" from Women + Country
1,090	May 19, 2010	Dennis Quaid, Alice Eve; Donald Glover drops in for tweets and emails	
1,091	May 20, 2010	Holly Hunter; Style Tips with Tim Gunn 80's Edition	The Hold Steady perform "Rock Problems" from Heaven is Whenever
1,092	May 21, 2010	Ben Kingsley	Court Yard Hounds (a side project of Martie Maguire and Emily Strayer of The Chicks (formerly The Dixie Chicks)) perform "The Coast" from Court Yard Hounds
1,093	May 24, 2010	Ben Stein	Mishka performs "Bittersweet" from Talk About; Comedian Craig Shoemaker
1,094	May 25, 2010	Kristin Davis, Judd Apatow Style tips with Tim Gunn 80's Edition The show's closing ("What Did We Learn on the Show Tonight, Craig?") features the first appearance of the rabbit puppet to become known as "Sid the Cussing Bunny".	
1,095	May 26, 2010	Antonio Banderas, Paula Poundstone	
1,096	May 27, 2010	Michael Sheen; First cold open appearance of "Sid the Cussing Bunny"	Band of Horses performs "Compliments" from Infinite Arms
1,097	May 28, 2010	Shirley Manson, Jeffrey Ross	The National performs "Anyone's Ghost" from High Violet

=== June ===
No.	Original release date	Guest(s)	Musical/entertainment guest(s)
1,098	June 2, 2010	Evangeline Lilly, Charlyne Yi	Magicians Larry and Rafael
1,099	June 3, 2010	Adam Goldberg	Magician Jamy Ian Smith
1,100	June 4, 2010	Jennifer Tilly; ESPN UK skit with Ferguson, Philip McGrade and Ben Kingsley; Gardening Tips with Willie Nelson	Magician Ed Alonzo
1,101	June 7, 2010	Eric Idle, Terry Crews	TBA
1,102	June 8, 2010	John Waters, Taraji P. Henson; Cold open: skit with Ferguson, John Waters and Bradley Laise	TBA
1,103	June 9, 2010	Kyra Sedgwick, Tom Felton; Cold open: Ferguson's suit is not ready.	TBA
1,104	June 10, 2010	Chef Wolfgang Puck; Ferguson and NBC's Jimmy Fallon call a late night truce and wave from their respective shows with a large Mickey Mouse glove	Damian Marley and Nas perform "As We Enter" from Distant Relatives
1,105	June 11, 2010	Denis Leary	Comedian John "Hippieman" Novosad
1,106	June 14, 2010	Bradley Whitford	Shelby Lynne, Comedian Jeff Stilson
1,106	June 15, 2010	Ice Cube, Stan Lee	Comedienne Tig Notaro
1,107	June 16, 2010	Tim Allen; Josh Robert Thompson voices "Morgan Freeman's Guide to the World Cup"	TBA
1,108	June 17, 2010	Virginia Madsen, Chris Hardwick	Justin Currie of Del Amitri, Glaswegian friend of Ferguson, performs "You'll Always Walk Alone" from The Great War
1,109	June 18, 2010	Mark Ruffalo, Saffron Burrows	TBA
1,110	June 21, 2010	Maria Bello, DJ Qualls	TBA
1,111	June 22, 2010	Valerie Bertinelli, Jerry Ferrara	TBA
1,112	June 23, 2010	Julia Ormond, José Andrés	TBA
1,100	June 4, 2010	Lisa Kudrow, James Dyson	Robert David Hall performs the title track from Things They Don't Teach You In School
1,114	June 25, 2010	Tim Meadows, Jean-Michel Cousteau	TBA
1,115	June 28, 2010	Howie Mandel, Jane Adams	TBA
1,116	June 29, 2010	Carl Reiner, Rebecca Mader	Sharon Jones & the Dap-Kings
1,117	June 30, 2010	Mindy Kaling, Chef Myron Mixon	TBA

=== July ===
No.	Original air date	Guest(s)	Musical/entertainment guest(s)
1,118	July 1, 2010	Kathy Griffin, Michael Vartan	Alicia Witt
1,119	July 2, 2010	Dennis Eckersley	Dr. Dog
1,120	July 12, 2010	Julie Chen, Michael Ian Black	Dierks Bentley
1,121	July 13, 2010	Marion Cotillard	Louie Anderson
1,122	July 14, 2010	Alfred Molina, Cathy Ladman	
1,123	July 15, 2010	Nicolas Cage	Marina and the Diamonds
1,124	July 16, 2010	Elliot Page	
1,125	July 19, 2010	Jeffrey Dean Morgan, Mary Lynn Rajskub	
1,126	July 20, 2010	America Ferrera, Dan Riskin	
1,127	July 21, 2010	Ted Danson, Kevin Pollak	
1,128	July 22, 2010	Michael Clarke Duncan, Daniela Ruah	
1,129	July 23, 2010	Paulina Porizkova	MGMT
1,130	July 26, 2010	Steve Carell	She & Him
1,131	July 27, 2010	Morgan Freeman	The Black Keys
1,132	July 28, 2010	Carrie Fisher, Ron Livingston	
1,133	July 29, 2010	Neil Patrick Harris, Dr. Sanjay Gupta	
1,134	July 30, 2010	Mary Lynn Rajskub, Christopher Gorham	

=== August ===
No.	Original air date	Guest(s)	Musical/entertainment guest(s)
1,135	August 2, 2010	George Hamilton	Comedian Fred MacAulay
1,136	August 3, 2010	Jeffrey Tambor	Drew Thomas
1,137	August 4, 2010	Julie Chen, Paula Poundstone	Comedian Paula Poundstone
1,138	August 5, 2010	Paris Hilton, Alex Dryden	
1,139	August 6, 2010	Mark Wahlberg, Jacinda Barrett	
1,140	August 9, 2010	Lindsay Sloane	Vampire Weekend
1,141	August 10, 2010	David Duchovny, Dave Barry	
1,142	August 11, 2010	Maggie Gyllenhaal; Betty White drops in for a comedy bit	
1,143	August 12, 2010	Emma Thompson	Comedian Carlos Alazraqui
1,144	August 13, 2010	Anna Kendrick; Chris Hardwick drops in for tweets and emails; "Murder She Wrote" skit with Alfred Molina	
1,145	August 30, 2010	Adam Goldberg	Chief perform "Night and Day" from Modern Rituals
1,146	August 31, 2010	Don Johnson, Laura Lippman; James Lipton appears in cold open skit	

=== September ===
No.	Original air date	Guest(s)	Musical/entertainment guest(s)
1,147	September 1, 2010	Rachael Ray, William Knoedelseder, author of I'm Dying Up Here: Heartbreak and High Times in Standup Comedy's Golden Age	
1,148	September 2, 2010	Billy Gardell; Chris Hardwick drops in for tweets and emails	Sara Watkins performs "Where Will You Be?" from her self-titled album
1,149	September 3, 2010	Brooke Shields; DJ Qualls drops in for tweets and emails	
1,150	September 6, 2010	John Larroquette, Malin Åkerman; Cold open with both Sid the Cussing Bunny and Wavy Rancheros simultaneously puppeteered by Ferguson	
1,151	September 7, 2010	Chris Kattan, Rob Stewart	
1,152	September 8, 2010	James Lipton, Monica Potter	
1,153	September 9, 2010	Rashida Jones, Dr. Mehmet Oz	Blake Shelton performs the title track from All About Tonight
1,154	September 10, 2010	Donald Glover, Katey Sagal	Norah Jones performs "Man of the Hour" from The Fall
1,155	September 13, 2010	Philip Seymour Hoffman	
1,156	September 14, 2010	Kristen Bell	Sarah McLachlan performs "Forgiveness" from Laws of Illusion
1,157	September 15, 2010	Don Rickles, Ellie Kemper	
1,158	September 16, 2010	William Shatner; Shatner and Ferguson do a bit in the cold open and get physical during the interview	
1,159	September 17, 2010	Tim Gunn, Jennifer Finnigan	
1,160	September 20, 2010	Mindy Kaling, broadcast journalist Steve Hartman	
1,161	September 21, 2010	Patricia Heaton, Adam Brody	Sara Bareilles performs "King of Everything" from Kaleidoscope Heart
1,162	September 22, 2010	Johnny Galecki, Jim Parsons, Kaley Cuoco and Simon Helberg from The Big Bang Theory	
1,163	September 23, 2010	Jon Hamm; Jonathan Ames, creator of Bored to Death; Betty White drops in for a comedy bit	
1,164	September 24, 2010	John Schwartzman; Schwartzman and Betty White appear in a skit Ferguson announces he will voice Owl in the new animated 2011 film Winnie the Pooh; Geoff Peterson does a remote spot at the premiere of You Again	Willie Nelson performs "Freight Train Boogie"
1,165	September 27, 2010	Sela Ward, Guillermo del Toro	
1,166	September 28, 2010	David Boreanaz, Melissa McCarthy	
1,167	September 29, 2010	Steven Wright, Sloane Crosley; Wright briefly plays the harmonica with Ferguson and discusses working without a net	Blake Shelton performs "Who Are You When I'm Not Looking" from All About Tonight
1,168	September 30, 2010	Edward Norton, Odette Yustman	

=== October ===
No.	Original release date	Guest(s)	Musical/entertainment guest(s)
1,169	October 1, 2010	Carey Mulligan	Comedian Marc Maron
1,170	October 4, 2010	Lauren Graham	Rosanne Cash
1,171	October 5, 2010	Alfred Molina	Comedienne Cory Kahaney
Musical cold open: Mythbusters Adam Savage and Jamie Hyneman join Ferguson, Wavy, Sid and company to lip sync to "I Melt With You" by Modern English; Chris Hardwick drops in for "tweetmails"
1,172	October 6, 2010	Debra Winger, Adhir Kalyan	Julie Gribble performs the title track from her album Letting Go
1,173	October 7, 2010	Toby Keith, Louie Anderson	Comedian Louie Anderson; Toby Keith performs the title track from Bullets in the Gun
1,174	October 8, 2010	Mary Lynn Rajskub; NASCAR driver Carl Edwards	N/A
Pantomime horse "Secretariat" makes his first appearance in a parody of the trailer for the film Secretariat
1,175	October 11, 2010	John Malkovich	N/A
Pantomime horse Secretariat, who will become a regular on the show, makes his first live appearance. He will appear frequently on the show, and in the fall of 2012 become a permanent "cast member".
1,176	October 12, 2010	Trace Adkins, astronomer Derrick Pitts	Trace Adkins performs "This Ain't No Love Song" from Cowboy's Back in Town
Secretariat makes his second appearance and has trouble finding the door
1,177	October 13, 2010	Minnie Driver, Diedrich Bader	N/A
1,178	October 14, 2010	Drew Carey, Jenny Wade	N/A
Remote segment of Geoff Peterson, "live", voiced ad-lib by Josh Robert Thompson at the premiere of the movie Red. There he chats briefly with Morgan Freeman, Richard Dreyfus, John Malkovich, Mary Louise Parker, Red director Taylor Hackford, Sylvester Stallone and Bruce Willis
1,179	October 15, 2010	Julie Chen, Ty Burrell	Billy Currington performs "Pretty Good at Drinkin' Beer" from Enjoy Yourself
1,180	October 25, 2010	Condoleezza Rice, Joe Theismann	N/A
1,181	October 26, 2010	Danny DeVito, Brie Larson	Comedian Henry Cho
DeVito appears in the cold open skit
1,182	October 27, 2010	Marg Helgenberger, Donald Glover	N/A
1,183	October 28, 2010	Michael Caine	N/A
Closing segment: Ferguson reflects on his journey from youthful misadventures to hosting a chat show with Sir Michael Caine as a guest.
1,184	October 29, 2010	Jason Segel, Alison Brie	Comedian Adam Hills
Musical cold open: Halloween lip sync by Ferguson, puppets and company to Bobby "Boris" Pickett's "Monster Mash"

=== November ===
No.	Original air date	Guest(s)	Musical/entertainment guest(s)
1,185	November 1, 2010	Tyler Perry, Sophia Bush	
1,186	November 3, 2010	Lewis Black, Jayma Mays	Dr. Dog
1,187	November 4, 2010	Dick Van Dyke, Kerry Washington Cold Open: Samuel L. Jackson with Craig outside Dick Van Dyke's dressing room.	
1,188	November 5, 2010	Juliette Lewis, Cornel West	
1,189	November 8, 2010	Tom Selleck	Myq Kaplan
1,190	November 9, 2010	Cheryl Hines, Wolfgang Puck	
1,191	November 10, 2010	Tim Meadows, Stan Lee	
1,192	November 11, 2010	Rosie Perez, Quinton Jackson	
1,193	November 12, 2010	Carrie Ann Inaba	Bettye LaVette
1,194	November 15, 2010	Dennis Miller, Bianca Kajlich	
1,195	November 16, 2010	Chris Hardwick, Matt Smith	
1,196	November 17, 2010	Russell Crowe	
1,197	November 18, 2010	Jeff Goldblum	
1,198	November 19, 2010	Amy Sedaris, Adam Savage, Jamie Hyneman	
1,199	November 22, 2010	Ben Stein, Dr. Lisa Masterson	The Very Best
1,200	November 23, 2010	Mark Ruffalo, Kathryn Hahn	
1,201	November 24, 2010	Dwayne Johnson, Paula Deen	
1,202	November 29, 2010	Michael Sheen	
1,203	November 30, 2010	DJ Qualls, Salman Rushdie	

=== December ===
No.	Original air date	Guest(s)	Musical/entertainment guest(s)
1,204	December 1, 2010	Regis Philbin	Wendy Liebman
1,205	December 2, 2010	Cedric the Entertainer, Chris Hardwick	Norah Jones
1,206	December 3, 2010	Kristen Bell	Michael Franti and Spearhead
1,207	December 6, 2010	Katie Couric	Al Madrigal
1,208	December 7, 2010	Carrie Fisher, Dennis Lehane	
1,209	December 8, 2010	Russell Brand, Richard Wolffe	
1,210	December 9, 2010	Lucy Liu, Jody Williams	
1,211	December 10, 2010	Neil Patrick Harris	Nellie McKay
1,212	December 13, 2010	Tom Arnold, Alison Becker	
1,213	December 14, 2010	Kirsten Dunst	Greg Proops
1,214	December 15, 2010	Nick Lachey	Jamy Ian Swiss
1,215	December 16, 2010	Seth Green, Lena Dunham	
1,216	December 17, 2010	Billy Connolly, Maria Bamford Billy Connolly is awarded the first-ever "Golden Mouth Organ"	
1,217	December 20, 2010	Kristin Davis, Dick Cavett	
1,218	December 21, 2010	Jane Fonda, Grant Imahara	
1,219	December 22, 2010	Michael Clarke Duncan, Grant Imahara	
1,220	December 23, 2010	Kathy Griffin	Ruth Gerson

== 2011 ==
=== January ===
No.	Original air date	Guest(s)	Musical/entertainment guest(s)
1,223	January 3, 2011	Lisa Kudrow	Matt Braunger
1,224	January 4, 2011	Julie Bowen, Carson Kressley	
1,225	January 5, 2011	Henry Winkler, Paula Deen	
1,226	January 6, 2011	Gary Sinise, Alex Kingston	
1,227	January 7, 2011	Mila Kunis	Geechy Guy
1,228	January 10, 2011	Roseanne Barr, Joe Theismann, Tuyen & Lisa in the cold open	
1,229	January 11, 2011	Paula Abdul	Dave Attell
1,230	January 12, 2011	David Duchovny, Jo Frost	
1,231	January 13, 2011	Denis Leary	Kathleen Madigan
1,232	January 14, 2011	Paul Giamatti, Piper Perabo	
1,233	January 17, 2011	Rashida Jones, Tony Goldwyn	
1,234	January 18, 2011	Larry King, Shannon Woodward	
1,235	January 19, 2011	Emily Deschanel	Rich Fulcher
1,236	January 20, 2011	Maria Bello, Dan Riskin	
1,237	January 21, 2011	Jeff Bridges, Melissa Rauch	
1,238	January 24, 2011	Valerie Bertinelli, Pau Gasol	
1,239	January 25, 2011	Jennifer Love Hewitt, Jon Lovitz	
1,240	January 26, 2011	Betty White, Ellie Kemper	
1,241	January 27, 2011	Adam Goldberg, Shannon Woodward	
1,242	January 28, 2011	Helena Bonham Carter	Larry Gatlin and the Gatlin Brothers
1,243	January 31, 2011	Rachael Ray	

=== February ===
No.	Original air date	Guest(s)	Musical/entertainment guest(s)
1,244	February 1, 2011	Cornel West	George Clinton and P-Funk
1,245	February 2, 2011	Jim Parsons	
1,246	February 3, 2011	Matt LeBlanc, David Pogue	
1,247	February 4, 2011	Matt Lucas	
1,248	February 7, 2011	Gabrielle Union	Kurt Metzger
1,249	February 8, 2011	Emily Blunt, Kara Cooney	
1,250	February 9, 2011	Carl Reiner, Cat Cora	
1,251	February 10, 2011	Jennifer Beals, Jean-Michel Cousteau	
1,252	February 11, 2011	Jason Biggs, Jennifer Ouellette	
1,253	February 14, 2011	Bob Barker, Melissa Rauch	
1,254	February 15, 2011	William Shatner, Gillian Jacobs	
1,255	February 16, 2011	Joely Fisher	Matt Kirshen
1,256	February 17, 2011	Sarah Chalke	Louie Anderson
1,257	February 18, 2011	DJ Qualls, Lily Tomlin	
1,258	February 21, 2011	Wolf Blitzer, Sara Rue	
1,259	February 22, 2011	John Waters	
1,260	February 23, 2011	Joel McHale	Comedian Greg Warren
1,261	February 24, 2011	Forest Whitaker, Teresa Palmer	
1,262	February 25, 2011	Malin Åkerman, Phil Keoghan	
1,263	February 28, 2011	Isaac Mizrahi, Patton Oswalt; Chris Hardwick drops in for tweetmails and a clip of his and Bridger Winegar's visit to the Dr. Who convention	

=== March ===
No.	Original air date	Guest(s)	Musical/entertainment guest(s)
1,264	March 1, 2011	Carla Gugino, Tom Lennon	
1,265	March 2, 2011	Hugh Laurie, Ariel Tweto	
1,266	March 3, 2011	Neil Patrick Harris	Tomorrows Bad Seeds
1,267	March 4, 2011	Kathy Griffin, Wendy Booker	
1,268	March 7, 2011	Aaron Eckhart, Paula Poundstone	
1,269	March 8, 2011	Topher Grace, Catherine Deneuve	
1,270	March 9, 2011	Trace Adkins, Windell Middlebrooks	
1,271	March 10, 2011	Wanda Sykes, Kevin McKidd	
1,272	March 11, 2011	Amanda Peet, Phil Hanley	
1,273	March 14, 2011	Lewis Black	Stackridge
1,274	March 15, 2011	Martha Stewart	
1,275	March 16, 2011	Seth Rogen, Brie Larson	
1,276	March 28, 2011	Bob Geldof	Far East Movement
1,277	March 29, 2011	Larry King, Dr. Sanjay Gupta	
1,278	March 30, 2011	Matthew McConaughey, Amy Smart	
1,279	March 31, 2011	Julie Chen, Jeffrey Tambor	

=== April ===
No.	Original air date	Guest(s)	Musical/entertainment guest(s)
1,280	April 1, 2011	Paul Giamatti, Casey Wilson	
1,281	April 4, 2011	D. L. Hughley, Michelle Monaghan	
1,282	April 5, 2011	Jerry O'Connell, Sophia Bush	
1,283	April 6, 2011	Elliot Page	Marc Maron
1,284	April 7, 2011	Helen Hunt, Billy Gardell	
1,285	April 8, 2011	Zooey Deschanel, Chris Hardwick	
1,286	April 11, 2011	Isabella Rossellini, Casey Wilson	
1,287	April 12, 2011	Wynonna Judd, Ariel Tweto	
1,288	April 13, 2011	Ashley Judd, Evan Michelson	Maz Jobrani
1,289	April 14, 2011	Kristen Bell, Jason Aldean	
1,290	April 15, 2011	Robin Wright, Dan Riskin	
1,291	April 18, 2011	Tina Fey, Joe DeVito	Everest
1,292	April 19, 2011	Kathy Griffin, Derrick Pitts	
1,293	April 20, 2011	Michael Clarke Duncan, Lena Headey	
1,294	April 21, 2011	Alfred Molina	Joe DeVito
1,295	April 22, 2011	Diane Lane, Karen Gillan	
1,296	April 28, 2011	Tom Selleck, Odette Annable	
1,297	April 29, 2011	Bob Saget	Sharon Jones & the Dap-Kings

=== May ===
No.	Original air date	Guest(s)	Musical/entertainment guest(s)
1,298	May 2, 2011	Mindy Kaling, Matt Lucas	
1,299	May 3, 2011	Geoffrey Rush	OK Go
1,300	May 4, 2011	John Waters, Pauley Perrette	
1,301	May 5, 2011	Juliette Lewis, Phil Rosenthal	
1,302	May 6, 2011	Will Ferrell	Reese Waters
1,303	May 9, 2011	Jeff Goldblum, Sarah Chalke	
1,304	May 10, 2011	Kenneth Branagh, Edward Conlon	
1,305	May 11, 2011	Tim Meadows, Colin Hay	
1,306	May 12, 2011	Mary Lynn Rajskub, Lawrence Block	Tim Minchin
1,307	May 13, 2011	Paul Reiser, Melissa McCarthy	
1,308	May 16, 2011	Simon Helberg, Sidekick/gay skeleton robot Geoff Peterson	
1,309	May 17, 2011	Patton Oswalt; Betty White drops in for a comedy bit	
1,310	May 18, 2011	Julie Andrews brings a special set of pajamas for Craig to wear during their chat	Little Big Town perform the title track from their album The Reason Why
1,311	May 19, 2011	Tony Shalhoub, Sloane Crosley; Skeleton robot Geoff Peterson, ad lib voiced by Josh Robert Thompson, tells about a few places he has, earning a permanent place at TLLS.	
1,312	May 20, 2011	Carrie Fisher, Edward Conlon	
1,313	May 23, 2011	Jack Black, Quinton Jackson	
1,314	May 24, 2011	Courteney Cox, Carrot Top	Comedian Carrot Top
1,315	May 25, 2011	Norm Macdonald, Julie McCarthy	Oh Land performs "Sun(sic) of a Gun" from Oh Land
1,316	May 26, 2011	Seth Green; Magician Lance Burton	
1,317	May 27, 2011	Drew Carey, Rutina Wesley	Electric Barbarellas perform "Without You" from Strange World
1,318	May 30, 2011	Adam Goldberg, Lucy Punch	
1,319	May 31, 2011	Ray Romano, Dr. Lisa Masterson from The Doctors	

=== June ===
No.	Original air date	Guest(s)	Musical/entertainment guest(s)
1,320	June 1, 2011	David Beckham, Shohreh Aghdashloo	
1,321	June 2, 2011	Dick Van Dyke, Kristin Gore	
1,322	June 3, 2011	Carla Gugino, Rebel Wilson	
1,323	June 6, 2011	Don Cheadle, Brooklyn Decker	
1,324	June 7, 2011	Howie Mandel, Wendy Booker	The Goldberg Sisters
1,325	June 8, 2011	Heather Graham, Chris Gorham	
1,326	June 9, 2011	Morgan Freeman, Carson Kressley	
1,327	June 10, 2011	Kevin Bacon, Wendy Williams	
1,328	June 27, 2011	Dennis Miller, Melissa Joan Hart	
1,329	June 28, 2011	Paris Hilton, Neil Gaiman	
1,330	June 29, 2011	Mary-Louise Parker	Dom Irrera
1,331	June 30, 2011	Henry Winkler, Mike Massimino	

=== July ===
No.	Original air date	Guest(s)	Musical/entertainment guest(s)
1,332	July 1, 2011	Cedric the Entertainer, Moon Bloodgood	
1,333	July 5, 2011	Steven Wright, Ellie Kemper, Adam Savage	
1,334	July 6, 2011	Rosie Perez	
1,335	July 7, 2011	Thomas Lennon, Tatum O'Neal	
1,336	July 8, 2011	Larry King	Ziggy Marley
1,337	July 11, 2011	Elijah Wood, Cat Deeley	
1,338	July 12, 2011	Joely Fisher, Chris Hardwick	Joss Stone
1,339	July 13, 2011	DJ Qualls, Angela Kinsey	
1,340	July 14, 2011	Zooey Deschanel, Jim Cummings	
1,341	July 15, 2011	Tim Daly, Leslie Bibb	Foster the People
1,342	July 18, 2011	Elizabeth Banks, Rich Fulcher	
1,343	July 19, 2011	Eddie Izzard, Hayley Atwell	
1,344	July 20, 2011	Jenna Elfman, Breckin Meyer	Omid Djalili
1,345	July 21, 2011	Amos Lee, Bryan Cranston	
1,346	July 22, 2011	John Goodman, Jayma Mays	
1,347	July 25, 2011	Don Rickles	
1,348	July 26, 2011	William H. Macy, Karen Gillan	
1,349	July 27, 2011	Mary McCormack, David Feherty	
1,350	July 28, 2011	Lisa Kudrow, Ben Mezrich	
1,351	July 29, 2011	Tim Gunn, Matt Smith	Ted Alexandro

=== August ===
No.	Original air date	Guest(s)	Musical/entertainment guest(s)
Le Late Late Show avec Craig Ferguson a Paris
1,352	August 1, 2011	Kristen Bell, Jacques "Arthur" Essebag	
1,353	August 2, 2011	Kristen Bell, Eddie Izzard, Jean Reno	
1,354	August 3, 2011	Jean-Michel Cousteau, Kristen Bell, Jean Reno, Matt Smith	
1,355	August 4, 2011	Kristen Bell, Jean Reno	
1,356	August 5, 2011	Moulin Rouge	
1,357	August 22, 2011	Hugh Laurie, Saffron Burrows	
1,358	August 23, 2011	Lewis Black	Amos Lee
1,359	August 24, 2011	Regis Philbin	Marina Franklin
1,360	August 25, 2011	Kal Penn, Alice Eve	
1,361	August 26, 2011	Shirley Manson, Tory Belleci	
1,362	August 29, 2011	William Shatner, Bianca Kajlich	
1,363	August 30, 2011	Chi McBride, Ariel Tweto	
1,364	August 31, 2011	Leslie Bibb	Louie Anderson

=== September ===
No.	Original air date	Guest(s)	Musical/entertainment guest(s)
1,365	September 1, 2011	Kathy Griffin, Lynette Rice	Lenka
1,366	September 2, 2011	Lindsay Sloane, Peter Krause	
1,367	September 5, 2011	Julie Chen, Annie Duke	
1,368	September 6, 2011	Lisa Kudrow, Richard Engel	
1,369	September 7, 2011	James Marsden, Wolfgang Puck	
1,370	September 8, 2011	Tim Meadows, Bill Bailey	
1,371	September 9, 2011	Alfred Molina, Brie Larson	
1,372	September 13, 2011	Lauren Graham	
1,373	September 14, 2011	Danny DeVito, Olivia Munn	Moulin Rouge
1,374	September 15, 2011	Sigourney Weaver, Ted Alexandro	
1,375	September 16, 2011	James Woods	
1,376	September 19, 2011	Keith Olbermann, Kelly Macdonald	
1,377	September 20, 2011	Harry Connick Jr., Kathryn Hahn	
1,378	September 21, 2011	James Spader, Juno Temple	
1,379	September 22, 2011	Chris Hardwick, Billy Gardell	
1,380	September 23, 2011	Gerard Butler, Kat Dennings	
1,381	September 26, 2011	Jonah Hill	Chris Young
1,382	September 27, 2011	Mary Lynn Rajskub, Jackie Collins	Trombone Shorty
1,383	September 28, 2011	Rashida Jones, Jonathan Ames	
1,384	September 29, 2011	Carson Kressley, Michelle Monaghan	
1,385	September 30, 2011	Seth Rogen, Judy Greer	

=== October ===
No.	Original air date	Guest(s)	Musical/entertainment guest(s)
1,386	October 3, 2011	Lily Tomlin, Ioan Gruffudd	
1,387	October 4, 2011	Jessica Lange, Jacques Steinberg	
1,388	October 5, 2011	Joel McHale, Elizabeth Cook	
1,389	October 6, 2011	Evangeline Lilly, Dan Riskin	
1,390	October 7, 2011	Jason Schwartzman, Eliza Coupe	
1,391	October 10, 2011	Claire Danes	
1,392	October 11, 2011	Steven Wright, Monica Potter	
1,393	October 12, 2011	Jim Parsons	Cake
1,394	October 13, 2011	Kathy Bates, Anthony Head	
1,395	October 14, 2011	Liza Minnelli, Adam Pally	
1,396	October 17, 2011	Matt Smith, Joel Schumacher	
1,397	October 18, 2011	Carey Mulligan, Paula Poundstone	
1,398	October 19, 2011	Carla Gugino, Joe Matarese	
1,399	October 20, 2011	Tom Lennon, Sarah Paulson	
1,400	October 21, 2011	Jeffrey Tambor, Laura Jansen	Cory Kahaney
1,401	October 27, 2011	Kunal Nayyar	
1,402	October 28, 2011	Olivia Munn, Judy Gold	Duran Duran
1,403	October 31, 2011	Zooey Deschanel, Neil Gaiman	Amanda Palmer

=== November ===
No.	Original air date	Guest(s)	Musical/entertainment guest(s)
1,404	November 1, 2011	Maria Bello, Jake Johnson	
1,405	November 2, 2011	Ted Danson, Bitsie Tulloch	
1,406	November 3, 2011	Alan Alda, Ariel Tweto	
1,407	November 4, 2011	Neil Patrick Harris	Imelda May
1,408	November 7, 2011	Jeffrey Dean Morgan featuring Alfred Molina as Geoff Peterson	The Grascals
1,409	November 8, 2011	Jennifer Tilly, Lawrence Block featuring Dominic Monaghan as Geoff Peterson	
1,410	November 9, 2011	Ellen Barkin, Dave Attell featuring Thomas Lennon as Geoff Peterson	
1,411	November 10, 2011	Molly Shannon, Michael K. Williams featuring Larry King as Geoff Peterson	
1,412	November 11, 2011	Drew Carey, Linda Cunningham featuring Louie Anderson as Geoff Peterson	
1,413	November 14, 2011	Poppy Montgomery, Charlie Higson featuring Lauren Graham as Geoff Peterson	
1,414	November 15, 2011	Ewan McGregor featuring Paula Poundstone as Geoff Peterson	
1,415	November 16, 2011	Michael Ian Black, Alex Kingston featuring Angela Kinsey as Geoff Peterson	
1,416	November 17, 2011	Robin Williams featuring Jason Schwartzman as Geoff Peterson	
1,417	November 18, 2011	Don Rickles, Beth Behrs featuring Shadoe Stevens as Geoff Peterson	
1,418	November 21, 2011	Robin Williams, Johnny Galecki	
1,419	November 22, 2011	Jason Segel, Eliza Coupe	
1,420	November 23, 2011	Ty Burrell, Wilford Brimley	
1,421	November 28, 2011	Aisha Tyler featuring Thomas Lennon as Geoff Peterson	Justin Moore
1,422	November 29, 2011	Margaret Cho, Michael Connelly featuring Thomas Lennon as Geoff Peterson	
1,423	November 30, 2011	David Sedaris, Jeff Cesario featuring Thomas Lennon as Geoff Peterson	

=== December ===
No.	Original air date	Guest(s)	Musical/entertainment guest(s)
1,424	December 1, 2011	Kristin Chenoweth, Ken Tucker	
1,425	December 2, 2011	Ana Gasteyer, Beth Behrs	
1,426	December 5, 2011	Justin Long, Noomi Rapace	
1,427	December 6, 2011	Valerie Bertinelli	Henry Cho
1,428	December 7, 2011	Trace Adkins	Michael Palascak
1,429	December 8, 2011	Pierce Brosnan, Laura Lippman	
1,430	December 9, 2011	Richard Lewis	Needtobreathe
1,431	December 12, 2011	DJ Qualls, Cat Cora	
1,432	December 13, 2011	Ben Kingsley, Morena Baccarin	
1,433	December 14, 2011	Kenneth Branagh, Patton Oswalt	
1,434	December 15, 2011	Sean Hayes, John Hodgman	
1,435	December 16, 2011	Mindy Kaling, Nick Griffin	
1,436	December 19, 2011	Regis Philbin featuring Thomas Lennon as Geoff Peterson	Goo Goo Dolls
1,437	December 20, 2011	Robin Wright, Parker Young	
1,438	December 21, 2011	Jason Lee, Felicity Jones	Black Dub
1,439	December 22, 2011	Kyra Sedgwick	Frankie Ballard
1,440	December 23, 2011	Jason Segel, Johnny Galecki	

== 2012 ==
=== January ===
No.	Original air date	Guest(s)	Musical/entertainment guest(s)
8-85	January 2, 2012	Tim Meadows	Eliza Doolittle, Myq Kaplan
8-86	January 3, 2012	Carrie Fisher, Matthew Gray Gubler	
8-87	January 4, 2012	RZA, Melissa Rauch	
8-88	January 5, 2012	Tom Selleck, Daniela Ruah	
8-89	January 6, 2012	Michael Clarke Duncan, Laura Prepon	
8-90	January 9, 2012	Howie Mandel	Randy Houser
8-91	January 10, 2012	Isaac Mizrahi, Sophia Bush	
8-92	January 11, 2012	Adam Goldberg, Mercedes Masohn	
8-93	January 12, 2012	Hugh Laurie	
8-94	January 13, 2012	Kristen Bell	Louie Anderson
8-95	January 16, 2012	Lucy Liu, Kevin Sorbo	
8-96	January 17, 2012	Colin Firth, Lynette Rice	
8-97	January 18, 2012	David Duchovny, Dr. Sanjay Gupta	
8-98	January 19, 2012	Steven Wright, Sara Paxton	
8-99	January 20, 2012	Larry the Cable Guy	3 Doors Down
8-100	January 30, 2012	Don Cheadle, Andrea Riseborough	
8-101	January 31, 2012	Ringo Starr	

=== February ===
No.	Original air date	Guest(s)	Musical/entertainment guest(s)
8-102	February 1, 2012	William Shatner, Kathryn Hahn	
8-103	February 2, 2012	Daniel Radcliffe	Mark Forward
8-104	February 3, 2012	Rachel Bilson, Jonathan Ames	
8-105	February 6, 2012	Mark Harmon, Martha Plimpton	
8-106	February 7, 2012	Kenneth Branagh	Chad Daniels
8-107	February 8, 2012	Christina Applegate, Brad Goreski	
8-108	February 9, 2012	Lisa Kudrow	"Weird Al" Yankovic
8-109	February 10, 2012	Chelsea Handler, Dan Riskin	
8-110	February 13, 2012	Carol Burnett, Phil Keoghan	
8-111	February 14, 2012	Joss Stone	Joss Stone, Dave Stewart
8-112	February 15, 2012	Jon Cryer, Morena Baccarin	
8-113	February 16, 2012	Jeffrey Tambor, Amy Smart	
8-114	February 17, 2012	Simon Helberg	Margaret Cho
8-115	February 20, 2012	Jayma Mays, Jean-Michel Cousteau	
8-116	February 21, 2012	Bill Maher, Eloise Mumford	
8-117	February 22, 2012	Carson Kressley	Ramin Nazer
8-118	February 23, 2012	Malin Åkerman, Jon Ronson	
8-119	February 24, 2012	John Waters, Jennifer Carpenter	
8-120	February 27, 2012	Eric Idle, Sarah Paulson	
8-121	February 28, 2012	Dr. Mehmet Oz, Carrie Keagan	
8-122	February 29, 2012	Tom Lennon, Phil Plait	

=== March ===
No.	Original air date	Guest(s)	Musical/entertainment guest(s)
8-123	March 1, 2012	Henry Winkler, Jay Baruchel	
8-124	March 2, 2012	Dennis Miller	The Light Brigade
8-125	March 5, 2012	Courteney Cox	Louie Anderson
8-126	March 6, 2012	Joel McHale, Dan Boulger	
8-127	March 7, 2012	Susan Sarandon	Rondell Sheridan
8-128	March 8, 2012	Raquel Welch, Carl Edwards	
8-129	March 9, 2012	Kristin Davis, Chris O'Dowd	
8-130	March 12, 2012	Leslie Bibb, David Milch	
8-131	March 13, 2012	Jason Segel, Jennette McCurdy	
8-132	March 14, 2012	Regis Philbin	
8-133	March 19, 2012	Anne Rice, Geoff Tate	
8-134	March 20, 2012	Kathy Bates, Brad Goreski	
8-135	March 21, 2012	Elizabeth Banks	

=== April ===
No.	Original air date	Guest(s)	Musical/entertainment guest(s)
8-136	April 2, 2012	Julie Chen, Pau Gasol	
8-137	April 3, 2012	Ted Danson, Hannah Simone	
8-138	April 4, 2012	Jeffrey Tambor	The Lumineers
8-139	April 5, 2012	Jeffrey Dean Morgan, Bryan Miller	
8-140	April 6, 2012	Laura Linney, Grant Imahara	
8-141	April 9, 2012	Billy Gardell, Ian Gomez	
8-142	April 10, 2012	Guy Pearce, Jessica St. Clair	
8-143	April 11, 2012	Adam Goldberg, Robbie Montgomery	
8-144	April 12, 2012	Judd Apatow, Katherine Jenkins	
8-145	April 13, 2012	Sean Hayes, Lena Dunham	
8-146	April 16, 2012	Kathy Griffin	M. Ward
8-147	April 17, 2012	Kevin Kline, Alice Eve	
8-148	April 18, 2012	Michael Sheen, Michael Ian Black	
8-149	April 19, 2012	Kelly Preston, Joel Stein	
8-150	April 20, 2012	Emily Deschanel, Jerry Ferrara	
8-151	April 26, 2012	Toni Collette, Mike Massimino	
8-152	April 27, 2012	Patton Oswalt, Phoebe Tonkin	
8-153	April 30, 2012	Jim Gaffigan, Cat Cora	

=== May ===
No.	Original air date	Guest(s)	Musical/entertainment guest(s)
8-154	May 1, 2012	Jesse Tyler Ferguson, Lennon Parham	
8-155	May 2, 2012	Anjelica Huston, Reno Wilson	
8-156	May 3, 2012	Julie Andrews, Michael Emerson	
8-157	May 4, 2012	Zooey Deschanel, Patrick Warburton	
8-158	May 7, 2012	Poppy Montgomery, Steve Guttenberg	
8-159	May 8, 2012	Steven Tyler, Jaime King	
8-160	May 9, 2012	Jenna Fischer, Danny Huston	
8-161	May 10, 2012	Christiane Amanpour, Anna Kendrick	
8-162	May 11, 2012	Larry King, Anna Chlumsky	
The Late Late Show with Craig Ferguson in Scotland
8-163	May 14, 2012	Mila Kunis, Michael Clarke Duncan, Rashida Jones, David Sedaris, Ariel Tweto	The Imagineers
8-164	May 15, 2012	Alex Salmond, Mila Kunis, Rashida Jones	The Imagineers
8-165	May 16, 2012	Michael Clarke Duncan, Mila Kunis	The Imagineers
8-166	May 17, 2012	Mila Kunis, Ariel Tweto, Fred MacAulay	The Imagineers
8-167	May 18, 2012	David Sedaris, Mila Kunis, Ariel Tweto, Rashida Jones	The Imagineers
8-168	May 21, 2012	Jeffrey Dean Morgan, Steven Wright	
8-169	May 22, 2012	Billy Bob Thornton, Sonya Walger	
8-170	May 23, 2012	Jennifer Love Hewitt, Rutina Wesley	
8-171	May 24, 2012	Alfred Molina	Sara Watkins
8-172	May 25, 2012	Jason Alexander, Angela Kinsey	
8-173	May 28, 2012	Benjamin McKenzie, Shohreh Aghdashloo	
8-174	May 29, 2012	DJ Qualls, Wolfgang Puck	
8-175	May 30, 2012	Howie Mandel, Sutton Foster	
8-176	May 31, 2012	Carrie Fisher, Tony Hale	

=== June ===
No.	Original air date	Guest(s)	Musical/entertainment guest(s)
8-177	June 1, 2012	Jeff Garlin, Sonya Walger	
8-178	June 11, 2012	Jason Schwartzman	Rory Scovel
8-179	June 12, 2012	Andy García, Cody Horn	
8-180	June 13, 2012	Elliot Page, Lee Brice	
8-181	June 14, 2012	Don Rickles, Max Greenfield	
8-182	June 15, 2012	Jenna Elfman	The Imagineers
8-183	June 18, 2012	Alex Salmond, Kelly Macdonald, Kevin McKidd	
8-184	June 19, 2012	Steve Carell, Don Winslow	
8-185	June 20, 2012	Morgan Freeman, Ben Dukes	
8-186	June 21, 2012	Jeff Daniels, John Irving	
8-187	June 22, 2012	Mark Wahlberg, Sloane Crosley	
8-188	June 25, 2012	Elijah Wood, Kathleen Rose Perkins	
8-189	June 26, 2012	William Shatner, Breckin Meyer	
8-190	June 27, 2012	Lisa Kudrow, Harvey Weinstein	
8-191	June 28, 2012	Denis Leary, Brandi Carlile	
8-192	June 29, 2012	Tyler Perry	Matt Kirshen

=== July ===
No.	Original air date	Guest(s)	Musical/entertainment guest(s)
8-193	July 16, 2012	Julie Chen, Chris Messina	
8-194	July 17, 2012	Cedric the Entertainer, Ari Graynor	
8-195	July 18, 2012	Ray Romano	Trampled by Turtles
8-196	July 19, 2012	Kenneth Branagh	Ted Alexandro
8-197	July 20, 2012	Jason Biggs, Jordana Brewster	Brian Scolaro
8-198	July 23, 2012	George Hamilton, Julie Gonzalo	
8-199	July 24, 2012	Minnie Driver, Colin Mochrie	
8-200	July 25, 2012	Matthew McConaughey	
8-201	July 26, 2012	Emile Hirsch, Ariel Tweto	
8-202	July 27, 2012	Vince Vaughn	
8-203	July 30, 2012	Emma Roberts, Paula Poundstone	
8-204	July 31, 2012	Rosie Perez	

=== August ===
No.	Original air date	Guest(s)	Musical/entertainment guest(s)
1,560	August 1, 2012	Selma Blair, Adam Savage	
1,561	August 2, 2012	Rashida Jones, Julie Delpy	
1,562	August 3, 2012	Edward Norton, Malin Åkerman	
1,563	August 6, 2012	Stephen King, Dave Barry	Rock Bottom Remainders
1,564	August 7, 2012	Rachael Ray	The Imagineers
1,565	August 8, 2012	Chris Hardwick, Carla Gugino	
1,566	August 27, 2012	Kristen Bell	
1,567	August 28, 2012	Larry King	Michelle Buteau
1,568	August 29, 2012	Jeffrey Dean Morgan, Fiona Gubelmann	Nick Griffin
1,569	August 30, 2012	Lisa Kudrow, Marc Maron	
1,570	August 31, 2012	Seth Green, Sutton Foster	Sutton Foster

=== September ===
No.	Original release date	Guest(s)	Musical/entertainment guest(s)
1,571	September 4, 2012	Kathy Griffin	N/A
1,572	September 5, 2012	Jeremy Irons, Monica Potter	N/A
1,573	September 6, 2012	Angela Kinsey, David Simon	The Heavy
1,574	September 7, 2012	Kunal Nayyar, Lauren Miller, Amber Earnest	N/A
1,575	September 10, 2012	Ben Stein, Rhona Mitra	Brooks McBeth
1,576	September 11, 2012	Adam Goldberg, Alison Becker	N/A
1,577	September 12, 2012	Heather Graham, Joel Stein	N/A
1,578	September 13, 2012	Katey Sagal, Michael J. Massimino	N/A
1,579	September 14, 2012	Tom Lennon, Brit Marling	N/A
1,580	September 17, 2012	Julie Chen, Warren Sapp	Lianne La Havas
1,581	September 18, 2012	John Goodman, Arjay Smith	Melissa Etheridge
1,582	September 19, 2012	Sophia Bush	N/A
1,583	September 20, 2012	Nikki Reed, Mitch Albom	N/A
1,584	September 21, 2012	Neil Patrick Harris	Gerry Dee
1,585	September 24, 2012	Dennis Quaid, Ellie Kemper	N/A
1,586	September 25, 2012	Tom Selleck, June Diane Raphael	N/A
1,587	September 26, 2012	Jim Parsons	Dispatch
1,588	September 27, 2012	Anne Heche, Jennifer Carpenter	N/A
1,589	September 28, 2012	Michael C. Hall, Martha Plimpton	N/A

=== October ===
No.	Original release date	Guest(s)	Musical/entertainment guest(s)
1,590	October 1, 2012	Jeff Garlin, Ethan Hawke	Lynyrd Skynyrd
1,591	October 2, 2012	Mindy Kaling	Carrot Top
1,592	October 3, 2012	Keanu Reeves, Dan Riskin	N/A
1,593	October 4, 2012	Roseanne Barr, Keke Palmer	N/A
1,594	October 5, 2012	Sanjay Gupta, Ginnifer Goodwin	N/A
1,595	October 15, 2012	Jeff Goldblum, Sarah Paulson	N/A
1,596	October 16, 2012	Lauren Graham, James Patterson	Michael Kiwanuka
1,597	October 17, 2012	Carson Kressley, Kay Adams	N/A
1,598	October 18, 2012	Kelsey Grammer, Casey Wilson	Ben Hague
1,599	October 19, 2012	Chelsea Handler, Nina Conti	Allen Stone
1,600	October 22, 2012	Bryan Cranston, Lisa Masterson	N/A
1,601	October 23, 2012	Phil McGraw, Hana Mae Lee	N/A
1,602	October 24, 2012	Susan Sarandon, David Benioff	Thomas Dale
1,603	October 25, 2012	Michael Chiklis, Maggie Grace	N/A
1,604	October 26, 2012	Amanda Peet, John Cho	N/A
1,605	October 29, 2012	Tom Hanks	Phil Hanley
1,606	October 30, 2012	Jay Leno	Lynyrd Skynyrd
1,607	October 31, 2012	Rashida Jones, David Morrissey	N/A

=== November ===
No.	Original release date	Guest(s)	Musical/entertainment guest(s)
1,608	November 1, 2012	Joel McHale, Alton Brown	N/A
1,609	November 2, 2012	Michael Sheen	Thomas Dale
1,610	November 5, 2012	Tenacious D, Sarah Shahi	N/A
1,611	November 7, 2012	Matthew Perry	RZA
1,612	November 8, 2012	LL Cool J, Naeomie Harris	Sutton Foster
1,613	November 9, 2012	Eric Idle, Emily VanCamp	N/A
1,614	November 12, 2012	DJ Qualls, Nikki Reed, Dave Attell	N/A
1,615	November 13, 2012	Katlin Mastandrea, Toby Keith, J. R. Martinez	N/A
1,616	November 14, 2012	Billy Crystal, Bérénice Marlohe	N/A
1,617	November 15, 2012	Max Greenfield, Lucy Punch	N/A
1,618	November 16, 2012	Richie Sambora, James Spader, Cynthia Littleton	N/A
1,619	November 19, 2012	Regis Philbin, Katie Aselton	N/A
1,620	November 20, 2012	Marion Cotillard, Kevin Pollak	N/A
1,621	November 26, 2012	Lily Tomlin, Matthew Gray Gubler	N/A
1,622	November 27, 2012	James Marsden, Daniela Ruah	Cory Kahaney
1,623	November 28, 2012	Lewis Black, Karen Gillan	LP
1,624	November 29, 2012	Kristin Davis, Nat Faxon	N/A
1,625	November 30, 2012	Tom Hanks, Tim Meadows, Mayim Bialik	N/A

=== December ===
No.	Original release date	Guest(s)	Musical/entertainment guest(s)
1,626	December 3, 2012	Seth MacFarlane, Miranda Kerr	Richie Sambora performs "The Late Late Show Theme" with Ferguson, and "Every Road Leads Home to You" from Aftermath of the Lowdown
1,627	December 4, 2012	Reba McEntire, Keegan-Michael Key	Richie Sambora performs "The Late Late Show Theme", and "Seven Years Gone" from Aftermath of the Lowdown
1,628	December 5, 2012	Cheryl Hines, Peter Sagal	Richie Sambora performs "The Late Late Show Theme" with Larry King
1,629	December 6, 2012	Denis Leary	Richie Sambora performs "The Late Late Show Theme" with Eddie Izzard, and "Wanted Dead or Alive" from the Bon Jovi album Slippery When Wet
1,630	December 7, 2012	Julie Delpy, Lamorne Morris	Richie Sambora performs "The Late Late Show Theme" with Denis Leary, and later, "Sugar Daddy" from Aftermath of the Lowdown with Ferguson singing lead.
1,631	December 10, 2012	Kristen Stewart, Sloane Crosley	N/A
1,632	December 11, 2012	Betty White, Morena Baccarin	Terry Fator (Stand-up routine)
1,633	December 12, 2012	Chris O'Dowd, Beth Behrs	N/A
1,634	December 13, 2012	Howie Mandel, Olivia Williams	N/A
1,635	December 14, 2012	Bradley Cooper, Wolfgang Puck	N/A
1,636	December 17, 2012	Sarah Chalke, Anne Rice	N/A
1,637	December 18, 2012	Don Johnson, Brad Goreski	N/A
1,638	December 19, 2012	Judd Apatow, Joanne Froggatt	N/A
1,639	December 20, 2012	Quentin Tarantino	N/A
1,640	December 21, 2012	Jamie Foxx, Bianca Kajlich	N/A

== 2013 ==
=== January ===
No.	Original release date	Guest(s)	Musical/entertainment guest(s)
1,641	January 7, 2013	Billy Gardell, Krysten Ritter	N/A
1,642	January 8, 2013	Billy Connolly, Meaghan Rath	N/A
1,643	January 9, 2013	Steven Wright, Genesis Rodriguez	N/A
1,644	January 10, 2013	Tim Allen, Margaret Cho	N/A
1,645	January 11, 2013	Julie Chen, Angela Kinsey	N/A
1,646	January 14, 2013	Jenna Elfman, Guillermo del Toro	N/A
1,647	January 15, 2013	Lena Dunham, Bill Pullman	N/A
1,648	January 16, 2013	Don Cheadle, DJ Qualls	N/A
1,649	January 17, 2013	Julia Stiles, Jerry Ferrara	Tom Cotter (Stand-up routine)
1,650	January 18, 2013	Carrie Fisher, Steven Yeun	N/A
1,651	January 28, 2013	Kathy Griffin, Michael Weatherly	Bone Patrol
1,652	January 29, 2013	Simon Helberg, Maria Bamford	Bone Patrol
1,653	January 30, 2013	Dominic Monaghan, Ellie Kemper	Bone Patrol
1,654	January 31, 2013	Rashida Jones, Julie Gonzalo	Bone Patrol

=== February ===
No.	Original release date	Guest(s)	Musical/entertainment guest(s)
1,655	February 1, 2013	Joe Theismann, Ariel Tweto	Bone Patrol
1,656	February 3, 2013	The Craig Ferguson Super Bowl Special: Drew Brees, Steve Carell, Nikki Reed, Channing Tatum, Julie Chen, Neil Patrick Harris	Bone Patrol
1,657	February 4, 2013	Zooey Deschanel, Adhir Kalyan	N/A
1,658	February 5, 2013	David Boreanaz, Alison Becker	N/A
1,659	February 6, 2013	Emmy Rossum, Jon Ronson	N/A
1,660	February 7, 2013	Amanda Peet, Paul Williams	N/A
1,661	February 8, 2013	Alfred Molina	Ophira Eisenberg (Stand-up routine)
1,662	February 11, 2013	Julie Andrews, Grace Park	N/A
1,663	February 12, 2013	Ted Danson, Teresa Palmer	N/A
1,664	February 13, 2013	Russell Brand, Allison Williams	N/A
1,665	February 14, 2013	George Lopez, Sutton Foster	N/A
1,666	February 15, 2013	Jane Lynch, Mario Lopez	N/A
1,667	February 18, 2013	Jacki Weaver, Jim Gaffigan	Nicola Benedetti ("Romance: Andante")
1,668	February 19, 2013	Jon Cryer, Melissa Benoist	N/A
1,669	February 20, 2013	Lisa Kudrow, Bonnie Raitt	N/A
1,670	February 21, 2013	Kunal Nayyar, Molly Shannon	N/A
1,671	February 22, 2013	William Shatner, Alona Tal	N/A
1,672	February 25, 2013	Keith Olbermann, Coco Rocha	N/A
1,673	February 26, 2013	Sharon Osbourne, Matthew Lillard	N/A
1,674	February 27, 2013	Mike Tyson, Tom Lennon	N/A
1,675	February 28, 2013	David Duchovny, Ashley Madekwe	N/A

=== March ===
No.	Original release date	Guest(s)	Musical/entertainment guest(s)
1,676	March 1, 2013	Trace Adkins, Naya Rivera	N/A
1,677	March 4, 2013	Jeffrey Dean Morgan, Katheryn Winnick	N/A
1,678	March 5, 2013	Larry King, Abbie Cornish	N/A
1,679	March 6, 2013	Christina Hendricks, Jackie Collins	N/A
1,680	March 7, 2013	Zach Braff, Gillian Jacobs	N/A
1,681	March 8, 2013	Chi McBride, Laurie Holden	N/A
1,682	March 11, 2013	George Hamilton, Jessica Lucas	N/A
1,683	March 12, 2013	Minnie Driver, Ben Schwartz	N/A
1,684	March 13, 2013	Olivia Wilde, Windell Middlebrooks	N/A
1,685	March 14, 2013	Monica Potter, Jim Rome	N/A
1,686	March 15, 2013	Megan Mullally, Alison Brie	N/A
1,687	March 18, 2013	Jenna-Louise Coleman, Seth Green	N/A
1,688	March 19, 2013	Michelle Monaghan, John Green	N/A
1,689	March 20, 2013	Aaron Eckhart, Kellie Pickler	N/A
1,690	March 25, 2013	Morgan Freeman, Vera Farmiga	N/A
1,691	March 26, 2013	Sarah Chalke, Lawrence Block	N/A
1,692	March 27, 2013	Don Rickles, Radha Mitchell	N/A

=== April ===
No.	Original release date	Guest(s)	Musical/entertainment guest(s)
1,693	April 8, 2013	Max Greenfield, Debbie Reynolds	N/A
1,694	April 9, 2013	Drew Carey, Jane Levy	N/A
1,695	April 10, 2013	Julia Louis-Dreyfus	He's My Brother She's My Sister ("Same Old Ground")
1,696	April 11, 2013	Anna Chlumsky, Carl Reiner	N/A
1,697	April 12, 2013	Jason Biggs, Keke Palmer	N/A
1,698	April 15, 2013	Rob Lowe, Larry King	N/A
Special format episode. Cold open monologue on the Boston bombing. Last-minute guest Larry King discusses news broadcasting on tragic events. Opening credits, comedic monologue, sidekicks Geoff Peterson and Secretariat are omitted.
1,699	April 16, 2013	Selma Blair, Nathan Fielder	N/A
1,700	April 17, 2013	Brad Goreski, Melissa Rauch	N/A
1,701	April 18, 2013	Ginnifer Goodwin, Salman Rushdie	N/A
1,702	April 19, 2013	Harrison Ford, Ariel Tweto	N/A
1,703	April 22, 2013	Kat Dennings, Philip Kerr	N/A
1,704	April 23, 2013	Kevin Bacon, Rebecca Hall	N/A
1,705	April 24, 2013	Rainn Wilson, Karen Gillan	N/A
1,706	April 25, 2013	Zac Efron, Anna Quindlen	N/A
1,707	April 26, 2013	Robin Wright	Myq Kaplan (Stand-up routine)
1,708	April 29, 2013	Mary McCormack, Jim O'Heir	N/A
1,709	April 30, 2013	Larry the Cable Guy, Abigail Spencer	N/A

=== May ===
No.	Original release date	Guest(s)	Musical/entertainment guest(s)
1,710	May 1, 2013	Michael Ian Black, Lena Headey	N/A
1,711	May 2, 2013	Pierce Brosnan	Tone Bell (Stand-up routine)
1,712	May 3, 2013	Angela Kinsey, Simon Amstell	N/A
1,713	May 6, 2013	Isla Fisher, Jim Rash	N/A
1,714	May 7, 2013	Ryan Seacrest, Andrea Osvárt	N/A
1,715	May 8, 2013	Lauren Graham	Ben Dukes ("Old Fixer Upper")
1,716	May 9, 2013	Bob Saget, Sarah Hyland	N/A
1,717	May 10, 2013	Tom Lennon, Cat Deeley	N/A
1,718	May 13, 2013	John Cho, Sara Rue	N/A
1,719	May 14, 2013	Ray Liotta	Pistol Annies ("Unhappily Married"), DeAnne Smith (Stand-up routine)
1,720	May 15, 2013	Ice-T, Paula Poundstone	N/A
1,721	May 16, 2013	Paul Reiser, Yunjin Kim	N/A
1,722	May 17, 2013	William Shatner, Natalie Dormer	N/A
1,723	May 20, 2013	Heather Graham, David Benioff	N/A
1,724	May 21, 2013	Zach Galifianakis, Andrea Riseborough	N/A
1,725	May 22, 2013	Stephen Fry	N/A
1,726	May 27, 2013	Ben Kingsley, Alia Shawkat	N/A
1,727	May 28, 2013	Elliot Page, George Stroumboulopoulos	N/A
1,728	May 29, 2013	Howie Mandel, Brit Marling	N/A
1,729	May 30, 2013	Jeff Garlin, Anne Heche	N/A
1,730	May 31, 2013	Kathy Griffin	Bad Rabbits ("Can't Fool Me")

=== June ===
No.	Original release date	Guest(s)	Musical/entertainment guest(s)
1,731	June 3, 2013	Steven Tyler, Olga Kurylenko	N/A
1,732	June 4, 2013	Bill Maher, Cat Cora	N/A
1,733	June 5, 2013	Dr. Sanjay Gupta, Gretchen Wilson	N/A
1,734	June 6, 2013	Betty White, Sarah Paulson	N/A
1,735	June 7, 2013	Ethan Hawke, Jamie Chung	N/A
1,736	June 10, 2013	Jonah Hill, Tony Kanaan	N/A
1,737	June 11, 2013	Margaret Cho, Hugh Dancy	N/A
1,738	June 12, 2013	Valerie Bertinelli, Adam Ray	N/A
Ferguson does show and tell on his Banff World Television Festival Sir Peter Ustinov Comedy Award.
1,739	June 13, 2013	Seth Rogen, Elisabeth Moss	N/A
1,740	June 14, 2013	Emily Mortimer	Barry Rothbart (Stand-up routine)
1,741	June 17, 2013	Carson Kressley, Rachelle Lefevre	N/A
1,742	June 18, 2013	Angie Harmon, Ben Mezrich	N/A
1,743	June 19, 2013	Rosie Perez	The Rubens ("The Day You Went Away")
1,744	June 20, 2013	Lewis Black	Matt Morales (Stand-up Routine)
1,745	June 21, 2013	Maggie Gyllenhaal, Matt Goldich	N/A
1,746	June 24, 2013	Toni Collette, Dylan Moran	N/A
1,747	June 25, 2013	Breckin Meyer, Wendie Malick	N/A
1,748	June 26, 2013	Sandra Bullock, Jim McDonald	N/A
1,749	June 27, 2013	Channing Tatum, Marc Maron	N/A
1,750	June 28, 2013	Tenacious D, Moon Bloodgood	N/A

=== July ===
No.	Original release date	Guest(s)	Musical/entertainment guest(s)
1,751	July 8, 2013	Heather Locklear	Louie Anderson (stand-up routine)
1,752	July 9, 2013	Morgan Freeman	Cathy Ladman (stand-up routine)
1,753	July 10, 2013	Cedric the Entertainer, Jess Weixler	N/A
1,754	July 11, 2013	Maria Bello, Scott Adsit	N/A
1,755	July 12, 2013	Jeff Daniels	Jeff Daniels ("Have a Good Life Then Die"), Sarah Tiana (Stand-up routine)
1,756	July 15, 2013	Julie Chen	Michael Palascak (Stand-up routine)
1,757	July 16, 2013	Jon Hamm, Georgia King	N/A
1,758	July 17, 2013	Anthony Hopkins, Jes Macallan	N/A
1,759	July 18, 2013	Jeffrey Tambor	Cristela Alonzo (Stand-up routine)
1,760	July 19, 2013	Jane Lynch	Goo Goo Dolls ("Come to Me")
1,761	July 22, 2013	Brooke Shields, Sara Bareilles	Sara Bareilles performs "Brave" from The Blessed Unrest
1,762	July 23, 2013	Larry King, Anna Camp	N/A
1,763	July 24, 2013	Matt Smith, Teri Polo	N/A
1,764	July 25, 2013	Bill Hader, Shohreh Aghdashloo	N/A
1,765	July 26, 2013	Lisa Kudrow	Michael McDonald (Stand-up routine)
1,766	July 29, 2013	Courtney Love, Jeff Kurr	N/A
1,767	July 30, 2013	Henry Winkler, Valerie Azlynn	N/A
1,768	July 31, 2013	Jane Leeves, Ahna O'Reilly	Backstreet Boys ("Trust Me")

=== August ===
No.	Original release date	Guest(s)	Musical/entertainment guest(s)
1,769	August 1, 2013	Anthony Edwards	Hugh Moore (Stand-up routine)
1,770	August 2, 2013	Josh Wolf, Georgia King	N/A
1,771	August 5, 2013	Minnie Driver	Minnie Driver ("Close to Me"), Baron Vaughn (Stand-up routine)
1,772	August 6, 2013	Diane Kruger, Tony Hale	N/A
1,773	August 7, 2013	Jeff Goldblum	Jeff Goldblum ("Straight No Chesser")
1,774	August 8, 2013	James Marsden, Meghan Markle	N/A
1,775	August 9, 2013	Keith Olbermann	Esther Povitsky (Stand-up routine)

=== September ===
No.	Original release date	Guest(s)	Musical/entertainment guest(s)
1,776	September 2, 2013	Angela Kinsey, David Feherty	N/A
1,777	September 3, 2013	Jay Leno	Cameron Esposito
1,778	September 4, 2013	Elijah Wood, Brie Larson	N/A
1,779	September 5, 2013	Vin Diesel, Sara Gilbert	N/A
1,780	September 6, 2013	Thomas Lennon	The Wild Feathers ("The Ceiling")
1,781	September 9, 2013	Alice Eve, Shirley Jones	N/A
1,782	September 10, 2013	Anna Faris, Jean-Michel Cousteau	N/A
1,783	September 11, 2013	Max Greenfield, Amy Smart	N/A
1,784	September 12, 2013	Adam Goldberg, Jennifer Carpenter	N/A
1,785	September 13, 2013	Seth Green	Andi Osho (Stand-up routine), Johnnyswim ("Don't Let It Get You Down")
1,786	September 16, 2013	Dianna Agron, Joel Stein	N/A
1,787	September 17, 2013	Queen Latifah, John Lloyd	Laura Mvula ("Green Garden")
1,788	September 18, 2013	Megan Mullally, Tommy Lasorda	N/A
1,789	September 19, 2013	Connie Britton, Aimee Garcia	N/A
1,790	September 20, 2013	Neil Patrick Harris	N/A
1,791	September 23, 2013	Jesse Tyler Ferguson, Taylor Schilling	N/A
1,792	September 24, 2013	Ray Romano, Carl Edwards	N/A
1,793	September 25, 2013	Julia Stiles, Keke Palmer	N/A
1,794	September 26, 2013	Joseph Gordon-Levitt, Maggie Grace	N/A
1,795	September 27, 2013	Julia Louis-Dreyfus	Phil Palisoul (Stand-up routine)
1,796	September 30, 2013	Simon Helberg	The Naked and Famous ("Hearts Like Ours")

=== October ===
No.	Original release date	Guest(s)	Musical/entertainment guest(s)
1,797	October 1, 2013	Patricia Heaton, Dennis Lehane	N/A
1,798	October 2, 2013	Ben Stein, Jayma Mays	N/A
1,799	October 3, 2013	Diane Kruger, Ken Jeong	N/A
1,800	October 4, 2013	Justin Long	Dave Stone (Stand-up Routine)
1,801	October 7, 2013	Zooey Deschanel, Ed Weeks	N/A
1,802	October 8, 2013	Sarah Michelle Gellar, Guillermo Díaz	N/A
1,803	October 9, 2013	Sean Hayes, Tom Cotter	N/A
1,804	October 10, 2013	Steven Wright, Ginnifer Goodwin	N/A
1,805	October 11, 2013	Rashida Jones, Brian McKim	N/A
1,806	October 14, 2013	Malin Akerman, Jo Nesbø	Vintage Trouble ("Pelvis Pusher")
1,807	October 15, 2013	Michael C. Hall, Laura Bell Bundy	N/A
1,808	October 16, 2013	Robin Williams	N/A
1,809	October 17, 2013	Allison Janney, Ben Schwartz	N/A
1,810	October 18, 2013	Rosie Perez	Nick Cobb (Stand-up Routine)
1,811	October 28, 2013	Katey Sagal, Richard Curtis	N/A
1,812	October 29, 2013	Alyssa Milano, Lawrence Block	N/A
1,813	October 30, 2013	Drew Carey, Pamela Silva Conde	N/A
1,814	October 31, 2013	Ben Kingsley, Anne Rice	N/A

=== November ===
No.	Original release date	Guest(s)	Musical/entertainment guest(s)
1,815	November 1, 2013	Geoffrey Rush	Dale Earnhardt Jr. Jr. ("If You Didn't See Me [Then You Weren't On The Dancefloor]")
1,816	November 4, 2013	Lauren Graham, Eugenio Derbez	N/A
1,817	November 5, 2013	Kevin Kline, Jenna Dewan	N/A
1,818	November 6, 2013	Martin Short, Doris Kearns Goodwin	N/A
1,819	November 7, 2013	Kat Dennings, Markus Persson	N/A
1,820	November 8, 2013	Mary Steenburgen, Becca Tobin	N/A
William Shatner appeared in the cold open.
1,821	November 11, 2013	LL Cool J, Carrie Keagan	N/A
1,822	November 12, 2013	Ron Perlman, Lupita Nyong'o	N/A
1,823	November 13, 2013	Kaley Cuoco, Kellie Pickler	N/A
1,824	November 14, 2013	Donald Sutherland, Casey Wilson	N/A
1,825	November 15, 2013	Steven Yeun, Summer Glau	N/A
1,826	November 18, 2013	Kunal Nayyar	N/A
1,827	November 19, 2013	Margaret Cho, Elettra Rossellini Wiedemann	N/A
1,828	November 20, 2013	Nikki Reed	Joe Zimmerman (Stand-up Routine)
1,829	November 21, 2013	David Arquette, Krysten Ritter	N/A
1,830	November 22, 2013	Tim Meadows, Helen Fielding	N/A
1,831	November 25, 2013	Mark Harmon, Wolfgang Puck	N/A
1,832	November 26, 2013	Angela Kinsey	American Authors
William Shatner appeared in the cold open.

=== December ===
No.	Original release date	Guest(s)	Musical/entertainment guest(s)
1,833	December 2, 2013	Betty White, Evangeline Lilly	Josh Blue
1,834	December 3, 2013	Will Arnett, Pau Gasol	N/A
1,835	December 4, 2013	Aisha Tyler, Bruce McCall; Ben Schwartz appears in the cold open	N/A
1,836	December 5, 2013	Anjelica Huston, Jackie Guerrido	N/A
1,837	December 6, 2013	Michael Ian Black, Chris Hardwick, Marc Maron, Zoe Saldaña, Mitch Albom	N/A
1,838	December 9, 2013	Demi Lovato	Louie Anderson
1,839	December 10, 2013	Paul Giamatti, Candice Accola	N/A
1,840	December 11, 2013	Jim Gaffigan, Ariel Tweto	N/A
1,841	December 12, 2013	Jason Schwartzman, Alexis Knapp; William Shatner appears in the cold open	N/A
1,842	December 13, 2013	Michael Sheen; William Shatner appears in the cold open; Ferguson and Josh Robert Thompson do a "Christmas with Kraftwerk" skit	The Lone Bellow play "Green Eyes and a Heart of Gold"
1,843	December 16, 2013	Joe Theismann, Kelly Rowland	N/A
1,844	December 17, 2013	Alyssa Milano, Wilford Brimley	Wilford Brimley With The Jeff Hamilton Trio
1,845	December 18, 2013	Natasha Lyonne, Michael Connelly	Kellie Pickler
1,846	December 19, 2013	Cuba Gooding Jr., Emily Wickersham	N/A
1,847	December 20, 2013	Judd Apatow	Lissie

== 2014 ==
=== January ===
No.	Original release date	Guest(s)	Musical/entertainment guest(s)
1,848	January 6, 2014	Kathy Griffin, Haley Joel Osment	N/A
1,849	January 7, 2014	Don Cheadle, Ivana Miličević	Jake Bugg
1,850	January 8, 2014	Mark Wahlberg, Michaela Conlin	N/A
1,851	January 9, 2014	Patton Oswalt, Hannah New	N/A
1,852	January 10, 2014	Bob Saget, Jane Levy	N/A
1,853	January 13, 2014	Kevin Bacon, Karla Souza	N/A
1,854	January 14, 2014	Aaron Eckhart, Lynette Rice	N/A
1,855	January 15, 2014	Tig Notaro, Julie Delpy	N/A
William Shatner appeared in the cold open.
1,856	January 16, 2014	Kenneth Branagh	Christian Finnegan
1,857	January 17, 2014	Chris Pine, Morena Baccarin	N/A
1,858	January 20, 2014	Denis Leary	N/A
1,859	January 21, 2014	Justin Long, Valerie Azlynn	N/A
1,860	January 22, 2014	Michelle Monaghan, Michael Irvin	N/A
First Sandra the Rhino appearance as voiced by Josh Robert Thompson
1,861	January 23, 2014	Martha Plimpton	Sarah Jarosz
1,862	January 24, 2014	Christina Ricci, Ian Rankin	N/A
1,863	January 30, 2014	Max Greenfield	ZZ Ward
1,864	January 31, 2014	Hayden Panettiere	Brooke Van Poppelen
William Shatner appeared in the cold open.

=== February ===
No.	Original release date	Guest(s)	Musical/entertainment guest(s)
1,865	February 3, 2014	Larry King	Henry Cho
1,866	February 4, 2014	Megan Mullally, J. Maarten Troost	N/A
1,867	February 5, 2014	Jim Parsons	N/A
1,868	February 6, 2014	John Goodman, Imogen Poots	N/A
1,869	February 7, 2014	Tom Lennon, Sarah Paulson	N/A
Yakov Smirnoff appeared in the cold open.
1,870	February 10, 2014	Julie Chen, Bubba Watson	N/A
1,871	February 11, 2014	Jason Alexander, Regina Hall	N/A
1,872	February 12, 2014	Kurt Russell, Aimee Garcia	N/A
1,873	February 13, 2014	Matt LeBlanc, Abbie Cornish	N/A
1,874	February 14, 2014	Elizabeth Banks	Chris Voth
1,875	February 17, 2014	Gary Oldman, Ellie Kemper	Roddy Hart and The Lonesome Fire
1,876	February 18, 2014	Ted Danson, Kristen Schaal	N/A
1,877	February 19, 2014	Kevin Costner, Krystal Keith	Tony Deyo
1,878	February 20, 2014	Joseph Gordon-Levitt, Lisa Vanderpump	N/A
1,879	February 21, 2014	Ken Jeong, Léa Seydoux	N/A
1,880	February 24, 2014	Zooey Deschanel, Vera Farmiga	Roddy Hart and The Lonesome Fire
Julia Mancuso appeared in the cold open.
1,881	February 25, 2014	Ashton Kutcher	Roddy Hart and The Lonesome Fire
1,882	February 26, 2014	Alice Eve, Bojana Novakovic	Roddy Hart and The Lonesome Fire
Taylor Hicks appeared in the cold open.
1,883	February 27, 2014	Julia Stiles, Dave Itzkoff	Roddy Hart and The Lonesome Fire
1,884	February 28, 2014	Sarah Chalke	Roddy Hart and The Lonesome Fire

=== March ===
No.	Original release date	Guest(s)	Musical/entertainment guest(s)
1,885	March 3, 2014	Meredith Vieira, Josh Radnor	N/A
1,886	March 4, 2014	Elijah Wood, Keke Palmer	Glasvegas
1,887	March 5, 2014	Carson Kressley, Lena Headey	Panic! at the Disco
1,888	March 6, 2014	Rosie Perez	Bryan Kellen
1,889	March 7, 2014	Aaron Paul	Andi Osho
1,890	March 10, 2014	Emily Mortimer, Darrin Rose	The Alternate Routes
1,891	March 11, 2014	Jeff Goldblum, Lauren Cohan	N/A
1,892	March 12, 2014	Ricky Gervais, Lauren Cohan	N/A
1,893	March 13, 2014	Kristen Bell, Michael McMillian	N/A
1,894	March 14, 2014	Amy Smart, Denise Mina	N/A
1,895	March 17, 2014	Jane Lynch, Salman Rushdie	N/A
Drew Carey appears in cold open
1,896	March 18, 2014	Lewis Black, Dawn Olivieri	N/A
1,897	March 19, 2014	Uma Thurman, DJ Qualls	N/A
1,898	March 24, 2014	Betty White, Brett Dalton	N/A
1,899	March 25, 2014	Howie Mandel, Ginger Gonzaga	The Belle Brigade
1,900	March 26, 2014	Scarlett Johansson	Maz Jobrani
1,901	March 31, 2014	Carl Reiner, Connie Schultz	Joan Jett & The Blackhearts
As part of an April Fool's Day staff swap with The Price Is Right, Drew Carey hosted with four sidekicks -- George Gray, Rachel Reynolds, Amber Lancaster and Manuela Arbeláez. Ferguson, Stevens, and "Secretariat" were on Price hours later.

=== April ===
No.	Original release date	Guest(s)	Musical/entertainment guest(s)
1,902	April 7, 2014	Cat Deeley, Gina Carano	N/A
1,903	April 8, 2014	Jon Hamm, Pam Dawber	N/A
1,904	April 9, 2014	Sharon Osbourne, Tony Kanaan	N/A
1,905	April 10, 2014	Morgan Freeman	Adam Ray
1,906	April 11, 2014	Wanda Sykes, Malin Akerman	N/A
1,907	April 14, 2014	Dominic Monaghan, Brooklyn Decker	N/A
1,908	April 15, 2014	Wendie Malick, Jim Rash	N/A
1,909	April 16, 2014	Kunal Nayyar	Tom Segura
1,910	April 17, 2014	Kevin Bacon	Andy Hendrickson
1,911	April 18, 2014	William Shatner, Jaime Pressly	N/A
1,912	April 21, 2014	George Lopez, Ari Graynor	N/A
1,913	April 22, 2014	Cedric the Entertainer, Billie Piper	N/A
1,914	April 23, 2014	Eddie Izzard, Lyle Lovett	N/A
1,915	April 24, 2014	Emily Deschanel, Zoe Lister-Jones	N/A
1,916	April 25, 2014	Billy Bob Thornton	St. Paul & the Broken Bones
1,917	April 28, 2014	Candice Accola, LL Cool J	N/A
Craig announces he is leaving The Late Late Show at the end of the year.
1,918	April 29, 2014	Valerie Bertinelli, Seth Gabel	N/A
1,919	April 30, 2014	Jim Gaffigan	N/A

=== May ===
No.	Original release date	Guest(s)	Musical/entertainment guest(s)
1,920	May 1, 2014	Cheryl Hines, Rampage Jackson	N/A
1,921	May 2, 2014	Christiane Amanpour, Rachael Taylor	N/A
1,922	May 5, 2014	Elisabeth Moss, Tom Felton	N/A
1,923	May 6, 2014	Colin Hanks, Richard Ayoade	N/A
1,924	May 7, 2014	Patton Oswalt, Megan Boone	N/A
1,925	May 8, 2014	Lisa Kudrow	N/A
1,926	May 9, 2014	Eugenio Derbez, Elizabeth Henstridge	A Great Big World
1,927	May 12, 2014	Angela Kinsey, Samantha Shannon	N/A
1,928	May 13, 2014	Billy Gardell, Lennon Parham, James Galea	N/A
1,929	May 14, 2014	Carrie Ann Inaba, Anthony Horowitz	N/A
1,930	May 15, 2014	Jenna Elfman, Bianca Kajlich	N/A
1,931	May 16, 2014	Sophia Bush, Jackie Collins	N/A
1,932	May 19, 2014	Regis Philbin	Jamestown Revival
1,933	May 20, 2014	Terry Bradshaw, Jessica McNamee	N/A
1,934	May 21, 2014	Jeff Foxworthy	The Colourist
1,935	May 22, 2014	Tom Lennon, Bob Oschack	2Cellos
1,936	May 23, 2014	Jon Favreau, Carrie Keagan	N/A
1,937	May 26, 2014	Shailene Woodley	Dan Boulger, Wild Child
1,938	May 27, 2014	Betty White, Richard Quest	Jamestown Revival
1,939	May 28, 2014	America Ferrera, Honeysuckle Weeks	N/A
1,940	May 29, 2014	Hugh Laurie	Hugh Laurie
1,941	May 30, 2014	William Shatner, Jessica St. Clair	N/A

=== June ===
No.	Original release date	Guest(s)	Musical/entertainment guest(s)
1,942	June 2, 2014	Bob Newhart, Constance Zimmer	N/A
1,943	June 3, 2014	Amanda Peet, Kit Harington	N/A
1,944	June 4, 2014	Susan Sarandon, Garrison Keillor	N/A
1,945	June 5, 2014	John Waters, Yunjin Kim	N/A
1,946	June 6, 2014	Ricky Gervais	Keb' Mo'
1,947	June 9, 2014	Bob Saget, Ashley Madekwe	N/A
1,948	June 10, 2014	Megan Mullally, T.J. Miller	N/A
1,949	June 11, 2014	Jay Baruchel, Regina Hall	N/A
1,950	June 12, 2014	Michelle Monaghan, Greg Proops	N/A
1,951	June 13, 2014	Max Greenfield	Ben & Ellen Harper
1,952	June 16, 2014	Henry Winkler, Lennon Parham	N/A
1,953	June 17, 2014	Simon Helberg	LP
1,954	June 18, 2014	Noah Wyle, Abigail Spencer	N/A
1,955	June 19, 2014	Carson Kressley, Shantel VanSanten	N/A
1,956	June 20, 2014	Maria Bello, Bradley Trevor Greive	N/A
1,957	June 23, 2014	Kathy Bates, Joel Stein	N/A
1,958	June 24, 2014	David Sedaris	Mindy Rickles
1,959	June 25, 2014	Alfred Molina, Moon Bloodgood	N/A
1,960	June 26, 2014	Jane Lynch, Keke Palmer	N/A
1,961	June 27, 2014	Ice-T, Mackenzie Davis	Body Count

=== July ===
No.	Original release date	Guest(s)	Musical/entertainment guest(s)
1,962	July 7, 2014	Kathy Griffin	Ingrid Michaelson
1,963	July 8, 2014	Tim Meadows	N/A
1,964	July 9, 2014	Michael Sheen	N/A
1,965	July 10, 2014	Carl Reiner, Valerie Azlynn	N/A
1,966	July 14, 2014	Margaret Cho, Zachary Levi	N/A
1,967	July 15, 2014	Nicole Richie, Nat Faxon	Mark Forward
1,968	July 16, 2014	Elijah Wood, Marcia Clark	Kristeen Young with Dave Grohl and Pat Smear
1,969	July 17, 2014	Julia Ormond, Dan Riskin	N/A
1,970	July 18, 2014	Aisha Tyler, Nat Faxon	N/A
1,971	July 21, 2014	Octavia Spencer, Brad Goreski	N/A
1,972	July 22, 2014	Regis Philbin, Irina Shayk	Switchfoot
1,973	July 23, 2014	Larry King	N/A
1,974	July 24, 2014	David Duchovny	Gloria Estefan
1,975	July 25, 2014	Bradley Cooper, Lisa Joyce	N/A
1,976	July 28, 2014	Olivia Williams	Josh Wolf
1,977	July 29, 2014	Simon Pegg, Jamie Chung	N/A
1,978	July 30, 2014	Dana Carvey, Brit Marling	N/A
1,979	July 31, 2014	Jesse Tyler Ferguson, Jón Gnarr	N/A

=== August ===
No.	Original release date	Guest(s)	Musical/entertainment guest(s)
1,980	August 1, 2014	Cat Deeley, Marcia Clark	N/A
1,981	August 4, 2014	Guy Pearce	Andi Osho
1,982	August 5, 2014	Diane Kruger	Brad Trackman
1,983	August 6, 2014	Kelsey Grammer, Sloane Crosley	N/A
1,984	August 7, 2014	Breckin Meyer, Morena Baccarin	N/A
1,985	August 8, 2014	Daniel Radcliffe	Cathy Ladman

=== September ===
No.	Original release date	Guest(s)	Musical/entertainment guest(s)
1,986	September 1, 2014	Ray Liotta, Annaleigh Ashford	N/A
1,987	September 2, 2014	Carrot Top, Gwendoline Christie	Comedian Carrot Top
1,988	September 3, 2014	David Arquette, Inbar Lavi	N/A
1,989	September 4, 2014	Rachael Ray	Ted Alexandro
1,990	September 5, 2014	Seth Green, journalist Lynette Rice	N/A
1,991	September 8, 2014	Katey Sagal, Michael Irvin	N/A
1,992	September 9, 2014	Julie Chen, Louie Anderson	N/A
1,993	September 10, 2014	Cheryl Hines, Lawrence Block	N/A
1,994	September 11, 2014	Wendie Malick, Ben Mezrich	N/A
1,995	September 12, 2014	Nikki Reed, Peter May	Nikki Reed and Paul McDonald
1,996	September 15, 2014	Kevin Bacon, Michael Bacon	The Bacon Brothers
1,997	September 16, 2014	Terry Bradshaw, Joel Stein	N/A
1,998	September 17, 2014	Paul Reiser, Aimee Garcia	N/A
1,999	September 18, 2014	Sharon Osbourne	Comedienne Carmen Lynch
2,000	September 19, 2014	Morgan Freeman, Genesis Rodriguez	N/A
2,001	September 22, 2014	Bill Hader, Scott Bakula	N/A
2,002	September 23, 2014	Lauren Graham, Ed Weeks	N/A
2,003	September 24, 2014	Judd Apatow, Jackie Guerrido	N/A
2,004	September 25, 2014	Mel B, Ben Schwartz	N/A
2,005	September 26, 2014	Ben Kingsley, Bojana Novakovic	N/A
2,006	September 29, 2014	Jim Gaffigan	Wolfgang Puck
2,007	September 30, 2014	Don Rickles, Eiza González	Daniel Sloss

=== October ===
No.	Original release date	Guest(s)	Musical/entertainment guest(s)
2,008	October 1, 2014	Patton Oswalt, Chandra Wilson	N/A
2,009	October 2, 2014	Joe Theismann, Lauren Cohan	N/A
2,010	October 3, 2014	Nick Lachey, Chloe Bennet	N/A
2,011	October 13, 2014	Carson Kressley, Rampage Jackson	N/A
2,012	October 14, 2014	James Marsden, Kristen Schaal	N/A
2,013	October 15, 2014	Zoe Saldaña, T.J. Miller	N/A
2,014	October 16, 2014	Joshua Jackson, Kara Cooney	N/A
2,015	October 17, 2014	Sean Hayes, "Weird Al" Yankovic	"Weird Al" Yankovic performs "Lame Claim to Fame" from Mandatory Fun
2,016	October 20, 2014	Sarah Paulson, Jim Rash	N/A
2,017	October 21, 2014	Pierce Brosnan, Krysten Ritter	N/A
2,018	October 22, 2014	Jason Schwartzman, Jacqueline Toboni	N/A
2,019	October 23, 2014	Shailene Woodley	N/A
2,020	October 24, 2014	Tenacious D, Jack McGee	Tenacious D perform "Classico" from The Pick of Destiny
2,021	October 27, 2014	Ray Romano, Tessa Thompson	N/A
2,022	October 28, 2014	Quentin Tarantino, Toni Trucks	N/A
2,023	October 29, 2014	Justin Long, Angélica Celaya	N/A
2,024	October 30, 2014	Cedric the Entertainer, Jayma Mays	N/A
2,025	October 31, 2014	Ted Danson	Alingon Mitra

=== November ===
No.	Original release date	Guest(s)	Musical/entertainment guest(s)
2,026	November 3, 2014	Joel McHale	N/A
2,027	November 5, 2014	Bob Newhart, Melissa Rauch	N/A
2,028	November 6, 2014	Marion Cotillard, Ross Matthews	N/A
2,029	November 7, 2014	Jimmy Kimmel, Yvette Nicole Brown	N/A
2,030	November 10, 2014	Eric Idle, David Tennant	Parmalee
2,031	November 11, 2014	Valerie Bertinelli, James Oswald	N/A
2,032	November 12, 2014	Steven Wright, Michaela Conlin	N/A
2,033	November 13, 2014	Simon Helberg, Gillian Jacobs	N/A
2,034	November 14, 2014	Jeff Daniels, Paula Poundstone	N/A
2,035	November 17, 2014	Metallica appeared all week as an artist in residency, Max Greenfield	
2,036	November 18, 2014	Jane Lynch	
2,037	November 19, 2014	Malin Akerman, Claire Holt	
2,038	November 20, 2014	Matthew McConaughey, Frank Nicotero	
2,039	November 21, 2014	Cillian Murphy, Jennifer Carpenter	
2,040	November 24, 2014	William Shatner	Erin Foley
2,041	November 25, 2014	Kristin Chenoweth, Michael Ealy	N/A
2,042	November 26, 2014	Wayne Brady, Alison Becker	N/A
2,043	November 28, 2014	Kat Dennings	Jermaine Fowler

=== December ===
No.	Original release date	Guest(s)	Musical/entertainment guest(s)
2,044	December 1, 2014	Lisa Kudrow, Dominic Monaghan	N/A
2,045	December 2, 2014	Ariel Tweto, Henry Winkler	N/A
2,046	December 3, 2014	Don Cheadle, Mary McCormack	N/A
2,047	December 4, 2014	Drew Carey, Max Greenfield	N/A
2,048	December 5, 2014	Kristen Bell, Steve Carell	N/A
2,049	December 8, 2014	Carrie Fisher, Dave Attell, Eddie Izzard	N/A
It's the Geoff Peterson-free show. Josh Robert Thompson is unavailable for the episode and Craig calls Secretariat into service as his sidekick for the evening.
2,050	December 9, 2014	Michael Sheen, Ben Schwartz	N/A
2,051	December 10, 2014	Mila Kunis, Bob Saget	N/A
2,052	December 11, 2014	Kunal Nayyar, Sarah Chalke	N/A
2,053	December 12, 2014	Rashida Jones, DJ Qualls	N/A
2,054	December 15, 2014	Jon Hamm, Tim Meadows	N/A
2,055	December 16, 2014	Larry King, Angela Kinsey	N/A
2,056	December 17, 2014	Betty White, Thomas Lennon	N/A
James Corden appeared in the cold open and discussed his taking over the program in March.
2,057	December 18, 2014	Jim Parsons	N/A
Josh Robert Thompson, who voices Geoff Peterson and other characters, appeared as himself in the cold open.
2,058	December 19, 2014	Jay Leno	N/A
Craig's final show starts with the usual cold open, but this time showing a montage of friends from the show performing Dead Man Fall's song "Bang Your Drum." Some are shown lip-synching to the song, while others are shown carrying and playing a large bass drum. Cameos in the montage include: Kevin Bacon and Kyra Sedgwick (plus dog Lily), Kristen Bell (plus daughter Delta Bell as "drum", 14 days before birth), Pierce Brosnan, Steve Carell, Don Cheadle, Kristin Chenoweth, Marion Cotillard, Tenacious D, Jeff Daniels, Ted Danson, Kat Dennings, Julia Louis-Dreyfus and Tony Hale, Carl Edwards, Cedric the Entertainer, Jon Hamm, Sean Hayes, Samuel L. Jackson, Rashida Jones, Toby Keith, Jimmy Kimmel, Larry King, Angela Kinsey, Mila Kunis, Lisa Kudrow, Thomas Lennon, Jane Lynch, Justin Long, James Marsden, Matthew McConaughey, Mary McCormack (plus the rattlesnake mug she gifted Ferguson), Joel McHale, Tim Meadows, Metallica, Kunal Nayyar, Geoff Peterson, Regis Philbin, Ray Romano, Bob Saget, William Shatner, Michael Sheen, Quentin Tarantino, Josh Robert Thompson, Archbishop Desmond Tutu, Betty White, Henry Winkler, Shailene Woodley, "Weird Al" Yankovic, Late Late Show Puppets and others. The pre-taped (35 of the cameos were guests taped at their final Late Late Show appearances, from Marsden on October 14 to White and Lennon on December 17) montage segued to the studio with Ferguson continuing the song backed by the occasional semi-house band Bone Patrol, Sex Pistols guitarist Steve Jones, a full choir, various celebrities, musicians and friends of the show. The monologue begins with a short time lapse of Craig coming out to start show through the last 10 years, starting on his first day (January 3, 2005) to his last day (December 19, 2014). Craig thanks his comedic partner Josh Robert Thompson, the viewers, the crew, and explains "Over the years, going with this show out and around, or going and doing stand-up with Josh, I've come into contact with a lot of people who are viewers of this show, and although I said my goodbyes to the crew, the people who made this show are you. You came to a show that, let's be honest, a bit of a fixer upper. It kind of stayed that way, but what I hope we've done ... maybe art is a very grand word, but I think what we managed to do here is make something that wasn't here before. So in that sense maybe it is a piece of art, it didn't exist and now it does. What we've done here, it doesn't go away because I stopped doing it, we stop doing this and we start doing something else ... maybe ... later, or maybe I go away and this is it! But I think what was more overwhelming than anything else in the experience of doing this show was making a connection with a country which I became a part of, which is astonishing to me. Even in the course of this show I became an American, officially and particularly for my friends at the IRS, I am now a fully fledged American. However, what I can't be is a member of a club, which I didn't really ask to join, I wanted to do this show ... and now we've done this show, and if you will indulge me in whatever I'm doing now and come to whatever I do next I'd be very grateful, because my kids are still young." After reading his last Tweets & E-mails and doing his final interview with guest Jay Leno, the show ends with his final segment: What Did We Learn on the Show Over the Last 10 Years Craig? Craig tells Geoff he wants to finally find out who the real identity of Secretariat is. Asked to lift up his mask, it's revealed to be Bob Newhart. Craig asks, "Bob Newhart?! What are you doing here?" To which he replies, "Hey man it's your dream." Craig wakes up next to Drew Carey as Nigel Wick and proceed to spoof the finales of Newhart (the show was all a dream), St. Elsewhere (he imagined it all from a snow globe) and The Sopranos (cut to black with Journey's Don't Stop Believin').
