= List of The Late Late Show with Craig Ferguson episodes (2012) =

Release
- Original network: CBS

Season chronology
- ← Previous; 2011 episodes Next → 2013 episodes

This is the list of episodes for The Late Late Show with Craig Ferguson in 2012.

== 2012 ==
No.	Original air date	Guest(s)	Musical/entertainment guest(s)
8-85	January 2, 2012	Tim Meadows	Eliza Doolittle, Myq Kaplan
8-86	January 3, 2012	Carrie Fisher, Matthew Gray Gubler	
8-87	January 4, 2012	RZA, Melissa Rauch	
8-88	January 5, 2012	Tom Selleck, Daniela Ruah	
8-89	January 6, 2012	Michael Clarke Duncan, Laura Prepon	
8-90	January 9, 2012	Howie Mandel	Randy Houser
8-91	January 10, 2012	Isaac Mizrahi, Sophia Bush	
8-92	January 11, 2012	Adam Goldberg, Mercedes Masohn	
8-93	January 12, 2012	Hugh Laurie	
8-94	January 13, 2012	Kristen Bell	Louie Anderson
8-95	January 16, 2012	Lucy Liu, Kevin Sorbo	
8-96	January 17, 2012	Colin Firth, Lynette Rice	
8-97	January 18, 2012	David Duchovny, Dr. Sanjay Gupta	
8-98	January 19, 2012	Steven Wright, Sara Paxton	
8-99	January 20, 2012	Larry the Cable Guy	3 Doors Down
8-100	January 30, 2012	Don Cheadle, Andrea Riseborough	
8-101	January 31, 2012	Ringo Starr	
8-102	February 1, 2012	William Shatner, Kathryn Hahn	
8-103	February 2, 2012	Daniel Radcliffe	Mark Forward
8-104	February 3, 2012	Rachel Bilson, Jonathan Ames	
8-105	February 6, 2012	Mark Harmon, Martha Plimpton	
8-106	February 7, 2012	Kenneth Branagh	Chad Daniels
8-107	February 8, 2012	Christina Applegate, Brad Goreski	
8-108	February 9, 2012	Lisa Kudrow	"Weird Al" Yankovic
8-109	February 10, 2012	Chelsea Handler, Dan Riskin	
8-110	February 13, 2012	Carol Burnett, Phil Keoghan	
8-111	February 14, 2012	Joss Stone	Joss Stone, Dave Stewart
8-112	February 15, 2012	Jon Cryer, Morena Baccarin	
8-113	February 16, 2012	Jeffrey Tambor, Amy Smart	
8-114	February 17, 2012	Simon Helberg	Margaret Cho
8-115	February 20, 2012	Jayma Mays, Jean-Michel Cousteau	
8-116	February 21, 2012	Bill Maher, Eloise Mumford	
8-117	February 22, 2012	Carson Kressley	Ramin Nazer
8-118	February 23, 2012	Malin Åkerman, Jon Ronson	
8-119	February 24, 2012	John Waters, Jennifer Carpenter	
8-120	February 27, 2012	Eric Idle, Sarah Paulson	
8-121	February 28, 2012	Dr. Mehmet Oz, Carrie Keagan	
8-122	February 29, 2012	Tom Lennon, Phil Plait	
8-123	March 1, 2012	Henry Winkler, Jay Baruchel	
8-124	March 2, 2012	Dennis Miller	The Light Brigade
8-125	March 5, 2012	Courteney Cox	Louie Anderson
8-126	March 6, 2012	Joel McHale, Dan Boulger	
8-127	March 7, 2012	Susan Sarandon	Rondell Sheridan
8-128	March 8, 2012	Raquel Welch, Carl Edwards	
8-129	March 9, 2012	Kristin Davis, Chris O'Dowd	
8-130	March 12, 2012	Leslie Bibb, David Milch	
8-131	March 13, 2012	Jason Segel, Jennette McCurdy	
8-132	March 14, 2012	Regis Philbin	
8-133	March 19, 2012	Anne Rice, Geoff Tate	
8-134	March 20, 2012	Kathy Bates, Brad Goreski	
8-135	March 21, 2012	Elizabeth Banks	
8-136	April 2, 2012	Julie Chen, Pau Gasol	
8-137	April 3, 2012	Ted Danson, Hannah Simone	
8-138	April 4, 2012	Jeffrey Tambor	The Lumineers
8-139	April 5, 2012	Jeffrey Dean Morgan, Bryan Miller	
8-140	April 6, 2012	Laura Linney, Grant Imahara	
8-141	April 9, 2012	Billy Gardell, Ian Gomez	
8-142	April 10, 2012	Guy Pearce, Jessica St. Clair	
8-143	April 11, 2012	Adam Goldberg, Robbie Montgomery	
8-144	April 12, 2012	Judd Apatow, Katherine Jenkins	
8-145	April 13, 2012	Sean Hayes, Lena Dunham	
8-146	April 16, 2012	Kathy Griffin	M. Ward
8-147	April 17, 2012	Kevin Kline, Alice Eve	
8-148	April 18, 2012	Michael Sheen, Michael Ian Black	
8-149	April 19, 2012	Kelly Preston, Joel Stein	
8-150	April 20, 2012	Emily Deschanel, Jerry Ferrara	
8-151	April 26, 2012	Toni Collette, Mike Massimino	
8-152	April 27, 2012	Patton Oswalt, Phoebe Tonkin	
8-153	April 30, 2012	Jim Gaffigan, Cat Cora	
8-154	May 1, 2012	Jesse Tyler Ferguson, Lennon Parham	
8-155	May 2, 2012	Anjelica Huston, Reno Wilson	
8-156	May 3, 2012	Julie Andrews, Michael Emerson	
8-157	May 4, 2012	Zooey Deschanel, Patrick Warburton	
8-158	May 7, 2012	Poppy Montgomery, Steve Guttenberg	
8-159	May 8, 2012	Steven Tyler, Jaime King	
8-160	May 9, 2012	Jenna Fischer, Danny Huston	
8-161	May 10, 2012	Christiane Amanpour, Anna Kendrick	
8-162	May 11, 2012	Larry King, Anna Chlumsky	
The Late Late Show with Craig Ferguson in Scotland
8-163	May 14, 2012	Mila Kunis, Michael Clarke Duncan, Rashida Jones, David Sedaris, Ariel Tweto	The Imagineers
8-164	May 15, 2012	Alex Salmond, Mila Kunis, Rashida Jones	The Imagineers
8-165	May 16, 2012	Michael Clarke Duncan, Mila Kunis	The Imagineers
8-166	May 17, 2012	Mila Kunis, Ariel Tweto, Fred MacAulay	The Imagineers
8-167	May 18, 2012	David Sedaris, Mila Kunis, Ariel Tweto, Rashida Jones	The Imagineers
8-168	May 21, 2012	Jeffrey Dean Morgan, Steven Wright	
8-169	May 22, 2012	Billy Bob Thornton, Sonya Walger	
8-170	May 23, 2012	Jennifer Love Hewitt, Rutina Wesley	
8-171	May 24, 2012	Alfred Molina	Sara Watkins
8-172	May 25, 2012	Jason Alexander, Angela Kinsey	
8-173	May 28, 2012	Benjamin McKenzie, Shohreh Aghdashloo	
8-174	May 29, 2012	DJ Qualls, Wolfgang Puck	
8-175	May 30, 2012	Howie Mandel, Sutton Foster	
8-176	May 31, 2012	Carrie Fisher, Tony Hale	
8-177	June 1, 2012	Jeff Garlin, Sonya Walger	
8-178	June 11, 2012	Jason Schwartzman	Rory Scovel
8-179	June 12, 2012	Andy García, Cody Horn	
8-180	June 13, 2012	Elliot Page, Lee Brice	
8-181	June 14, 2012	Don Rickles, Max Greenfield	
8-182	June 15, 2012	Jenna Elfman	The Imagineers
8-183	June 18, 2012	Alex Salmond, Kelly Macdonald, Kevin McKidd	
8-184	June 19, 2012	Steve Carell, Don Winslow	
8-185	June 20, 2012	Morgan Freeman, Ben Dukes	
8-186	June 21, 2012	Jeff Daniels, John Irving	
8-187	June 22, 2012	Mark Wahlberg, Sloane Crosley	
8-188	June 25, 2012	Elijah Wood, Kathleen Rose Perkins	
8-189	June 26, 2012	William Shatner, Breckin Meyer	
8-190	June 27, 2012	Lisa Kudrow, Harvey Weinstein	
8-191	June 28, 2012	Denis Leary, Brandi Carlile	
8-192	June 29, 2012	Tyler Perry	Matt Kirshen
8-193	July 16, 2012	Julie Chen, Chris Messina	
8-194	July 17, 2012	Cedric the Entertainer, Ari Graynor	
8-195	July 18, 2012	Ray Romano	Trampled by Turtles
8-196	July 19, 2012	Kenneth Branagh	Ted Alexandro
8-197	July 20, 2012	Jason Biggs, Jordana Brewster	Brian Scolaro
8-198	July 23, 2012	George Hamilton, Julie Gonzalo	
8-199	July 24, 2012	Minnie Driver, Colin Mochrie	
8-200	July 25, 2012	Matthew McConaughey	
8-201	July 26, 2012	Emile Hirsch, Ariel Tweto	
8-202	July 27, 2012	Vince Vaughn	
8-203	July 30, 2012	Emma Roberts, Paula Poundstone	
8-204	July 31, 2012	Rosie Perez	
8-205	August 1, 2012	Selma Blair, Adam Savage	
8-206	August 2, 2012	Rashida Jones, Julie Delpy	
8-207	August 3, 2012	Edward Norton, Malin Åkerman	
8-208	August 6, 2012	Stephen King, Dave Barry	Rock Bottom Remainders
8-209	August 7, 2012	Rachael Ray	The Imagineers
8-210	August 8, 2012	Chris Hardwick, Carla Gugino	

=== August ===
No.	Original release date	Guest(s)	Musical/entertainment guest(s)
1,566	August 27, 2012	Kristen Bell	N/A
1,567	August 28, 2012	Larry King	Michelle Buteau
1,568	August 29, 2012	Jeffrey Dean Morgan, Fiona Gubelmann	Nick Griffin
1,569	August 30, 2012	Lisa Kudrow, Marc Maron	N/A
1,570	August 31, 2012	Seth Green, Sutton Foster	Sutton Foster

=== September ===
No.	Original release date	Guest(s)	Musical/entertainment guest(s)
1,571	September 4, 2012	Kathy Griffin	N/A
1,572	September 5, 2012	Jeremy Irons, Monica Potter	N/A
1,573	September 6, 2012	Angela Kinsey, David Simon	The Heavy
1,574	September 7, 2012	Kunal Nayyar, Lauren Miller, Amber Earnest	N/A
1,575	September 10, 2012	Ben Stein, Rhona Mitra	Brooks McBeth
1,576	September 11, 2012	Adam Goldberg, Alison Becker	N/A
1,577	September 12, 2012	Heather Graham, Joel Stein	N/A
1,578	September 13, 2012	Katey Sagal, Michael J. Massimino	N/A
1,579	September 14, 2012	Tom Lennon, Brit Marling	N/A
1,580	September 17, 2012	Julie Chen, Warren Sapp	Lianne La Havas
1,581	September 18, 2012	John Goodman, Arjay Smith	Melissa Etheridge
1,582	September 19, 2012	Sophia Bush	N/A
1,583	September 20, 2012	Nikki Reed, Mitch Albom	N/A
1,584	September 21, 2012	Neil Patrick Harris	Gerry Dee
1,585	September 24, 2012	Dennis Quaid, Ellie Kemper	N/A
1,586	September 25, 2012	Tom Selleck, June Diane Raphael	N/A
1,587	September 26, 2012	Jim Parsons	Dispatch
1,588	September 27, 2012	Anne Heche, Jennifer Carpenter	N/A
1,589	September 28, 2012	Michael C. Hall, Martha Plimpton	N/A

=== October ===
No.	Original release date	Guest(s)	Musical/entertainment guest(s)
1,590	October 1, 2012	Jeff Garlin, Ethan Hawke	Lynyrd Skynyrd
1,591	October 2, 2012	Mindy Kaling	Carrot Top
1,592	October 3, 2012	Keanu Reeves, Dan Riskin	N/A
1,593	October 4, 2012	Roseanne Barr, Keke Palmer	N/A
1,594	October 5, 2012	Sanjay Gupta, Ginnifer Goodwin	N/A
1,595	October 15, 2012	Jeff Goldblum, Sarah Paulson	N/A
1,596	October 16, 2012	Lauren Graham, James Patterson	Michael Kiwanuka
1,597	October 17, 2012	Carson Kressley, Kay Adams	N/A
1,598	October 18, 2012	Kelsey Grammer, Casey Wilson	Ben Hague
1,599	October 19, 2012	Chelsea Handler, Nina Conti	Allen Stone
1,600	October 22, 2012	Bryan Cranston, Lisa Masterson	N/A
1,601	October 23, 2012	Phil McGraw, Hana Mae Lee	N/A
1,602	October 24, 2012	Susan Sarandon, David Benioff	Thomas Dale
1,603	October 25, 2012	Michael Chiklis, Maggie Grace	N/A
1,604	October 26, 2012	Amanda Peet, John Cho	N/A
1,605	October 29, 2012	Tom Hanks	Phil Hanley
1,606	October 30, 2012	Jay Leno	Lynyrd Skynyrd
1,607	October 31, 2012	Rashida Jones, David Morrissey	N/A

=== November ===
No.	Original release date	Guest(s)	Musical/entertainment guest(s)
1,608	November 1, 2012	Joel McHale, Alton Brown	N/A
1,609	November 2, 2012	Michael Sheen	Thomas Dale
1,610	November 5, 2012	Tenacious D, Sarah Shahi	N/A
1,611	November 7, 2012	Matthew Perry	RZA
1,612	November 8, 2012	LL Cool J, Naeomie Harris	Sutton Foster
1,613	November 9, 2012	Eric Idle, Emily VanCamp	N/A
1,614	November 12, 2012	DJ Qualls, Nikki Reed, Dave Attell	N/A
1,615	November 13, 2012	Katlin Mastandrea, Toby Keith, J. R. Martinez	N/A
1,616	November 14, 2012	Billy Crystal, Bérénice Marlohe	N/A
1,617	November 15, 2012	Max Greenfield, Lucy Punch	N/A
1,618	November 16, 2012	Richie Sambora, James Spader, Cynthia Littleton	N/A
1,619	November 19, 2012	Regis Philbin, Katie Aselton	N/A
1,620	November 20, 2012	Marion Cotillard, Kevin Pollak	N/A
1,621	November 26, 2012	Lily Tomlin, Matthew Gray Gubler	N/A
1,622	November 27, 2012	James Marsden, Daniela Ruah	Cory Kahaney
1,623	November 28, 2012	Lewis Black, Karen Gillan	LP
1,624	November 29, 2012	Kristin Davis, Nat Faxon	N/A
1,625	November 30, 2012	Tom Hanks, Tim Meadows, Mayim Bialik	N/A

=== December ===
No.	Original release date	Guest(s)	Musical/entertainment guest(s)
1,626	December 3, 2012	Seth MacFarlane, Miranda Kerr	Richie Sambora ("The Late Late Show Theme" with Craig & "Every Road Lead Home to You")
1,627	December 4, 2012	Reba McEntire, Keegan-Michael Key	Richie Sambora ("The Late Late Show Theme" & "Seven Years Gone")
1,628	December 5, 2012	Cheryl Hines, Peter Sagal	Richie Sambora ("The Late Late Show Theme" with Larry King)
1,629	December 6, 2012	Denis Leary	Richie Sambora ("The Late Late Show Theme" with Eddie Izzard & "Dead or Alive")
1,630	December 7, 2012	Julie Delpy, Lamorne Morris	Richie Sambora ("The Late Late Show Theme" with Dennis Leary & "Sugar Dady" with Craig)
1,631	December 10, 2012	Kristen Stewart, Sloane Crosley	N/A
1,632	December 11, 2012	Betty White, Morena Baccarin	Terry Fator (Stand-up routine)
1,633	December 12, 2012	Chris O'Dowd, Beth Behrs	N/A
1,634	December 13, 2012	Howie Mandel, Olivia Williams	N/A
1,635	December 14, 2012	Bradley Cooper, Wolfgang Puck	N/A
1,636	December 17, 2012	Sarah Chalke, Anne Rice	N/A
1,637	December 18, 2012	Don Johnson, Brad Goreski	N/A
1,638	December 19, 2012	Judd Apatow, Joanne Froggatt	N/A
1,639	December 20, 2012	Quentin Tarantino	N/A
1,640	December 21, 2012	Jamie Foxx, Bianca Kajlich	N/A
