= List of The Late Late Show with Craig Ferguson episodes (2014) =

Release
- Original network: CBS

Season chronology
- ← Previous; 2013 episodes Next → 2015 Guest hosts

This is the list of episodes for The Late Late Show with Craig Ferguson in 2014.

== 2014 ==
=== January ===
No.	Guests	MusicalGuests	Original release date
1,848	Kathy Griffin, Haley Joel Osment	N/A	January 6, 2014
1,849	Don Cheadle, Ivana Miličević	Jake Bugg	January 7, 2014
1,850	Mark Wahlberg, Michaela Conlin	N/A	January 8, 2014
1,851	Patton Oswalt, Hannah New	N/A	January 9, 2014
1,852	Bob Saget, Jane Levy	N/A	January 10, 2014
1,853	Kevin Bacon, Karla Souza	N/A	January 13, 2014
1,854	Aaron Eckhart, Lynette Rice	N/A	January 14, 2014
1,855	Tig Notaro, Julie Delpy	N/A	January 15, 2014
William Shatner appeared in the cold open.
1,856	Kenneth Branagh	Christian Finnegan	January 16, 2014
1,857	Chris Pine, Morena Baccarin	N/A	January 17, 2014
1,858	Denis Leary	N/A	January 20, 2014
1,859	Justin Long, Valerie Azlynn	N/A	January 21, 2014
1,860	Michelle Monaghan, Michael Irvin	N/A	January 22, 2014
1,861	Martha Plimpton	Sarah Jarosz	January 23, 2014
1,862	Christina Ricci, Ian Rankin	N/A	January 24, 2014
1,863	Max Greenfield	ZZ Ward	January 30, 2014
1,864	Hayden Panettiere	Brooke Van Poppelen	January 31, 2014
William Shatner appeared in the cold open.

=== February ===
No.	Guests	MusicalGuests	Original release date
1,865	Larry King	Henry Cho	February 3, 2014
1,866	Megan Mullally, J. Maarten Troost	N/A	February 4, 2014
1,867	Jim Parsons	N/A	February 5, 2014
1,868	John Goodman, Imogen Poots	N/A	February 6, 2014
1,869	Tom Lennon, Sarah Paulson	N/A	February 7, 2014
Yakov Smirnoff appeared in the cold open.
1,870	Julie Chen, Bubba Watson	N/A	February 10, 2014
1,871	Jason Alexander, Regina Hall	N/A	February 11, 2014
1,872	Kurt Russell, Aimee Garcia	N/A	February 12, 2014
1,873	Matt LeBlanc, Abbie Cornish	N/A	February 13, 2014
1,874	Elizabeth Banks	Chris Voth	February 14, 2014
1,875	Gary Oldman, Ellie Kemper	Roddy Hart and The Lonesome Fire	February 17, 2014
1,876	Ted Danson, Kristen Schaal	N/A	February 18, 2014
1,877	Kevin Costner, Krystal Keith	Tony Deyo	February 19, 2014
1,878	Joseph Gordon-Levitt, Lisa Vanderpump	N/A	February 20, 2014
1,879	Ken Jeong, Léa Seydoux	N/A	February 21, 2014
1,880	Zooey Deschanel, Vera Farmiga	Roddy Hart and The Lonesome Fire	February 24, 2014
Julia Mancuso appeared in the cold open.
1,881	Ashton Kutcher	Roddy Hart and The Lonesome Fire	February 25, 2014
1,882	Alice Eve, Bojana Novakovic	Roddy Hart and The Lonesome Fire	February 26, 2014
Taylor Hicks appeared in the cold open.
1,883	Julia Stiles, Dave Itzkoff	Roddy Hart and The Lonesome Fire	February 27, 2014
1,884	Sarah Chalke	Roddy Hart and The Lonesome Fire	February 28, 2014

=== March ===
No.	Guests	MusicalGuests	Original release date
1,885	Meredith Vieira, Josh Radnor	N/A	March 3, 2014
1,886	Elijah Wood, Keke Palmer	Glasvegas	March 4, 2014
1,887	Carson Kressley, Lena Headey	Panic! at the Disco	March 5, 2014
1,888	Rosie Perez	Bryan Kellen	March 6, 2014
1,889	Aaron Paul	Andi Osho	March 7, 2014
1,890	Emily Mortimer, Darrin Rose	The Alternate Routes	March 10, 2014
1,891	Jeff Goldblum, Lauren Cohan	N/A	March 11, 2014
1,892	Ricky Gervais, Lauren Cohan	N/A	March 12, 2014
1,893	Kristen Bell, Michael McMillian	N/A	March 13, 2014
1,894	Amy Smart, Denise Mina	N/A	March 14, 2014
1,895	Jane Lynch, Salman Rushdie	N/A	March 17, 2014
Drew Carey appears in cold open
1,896	Lewis Black, Dawn Olivieri	N/A	March 18, 2014
1,897	Uma Thurman, DJ Qualls	N/A	March 19, 2014
1,898	Betty White, Brett Dalton	N/A	March 24, 2014
1,899	Howie Mandel, Ginger Gonzaga	The Belle Brigade	March 25, 2014
1,900	Scarlett Johansson	Maz Jobrani	March 26, 2014
1,901	Carl Reiner, Connie Schultz	Joan Jett & The Blackhearts	March 31, 2014
As part of an April Fool's Day staff swap with The Price Is Right, Drew Carey hosted with four sidekicks -- George Gray, Rachel Reynolds, Amber Lancaster and Manuela Arbeláez. Ferguson, Stevens, and "Secretariat" were on Price hours later.

=== April ===
No.	Guests	MusicalGuests	Original release date
1,902	Cat Deeley, Gina Carano	N/A	April 7, 2014
1,903	Jon Hamm, Pam Dawber	N/A	April 8, 2014
1,904	Sharon Osbourne, Tony Kanaan	N/A	April 9, 2014
1,905	Morgan Freeman	Adam Ray	April 10, 2014
1,906	Wanda Sykes, Malin Akerman	N/A	April 11, 2014
1,907	Dominic Monaghan, Brooklyn Decker	N/A	April 14, 2014
1,908	Wendie Malick, Jim Rash	N/A	April 15, 2014
1,909	Kunal Nayyar	Tom Segura	April 16, 2014
1,910	Kevin Bacon	Andy Hendrickson	April 17, 2014
1,911	William Shatner, Jaime Pressly	N/A	April 18, 2014
1,912	George Lopez, Ari Graynor	N/A	April 21, 2014
1,913	Cedric the Entertainer, Billie Piper	N/A	April 22, 2014
1,914	Eddie Izzard, Lyle Lovett	N/A	April 23, 2014
1,915	Emily Deschanel, Zoe Lister-Jones	N/A	April 24, 2014
1,916	Billy Bob Thornton	St. Paul & the Broken Bones	April 25, 2014
1,917	Candice Accola, LL Cool J	N/A	April 28, 2014
1,918	Valerie Bertinelli, Seth Gabel	N/A	April 29, 2014
1,919	Jim Gaffigan	N/A	April 30, 2014

=== May ===
No.	Guests	MusicalGuests	Original release date
1,920	Cheryl Hines, Rampage Jackson	N/A	May 1, 2014
1,921	Christiane Amanpour, Rachael Taylor	N/A	May 2, 2014
1,922	Elisabeth Moss, Tom Felton	N/A	May 5, 2014
1,923	Colin Hanks, Richard Ayoade	N/A	May 6, 2014
1,924	Patton Oswalt, Megan Boone	N/A	May 7, 2014
1,925	Lisa Kudrow	N/A	May 8, 2014
1,926	Eugenio Derbez, Elizabeth Henstridge	A Great Big World	May 9, 2014
1,927	Angela Kinsey, Samantha Shannon	N/A	May 12, 2014
1,928	Billy Gardell, Lennon Parham, James Galea	N/A	May 13, 2014
1,929	Carrie Ann Inaba, Anthony Horowitz	N/A	May 14, 2014
1,930	Jenna Elfman, Bianca Kajlich	N/A	May 15, 2014
1,931	Sophia Bush, Jackie Collins	N/A	May 16, 2014
1,932	Regis Philbin	Jamestown Revival	May 19, 2014
1,933	Terry Bradshaw, Jessica McNamee	N/A	May 20, 2014
1,934	Jeff Foxworthy	The Colourist	May 21, 2014
1,935	Tom Lennon, Bob Oschack	2Cellos	May 22, 2014
1,936	Jon Favreau, Carrie Keagan	N/A	May 23, 2014
1,937	Shailene Woodley	Dan Boulger, Wild Child	May 26, 2014
1,938	Betty White, Richard Quest	Jamestown Revival	May 27, 2014
1,939	America Ferrera, Honeysuckle Weeks	N/A	May 28, 2014
1,940	Hugh Laurie	Hugh Laurie	May 29, 2014
1,941	William Shatner, Jessica St. Clair	N/A	May 30, 2014

=== June ===
No.	Guests	MusicalGuests	Original release date
1,942	Bob Newhart, Constance Zimmer	N/A	June 2, 2014
1,943	Amanda Peet, Kit Harington	N/A	June 3, 2014
1,944	Susan Sarandon, Garrison Keillor	N/A	June 4, 2014
1,945	John Waters, Yunjin Kim	N/A	June 5, 2014
1,946	Ricky Gervais	Keb' Mo'	June 6, 2014
1,947	Bob Saget, Ashley Madekwe	N/A	June 9, 2014
1,948	Megan Mullally, T.J. Miller	N/A	June 10, 2014
1,949	Jay Baruchel, Regina Hall	N/A	June 11, 2014
1,950	Michelle Monaghan, Greg Proops	N/A	June 12, 2014
1,951	Max Greenfield	Ben & Ellen Harper	June 13, 2014
1,952	Henry Winkler, Lennon Parham	N/A	June 16, 2014
1,953	Simon Helberg	LP	June 17, 2014
1,954	Noah Wyle, Abigail Spencer	N/A	June 18, 2014
1,955	Carson Kressley, Shantel VanSanten	N/A	June 19, 2014
1,956	Maria Bello, Bradley Trevor Greive	N/A	June 20, 2014
1,957	Kathy Bates, Joel Stein	N/A	June 23, 2014
1,958	David Sedaris	Mindy Rickles	June 24, 2014
1,959	Alfred Molina, Moon Bloodgood	N/A	June 25, 2014
1,960	Jane Lynch, Keke Palmer	N/A	June 26, 2014
1,961	Ice-T, Mackenzie Davis	Body Count	June 27, 2014

=== July ===
No.	Guests	MusicalGuests	Original release date
1,962	Kathy Griffin	Ingrid Michaelson	July 7, 2014
1,963	Tim Meadows	N/A	July 8, 2014
1,964	Michael Sheen	N/A	July 9, 2014
1,965	Carl Reiner, Valerie Azlynn	N/A	July 10, 2014
1,966	Margaret Cho, Zachary Levi	N/A	July 14, 2014
1,967	Nicole Richie, Nat Faxon	Mark Forward	July 15, 2014
1,968	Elijah Wood, Marcia Clark	Kristeen Young with Dave Grohl and Pat Smear	July 16, 2014
1,969	Julia Ormond, Dan Riskin	N/A	July 17, 2014
1,970	Aisha Tyler, Nat Faxon	N/A	July 18, 2014
1,971	Octavia Spencer, Brad Goreski	N/A	July 21, 2014
1,972	Regis Philbin, Irina Shayk	Switchfoot	July 22, 2014
1,973	Larry King	N/A	July 23, 2014
1,974	David Duchovny	Gloria Estefan	July 24, 2014
1,975	Bradley Cooper, Lisa Joyce	N/A	July 25, 2014
1,976	Olivia Williams	Josh Wolf	July 28, 2014
1,977	Simon Pegg, Jamie Chung	N/A	July 29, 2014
1,978	Dana Carvey, Brit Marling	N/A	July 30, 2014
1,979	Jesse Tyler Ferguson, Jón Gnarr	N/A	July 31, 2014

=== August ===
No.	Guests	MusicalGuests	Original release date
1,980	Cat Deeley, Marcia Clark	N/A	August 1, 2014
1,981	Guy Pearce	Andi Osho	August 4, 2014
1,982	Diane Kruger	Brad Trackman	August 5, 2014
1,983	Kelsey Grammer, Sloane Crosley	N/A	August 6, 2014
1,984	Breckin Meyer, Morena Baccarin	N/A	August 7, 2014
1,985	Daniel Radcliffe	Cathy Ladman	August 8, 2014

=== September ===
No.	Guests	MusicalGuests	Original release date
1,986	Ray Liotta, Annaleigh Ashford	N/A	September 1, 2014
1,987	Carrot Top, Gwendoline Christie	N/A	September 2, 2014
1,988	David Arquette, Inbar Lavi	N/A	September 3, 2014
1,989	Rachael Ray	Ted Alexandro	September 4, 2014
1,990	Seth Green, Lynette Rice	N/A	September 5, 2014
1,991	Katey Sagal, Michael Irvin	N/A	September 8, 2014
1,992	Julie Chen, Louie Anderson	N/A	September 9, 2014
1,993	Cheryl Hines, Lawrence Block	N/A	September 10, 2014
1,994	Wendie Malick, Ben Mezrich	N/A	September 11, 2014
1,995	Nikki Reed, Peter May	Paul McDonald	September 12, 2014
1,996	Kevin Bacon	The Bacon Brothers	September 15, 2014
1,997	Terry Bradshaw, Joel Stein	N/A	September 16, 2014
1,998	Paul Reiser, Aimee Garcia	N/A	September 17, 2014
1,999	Sharon Osbourne	Carmen Lynch	September 18, 2014
2,000	Morgan Freeman, Genesis Rodriguez	N/A	September 19, 2014
2,001	Bill Hader, Scott Bakula	N/A	September 22, 2014
2,002	Lauren Graham, Ed Weeks	N/A	September 23, 2014
2,003	Judd Apatow, Jackie Guerrido	N/A	September 24, 2014
2,004	Mel B, Ben Schwartz	N/A	September 25, 2014
2,005	Ben Kingsley, Bojana Novakovic	N/A	September 26, 2014
2,006	Jim Gaffigan	Wolfgang Puck	September 29, 2014
2,007	Don Rickles, Eiza González	Daniel Sloss	September 30, 2014

=== October ===
No.	Guests	MusicalGuests	Original release date
2,008	Patton Oswalt, Chandra Wilson	N/A	October 1, 2014
2,009	Joe Theismann, Lauren Cohan	N/A	October 2, 2014
2,010	Nick Lachey, Chloe Bennet	N/A	October 3, 2014
2,011	Carson Kressley, Rampage Jackson	N/A	October 13, 2014
2,012	James Marsden, Kristen Schaal	N/A	October 14, 2014
2,013	Zoe Saldaña, T.J. Miller	N/A	October 15, 2014
2,014	Josh Jackson, Kara Cooney	N/A	October 16, 2014
2,015	Sean Hayes, "Weird Al" Yankovic	"Weird Al" Yankovic	October 17, 2014
2,016	Sarah Paulson, Jim Rash	N/A	October 20, 2014
2,017	Pierce Brosnan, Krysten Ritter	N/A	October 21, 2014
2,018	Jason Schwartzman, Jacqueline Toboni	N/A	October 22, 2014
2,019	Shailene Woodley	N/A	October 23, 2014
2,020	Tenacious D, Jack McGee	N/A	October 24, 2014
2,021	Ray Romano, Tessa Thompson	N/A	October 27, 2014
2,022	Quentin Tarantino, Toni Trucks	N/A	October 28, 2014
2,023	Justin Long, Angélica Celaya	N/A	October 29, 2014
2,024	Cedric the Entertainer, Jayma Mays	N/A	October 30, 2014
2,025	Ted Danson	Alingon Mitra	October 31, 2014

=== November ===
No.	Guests	MusicalGuests	Original release date
2,026	Joel McHale	N/A	November 3, 2014
2,027	Bob Newhart, Melissa Rauch	N/A	November 5, 2014
2,028	Marion Cotillard, Ross Mathews	N/A	November 6, 2014
2,029	Jimmy Kimmel, Yvette Nicole Brown	N/A	November 7, 2014
2,030	Eric Idle, David Tennant, Parmalee	N/A	November 10, 2014
2,031	Valerie Bertinelli, James Oswald	N/A	November 11, 2014
2,032	Steven Wright, Michaela Conlin	N/A	November 12, 2014
2,033	Simon Helberg, Gillian Jacobs	N/A	November 13, 2014
2,034	Jeff Daniels, Paula Poundstone	N/A	November 14, 2014
2,035	Metallica, Max Greenfield	Metallica	November 17, 2014
2,036	Jane Lynch	Metallica	November 18, 2014
2,037	Malin Akerman, Claire Holt	Metallica	November 19, 2014
2,038	Matthew McConaughey, Frank Nicotero	Metallica	November 20, 2014
2,039	Cillian Murphy, Jennifer Carpenter	Metallica	November 21, 2014
2,040	William Shatner	Erin Foley	November 24, 2014
2,041	Kristin Chenoweth, Michael Ealy	N/A	November 25, 2014
2,042	Wayne Brady, Alison Becker	N/A	November 26, 2014
2,043	Kat Dennings	Jermaine Fowler	November 28, 2014

=== December ===
No.	Guests	MusicalGuests	Original release date
2,044	Lisa Kudrow, Dominic Monaghan	N/A	December 1, 2014
2,045	Ariel Tweto, Henry Winkler	N/A	December 2, 2014
2,046	Don Cheadle, Mary McCormack	N/A	December 3, 2014
2,047	Drew Carey, Max Greenfield	N/A	December 4, 2014
2,048	Kristen Bell, Steve Carell	N/A	December 5, 2014
2,049	Carrie Fisher, Dave Attell, Eddie Izzard	N/A	December 8, 2014
2,050	Michael Sheen, Ben Schwartz	N/A	December 9, 2014
2,051	Mila Kunis, Bob Saget	N/A	December 10, 2014
2,052	Kunal Nayyar, Sarah Chalke	N/A	December 11, 2014
2,053	Rashida Jones, DJ Qualls	N/A	December 12, 2014
2,054	Jon Hamm, Tim Meadows	N/A	December 15, 2014
2,055	Larry King, Angela Kinsey	N/A	December 16, 2014
2,056	Betty White, Thomas Lennon	N/A	December 17, 2014
James Corden appeared in the cold open and discussed his taking over the program in March.
2,057	Jim Parsons	N/A	December 18, 2014
Josh Robert Thompson, who voices Geoff Peterson and other characters, appeared as himself in the cold open.
2,058	Jay Leno	N/A	December 19, 2014
Craig's final show starts with the usual cold open, but this time showing a montage of friends from the show performing Dead Man Fall's song "Bang Your Drum." Some are shown lip-synching to the song, while others are shown carrying and playing a large bass drum. Cameos in the montage include: Kevin Bacon and Kyra Sedgwick (plus dog Lily), Kristen Bell (plus daughter Delta Bell as "drum", 14 days before birth), Pierce Brosnan, Steve Carell, Don Cheadle, Kristin Chenoweth, Marion Cotillard, Tenacious D, Jeff Daniels, Ted Danson, Kat Dennings, Julia Louis-Dreyfus and Tony Hale, Carl Edwards, Cedric the Entertainer, Jon Hamm, Sean Hayes, Samuel L. Jackson, Rashida Jones, Toby Keith, Jimmy Kimmel, Larry King, Angela Kinsey, Mila Kunis, Lisa Kudrow, Thomas Lennon, Jane Lynch, Justin Long, James Marsden, Matthew McConaughey, Mary McCormack (plus the rattlesnake mug she gifted Ferguson), Joel McHale, Tim Meadows, Metallica, Kunal Nayyar, Geoff Peterson, Regis Philbin, Ray Romano, Bob Saget, William Shatner, Michael Sheen, Quentin Tarantino, Josh Robert Thompson, Archbishop Desmond Tutu, Betty White, Henry Winkler, Shailene Woodley, "Weird Al" Yankovic, Late Late Show Puppets and others. The pre-taped (35 of the cameos were guests taped at their final Late Late Show appearances, from Marsden on October 14 to White and Lennon on December 17) montage segued to the studio with Ferguson continuing the song backed by the occasional semi-house band Bone Patrol, Sex Pistols guitarist Steve Jones a full choir, various celebrities, musicians and friends of the show. The monologue begins with a short time lapse of Craig coming out to start show through the last 10 years, starting on his first day (January 3, 2005) to his last. Craig thanks his comedic partner Josh Robert Thompson, the viewers, the crew, and explains "Over the years, going with this show out and around, or going and doing stand-up with Josh, I've come into contact with a lot of people who are viewers of this show, and although I said my goodbyes to the crew, the people who made this show are you. You came to a show that, let's be honest, a bit of a fixer upper. It kind of stayed that way, but what I hope we've done ... maybe art is a very grand word, but I think what we managed to do here is make something that wasn't here before. So in that sense maybe it is a piece of art, it didn't exist and now it does. What we've done here, it doesn't go away because I stopped doing it, we stop doing this and we start doing something else ... maybe ... later, or maybe I go away and this is it! But I think what was more overwhelming than anything else in the experience of doing this show was making a connection with a country which I became a part of, which is astonishing to me. Even in the course of this show I became an American, officially and particularly for my friends at the IRS, I am now a fully fledged American. However, what I can't be is a member of a club, which I didn't really ask to join, I wanted to do this show ... and now we've done this show, and if you will indulge me in whatever I'm doing now and come to whatever I do next I'd be very grateful, because my kids are still young." After reading his last Tweets & E-mails and doing his final interview with guest Jay Leno, the show ends with his final segment: What Did We Learn on the Show Over the Last 10 Years Craig? Craig tells Geoff he wants to finally find out who the real identity of Secretariat is. Asked to lift up his mask, it's revealed to be Bob Newhart. Craig asks, "Bob Newhart?! What are you doing here?" To which he replies, "Hey man it's your dream." Craig wakes up next to Drew Carey as Nigel Wick and proceed to spoof the finales of Newhart (the show was all a dream), St. Elsewhere (he imagined it all from a snowglobe) and The Sopranos (cut to black with Journey's Don't Stop Believin').
