= List of The Late Late Show with Craig Ferguson episodes (2013) =

- No. of episodes: 207

Release
- Original network: CBS

Season chronology
- ← Previous; 2012 episodes Next → 2014 episodes

The following episodes of The Late Late Show with Craig Ferguson aired in 2013.

== 2013 ==
=== January ===
No.	Original release date	Guest(s)	Musical/entertainment guest(s)
1,641	January 7, 2013	Billy Gardell, Krysten Ritter	N/A
1,642	January 8, 2013	Billy Connolly, Meaghan Rath	N/A
1,643	January 9, 2013	Steven Wright, Genesis Rodriguez	N/A
1,644	January 10, 2013	Tim Allen, Margaret Cho	N/A
1,645	January 11, 2013	Julie Chen, Angela Kinsey	N/A
1,646	January 14, 2013	Jenna Elfman, Guillermo del Toro	N/A
1,647	January 15, 2013	Lena Dunham, Bill Pullman	N/A
1,648	January 16, 2013	Don Cheadle, DJ Qualls	N/A
1,649	January 17, 2013	Julia Stiles, Jerry Ferrara	Tom Cotter (Stand-up routine)
1,650	January 18, 2013	Carrie Fisher, Steven Yeun	N/A
1,651	January 28, 2013	Kathy Griffin, Michael Weatherly	Bone Patrol
1,652	January 29, 2013	Simon Helberg, Maria Bamford	Bone Patrol
1,653	January 30, 2013	Dominic Monaghan, Ellie Kemper	Bone Patrol
1,654	January 31, 2013	Rashida Jones, Julie Gonzalo	Bone Patrol

=== February ===
No.	Original release date	Guest(s)	Musical/entertainment guest(s)
1,655	February 1, 2013	Joe Theismann, Ariel Tweto	Bone Patrol
1,656	February 3, 2013	The Craig Ferguson Super Bowl Special: Drew Brees, Steve Carell, Nikki Reed, Channing Tatum, Julie Chen, Neil Patrick Harris	Bone Patrol
1,657	February 4, 2013	Zooey Deschanel, Adhir Kalyan	N/A
1,658	February 5, 2013	David Boreanaz, Alison Becker	N/A
1,659	February 6, 2013	Emmy Rossum, Jon Ronson	N/A
1,660	February 7, 2013	Amanda Peet, Paul Williams	N/A
1,661	February 8, 2013	Alfred Molina	Ophira Eisenberg (Stand-up routine)
1,662	February 11, 2013	Julie Andrews, Grace Park	N/A
1,663	February 12, 2013	Ted Danson, Teresa Palmer	N/A
1,664	February 13, 2013	Russell Brand, Allison Williams	N/A
1,665	February 14, 2013	George Lopez, Sutton Foster	N/A
1,666	February 15, 2013	Jane Lynch, Mario Lopez	N/A
1,667	February 18, 2013	Jacki Weaver, Jim Gaffigan	Nicola Benedetti ("Romance: Andante")
1,668	February 19, 2013	Jon Cryer, Melissa Benoist	N/A
1,669	February 20, 2013	Lisa Kudrow, Bonnie Raitt	N/A
1,670	February 21, 2013	Kunal Nayyar, Molly Shannon	N/A
1,671	February 22, 2013	William Shatner, Alona Tal	N/A
1,672	February 25, 2013	Keith Olbermann, Coco Rocha	N/A
1,673	February 26, 2013	Sharon Osbourne, Matthew Lillard	N/A
1,674	February 27, 2013	Mike Tyson, Tom Lennon	N/A
1,675	February 28, 2013	David Duchovny, Ashley Madekwe	N/A

=== March ===
No.	Original release date	Guest(s)	Musical/entertainment guest(s)
1,676	March 1, 2013	Trace Adkins, Naya Rivera	N/A
1,677	March 4, 2013	Jeffrey Dean Morgan, Katheryn Winnick	N/A
1,678	March 5, 2013	Larry King, Abbie Cornish	N/A
1,679	March 6, 2013	Christina Hendricks, Jackie Collins	N/A
1,680	March 7, 2013	Zach Braff, Gillian Jacobs	N/A
1,681	March 8, 2013	Chi McBride, Laurie Holden	N/A
1,682	March 11, 2013	George Hamilton, Jessica Lucas	N/A
1,683	March 12, 2013	Minnie Driver, Ben Schwartz	N/A
1,684	March 13, 2013	Olivia Wilde, Windell Middlebrooks	N/A
1,685	March 14, 2013	Monica Potter, Jim Rome	N/A
1,686	March 15, 2013	Megan Mullally, Alison Brie	N/A
1,687	March 18, 2013	Jenna-Louise Coleman, Seth Green	N/A
1,688	March 19, 2013	Michelle Monaghan, John Green	N/A
1,689	March 20, 2013	Aaron Eckhart, Kellie Pickler	N/A
1,690	March 25, 2013	Morgan Freeman, Vera Farmiga	N/A
1,691	March 26, 2013	Sarah Chalke, Lawrence Block	N/A
1,692	March 27, 2013	Don Rickles, Radha Mitchell	N/A

=== April ===
No.	Original release date	Guest(s)	Musical/entertainment guest(s)
1,693	April 8, 2013	Max Greenfield, Debbie Reynolds	N/A
1,694	April 9, 2013	Drew Carey, Jane Levy	N/A
1,695	April 10, 2013	Julia Louis-Dreyfus	He's My Brother She's My Sister ("Same Old Ground")
1,696	April 11, 2013	Anna Chlumsky, Carl Reiner	N/A
1,697	April 12, 2013	Jason Biggs, Keke Palmer	N/A
1,698	April 15, 2013	Rob Lowe, Larry King	N/A
Special format episode. Cold open monologue on the Boston bombing. Last-minute guest Larry King discusses news broadcasting on tragic events. Opening credits, comedic monologue, sidekicks Geoff Peterson and Secretariat are omitted.
1,699	April 16, 2013	Selma Blair, Nathan Fielder	N/A
1,700	April 17, 2013	Brad Goreski, Melissa Rauch	N/A
1,701	April 18, 2013	Ginnifer Goodwin, Salman Rushdie	N/A
1,702	April 19, 2013	Harrison Ford, Ariel Tweto	N/A
1,703	April 22, 2013	Kat Dennings, Philip Kerr	N/A
1,704	April 23, 2013	Kevin Bacon, Rebecca Hall	N/A
1,705	April 24, 2013	Rainn Wilson, Karen Gillan	N/A
1,706	April 25, 2013	Zac Efron, Anna Quindlen	N/A
1,707	April 26, 2013	Robin Wright	Myq Kaplan (Stand-up routine)
1,708	April 29, 2013	Mary McCormack, Jim O'Heir	N/A
1,709	April 30, 2013	Larry the Cable Guy, Abigail Spencer	N/A

=== May ===
No.	Original release date	Guest(s)	Musical/entertainment guest(s)
1,710	May 1, 2013	Michael Ian Black, Lena Headey	N/A
1,711	May 2, 2013	Pierce Brosnan	Tone Bell (Stand-up routine)
1,712	May 3, 2013	Angela Kinsey, Simon Amstell	N/A
1,713	May 6, 2013	Isla Fisher, Jim Rash	N/A
1,714	May 7, 2013	Ryan Seacrest, Andrea Osvárt	N/A
1,715	May 8, 2013	Lauren Graham	Ben Dukes ("Old Fixer Upper")
1,716	May 9, 2013	Bob Saget, Sarah Hyland	N/A
1,717	May 10, 2013	Tom Lennon, Cat Deeley	N/A
1,718	May 13, 2013	John Cho, Sara Rue	N/A
1,719	May 14, 2013	Ray Liotta	Pistol Annies ("Unhappily Married"), DeAnne Smith (Stand-up routine)
1,720	May 15, 2013	Ice-T, Paula Poundstone	N/A
1,721	May 16, 2013	Paul Reiser, Yunjin Kim	N/A
1,722	May 17, 2013	William Shatner, Natalie Dormer	N/A
1,723	May 20, 2013	Heather Graham, David Benioff	N/A
1,724	May 21, 2013	Zach Galifianakis, Andrea Riseborough	N/A
1,725	May 22, 2013	Stephen Fry	N/A
1,726	May 27, 2013	Ben Kingsley, Alia Shawkat	N/A
1,727	May 28, 2013	Elliot Page, George Stroumboulopoulos	N/A
1,728	May 29, 2013	Howie Mandel, Brit Marling	N/A
1,729	May 30, 2013	Jeff Garlin, Anne Heche	N/A
1,730	May 31, 2013	Kathy Griffin	Bad Rabbits ("Can't Fool Me")

=== June ===
No.	Original release date	Guest(s)	Musical/entertainment guest(s)
1,731	June 3, 2013	Steven Tyler, Olga Kurylenko	N/A
1,732	June 4, 2013	Bill Maher, Cat Cora	N/A
1,733	June 5, 2013	Dr. Sanjay Gupta, Gretchen Wilson	N/A
1,734	June 6, 2013	Betty White, Sarah Paulson	N/A
1,735	June 7, 2013	Ethan Hawke, Jamie Chung	N/A
1,736	June 10, 2013	Jonah Hill, Tony Kanaan	N/A
1,737	June 11, 2013	Margaret Cho, Hugh Dancy	N/A
1,738	June 12, 2013	Valerie Bertinelli, Adam Ray	N/A
1,739	June 13, 2013	Seth Rogen, Elisabeth Moss	N/A
1,740	June 14, 2013	Emily Mortimer	Barry Rothbart (Stand-up routine)
1,741	June 17, 2013	Carson Kressley, Rachelle Lefevre	N/A
1,742	June 18, 2013	Angie Harmon, Ben Mezrich	N/A
1,743	June 19, 2013	Rosie Perez	The Rubens ("The Day You Went Away")
1,744	June 20, 2013	Lewis Black	Matt Morales (Stand-up Routine)
1,745	June 21, 2013	Maggie Gyllenhaal, Matt Goldich	N/A
1,746	June 24, 2013	Toni Collette, Dylan Moran	N/A
1,747	June 25, 2013	Breckin Meyer, Wendie Malick	N/A
1,748	June 26, 2013	Sandra Bullock, Jim McDonald	N/A
1,749	June 27, 2013	Channing Tatum, Marc Maron	N/A
1,750	June 28, 2013	Tenacious D, Moon Bloodgood	N/A

=== July ===
No.	Original release date	Guest(s)	Musical/entertainment guest(s)
1,751	July 8, 2013	Heather Locklear	Louie Anderson (stand-up routine)
1,752	July 9, 2013	Morgan Freeman	Cathy Ladman (stand-up routine)
1,753	July 10, 2013	Cedric the Entertainer, Jess Weixler	N/A
1,754	July 11, 2013	Maria Bello, Scott Adsit	N/A
1,755	July 12, 2013	Jeff Daniels	Jeff Daniels ("Have a Good Life Then Die"), Sarah Tiana (Stand-up routine)
1,756	July 15, 2013	Julie Chen	Michael Palascak (Stand-up routine)
1,757	July 16, 2013	Jon Hamm, Georgia King	N/A
1,758	July 17, 2013	Anthony Hopkins, Jes Macallan	N/A
1,759	July 18, 2013	Jeffrey Tambor	Cristela Alonzo (Stand-up routine)
1,760	July 19, 2013	Jane Lynch	Goo Goo Dolls ("Come to Me")
1,761	July 22, 2013	Brooke Shields, Sara Bareilles	Sara Bareilles ("Brave")
1,762	July 23, 2013	Larry King, Anna Camp	N/A
1,763	July 24, 2013	Matt Smith, Teri Polo	N/A
1,764	July 25, 2013	Bill Hader, Shohreh Aghdashloo	N/A
1,765	July 26, 2013	Lisa Kudrow	Michael McDonald (Stand-up routine)
1,766	July 29, 2013	Courtney Love, Jeff Kurr	N/A
1,767	July 30, 2013	Henry Winkler, Valerie Azlynn	N/A
1,768	July 31, 2013	Jane Leeves, Ahna O'Reilly	Backstreet Boys ("Trust Me")

=== August ===
No.	Original release date	Guest(s)	Musical/entertainment guest(s)
1,769	August 1, 2013	Anthony Edwards	Hugh Moore (Stand-up routine)
1,770	August 2, 2013	Josh Wolf, Georgia King	N/A
1,771	August 5, 2013	Minnie Driver	Minnie Driver ("Close to Me"), Baron Vaughn (Stand-up routine)
1,772	August 6, 2013	Diane Kruger, Tony Hale	N/A
1,773	August 7, 2013	Jeff Goldblum	Jeff Goldblum ("Straight No Chesser")
1,774	August 8, 2013	James Marsden, Meghan Markle	N/A
1,775	August 9, 2013	Keith Olbermann	Esther Povitsky (Stand-up routine)

=== September ===
No.	Original release date	Guest(s)	Musical/entertainment guest(s)
1,776	September 2, 2013	Angela Kinsey, David Feherty	N/A
1,777	September 3, 2013	Jay Leno	Cameron Esposito
1,778	September 4, 2013	Elijah Wood, Brie Larson	N/A
1,779	September 5, 2013	Vin Diesel, Sara Gilbert	N/A
1,780	September 6, 2013	Thomas Lennon	The Wild Feathers ("The Ceiling")
1,781	September 9, 2013	Alice Eve, Shirley Jones	N/A
1,782	September 10, 2013	Anna Faris, Jean-Michel Cousteau	N/A
1,783	September 11, 2013	Max Greenfield, Amy Smart	N/A
1,784	September 12, 2013	Adam Goldberg, Jennifer Carpenter	N/A
1,785	September 13, 2013	Seth Green	Andi Osho (Stand-up routine), Johnnyswim ("Don't Let It Get You Down")
1,786	September 16, 2013	Dianna Agron, Joel Stein	N/A
1,787	September 17, 2013	Queen Latifah, John Lloyd	Laura Mvula ("Green Garden")
1,788	September 18, 2013	Megan Mullally, Tommy Lasorda	N/A
1,789	September 19, 2013	Connie Britton, Aimee Garcia	N/A
1,790	September 20, 2013	Neil Patrick Harris	N/A
1,791	September 23, 2013	Jesse Tyler Ferguson, Taylor Schilling	N/A
1,792	September 24, 2013	Ray Romano, Carl Edwards	N/A
1,793	September 25, 2013	Julia Stiles, Keke Palmer	N/A
1,794	September 26, 2013	Joseph Gordon-Levitt, Maggie Grace	N/A
1,795	September 27, 2013	Julia Louis-Dreyfus	Phil Palisoul (Stand-up routine)
1,796	September 30, 2013	Simon Helberg	The Naked and Famous ("Hearts Like Ours")

=== October ===
No.	Original release date	Guest(s)	Musical/entertainment guest(s)
1,797	October 1, 2013	Patricia Heaton, Dennis Lehane	N/A
1,798	October 2, 2013	Ben Stein, Jayma Mays	N/A
1,799	October 3, 2013	Diane Kruger, Ken Jeong	N/A
1,800	October 4, 2013	Justin Long	Dave Stone (Stand-up Routine)
1,801	October 7, 2013	Zooey Deschanel, Ed Weeks	N/A
1,802	October 8, 2013	Sarah Michelle Gellar, Guillermo Díaz	N/A
1,803	October 9, 2013	Sean Hayes, Tom Cotter	N/A
1,804	October 10, 2013	Steven Wright, Ginnifer Goodwin	N/A
1,805	October 11, 2013	Rashida Jones, Brian McKim	N/A
1,806	October 14, 2013	Malin Akerman, Jo Nesbø	Vintage Trouble ("Pelvis Pusher")
1,807	October 15, 2013	Michael C. Hall, Laura Bell Bundy	N/A
1,808	October 16, 2013	Robin Williams	N/A
1,809	October 17, 2013	Allison Janney, Ben Schwartz	N/A
1,810	October 18, 2013	Rosie Perez	Nick Cobb (Stand-up Routine)
1,811	October 28, 2013	Katey Sagal, Richard Curtis	N/A
1,812	October 29, 2013	Alyssa Milano, Lawrence Block	N/A
1,813	October 30, 2013	Drew Carey, Pamela Silva Conde	N/A
1,814	October 31, 2013	Ben Kingsley, Anne Rice	N/A

=== November ===
No.	Original release date	Guest(s)	Musical/entertainment guest(s)
1,815	November 1, 2013	Geoffrey Rush	Dale Earnhardt Jr. Jr. ("If You Didn't See Me [Then You Weren't On The Dancefloor]")
1,816	November 4, 2013	Lauren Graham, Eugenio Derbez	N/A
1,817	November 5, 2013	Kevin Kline, Jenna Dewan	N/A
1,818	November 6, 2013	Martin Short, Doris Kearns Goodwin	N/A
1,819	November 7, 2013	Kat Dennings, Markus Persson	N/A
1,820	November 8, 2013	Mary Steenburgen, Becca Tobin	N/A
William Shatner appeared in the cold open.
1,821	November 11, 2013	LL Cool J, Carrie Keagan	N/A
1,822	November 12, 2013	Ron Perlman, Lupita Nyong'o	N/A
1,823	November 13, 2013	Kaley Cuoco, Kellie Pickler	N/A
1,824	November 14, 2013	Donald Sutherland, Casey Wilson	N/A
1,825	November 15, 2013	Steven Yeun, Summer Glau	N/A
1,826	November 18, 2013	Kunal Nayyar	N/A
1,827	November 19, 2013	Margaret Cho, Elettra Rossellini Wiedemann	N/A
1,828	November 20, 2013	Nikki Reed	Joe Zimmerman (Stand-up Routine)
1,829	November 21, 2013	David Arquette, Krysten Ritter	N/A
1,830	November 22, 2013	Tim Meadows, Helen Fielding	N/A
1,831	November 25, 2013	Mark Harmon, Wolfgang Puck	N/A
1,832	November 26, 2013	Angela Kinsey	American Authors
William Shatner appeared in the cold open.

=== December ===
No.	Original release date	Guest(s)	Musical/entertainment guest(s)
1,833	December 2, 2013	Betty White, Evangeline Lilly	Josh Blue
1,834	December 3, 2013	Will Arnett, Pau Gasol	N/A
1,835	December 4, 2013	Aisha Tyler, Bruce McCall	N/A
Ben Schwartz appeared in the cold open.
1,836	December 5, 2013	Anjelica Huston, Jackie Guerrido	N/A
1,837	December 6, 2013	Michael Ian Black, Chris Hardwick, Marc Maron, Zoe Saldaña, Mitch Albom	N/A
1,838	December 9, 2013	Demi Lovato	Louie Anderson
1,839	December 10, 2013	Paul Giamatti, Candice Accola	N/A
1,840	December 11, 2013	Jim Gaffigan, Ariel Tweto	N/A
1,841	December 12, 2013	Jason Schwartzman, Alexis Knapp	N/A
William Shatner appeared in the cold open.
1,842	December 13, 2013	Michael Sheen	The Lone Bellow
William Shatner appeared in the cold open.
1,843	December 16, 2013	Joe Theismann, Kelly Rowland	N/A
1,844	December 17, 2013	Alyssa Milano, Wilford Brimley	Wilford Brimley With The Jeff Hamilton Trio
1,845	December 18, 2013	Natasha Lyonne, Michael Connelly	Kellie Pickler
1,846	December 19, 2013	Cuba Gooding Jr., Emily Wickersham	N/A
1,847	December 20, 2013	Judd Apatow	Lissie
