= List of The Late Late Show with Craig Ferguson episodes (2011) =

Release
- Original network: CBS

Season chronology
- ← Previous; 2010 episodes Next → 2012 episodes

This is the list of episodes for The Late Late Show with Craig Ferguson in 2011.

== 2011 ==
No.	Original air date	Guest(s)	Musical/entertainment guest(s)
7-77	January 3, 2011	Lisa Kudrow	Matt Braunger
7-78	January 4, 2011	Julie Bowen, Carson Kressley	
7-79	January 5, 2011	Henry Winkler, Paula Deen	
7-80	January 6, 2011	Gary Sinise, Alex Kingston	
7-81	January 7, 2011	Mila Kunis	Geechy Guy
7-82	January 10, 2011	Roseanne Barr, Joe Theismann, Tuyen & Lisa in the cold open	
7-83	January 11, 2011	Paula Abdul	Dave Attell
7-84	January 12, 2011	David Duchovny, Jo Frost	
7-85	January 13, 2011	Denis Leary	Kathleen Madigan
7-86	January 14, 2011	Paul Giamatti, Piper Perabo	
7-87	January 17, 2011	Rashida Jones, Tony Goldwyn	
7-88	January 18, 2011	Larry King, Shannon Woodward	
7-89	January 19, 2011	Emily Deschanel	Rich Fulcher
7-90	January 20, 2011	Maria Bello, Dan Riskin	
7-91	January 21, 2011	Jeff Bridges, Melissa Rauch	
7-92	January 24, 2011	Valerie Bertinelli, Pau Gasol	
7-93	January 25, 2011	Jennifer Love Hewitt, Jon Lovitz	
7-94	January 26, 2011	Betty White, Ellie Kemper	
7-95	January 27, 2011	Adam Goldberg, Shannon Woodward	
7-96	January 28, 2011	Helena Bonham Carter	Larry Gatlin and the Gatlin Brothers
7-97	January 31, 2011	Rachael Ray	
7-98	February 1, 2011	Cornel West	George Clinton and P-Funk
7-99	February 2, 2011	Jim Parsons	
7-100	February 3, 2011	Matt LeBlanc, David Pogue	
7-101	February 4, 2011	Matt Lucas	
7-102	February 7, 2011	Gabrielle Union	Kurt Metzger
7-103	February 8, 2011	Emily Blunt, Kara Cooney	
7-104	February 9, 2011	Carl Reiner, Cat Cora	
7-105	February 10, 2011	Jennifer Beals, Jean-Michel Cousteau	
7-106	February 11, 2011	Jason Biggs, Jennifer Ouellette	
7-107	February 14, 2011	Bob Barker, Melissa Rauch	
7-108	February 15, 2011	William Shatner, Gillian Jacobs	
7-109	February 16, 2011	Joely Fisher	Matt Kirshen
7-110	February 17, 2011	Sarah Chalke	Louie Anderson
7-111	February 18, 2011	DJ Qualls, Lily Tomlin	
7-112	February 21, 2011	Wolf Blitzer, Sara Rue	
7-113	February 22, 2011	John Waters, Malin Åkerman	
7-114	February 23, 2011	Joel McHale	Greg Warren
7-115	February 24, 2011	Forest Whitaker, Teresa Palmer	
7-116	February 25, 2011	Malin Åkerman, Phil Keoghan	
7-117	February 28, 2011	Isaac Mizrahi, Patton Oswalt	
7-118	March 1, 2011	Carla Gugino, Tom Lennon	
7-119	March 2, 2011	Hugh Laurie, Ariel Tweto	
7-120	March 3, 2011	Neil Patrick Harris	Tomorrows Bad Seeds
7-121	March 4, 2011	Kathy Griffin, Wendy Booker	
7-122	March 7, 2011	Aaron Eckhart, Paula Poundstone	
7-123	March 8, 2011	Topher Grace, Catherine Deneuve	
7-124	March 9, 2011	Trace Adkins, Windell Middlebrooks	
7-125	March 10, 2011	Wanda Sykes, Kevin McKidd	
7-126	March 11, 2011	Amanda Peet	Phil Hanley
7-127	March 14, 2011	Lewis Black	Stackridge
7-128	March 15, 2011	Martha Stewart	
7-129	March 16, 2011	Seth Rogen, Brie Larson	
7-130	March 28, 2011	Bob Geldof	Far East Movement
7-131	March 29, 2011	Larry King, Dr. Sanjay Gupta	
7-132	March 30, 2011	Matthew McConaughey, Amy Smart	
7-133	March 31, 2011	Julie Chen, Jeffrey Tambor	
7-134	April 1, 2011	Paul Giamatti, Casey Wilson	
7-135	April 4, 2011	D. L. Hughley, Michelle Monaghan	
7-136	April 5, 2011	Jerry O'Connell, Sophia Bush	
7-137	April 6, 2011	Elliot Page	Marc Maron
7-138	April 7, 2011	Helen Hunt, Billy Gardell	
7-139	April 8, 2011	Zooey Deschanel, Chris Hardwick	
7-140	April 11, 2011	Isabella Rossellini, Casey Wilson	
7-141	April 12, 2011	Wynonna Judd, Ariel Tweto	
7-142	April 13, 2011	Ashley Judd, Evan Michelson	Maz Jobrani
7-143	April 14, 2011	Kristen Bell, Jason Aldean	
7-144	April 15, 2011	Robin Wright, Dan Riskin	
7-145	April 18, 2011	Tina Fey, Joe DeVito	Everest
7-146	April 19, 2011	Kathy Griffin, Derrick Pitts	
7-147	April 20, 2011	Michael Clarke Duncan, Lena Headey	
7-148	April 21, 2011	Alfred Molina	Joe DeVito
7-149	April 22, 2011	Diane Lane, Karen Gillan	
7-150	April 28, 2011	Tom Selleck, Odette Annable	
7-151	April 29, 2011	Bob Saget	Sharon Jones & the Dap-Kings
7-152	May 2, 2011	Mindy Kaling, Matt Lucas	
7-153	May 3, 2011	Geoffrey Rush	OK Go
7-154	May 4, 2011	John Waters, Pauley Perrette	
7-155	May 5, 2011	Juliette Lewis, Phil Rosenthal	
7-156	May 6, 2011	Will Ferrell	Reese Waters
7-157	May 9, 2011	Jeff Goldblum, Sarah Chalke	
7-158	May 10, 2011	Kenneth Branagh, Edward Conlon	
7-159	May 11, 2011	Tim Meadows, Colin Hay	
7-160	May 12, 2011	Mary Lynn Rajskub, Lawrence Block	Tim Minchin
7-161	May 13, 2011	Paul Reiser, Melissa McCarthy	
7-162	May 16, 2011	Simon Helberg, Geoff Peterson	
7-163	May 17, 2011	Patton Oswalt	
7-164	May 18, 2011	Julie Andrews	Little Big Town
7-165	May 19, 2011	Tony Shalhoub, Sloane Crosley	
7-166	May 20, 2011	Carrie Fisher, Edward Conlon	
7-167	May 23, 2011	Jack Black, Quinton Jackson	
7-168	May 24, 2011	Courteney Cox, Carrot Top	
7-169	May 25, 2011	Norm Macdonald, Julie McCarthy	Oh Land
7-170	May 26, 2011	Seth Green, Lance Burton	
7-171	May 27, 2011	Drew Carey, Rutina Wesley	Electric Barbarellas
7-172	May 30, 2011	Adam Goldberg, Lucy Punch	
7-173	May 31, 2011	Ray Romano, Lisa Masterson	
7-174	June 1, 2011	David Beckham, Alex Kingston	
7-175	June 2, 2011	Dick Van Dyke, Kristin Gore	
7-176	June 3, 2011	Carla Gugino, Rebel Wilson	
7-177	June 6, 2011	Don Cheadle, Brooklyn Decker	
7-178	June 7, 2011	Howie Mandel, Wendy Booker	The Goldberg Sister
7-179	June 8, 2011	Heather Graham, Chris Gorham	
7-180	June 9, 2011	Morgan Freeman, Carson Kressley	
7-181	June 10, 2011	Kevin Bacon, Wendy Williams	
7-182	June 27, 2011	Dennis Miller, Melissa Joan Hart	
7-183	June 28, 2011	Paris Hilton, Neil Gaiman	
7-184	June 29, 2011	Mary-Louise Parker	Dom Irrera
7-185	June 30, 2011	Henry Winkler, Mike Massimino	
7-186	July 1, 2011	Cedric the Entertainer, Moon Bloodgood	
7-187	July 5, 2011	Steven Wright, Ellie Kemper, Adam Savage	
7-188	July 6, 2011	Rosie Perez	
7-189	July 7, 2011	Thomas Lennon, Tatum O'Neal	
7-190	July 8, 2011	Larry King	Ziggy Marley
7-191	July 11, 2011	Elijah Wood, Cat Deeley	
7-192	July 12, 2011	Joely Fisher, Chris Hardwick	Joss Stone
7-193	July 13, 2011	DJ Qualls, Angela Kinsey	
7-194	July 14, 2011	Zooey Deschanel, Jim Cummings	
7-195	July 15, 2011	Tim Daly, Leslie Bibb	Foster the People
7-196	July 18, 2011	Elizabeth Banks, Rich Fulcher	
7-197	July 19, 2011	Eddie Izzard, Hayley Atwell	
7-198	July 20, 2011	Jenna Elfman, Breckin Meyer	Omid Djalili
7-199	July 21, 2011	Amos Lee, Bryan Cranston	
7-200	July 22, 2011	John Goodman, Jayma Mays	
7-201	July 25, 2011	Don Rickles	
7-202	July 26, 2011	William H. Macy, Karen Gillan	
7-203	July 27, 2011	Mary McCormack, David Feherty	
7-204	July 28, 2011	Lisa Kudrow, Ben Mezrich	
7-205	July 29, 2011	Tim Gunn, Matt Smith	Ted Alexandro
Le Late Late Show avec Craig Ferguson a Paris
7-206	August 1, 2011	Kristen Bell	
7-207	August 2, 2011	Kristen Bell, Eddie Izzard, Jean Reno	
7-208	August 3, 2011	Jean-Michel Cousteau, Kristen Bell, Jean Reno, Matt Smith	
7-209	August 4, 2011	Kristen Bell, Jean Reno	
7-210	August 5, 2011	Kristen Bell, Jean Reno	Moulin Rouge
8-01	August 22, 2011	Hugh Laurie, Saffron Burrows	
8-02	August 23, 2011	Lewis Black	Amos Lee
8-03	August 24, 2011	Regis Philbin	Marina Franklin
8-04	August 25, 2011	Kal Penn, Alice Eve	
8-05	August 26, 2011	Shirley Manson, Tory Belleci	
8-06	August 29, 2011	William Shatner, Bianca Kajlich	
8-07	August 30, 2011	Chi McBride, Ariel Tweto	
8-08	August 31, 2011	Leslie Bibb	Louie Anderson
8-09	September 1, 2011	Kathy Griffin, Lynette Rice	Lenka
8-10	September 2, 2011	Lindsay Sloane, Peter Krause	
8-11	September 5, 2011	Julie Chen, Annie Duke	
8-12	September 6, 2011	Lisa Kudrow, Richard Engel	
8-13	September 7, 2011	James Marsden, Wolfgang Puck	
8-14	September 8, 2011	Tim Meadows, Bill Bailey	
8-15	September 9, 2011	Alfred Molina, Brie Larson	
8-16	September 13, 2011	Lauren Graham	
8-17	September 14, 2011	Danny DeVito, Olivia Munn	Moulin Rouge
8-18	September 15, 2011	Sigourney Weaver, Ted Alexandro	
8-19	September 16, 2011	James Woods	
8-20	September 19, 2011	Keith Olbermann, Kelly Macdonald	
8-21	September 20, 2011	Harry Connick Jr., Kathryn Hahn	
8-22	September 21, 2011	James Spader, Juno Temple	
8-23	September 22, 2011	Chris Hardwick, Billy Gardell	
8-24	September 23, 2011	Gerard Butler, Kat Dennings	
8-25	September 26, 2011	Jonah Hill	Chris Young
8-26	September 27, 2011	Mary Lynn Rajskub, Jackie Collins	Trombone Shorty
8-27	September 28, 2011	Rashida Jones, Jonathan Ames	
8-28	September 29, 2011	Carson Kressley, Michelle Monaghan	
8-29	September 30, 2011	Seth Rogen, Judy Greer	
8-30	October 3, 2011	Lily Tomlin, Ioan Gruffudd	
8-31	October 4, 2011	Jessica Lange, Jacques Steinberg	
8-32	October 5, 2011	Joel McHale, Elizabeth Cook	
8-33	October 6, 2011	Evangeline Lilly, Dan Riskin	
8-34	October 7, 2011	Jason Schwartzman, Eliza Coupe	
8-35	October 10, 2011	Claire Danes	
8-36	October 11, 2011	Steven Wright, Monica Potter	
8-37	October 12, 2011	Jim Parsons	Cake
8-38	October 13, 2011	Kathy Bates, Anthony Head	
8-39	October 14, 2011	Liza Minnelli, Adam Pally	
8-40	October 17, 2011	Matt Smith, Joel Schumacher	
8-41	October 18, 2011	Carey Mulligan, Paula Poundstone	
8-42	October 19, 2011	Carla Gugino, Joe Matarese	
8-43	October 20, 2011	Tom Lennon, Sarah Paulson	
8-44	October 21, 2011	Jeffrey Tambor, Laura Jansen	Cory Kahaney
8-45	October 27, 2011	Kunal Nayyar	
8-46	October 28, 2011	Olivia Munn, Judy Gold	Duran Duran
8-47	October 31, 2011	Zooey Deschanel, Neil Gaiman	Amanda Palmer
8-48	November 1, 2011	Maria Bello, Jake Johnson	
8-49	November 2, 2011	Ted Danson, Bitsie Tulloch	
8-50	November 3, 2011	Alan Alda, Ariel Tweto	
8-51	November 4, 2011	Neil Patrick Harris	Imelda May
8-52	November 7, 2011	Jeffrey Dean Morgan featuring Alfred Molina as Geoff Peterson	The Grascals
8-53	November 8, 2011	Jennifer Tilly, Lawrence Block featuring Dominic Monaghan as Geoff Peterson	
8-54	November 9, 2011	Ellen Barkin, Dave Attell featuring Thomas Lennon as Geoff Peterson	
8-55	November 10, 2011	Molly Shannon, Michael K. Williams featuring Larry King as Geoff Peterson	
8-56	November 11, 2011	Drew Carey, Linda Cunningham featuring Louie Anderson as Geoff Peterson	
8-57	November 14, 2011	Poppy Montgomery, Charlie Higson featuring Lauren Graham as Geoff Peterson	
8-58	November 15, 2011	Ewan McGregor featuring Paula Poundstone as Geoff Peterson	
8-59	November 16, 2011	Michael Ian Black, Alex Kingston featuring Angela Kinsey as Geoff Peterson	
8-60	November 17, 2011	Robin Williams featuring Jason Schwartzman as Geoff Peterson	
8-61	November 18, 2011	Don Rickles, Beth Behrs featuring Shadoe Stevens as Geoff Peterson	
8-62	November 21, 2011	Robin Williams, Johnny Galecki	
8-63	November 22, 2011	Jason Segel, Eliza Coupe	
8-64	November 23, 2011	Ty Burrell, Wilford Brimley	
8-65	November 28, 2011	Aisha Tyler featuring Thomas Lennon as Geoff Peterson	Justin Moore
8-66	November 29, 2011	Margaret Cho, Michael Connelly featuring Thomas Lennon as Geoff Peterson	
8-67	November 30, 2011	David Sedaris, Jeff Cesario featuring Thomas Lennon as Geoff Peterson	
8-68	December 1, 2011	Kristin Chenoweth, Ken Tucker	
8-69	December 2, 2011	Ana Gasteyer, Beth Behrs	
8-70	December 5, 2011	Justin Long, Noomi Rapace	
8-71	December 6, 2011	Valerie Bertinelli	Henry Cho
8-72	December 7, 2011	Trace Adkins	Michael Palascak
8-73	December 8, 2011	Pierce Brosnan, Laura Lippman	
8-74	December 9, 2011	Richard Lewis	Needtobreathe
8-75	December 12, 2011	DJ Qualls, Cat Cora	
8-76	December 13, 2011	Ben Kingsley, Morena Baccarin	
8-77	December 14, 2011	Kenneth Branagh, Patton Oswalt	
8-78	December 15, 2011	Sean Hayes, John Hodgman	
8-79	December 16, 2011	Mindy Kaling, Nick Griffin	
8-80	December 19, 2011	Regis Philbin featuring Thomas Lennon as Geoff Peterson	Goo Goo Dolls
8-81	December 20, 2011	Robin Wright, Parker Young	
8-82	December 21, 2011	Jason Lee, Felicity Jones	Black Dub
8-83	December 22, 2011	Kyra Sedgwick	Frankie Ballard
8-84	December 23, 2011	Jason Segel, Johnny Galecki	
