= Drew Thomas =

American comedian (born 1971/72)

- Born: 1971 or 1972 (age 54–55)
- Education: Georgia Perimeter College; Kennesaw State University

Comedy career
- Medium: Stand-up; television
- Subjects: Relationship issues; recent news; everyday life
- Website: www.comeseedrew.com

Drew Thomas (born 1971 or 1972) is an American comedian. Born in Jamaica, Thomas immigrated to New York when he was nine years old and was raised in The Bronx. He received degrees in theater from Georgia Perimeter College and Kennesaw State University. Right before becoming a comedian, he worked as a car salesman for about half a decade at an Atlanta car dealership. At the beginning of his comedy career, he won two comedy competitions, and the magazine Creative Loafing named him the best local comedian in 2006.

Thomas hosted the open mic session Phat Comedy Showcase at Twisted Taco and Funny Farm Comedy Club in 2008. For three years, he opened for the comedian Rodney Carrington's Laughter's Good tour. He opened for numerous singers and musical groups. Thomas is a frequent headliner at The Comedy & Magic Club in Hermosa Beach, California, and Brad Garrett's Comedy Club in MGM Grand Las Vegas. He made his television debut on a Robert Townsend comedy special, Partners in Crime, in 2006. Thomas' other television appearances include season 6 in 2008 and season 9 in 2015 of the Last Comic Standing, The Late Late Show with Craig Ferguson in 2010, and the Fox television show Laughs in 2016. His comedy material focuses on relationship issues, recent news, and everyday life.

== Early life and early career ==
Born in 1971 or 1972, Drew Thomas was raised in Kingston, Jamaica. When he was nine years old, Thomas immigrated to New York alongside his family. He grew up in The Bronx and received a theater degree from Georgia Perimeter College. Before seeking to become a comedian, Thomas was a car salesman for Toyota vehicles at an Atlanta dealership for five or six years.

Thomas cited several influences for becoming a comedian. While growing up in Jamaica, he watched British television shows, saying it was all that was available on television. Thomas said he enjoys irony and the dry humor in British humor. He cited his father, a person with a good sense of humor, who performed at weddings. Another inspiration was a comedy album by Eddie Murphy. Thomas called Dave Chappelle his favorite comedian, saying Chappelle "is fearless, a great writer and will explore a topic beyond what a normal performer will". Once he committed to pursuing comedy professionally, Thomas began studying at the Kennesaw State University, where he received a theater degree, his second college degree.

== Career ==
At the beginning of his comedy career, Thomas won two comedy competitions and subsequently became a frequent performer at the Atlanta-based Punch Line Club. The arts and culture magazine Creative Loafing selected him as the best local comedian in 2006. In giving him the award, the magazine said, "With his quick wit and smooth delivery, Drew Thomas has become a force in Atlanta's comedy scene." When he received the award, Thomas had performed with the comedians Bill Bellamy, Bill Burr, D. L. Hughley, Aries Spears, and Ron White during tours.

Thomas in 2007 typically hosted Twisted Taco's Phat Comedy Showcase, an open mic session where between six and eight hopeful comedians would perform for five minutes. In 2008, Thomas was the host of the Phat Comedy Showcase put on at Twisted Taco on Tuesdays and at Funny Farm Comedy Club on Wednesdays. He spent the following four days of the week traveling to various places to perform comedy. He entertained at many clubs and had entertained at more than 75 colleges and universities by 2019. His work at Phat Comedy assisted in launching the careers of himself and numerous fellow stand-up comedians.

For the comedian Rodney Carrington's Laughter's Good tour, Thomas was the opener for three years. He performed at the numerous American and Canadian arenas, casinos, and theaters at which the tour was held. He was the opening act for the singers Morris Day, Al Green, Tito Jackson, Chaka Khan, MC Hammer, Jeffrey Osborne and the musical groups Boyz II Men, The Isley Brothers, Salt-N-Pepa, and The Temptations. Thomas had a residency at Chumash Casino Resort in 2015 called Drew's Comedy Club. During an opening that year for Salt-N-Pepa at the Chumash Casino Resort, he greeted tardy arrivals with a mocking introduction. Observing that the audience enjoyed his performance, Noozhawk's L. Paul Mann called Thomas "a fitting opening act".

Thomas performed in Jamaica for International Comedy Fest in 2007, Come Mek We Laugh in 2010, and the Johnny Live Comedy Bar Special in 2019 at the Hope Botanical Gardens's Shell Bandstand venue. During his 2010 performance in Jamaica, he discussed relationships, Jamaican restaurants, and United States–based Jamaican mechanics in a showing that The Gleaner's Marcia Rowe called "hilarious". He is a frequent headliner at The Comedy & Magic Club in Hermosa Beach, California, and Brad Garrett's Comedy Club in MGM Grand Las Vegas. Thomas performed on the Cirque du Soleil Las Vegas show Mad Apple at the New York-New York Hotel and Casino between July and August 2025. KTNV-TV said he "delivers big laughs" and "his sharp wit and NYC swagger fit right into the Big Apple-themed spectacle".

== Comedy material ==
Thomas' comedy material discusses relationship issues, recent news, and everyday life. He examines life's natural contrasts such as "Evil Drew" against "Good Drew", the contrasts between black people and white people, and the comparison of what men and women go through. Thomas relates a joke that contrasts how men and women view getting married in which women are overjoyed while men are not. He starts the joke by saying, "When men talk about marriage to our friends, it sounds like something you get diagnosed with." In another joke, he is dating a single mother. Having met her only twice, he said "the school called me to come pick up her son. You can't put my name on the list to come pick up your son. I only seen this dude two times in the dark at your house." He directly engages the audience, frequently mocking the attire of people sitting near the stage.

== Television career ==
Around 2006, Thomas made his television debut for a Robert Townsend comedy special, Partners in Crime, that aired on the Black Family Channel. He did a special for Great American Pure Flix's show Comedy All Stars. Thomas competed on two seasons of the NBC show Last Comic Standing, season 6 in 2008 and season 9 in 2015. He reached the show's finals. Thomas performed on The Late Late Show with Craig Ferguson in 2010. He made comedy series at the Chumash Casino Resort and Morongo Casino, Resort & Spa. He appeared on the Fox television show Laughs in 2016.

== Reception ==
Writing for Creative Loafing Charlotte, Anita Overcash found that "his personal stories — centering in on everything from random occurrences to past relationships — are funny enough to make crowds laugh out loud." The Chattanooga Times Free Press said in 2018 that as Thomas discusses his relationship issues, recent news, and everyday life, Thomas captivates his viewers. According to the newspaper, "His quick wit and smooth delivery are the perfect combination for laughing out loud." Yasmine Peru of The Gleaner said in 2019 that Thomas is "known for his face-hurting laughter, his keen retorts on everyday life, his quick wit and smooth delivery" as he shares the misunderstandings and missteps in his relationships.
