= List of The Late Late Show with Craig Ferguson episodes (2010) =

Release
- Original network: CBS

Season chronology
- ← Previous; 2009 episodes Next → 2011 episodes

This is the list of episodes for The Late Late Show with Craig Ferguson in 2010.

== 2010 ==
No.	Original air date	Guest(s)	Musical/entertainment guest(s)
6-72	January 4, 2010	Rosie Perez	Switchfoot
6-73	January 5, 2010	Patricia Heaton, Carey Mulligan	Yonder Mountain String Band
6-74	January 6, 2010	Ray Romano, Herb Alpert	Lani Hall
6-75	January 7, 2010	Steven Wright, Michelle Monaghan	
6-76	January 8, 2010	Jason Segel, Shiri Appleby	
6-77	January 11, 2010	Mila Kunis	Nellie McKay
6-78	January 12, 2010	Carey Mulligan, Paula Poundstone	
6-79	January 13, 2010	Richard Lewis, Amber Valletta	
6-80	January 14, 2010	Julie Andrews, Amber Valletta	Vampire Weekend
6-81	January 15, 2010	Thomas Lennon, Shiri Appleby	Luke Bryan
6-82	January 18, 2010	Marion Cotillard, Steve Jones	The Hotrats
6-83	January 19, 2010	Alan Alda, Anna Kendrick	
6-84	January 20, 2010	Keri Russell, Jake Johannsen	
6-85	January 21, 2010	Adam Goldberg, Abbie Cornish	
6-86	January 22, 2010	Grant Imahara, Tory Belleci, Kari Byron	The Hotrats
6-87	January 25, 2010	Carl Reiner, Alicia Witt	
6-88	January 26, 2010	50 Cent, Adrianne Palicki	
6-89	January 27, 2010	Eddie Izzard, Myron Mixon	
6-90	January 28, 2010	Rosie O'Donnell	Wilco
6-91	January 29, 2010	Jon Heder	Dana Eagle, Corinne Bailey Rae
6-92	February 4, 2010	Tina Brown, Chris Kattan	
6-93	February 5, 2010	Jill Scott, Claire Danes	
6-94	February 8, 2010	Pierce Brosnan, Patty Griffin	
6-95	February 9, 2010	Donald Glover, Carrie Fisher	
6-96	February 10, 2010	Gabourey Sidibe, Jeff Stilson	OK Go
6-97	February 11, 2010	Don Rickles, Sonya Walger	
6-98	February 12, 2010	Carey Mulligan	David Nail
6-99	February 15, 2010	Colin Firth, Amanda Righetti	
6-100	February 16, 2010	Matt Lucas	Your Lips Your Lips
6-101	February 17, 2010	Ben McKenzie, Helena Bonham Carter	
6-102	February 18, 2010	Jennifer Tilly, Jimmie Johnson	
6-103	February 19, 2010	Peter Sagal, Topher Grace	
6-104	February 22, 2010	Tom Everett Scott, Parker Posey	
6-105	February 23, 2010	Stephen Fry	
6-106	February 24, 2010	Don Cheadle, Tim Meadows, Jeannette Walls	
6-107	February 25, 2010	Eddie Izzard, Seann William Scott, Jackie Collins	
6-108	February 26, 2010	Quentin Tarantino	Mumford & Sons
6-109	March 1, 2010	Simon Helberg, Lauren Graham	
6-110	March 2, 2010	Steven Wright, Mitch Albom	Mumiy Troll
6-111	March 3, 2010	Michael Sheen, Amy Ryan	
6-112	March 4, 2010	Jeffrey Tambor, Sonya Walger	Regina Spektor
6-113	March 5, 2010	Dax Shepard, Paula Deen	
6-114	March 8, 2010	Isaac Mizrahi, Miranda Lambert	
6-115	March 9, 2010	Lisa Kudrow, Adhir Kalyan	
6-116	March 10, 2010	Dominic Monaghan, Lindsay Sloane	The Temper Trap
6-117	March 11, 2010	Lisa Kudrow, Ryan Bingham	
6-118	March 12, 2010	George Hamilton, Mike Massimino	
6-119	March 22, 2010	John Cusack, Lana Parrilla	
6-120	March 23, 2010	Jay Baruchel, Regis Philbin	Regis and Joy Philbin
6-121	March 24, 2010	Jonah Hill, Emily Procter	V V Brown
6-122	March 29, 2010	Joel McHale, Ben McKenzie	
6-123	March 30, 2010	Grant Imahara, Ben McKenzie	V V Brown
6-124	March 31, 2010	Wanda Sykes, Anna Torv	
6-125	April 1, 2010	Robin Williams, Jonathan Dancy	
6-126	April 2, 2010	John Corbett	Joss Stone
6-127	April 5, 2010	Kristen Bell, Grant Imahara (Geoff Peterson's debut)	
6-128	April 6, 2010	Mindy Kaling, Dom Irrera	
6-129	April 7, 2010	Raquel Welch, Anna Torv	Brian McFadden
6-130	April 8, 2010	Jennifer Love Hewitt, Stuart Neville	
6-131	April 9, 2010	Betty White, Kunal Nayyar	
6-132	April 12, 2010	Tim Gunn, Kathy Kinney	
6-133	April 13, 2010	James Marsden, Charlyne Yi	
6-134	April 14, 2010	Andie MacDowell, Dario Franchitti	Dawes
6-135	April 15, 2010	Kirstie Alley	Sade
6-136	April 16, 2010	Ellie Kemper, Willie Nelson	Willie Nelson
6-137	April 19, 2010	Brendan Fraser, Amanda Righetti	Brian Scott McFadden
6-138	April 20, 2010	Emily Mortimer, Miranda Lambert	Randy Kagan
6-139	April 21, 2010	Brooke Shields, George Wallace	Corinne Bailey Rae
6-140	April 22, 2010	Jeffrey Dean Morgan, Busy Philipps	
6-141	April 23, 2010	Drew Carey	Jason Aldean
6-142	April 29, 2010	Tom Selleck, Lance Burton	
6-143	April 30, 2010	Peter Segal	
6-144	May 3, 2010	Morgan Freeman, Kate Mara	
6-145	May 4, 2010	Andy García, Donald Glover	
6-146	May 5, 2010	Scarlett Johansson	
6-147	May 6, 2010	Mark Harmon, Sophia Bush	Local Natives
6-148	May 7, 2010	Seth MacFarlane	Matt Baetz
6-149	May 10, 2010	Russell Crowe	Wilco
6-150	May 11, 2010	Melina Kanakaredes, Tom Lennon	Jónsi
6-151	May 12, 2010	Bryan Cranston, Angela Kinsey	
6-152	May 13, 2010	Robert Downey Jr., Dave Barry	
6-153	May 14, 2010	Amanda Seyfried, Isabel Allende	
6-154	May 18, 2010	Jon Favreau	Jakob Dylan
6-155	May 19, 2010	Dennis Quaid, Alice Eve	
6-156	May 20, 2010	Holly Hunter	The Hold Steady
6-157	May 21, 2010	Ben Kingsley	Court Yard Hounds
6-158	May 24, 2010	Ben Stein	Mishka, Craig Shoemaker
6-159	May 25, 2010	Kristin Davis, Judd Apatow	
6-160	May 26, 2010	Antonio Banderas, Paula Poundstone	
6-161	May 27, 2010	Michael Sheen	Band of Horses
6-162	May 28, 2010	Shirley Manson, Jeffrey Ross	The National
6-163	June 2, 2010	Evangeline Lilly, Charlyne Yi	LaRaf
6-164	June 3, 2010	Adam Goldberg, Jamy Ian Smith	Jeff Stilson
6-165	June 4, 2010	Jennifer Tilly, Ed Alonzo	
6-166	June 7, 2010	Eric Idle, Terry Crews	
6-167	June 8, 2010	John Waters, Taraji P. Henson	
6-168	June 9, 2010	Kyra Sedgwick, Tom Felton	
6-169	June 10, 2010	Wolfgang Puck	Damian Marley and Nas
6-170	June 11, 2010	Denis Leary	John Novosad
6-171	June 14, 2010	Bradley Whitford	Shelby Lynne, Jeff Stilson
6-172	June 15, 2010	Ice Cube, Stan Lee	Tig Notaro
6-173	June 16, 2010	Tim Allen	
6-174	June 17, 2010	Virginia Madsen, Chris Hardwick	Justin Currie
6-175	June 18, 2010	Mark Ruffalo, Saffron Burrows	
6-176	June 21, 2010	Maria Bello, DJ Qualls	
6-177	June 22, 2010	Valerie Bertinelli, Jerry Ferrara	
6-178	June 23, 2010	Julia Ormond, José Andrés	
6-179	June 24, 2010	Lisa Kudrow, James Dyson	Robert David Hall
6-180	June 25, 2010	Tim Meadows, Jean-Michel Cousteau	
6-181	June 28, 2010	Howie Mandel, Jane Adams	
6-182	June 29, 2010	Carl Reiner, Rebecca Mader	Sharon Jones & the Dap-Kings
6-183	June 30, 2010	Mindy Kaling, Myron Mixon	
6-184	July 1, 2010	Kathy Griffin, Michael Vartan	Alicia Witt
6-185	July 2, 2010	Dennis Eckersley	Dr. Dog
6-186	July 12, 2010	Julie Chen, Michael Ian Black	Dierks Bentley
6-187	July 13, 2010	Marion Cotillard	Louie Anderson
6-188	July 14, 2010	Alfred Molina, Cathy Ladman	
6-189	July 15, 2010	Nicolas Cage	Marina and the Diamonds
6-190	July 16, 2010	Elliot Page	
6-191	July 19, 2010	Jeffrey Dean Morgan, Mary Lynn Rajskub	
6-192	July 20, 2010	America Ferrera, Dan Riskin	
6-193	July 21, 2010	Ted Danson, Kevin Pollak	
6-194	July 22, 2010	Michael Clarke Duncan, Daniela Ruah	
6-195	July 23, 2010	Paulina Porizkova	MGMT
6-196	July 26, 2010	Steve Carell	She & Him
6-197	July 27, 2010	Morgan Freeman	The Black Keys
6-198	July 28, 2010	Carrie Fisher, Ron Livingston	
6-199	July 29, 2010	Neil Patrick Harris, Dr. Sanjay Gupta	
6-200	July 30, 2010	Mary Lynn Rajskub, Christopher Gorham	
6-201	August 2, 2010	George Hamilton	Fred MacAulay
6-202	August 3, 2010	Jeffrey Tambor	Drew Thomas
6-203	August 4, 2010	Julie Chen, Paula Poundstone	
6-204	August 5, 2010	Paris Hilton, Alex Dryden	
6-205	August 6, 2010	Mark Wahlberg, Jacinda Barrett	
6-206	August 9, 2010	Lindsay Sloane	Vampire Weekend
6-207	August 10, 2010	David Duchovny, Dave Barry	
6-208	August 11, 2010	Maggie Gyllenhaal	
6-209	August 12, 2010	Emma Thompson	Carlos Alazraqui
6-210	August 13, 2010	Anna Kendrick	
7-1	August 30, 2010	Adam Goldberg	Chief
7-2	August 31, 2010	Don Johnson, Laura Lippman	
7-3	September 1, 2010	Rachael Ray, William Knoedelseder	
7-4	September 2, 2010	Billy Gardell	Sara Watkins
7-5	September 3, 2010	Brooke Shields	
7-06	September 6, 2010	John Larroquette, Malin Åkerman	
7-07	September 7, 2010	Chris Kattan, Rob Stewart	
7-08	September 8, 2010	James Lipton, Monica Potter	
7-09	September 9, 2010	Rashida Jones, Dr. Mehmet Oz	Blake Shelton
7-10	September 10, 2010	Donald Glover, Katey Sagal	Norah Jones
7-11	September 13, 2010	Philip Seymour Hoffman, Ellie Kemper	
7-12	September 14, 2010	Kristen Bell	Sarah McLachlan
7-13	September 15, 2010	Don Rickles, Ellie Kemper	
7-14	September 16, 2010	William Shatner, Sloane Crosley	
7-15	September 17, 2010	Tim Gunn, Jennifer Finnigan	
7-16	September 20, 2010	Mindy Kaling, Steve Hartman	
7-17	September 21, 2010	Patricia Heaton, Adam Brody	Sara Bareilles
7-18	September 22, 2010	Johnny Galecki, Jim Parsons, Kaley Cuoco, Simon Helberg	
7-19	September 23, 2010	Jon Hamm, Jonathan Ames	
7-20	September 24, 2010	John Schwartzman, Willie Nelson	Willie Nelson
7-21	September 27, 2010	Sela Ward, Guillermo del Toro	
7-22	September 28, 2010	David Boreanaz, Melissa McCarthy	
7-23	September 29, 2010	Steven Wright, Sloane Crosley	Blake Shelton
7-24	September 30, 2010	Edward Norton, Odette Yustman	
7-25	October 1, 2010	Carey Mulligan	Marc Maron
7-26	October 4, 2012	Lauren Graham	Rosanne Cash
7-27	October 5, 2010	Alfred Molina	Cory Kahaney
7-28	October 6, 2010	Debra Winger, Adhir Kalyan	Julie Gribble
7-29	October 7, 2010	Toby Keith	Louie Anderson
7-30	October 8, 2010	Mary Lynn Rajskub, Carl Edwards	
7-31	October 11, 2010	John Malkovich	Henry Cho
7-32	October 12, 2010	Derrick Pitts, Trace Adkins	Trace Adkins
7-33	October 13, 2010	Minnie Driver, Diedrich Bader	
7-34	October 14, 2010	Drew Carey, Jenny Wade	
7-35	October 15, 2010	Julie Chen, Ty Burrell	Billy Currington
7-36	October 25, 2010	Condoleezza Rice, Joe Theismann	
7-37	October 26, 2010	Danny DeVito, Brie Larson	Henry Cho
7-38	October 27, 2010	Marg Helgenberger, Donald Glover	
7-39	October 28, 2010	Michael Caine	
7-40	October 29, 2010	Jason Segel, Alison Brie	Adam Hills
7-41	November 1, 2010	Tyler Perry, Sophia Bush	
7-42	November 3, 2010	Lewis Black, Jayma Mays	Dr. Dog
7-43	November 4, 2010	Dick Van Dyke, Kerry Washington	
7-44	November 5, 2010	Juliette Lewis, Cornel West	
7-45	November 8, 2010	Tom Selleck	Myq Kaplan
7-46	November 9, 2010	Cheryl Hines, Wolfgang Puck	
7-47	November 10, 2010	Tim Meadows, Stan Lee	
7-48	November 11, 2010	Rosie Perez, Quinton Jackson	
7-49	November 12, 2010	Carrie Ann Inaba	Bettye LaVette
7-50	November 15, 2010	Dennis Miller, Bianca Kajlich	
7-51	November 16, 2010	Chris Hardwick, Matt Smith	
7-52	November 17, 2010	Russell Crowe	
7-53	November 18, 2010	Jeff Goldblum	
7-54	November 19, 2010	Amy Sedaris, Adam Savage, Jamie Hyneman	
7-55	November 22, 2010	Ben Stein, Dr. Lisa Masterson	The Very Best
7-56	November 23, 2010	Mark Ruffalo, Kathryn Hahn	
7-57	November 24, 2010	Dwayne Johnson, Paula Deen	
7-58	November 29, 2010	Michael Sheen	
7-59	November 30, 2010	DJ Qualls, Salman Rushdie	
7-60	December 1, 2010	Regis Philbin	Wendy Liebman
7-61	December 2, 2010	Cedric the Entertainer, Chris Hardwick	Norah Jones
7-62	December 3, 2010	Kristen Bell	Michael Franti and Spearhead
7-63	December 6, 2010	Katie Couric	Al Madrigal
7-64	December 7, 2010	Carrie Fisher, Dennis Lehane	
7-65	December 8, 2010	Russell Brand, Richard Wolffe	
7-66	December 9, 2010	Lucy Liu, Jody Williams	
7-67	December 10, 2010	Neil Patrick Harris	Nellie McKay
7-68	December 13, 2010	Tom Arnold, Alison Becker	
7-69	December 14, 2010	Kirsten Dunst	Greg Proops
7-70	December 15, 2010	Nick Lachey	Jamy Ian Swiss
7-71	December 16, 2010	Seth Green, Lena Dunham	
7-72	December 17, 2010	Billy Connolly, Maria Bamford	
7-73	December 20, 2010	Kristin Davis, Dick Cavett	
7-74	December 21, 2010	Jane Fonda, Grant Imahara	
7-75	December 22, 2010	Michael Clarke Duncan, Grant Imahara	
7-76	December 23, 2010	Kathy Griffin	Ruth Gerson
