= Georgia State University Perimeter College =

College in Atlanta, Georgia

- New logo (2016) to reflect name change and merger with Georgia State University.
- Former names: DeKalb College; DeKalb Community College; Georgia Perimeter College; Perimeter College at Georgia State University
- Type: Public college
- Established: 1964
- Founder: Jim Cherry
- Parent institution: Georgia State University
- Dean: Barbara J. Johnson
- Academic staff: 361 full-time faculty, 212 part-time faculty (fall 2024)
- Students: 17,437 (fall 2024)
- Location: Suburban Atlanta, Georgia, United States; 33°47′33.9″N 84°14′5.9″W
- Campus: Suburb, 50 acres (0.20 km^{2})
- Nickname: Panthers
- Mascot: Pounce the Blue Panther
- Website: perimeter.gsu.edu

Former Georgia Perimeter College logo prior to the 2016 merger with Georgia State University.

Georgia State University Perimeter College (formerly Perimeter College at Georgia State University is a college of Georgia State University, a public research university in Atlanta, Georgia. Georgia Perimeter College was originally a public community college founded by an Atlanta area county board of education before merging with Georgia State University in 2016 to create one of the largest universities in the United States with over 50,000 students. The Perimeter College (PC) campuses became components of Georgia State University, still maintaining their own mission, degrees, and admittance requirements, separate from those of the main campus. Before merging with GSU, PC served metro Atlanta with five campus locations and offered more than 40 programs of study, including Arts, Music, Theatre, Nursing, Business Administration, Education, Dental Hygiene, Criminal Justice, and Sign Language Interpreting.

== History ==
Perimeter College was founded by the DeKalb County Board of Education as DeKalb College in 1958 and offered its first classes in Clarkston, Georgia, in 1964. Its service area grew as new campuses opened and students came to the college from throughout the metro area. In 1997, DeKalb College was renamed Georgia Perimeter College. It was called Georgia Perimeter College, as a two-year associate degree-granting unit of the University System of Georgia until January 6, 2016.

== Campuses ==
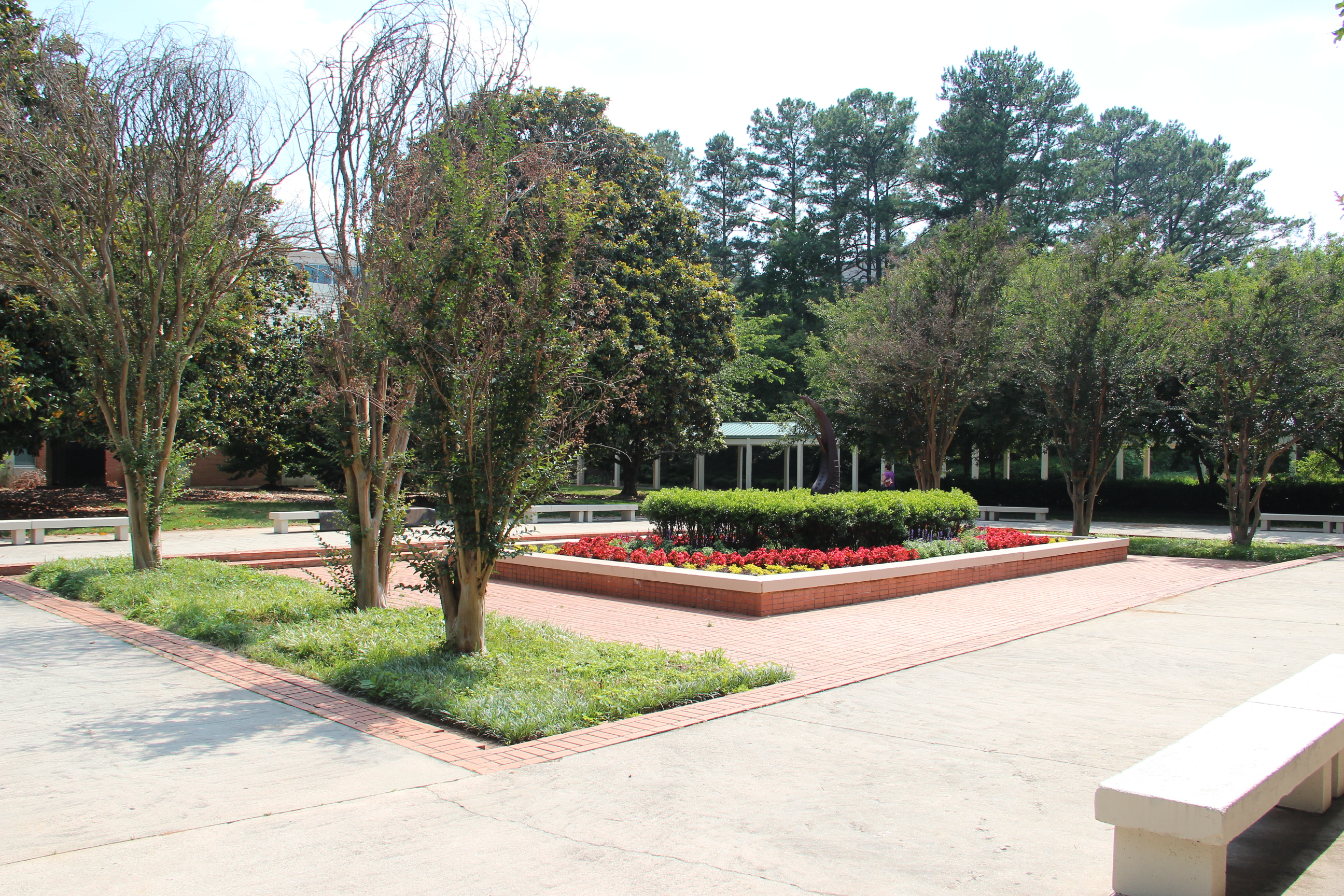
Clarkston Campus

- Three in DeKalb County:
  - Clarkston Campus (formerly known as "Central Campus"), in an unincorporated area south of Clarkston, is the original campus.
  - Decatur Campus (formerly known as "South Campus"), in an unincorporated area south of Decatur.
  - Dunwoody Campus (formerly known as "North Campus"), in Dunwoody Home to an observatory that is available for public use.
- Newton County: Newton Campus, in an unincorporated area, south of I-20 and east of Covington.
- Fulton County: Alpharetta Center, in Alpharetta in north Fulton County.

The Perimeter College Botanical Gardens include a Native Plant Garden and the Ferns of the World Garden, which contains more species of ferns than any other garden in the United States. Discussions about plants, garden walks and special sales are open to the public.

== Academics ==
Perimeter College was the largest two-year college and the fourth-largest institution in the University System of Georgia, with about 21,371 students enrolled. PC's online program was the largest in the state university system, serving over 9,000 students. Perimeter College transferred almost 3,000 students annually to bachelor's degree programs within the University System of Georgia, accounting for one-fifth of transfers within the system. To allow students to transfer to four-year institutions of their choice, Perimeter pioneered a Transfer Admission Guarantee (TAG) program, signing more than 40 TAG agreements with in-state, out-of-state, public and private four-year colleges and universities.

More than one-third of Perimeter College's faculty members earned their doctorate; this statistic did not include numerous part-time instructors. PC had more Governor's Teaching Fellows than any other institution in Georgia: 40 since 1996. More than 46 PC faculty members received National Institute for Staff and Organizational Development Teaching Excellence Awards since 2003.

The 3-year graduation rate was 7% before amalgamation with Georgia State University.

In 2024, Perimeter College at Georgia State University was the winner of the National Science Foundation's Community College Innovation Challenge.

== Military outreach ==
Perimeter College's Military Outreach program served one of the largest military and veteran populations in the State, with over 1,100 military-affiliated students attending PC each semester. Designated year after year as a Military Friendly and Best-For-Vets institution, PC's Military Outreach program had been recognized as a model in the State and across the Nation. The Military Outreach Center provided all the services, support and assistance student veterans need to reach their academic goals. PC had Military Outreach Centers located on all five campuses and provide personalized assistance to its many Online student veterans, offering everything from academic and financial aid counseling, to scholarships and emergency grants for military/veteran students and their families. PC honored its student veterans by Serving Those Who Have Served.

== Student life ==
Perimeter College's Fine Arts program presented plays, art exhibits and musical performances that were open to the public. The 2009–2010 season included more than 100 events. The college was also home to the DeKalb Symphony Orchestra and the Southern Academy for Literary Arts & Scholarly Research, which celebrated literature and scholarship and hosts an assortment of visiting writers who engage students, faculty, and staff. The Chattahoochee Review was the nationally recognized literary magazine published by the college. Teresa Weaver of Atlanta Magazine described it as a "fine literary journal". It received attention as a journal of Southern literature, featuring such writers as James Dickey, but expanded its scope to include international works.

In early 2010, Perimeter College opened the Atlanta Center for Civic Engagement & Service Learning on its Clarkston Campus. The center worked to enhance student learning by providing opportunities for students to apply what they learn into the classroom to real-life situations. Through such activities, they worked to enhance the economic, social and cultural vitality of PC's communities, while offering students, faculty, educators and community members the training, tools and support they needed to get engaged and make a difference.

=== Media ===
The Collegian was the student newspaper of Perimeter College. The paper was published to over 11,000 people all over the metro Atlanta area. The Collegian covered all five campuses in the areas of campus news, campus Life, academics, administration, features, and opinions.

=== Sport ===
The college athletics teams were nicknamed the Jaguars.

== Notable alumni ==
=== Politics and business ===
- Gloria Butler, American politician
- Howard Mosby, American politician
- Keisha Waites, American politician
- Eason Jordan, American business executive
- Valentino Achak Deng, Sudanese education minister

=== Music and arts ===
- Gucci Mane, American rapper
- Canibus, Jamaican-American rapper
- Janelle Monáe, American singer and actress
- Drew Thomas, American comedian

=== Sports ===
- Ron Blomberg, American baseball player
- Marlon Byrd, American baseball player
- Shad Gaspard, American wrestler and actor
- Nick Green, American baseball player
- Eban Hyams, Indian-Israeli-Australian former basketball player
- Kimani Ffriend, Jamaican basketball player
- Martin Nuñez, Uruguayan soccer player
- Musa Abdul-Aleem, American basketball player
- Earl Calloway, Bulgarian basketball player
- Gary Hines, American handball player
- Jonathan Igbinovia, Nigerian tennis player
- Junior Sandoval, Honduran soccer player
- Rocky Trice, American basketball player
- Alan Busenitz, American baseball player
- Anthony Carter, American baseball player
- Robby Hammock, American baseball player
- Milt Hill, American baseball player
- Mike Sharperson, American baseball player
- Herm Winningham, American baseball player
- Emmanuel D'Andrea, Puerto Rican soccer player
- Andrew Pendelton III, American wrestler
