= Ice Airport Alaska =

- Genre: Reality
- No. of seasons: 6
- No. of episodes: 50

Production
- Executive producers: Christian Broadhurst; Alexander Gardiner; John Cavanagh; David Royle; Greg Chivers; Pamela A. Aguilar; Dan Wolf
- Producer: John Bonny
- Production companies: Rare TV; Smithsonian Networks

Original release
- Network: Smithsonian Channel
- Release: November 15, 2020

Ice Airport Alaska is a TV series on the Smithsonian Channel about Ted Stevens Anchorage International Airport. A 6 episode first season premiered on November 15, 2020. On December 12, 2021, a second season was announced with a premiere date of January 9, 2022. A seventh season has been ordered.

== Premise ==
Ice Airport Alaska follows operations at Ted Stevens International Airport in Anchorage, Alaska one of the world's busiest cargo airports where staff work under harsh conditions with temperatures as low as -38 Celsius and winds over 100 mph.

== Episodes ==
=== Series overview ===
| Season | Episodes | Originally released | |
| Season | Episodes | First released | Last released |
|---|---|---|---|
| 1 | 6 | November 15, 2020 | December 20, 2020 |
| 2 | 6 | January 9, 2022 | February 6, 2022 |
| 3 | 8 | January 8, 2023 | February 26, 2023 |
| 4 | 10 | October 8, 2023 | December 17, 2023 |
| 5 | 10 | October 27, 2024 | December 29, 2024 |
| 6 | 10 | October 13, 2025 | November 10, 2025 |

=== Season 1 (2020) ===
| No. overall | No. in season | Title | Original release date | U.S. viewers (millions) |
|---|---|---|---|---|
| 1 | 1 | "Winter is Coming" | November 15, 2020 | N/A |
| 2 | 2 | "Struck By Lightning" | November 22, 2020 | N/A |
| 3 | 3 | "Light Out" | November 29, 2020 | N/A |
| 4 | 4 | "Coronavirus Crisis" | December 6, 2020 | N/A |
| 5 | 5 | "Relentless Winter" | December 13, 2020 | N/A |
| 6 | 6 | "50 Years Storm" | December 20, 2020 | N/A |

=== Season 2 (2022) ===
| No. overall | No. in season | Title | Original release date | U.S. viewers (millions) |
|---|---|---|---|---|
| 7 | 1 | "Into the Storm" | January 9, 2022 | N/A |
| 8 | 2 | "Heavy Lifting" | January 16, 2022 | N/A |
| 9 | 3 | "Emergency Landing" | January 23, 2022 | N/A |
| 10 | 4 | "Whiskey and Water" | January 30, 2022 | N/A |
| 11 | 5 | "War Planes and Sled Dogs" | February 6, 2022 | N/A |
| 12 | 6 | "Mayday" | February 6, 2022 | N/A |

=== Season 3 (2023) ===
| No. overall | No. in season | Title | Original release date | U.S. viewers (millions) |
|---|---|---|---|---|
| 13 | 1 | "Holiday Whiteout" | January 8, 2023 | N/A |
| 14 | 2 | "Cold Welcome" | January 15, 2023 | N/A |
| 15 | 3 | "Pararescue" | January 22, 2023 | N/A |
| 16 | 4 | "Lifelines" | January 29, 2023 | N/A |
| 17 | 5 | "Engine Failure" | February 5, 2023 | N/A |
| 18 | 6 | "Arctic Airlift" | February 12, 2023 | N/A |
| 19 | 7 | "Snow Jammed" | February 19, 2023 | N/A |
| 20 | 8 | "Thin Ice" | February 26, 2023 | N/A |

=== Season 4 (2023) ===
| No. overall | No. in season | Title | Original release date | U.S. viewers (millions) |
|---|---|---|---|---|
| 21 | 1 | "Arctic Guardians" | October 8, 2023 | N/A |
| 22 | 2 | "Arctic Survival" | October 15, 2023 | N/A |
| 23 | 3 | "Crisis At Crooked Creek" | October 22, 2023 | N/A |
| 24 | 4 | "Snow Bomb" | October 29, 2023 | N/A |
| 25 | 5 | "Ice Warriors" | November 5, 2023 | N/A |
| 26 | 6 | "Wild Ice" | November 12, 2023 | N/A |
| 27 | 7 | "Snow, Sweat and Gears" | November 19, 2023 | N/A |
| 28 | 8 | "On Thin Ice" | December 3, 2023 | N/A |
| 29 | 9 | "Runway Mayday" | December 10, 2023 | N/A |
| 30 | 10 | "Thawed Out" | December 17, 2023 | N/A |

=== Season 5 (2024) ===
| No. overall | No. in season | Title | Original release date | U.S. viewers (millions) |
|---|---|---|---|---|
| 31 | 1 | "Flight of the Grizzly" | October 27, 2024 | N/A |
| 32 | 2 | "Mountain Sheep, Pizza Pie" | November 4, 2024 | N/A |
| 33 | 3 | "The Flight Before Christmas" | November 10, 2024 | N/A |
| 34 | 4 | "Shivering Timbers" | November 17, 2024 | N/A |
| 35 | 5 | "Flight to Glory" | November 24, 2024 | N/A |
| 36 | 6 | "Avalance Warning" | December 1, 2024 | N/A |
| 37 | 7 | "The Big Chill" | December 8, 2024 | N/A |
| 38 | 8 | "Sunspot" | December 15, 2024 | N/A |
| 39 | 9 | "Runway Meltdown" | December 22, 2024 | N/A |
| 40 | 10 | "Flight of the Goose" | December 29, 2024 | N/A |

=== Season 6 (2025) ===
| No. overall | No. in season | Title | Original release date | U.S. viewers (millions) |
|---|---|---|---|---|
| 41 | 1 | "Jumbo Crisis" | October 13, 2025 | N/A |
| 42 | 2 | "Life Beyond Zero" | October 13, 2025 | N/A |
| 43 | 3 | "Moose vs Helicopter" | October 20, 2025 | N/A |
| 44 | 4 | "Attack of the Yeti" | October 20, 2025 | N/A |
| 45 | 5 | "Winter Heat" | October 27, 2025 | N/A |
| 46 | 6 | "My Foggy Valentine" | October 27, 2025 | N/A |
| 47 | 7 | "Thanksgiving Day Delay" | November 3, 2025 | N/A |
| 48 | 8 | "Edge of Today" | November 3, 2025 | N/A |
| 49 | 9 | "Volcano Preppers" | November 10, 2025 | N/A |
| 50 | 10 | "Top of the World" | November 10, 2025 | N/A |

== See also ==
- Flying Wild Alaska, a TV show documenting life in an Alaska bush airline
- Ice Pilots NWT, a TV show documenting life in an NWT bush airline
- Arctic Air, a dramatic fiction TV show about airline operations in the arctic
