= The Abingdon Co. =

Abingdon Co.
- Industry: Watchmaking
- Incorporated: US
- Founded: November 3, 2007; 18 years ago
- Founder: Chelsea Abingdon Welch (Mullin)
- Headquarters: Las Vegas, Nevada, US

The Abingdon Company is an independent watchmaker founded in 2007 by Chelsea Abingdon Welch. The company manufactures what it describes as the first aviation watch specifically designed for women.

== History ==
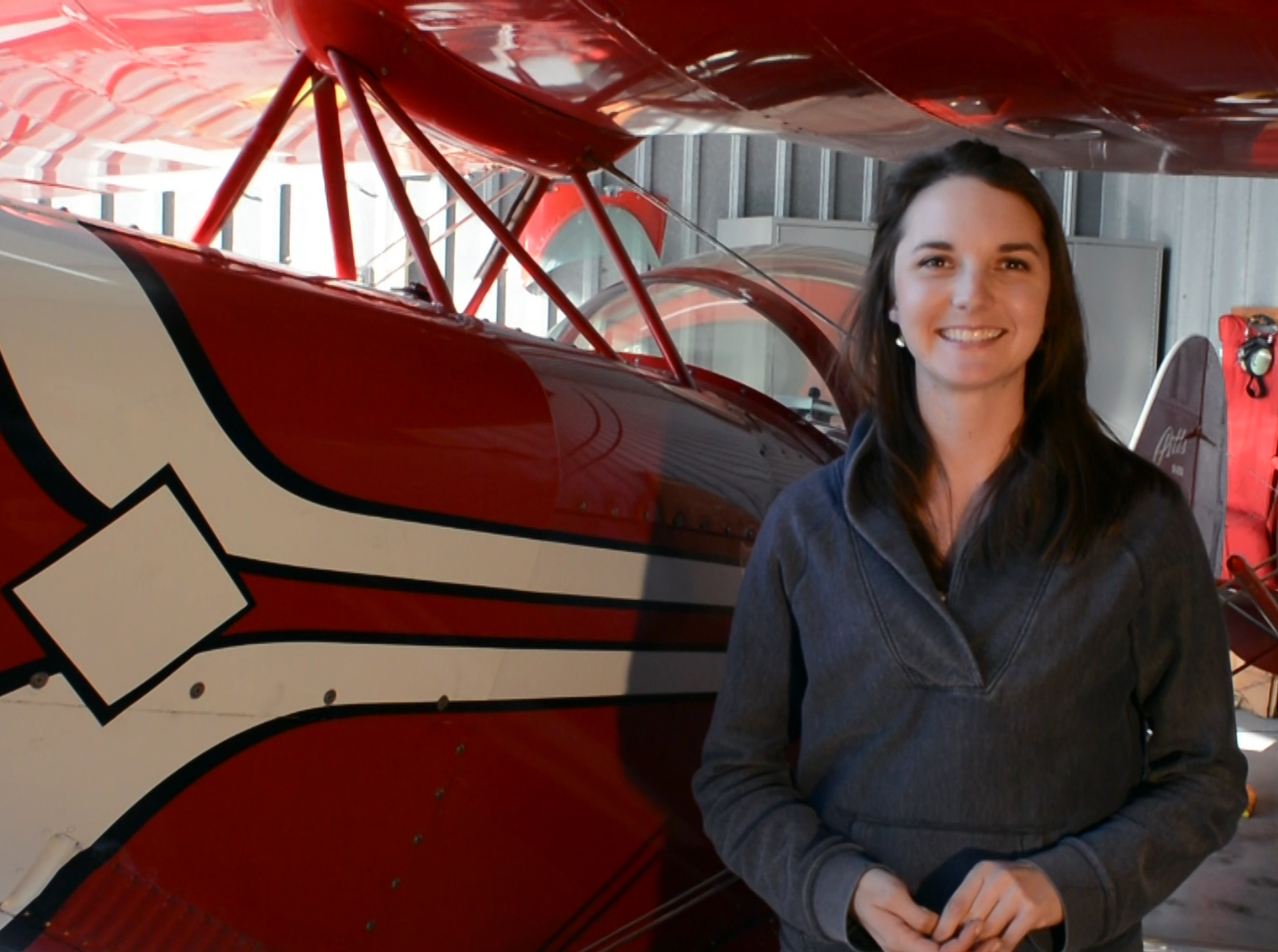
Chelsea Abingdon Welch (Mullin), the founder of the Abingdon Co., 2014

Abingdon Co. watch company was founded on November 3, 2007, by a 22-years old Chelsea Abingdon Welch (Mullin), who had recently obtained her pilot licence. She found out that no manufacturer produced pilot watches for women and soon confirmed that many women pilots and mechanics are interested in such timepieces: functional, yet fashionable, versatile, and made specifically for women. Abington spent over 11 months designing two first models: Jackie and Amelia. The timepieces were produced by factories in Hong Kong. In 2010, Abingdon moved the company's office to Las Vegas. In 2025, the company announced the launch of its flagship store in Las Vegas downtown.

In 2014, Abington pitched her project at Shark Tank with no success. Later, she secured investments from other sources to expand Abingdon Co. line with diving watches, military watches, racing watches, etc, all aimed at active, adventurous women, looking for more utilitarian and capable models. The focus on female customers in a male-dominated watch industry (and male-dominated professions) became the core of the company's ethos.

== Distribution ==
Abingdon Co. distributes its watches on the company's website, aviation and pilot stores, Army & Air Force Exchange Service stores, aviation museums' shops, and women's clothing and fashion retailers.

== Activities ==
The company is a sponsor and the official timekeeper of the all-women cross-country Air Race Classic.

== Models ==
The 2023 Legends series pay homage to women aviators. The first release of 1,102 units was made in collaboration with the National WASP WWII Museum with the production number being a reference to the number of Women Airforce Service Pilots (WASP) pilots who served during the World War II.

Abingdon Co. uses Swiss, Japanese, and American-made movements. The complications of different models may include dual or triple time zones, date-display, E6-B flight computer, compass, special bezel to assist in memorizing ATIS codes, world timer, stopwatch, Zulu time (Amelia), chronograph (Jackie), increased water resistance, wet suit expander band, and diver's outer bezel (for diver watch models).

The company works closely with female pilots, divers, and other professionals, to design watches based om their requirements.
