= Ben Dukes =

American country singer

Ben Dukes (born March 20, 1979) is an American Country artist, songwriter, and actor. Dukes has released one EP, "Down in Flames" and one full-length album, "Walkin Thru Hell". He has been award-nominated for his songwriting and has appeared twice as a musical guest on The Late Late Show with Craig Ferguson.

== Early life and education ==
Dukes was born on March 20, 1979, in Spartanburg, South Carolina, USA. He grew up in a small town called LaGrange, Georgia. His father worked for a textile company in town, and his mother was a writer for the local paper, the LaGrange Daily News. As a child, he was encouraged to study poetry as well as music. He attended LaGrange High School where he played football, sang in the school choir, and won awards in poetry and acting at local literary competitions. He attended The University of Georgia, at the Terry College of Business, graduating with a BBA. He was awarded the Varsity Football Letter from the University of Georgia as well as several academic ALL-SEC Awards and was named the "Scout of the Year" for the football team in both 1999 and 2000. He is a brother of the Delta Sigma Pi professional fraternity.

== Musical career ==
In 2008, Dukes entered the "Next GAC Star" Talent competition. His song, "I Can't Pray" and the accompanying video were voted by fans as a top pick in the online competition, and played on the national broadcast of the show.

Dukes performed in small venues for the next few years. He took a job working part-time at the studio of The Late Late Show host, and lived in his truck while working on an EP release. Dukes appeared twice in opening sketches for the program, once as the “French Guitarist” and another time as the “Sinister Man” incoherently questioning the host, Craig Ferguson before the start of the show. The show's host, Ferguson, invited Dukes to play as a guest on the show in 2012, at about the time the EP was released.

Following his television appearance, Dukes was selected to perform a showcase at South-By-Southwest in March 2013. At that time, Dukes also released his first full-length LP, Walkin Thru Hell. The title track, “Walkin Thru Hell” was nominated for Best Country Song by the Hollywood Music in Media Awards. Dukes returned as a Musical Guest on The Late Late Show on May 18, 2013 when he performed his first wide-release single, “Old Fixer Upper.”

Dukes has since gone on to play at a number of festivals across the country. In 2015, he toured in the Southwestern United States. Dukes appeared on the NBC soap opera Days of Our Lives on May 15, 2015.
