= The Comedy & Magic Club =

The Comedy & Magic Club is located in Hermosa Beach, California and opened in 1978 by Mike Lacey. The club's beachside location has made it a favorite destination for both comedians and audience members for a long time. Many of the top comics in the industry have referred to it as their home club. Gabriel Iglesias, Ian Bagg, Cristela Alonzo, Daniel Tosh, Arsenio Hall, and Jay Leno appear regularly. Leno has held a weekly residency on most Sunday evenings for many years.

Their audiences are held in high regard by the comedians which frequent the venue as being some of the best in the country. It is a common practice for comedians preparing for a five-minute late night appearance to perform and polish their routines at the club.
