= Ted Alexandro =

American stand-up comedian (born 1969)

- Born: Ted Alexandro; January 26, 1969 (age 57); Bellerose, Queens, New York, U.S.

Comedy career
- Years active: May 1992 – present
- Medium: Stand-up
- Genre: Observational comedy
- Website: http://tedalexandro.com/

Ted Alexandro (born January 26, 1969) is an American stand-up comedian from New York City. He has appeared on most late night talk shows and has had his own half-hour specials on Comedy Central. Alexandro cites Louis C.K. as a mentor.

== Early life and education ==
Alexandro is a native of Bellerose, Queens, New York, and he attended St. Francis Preparatory School. His father was a New York City Public School teacher in Brooklyn for 30 years, and his mother worked in the home, raising five kids. She taught high school religion, health and sex education. Alexandro went to City College of New York, with a major in music with a concentration in jazz piano. He later transferred to Queens College, where he obtained a master's degree in elementary education. At Queens College, he did sketch comedy with Hollis James. Alexandro graduated from Queens College in 1994.

== Biography ==
Upon graduating, he taught elementary school music for five years and performed comedy at night. Since then, Alexandro has appeared on the Late Show with David Letterman, Late Night with Conan O'Brien, Jimmy Kimmel Live!, The Late Late Show with Craig Ferguson, Dr. Katz, The Rob and Joe Show and two half-hour Comedy Central Presents specials. He has also appeared on Oz, Louie and Inside Amy Schumer.

Time Out NY listed Ted as one of 21 New York Comedy Scene Linchpins: "As a comic, Ted Alexandro is a New York fixture as firm as bedrock."

In a career spanning over twenty years he has opened for Chuck Berry, Smokey Robinson, Louis C.K., Lewis Black, Craig Ferguson, Dennis Miller, Joan Rivers, and Jim Gaffigan.

Ted was one of the founders of The New York Comedians Coalition, which raised the pay for comedians in NYC comedy clubs.

He has been very active with the Occupy Wall Street movement and he is one of the founders of Occupy Astoria Long Island City.

In 2014, he launched the comedy web series Teachers Lounge which he is independently produced and wrote with his partner and co-star Hollis James, and which featured Lewis Black, Jim Gaffigan, Dave Attell, Judah Friedlander, Jim Norton, Judy Gold, Todd Barry, Rachel Feinstein, Michael Che, and musician Ted Leo as teachers hanging out in the teachers lounge of an elementary school. In 2014, Teachers Lounge won two Cynopsis Digital Media Awards: Best New Comedy Web Series and Jim Gaffigan for Best Guest Appearance in a Comedy Web Series.

In 2020, Alexandro released the Stay At Home special on YouTube.
