= Flying Wild Alaska =

American documentary TV series

- Created by: Discovery Channel
- Country of origin: United States
- Original language: English
- No. of seasons: 3
- No. of episodes: 31

Production
- Production locations: Alaska, United States
- Running time: Approx. 43 minutes

Original release
- Network: Discovery Channel (2011–2012)
- Release: January 14, 2011 – July 20, 2012

Flying Wild Alaska is a documentary television series that aired on Discovery Channel in 2011 and 2012.

The show features the Tweto family from Unalakleet, Alaska who run the Alaska airline Era Alaska. They operate the hub operations from Unalakleet. The show also features other segments from their bases in Utqiagvik (Barrow), Deadhorse, and other places.

== Cast ==
=== Tweto family ===
- Jim Tweto, the COO of the airline, was born in Wichita, Kansas, but his family moved to Silver Bay, Minnesota shortly after his birth. He then moved to Anchorage, Alaska at the age of 18 with a hockey scholarship at the University of Alaska-Anchorage. Shortly after moving, he realized his true passion was aviation, and in 1980 moved to Unalakleet, Alaska, where he met his wife Ferno. He became the COO of Era when the Frontier Flying Service, Era Aviation, and Hageland Aviation merged in 2009, becoming the largest regional airline in Alaska. Jim Tweto was killed in a plane crash on June 16, 2023, at the age of 68.
- Ferno Tweto, the Unalakleet station manager and wife of COO Jim Tweto, was born in Anchorage and raised in Unalakleet. Ferno is also a pilot, earning her pilot certificate from a school in Everett, Washington in 1981. Ferno met Jim when he came to Unalakleet in 1980, and they married eight years later in 1988. They worked together side by side ever since and had three daughters, two of whom are showcased on the show.
- Ariel Tweto is part of the Unalakleet ground crew, and is Jim and Ferno's second child. Like her mother, she ran cross-country and has run every day since 2002. She was also a contestant on the ABC game show Wipeout in 2008 and 2009. The 2011–2012 season of Flying Wild Alaska depicted Ariel taking flight training to earn her pilot's license. Her instructor, featured in the show, is Chelsea Abingdon Welch. Ariel received her private pilot certificate on April 21, 2012. Ariel became a frequent guest on The Late Late Show with Craig Ferguson, even joining Ferguson for a time during his week of episodes in Scotland in 2012 and near the end of Ferguson's tenure in December 2014. Tweto has a recurring voice role on the Fox animated sitcom The Great North, playing a teenage girl named Kima Evanoff.
- Ayla Tweto, like her sister Ariel, is part of the Unalakleet ground crew. Later living in Anchorage, she has studied to be a paramedic. She visits the rest of her family in Unalakleet every weekend and has her private pilot's certificate.

=== Others ===
The show also features other various pilots from cities all around Alaska.

Pamyua has provided background music for Flying Wild Alaska.

- Jared Cummings, pilot for Era based in Kotzebue. Specializing in off-airport landings, he also owns and operates his own company known as the Golden Eagle Outfitters.
- Sarah Fraher, pilot based in St Mary's.
- Luke Hickerson, lead pilot and check airman based in Utqiagvik (Barrow).
- Ben Pedersen, pilot based in Unalakleet.
- John Ponts, pilot based in Utqiagvik (Barrow). He is a former pro skateboarder from San Diego who caught a bug for flying after earning his pilot's license in an attempt to spot empty swimming pools to skate in from the air.
- Erik Snuggerud, lead pilot based in Bethel.
- Doug Stewart, pilot based in Nome.
- Nick Stone, co-pilot based in Nome.
- Chelsea Abingdon Welch, flight instructor out of Unalakleet

== Episodes ==
=== Season 1 (2011) ===
No. overall	No. in season	Title	Original release date
1	1	"Meet the Twetos"	January 14, 2011
In the frigid Alaskan town of Unalakleet, the Twetos and their family-run airline Era Alaska Aviation battle the arctic elements to transport supplies and passengers to some of the most inaccessible spots in North America.
2	2	"Life or Death"	January 21, 2011
Pilot Luke Hickerson transports dangerous chemicals from Utqiagvik (Barrow) to the remote village of Atqasuk. In Unalakleet, the cold and dark winter causes its first death and Jim must make arrangements to transport the casket.
3	3	"Blow it Up"	January 28, 2011
In a dangerous mission, pilot Doug Doherty flies along Russian airspace to transport volatile explosives to the island of St Lawrence. In Unk, pilot Ben slams into a large bird in the middle of his flight.
4	4	"Indian Summer"	February 4, 2011
Unseasonably warm weather sends Jim up to the Brooks Range to look for potential landing strips. Ferno and Ariel prepare an Eskimo feast for returning pilot John Ponts and the week ends with an icy plunge into the Unalakleet River.
5	5	"Tundra Taxis"	February 11, 2011
In Bethel, construction crews race to finish ERA's newest hangar before the unforgiving winter snows arrive. But when Jim flies in to inspect the progress, he is far from happy. In Unalakleet, fierce crosswinds blow John Ponts' tiny 207 all over the sky.
6	6	"Greenhorn Ben"	February 18, 2011
Pilot Yuri Ivanoff trains in Bethel for a potential promotion to fly the 208 Caravan. But danger strikes when heavy ice forms on the wings. In Unalakleet, weeks of rain force Jim to do a river landing and a greenhorn comes on board during some of the worst weather to fly.
7	7	"Deep Freeze"	February 25, 2011
Era Alaska makes a special canine delivery to four-time Iditarod champion Lance Mackey in Fairbanks. After the first snow in Unalakleet, Jim and Ferno cope with an influx of schoolteachers on their busiest day of the year.
8	8	"Bush Brawl"	March 4, 2011
A dangerous frozen river landing leaves Jim and Ferno skating on thin ice, while Ariel's flying lessons end in frustration. The biggest snowstorm of the season hits, shutting down all of Western Alaska and leaving several Era pilots up in the air.
9	9	"Trick or Tweto"	March 11, 2011
Halloween in Alaska brings vicious crosswinds that wreak havoc on Era's small planes. Ariel hopes to learn the family business in Unk, but a power blackout tests her abilities when she takes over as station manager.
10	10	"Goodbye Sun"	March 18, 2011
The approaching winter darkness fuels a mass exodus from Unalakleet. In Utqiagvik (Barrow), a bootlegger attempts to smuggle in illegal liquor and Luke races to complete a daring rescue before the sun sets for two months straight.

=== Season 2 (2011) ===
No. overall	No. in season	Title	Original release date
11	1	"Arctic Winds"	October 28, 2011
John Ponts fights heavy turbulence and angry passengers on a flight through the Nulato Hills. Jim and Ferno leave the terminal in the hands of the pilots, and Sarah's flight to rescue a villager lost in a storm turns into a battle for her own survival.
12	2	"Tomorrow Island"	November 4, 2011
Two pilots push their limits to land vital vaccines two miles from Russia on Alaska's most treacherous runway. In Unalakleet, Ariel Tweto takes to the skies once again and proves that she still has a lot to learn.
13	3	"Money in the Sky"	November 11, 2011
Two pilots attempt to deliver a specialty drill through a sea of fog. Luke brings the first ever ATM to Wainwright, along with a planeload of cash. Erik races to deliver passengers and critical supplies before a spring storm shuts him down. John makes a fur hat for his ill father and travels to California to visit him, hours before his death.
14	4	"Era Alaska Rises Again"	November 18, 2011
Jim faces a risky landing on a frozen river while Luke has problems getting his plane to take off, and a pilot carries vaccines to Russia's border.
15	5	"Every Dog Has Its Day"	November 25, 2011
The Iditarod dog sled race benefits Era Alaska; Ayla, Ariel and Ferno run with reindeer in Anchorage; a pilot deals with a malfunction; a tsunami warning is issued for the west coast.
16	6	"Blizzard BBQ"	December 2, 2011
A late winter storm menaces operations; Ben deals with icing conditions while Erik employs drastic measures to ship medicine to a snowed-in village.
17	7	"Guts and Glory"	December 9, 2011
Jim flies a group of rock climbers to Brooks Range; Luke takes a whaling crew over the sea to search for a hunting site.
18	8	"Top of the World"	December 16, 2011
Jim tries to find missing mountain climbers on Alaska's Brooks Range; Luke races a village elder to a hospital; a pilot tries to set a speed record to the North Pole
19	9	"Breakup"	December 23, 2011
Era Alaska provides aid to a village devastated by heavy flooding. Two pilots get lost in a sea of fog off the Russian coast while trying to deliver desperately needed ammunition. In Anchorage, Jim's prized Cessna 180 has a small engine fire during first start-up while getting refitted with a more powerful engine.
20	10	"Cakes on a Plane"	December 30, 2011
Ponts' old skate crew arrives to build a skate park for local kids on Unk's newly paved roads. Ariel takes to the skies in a new plane with dangerous results and lead Pilot Erik Snuggerud battles heavy turbulence with a very special delivery.
21	11	"Prop, Drop and Ball"	January 6, 2012
A heavy load of dangerous propane tanks shifts during takeoff, which leads to an aborted takeoff. Basketball between the ramp crew and pilots leads to new work assignments. Jim and Ferno air drop supplies to bear hunters, while Ponts and Ariel continue their flying lessons.
22	12	"New Wings Over Alaska"	January 13, 2012
Ariel looks for seagull eggs; Erik has a rough flight over a notorious runway; Sarah takes her first flight in a 208.
23	13	"One Flying Family"	January 20, 2012
Era Alaska ferries fire crews to combat wildfires across the state; Ariel flies solo for the first time; Ponts navigates a deadly pass on his first training flight.

=== Season 3 (2012) ===
No. overall	No. in season	Title	Original release date
24	1	"Running Out of Time"	June 8, 2012
Era Alaska digs deep to survive a brutal winter. Ariel Tweto joins in on a desperate search for her missing friend. Sarah Fraher attempts a difficult landing to aid a pilot stranded mid-runway. John Ponts attempts an emergency medical drop over the isolated Kavik camp.
25	2	"Zero Cabin Pressure"	June 15, 2012
Alaska's harshest winter in years wreaks havoc on Era's fleet. Sarah Fraher's aircraft door opens mid-flight. Doug's brakes freeze on an icy runway while carrying explosive chemicals. Jim attempts a risky landing atop the frozen Anvik River.
26	3	"Solar Flare Danger"	June 22, 2012
Villagers in Wainright lose their water supply due to the Arctic cold. Solar flares leave Ponts and Ben in harm's way. In Unalakleet, a criminal is on the loose and the Twetos are on edge.
27	4	"Return to Diomede"	June 29, 2012
The epic Iditarod dog sled race begins in Anchorage. Pilot Doug Stewart tests his limits while landing on a runway that is melting into the ocean. Pilot John Kapsner races to locate two snow-machiners that are lost overnight deep in the Alaskan Bush.
28	5	"Money Pit"	July 6, 2012
Erik is plagued by mechanical issues. Doug and John battle to keep their plane on an icy runway. Ariel receives a surprise visit.
29	6	"Radio Silence"	July 13, 2012
Ariel disappears from radio contact during a solo cross-country flight. Erik struggles to land his plane on a narrow runway.
30	7	"Into The Wind"	July 20, 2012
Jim Tweto makes a nearly impossible landing at Unalakleet. Sarah Fraher battles strong headwinds while attempting to deliver fuel to a research station.
31	8	"End of an Era"	July 20, 2012
Series Finale. After 30 years of running Era Alaska, Jim Tweto considers retirement. Doug loses his avionics over the North Slope. Ariel, under the guidance of instructor Chelsea Abingdon Welch reaches the end of her training and becomes a private pilot after facing the scrutiny of an FAA examiner.

== Broadcast Airings ==
Repeats of the series air on the digital broadcast network Quest.

== Death of Jim Tweto ==
On June 16, 2023, Jim Tweto was killed in a plane crash near Shaktoolik, along with passenger Shane Reynolds, a hunting and fishing guide. The NTSB preliminary report stated that the plane impacted a tree during takeoff. The final report determined the accident to be caused by "The pilot’s encounter with gusting tailwind conditions during takeoff, which resulted in impact with a tree, a loss of control, and subsequent impact with terrain".

== See also ==
- Ice Pilots NWT, a similar show based on a bush airline in the Northwest Territories of Canada
- Ice Airport Alaska, a similar show based around Ted Stevens Airport and the airlines that operate out of it
- Arctic Air, a dramatic fiction TV show similar in premise to this documentary TV show
