= Joel Stein =

American journalist (born 1971)

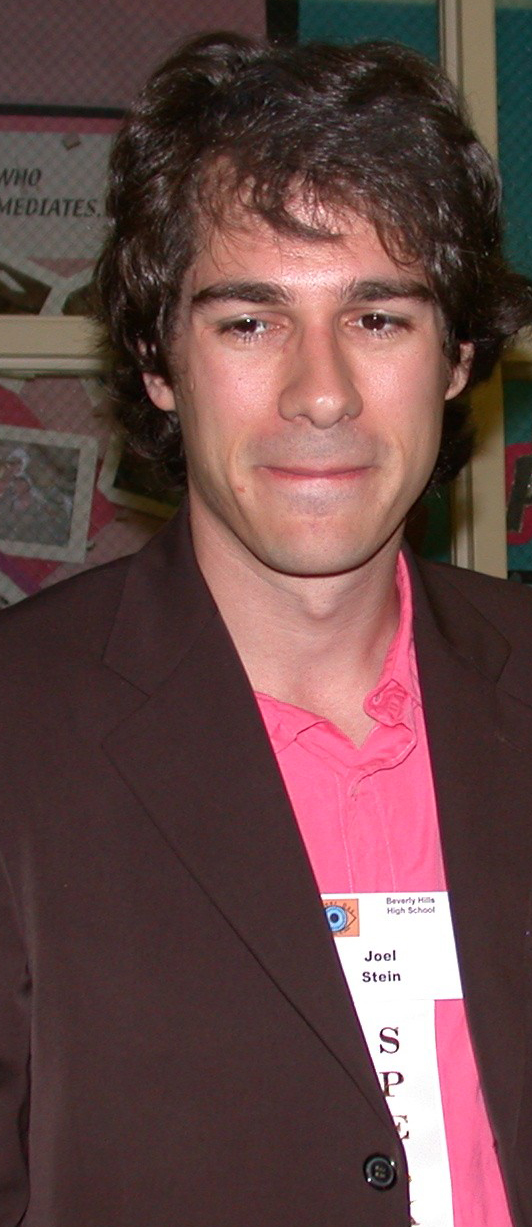
- Stein at Beverly Hills High School for "Career Day", May 16, 2006
- Born: July 23, 1971 (age 55); Edison, New Jersey, United States
- Education: Stanford University (MA)
- Occupations: Journalist; political commentator
- Spouse: Cassandra Barry (m. 2002)
- Children: 1
- Writing career
- Language: English
- Years active: 1993–present

Joel Stein (born July 23, 1971) is an American journalist who wrote for the Los Angeles Times. He wrote a column and occasional articles for Time for 19 years until 2017.

== Early life ==
Stein grew up in Edison, New Jersey, the son of a salesman. He is Jewish. Stein attended J.P. Stevens High School, where he was a writer and entertainment editor for Hawkeye, the student newspaper. He majored in English at Stanford University and wrote a weekly column for the school's student newspaper The Stanford Daily. He graduated in 1993 with a BA and an MA and moved to New York City, and then to Los Angeles in 2005.

== Career ==
Stein's career began as a writer and researcher for Martha Stewart Living. He worked a year for Stewart and later quipped that she had fired him twice in the same day. Stein did fact-checking at various publications before becoming a sports editor and columnist for Time Out New York, where he stayed for two years. While working at Time Out New York, he was a contestant on MTV's short-lived game show Idiot Savants. Stein joined Time in August 1997 and his last column for the magazine appeared on November 16, 2017. In signing off, he began, "Since my first column, 19 years ago, readers and co-workers have clamored to have me fired." He concluded, "There are times when society needs a punk who doesn’t care. There are far fewer times when society needs a 46-year-old punk who doesn’t care. I’ve always been guilty of hanging on too long out of fear of graduating college, ending relationships and transitioning from democracy to authoritarianism. I look forward to a future columnist who makes me laugh about that."

Stein sometimes appears as a commentator on television programs such as I Love the '80s. He also co-produced three TV pilots: an animated series for VH1 and two for ABC. The animated show, titled Hey Joel, aired in Canada and later in South Africa, while the other two were never picked up. He was a writer and producer for the sitcom Crumbs.

Stein taught a class on humor writing at Princeton University before moving to Los Angeles in early 2005 to write for the Los Angeles Times. In 2012, he published a book, Man Made: A Stupid Quest for Masculinity (ISBN 978-0446573122).

In 2019, Stein published In Defense of Elitism: Why I'm better than you and you're better than someone who didn't buy this book. In the book, Stein explores several subjects related to the elitism in politics and culture, defending the role of experts and dividing the elites in two groups: Intellectual Elites and Boat Elites. He interviews cartoonist Scott Adams, Disinfomedia founder Jestin Coler, and political commentator Tucker Carlson, among others.

== Notable columns ==
On January 24, 2006, the Los Angeles Times published an anti-war and anti-military column by Stein under the headline "Warriors and Wusses" in which he wrote that it is a cop-out to oppose a war and yet claim to support the soldiers fighting it. "I don't support our troops. ... When you volunteer for the U.S. military, you pretty much know you're not going to be fending off invasions from Mexico and Canada. So you're willingly signing up to be a fighting tool of American imperialism ...". He prefaced his argument by stating that he does not support the troops in Iraq despite supporting the troops being "a position that even Calvin is unwilling to urinate on." Stein states he did three interviews about the column on the Hugh Hewitt radio show, with Tony Snow, and with a "liberal" in Oregon. Mark Steyn wrote in a New York Sun opinion piece that Stein was to be congratulated for the consistency of his position: "Stein is a hawkish chicken, disdaining the weasel formulation too many anti-war folks take refuge in." Warrant Officer Michael D. Fay wrote in The New York Times that Stein's comments made him feel "sad because they're so mistaken, sad because their voices are granted a modicum of credence in the public forum, and sad because they leave me feeling a little less at home."

In 2008, Stein wrote an article for the Los Angeles Times titled "Who runs Hollywood? C'mon", which mocked the canard of Jews controlling Hollywood by feigning outrage over declining acceptance of the stereotype.

In July 2010, Stein wrote a humor column for Time in which he expressed his discomfort at the impact immigration of Indians has had on his hometown of Edison. Stein initially took to Twitter to defend himself with a tweet saying "Didn't meant to insult Indians with my column this week. Also stupidly assumed their emails would follow that Gandhi non-violence thing." Time and Stein subsequently publicly apologized for the article. Stein's apology read: "I truly feel stomach-sick that I hurt so many people. I was trying to explain how, as someone who believes that immigration has enriched American life and my hometown in particular, I was shocked that I could feel a tiny bit uncomfortable with my changing town when I went to visit it. If we could understand that reaction, we'd be better equipped to debate people on the other side of the immigration issue." United States Senator from New Jersey Bob Menendez submitted a letter to Time stating that the column "not only fell terribly flat but crossed the lines of offensiveness toward a particular community that has dealt with violent hate crimes in the past. Mr. Stein's mocking allusions to revered deities in the Hindu religion are particularly reprehensible." Kal Penn, actor and former associate director in the White House Office of Public Engagement, also criticized the column for its portrayal of Indian Americans.

In May 2013, Stein penned a Time cover story titled "The Me Me Me Generation" about the narcissistic and immature tendencies of millennials, but how they will also "save us all." The New Republic, The Atlantic, New York, and The Nation, criticized Stein for selective use of evidence, for making sweeping generalizations about the behavior of millennials, and for repeating claims that prior generations had made about the young people in their times.

== Reception ==
The magazine-business trade publication Folio: named Stein on its list of Thirty Under 30. Stein was listed on Brill’s Content’s annual “Influence List” in 2000.

"I think he’s got the quirkiest sense of humor I see today," Walter Isaacson, the chairman and CEO of CNN News Group told Stanford Magazine. "Joel's honed that self-effacing self-indulgence to a great art form."

"I don't think I am a real journalist," Stein told Alex Kuczynski for The New York Times in 2000. "I feel like I am, well, whatever we all are now: I am a celebrity journalist." Kuczynski wrote that Stein's columns were marked by "bawdy humor, tasteless one-liners and something that can best be described as a sort of polished vulgarity."

== Depictions in popular culture ==
In 2000, The Onion spoofed Stein's persona in a satire whose headline was "Cocktail-Party Guest Cornered by Joel Stein."

In 2014, Stein played himself on an episode of The Neighbors along with Lawrence O'Donnell and Bill Nye.
