= Matt Kirshen =

British comedian

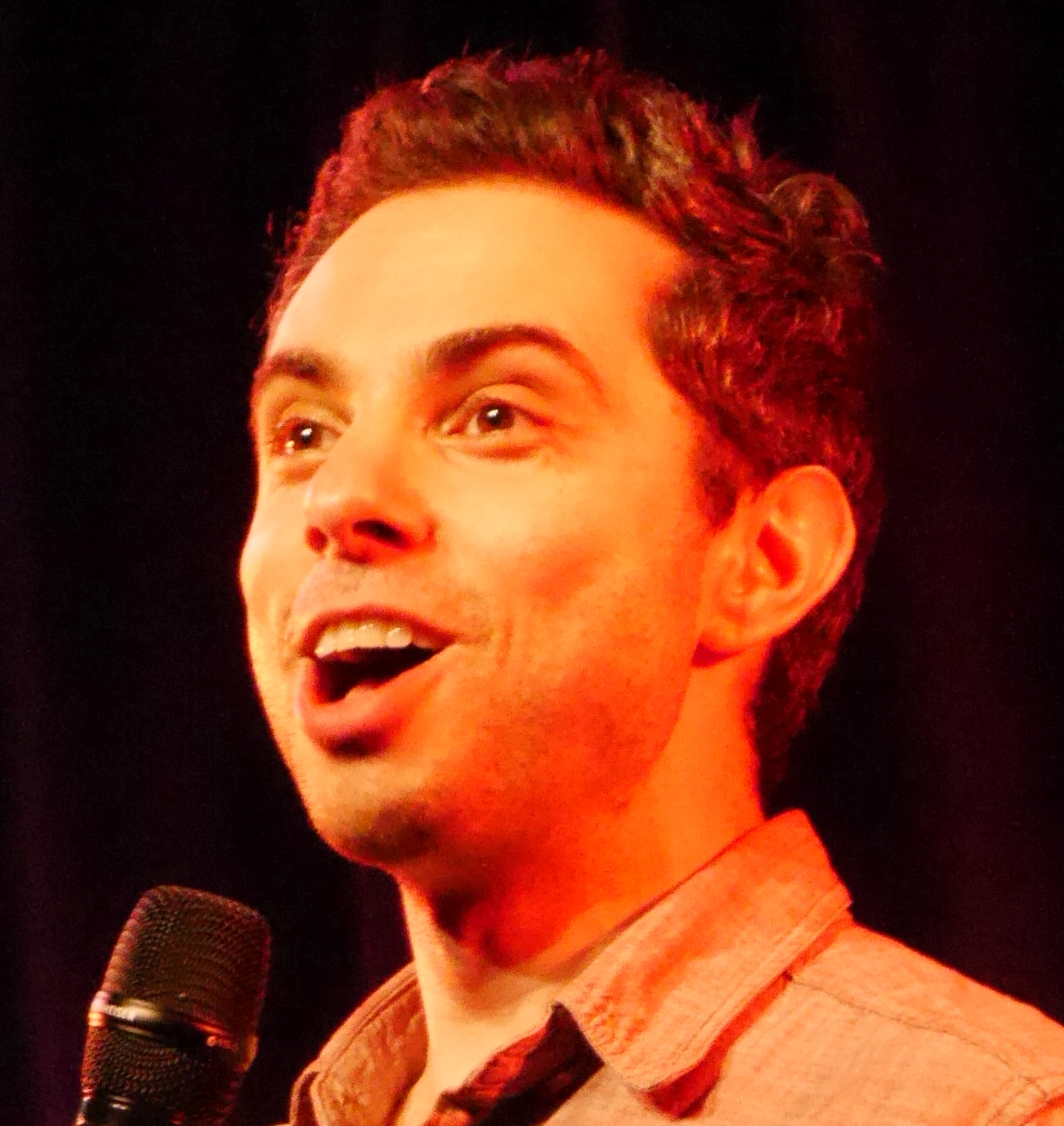
- Matt Kirshen, Glastonbury Festival, 2019
- Born: 1980 (age 45–46); London, England
- Education: Clare College, Cambridge

Comedy career
- Years active: 2001–present
- Medium: Stand-up comedy, film, television
- Genre: Stand-up comedy

Matt Kirshen (born 1980) is a British comedian, actor, writer, and presenter based in Los Angeles.

Initially known for jokes poking fun at his youthful appearance, he has since turned his attention to more general, real world, and topical subjects, with a tightly-written style involving multiple "taglines" for every joke. In 2007, he appeared in NBC's Last Comic Standing.

== Biography ==
Kirshen originates from North London, where he attended Merchant Taylors' School, Northwood. He subsequently studied Mathematics at Clare College, Cambridge. University marked the beginning of his comedy career. At university, Kirshen briefly edited Clareification, a magazine in which students mocked Cambridge traditions, satirised the events of the week, reported on silly student antics, and spread college gossip. He also started a comedy club in Clare College cellars and became well known within the Cambridge University comedy scene. He hosted these "Clare Comedy" nights during the latter years of his degree, and has continued to return as guest host, in addition to performing at the Clare May Ball. Prior to attempting stand-up, Kirshen earned some local notoriety as "The Wilf", in the double-act Crazy and The Wilf.

Since 2001, Kirshen has become a frequent performer at London clubs including the Comedy Store, and has completed several university tours. Kirshen was a finalist in So You Think You're Funny? at the 2003 Edinburgh Festival Fringe and was named Hackney Empire New Act of the Year. In 2007, he was one of the final seven comics in NBC's reality TV show Last Comic Standing. In 2008, he recorded a 30-minute special for Paramount Comedy, now known as Comedy Central (UK and Ireland). In 2009, he co-wrote and starred in the BBC Radio 4 sketch comedy series Bigipedia. He also released an album entitled I Guess We'll Never Know, which ranked in Punchline magazine's Top 10 comedy albums of 2009. In an appearance on the podcast International Waters, he vowed that "the world has seen the last of The Wilf", although when pressed, he joked, "Well, I guess we'll never know", in reference to his album of the same name. In 2016, Kirshen voiced Hugh on The Loud House episode "Study Muffin". His international stand-up performances include Singapore, Dubai, the Netherlands, Germany, and France.

Kirshen wrote for The Jim Jefferies Show on Comedy Central, for which he was nominated for a 2018 Writers Guild of America Award, and for season 5 of Arrested Development.

== Podcasts ==
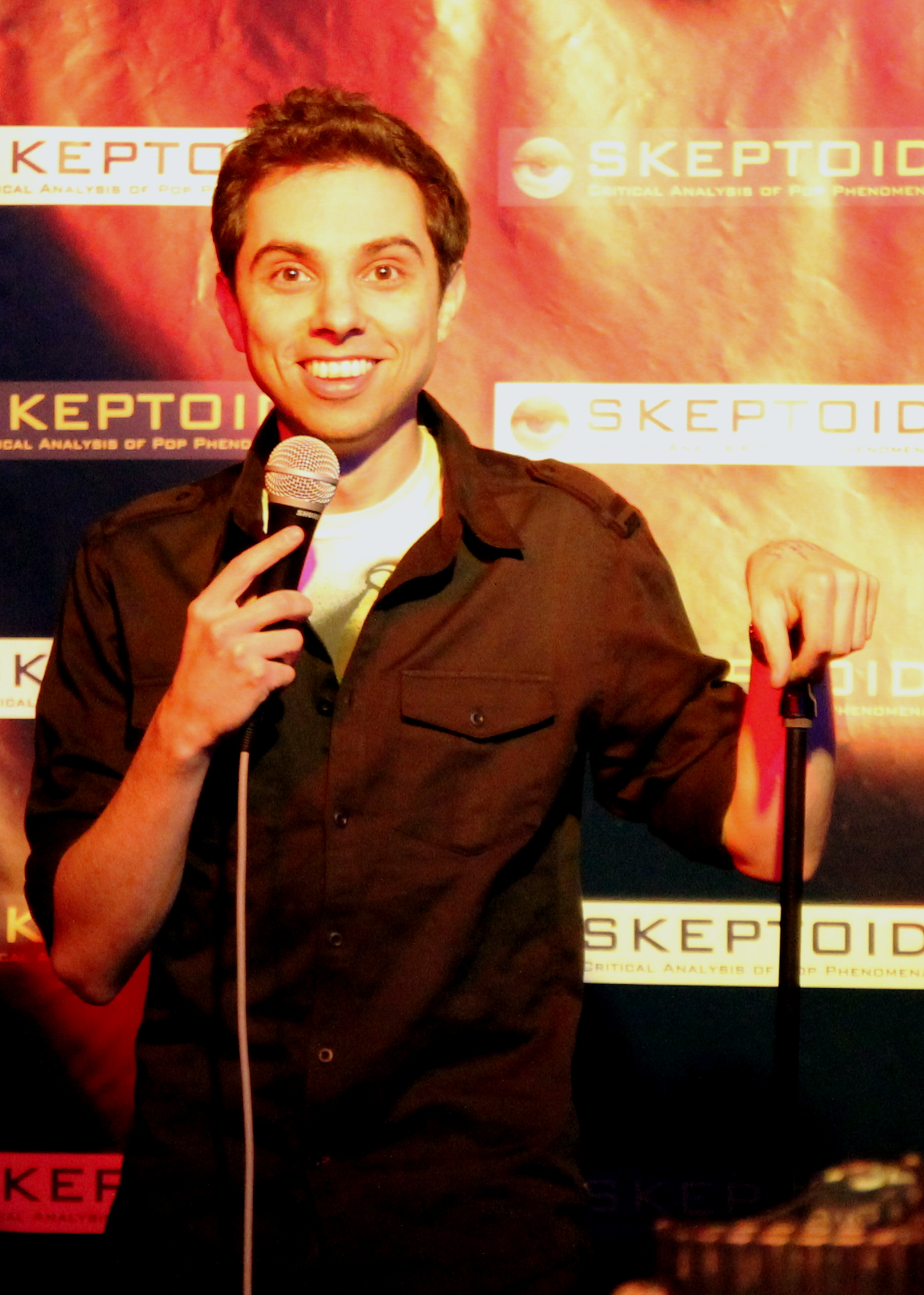
Matt Kirshen performs at the 300th episode party for Skeptoid: Critical Analysis of Pop Phenomena podcast

Kirshen co-hosts a science-based comedy podcast called Probably Science. Notable guests on the show include Janna Levin, Chris Hadfield, and Neil deGrasse Tyson.

As of December 2017, Kirshen has co-hosted seven episodes of the StarTalk family of podcasts. Guests on the episodes he has co-hosted include Rainer Weiss, Andy Weir, Adam Steltzner, Jim Green, Sheyna Gifford, Chuck Nice, Bill Nye, Jay Leno, Mona Chalabi, Joe Patterson, David Kipping, and Chris McKay.

Kirshen has also appeared on Ken Reid's TV Guidance Counselor podcast, The Carl Donnelly and Chris Martin Comedy Podcast, and The Comedian's Comedian.

== Filmography ==
- This Week at the Comedy Cellar, Comedy Central (2018–2019)
- The Jim Jefferies Show, Comedy Central (2017–2018)
- @Midnight with Chris Hardwick, Comedy Central (2017)
- StarTalk with Neil deGrasse Tyson, NatGeo (2016)
- The Loud House (2016) as Hugh (Episode: "Study Muffin")
- Comedy Knockout, truTV (2016)
- John Wants Answers (2015)
- Legit (2014)
- Gotham Comedy Live (2014)
- The Nerdist (2013)
- Home and Family (2013)
- Set List – Stand-Up Without A Net (2013)
- The Brit List (2012)
- Observational Comedy Disorder (2012)
- The Late Late Show with Craig Ferguson (2012)
- The Hour with George Stroumboulopoulos (2012)
- Late Night with Jimmy Fallon (2011)
- The Green Room with Paul Provenza (2011)
- The Late Late Show with Craig Ferguson (2011)
- Global Comedians (2010)
- The Most Annoying People of 2009 (2009)
- Rude Tube (2008)
- The World Stands Up (2008)
- Last Comic Standing (2007)
- Comedy Cuts (2007)
- 28 Acts in 28 Minutes (2005)

== Comedy recordings ==
- I Guess We'll Never Know (CD) – 5 May 2009
