= Clareification =

Student newspaper

- Type: Termly newspaper
- Owner: Union of Clare Students
- Editor: Dougie Howells (since 17 April 2026)

Clareification is the student newsletter of Clare College, a college of the University of Cambridge. It is produced termly by editor(s) elected each year by the student body.

In 2005, it won the 'Best College Paper' award in The Cambridge Student.

== Controversy ==
In 2007, in a guest-edited edition devoted to religious satire, entitled Crucification, the magazine re-printed one of the Danish Muhammad cartoons which provoked an international incident when they were originally published 15 months earlier.

The guest editor was taken into hiding due to the threat of violent reprisals. The college's former senior tutor, Patricia Fara, issued a statement saying, "The college finds the publication and the views expressed abhorrent." The college called a Court of Discipline to judge the student and suspended the newsletter's funding. The Cambridge Evening News described the issue as "racist", in an article in which an "insider" suggested that the magazine might constitute "racial incitement". Two students were subsequently interviewed under caution by police in connection with the issue.

Following the incident, the Union of Clare Students Executive independently published two further issues, predominantly devoted to satirising the coverage of the controversy. A new editor was elected the following academic year.

== Editors ==
Past editors of Clareification include the comedian Matt Kirshen and the philosopher Jonathan Birch.
