= Scott Knaster =

American technical writer

Scott Knaster is an American technical writer who has written many books, mostly dealing with Macintosh programming and using the Macintosh. He has worked for such companies as Apple Inc., General Magic, Microsoft, Danger Inc., and Google.

Knaster was a Technical Writer while at Alphabet. From April 2011 through March 2014, he was the editor of the Google Developers Blog (formerly Google Code Blog).

Knaster's first books on Macintosh programming in the late 1980s and early 1990s were considered required reading for Macintosh programmers for many years.

In addition to writing books, Knaster writes for several periodicals and web sites including Macworld, MacTech, and O'Reilly Media's Mac Dev Center.

Knaster is a regular speaker at Macworld Expo, MacHack (until it ended), and sits on the panel of Apple's Stump the Experts.

Knaster was a guest on MacBreak Weekly episode 354, "Leave Cindy Alone!".

Knaster appeared on the October 14, 2010 episode of John Wants Answers to discuss baseball.

Knaster is a stage actor who has appeared in many musical productions and played the lead role of Tevye in Fiddler on the Roof, and has written and performed his own show Adjacent to Greatness.

== Works ==
- Cooking with Hypertalk 2.0
- How to Write Macintosh Software: The Debugging Reference for Macintosh (2nd edition: 1988, ISBN 978-0-672-48429-2; 3rd edition: 1992, ISBN 978-0-201-60805-2)
- Macintosh Programming Secrets (1st edition: 1988) (2nd edition: 1992, ISBN 978-0-201-58134-8)
- Macworld Discover Internet Explorer 3 (1997, ISBN 978-0-7645-4031-8)
- MSN the Everyday Web (2001, ISBN 978-0-7356-1140-5)
- Mac Toys: 12 Cool Projects for Home, Office, and Entertainment (2004, ISBN 978-0-7645-4351-7)
- Hacking iPod and iTunes (2004, ISBN 978-0-7645-6984-5)
- Hacking Mac OS X Tiger: Serious Hacks, Mods and Customizations (2005, ISBN 978-0-7645-8345-2)
- Take Control of Switching to the Mac (2008, ISBN 978-1-933671-04-8)
- Learn Objective-C on the Mac (2008, ISBN 978-1-4302-1815-9)

Knaster was also the series editor for Addison-Wesley's Macintosh Inside Out, a collection of 19 technical books published over a 3-year period in the 1990s.
