= Jim Short (comedian) =

American comedian (1967–2025)

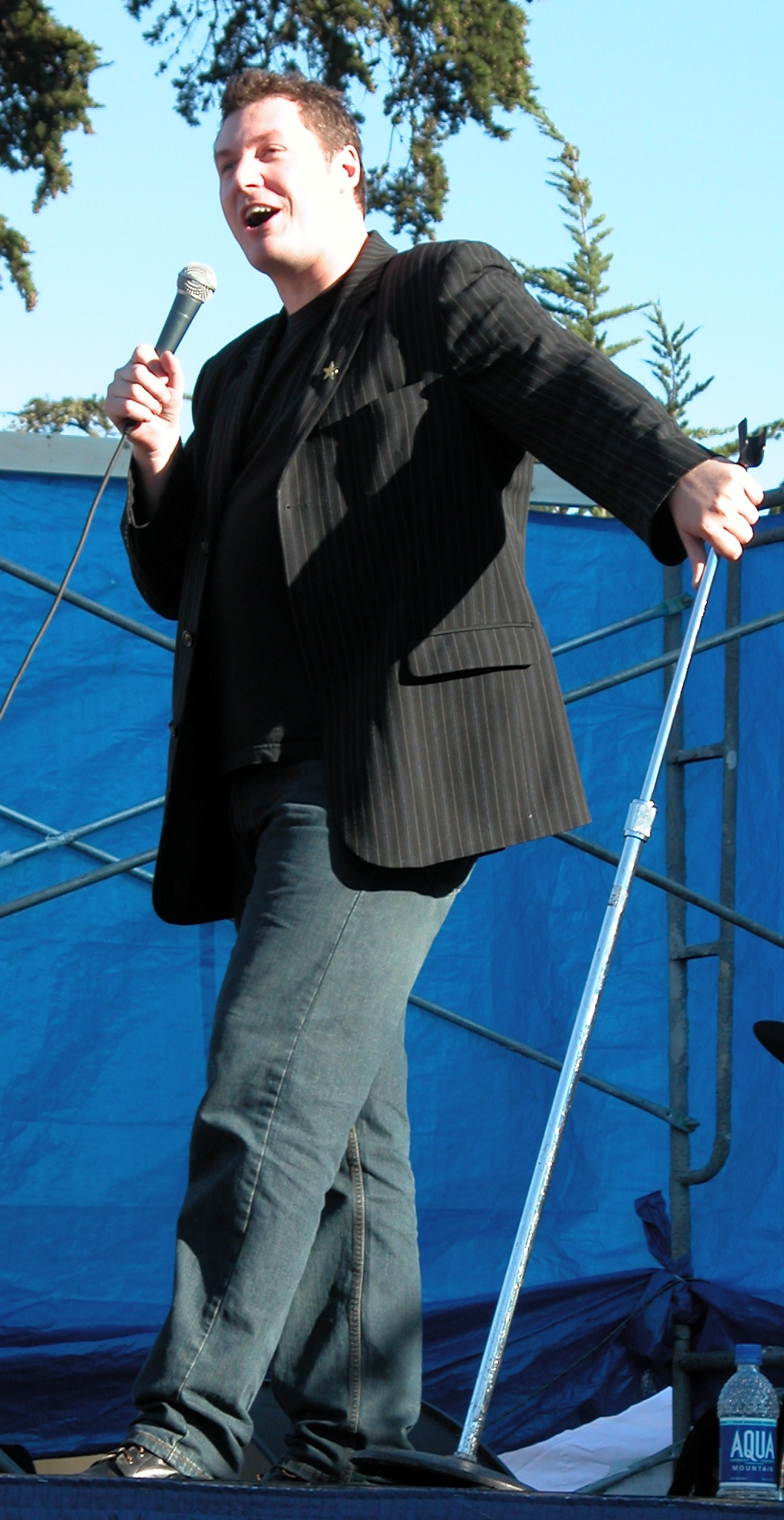
- Jim Short performing at Comedy Day 2004
- Born: January 1, 1967; Australia
- Died: January 5, 2025 (aged 58)
- Occupation: Stand-up comedian
- Website: http://www.jimshort.com

Jim Short (January 1, 1967 – January 5, 2025) was a stand-up comedian from San Francisco. Originally from Australia, he moved to Texas in 1979, and over time his faded accent caused some controversy, which he often joked about.

Short made numerous television appearances, including Shorties Watchin' Shorties, Late Show with David Letterman, The Late Late Show with Craig Ferguson, Late Night with Conan O'Brien, John Wants Answers, and Comedy Central's Premium Blend. He was winner of the 2004 San Francisco International Stand Up Competition and performed at the 2004 Montreal International Just For Laughs Comedy Festival, where he was deemed one of the "Talk of the Fest" performers.

Short toured regularly throughout the United States. His act comprised a mix of personal observations on pop and social culture, world media and history, and television and music references.

Short co-hosted the podcast Monsters of Talk along with Margaret Cho.

Short died on January 5, 2025, at the age of 58 from a stomach illness.
