= Keith Stattenfield =

American inventor

Keith Stattenfield is a senior Apple Computer software engineer. He started at Apple Computer in 1989 in the Information Systems & Technology group, then worked on the Macintosh operating system starting in 1995, from the Mac OS 7.5 release on. He led the Netbooting project starting in Mac OS 8.6, and then served as the overall technical lead of Mac OS 9. His California license plate reads "MAC OS 9".

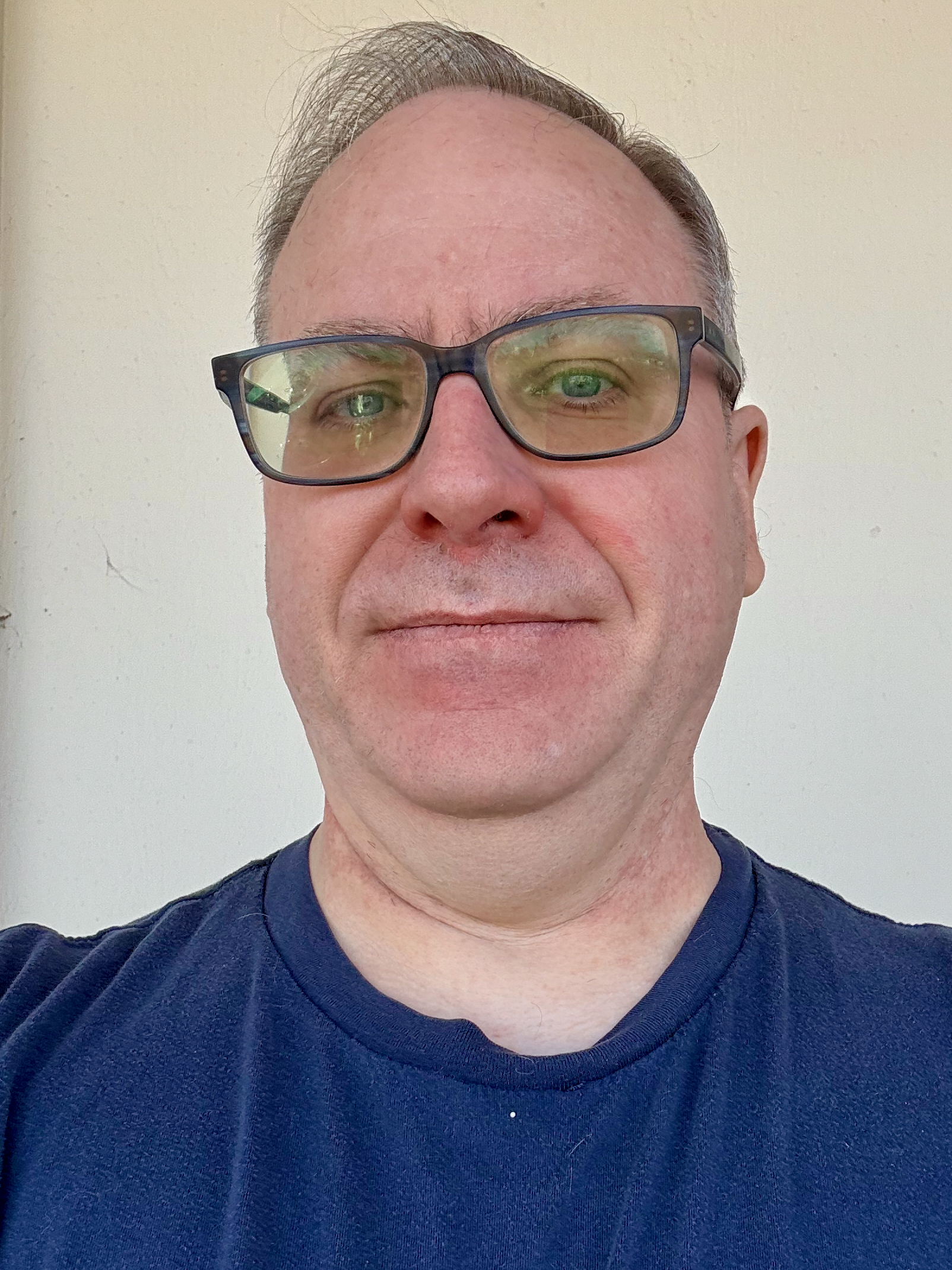
Stattenfield in February 2025

In 2001, he was ranked 14 on the MDJ POWER 25, a list of the most influential people in the Macintosh community.

He has often presented at conferences such as Apple's Worldwide Developers Conference and MacHack (convention).

Keith has a Public-access television show and web site called Keith Explains. He is also a frequent guest on the show John Wants Answers.
