= John Wants Answers =

American television series

John Wants Answers is a local television show that airs on public-access television channel KMVT 15 in Mountain View, California, United States. The show covers current events, social issues, and civics. There are occasional musical guests and other performers. The show debuted in June 2010.

== Format ==
In each episode, host John A. Vink describes the show as a courtroom drama, where he is the prosecutor and the guest is the expert witness.

The show is broadcast live on KMVT, as well as live steamed over the Internet. The show is syndicated to another 21 stations across the United States. Older episodes are available on YouTube and iTunes.

Viewers can send in their questions and comments during the show through Twitter or the show's website, and the messages are read and discussed during the show.

== Topics ==
The topics for the show usually fall into current events, civics, or social issues. Some current event topics have been North Korea, Gun Control, and Occupy Wall Street. Some civics topics have been the Electoral College, Supreme Court, Jury Duty, and First Amendment. Some social issues topics have been Being Gay, Prostate Cancer, and Bone Marrow.

== Awards ==
John Wants Answers won two Western Access Video Excellence (WAVE) awards in 2012 for the episode "Being Gay." The show won in the categories of Documentary Issues and Special Audience Programming. Other episodes were finalists in the categories of Live or Live to Tape and Magazine.

== Notable guests ==
Keith Stattenfield is a regular guest on the show. Other notable guests have been author Scott Knaster, Lawrence Gowan of Styx, Timothy Drury of Whitesnake, musicians Jonathan Mann and Juno Award winning songwriter Christopher Ward, comedians Jim Short and Matt Kirshen, the mayor of Cupertino, California, and Apple engineers Daniel Kottke, Andy Hertzfeld, and Steve Wozniak.
