= Clare College, Cambridge =

College of the University of Cambridge

Clare College
- University of Cambridge
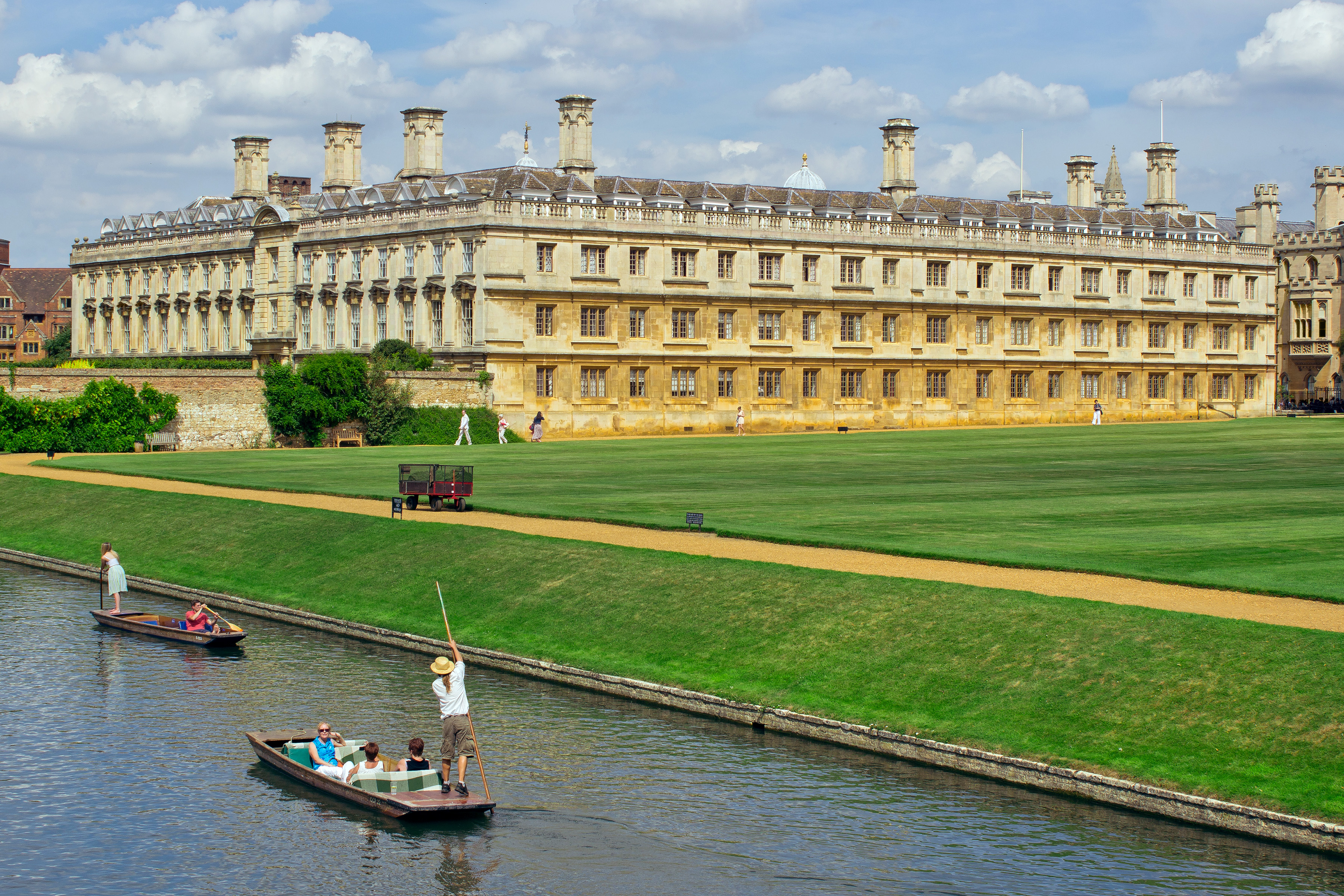
- Old Court, Clare College

- Arms: see below
Scarf colours: black, with two equally-spaced narrow yellow stripes
- Location: Trinity Lane (map)
- Coordinates: 52.2052°N 0.1150°E
- Abbreviation: CL
- Established: 1326; 700 years ago
- Named after: Elizabeth de Clare
- Former names: University Hall (1326–38); Clare Hall (1338–1856)
- Sister colleges: Oriel College, Oxford; St Hugh's College, Oxford
- Master: Loretta Minghella
- Undergraduates: 484 (2022–23)
- Postgraduates: 266 (2022–23)
- Newspaper: Clareification
- Endowment: £187.5M (2024)
- Visitor: Chancellors of the University ex officio
- Website: www.clare.cam.ac.uk
- UCS: ucs.clare.cam.ac.uk
- MCR: mcr.clare.cam.ac.uk/about-the-mcr
- Boat club: Clare Boat Club

Map
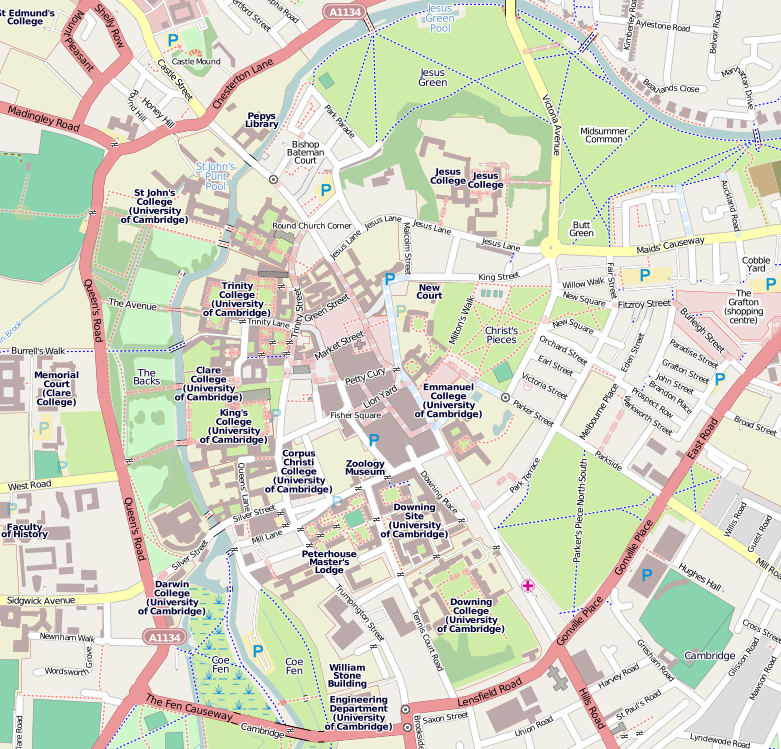
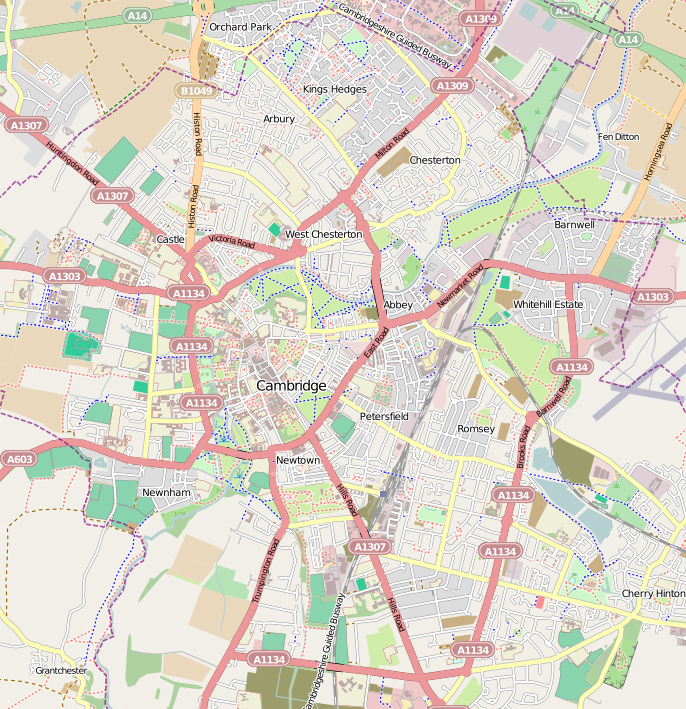
- Location within Central Cambridge Location within Cambridge

Clare College is a constituent college of the University of Cambridge in Cambridge, England. The college was founded in 1326 as University Hall, making it the second-oldest surviving college of the University after Peterhouse. It was refounded in 1338 as Clare Hall by an endowment from Elizabeth de Clare, and took on its current name in 1856. Clare is well-known for its chapel choir and for its gardens on the Backs (the rear of the colleges that overlook the River Cam). It is a registered charity.

== History ==
The college was founded in 1326 by the university's chancellor, Richard Badew, and was originally named 'University Hall'. Providing maintenance for only two fellows, it soon hit financial hardship. In 1338, the college was refounded as 'Clare Hall' by an endowment from Elizabeth de Clare, a granddaughter of Edward I, which provided for twenty fellows and ten students.

The college was known as Clare Hall until 1856, when it changed its name to 'Clare College'. (A new 'Clare Hall' was founded by Clare College as a postgraduate institution in 1966.)

Women were accepted as undergraduates in 1972, one of the first three previously all-male colleges to do so.

=== Coat of arms ===
The coat of arms of Clare College are "Or, three chevronels gules, impaling Or, a cross gules; all within a bordure sable guttee d'Or."

Elizabeth de Clare's first husband was John de Burgh (1286–1313). Usually, the arms of the husband appear in the dexter half, the position of greater honour, here occupied by the arms of de Clare. This shield with its bordure of gouttes d'or (golden droplets) appears on the personal seal of Elizabeth de Clare.

== Buildings ==
=== Old Court ===
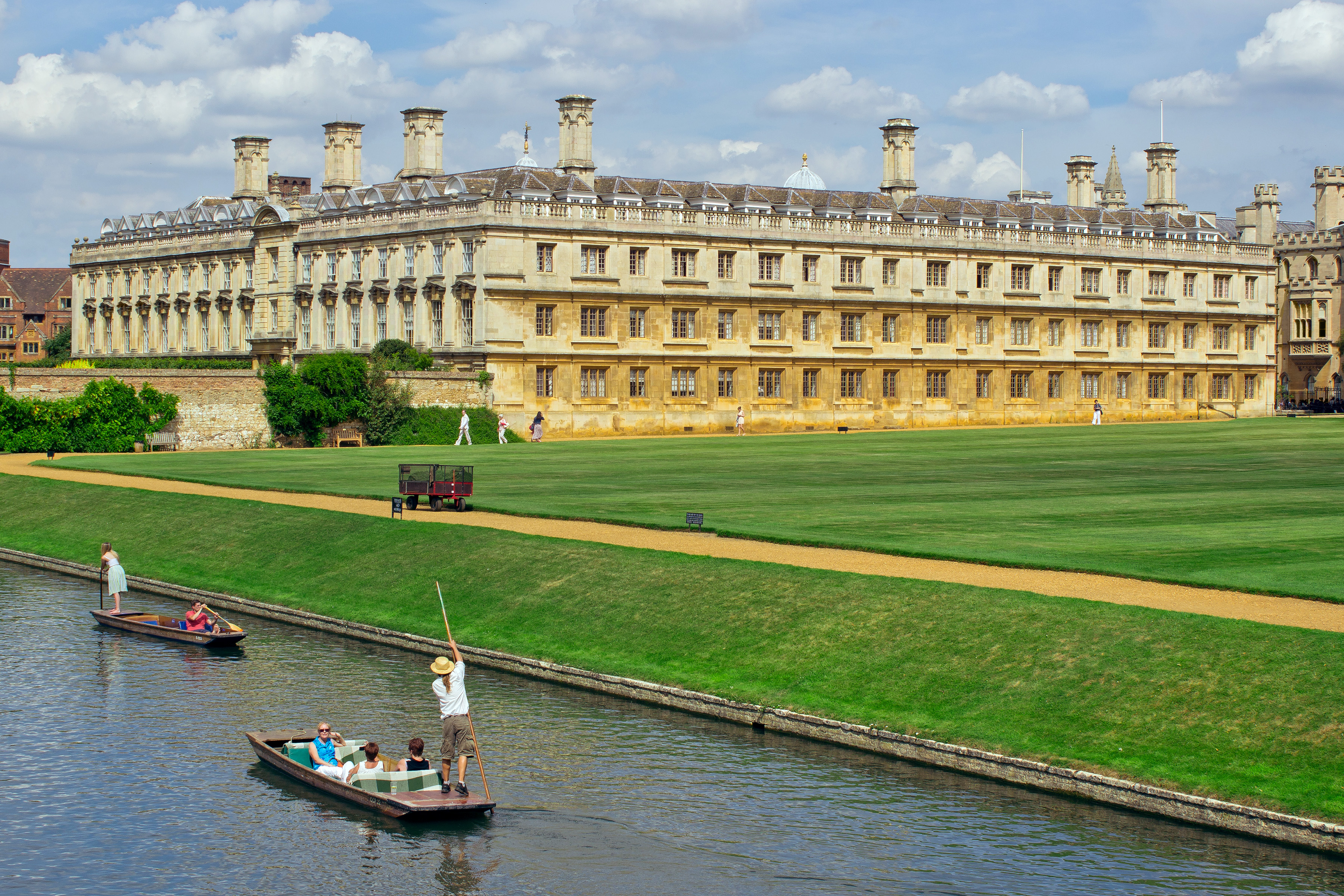
Old Court from King's College Bridge

Clare's Old Court, a Grade I listed building, was built between 1638 and 1715, with a long interruption for the English Civil War. The period spans the arrival of classicism into the mainstream of British architecture, such that its progress can be traced in the marked differences between the oldest wing to the north, which still has vaulting and other features in the unbroken tradition of English Gothic architecture, and the final southern block, which shows a fully articulated classic style.

The college's chapel was built in 1763 and designed by Sir James Burrough, the Master of neighbouring Gonville and Caius College. Its altarpiece is Annunciation by Giovanni Battista Cipriani.

Old Court frames King's College Chapel in views from the Backs.

The River Wing addition to Old Court by architects Witherford Watson Mann received a 2026 RIBA National Award and was shortlisted for the 2026 Stirling Prize.

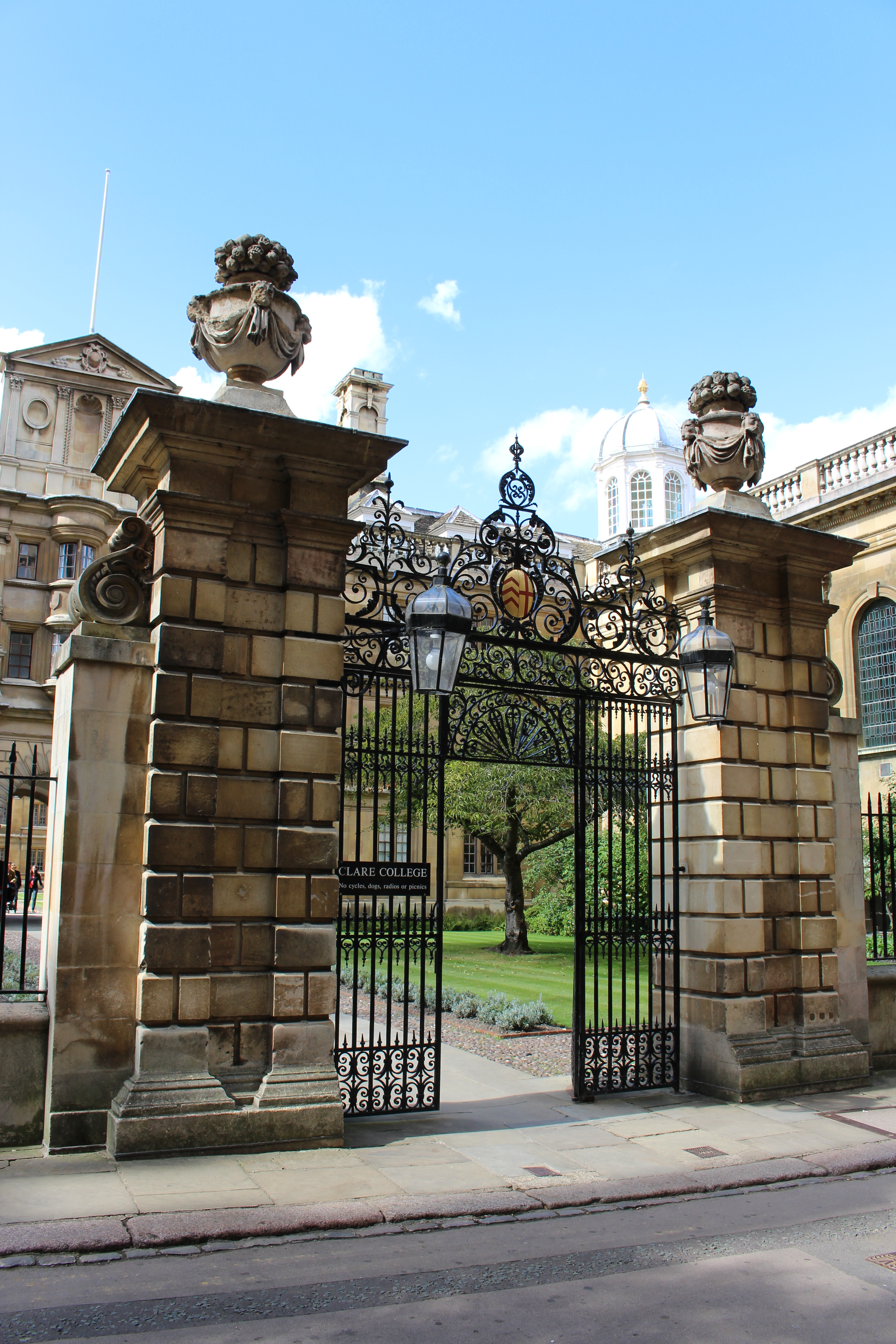
Clare College Gate

=== Clare Bridge ===
Clare has a bridge over the River Cam and is the oldest of Cambridge's current bridges. It was built of stone in 1640 by Thomas Grumbold and restored in 1969, and is a Grade I listed building.

Fourteen stone balls decorate it, one of which has a missing section. A number of apocryphal stories circulate concerning this – one cited by members of the college is that the original builder of the bridge was not paid the full amount for his work and so removed the segment to balance the difference in payment. A more likely explanation is that a wedge of stone cemented into the ball as part of a repair job became loose and fell out.

=== Memorial Court ===
Clare Bridge connects Old Court to Memorial Court, which was designed by Giles Gilbert Scott and dedicated in 1926. The new court, west of Queen's Road, was conceived as a memorial to the Clare men who lost their lives in the First World War. The monumental arch which forms the entrance to the court accommodates a large bell and carries the names of Clare alumni who died in both world wars. Memorial Court is Grade II* listed

Memorial Court was extended in the 1950s by the construction of Thirkill Court, and was later divided into two parts when the College's Forbes Mellon Library was constructed in the centre of Memorial Court; the new courtyard created in the west was renamed Ashby Court.

=== Lerner Court ===
A new court, Lerner Court, designed by van Heyningen and Haward Architects, was opened in January 2008. It occupies the last piece of undeveloped land in the central area of the College next to Memorial Court and houses a lecture theatre, catering, fellows offices, residential accommodation and a student laundry.

=== Castle Court ===
A detached area of student accommodation, Castle Court, is between Castle Street and Chesterton Lane, on Castle Hill, north of the city centre.

=== Gallery ===
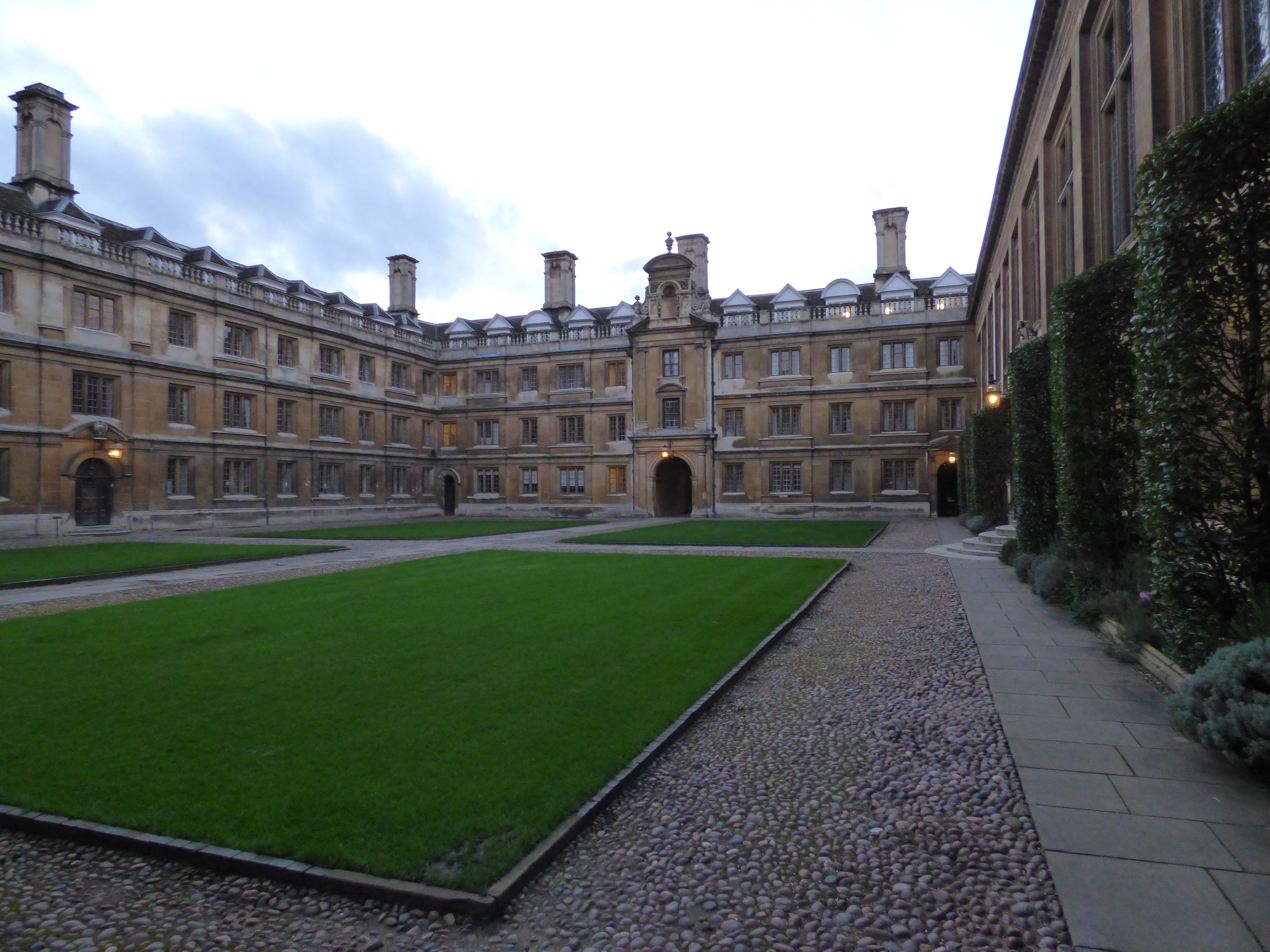
Old Court in Winter

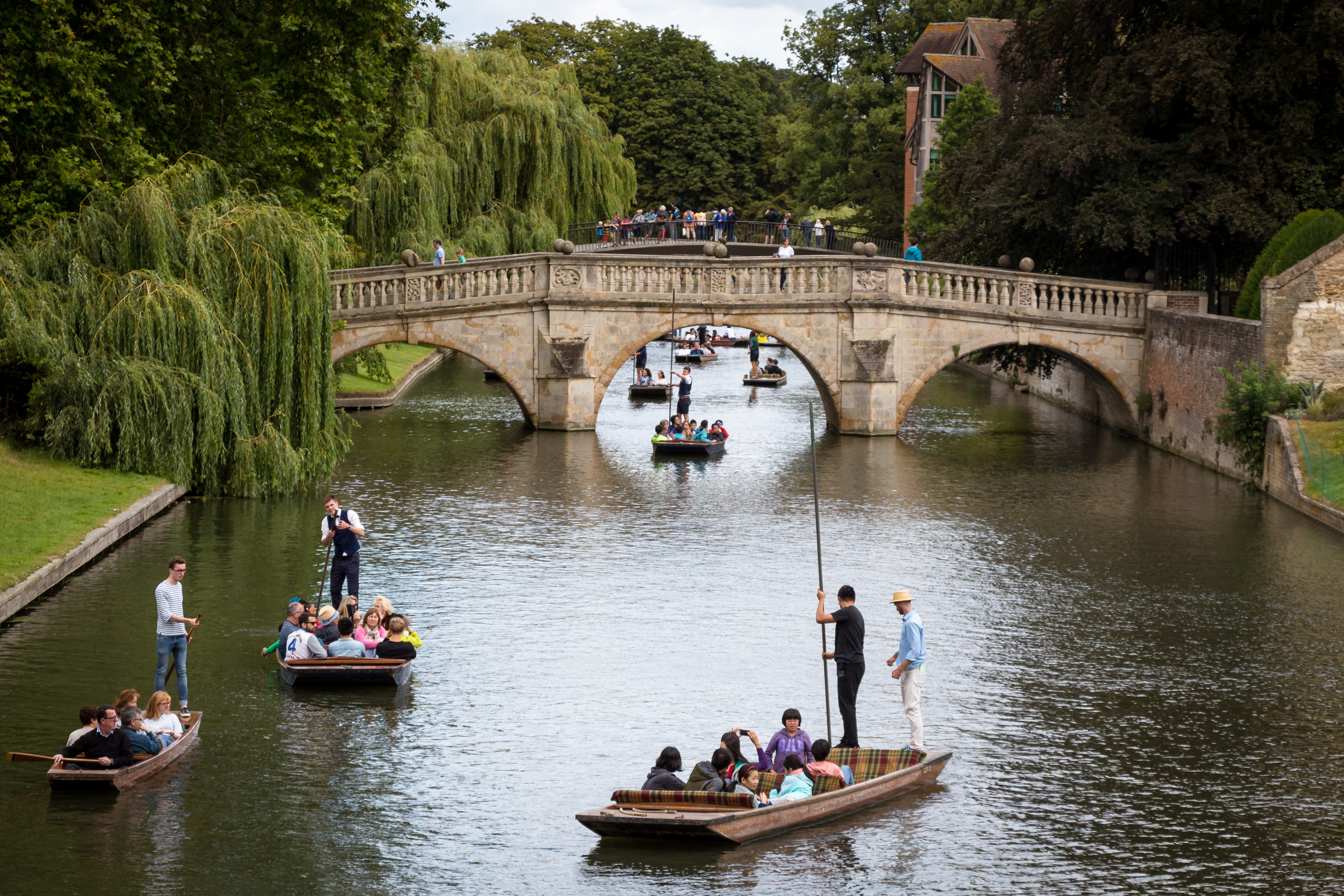
Clare Bridge, over the River Cam

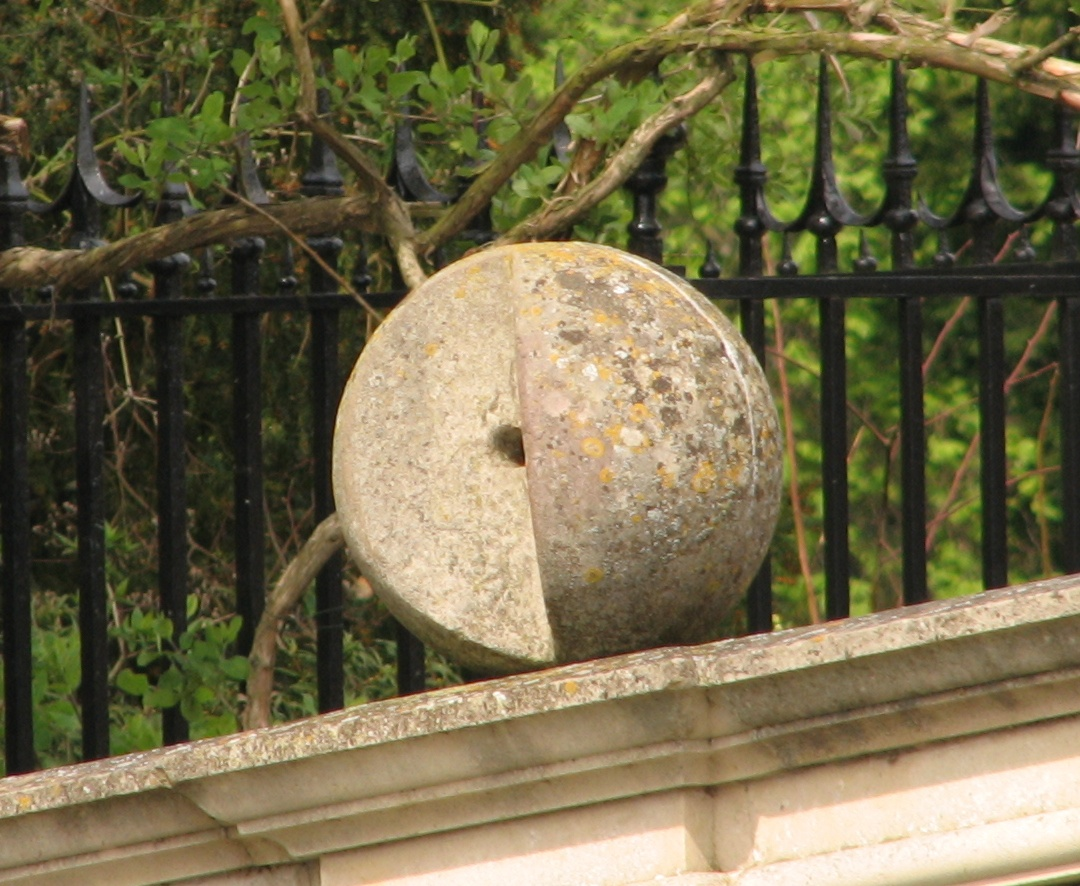
Clare Bridge's missing wedge

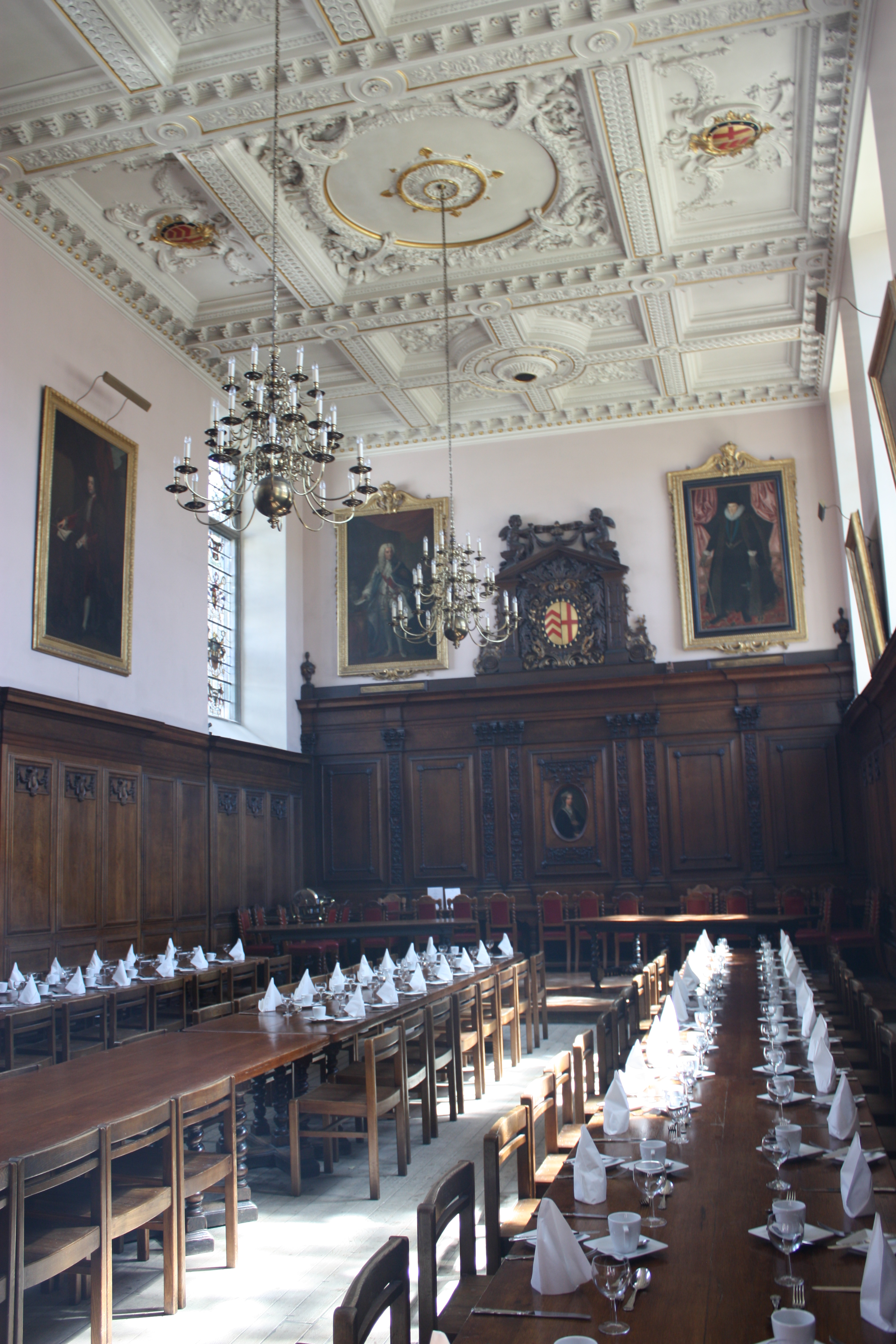
Inside the Great Hall

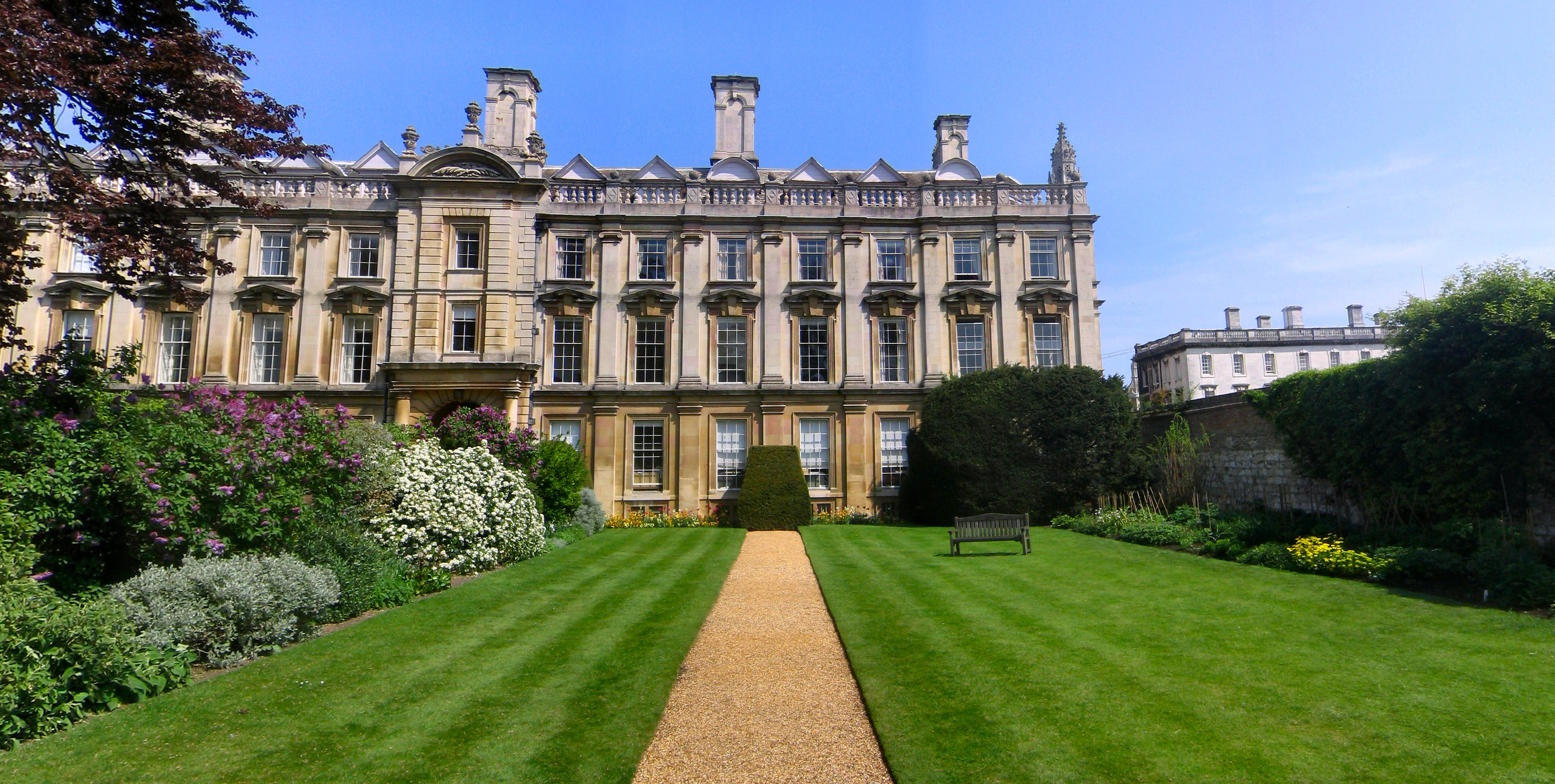
The Scholars' Garden

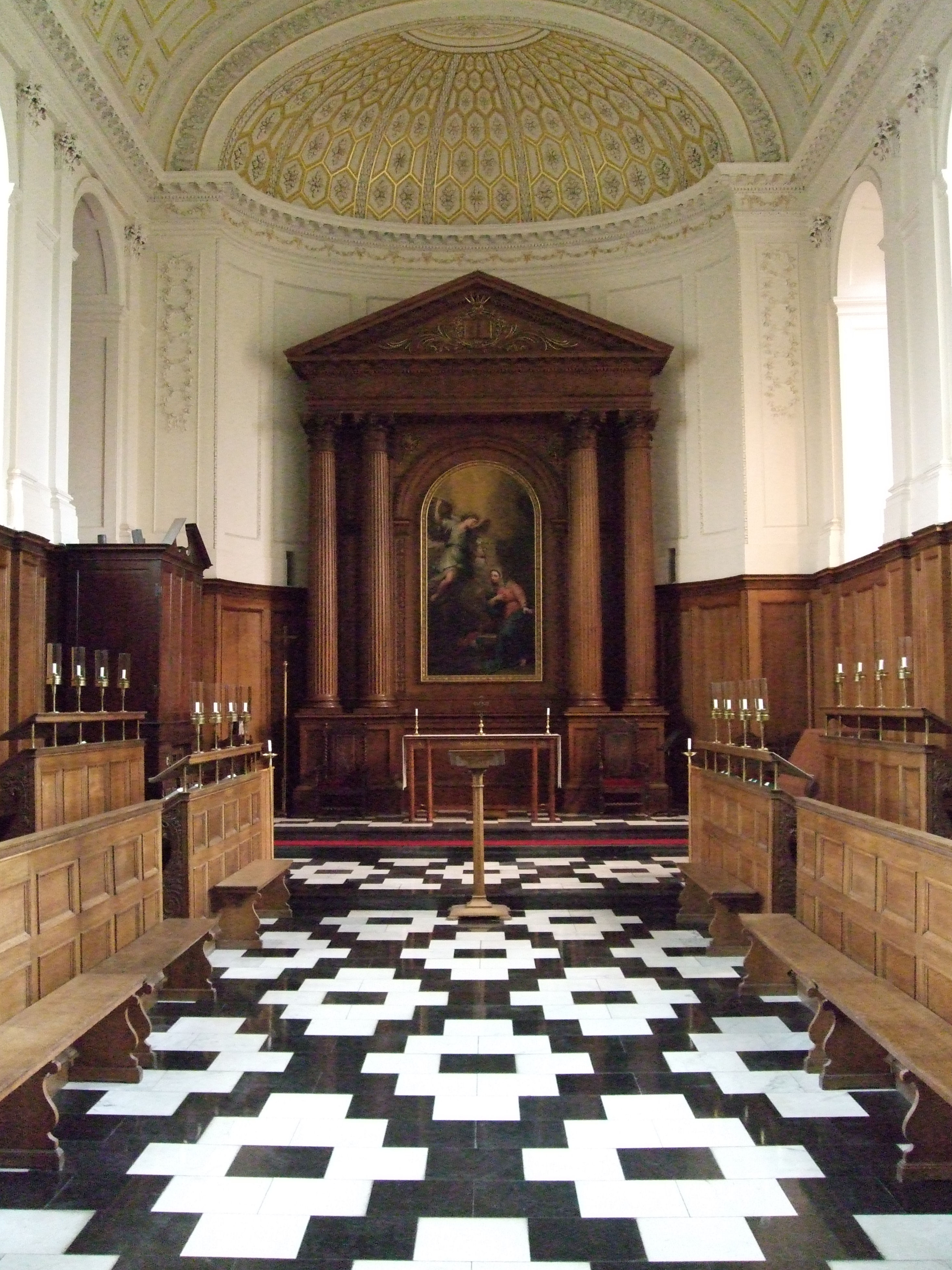
College chapel

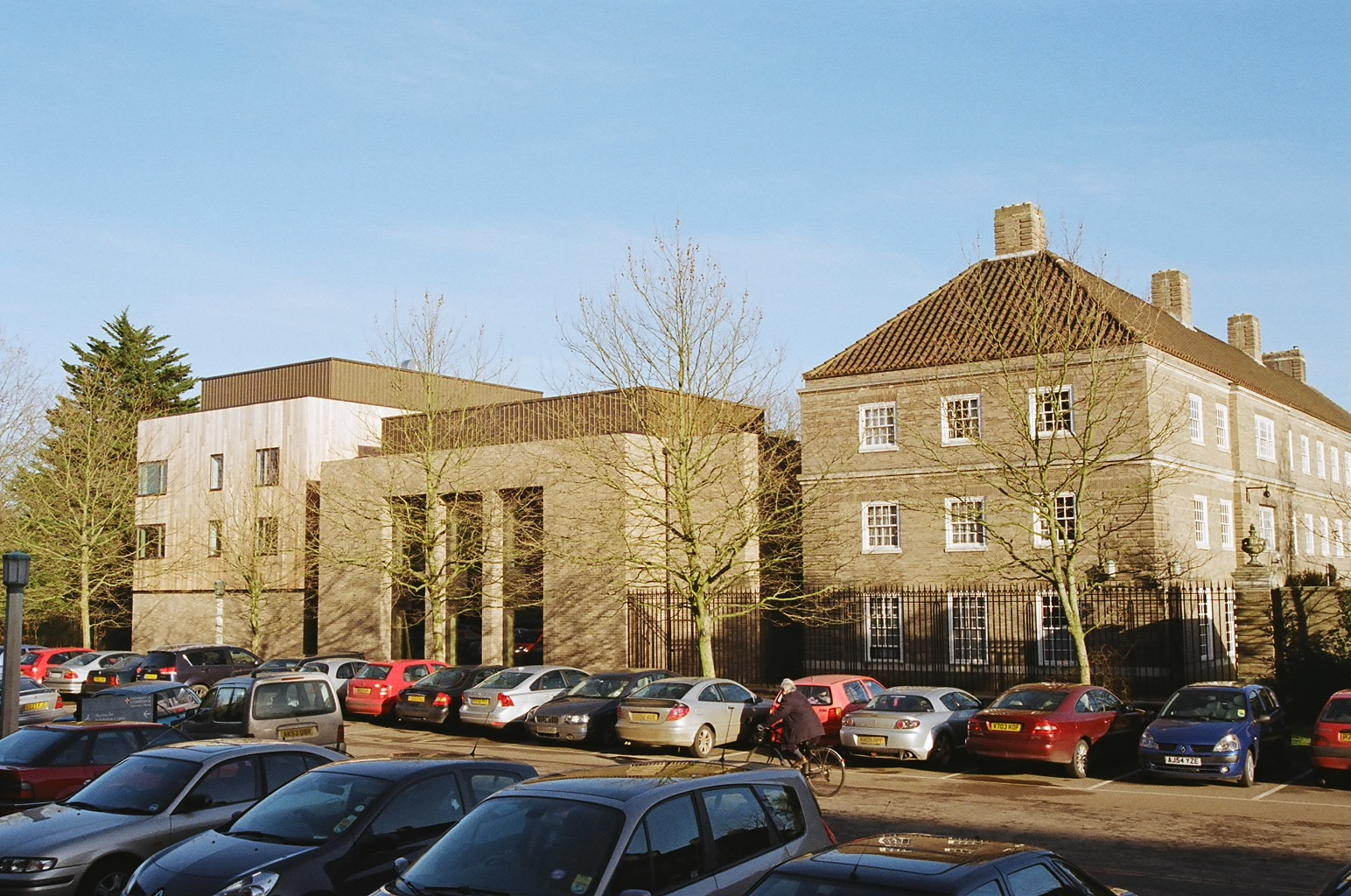
Lerner Court

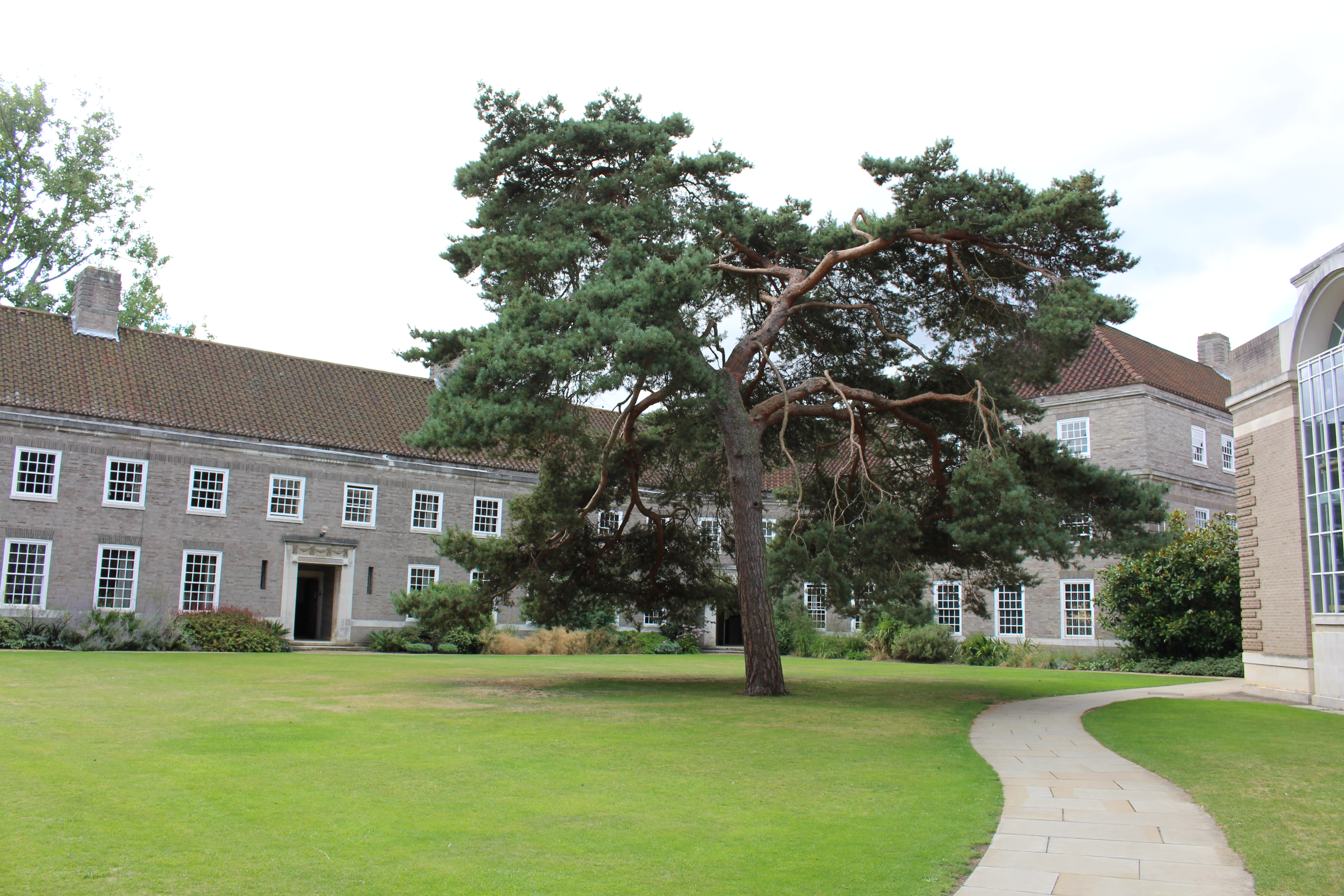
Memorial Court

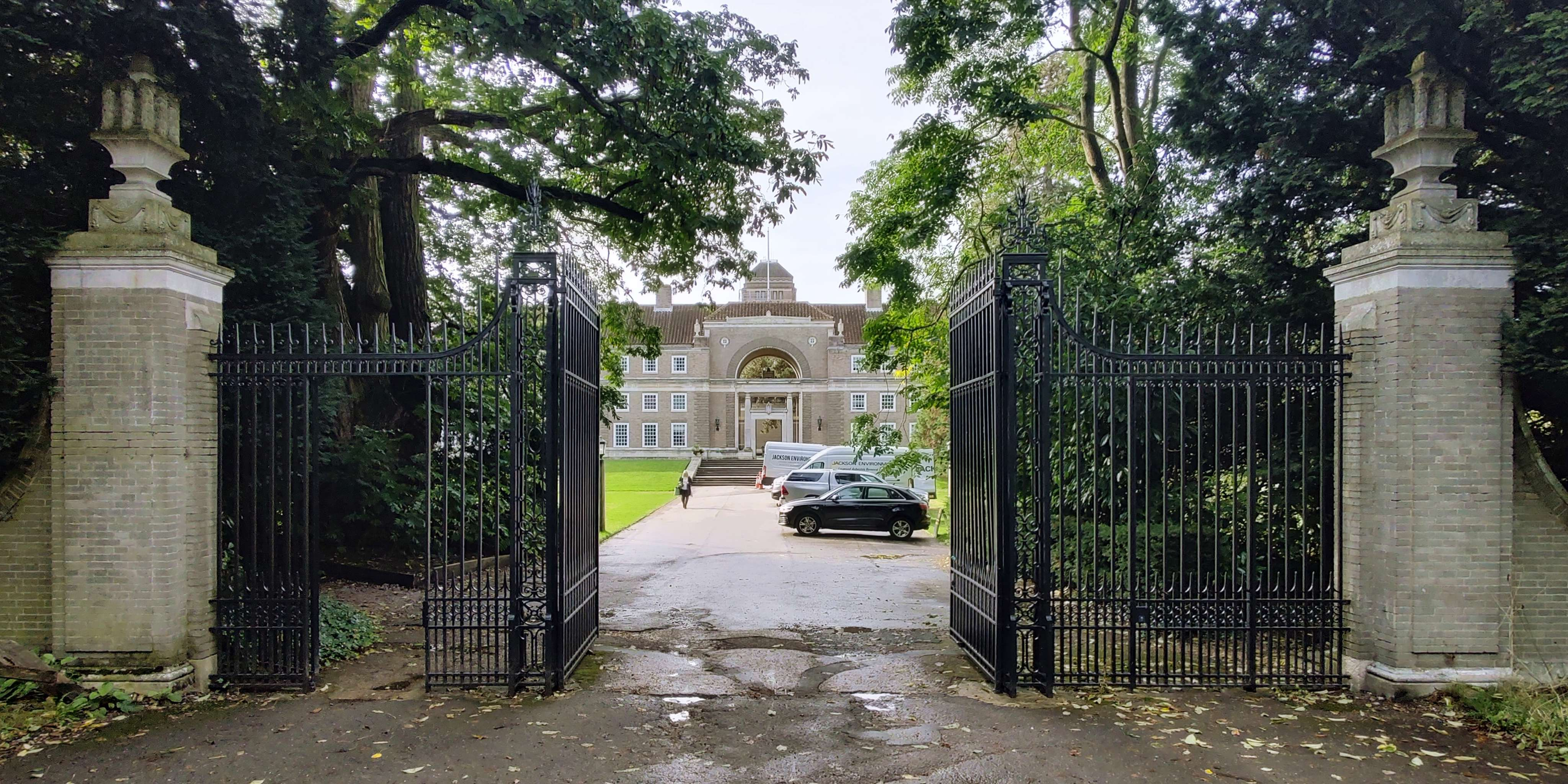
Memorial Court viewed from Queen's Road

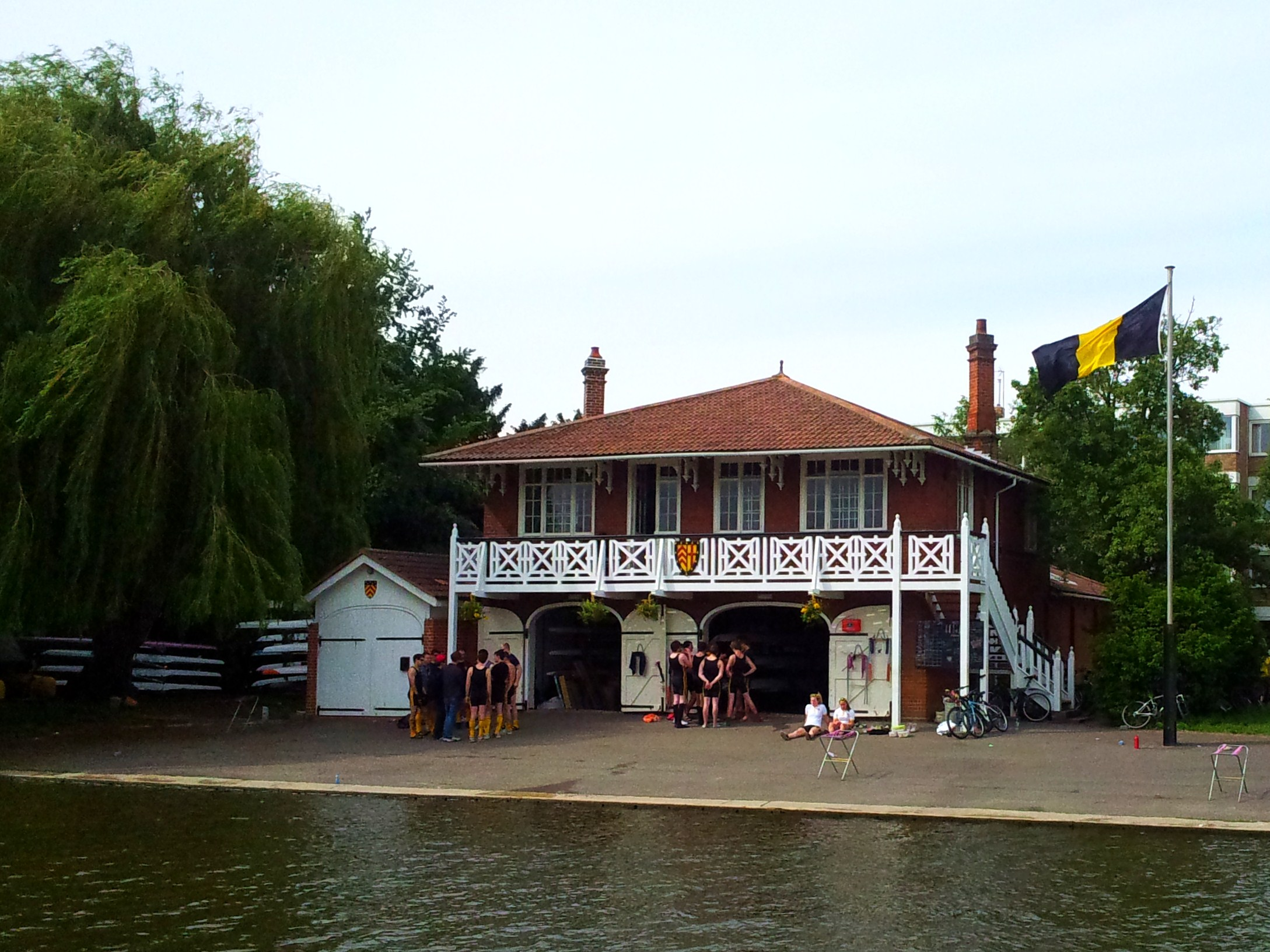
Clare College boathouse

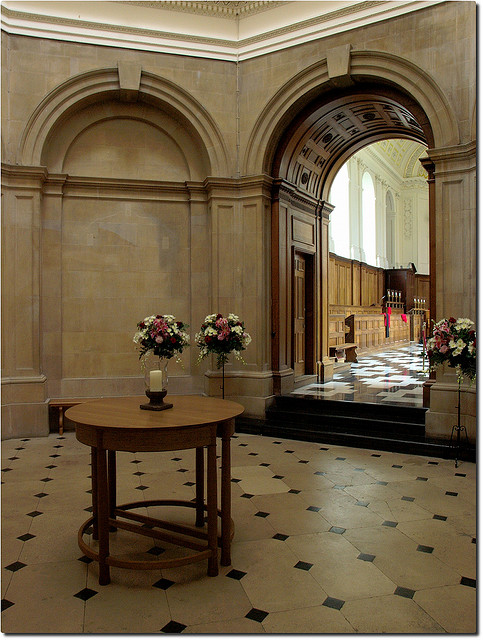
Clare College chapel

== Student life ==
In 1972, Clare College became one of the three male Cambridge colleges to admit female undergraduates (the other two being Churchill and King's).

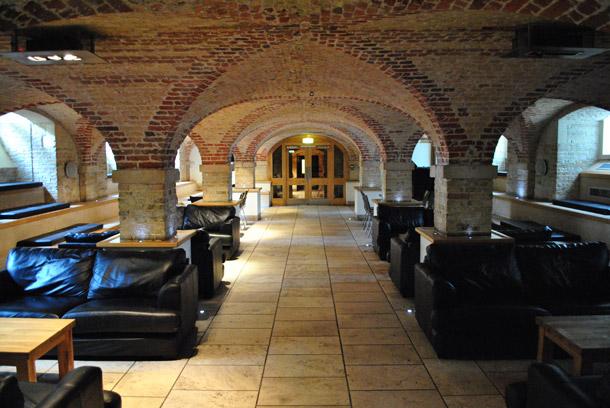
Clare College Bar

Clare is known as a musical college in Cambridge. Its choir has performed all over the world. Clare College Music Society is well known, particularly the orchestra. As well as jazz and comedy nights, Clare is known for Clare Ents, a student night held every Friday in term time. The night is popular among students across the university, and in the past, it has hosted acts such as Tinie Tempah, Bombay Bicycle Club, and Chase & Status.

The college's student newspaper is called Clareification.

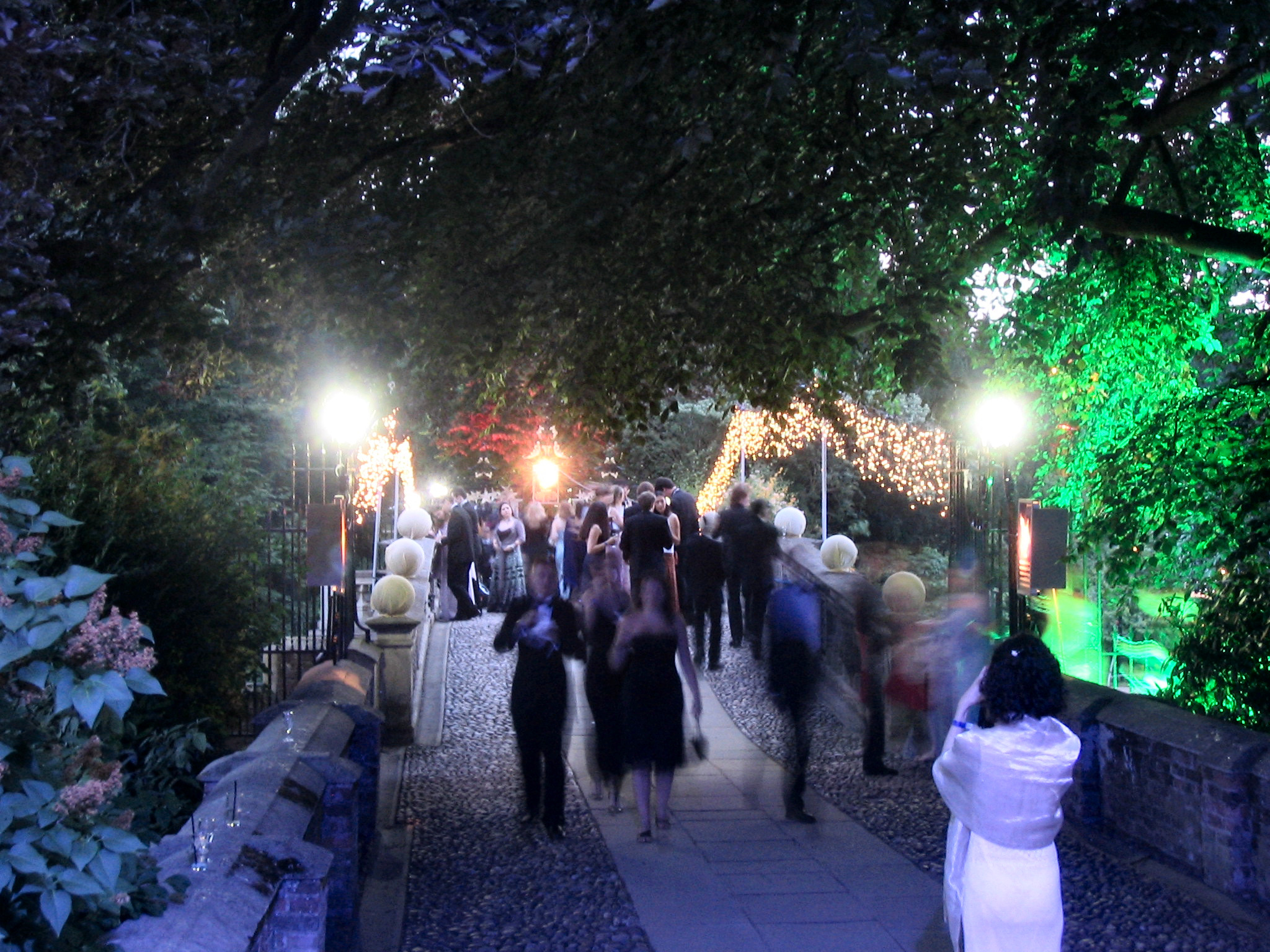
Clare hosts an annual May Ball, during which the college is lavishly decorated.

Clare holds an annual May Ball on the Monday of May Week in the middle of June.

=== Clare Boat Club ===
Clare Boat Club is the rowing club for current members of Clare College. There is a separate club, De Burgh Boat Club, for alumni. In 2012, Clare Boat Club had the highest membership relative to the size of its student body of any college-affiliated boat club in Cambridge, fielding six men's VIIIs in the May Bumps competition.

== Academic performance ==
The undergraduates of Clare College were 12th in the 2024 Tompkins Table, based on degree results.

Clare was in the top ten colleges in the Tompkins Table from 2000 to 2005. However, their performance in the following years (2006–09) was poorer, leaving them in 12th in 2006 and 18th in 2009. Their 2010 performance (8th position) however showed an increase of 10 places over their previous year's performance, and in 2011 they reached fourth place. In 2018, Clare placed 16th out of 29 colleges recorded in the table. In 2019, it fell to 24th place. In 2022, it rose to 12th place.

Entrance into Clare College is competitive, with approximately five applicants per place. However, the high quality of applicants means that many of them are awarded places at other colleges through the Winter Pool. Of applicants in 2007, 151 were given offers by Clare, and a further 75 applicants were made offers at other Cambridge colleges.

== People associated with Clare College ==
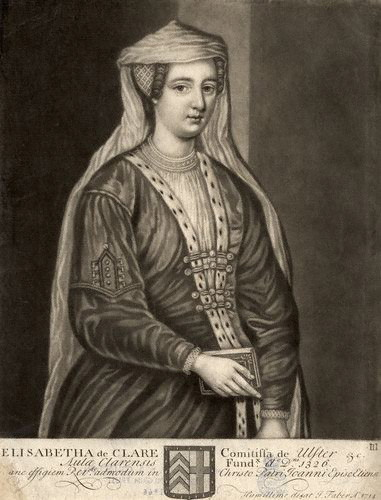
Elizabeth de Clare, 11th Lady of Clare, writer, founder, and patron

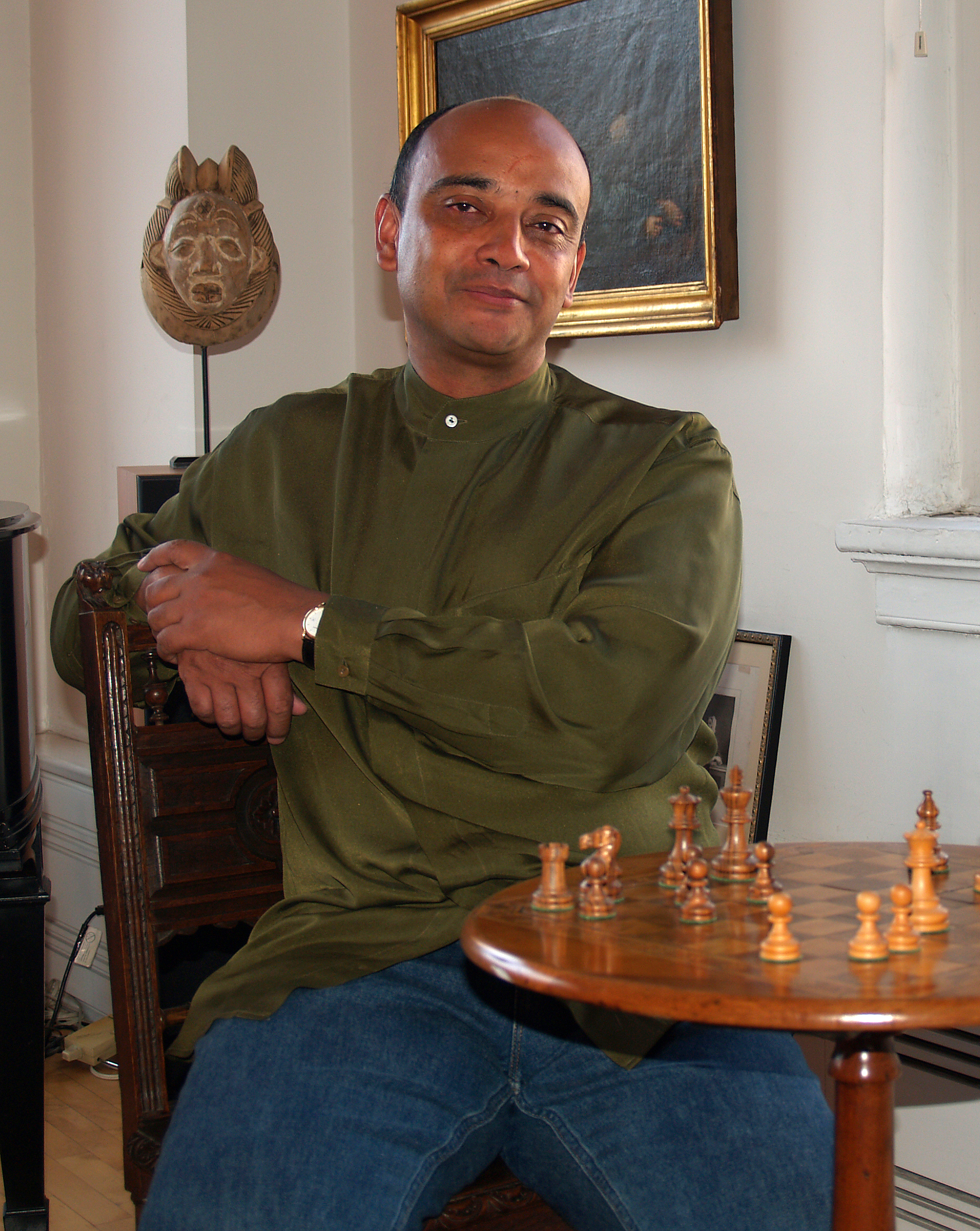
Kwame Anthony Appiah, philosopher, cultural theorist, and novelist

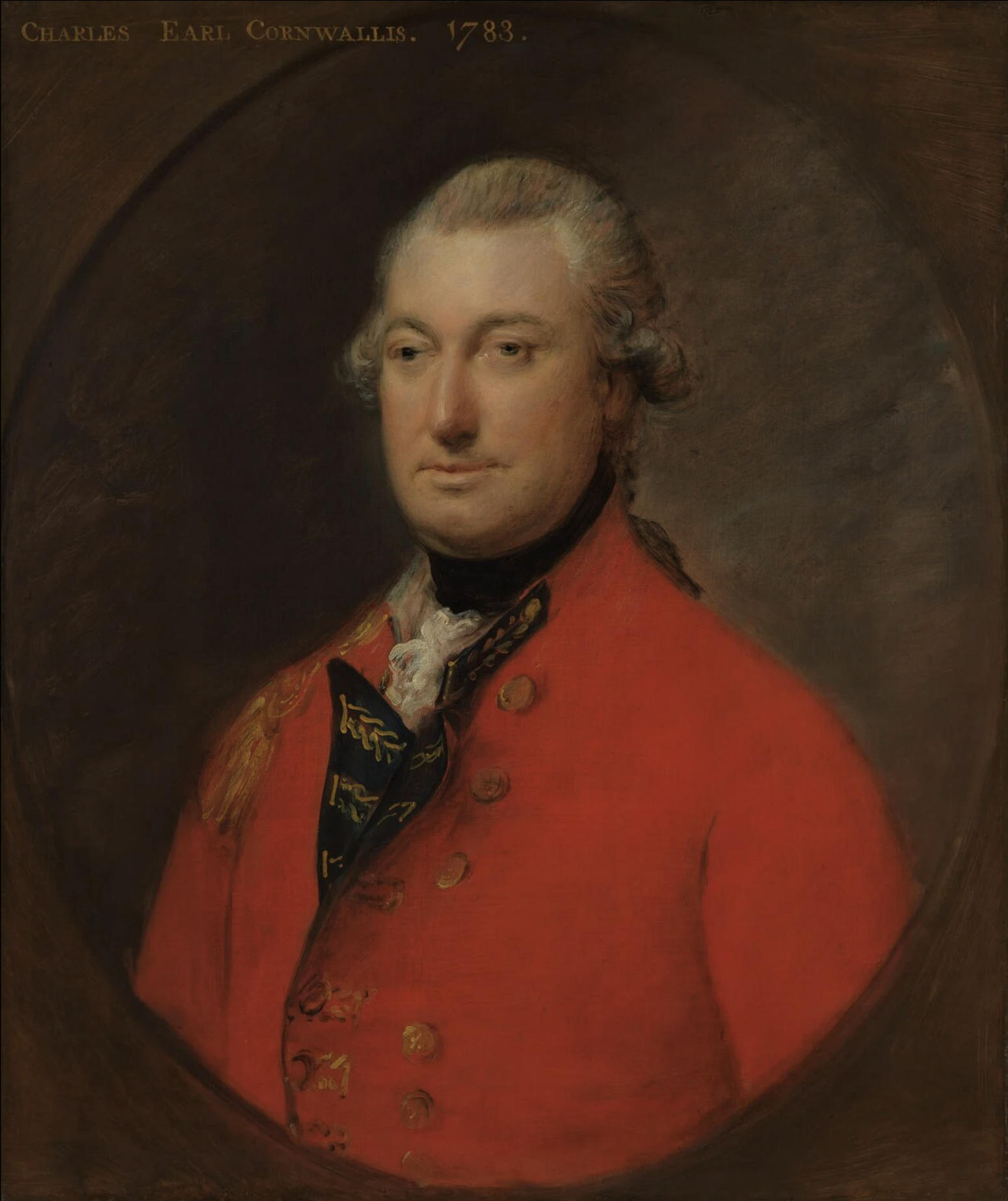
Charles Cornwallis, 1st Marquess Cornwallis, British Army officer

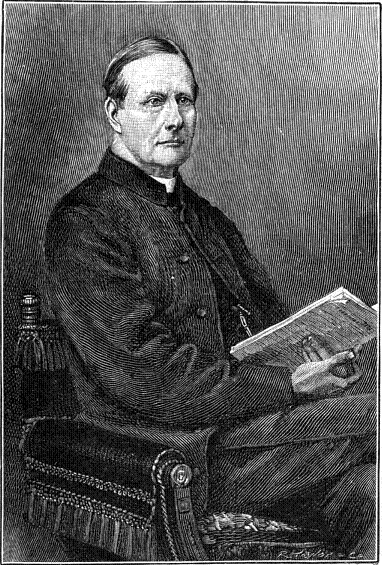
Sabine Baring-Gould, Anglican priest and novelist

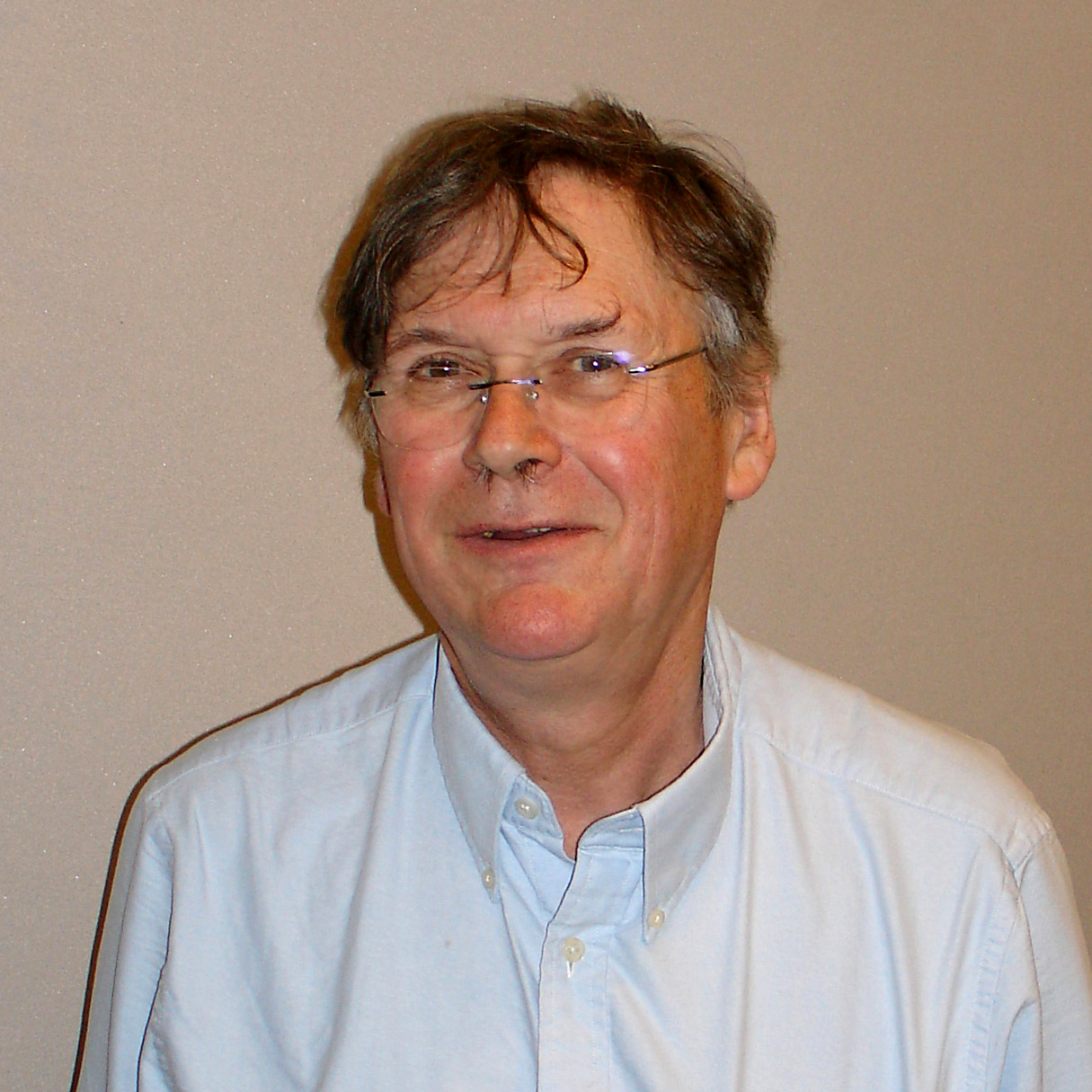
Sir Tim Hunt, biochemist and physiologist

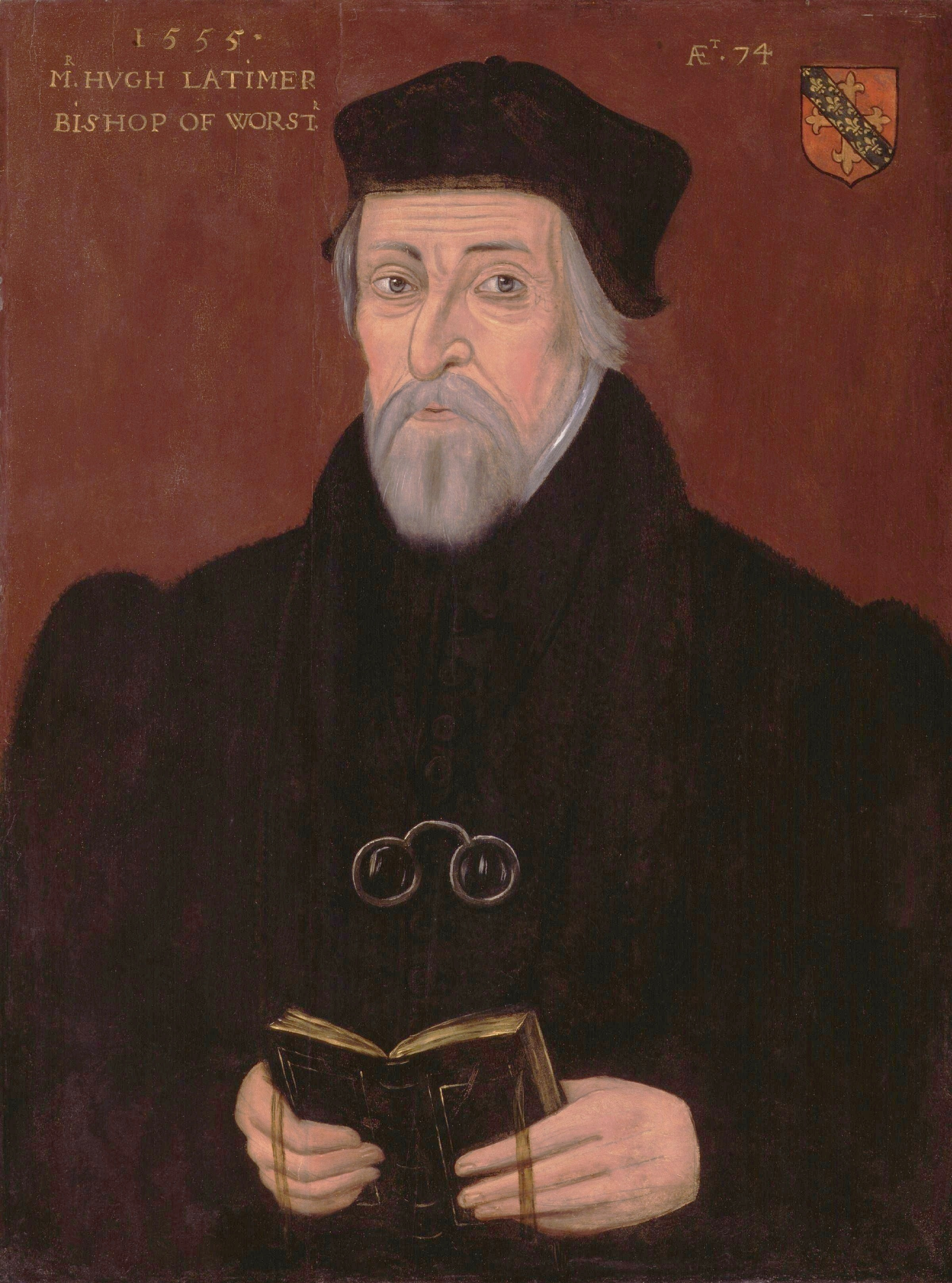
Hugh Latimer, Bishop of Worcester, Oxford Martyr of Anglicanism

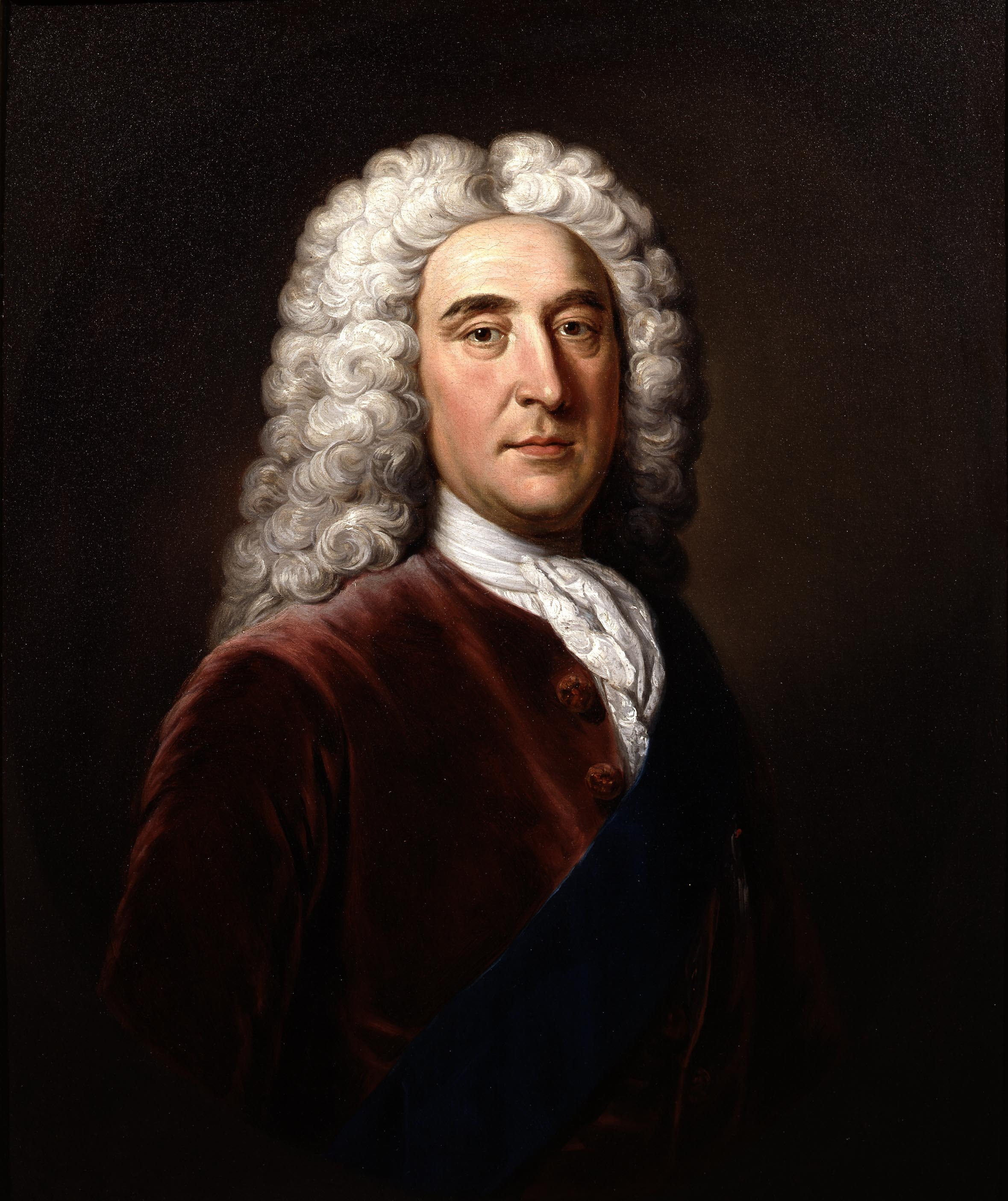
Thomas Pelham-Holles, 1st Duke of Newcastle, former Prime Minister of the United Kingdom

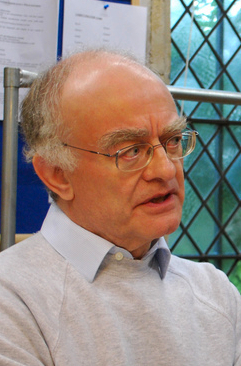
John Rutter, musician, composer and conductor

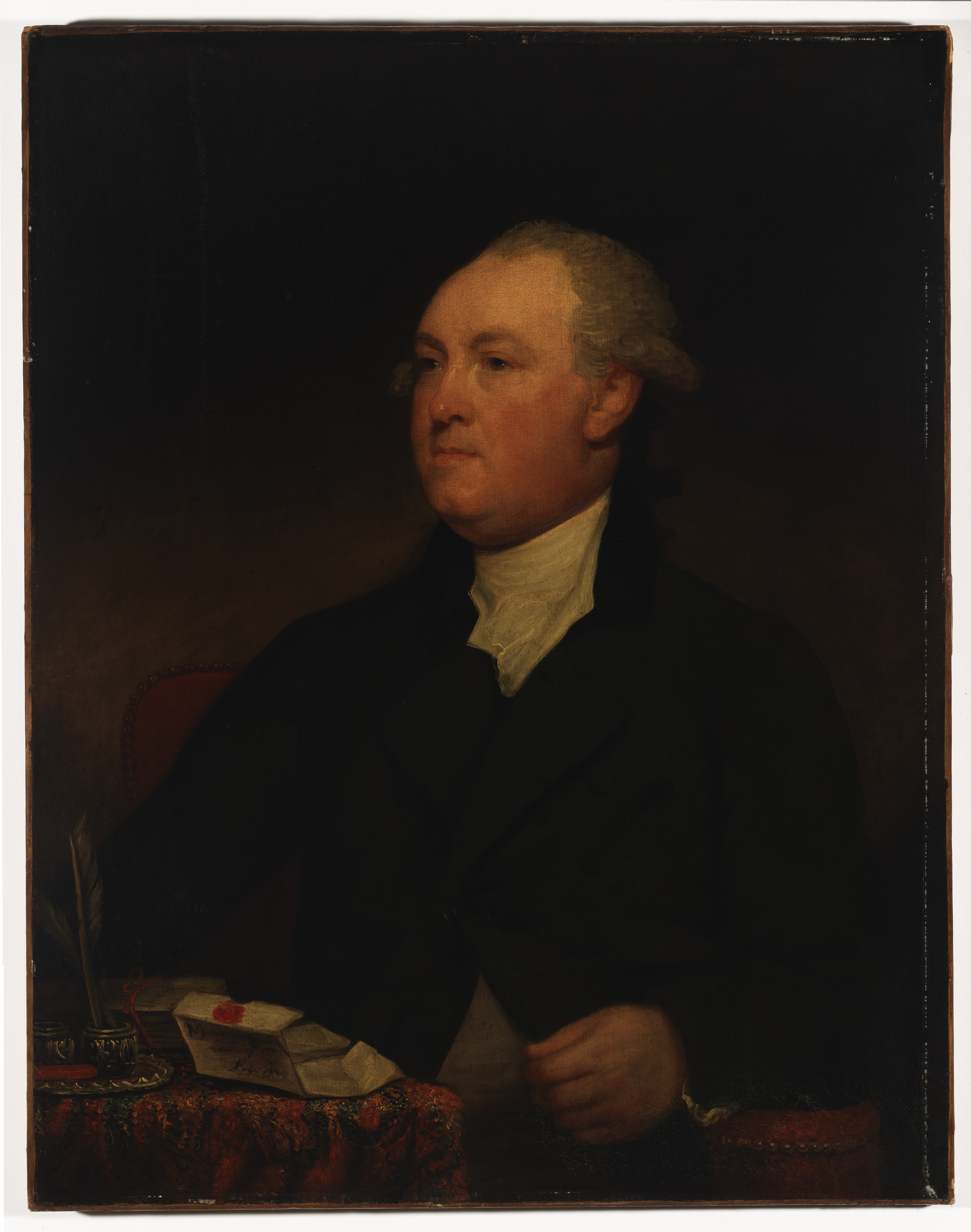
Thomas Townshend, 1st Viscount Sydney, former Home Secretary

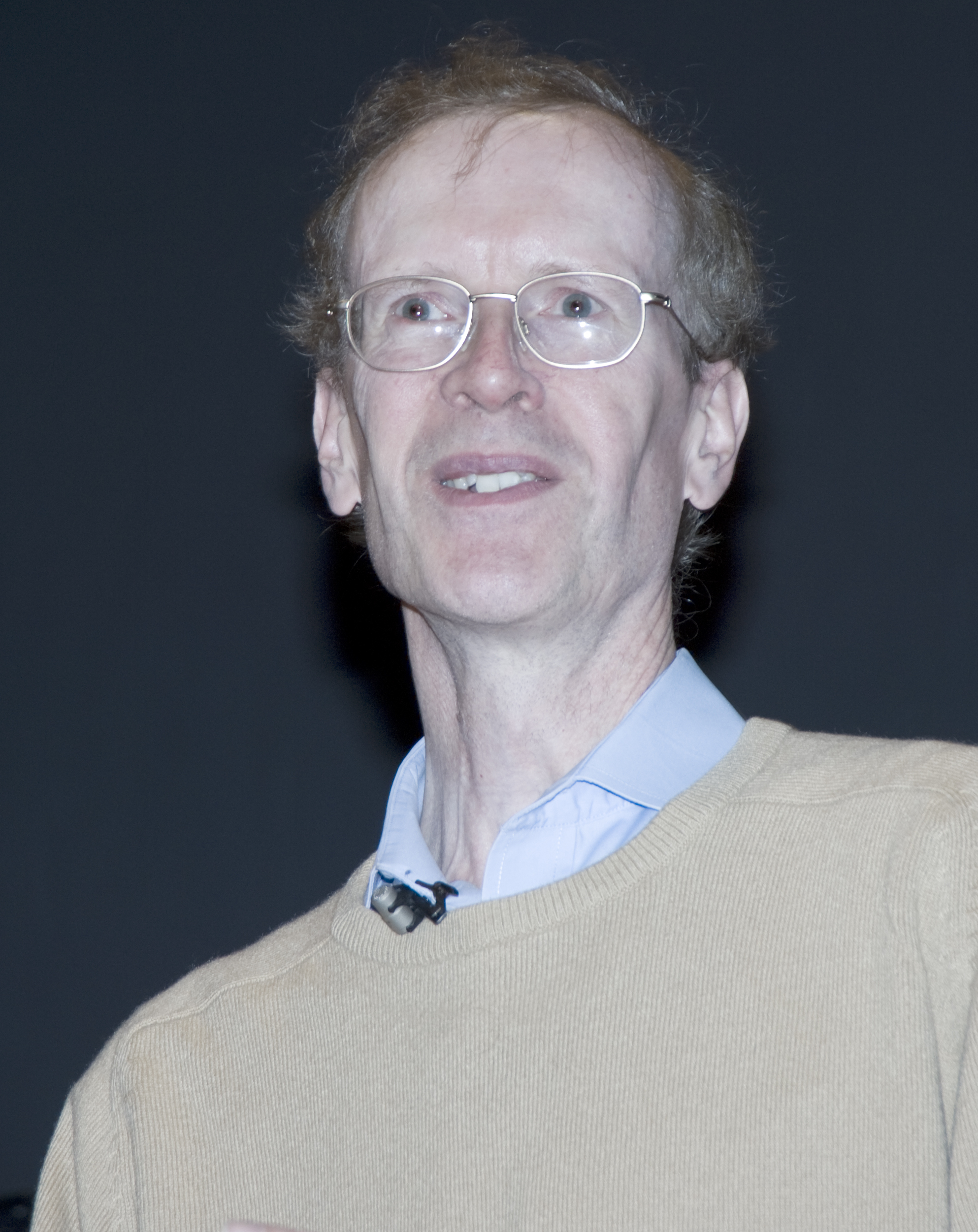
Sir Andrew Wiles, mathematician, solved Fermat's Last Theorem

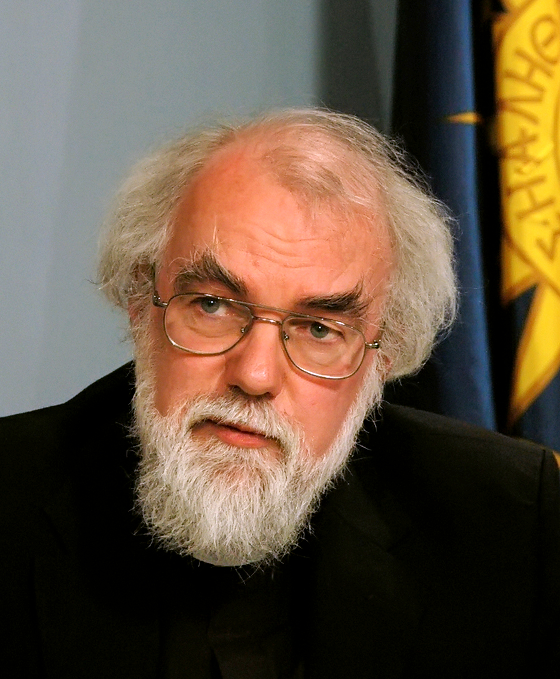
Rowan Williams, Baron Williams of Oystermouth, a Welsh Anglican bishop, theologian, and poet

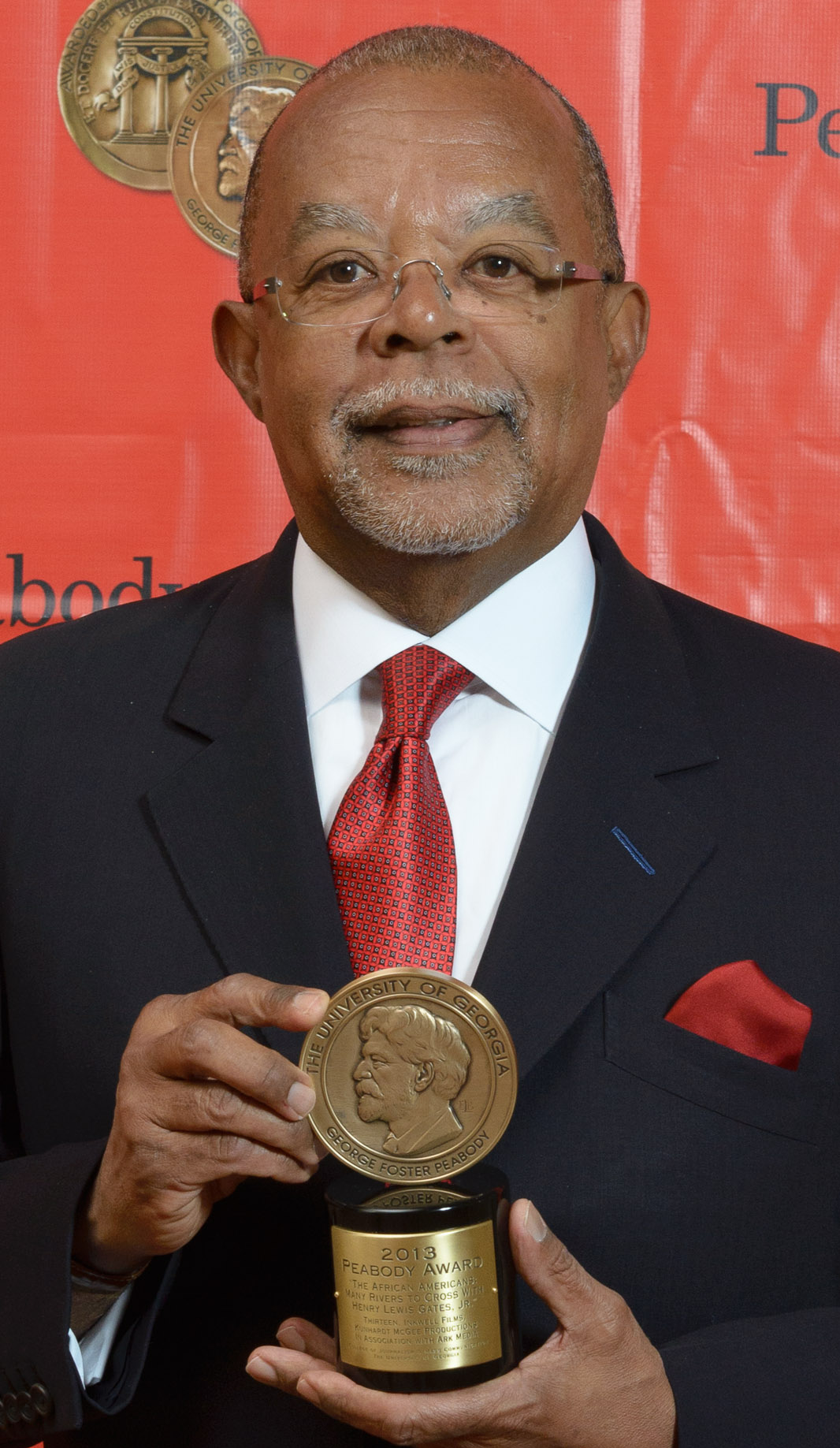
Henry Louis Gates Jr., American historian and filmmaker

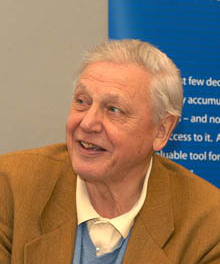
Sir David Attenborough, naturalist, historian, and broadcaster

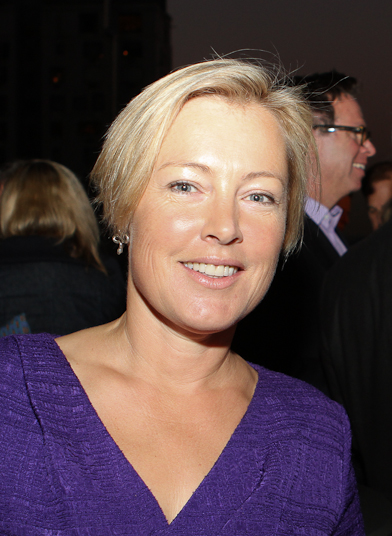
Gillian Tett, financial journalist and author

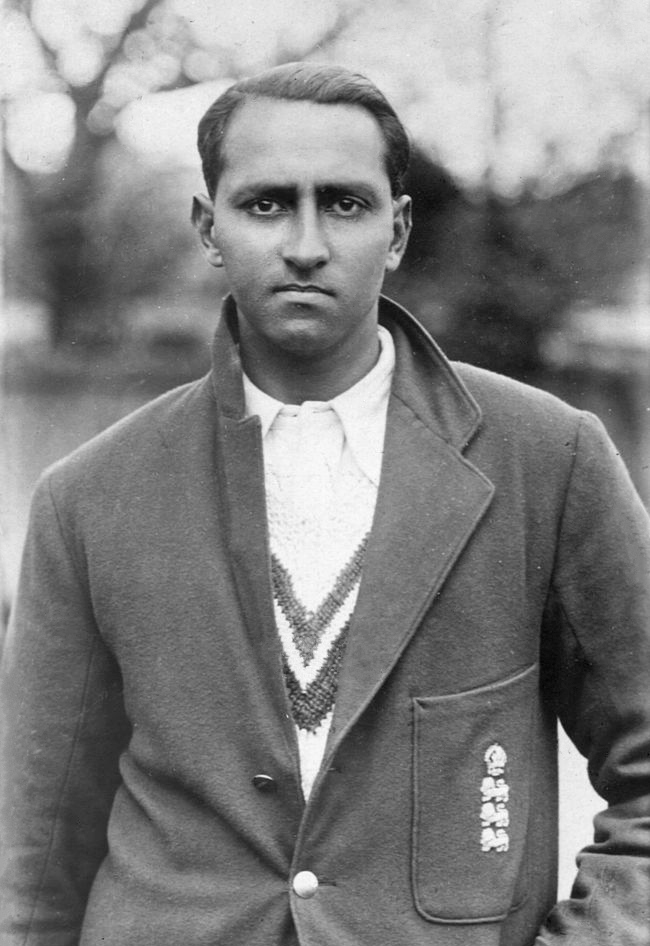
Duleepsinhji, cricketer and Indian public servant

== See also ==
- A Clare Benediction (1998), an anthem by John Rutter
- Category:Alumni of Clare College, Cambridge
- Category:Fellows of Clare College, Cambridge
- Listed buildings in Cambridge (west)
