= List of The Late Late Show with Craig Ferguson episodes (2005) =

- No. of episodes: 156

Release
- Original network: CBS

Season chronology
- ← Previous Next → 2006 episodes

This is the list of episodes for The Late Late Show with Craig Ferguson in 2005.

== 2005 ==
=== January ===
No.	Original release date	Guest(s)	Musical/entertainment guest(s)
1	January 3, 2005	David Duchovny, Nicole Sullivan	N/A
One of Ferguson's first guests is Nicole Sullivan, coincidentally the first woman Ferguson dated when he came to the United States from Scotland in 1994.
2	January 4, 2005	Jon Cryer, Sophie Okonedo	Keb' Mo'
3	January 5, 2005	Julian McMahon, Aisha Tyler	Howie Day performed "Colide" from Stop All the World Now
4	January 6, 2005	Jason Alexander, Hau Thai-Tang	The Donnas performed "I Don't Want to Know (If You Don't Want Me)" from Gold Medal
5	January 7, 2005	Jeremy Piven	G. Love
6	January 10, 2005	John Goodman, Emmy Rossum	N/A
Ferguson performed in a sketch as Super Mario.
7	January 11, 2005	Little Richard, William H. Macy	Little Richard performs "Baby What You Want Me to Do" from 1966's The Wild and Frantic Little Richard, and "Tutti Frutti" from 1955's Here's Little Richard
8	January 12, 2005	James Woods, Amanda Bynes	Comedian Jim Short
9	January 13, 2005	Teri Polo, Eddie Steeples	Wyclef Jean
10	January 14, 2005	Patricia Arquette, Peter Guber, Peter Bart	N/A
11	January 17, 2005	Renée Fleming	Mos Def performs "The Painties" from The New Danger
12	January 18, 2005	Regis Philbin, Rob Morrow	Billy Bragg performs ""Waiting for the Great Leap Forwards" from Workers Playtime
13	January 19, 2005	Minnie Driver, Candace Bushnell	N/A
14	January 20, 2005	Samuel L. Jackson, Maria Bello	Collective Soul performs "How Do You Love" from Youth
15	January 21, 2005	Tara Reid, Crispin Glover	The Ditty Bops perform "There's a Girl" from their self-titled album
16	January 24, 2005	Jim Belushi, Kim Raver	DramaGods perform "So'k" from Love
17	January 25, 2005	Famke Janssen, Joe Montana	Comedian Richard Jeni
18	January 26, 2005	Blythe Danner	Comedian Stewart Francis
19	January 27, 2005	Ice Cube, Steve Jones	French Kicks perform the title track from The Trial of the Century
20	January 28, 2005	Vanessa L. Williams, Scott Wolf	Razorlight performs "Somewhere Else" from Up All Night
21	January 31, 2005	Katey Sagal, Christine Barrett, Jake Shears	Scissor Sisters performed "Filthy/Gorgeous" from their self-titled album

=== February ===
No.	Original release date	Guest(s)	Musical/entertainment guest(s)
22	February 1, 2005	John Larroquette, Jennifer Finnigan	Comedian Rickey Smiley
23	February 2, 2005	Joe Mantegna, Stan Lee	Emma Bunton perform "Crickets Sing for Anamaria"
24	February 3, 2005	Peter Gallagher, Laila Ali	...And You Will Know Us by the Trail of Dead perform "The Rest Will Follow" from Worlds Apart
25	February 4, 2005	Jeff Gordon, Philip Daniel Bolden	Comedian Andrew Donnelly
26	February 7, 2005	Patti LaBelle, Imelda Staunton	Night Ranger perform "Sister Christian" from Midnight Madness
27	February 8, 2005	Randy Jackson, Samantha Daniels	Comedian Greg Proops
28	February 9, 2005	Laura Linney, Barry Watson, Laura Margolis, Kevin O'Connell	N/A
29	February 10, 2005	Star Jones, Amber Valletta	The Zutons perform "Confusion" from Who Killed...... The Zutons?
30	February 11, 2005	Alan Alda, Tori Spelling	Steve Earle performs "The Revolution Starts" from The Revolution Starts... Now
31	February 14, 2005	Jane Seymour, Paul Haggis	Bright Eyes perform "Road to Joy" from I'm Wide Awake, It's Morning
32	February 15, 2005	Mimi Rogers, James Denton, Courtney Hansen	N/A
33	February 16, 2005	Jennifer Beals, David Krumholtz	Interpol perform "Evil" from Antics
34	February 17, 2005	Sean Astin, Kathryn Morris	Madeleine Peyroux performs "Dance Me to the End of Love" from Careless Love
35	February 18, 2005	Julian Fellowes, Janet Ferguson, Andy Dick,	Comedian Paul Gilmartin
Ferguson's mother, Janet Ferguson visits LA sites with Wu Tang Clan's RZA
36	February 21, 2005	Bob Schieffer, John C. McGinley	Ani DiFranco performs "Recoil" from Knuckle Down
37	February 22, 2005	Peter Boyle, Jenna Morasca, Ethan Zohn	Brian McKnight performs "Everything I Do" from Gemini
38	February 23, 2005	Thomas Haden Church, Don King	Comedienne Maria Bamford
39	February 24, 2005	Jami Gertz, Steven Wright	Sum 41 perform "No Reason" from Chuck
40	February 25, 2005	Faye Dunaway, Andrew Wight	Nuttin' But Stringz perform the title track from Dance with My Father
41	February 28, 2005	Amy Brenneman	Paul Westerberg performs "As Far as I Know" from Another Year on the Streets, Vol. 3

=== March ===
No.	Original release date	Guest(s)	Musical/entertainment guest(s)
42	March 1, 2005	Don Rickles, Missy Elliott	Judith Owen performs "These Foolish Things"
43	March 2, 2005	Jeff Probst, Emily Mortimer	Comedian Danny Bhoy
44	March 3, 2005	Juliette Binoche, Lara Logan, Stanley Bing	N/A
45	March 4, 2005	Jennifer Love Hewitt, Dave Foley, Ali Costello	Unwritten Law performs "Save Me (Wake Up Call)" from Here's to the Mourning
46	March 14, 2005	Joan Collins, Phil Keoghan	The Blue Nile performs "I Would Never" from High
47	March 15, 2005	Drew Carey, Lawrence Block	The Hollow Men perform "Pink Panther"
48	March 16, 2005	Kevin Pollak, Maureen Dowd	Deana Carter performs "One Day at a Time" from The Story of My Life
49	March 21, 2005	Michael Chiklis, Tony Hawk	Nic Armstrong & The Thieves performed "I Can't Stand It"
50	March 22, 2005	Sam Elliott, Amy Yasbeck	Comedian Bob Marley
51	March 23, 2005	Andie MacDowell, Gerard Butler	Kathleen Edwards performs the title track from Back to Me
52	March 28, 2005	Wendie Malick, Chris Klug	Lisa Loeb performs "Catch the Moon" from The Way It Really Is
53	March 29, 2005	Robert Rodriguez, Stone Cold Steve Austin	k-os performs "Crabbuckit" from Joyful Rebellion
54	March 30, 2005	Carmen Electra, Nick Stahl	Lang Lang
55	March 31, 2005	Bernie Mac, Mädchen Amick, Rachael Scdoris	N/A

=== April ===
No.	Original release date	Guest(s)	Musical/entertainment guest(s)
56	April 1, 2005	Carla Gugino, Regina King, Elon Gold	N/A
57	April 4, 2005	Jimmy Smits	Moby performs "Lift Me Up" from Hotel
58	April 5, 2005	Michael Clarke Duncan, Mary McCormack	Comedienne Becky Pedigo
59	April 6, 2005	Ron Livingston, Dave Gorman	Jesse McCartney performs "She's No You" from Beautiful Soul
60	April 11, 2005	Amber Tamblyn, Jason Lee, Steven Hensley	N/A
61	April 12, 2005	Eric Idle, Rulon Gardner	Comedian Mike Birbiglia
62	April 13, 2005	Sara Rue, Matthew Polly	Aqualung performs "Brighter Than Sunshine" from Still Life
63	April 14, 2005	Fran Drescher, Anton Yelchin	Shooter Jennings performs "4th of July" from Put the "O" Back in Country
64	April 15, 2005	David Duchovny, Ryan Reynolds	Dinosaur Jr. performs "The Lung" from You're Living All Over Me
65	April 25, 2005	Suzanne Somers, Erykah Badu, Billy Miles	N/A
66	April 26, 2005	Thandie Newton, Barb MacLeod	N/A
67	April 27, 2005	Paul Haggis, Michael Gelbart	Gavin Rossdale performs "The Current" from The Complex
68	April 28, 2005	Rosie O'Donnell, Akiane Kramarik	N/A
69	April 29, 2005	Anjelica Huston, Danny Pino	The Futureheads perform "Hounds of Love" from their self-titled album

=== May ===
No.	Original release date	Guest(s)	Musical/entertainment guest(s)
70	May 2, 2005	Jonathan Rhys Meyers, Ben Stein	Kasabian performs "Cutt Off" from their self-titled album
71	May 3, 2005	Bill Maher, Rain Pryor	Comedian Stewart Francis
72	May 4, 2005	Gary Sinise, Dean Karnazes	Ben Folds performs "Landed" from Songs for Silverman
73	May 5, 2005	Ozzy Osbourne, Allison DuBois	Brendan Benson performs "What I'm Looking For" from The Alternative to Love
74	May 6, 2005	Jim Caviezel, Phil Lesh	Eels performs "Hey Man (Now You're Really Living)" from Blinking Lights and Other Revelations
75	May 9, 2005	Mark Harmon, Rza	Joss Stone performs "Spoiled" from Mind, Body & Soul
76	May 10, 2005	Rose McGowan, Dr. Sanjay Gupta	Charlie Daniels performs a song from Songs From the Longleaf Pines
77	May 11, 2005	Kermit the Frog, Leelee Sobieski	Tori Amos performs "Sleeps with Butterflies" from The Beekeeper
78	May 12, 2005	Bill Pullman, Ruth Reichl	Spoon performs "Sister Jack" from Gimme Fiction
79	May 13, 2005	Wanda Sykes, Eric Bogosian	N/A
80	May 16, 2005	Mike Huckabee, Marlee Matlin	John Butler Trio performs "Something's Gotta Give"
81	May 17, 2005	Joe Walsh, George Eads	Junior Brown performs a song from Down Home Chrome
82	May 18, 2005	Sela Ward, Michael Tucker	Acceptance performs "In Too Fair" from Phantoms
83	May 19, 2005	Phil McGraw	Ringside performs "Tired of Being Sorry" from their self-titled album
84	May 20, 2005	Randy Jackson, Bai Ling, Gary Greff	N/A
85	May 23, 2005	Ann Coulter, Amber Mariano, Rob Mariano	Comedian Charles Ross
86	May 24, 2005	Alice Cooper, Malachy McCourt	Dierks Bentley performs "Settle for a Slowdown" from Modern Day Drifter
87	May 25, 2005	Donny Osmond, Peter Bart	Robert Cray performs the title track from Twenty
88	May 26, 2005	Rachael Leigh Cook, Chuck Palahniuk	Layzie Bone performs a song from The New Revolution
89	May 27, 2005	Seth Green, Tony Alva	The Daylights perform a song from Shift and Blur

=== June ===
No.	Original release date	Guest(s)	Musical/entertainment guest(s)
90	June 6, 2005	Jon Cryer, Garrison Keillor	Sound of Urchin performs a song from The Diamond
91	June 7, 2005	Marg Helgenberger, David Milch	Jaguares performs a song from Crónicas de un Laberinto
92	June 8, 2005	Dennis Hopper, Marianne Jean-Baptiste	Comedian Carlos Alazraqui
93	June 9, 2005	Ricky Schroder	Toby Keith performs "Honkytonk U" from Honkytonk University
94	June 10, 2005	Vivica A. Fox, Poppy Montgomery	Angie Stone performs "U-Haul" from Stone Love
95	June 13, 2005	Jason Lee, Drew Pinsky	Midlake performs "Mornings Will Be Kind"
96	June 14, 2005	Cheryl Ladd, Skeet Ulrich	Kaiser Chiefs performs "Everyday I Love You Less and Less"
97	June 15, 2005	Steven Wright, John F. Banzhaf III; Skit with James Adomian as George W. Bush	Comedian Steven Wright; Amos Lee performs "Keep It Loose, Keep It Tight" from his eponymous album
98	June 16, 2005	Tommy Hilfiger, Lea Thompson	Nikka Costa performs "Till I Get to You" from Can'tneverdidnothin'
99	June 17, 2005	Debbie Reynolds, Thomas Lennon, Nick Hornby	TBA
100	June 20, 2005	Allison Janney, Julian Sands	Rilo Kiley performs a song from More Adventurous
101	June 21, 2005	Peter Krause, David LaChapelle	Tracy Bonham performs "Shine" from Blink the Brightest
"Host-whisperer" Peter Lassally, veteran producer of The Tonight Show Starring Johnny Carson and for David Letterman takes over the day-to-day running of the show as executive producer. Lassally was largely responsible for hiring Ferguson and had been coaching him in his new role.
102	June 22, 2005	John Waters, Loretta Devine	Comedian Demetri Martin
103	June 23, 2005	Mimi Rogers, James Ellroy	Brooke Valentine performs "Girlfight" from Chain Letter
104	June 24, 2005	Jeremy Piven, Melissa Bank	Mike Jones performs "Flossin" from Who Is Mike Jones?
105	June 27, 2005	Bryan Cranston, Peter Guber	The Krumpers perform a dance routine
106	June 28, 2005	Amy Yasbeck, Ringo Starr	Ringo Starr and His All-Starr Band perform the title track from "Choose Love" and "I'm the Greatest" from his 1973 album Ringo
107	June 29, 2005	Kara Cooney	Dwight Yoakam perform a song from Blame the Vain
108	June 30, 2005	Jennifer Tilly, Corbin Bernsen, Leroy Chiao	TBA

=== July ===
No.	Original release date	Guest(s)	Musical/entertainment guest(s)
109	July 1, 2005	Tom Bergeron, Greg Nicotero	Billy Bragg performs a song from Volume 1
110	July 11, 2005	Julian McMahon, Rachel DeWoskin	The Crystal Method performs a song from Legion of Boom.
111	July 12, 2005	Dave Navarro, Marisa Marchetto	Comedian Ron Pearson
112	July 13, 2005	Tony Shalhoub, Jared Diamond	Raul Midón performs a song from State of Mind
113	July 14, 2005	Beau Bridges, Harry Eden	Comedienne Martha Kelly
114	July 15, 2005	John Larroquette, Dan Huber	Fountains of Wayne performs a song from Out-of-State Plates
115	July 18, 2005	Wolf Blitzer, Karina Lombard	Nellie McKay performs "Pasadena Girl" from the soundtrack of Rumor Has It...
116	July 19, 2005	Ludacris, Julie Warner	Comedian Ty Barnett
117	July 20, 2005	Dave Foley, Marc Horowitz	Tionne "T-Boz" Watkins and Rozonda "Chilli" Thomas from R U the Girl
118	July 21, 2005	Warren Faidley, Martin Mull	Chef Preston Clarke
119	July 22, 2005	Camryn Manheim, Elizabeth Banks	Crossfade performs "So Far Away" from Crossfade
120	July 25, 2005	Eddie Izzard, R. James Woolsey Jr.	Elkland performs a song from Golden
121	July 26, 2005	Peter Arnett, Isla Fisher	Comedienne Wendy Liebman
122	July 27, 2005	Joe Buck, Pauley Perrette	N/A
123	July 28, 2005	Dermot Mulroney, Paul Feig	N/A

=== August ===
No.	Original release date	Guest(s)	Musical/entertainment guest(s)
124	August 1, 2005	Cloris Leachman, Mark Zupan	Comedian Carlos Mencia
125	August 2, 2005	Jane Kaczmarek, John Carroll Lynch	Comedian Greg Proops
126	August 3, 2005	Joseph Fiennes, Julie Chen	Tracy Bonham performs "Did I Sleep Through It All?" from Blink the Brightest
127	August 4, 2005	Sharon Stone, Mo'Nique	N/A
128	August 5, 2005	Buzz Aldrin, Method Man, John Mendoza	N/A
129	August 8, 2005	Marilu Henner, David Feherty	N/A
130	August 9, 2005	Harland Williams, Evan Rachel Wood	Babyface performs the single "Reason for Breathing"
131	August 10, 2005	Kristin Chenoweth, Marc Cherry	Natasha Bedingfield performs "I Bruise Easily" from Unwritten
132	August 15, 2005	Hank Azaria, Wes Craven	N/A
133	August 16, 2005	Rachel Griffiths, Tommy Lasorda	Comedian D. C. Benny
134	August 17, 2005	Arianna Huffington, Gigi Grazer	Comedian Louis C.K.
135	August 18, 2005	Jami Gertz, Steve Howey	Missy Higgins performs the title track from The Sound of White
136	August 19, 2005	Steve Carell, Rashida Jones, Rick Lundblade	N/A
137	August 22, 2005	Carl Reiner, Rosa Blasi	Rufus Wainwright performs "The One You Love" from Want Two
138	August 23, 2005	Minnie Driver, Todd Zeile	N/A
139	August 24, 2005	Eric McCormack, Mitch Albom	N/A
140	August 25, 2005	Carrie Fisher, Terry McDermott	Our Lady Peace performs "Where Are You" from Healthy in Paranoid Times
141	August 26, 2005	Felicity Huffman, Stanley Bing	Last Train Home performs

=== September ===
No.	Original release date	Guest(s)	Musical/entertainment guest(s)
142	September 12, 2005	Neil Patrick Harris, Karen Fisher	Nickel Creek
143	September 13, 2005	Bruce Campbell, Melinda Clarke	Flight of the Conchords
144	September 14, 2005	Patricia Arquette, Connie Schultz	Paul Weller
145	September 15, 2005	Carla Gugino, Alice Cooper	N/A
146	September 16, 2005	Alyson Hannigan, Steve Jones	N/A
147	September 19, 2005	Cybill Shepherd, Phil Keoghan	Institute
148	September 20, 2005	Tyra Banks, Tyler James Williams	Ted Alexandro
149	September 21, 2005	Nick Cannon, Jeff Probst, Lawrence Turman	N/A
150	September 22, 2005	Aisha Tyler, Seth MacFarlane	Thirty Seconds to Mars
151	September 23, 2005	Susan Sarandon, Tom Everett Scott	INXS
152	September 26, 2005	Danny Bonaduce, Diane Farr	Shaggy
153	September 27, 2005	Maria Bello, Jason Segel	N/A
154	September 28, 2005	Alan Alda, Jennifer Coolidge	N/A
155	September 29, 2005	Fran Drescher, Robert David Hall	Jo Dee Messina
156	September 30, 2005	Toni Collette, Dave Price	Robert Plant & Strange Sensation

=== October ===
No.	Original release date	Guest(s)	Musical/entertainment guest(s)
157	October 3, 2005	Julian McMahon, Jennifer Finnigan	North Mississippi Allstars
158	October 4, 2005	Taryn Manning, Dr. Drew	Butch Bradley
159	October 5, 2005	David Duchovny	Sinéad O'Connor
160	October 6, 2005	Henry Winkler, Aron Ralston	Julie Gribble
161	October 7, 2005	Illeana Douglas	Macy Gray
162	October 10, 2005	Macy Gray, Nuala O'Faolain	Rihanna
163	October 11, 2005	Dennis Hopper, Cheryl Hines	Sarge
164	October 12, 2005	Joe Mantegna, Sue Johanson	N/A
165	October 13, 2005	Sanjay Gupta, Stephen Collins	N/A
166	October 14, 2005	Bill Nye, Kevin Bacon & Michael Bacon	Bacon Brothers
167	October 17, 2005	Joely Fisher, McG	Switchfoot
168	October 18, 2005	Melina Kanakaredes, Stephen Robinson	N/A
169	October 19, 2005	Betty White, Rhona Mitra	Ray J
170	October 20, 2005	Stockard Channing, Michael Connelly	Jamie Cullum
171	October 21, 2005	Jason Schwartzman, Mitch Braswell	Paul Weller
172	October 31, 2005	Sharon Osbourne	N/A

=== November ===
No.	Original release date	Guest(s)	Musical/entertainment guest(s)
173	November 1, 2005	Maria Bartiromo, Jamie Kaler	Clint Black
174	November 2, 2005	Anthony LaPaglia, Jeri Ryan	N/A
175	November 3, 2005	Charlie Sheen, Marissa Jaret Winokur	Franz Ferdinand
176	November 4, 2005	Gina Gershon, Rob Zombie	Sinéad O'Connor
177	November 7, 2005	Hugh Laurie, Twiggy	Patty Loveless
178	November 8, 2005	Brenda Blethyn, Jim Sheridan	John Roy
179	November 9, 2005	John Leguizamo, Kara Cooney	My Morning Jacket
180	November 10, 2005	John Malkovich	N/A
181	November 11, 2005	Xzibit, Doug Savant	Buddy Guy
182	November 14, 2005	James Belushi, Parminder Nagra	Matisyahu
183	November 15, 2005	Patti Smith, John Lahr	N/A
184	November 16, 2005	Anne Heche, Tom Amandes	Jay Larson
185	November 17, 2005	RZA, Josh Schwartz	Amos Lee
186	November 18, 2005	Jon Favreau, Randy Cohen	Maz Jobrani
187	November 21, 2005	Juliette Lewis, Brian Van Holt	Juliette and the Licks
188	November 22, 2005	Jerry O'Connell, Joely Richardson	The Fray
189	November 23, 2005	Regis Philbin, Maureen Dowd	N/A
190	November 24, 2005	Jennifer Love Hewitt, James Denton	Robert Plant
191	November 25, 2005	Danny Bonaduce, Paul Haggis	N/A
192	November 28, 2005	Ted Danson, Kristen Bell	Matt Fulchiron
193	November 29, 2005	Sela Ward, Lawrence O'Donnell	Chris Botti, Paul Buchanan
194	November 30, 2005	Tony Shalhoub, Mitch Albom	N/A

=== December ===
No.	Original release date	Guest(s)	Musical/entertainment guest(s)
195	December 1, 2005	Miranda Lambert, Malachy McCourt	Miranda Lambert
196	December 2, 2005	Tom Arnold, Helen Fielding	Lifehouse
197	December 12, 2005	Jon Cryer, Amy Yasbeck	N/A
198	December 13, 2005	John Waters, David Steinberg	Nada Surf
199	December 14, 2005	Poppy Montgomery, Mancow (Band)	N/A
200	December 15, 2005	Michelle Yeoh, Jeremy Roenick	Trey Anastasio
201	December 16, 2005	Chris Isaak, Sara Gilbert	Keaton Simons
202	December 19, 2005	Dennis Quaid, Bill Nye	Bob Marley
203	December 20, 2005	Dwight Yoakam, Teri Garr	N/A
204	December 21, 2005	Little Richard, Brian Cox	N/A
205	December 22, 2005	Téa Leoni, Amy Tan	RZA
206	December 23, 2005	Katey Sagal, Colin Hanks	Brian McKnight
