= List of The Late Late Show with Craig Ferguson episodes (2009) =

- No. of episodes: 209

Release
- Original network: CBS

Season chronology
- ← Previous; 2008 episodes Next → 2010 episodes

This is the list of episodes for The Late Late Show with Craig Ferguson in 2009.

== 2009 ==
=== January ===
No.	Original release date	Guest(s)	Musical/entertainment guest(s)
798	January 5, 2009	Richard Lewis, Tracie Thoms	N/A
799	January 6, 2009	Marisa Tomei, Pauley Perrette	N/A
800	January 7, 2009	William Shatner, Jazmine Sullivan	N/A
801	January 8, 2009	Amy Sedaris, Dennis Haysbert	N/A
802	January 9, 2009	Ted Danson, Paula Poundstone	N/A
803	January 12, 2009	John Corbett, Tracie Thoms	N/A
804	January 13, 2009	Kristin Scott Thomas, Josh Jackson	N/A
805	January 14, 2009	John Waters, Norah O'Donnell	N/A
806	January 15, 2009	Wanda Sykes	Glasvegas
807	January 16, 2009	Dev Patel	Greg Proops
808	January 19, 2009	Sarah Chalke, Jeffrey Dean Morgan	Seal
809	January 20, 2009	Joel McHale The Submarines	N/A
810	January 21, 2009	Trace Adkins, Perez Hilton	N/A
811	January 22, 2009	Jennifer Love Hewitt, Matthew Rhys	N/A
812	January 23, 2009	James Earl Jones, Rosemarie DeWitt	N/A
813	January 26, 2009	Chris Matthews	Paul Morrissey
814	January 27, 2009	RZA, Jared Harris	N/A
815	January 28, 2009	Cuba Gooding Jr., Freida Pinto	N/A
816	January 29, 2009	Dominic Monaghan, Rosemarie DeWitt	N/A
817	January 30, 2009	Michael Sheen, Russell Peters	Sharon Jones & the Dap-Kings

=== February ===
No.	Original release date	Guest(s)	Musical/entertainment guest(s)
818	February 2, 2009	Alfred Molina, Lance Burton	N/A
819	February 3, 2009	Robin Williams	N/A
820	February 4, 2009	Samuel L. Jackson	Jason Hudy
821	February 5, 2009	Garry Shandling, Ed Alonzo	N/A
822	February 6, 2009	Kristen Bell	Franz Ferdinand
823	February 9, 2009	Michael Clarke Duncan, Richard Zoglin	Adele
824	February 10, 2009	Sean Combs, Olivia Williams	N/A
825	February 11, 2009	Steve Coogan, Connie Britton	N/A
826	February 12, 2009	Lewis Black, Shirley Manson	N/A
827	February 13, 2009	Tom Selleck	Glen Campbell
828	February 16, 2009	David Boreanaz, Philip Johnson	Zac Brown Band
829	February 17, 2009	Bill Maher, Chris Klein	N/A
830	February 18, 2009	Wynonna, Peter Bart	N/A
831	February 19, 2009	Paula Abdul, Carl Edwards	N/A
832	February 20, 2009	Rosie O'Donnell	The Knux

=== March ===
No.	Original release date	Guest(s)	Musical/entertainment guest(s)
833	March 2, 2009	Paris Hilton, Dee Dee Myers	N/A
834	March 3, 2009	Kristin Davis, Wolfgang Puck	N/A
835	March 4, 2009	Desmond Tutu	N/A
836	March 5, 2009	Holly Hunter	Andrew Bird
837	March 6, 2009	Amy Adams	M Ward, Nick Griffin
838	March 9, 2009	Jason Segel, Dave Attell	N/A
839	March 10, 2009	Rosario, Gordon Ramsay	N/A
840	March 11, 2009	Tim Daly, Kara Cooney	N/A
841	March 12, 2009	Jim Parsons	Sara Bareilles
842	March 13, 2009	Christina Ricci	Mike Birbiglia
843	March 16, 2009	Regis Philbin	The Upper Crust
844	March 17, 2009	Julia Louis-Dreyfus	Dropkick Murphys
845	March 18, 2009	Steven Wright, Rashida Jones	N/A
846	March 23, 2009	Paul Rudd	George Wallace
847	March 24, 2009	Virginia Madsen, Jason Ritter	Chicago
848	March 25, 2009	Jerry O'Connell, Tucker Albrizzi, Patrick Pedraja	Ra Ra Riot
849	March 30, 2009	William Shatner, Regina King	N/A
850	March 31, 2009	Isabella Rossellini, Linda Cardellini	N/A

=== April ===
No.	Original release date	Guest(s)	Musical/entertainment guest(s)
851	April 1, 2009	Jennifer Tilly, Heidi Newfield	N/A
852	April 2, 2009	Brittany Murphy, Christopher Gorham	N/A
853	April 3, 2009	Zooey Deschanel	Lance Krall
854	April 13, 2009	Dwight Yoakam, Mary McCormack	N/A
855	April 14, 2009	Adam Goldberg, Anna Gunn	Brett Dennen
856	April 15, 2009	Michael Caine	Matt Beatz
857	April 16, 2009	Madeleine Albright, Amy Smart	N/A
858	April 17, 2009	Jessica Lange, Tom Lennon	Madeleine Peyroux
859	April 20, 2009	Simon Cowell, Jean Smart	Erin McCarley
860	April 21, 2009	Rob Morrow, Jean-Michel Cousteau	N/A
861	April 22, 2009	Bob Barker, Jean Smart	N/A
862	April 23, 2009	Teri Hatcher, Martina McBride	N/A
863	April 24, 2009	Eddie Izzard, Chris Botti	N/A
864	April 27, 2009	Shirley Manson, Breckin Meyer	N/A
865	April 28, 2009	John McEnroe, Stana Katic	N/A
866	April 29, 2009	Kenneth Branagh	Antony and the Johnsons
867	April 30, 2009	Michael Douglas, Carrie Ann Inaba	N/A

=== May ===
No.	Original release date	Guest(s)	Musical/entertainment guest(s)
868	May 1, 2009	Ryan Reynolds, Ricky Hatton	N/A
869	May 4, 2009	Jeffrey Dean Morgan, Stana Katic	N/A
870	May 5, 2009	George Hamilton, Jenny Lewis	N/A
871	May 6, 2009	Melina Kanakaredes, Nathan Fillion	Zac Brown Band
872	May 7, 2009	Matthew McConaughey, Cokie Roberts	N/A
873	May 8, 2009	Amy Smart, Kunal Nayyar	N/A
874	May 11, 2009	Steven Wright, Bryce Dallas Howard	N/A
875	May 12, 2009	Paulina Porizkova, Andy Nulman	N/A
876	May 13, 2009	Laurence Fishburne, Paula Poundstone	N/A
877	May 14, 2009	Howie Mandel, Laura Lippman	N/A
878	May 15, 2009	Ewan McGregor	All American Rejects
879	May 18, 2009	Justin Long, Lawrence Block	N/A
880	May 19, 2009	Kathy Griffin, Nelson George	N/A
881	May 20, 2009	Guy Pearce, Hattie Hayridge	N/A
882	May 21, 2009	John Waters	Manda Mosher
883	May 22, 2009	Mark Ruffalo, Mindy Kaling	The Decemberists
884	May 25, 2009	Bob Saget, P. W. Singer	N/A
885	May 26, 2009	Chris Isaac, Moon Bloodgood	N/A

=== June ===
No.	Original release date	Guest(s)	Musical/entertainment guest(s)
886	June 1, 2009	Mary-Louise Parker, Guillermo del Toro	Tori Amos
887	June 2, 2009	Denis Leary	Diane Birch
888	June 3, 2009	Jeffrey Tambor, Gabrielle Anwar	N/A
889	June 4, 2009	Elizabeth Perkins, Mark Burnett	Bernie Williams
890	June 5, 2009	Chris Kattan	Henry Cho
891	June 8, 2009	Kevin Bacon, Michael Irvin	N/A
892	June 9, 2009	Dame Edna Everage	N/A
893	June 10, 2009	Chris Matthews, Theresa Andersson	N/A
894	June 11, 2009	Larry King, Anna Friel	N/A
895	June 12, 2009	Dane Cook, Peter Travers	N/A
896	June 15, 2009	Holly Hunter	Camera Obscura
897	June 16, 2009	Jeff Foxworthy	Gavin DeGraw
898	June 17, 2009	Julia Ormond, Derrick Pitts	N/A
899	June 18, 2009	Sandra Bullock	Metric, David Feldman
900	June 19, 2009	Bryan Cranston, Ben Kweller	N/A
901	June 22, 2009	Marion Cotillard, Michael Musto	N/A
902	June 23, 2009	Jim Parsons, James Frey	N/A
903	June 24, 2009	Mary Steenburgen, Bettye LaVette	Todd Sawyer
904	June 25, 2009	Larry David, Wolfgang Puck	N/A
905	June 26, 2009	Lisa Kudrow	N/A

=== July ===
No.	Original release date	Guest(s)	Musical/entertainment guest(s)
906	July 6, 2009	Eric Idle, Dr. Lisa Masterson	N/A
907	July 7, 2009	Evan Rachel Wood, Christopher Gorham	N/A
908	July 8, 2009	Julie Chen, Michael Ian Black	Will Dailey
909	July 9, 2009	Jeff Goldblum, Jackie Collins	N/A
910	July 10, 2009	Ray Romano	Michael Bublé
911	July 13, 2009	Selma Blair, Connie Schultz	N/A
912	July 14, 2009	John Larroquette, Will Dailey	Charlie Viracola
913	July 15, 2009	Rosie Perez, Mike Massimino	N/A
914	July 16, 2009	Isaac Mizrahi, Shohreh Aghdashloo	N/A
915	July 17, 2009	Paris Hilton, Alan Furst	Ray LaMontagne
916	July 20, 2009	Margaret Cho, Michael Lewis	Eric Church
917	July 21, 2009	Gerard Butler, Jackie Collins	N/A
918	July 22, 2009	Tom Lennon, Kelly Rowland	Dobie Maxwell
919	July 23, 2009	Cheryl Hines, Ben Mezrich	N/A
920	July 24, 2009	Rashida Jones, José Andrés	Jim Breuer
921	July 27, 2009	Chelsea Handler, Richard Wolffe	N/A
922	July 28, 2009	Christiane Amanpour, Johnny Galecki	N/A
923	July 29, 2009	Toni Collette, Rodney Carrington	N/A
924	July 30, 2009	James Spader, Rose Byrne	N/A
925	July 31, 2009	Saffron Burrows	N/A

=== August ===
No.	Original release date	Guest(s)	Musical/entertainment guest(s)
926	August 3, 2009	Edie Falco, Les Stroud	Lisa Landry
927	August 4, 2009	Tony Shalhoub, Minka Kelly	N/A
928	August 5, 2009	Wolf Blitzer, Rose Byrne	N/A
929	August 6, 2009	Zooey Deschanel	Glasvegas
930	August 7, 2009	Don Rickles	Sharon Jones & The Dap-Kings
931	August 10, 2009	Carrot Top, Alexis Bledel	N/A
932	August 11, 2009	Betty White, Mitch Albom	Bonnie Raitt & Taj Mahal
933	August 12, 2009	Eric Bana, Holly Williams	N/A
934	August 13, 2009	Jon Cryer	N/A
935	August 14, 2009	Liza Minnelli, Kara Cooney	N/A
936	August 31, 2009	Emily Deschanel, Terry Crews	N/A

=== September ===
No.	Original release date	Guest(s)	Musical/entertainment guest(s)
937	September 1, 2009	Quentin Tarantino	N/A
938	September 2, 2009	Mila Kunis	N/A
939	September 3, 2009	Carrie Fisher, DJ Qualls	N/A
940	September 4, 2009	Radha Mitchell, Jason Ritter	N/A
941	September 7, 2009	Juliette Lewis, Alex O'Loughlin	N/A
942	September 8, 2009	Neil Patrick Harris	Spencer Day
943	September 9, 2009	Danny DeVito	N/A
944	September 10, 2009	Audrey Tautou, Ron Livingston	N/A
945	September 11, 2009	Drew Carey, Mindy Kaling	N/A
946	September 21, 2009	Marg Helgenberger, Dulé Hill	Black Joe Lewis & the Honeybears
947	September 22, 2009	Reba McEntire	Dave Annable
948	September 23, 2009	Jennifer Love Hewitt, Ken Tucker	Arctic Monkeys
949	September 24, 2009	Jason Schwartzman, Angela Kinsey	N/A
950	September 25, 2009	Ted Danson, Christopher Miller, Phil Lord	N/A
951	September 28, 2009	Chris O'Donnell, Paula Poundstone	N/A
952	September 29, 2009	James Spader, Cathy Ladman	Laura Izibor
953	September 30, 2009	Jenna Elfman	Dom Irrera

=== October ===
No.	Original release date	Guest(s)	Musical/entertainment guest(s)
954	October 1, 2009	Patricia Arquette, Dominic Cooper	N/A
955	October 2, 2009	Tim Gunn, Cobie Smulders	Lynyrd Skynyrd
956	October 5, 2009	Michael Sheen, Viola Davis	Jack Ingram
957	October 6, 2009	Julia Louis-Dreyfus	The Avett Brothers
958	October 7, 2009	Rachel Bilson, David Milch	N/A
959	October 8, 2009	Jean Reno, Sophia Bush	N/A
960	October 9, 2009	Gerard Butler	Phoenix
961	October 12, 2009	David Boreanaz, Mitch Albom	Dierks Bentley
962	October 13, 2009	Tim Robbins, Adam Goldberg	N/A
963	October 14, 2009	Kristen Bell, Robert Carlyle	N/A
964	October 15, 2009	Forest Whitaker, Adam Savage, Jamie Hyneman	A Fine Frenzy
965	October 16, 2009	Michelle Monaghan, Toby Keith	Toby Keith
966	October 26, 2009	Sherri Shepherd, Alex Dryden	N/A
967	October 27, 2009	Alicia Silverstone, Salman Rushdie	N/A
968	October 28, 2009	Madeleine Albright	Rodrigo y Gabriela
969	October 29, 2009	Newt Gingrich	N/A
970	October 30, 2009	Lauren Graham, Jessalyn Gilsig	Fruit Bats

=== November ===
No.	Original release date	Guest(s)	Musical/entertainment guest(s)
971	November 2, 2009	Billy Connolly, George Eads	Jack Ingram
972	November 3, 2009	Valerie Bertinelli, Dave Barry	N/A
973	November 4, 2009	Mo'Nique, Stephen Fry	N/A
974	November 5, 2009	Denis Leary, Jena Malone	N/A
975	November 6, 2009	Ewan McGregor, Anthony Zuiker	Regina Spektor
976	November 9, 2009	Carla Gugino, Dennis Lehane	N/A
977	November 10, 2009	Adam Arkin, Nina García	N/A
978	November 11, 2009	Kenneth Branagh	N/A
979	November 12, 2009	Trace Adkins	Nick Griffin
980	November 13, 2009	Harry Connick Jr., Peter Segal	N/A
981	November 16, 2009	LL Cool J, Mindy Kaling	N/A
982	November 17, 2009	Woody Harrelson, Joe Theismann	N/A
983	November 18, 2009	David Duchovny, Lewis Black	N/A
984	November 19, 2009	Sandra Bullock, Ben Foster	N/A
985	November 20, 2009	Neil Patrick Harris	David Grey
986	November 23, 2009	Margaret Cho, Carl Edwards	N/A
987	November 24, 2009	Maria Bello, Peter Capaldi	Relentless7
988	November 25, 2009	Robin Wright, Wolfgang Puck	N/A
989	November 30, 2009	Michael Sheen, Carl Bernstein	N/A

=== December ===
No.	Original release date	Guest(s)	Musical/entertainment guest(s)
990	December 1, 2009	Joel McHale	The Swell Season
991	December 2, 2009	Paul Shaffer, Shohreh Aghdashloo	N/A
992	December 3, 2009	George Lopez	OneRepublic
993	December 4, 2009	Emily Blunt, David Bianculli	N/A
994	December 7, 2009	Shirley Manson, Mitch Albom	N/A
995	December 8, 2009	Michael Clarke Duncan, Gillian Jacobs	N/A
996	December 9, 2009	Morgan Freeman	Overtone
997	December 10, 2009	Howie Mandel, Paula Marshall	N/A
998	December 11, 2009	Jim Parsons	They Might Be Giants
999	December 14, 2009	Joshua Jackson, Lake Bell	N/A
1,000	December 15, 2009	Jason Schwartzman, Maria Bello, Kristen Bell	Jason Segel performs his Dracula puppet (accompanied by The Broken West)
1,001	December 16, 2009	Bob Barker, Greta Van Susteren	N/A
1,002	December 17, 2009	Sigourney Weaver, Hank Stuever	N/A
1,003	December 18, 2009	Judi Dench, Michelle Rodriguez	N/A
1,004	December 21, 2009	Renée Fleming	Jim McDonald
1,005	December 22, 2009	Kathy Griffin, Harry Connick Jr.	N/A
1,006	December 23, 2009	Paris Hilton, José Andrés	N/A
