= List of The Late Late Show with Craig Ferguson episodes (2006) =

Release
- Original network: CBS

Season chronology
- ← Previous; 2005 episodes Next → 2007 episodes

This is the list of episodes for The Late Late Show with Craig Ferguson in 2006.

== 2006 ==
=== January ===
No.	Original release date	Guest(s)	Musical/entertainment guest(s)
207	January 2, 2006	Drew Pinsky, Bob Spitz	N/A
208	January 3, 2006	Fred Willard, Connie Schultz	N/A
209	January 4, 2006	Rob Morrow	Bob Marley
210	January 5, 2006	Don Rickles, Ivana Miličević	Aimee Mann
211	January 6, 2006	Daryl Hannah, Thomas Lennon	N/A
212	January 9, 2006	Cheryl Hines, Derek Luke	Trey Anastasio
213	January 10, 2006	Phil McGraw	Sebastian Maniscalco
214	January 11, 2006	Seth Green, Peter Bart, Peter Guber	N/A
215	January 12, 2006	Tom Selleck, Connie Britton	Ian Edwards
216	January 13, 2006	Steven Wright, Lola Glaudini	Anthony Hamilton
217	January 16, 2006	Allison Janney, John C. McGinley	The 88
218	January 17, 2006	Greg Kinnear, Paula Poundstone	Ming Tsai
219	January 18, 2006	Thomas Cavanagh	N/A
220	January 19, 2006	Vanessa Williams	Rogue Wave
221	January 20, 2006	Mimi Rogers	Living Things
222	January 30, 2006	Drew Pinsky, Amy Yasbeck	Wicked Tinkers
223	January 31, 2006	Jim Belushi, Parminder Nagra	Matisyahu

=== February ===
No.	Original release date	Guest(s)	Musical/entertainment guest(s)
224	February 1, 2006	James Woods, Piper Perabo	Keaton Simons
225	February 2, 2006	Emma Thompson, Steve Byrne	N/A
226	February 3, 2006	Lynn Redgrave, Isaiah Washington	Mutemath
227	February 6, 2006	Mary Steenburgen	Big & Rich
228	February 7, 2006	Jeff Probst, Lauren Holly	Ne-Yo
229	February 8, 2006	Zooey Deschanel	Trace Adkins
230	February 9, 2006	Jean Reno, Sanaa Lathan	N/A
231	February 10, 2006	Eddie Izzard, Patti Hall	N/A
232	February 13, 2006	Alyson Hannigan, Paul Haggis	Frank Caliendo
233	February 14, 2006	Marlee Matlin	Lisa Loeb
234	February 15, 2006	Paul Reiser, Judy Greer	Jeff Cesario
235	February 16, 2006	Kiefer Sutherland, Amy Adams	Rocco DeLuca and the Burden
236	February 17, 2006	Jason Biggs	Fiona Apple
237	February 20, 2006	William Shatner, Josh Bernstein	Andrea Bocelli
238	February 21, 2006	Carl Reiner, Nadine Velazquez	Robert Hawkins
239	February 22, 2006	Carl Edwards, William H. Macy	N/A
240	February 23, 2006	Samuel L. Jackson, Cokie Roberts	The Lashes
241	February 24, 2006	Dolly Parton, Kevin Smith	The Cult
242	February 27, 2006	Terrence Howard, Eric Haney	N/A
243	February 28, 2006	Regis Philbin, Tichina Arnold	Jenny Lewis & the Watson Twins

=== March ===
No.	Original release date	Guest(s)	Musical/entertainment guest(s)
244	March 1, 2006	Roseanne Barr, Wolfgang Puck	N/A
245	March 2, 2006	Kathy Bates, Idina Menzel, Jeremy Bloom	N/A
246	March 3, 2006	Milla Jovovich, Peter Travers	All American Rejects
247	March 6, 2006	Paul Haggis, Ben Lee, James Blake	N/A
248	March 7, 2006	Tyra Banks, Jackie Collins, Nathan Sawaya	N/A
249	March 8, 2006	John Larroquette, Ethan Suplee	Fiona Apple
250	March 9, 2006	Wynonna, Emilie de Ravin	D. C. Benny
251	March 10, 2006	David Arquette	Cowboy Troy
252	March 20, 2006	Stockard Channing	Big & Rich
253	March 21, 2006	Rosanne Cash, Howie Mandel	N/A
254	March 22, 2006	Jason Lee, Julian Sands	David Gray
255	March 27, 2006	Joan Cusack, Mary McCormack	The New Cars
256	March 28, 2006	Jane Kaczmarek, Tom Fontana	Dan Naturman
257	March 29, 2006	John Goodman, Angela Nissel	Alkaline Trio
258	March 30, 2006	Frankie Muniz, Annie Duke	N/A
259	March 31, 2006	Chris Kattan, Mo'Nique	Ozomatli

=== April ===
No.	Original release date	Guest(s)	Musical/entertainment guest(s)
260	April 3, 2006	Mehcad Brooks, Anjelica Huston	Ne-Yo
261	April 4, 2006	Rosie O'Donnell, Harry Shearer	N/A
262	April 5, 2006	Paget Brewster, Sam Elliott	Adam Ferrara
263	April 6, 2006	Ben Kingsley, Roselyn Sánchez	UB40
264	April 7, 2006	Kevin Pollak, Mira Sorvino	Train
265	April 10, 2006	Christian Finnegan, Chi McBride, Bebe Neuwirth	N/A
266	April 11, 2006	Carrie Fisher	John Corbett
267	April 12, 2006	Carl Hiaasen, Toby Keith	N/A
268	April 13, 2006	Roger Lay Jr., Ray Romano, Ken Shamrock	N/A
269	April 14, 2006	Melina Kanakaredes, Kyle MacLachlan	Shinedown
270	April 24, 2006	Dennis Quaid	The Wiggles
271	April 25, 2006	Radha Mitchell, Marion Ross	Erin Boheme
272	April 26, 2006	Jennifer Finnigan, Barry Sonnenfeld	N/A
273	April 27, 2006	Dave Barry	Dem Franchize Boyz
274	April 28, 2006	Kristin Chenoweth, Andy García, Mandy Moore	Rock Bottom Remainders

=== May ===
No.	Original release date	Guest(s)	Musical/entertainment guest(s)
275	May 1, 2006	Neil Patrick Harris, Parminder Nagra	The BellRays
276	May 2, 2006	Randy Jackson, Connie Schultz	N/A
277	May 3, 2006	Reggie Bush, Jennifer Love Hewitt, Frank McCourt	Secret Machines
278	May 4, 2006	Emily Deschanel, Kelsey Grammer, Aisha Tyler	The Go! Team
279	May 5, 2006	Julia Louis-Dreyfus	Ying-Yang Twins
280	May 8, 2006	Denis Leary	Bo Bice
281	May 9, 2006	Donald Faison, Betty White	Bill Bailey
282	May 10, 2006	Bill Carter, Jenna Fischer	Chris Isaak
283	May 11, 2006	Paul Bettany, Kate Walsh	Damian Marley
284	May 12, 2006	Jacinda Barrett, Mark Harmon	Rock Kills Kid
285	May 15, 2006	Daryl Hannah	Sara Ramirez
286	May 16, 2006	Phil McGraw	Jim Gaffigan
287	May 17, 2006	Merv Griffin, Rick Reilly	N/A
288	May 18, 2006	Diane Farr, Dominic Monaghan	Phil Vassar
289	May 19, 2006	Mía Maestro	Nick Lachey
290	May 22, 2006	Reba McEntire, Cynthia Watros	Toby Keith
291	May 23, 2006	Anna Paquin, Casper Van Dien	Jason Aldean
292	May 24, 2006	Ricki Lake, Oscar De La Hoya	The Wreckers
293	May 25, 2006	Pauley Perrette	Brooks and Dunn
294	May 26, 2006	Jenny McCarthy, Jim Short	Gomez

=== June ===
No.	Original release date	Guest(s)	Musical/entertainment guest(s)
295	June 5, 2006	Jon Favreau, Shooter Jennings, Lee Child	N/A
296	June 6, 2006	Patricia Heaton, Claire Fordham	The New Cars
297	June 7, 2006	Ian McShane, Joey Lauren Adams, Stanley Bing	N/A
298	June 8, 2006	Edie Falco, David Lee Roth	N/A
299	June 9, 2006	Tom Everett Scott	Ludacris, Speech
300	June 12, 2006	Sara Rue, Anthony Michael Hall	Secret Machines
301	June 13, 2006	Anderson Cooper, Mercedes Ruehl	Dan Cummins
302	June 14, 2006	Lorraine Bracco, Kevin Connolly, Jamie Jenson	N/A
303	June 15, 2006	Tony Shalhoub, Lucy Davis	Echo & the Bunnymen
304	June 16, 2006	Jon Cryer, Jim Short	Three Days Grace
305	June 19, 2006	Pepe the King Prawn, Sarah Wynter	The Charlatans
306	June 20, 2006	Katey Sagal, David Milch, Arturo Gatti	N/A
307	June 21, 2006	Stanley Tucci, Cat Deeley	Van Hunt
308	June 22, 2006	Jack Black, James Marsden	Sonya Kitchell
309	June 23, 2006	Tyrese Gibson, Def Leppard, Paul Morrissey	N/A
310	June 26, 2006	Regis Philbin, John Landis	Snoop Dogg
311	June 27, 2006	Henry Winkler, Judy Greer, Mike Young	N/A
312	June 28, 2006	Dave Foley, Amy Sedaris	UB40
313	June 29, 2006	Tim Robbins	T.I.
314	June 30, 2006	Jesse James, Paul Dinello	She Wants Revenge

=== July ===
No.	Original release date	Guest(s)	Musical/entertainment guest(s)
315	July 5, 2006	Laurence Fishburne, Illeana Douglas,	Jack's Mannequin
316	July 6, 2006	Tom Lennon	Jewel
317	July 7, 2006	Donal Logue	Ne-Yo
318	July 10, 2006	Toni Collette, Lawrence Block, Joe Theismann	N/A
319	July 11, 2006	Julie Chen, Denise Mina	Echo & the Bunnymen
320	July 12, 2006	Danny Bonaduce, Cote De Pablo, Bill McArthur	N/A
321	July 13, 2006	Joe Mantegna	Brooks & Dunn
322	July 14, 2006	Nick Cannon, Kyle Dunnigan	Family Force 5
323	July 24, 2006	Eddie Izzard, Greg Warren	The Buzzcocks
324	July 25, 2006	Kevin Smith, Carrie Ann Inaba	Seether
325	July 26, 2006	Cuba Gooding Jr., Jay Larson,	Jurassic 5
326	July 27, 2006	Greg Kinnear, Hugh Hefner, Sammy Hagar	N/A
327	July 28, 2006	Kyra Sedgwick, Keith Olbermann	N/A
328	July 31, 2006	Andie MacDowell	Cirque du Soleil's KA

=== August ===
No.	Original release date	Guest(s)	Musical/entertainment guest(s)
329	August 1, 2006	Bonnie Raitt, Travis Pastrana	Randy Kagan
330	August 2, 2006	Drew Pinsky, Carnie Wilson	Tally Hall
331	August 3, 2006	Jaime Pressly, Robbie Coltrane	Michael Franti & Spearhead
332	August 4, 2006	Carlos Mencia	Natasha Bedingfield
333	August 7, 2006	Steve Carell	The Subways
334	August 8, 2006	Aaron Eckhart, Cheyenne Kimball, Fran Solomita	N/A
335	August 9, 2006	Tim Olyphant, Lindsay Sloane	The Editors
336	August 10, 2006	Christina Milian, Tim Olyphant, Brian Malow	N/A
337	August 11, 2006	Michael Clarke Duncan, Laura Kightlinger	Rob Zombie
338	August 14, 2006	Chi McBride, Lili Taylor	Nick Lachey
339	August 15, 2006	Matt Dillon, Padma Lakshmi	Paula DeAnda, Baby Bash
340	August 16, 2006	Alice Cooper, Penelope Ann Miller	N/A
341	August 17, 2006	Jane Kaczmarek, Esai Morales, Larke Miller	N/A
342	August 21, 2006	Shannen Doherty, Eddie Kaye Thomas	E-40 T-Pain
343	August 22, 2006	Fred Willard, Rachel Blanchard, Stephen J. Cannell	N/A
344	August 23, 2006	Amy Smart, Trace Adkins	N/A
345	August 24, 2006	Denis Leary, Lewis Dix	Matt Goss
346	August 25, 2006	André Benjamin, David Boreanaz	Mellowdrone

=== September ===
No.	Original release date	Guest(s)	Musical/entertainment guest(s)
347	September 11, 2006	Aaron Brown, Ralph Geidel	Paolo Nutini
348	September 12, 2006	Michael Rapaport, Joely Fisher	N/A
349	September 13, 2006	Virginia Madsen, Jason Ritter	Matt Baetz
350	September 14, 2006	Gary Sinise, Whitley Strieber	Chris Isaak
351	September 15, 2006	Mia Kirshner	Method Man
352	September 18, 2006	Edward Norton, Ethan Suplee	LeToya
353	September 19, 2006	Skeet Ulrich, Nora Ephron	Rodney Atkins
354	September 20, 2006	James Woods, George Eads	Heartland
355	September 21, 2006	Chazz Palminteri, Kerry Washington	French Kiss
356	September 22, 2006	Bradley Whitford, Trudie Styler, Larry Johnson	Sam Roberts
357	September 25, 2006	Lauren Graham, Nick Griffin	Joan Jett
358	September 26, 2006	Marie Osmond, Jacinda Barrett, Mitch Albom	N/A
359	September 27, 2006	Forest Whitaker, Julie Walters, Shang Forbes	N/A
360	September 28, 2006	Billy Connolly, Michael Ian Black	M. Ward
361	September 29, 2006	Billy Bob Thornton, Duane Martin	Starsailor

=== October ===
No.	Original release date	Guest(s)	Musical/entertainment guest(s)
362	October 2, 2006	Jon Favreau, Kristen Bell	Amos Lee
363	October 3, 2006	Tim Daly, David Cross	Diana Krall
364	October 4, 2006	Busta Rhymes, Connie Britton	N/A
365	October 5, 2006	Brooke Shields, Michael Ian Black	Billy Bragg
366	October 6, 2006	Howie Mandel, Andy Summers	Rodrigo y Gabriela
367	October 9, 2006	Emmitt Smith, Kristin Chenoweth	N/A
368	October 10, 2006	Laura Linney, Jordanna Brester	Say Anything
369	October 11, 2006	David Arquette	Monica
370	October 12, 2006	Jennifer Beals, Michael Sheen	Chingy
371	October 13, 2006	Michael Caine	Mario Vasquez
372	October 23, 2006	Maria Bello, Derek Luke	Robin Thicke
373	October 24, 2006	Alan Arkin, Paul Haggis	Jimmy Pardo
374	October 25, 2006	Ron Rifkin, Kevin Nealon	Corinne Bailey Rae
375	October 26, 2006	Brooke Hogan, Eva La Rue, Jason Schwartzman	N/A
376	October 27, 2006	Danny Bonaduce, Gene Pompa	Mew
377	October 30, 2006	Kim Raver, Bob Saget	Deana Carter & Heart
378	October 31, 2006	Carrie Fisher, Todd Oliver	Alice Cooper

=== November ===
No.	Original release date	Guest(s)	Musical/entertainment guest(s)
379	November 1, 2006	Barry Pepper, Amy Sedaris	Carlos Alazraqui
380	November 2, 2006	Tim Robbins, Jamie Lidell	N/A
381	November 3, 2006	Alec Baldwin, Barry Manilow	N/A
382	November 6, 2006	Val Kilmer, Rebecca Gayheart	Paolo Nutini
383	November 8, 2006	Merv Griffin, Marshall Faulk	Carrot Top
384	November 9, 2006	Emma Thompson, Eamonn Walker	Joseph Arthur
385	November 10, 2006	Ashley Judd, Seth MacFarlane	Pet Shop Boys
386	November 13, 2006	Hugh Laurie, Spike Feresten	OK Go
387	November 14, 2006	Steven Weber, Emily Deschanel, Phil Rosenthal	N/A
388	November 15, 2006	Anne Heche, Rain Pryor	Jeff Caldwell
389	November 16, 2006	Maura Tierney, Scott Turow	Lindsay Buckingham
390	November 17, 2006	Ice-T, Henry Cho	N/A
391	November 20, 2006	Christian Slater, Sue Johanson	Driveblind
392	November 21, 2006	Emilio Estevez, Eva Pigford	Jim Short
393	November 22, 2006	Fred Willard, Ashley Scott	Gabriel Iglesias
394	November 23, 2006	Felicity Huffman, Dax Shepard	Akon
395	November 27, 2006	William Shatner, Mike Luckovich	Driveblind
396	November 28, 2006	William H. Macy, Jeri Ryan, Isabel Allende	N/A
397	November 29, 2006	Anthony LaPaglia, Carl Edwards	Sparta
398	November 30, 2006	John Waters, Alex Borstein	Plain White T's

=== December ===
No.	Original release date	Guest(s)	Musical/entertainment guest(s)
399	December 1, 2006	Kevin Smith, Suzy Nakamura	Joseph Arthur
400	December 4, 2006	Betty White, Twiggy	Sam Moore & Travis Tritt
401	December 6, 2006	John Stamos, Sean Maguire	Ziggy Marley
402	December 7, 2006	Chris Kattan, Chiwetel Ejiofor	Ciara
403	December 8, 2006	John Novasad	Tyrese
404	December 11, 2006	Ted Danson, Julia Sweeney	Akon
405	December 12, 2006	Camryn Manheim, Stephen Fry	N/A
406	December 13, 2006	Rob Morrow, Lucy Lawless	Jet
407	December 14, 2006	Pat Croce	Jewel
408	December 15, 2006	Michael Rapaport, Tom Kenny	N/A
409	December 18, 2006	Edward Norton, Jenna Fisher	N/A
410	December 19, 2006	Laura Dern, Ming Tsai, Danny Elfman	N/A
411	December 20, 2006	Paula Poundstone	Xzibit
412	December 21, 2006	Samuel L. Jackson, Avi Liberman	Hinder
413	December 22, 2006	Dominic Monaghan, Anthony Mackie	Twisted Sister
