= Harvest (1998 film) =

1998 American crime drama film

- Directed by: Stuart Barkin
- Written by: James Biederman; Stuart Barkin; David M. Korn
- Produced by: Lemore Syvan; Ron Kastner; Peter Wentworth
- Starring: Mary McCormack; John Slattery; Jeffrey DeMunn; Wil Horneff; Evan Handler; Fred Weller; James Van Der Beek
- Cinematography: Oliver Bokelberg
- Edited by: Yasmine Amitai
- Music by: Paul Rabjohns
- Production companies: Sunland Studios; Barnholtz Entertainment
- Distributed by: Goldheart Pictures; Artisan Entertainment
- Release date: June 16, 1998
- Running time: 96 minutes
- Country: United States
- Language: English

Harvest (later titled Cash Crop) is a 1998 American independent crime drama film directed by Stuart Burkin, in his directorial debut, and written by Burkin, James Biederman, and David M. Korn. It stars Mary McCormack, John Slattery, Jeffrey DeMunn, Wil Horneff, Evan Handler, Fred Weller, and James Van Der Beek.

The film focuses on a family in rural Pennsylvania who resort to growing marijuana to keep their struggling family farm afloat as other nearby farms are sold for real estate development, and a local sheriff (Slattery) who reluctantly assists a Drug Enforcement Administration (DEA) agent (McCormack) who arrives to conduct an investigation into farms around the area.

== Cast ==
- Mary McCormack as Agent Becky Anslinger
- John Slattery as Sheriff Bill Johnson
- Jeffrey DeMunn as Jake Yates
- Wil Horneff as Andy Yates
- Lisa Emery as Alice Yates
- Evan Handler as Ray Baker
- Fred Weller as Bucky Upton
- James Van Der Beek as James Peterson
- Julianne Nicholson as Lou Yates
- Anthony Ruivivar as Roberto Fuentes
- Paula Garcés as Mine Fuentes
- Bill Raymond as Roger Barnes

== Production ==
Cowriter and director Stuart Burkin came up with the story in 1993 after revisiting his upbringing in Pennsylvania, noticing farmland being bought and redeveloping into shopping centers and housing developments.

Filming took place on location in Chester County, Pennsylvania and the borough of Oxford in July of 1997.

== Release ==
The film premiered at the Florida Film Festival on June 16, 1998. It later screened at the 1999 WorldFest-Houston International Film Festival

After it was retitled as Cash Crop, the film was released on VHS and DVD in 2001 by Artisan Entertainment.

== Reception ==
The film received negative to mixed reviews.
