= List of The Late Late Show with Craig Ferguson episodes (2007) =

Release
- Original network: CBS

Season chronology
- ← Previous; 2006 episodes Next → 2008 episodes

This is the list of episodes for The Late Late Show with Craig Ferguson in 2007.

== 2007 ==
=== January ===
No.	Original release date	Guest(s)	Musical/entertainment guest(s)
414	January 2, 2007	James Denton, Dan Gabriel, Julie Gribble	N/A
415	January 3, 2007	Kate Walsh, Clark Gregg, Skyler Stone	N/A
416	January 4, 2007	Carl Reiner, Tracee Ellis Ross, Max Brooks	N/A
417	January 5, 2007	Neil Patrick Harris, Sherri Shepherd	Hellogoodbye
418	January 8, 2007	Mario Lopez, Shawn Colvin	Ne-Yo
419	January 9, 2007	Jonathan Silverman, Antonio Gates	Greg Proops
420	January 10, 2007	LL Cool J, Masi Oka	Chris Daughtry
422	January 11, 2007	Emily Watson, Ed Begley Jr., Cash Levy	N/A
423	January 12, 2007	Emily Blunt, Louis C.K.	Lady Sovereign
424	January 15, 2007	Teutul Sr. & Jr., Kelly Hu, Greg Owen	N/A
425	January 16, 2007	Helen Mirren	Steve Trevino
426	January 17, 2007	Juliette Lewis, Aaron Lewis	Common
427	January 18, 2007	Chevy Chase, Hannah Storm	Montgomery
428	January 19, 2007	Tony Gonzalez	Fantasia
429	January 29, 2007	Dylan McDermott, Connie Nielsen	Billy Bragg
430	January 30, 2007	Julie Bowen, Terry Crews, Michael Meehan	N/A
431	January 31, 2007	Chad Lowe, RZA	N/A

=== February ===
No.	Original release date	Guest(s)	Musical/entertainment guest(s)
432	February 1, 2007	Henry Winkler, Zoe Saldana	Jet
433	February 2, 2007	Jerry Springer, Robert Dubac	Aaron Lewis
434	February 5, 2007	Danny Bonaduce, Tom Lennon	Ben Garant
435	February 6, 2007	Mena Suvari, Lawrence Block	Naked Trucker
436	February 7, 2007	Bob Saget, Kaylee Defer	Jonny Lang
437	February 8, 2007	Thandie Newton	The Game
438	February 9, 2007	Eddie Griffin, Mat Kearney	Steve Mazan
439	February 12, 2007	Peter O'Toole, Joely Fisher	Dierks Bentley & The Grascals
440	February 13, 2007	Aisha Tyler, Harry Shearer, Tyler Williamson	N/A
441	February 14, 2007	David Hasselhoff, Richard Wiese	K.T. Tunstall
442	February 15, 2007	Jennifer Love Hewitt, John Cena	Three Days Grace
443	February 16, 2007	Kiefer Sutherland, Sam Tripoli	Rich Boy
444	February 19, 2007	Virginia Madsen, David Steinberg	Unwritten Law
445	February 20, 2007	Patricia Heaton, Parminder Nagra	N/A
446	February 21, 2007	Danny Bonaduce, Ioan Gruffudd	Gordie Brown
447	February 22, 2007	Mark Ruffalo, Wolfgang Puck	Tom Lennon & Ben Garant
448	February 23, 2007	Jennifer Tilly, Ami James	Rodney Atkins
449	February 26, 2007	Regis Philbin, James McAvoy	Red Jumpsuit Apparatus
450	February 27, 2007	Jill Hennessy, Oliver Hudson, Jim McDonald	N/A
451	February 28, 2007	Billy Connolly, Tricia Helfer	Blake Shelton

=== March ===
No.	Original release date	Guest(s)	Musical/entertainment guest(s)
452	March 1, 2007	Jennifer Tilly, Seth MacFarlane	The Cat Empire
453	March 2, 2007	John Mellencamp, Oscar De La Hoya	N/A
454	March 5, 2007	Jennifer Hudson, Gerard Butler	Anberlin
455	March 6, 2007	Poppy Montgomery, Jeremy Roenick, Paul Morrissey	N/A
456	March 7, 2007	Andy Garcia, Rob Corddry	N/A
457	March 8, 2007	Bill Maher, Jacinda Barrett	Razorlight
458	March 9, 2007	Kerry Washington, Jeff Applebaum	Aaron Lewis
459	March 19, 2007	Merv Griffin, Nia Long,	John Mellencamp
460	March 20, 2007	Cuba Gooding Jr., Joely Richardson	Andy Vastola
461	March 21, 2007	Tom Arnold, Drake Witham	Hinder
462	March 26, 2007	Joss Stone, Rainn Wilson	Joss Stone
463	March 27, 2007	Randy Jackson, Piper Perabo	Roy Wood Jr.
464	March 28, 2007	Sigourney Weaver, Kal Penn	The Ataris
465	March 29, 2007	Jeff Goldblum	Papa Roach
466	March 30, 2007	Chandra Wilson, Bobby Miyamoto	Bone Thugs N' Harmony

=== April ===
No.	Original release date	Guest(s)	Musical/entertainment guest(s)
467	April 2, 2007	Josh Brolin, Jason Segel, Matt Knudsen	N/A
468	April 3, 2007	Rose McGowan, Wolfgang Puck	N/A
469	April 4, 2007	Robert Rodriguez, John C. McGinley	N/A
470	April 5, 2007	Sydney Tamiia Poitier, Ice Cube	Omarion
471	April 6, 2007	Carla Gugino, Randy Couture	Redman
472	April 9, 2007	Kurt Russell, Barry Sonnenfeld	Paul Wall
473	April 10, 2007	Quentin Tarantino, Laura Prepon	N/A
474	April 11, 2007	Jeff Probst, Amy Yasbeck	Greg Warren
475	April 12, 2007	David Duchovny, Nia Long	K-os
476	April 13, 2007	Julia Louis-Dreyfus, Rodney Carrington	Cold War Kids
477	April 23, 2007	Mary Hart, Brady Quinn	The Exies
478	April 24, 2007	Paula Abdul, Vinnie Jones	Billy D. Washington
479	April 25, 2007	Jerry Springer, Mario	Simply Red
480	April 26, 2007	Jenny McCarthy, Frank McCourt	Mo Mandel
481	April 27, 2007	Jon Cryer, Boyd Matson	Good Charlotte
482	April 30, 2007	Frank Caliendo, Samantha Mathis	The Noisettes

=== May ===
No.	Original release date	Guest(s)	Musical/entertainment guest(s)
483	May 1, 2007	Tim Daly, Charlie Viracola	Joe
484	May 2, 2007	Eric Bana, Julia Sweeney	Fountains of Wayne
485	May 3, 2007	Alice Cooper, Michael Rosenbaum	Gary Gulman
486	May 4, 2007	Molly Shannon, Duane Martin	Ozomatli
487	May 7, 2007	Sophia Bush	Ne-Yo
488	May 8, 2007	Floyd Mayweather, Julianne Nicholson	Lynne Koplitz
489	May 9, 2007	Steven Wright, Carrie Ann Inaba	Dinosaur Jr.
490	May 10, 2007	Garry Shandling, Nathan Fillion	Craig Morgan
491	May 11, 2007	Larry the Cable Guy, Maureen McCormick	Montgomery Gentry
492	May 14, 2007	Carrot Top, Miranda Lambert	N/A
493	May 15, 2007	Roseanne Barr, Malachy McCourt	N/A
494	May 16, 2007	Bob Barker, Elizabeth Banks	Modest Mouse
495	May 17, 2007	Phil McGraw	Tori Amos
496	May 18, 2007	Gina Gershon, Dan Naturman	The Exies
497	May 21, 2007	Lance Burton, Matt Serra	Chantal Kreviazuk
498	May 22, 2007	Carrie Fisher, Naomie Harris, Nathan Gibson	N/A
499	May 23, 2007	Jason Randal, Cat Deeley	Albert Hammond, Jr.
500	May 24, 2007	Chi McBride, Rick Thomas	Patti Smith
501	May 25, 2007	Bob Saget, Guy Torry	Jade

=== June ===
No.	Original release date	Guest(s)	Musical/entertainment guest(s)
502	June 4, 2007	Dennis Hopper, Eddie Pence	Darryl Worley
503	June 5, 2007	Rosie Perez, David Milch	Patti Smith
504	June 6, 2007	Carl Reiner, Jonah Hill	Bright Eyes
505	June 7, 2007	Don Cheadle, Bret Michaels	Poison
506	June 8, 2007	Jon Heder, Criss Angel	N/A
507	June 11, 2007	Don Rickles, Ali Wentworth	Marty Stuart
508	June 12, 2007	Parker Posey, Ian Hunter	N/A
509	June 13, 2007	Eric Idle, S. Epatha Merkerson	Guy Torry
510	June 14, 2007	Jeff Bridges, Carrie-Anne Moss	Mute Math
511	June 15, 2007	Seth Green, Bob Barker	Henry Cho
512	June 18, 2007	Avril Lavigne, Ioan Gruffudd	Avril Lavigne
513	June 19, 2007	Drew Pinsky	Enrique Iglesias
514	June 20, 2007	Mo'Nique	Big and Rich
515	June 21, 2007	Ben Kingsley, Mary McCormack	Jesse Malin
516	June 22, 2007	Eddie Izzard, John Roy	The Goo Goo Dolls
517	June 25, 2007	Wanda Sykes, Tim Spall	Bobby Valentino
518	June 26, 2007	Janeane Garofalo, Tina Brown	Bob Marley
519	June 27, 2007	Mandy Moore, David Steinberg	N/A
520	June 28, 2007	Wayne Brady, Mary Elizabeth Winstead	Ben Kweller
521	June 29, 2007	Chris Isaak, Cory Kahaney	N/A

=== July ===
No.	Original release date	Guest(s)	Musical/entertainment guest(s)
522	July 2, 2007	Dr. Kevin Fitzgerald	Sinead O'Connor
523	July 3, 2007	Kristen Bell, Wolfgang Puck	Big and Rich
524	July 5, 2007	Brenda Blethyn, Mike Rowe	Army of Me
525	July 6, 2007	Amy Sedaris, Jackie Collins	Breaking Benjamin
526	July 9, 2007	Kathy Griffin, Ken Bruen	Marty Stuart
527	July 10, 2007	Cedric the Entertainer, Kara Cooney	Jeff Keith
528	July 11, 2007	Julie Chen, James Marsden	Sara Bareilles
529	July 12, 2007	Ted Danson, Maggie Q	Silverchair
530	July 13, 2007	Rupert Grint	Dr. Dog
531	July 23, 2007	Glenn Close, Jeffrey Ross	Lily Allen
532	July 24, 2007	Julia Stiles, Carl Bernstein	N/A
533	July 25, 2007	Jason Priestley, Sherri Shepherd	Chris Reid
534	July 26, 2007	Aaron Eckhart	Hanson
535	July 27, 2007	James Denton, Amber Stevens	The Cribs
536	July 30, 2007	Drew Carey, Megalyn Echikunwoke	N/A
537	July 31, 2007	Jon Voight, Alicia Coppola	Will Marfori

=== August ===
No.	Original release date	Guest(s)	Musical/entertainment guest(s)
538	August 1, 2007	Miss Piggy, Jonathan Silverman	Glen Hansard, Markéta Irglová
539	August 2, 2007	Julie Delpy, Alfred Molina	N/A
540	August 3, 2007	Pamela Anderson, Nellie McKay	Hans Klok, Avi Liberman
541	August 6, 2007	Kyra Sedgwick, Paula Poundstone	Emerson Drive
542	August 7, 2007	Ben Stein, Megyn Price	Rodney Laney
543	August 8, 2007	Michelle Pfeiffer, Rachel Nichols	Kat DeLuna
544	August 10, 2007	Cuba Gooding Jr., Cash Levy	Grace Potter & the Nocturnals
545	August 13, 2007	Tori Spelling	Brother Ali
546	August 14, 2007	Jonah Hill, Natascha McElhone	N/A
547	August 15, 2007	Aishwarya Rai, Dom Irrera	Lifehouse
548	August 16, 2007	Masi Oka	Emily Fox, Emerson Hart
549	August 17, 2007	Aisha Tyler, Dwayne Perkins	Augie March
550	August 20, 2007	Tony Danza, Rose Byrne	N/A
551	August 21, 2007	Nick Cannon, Alan Bean	Jeremy Fisher
552	August 22, 2007	Tom Lennon, Elizabeth Perkins	Wendy Kamenoff
553	August 23, 2007	Samuel L. Jackson	The Cliks
554	August 24, 2007	Holly Hunter, Adam Goldberg	Ferraby Lionheart

=== September ===
No.	Original release date	Guest(s)	Musical/entertainment guest(s)
554	September 10, 2007	Frank Caliendo, Sherman Alexie	Clay Walker
555	September 11, 2007	Gavin de Becker, Dwight Yoakam	N/A
556	September 12, 2007	Julie Chen, Dario Franchitti	Matt Baetz
557	September 13, 2007	Jason Alexander, Barbara Morgan, Scott Kelly	Wendy Kamenoff
558	September 14, 2007	Eric Idle, Les Stroud	Finger Eleven
559	September 17, 2007	Alan Alda, Alex O'Loughlin	N/A
560	September 18, 2007	Jeff Goldblum, Paul Haggis, Mandy Moore	N/A
561	September 19, 2007	Phil McGraw, Kaley Cuoco	Bob Dubac
562	September 20, 2007	James Woods, Ben Lee	N/A
563	September 21, 2007	Terrence Howard, Jennifer Westfeldt	Zap Mama
564	September 24, 2007	50 Cent, Emily Deschanel	N/A
565	September 25, 2007	D.L. Hughley, Kaitlin Olson, Hannibal Buress	N/A
566	September 26, 2007	Marg Helgenberger, Seth MacFarlane	The National
567	September 27, 2007	Jennifer Love Hewitt, Oliver Hudson	Cary Brothers
568	September 28, 2007	Greg Kinnear, Paul Morrissey	Raul Midon

=== October ===
No.	Original release date	Guest(s)	Musical/entertainment guest(s)
569	October 1, 2007	Juliette Lewis, David Boreanaz	N/A
570	October 2, 2007	Chi McBride, Teri Polo	Steve Bertrand
571	October 3, 2007	Kevin Smith, Tasha Smith	J.L. Cauvin
572	October 4, 2007	Anjelica Huston, Pat Monahan	Cathy Ladman
573	October 5, 2007	Josh Duhamel, Radha Mitchell	Diana Krall
574	October 8, 2007	Jimmy Smits, Michelle Monaghan	Shout Out Louds
575	October 9, 2007	Tim Daly, Nia Long	Ron Pearson
576	October 10, 2007	Fred Willard, Saffron Burrows	Modest Mouse
577	October 11, 2007	Tom Arnold, Tori Amos	N/A
577	October 12, 2007	Lt. Col Kevin Robbins	N/A
578	October 15, 2007	Michael Caine	Lizzy Cooperman
579	October 16, 2007	Vicente Fox, Leslie Bibb	Ron Pearson
580	October 17, 2007	Ian McKellen, Jena Malone	Avril Lavigne
581	October 18, 2007	John Larroquette	They Might Be Giants
582	October 19, 2007	Kenneth Branagh, Todd Sawyer	N/A
583	October 29, 2007	Kristin Chenoweth, Clive Barker	James Jonah
584	October 30, 2007	Steve Carell	Good Charlotte
585	October 31, 2007	John Lydon, Steve Jones, Joe Theisman	The Sex Pistols

=== November ===
No.	Original release date	Guest(s)	Musical/entertainment guest(s)
586	November 1, 2007	Anthony Hopkins, Yvonne Strahovski	N/A
587	November 2, 2007	Seth Green, Dwight Yoakam	N/A

There were no other episodes produced in November due to the 2007–08 Writers Guild of America strike.

=== December ===
There were no episodes produced in December due to the 2007–08 Writers Guild of America strike.
