= American International Rattlesnake Museum =

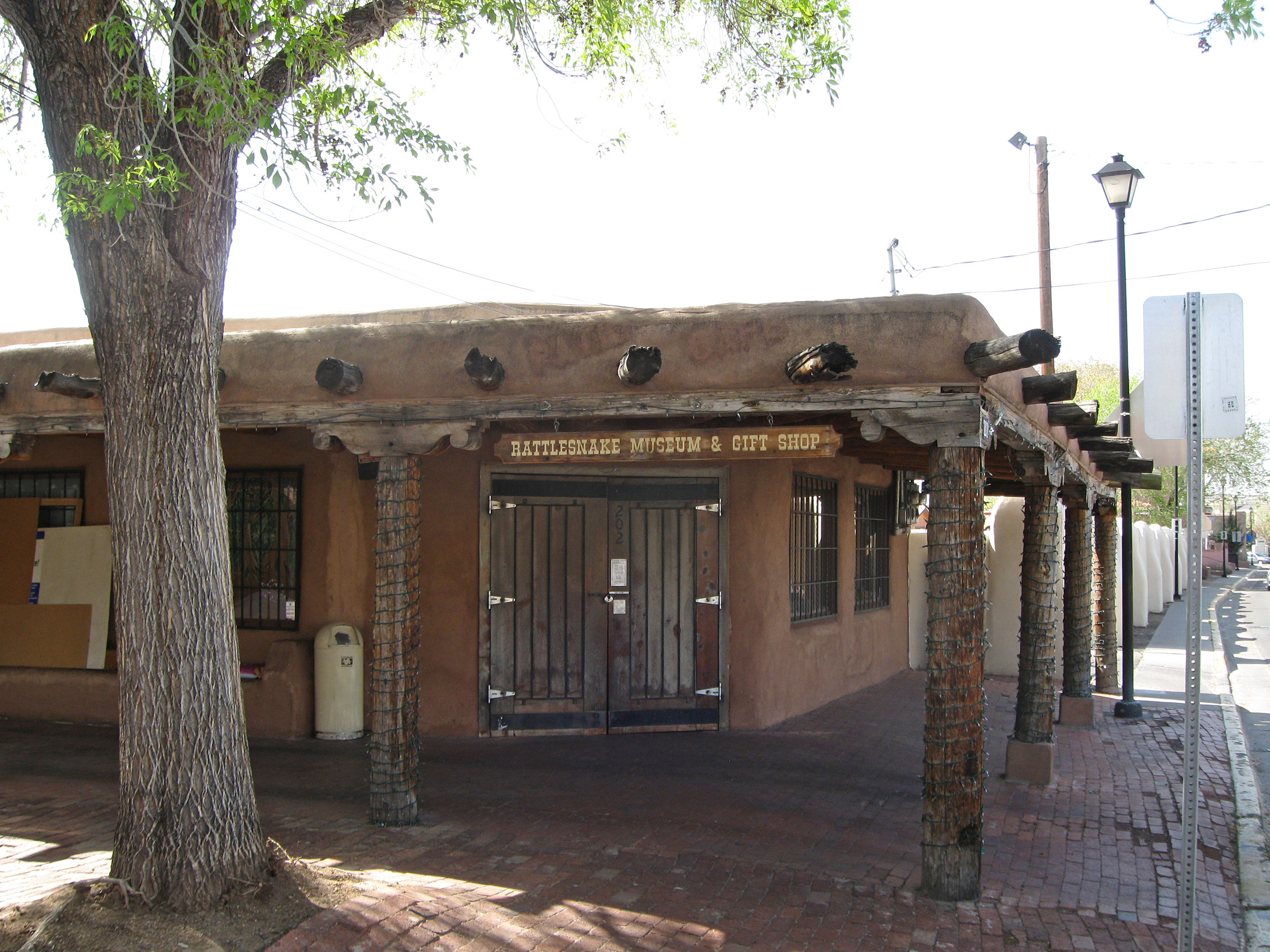
- Date opened: May 5, 1990
- Location: Albuquerque, New Mexico
- No. of species: 34 (of rattlesnakes)
- Annual visitors: 50,000
- Director: Bob Myers
- Website: www.rattlesnakes.com

The American International Rattlesnake Museum is an animal conservation museum located in Albuquerque, New Mexico in Old Town Albuquerque. The museum is devoted to snakes, particularly rattlesnakes, and is dedicated to rattlesnake education. With the staff that is a participant in regular international viper research events, the museum hosts a diverse collection of living rattlesnakes and an extensive library of study material and educational tools.

The museum has the largest collection of different species of live rattlesnakes in the world, which are presented in recreated habitats, and claims to host more rattlesnake species than the Bronx Zoo, the Philadelphia Zoo, the National Zoo in Washington, D.C., the Denver Zoo, the San Francisco Zoo, and the San Diego Zoo combined. In addition to rattlesnakes, the museum holds a live Gila monster, one of the few known venomous lizard species.

The museum also houses a large collection of snake-related artwork, artifacts, and memorabilia. The museum also contains a gift shop.

== In popular culture ==
Craig Ferguson, host of The Late Late Show with Craig Ferguson, was given a snake mug from the museum's gift shop by actress Mary McCormack on 13 April 2009. During the interview McCormack, who shot her TV show In Plain Sight in Albuquerque, told Ferguson that she and her daughters frequently visit the museum. After his last show, Ferguson donated the mug back to the museum.
