= List of The Late Late Show with Craig Ferguson episodes (2008) =

Release
- Original network: CBS

Season chronology
- ← Previous; 2007 episodes Next → 2009 episodes

This is the list of episodes for The Late Late Show with Craig Ferguson in 2008.

== 2008 ==
=== January ===
No.	Original release date	Guest(s)	Musical/entertainment guest(s)
589	January 2, 2008	None	N/A
No guests; Writers' Guild of America strike is on but Letterman's Worldwide Pants, Inc., which produces The Late Late Show and owns its timeslot, has negotiated with the WGA to pay them the wage they are demanding.
590	January 3, 2008	Dominic Monaghan, Jason Randal	N/A
591	January 4, 2008	Leonard Nimoy, Lyle Lovett	N/A
592	January 7, 2008	RZA, Greg Proops	N/A
593	January 8, 2008	Marion Cotillard, Kevin Fitzgerald	Rogue Wave
594	January 9, 2008	Emile Hirsch, Wolfgang Puck	N/A
595	January 10, 2008	Val Kilmer, Michael Gates Gill	Ian Hunter
596	January 11, 2008	Alec Baldwin, Lena Headey	Spoon
597	January 14, 2008	Ben Kingsley, Laura Prepon	Lupe Fiasco
598	January 15, 2008	Drew Carey, Seth Gabel	Kate Nash
599	January 16, 2008	James McAvoy, Jon Cryer	Blake Lewis
600	January 17, 2008	Trace Adkins, Julie Benz	N/A
601	January 18, 2008	Ted Danson, Ali Wentworth	Dean Edwards
602	January 21, 2008	Sylvester Stallone, Steve Wiebe	Ayo
603	January 22, 2008	Tony Shalhoub, Becki Newton	Ryan Sickler
604	January 23, 2008	Carmen Electra, Justin Bartha	Margaret Cho
605	January 24, 2008	Ringo Starr	Ringo Starr & His All Starr Band
606	January 25, 2008	Diane Lane, James Johan	N/A
607	January 28, 2008	Denis Leary, Bonnie Somerville	Deana Carter
608	January 29, 2008	Raquel Welch, Antonio Gates	Lyle Lovett
609	January 30, 2008	Antonio Gates, Adam Arkin	Ryan Sickler
610	January 31, 2008	Julia Louis-Dreyfus, Lindsay Sloane	Sebastian Maniscalco

=== February ===
No.	Original release date	Guest(s)	Musical/entertainment guest(s)
611	February 1, 2008	Eva Longoria Parker, Allen Covert	Al Madrigal
612	February 4, 2008	Kristen Bell	Wicked Tinkers
Video of Ferguson being sworn in as a US citizen. Ferguson describes his first solo flight. Announcement of Ferguson's being chosen to host the White House Correspondents' Association Dinner.
613	February 5, 2008	Amy Ryan, Terry Crews	Sebastian Maniscalco
614	February 6, 2008	Bradley Whitford, Lake Bell, Cynthia Littleton	N/A
615	February 7, 2008	Jon Favreau, Alicia Coppola	Shelby Lynne
616	February 8, 2008	Jessica Alba, Dierks Bentley	Mo'Nique
617	February 11, 2008	Julie Chen, Natasha Bedingfield	N/A
618	February 12, 2008	Susan Sarandon, Bonnie Somerville	N/A
619	February 13, 2008	Michael Clarke Duncan, Angela Kinsey	North Mississippi Allstars
620	February 14, 2008	Evangeline Lilly, Adam Goldberg	Bebel Gilberto
621	February 15, 2008	Jeffrey Tambor, Ivana Miličević, Bobby Miyamoto	N/A
622	February 18, 2008	Alice Cooper, Angela Kinsey	Wyclef Jean
623	February 19, 2008	Andre Benjamin, Craig Bierko	Melinda Hill
624	February 20, 2008	Tom Selleck, Dario Franchitti	Ziggy Marley
625	February 21, 2008	Don Rickles, Joe Mantegna	N/A
626	February 22, 2008	Fred Willard, Rachel Bilson	N/A
627	February 25, 2008	Jennifer Beals, Carrie Ann Inaba	Little Big Town
628	February 26, 2008	Regis Philbin	Alice Smith
629	February 27, 2008	Eric Bana, Patricia Clarkson	Barry Manilow
630	February 28, 2008	Natasha Henstridge, Carl Bernstein	Steve Mazan

=== March ===
No.	Original release date	Guest(s)	Musical/entertainment guest(s)
631	March 1, 2008	Dweezil Zappa, Jason Randal	Coolio
632	March 4, 2008	Brooke Shields, Ming Tsai	Michelle Biloon
633	March 5, 2008	Christina Ricci, Dee Dee Myers	Collective Soul
634	March 6, 2008	Dennis Hopper, Yunjin Kim	Nicole Atkins
635	March 7, 2008	Wanda Sykes, Saffron Burrows	Grizzly Bear
636	March 8, 2008	Amy Sedaris, Shanna Moakler	Blake Shelton
637	March 17, 2008	Ray Romano, Kate Flannery	Jeff Caldwell
638	March 18, 2008	Kate Beckinsale, Ken Tucker	N/A
639	March 19, 2008	Parker Posey, Graham Colton	N/A
640	March 24, 2008	Laurence Fishburne, Rashida Jones	Joe Devito
641	March 25, 2008	Thandie Newton, Dom Irrera	Bell X1
642	March 26, 2008	Pamela Anderson, Christian Siriano	Judith Smith-Levin
643	March 31, 2008	Aisha Tyler, Richard Branson	N/A

=== April ===
No.	Original release date	Guest(s)	Musical/entertainment guest(s)
644	April 1, 2008	Forest Whitaker, Jean-Michel Cousteau	Your Lips Your Lips
645	April 2, 2008	Marg Helgenberger, Kylie Minogue	Kylie Minogue
646	April 3, 2008	Jennifer Love Hewitt, Jonny Lee Miller	N/A
647	April 4, 2008	Jena Malone	Mrs. Hughes
648	April 7, 2008	Bob Saget, Jennifer Esposito	N/A
649	April 8, 2008	Anne Heche, Deion Sanders	Clinton Jackson
650	April 9, 2008	Roseanne Barr, Kaley Cuoco	Counting Crows
651	April 10, 2008	Alyson Hannigan, Todd Allen	Del the Funky Homosapian
652	April 11, 2008	Christina Applegate, Brittany Snow	Gene Pompa
653	April 14, 2008	John Waters, Daniel Lanois	N/A
654	April 15, 2008	Julie Andrews, David Krumholtz	N/A
655	April 16, 2008	Jackie Chan, Cobie Smulders	Bell X1
656	April 17, 2008	Alyssa Milano, Henry Winkler	Jason Aldean
657	April 18, 2008	Kristen Bell, Oliver Hudson	N/A
658	April 24, 2008	Ben Stein, Alicia Witt	Andrew Norelli
659	April 25, 2008	Jason Segel, Connie Schultz	N/A
660	April 28, 2008	Ewan McGregor	Morrissey, "All You Need is Me"
Monologue includes description of Ferguson's hosting the White House Correspondents' Association dinner on April 15th, with several clips. "ESPN UK" skit on "Dirk Weems," with Ewan McGregor and Philip McGrade.
661	April 29, 2008	Kathy Griffin, Scott Kennedy	Morrissey
662	April 30, 2008	Jeff Bridges, Sophia Myles	Grand Archives

=== May ===
No.	Original release date	Guest(s)	Musical/entertainment guest(s)
663	May 1, 2008	Helen Hunt, Sarah Chalke	She & Him
664	May 2, 2008	Lake Bell, Kal Penn	N/A
665	May 5, 2008	Hugh Laurie, Michael Starr	N/A
666	May 6, 2008	John Goodman, Jason Aldean	N/A
667	May 7, 2008	Felicity Huffman, Mike Doughty	N/A
668	May 8, 2008	Emily Deschanel, Melvin Lardy	N/A
669	May 9, 2008	Rachel Griffiths, Christopher Gorham	N/A
670	May 12, 2008	John Stamos, Judith Smith-Levin	Jaymay
671	May 13, 2008	John Cusack, Paraminder Nagra	N/A
672	May 14, 2008	Tony Danza, Maura Tierney	N/A
673	May 15, 2008	David Boreanaz	Carrot Top
674	May 16, 2008	Reba McEntire, Vinnie Jones	N/A
675	May 20, 2008	Paulina Porizkova, Matt Costa	N/A
676	May 21, 2008	Clay Aiken, Chelsea Handler	N/A
677	May 22, 2008	Laura Dern	k.d. lang
678	May 23, 2008	Steven Wright, Carson Kressley	N/A

=== June ===
No.	Original release date	Guest(s)	Musical/entertainment guest(s)
679	June 2, 2008	Julia Louis-Dreyfus	N/A
680	June 3, 2008	Kristin Davis, Joel McHale	Drake Witham
681	June 4, 2008	Jane Kaczmarek, Greg Proops	N/A
682	June 5, 2008	Jeff Foxworthy, Poppy Montgomery	N/A
683	June 6, 2008	Chelsea Handler, Emmanuelle Chriqui	N/A
684	June 9, 2008	Evan Handler, Betty White	MGMT
685	June 10, 2008	Rachel Dratch, Carl Reiner	Augustana
686	June 11, 2008	Stockard Channing, Bill Engvall	N/A
687	June 12, 2008	Jenna Fischer, Wolfgang Puck	N/A
688	June 13, 2008	Elizabeth Perkins	Coolio
689	June 16, 2008	Alfred Molina, Salman Rushdie	N/A
690	June 17, 2008	John Hiatt, Virginia Madsen, Darin Strauss	N/A
691	June 18, 2008	Don Cheadle, Olivia Thirlby	N/A
692	June 19, 2008	Lewis Black, Billy Bob Thornton	The Boxmasters
693	June 20, 2008	Jeffrey Tambor	The Fratellis
694	June 23, 2008	David Hasselhoff, Miriam Shor	Amos Lee
695	June 24, 2008	Lawrence Block, Chris O'Donnell	Phantom Planet
696	June 25, 2008	Stanley Bing, Sigourney Weaver	Three 6 Mafia
697	June 26, 2008	James McAvoy, Bengt Washburn	N/A
698	June 27, 2008	Holly Hunter	N/A
699	June 30, 2008	Tricia Helfer, Steven Wright	N/A

=== July ===
No.	Original release date	Guest(s)	Musical/entertainment guest(s)
700	July 1, 2008	Tyler Matthew Davis, Richard Lewis	Duffy
701	July 14, 2008	Chris Isaak, Debbie Reynolds	N/A
702	July 15, 2008	Julie Andrews, Raymond Crowe	N/A
703	July 16, 2008	Ben Kingsley	Popovich Comedy Pet Theater
704	July 17, 2008	Ron Perlman, Rita Rudner	N/A
705	July 18, 2008	Criss Angel, Mary Steenburgen	N/A
706	July 21, 2008	Jarod Miller, Aisha Tyler	Keaton Simons
707	July 22, 2008	Julie Chen, Adam Scott	Ricky Skaggs
708	July 23, 2008	Val Kilmer, Les Stroud	Curt Smith
709	July 24, 2008	Lance Morrow, Amanda Peet	N/A
710	July 25, 2008	Xzibit	Griffin House
711	July 28, 2008	Eric Idle, Nancy Travis	N/A
712	July 29, 2008	Belinda Carlisle, Jet Li	Belinda Carlisle
713	July 30, 2008	Tom Sullivan, Michelle Yeoh	Jakob Dylan
714	July 31, 2008	Jean-Michel Cousteau, Will Ferrell	N/A

=== August ===
No.	Original release date	Guest(s)	Musical/entertainment guest(s)
715	August 1, 2008	Rainn Wilson, Cory Kahaney	The Hold Steady
716	August 4, 2008	Cheryl Hines, Harry Shearer	N/A
717	August 5, 2008	Regis Philbin, Paula Patton	N/A
718	August 6, 2008	Eddie Izzard, Julie Chen	Jamie Lidell
719	August 7, 2008	Jack Black, Kate Mara	Conor Oberst
720	August 8, 2008	Toby Keith	Toby Keith
721	August 11, 2008	Robert Downey Jr., Amy Smart	N/A
722	August 12, 2008	Kate Mara, Kiefer Sutherland	N/A
723	August 13, 2008	Julie Chen, Craig Robinson	N/A
724	August 14, 2008	Ben Kingsley, Idina Menzel	N/A
725	August 15, 2008	Radha Mitchell, Aaron Karo	N/A

=== September ===
No.	Original release date	Guest(s)	Musical/entertainment guest(s)
726	September 1, 2008	Julie Bowen, Jonathan Winters	Priscilla Ahn
727	September 2, 2008	Katey Sagal, Nathan Fillion	N/A
728	September 3, 2008	Julie Chen, Maria Bello	Shelby Lynne
729	September 4, 2008	Eva Longoria, Neal McDonough	N/A
730	September 5, 2008	Kal Penn	Gabe Dixon Band
731	September 8, 2008	Neil Patrick Harris, Sophia Myles	N/A
732	September 9, 2008	Russell Brand, Margaret Cho	N/A
733	September 10, 2008	Alice Cooper, AnnaLynne McCord	N/A
734	September 11, 2008	Lynn Ferguson, Lance Morrow	N/A
735	September 12, 2008	Seann William Scott, Lena Heady	N/A
736	September 15, 2008	Julie Chen, Jason Biggs	The Ting Tings
737	September 16, 2008	Paulina Porizkova, Ken Tucker	Tally Hall
738	September 17, 2008	Alan Alda, Illeana Douglas	N/A
739	September 18, 2008	Jason Segel	Dr Dog, Steve Hofstetter
740	September 19, 2008	Kristen Bell, Josh Radnor	N/A
741	September 22, 2008	Denis Leary, Marianne Jean-Baptiste	N/A
742	September 23, 2008	John Krasinski, Lisa Masterson	N/A
743	September 24, 2008	Michael Clarke Duncan, Shirley Manson	Jamie Lidell
744	September 25, 2008	Tim Gunn, Elizabeth Reaser	N/A
745	September 26, 2008	Drew Carey, Tony Parker	Lady Antebellum
746	September 29, 2008	Melina Kanakaredes, Gina Carano	Amy Macdonald
747	September 30, 2008	Tim Daly, Anna Friel	Alice Cooper

=== October ===
No.	Original release date	Guest(s)	Musical/entertainment guest(s)
748	October 1, 2008	Jennifer Love Hewitt, Jim Parsons	N/A
749	October 2, 2008	Lauren Graham, Patrick Pedraja	Michael Franti & Spearhead
750	October 3, 2008	Margaret Cho, Randy Newman	Randy Newman
751	October 7, 2008	Seth Green, Betty White	Smothers Brothers
752	October 8, 2008	Thandie Newton, Barry Sonnenfeld	Jim Bianco
753	October 9, 2008	Rufus Sewell	Natasha Bedingfield
754	October 10, 2008	Russell Crowe, Jennifer Esposito	N/A
755	October 11, 2008	Matt Lucas & David Walliams, Tom Morello	N/A
756	October 20, 2008	Dee Dee Myers, Noah Emmerich	N/A
757	October 21, 2008	Rachael Ray, Leanne Marshall	Laura Marling
758	October 22, 2008	Chris Matthews, Christopher Mintz-Plasse	N/A
759	October 23, 2008	John Malkovich	Little Jackie
760	October 24, 2008	Mo'Nique	Bill Santiago, Lenka
761	October 27, 2008	Kathy Griffin, Carl Bernstein	N/A
762	October 28, 2008	Pepe the King Prawn, Saffron Burrows	X
763	October 29, 2008	Ben Stein, Parminder Nagra	The New York Dolls
764	October 30, 2008	Kevin Smith, Kaitlin Olson	N/A
765	October 31, 2008	Lauren Graham	The Damned

=== November ===
No.	Original release date	Guest(s)	Musical/entertainment guest(s)
766	November 3, 2008	Bill Maher	N/A
767	November 5, 2008	Paris Hilton, Drew Pinsky	N/A
768	November 6, 2008	Elizabeth Banks, Jay Mohr	N/A
769	November 7, 2008	Christian Slater, Luke Dempsey	Eric Hutchinson
770	November 10, 2008	Mark Harmon, Ron White	N/A
771	November 11, 2008	Coolio, Tom Dreesen and Tim Reid	Coolio
772	November 12, 2008	Seann William Scott	Kathy Kinney
773	November 13, 2008	Andy Richter	Cold War Kids
774	November 14, 2008	Jim Parsons	Ray Davies
775	November 17, 2008	Poppy Montgomery, Nick Hornby	N/A
776	November 18, 2008	Steve Harvey, Sarah Shahi	The Bacon Brothers
777	November 19, 2008	James Lipton, Sara Gilbert	Sarah McLachlan
778	November 20, 2008	Larry the Cable Guy	Third Day
779	November 21, 2008	George Hamilton, Cobie Smulders	N/A
780	November 24, 2008	Eamonn Walker	Low vs Diamond
781	November 25, 2008	Neil Patrick Harris	Julia Fordham
782	November 26, 2008	Adam Arkin, Jen Kirkman	Adele
783	November 27, 2008	Tony Curtis, Megalyn Echikunwoke	Oppenheimer
784	November 28, 2008	Kristin Chenoweth, Diedrich Bader	N/A

=== December ===
No.	Original release date	Guest(s)	Musical/entertainment guest(s)
785	December 8, 2008	Chi McBride	Seal
786	December 9, 2008	Elizabeth Banks, Ken Tucker	N/A
787	December 10, 2008	Alfred Molina	Tokyo Police Club
788	December 11, 2008	Brooke Shields, Dom Irrera	N/A
789	December 12, 2008	Carrie Fisher	Julie Benz
790	December 15, 2008	Carmen Electra, Dennis Lehane	N/A
791	December 16, 2008	Don Rickles, Joanna Garcia	N/A
792	December 17, 2008	Samuel L. Jackson	Death Cab for Cutie
793	December 18, 2008	Julia Ormond, Michael Connelly	N/A
794	December 19, 2008	Jeffrey Tambor, Patrick Keane (comedian)	N/A
795	December 22, 2008	Joel McHale	Matt Nathanson
796	December 23, 2008	Billy Bob Thornton	Conor Oberst
797	December 26, 2008	Kristen Bell, Wolfgang Puck	N/A
