= Mary McCormack =

American actress (born 1969)

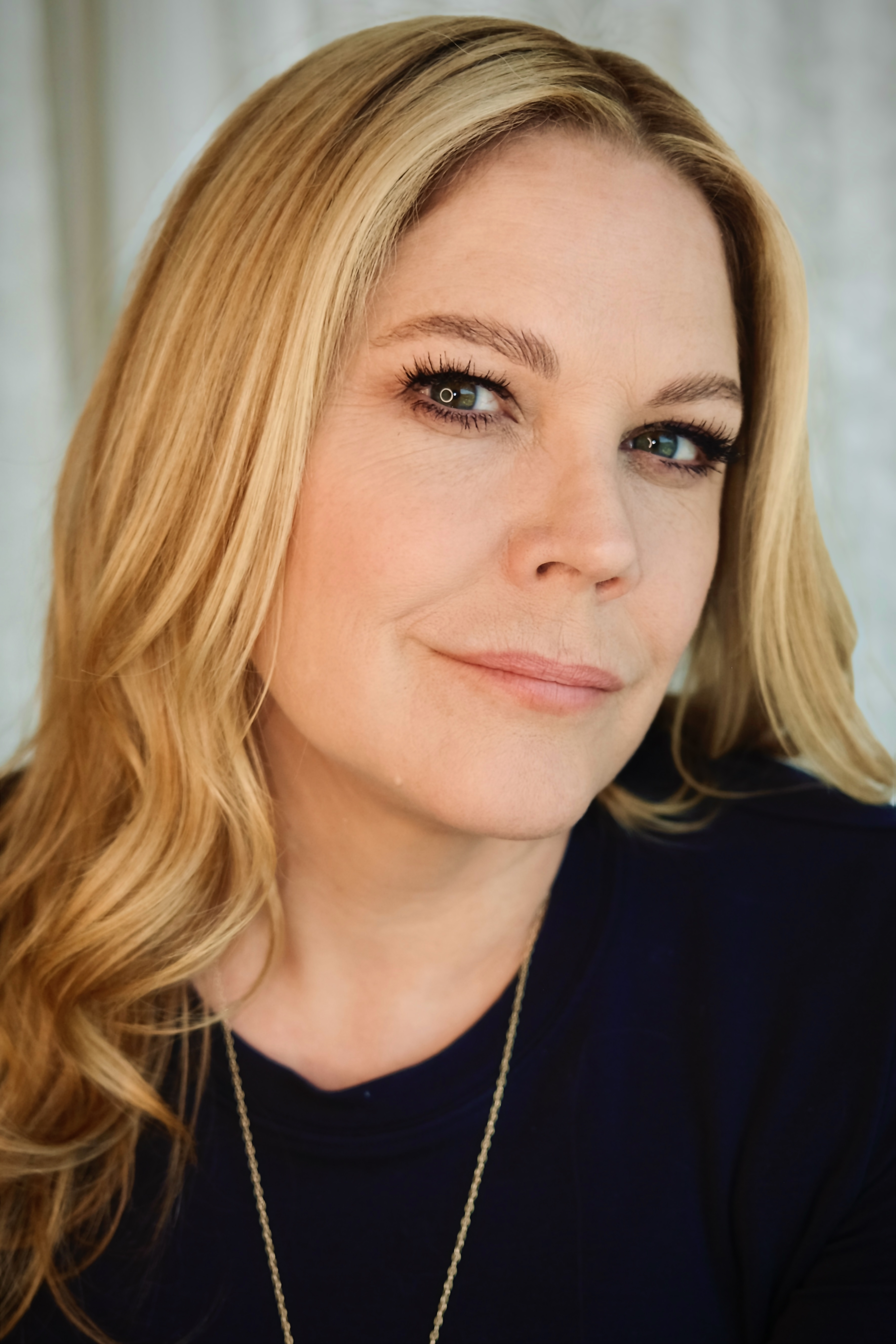
- McCormack in 2022
- Born: February 8, 1969 (age 57); Plainfield, New Jersey, U.S.
- Citizenship: American
- Education: Trinity College (BA)
- Occupation: Actress
- Years active: 1994–present
- Spouse: Michael Morris (m. 2003)
- Children: 3
- Relatives: Bridget Mary McCormack (sister); Will McCormack (brother)

Mary McCormack (born February 8, 1969) is an American actress.

She has had leading roles as Justine Appleton on the series Murder One (1995–1997), as Deputy National Security Adviser Kate Harper on The West Wing (2004–2006), as Deputy U.S. Marshal Mary Shannon on In Plain Sight (2008–2012), and as Peggy on the comedy series The Kids Are Alright (2018–2019).

McCormack's film roles include Private Parts (1997), Deep Impact (1998), True Crime (1999), Mystery, Alaska (1999), K-PAX (2001), Dickie Roberts: Former Child Star (2003), and 1408 (2007).

== Early life and education ==
McCormack was born in Plainfield, New Jersey. She is the daughter of Norah and William McCormack. Her parents divorced in 1990. Her sister Bridget is a now-retired chief justice of the Michigan Supreme Court and former professor of law at the University of Michigan Law School. Her brother William is an actor, writer and producer who has appeared in a recurring role as FBI agent Robert O'Connor on In Plain Sight.

In 1987, McCormack graduated from the Wardlaw-Hartridge School in Edison, New Jersey. In 1991, she received her bachelor of arts degree in comparative arts, specifically painting and creative writing, from Trinity College in Hartford, Connecticut.

== Career ==
McCormack began her acting career at age 12, performing in Gian Carlo Menotti's Christmas opera Amahl and the Night Visitors. She continued her stage work in musicals and finished an acting program at the William Esper Studio. She has worked in New York City theater productions, including the Atlantic Theater Company, Alice's 4th Floor, and Naked Angels, where she appeared in Jon Robin Baitz's A Fair Country.

McCormack portrayed Justine Appleton on Murder One (1995–1997) and also starred in the HBO series K Street. She starred in Howard Stern's movie Private Parts in 1997. In 2004, McCormack joined the cast of The West Wing as deputy national security advisor and ex-CIA officer Kate Harper. Her character soon became a recurring role throughout the last three seasons.

McCormack starred in the USA Network series In Plain Sight. She portrayed Mary Shannon, a deputy United States marshal attached to the Albuquerque, New Mexico, office of the Federal Witness Security Program (WITSEC), more commonly known as the Federal Witness Protection Program. On July 28, 2010, the show was renewed for its fourth and fifth seasons, to run in 2011 and 2012. The show was ended in 2011, making the fifth season its last. After its end, McCormack was cast as the lead in Kari Lizer's untitled comedy pilot on ABC.

McCormack was nominated for the 2008 Tony Award for Best Performance by a Featured Actress in a Play for the role of Gretchen in the 2008 Broadway revival of Boeing Boeing.

McCormack appeared seven times as a guest on The Late Late Show with Craig Ferguson. On her fourth visit in 2009, she gave the host, Craig Ferguson, a novelty coffee mug in the shape of a rattlesnake from the gift shop of the American International Rattlesnake Museum in Albuquerque. Ferguson promised to use this mug on all future shows and kept his promise. After his last show, he donated the mug back to the museum.

In 2012, McCormack reunited with the cast of The West Wing to film a video that served both as a reminder that U.S. voters should vote for nonpartisan candidates when they cast their ballots and as a video promoting McCormack's sister's ultimately successful judicial candidacy for the Michigan State Supreme Court.

In October 2013, McCormack started filming scenes for The Crash (previously titled A Conspiracy on Jekyll Island) alongside Frank Grillo, AnnaSophia Robb, Minnie Driver, Dianna Agron, John Leguizamo, Ed Westwick, Christopher McDonald and Maggie Q. The film is directed by Aram Rappaport and produced by Hilary Shor, Atit Shah and Aaron Becker. The film had a direct-to-VOD and limited release on January 13, 2017, in North America.

In 2016, McCormack played a supporting role in the Amazon.com exclusive special An American Girl Story – Maryellen 1955: Extraordinary Christmas alongside Alyvia Alyn Lind, who played the title character.

In 2018, McCormack began starring in the ABC sitcom The Kids Are Alright as Catholic family matriarch Peggy Cleary. ABC canceled the series after one season.

In 2021, McCormack began starring in the Starz drama Heels as Willie Day, the protagonist's business partner. Starz canceled the series after two seasons.

== Personal life ==
In July 2003, McCormack married director and producer Michael Morris. Together they have three children.

McCormack and Morris are executive producers of the game show 25 Words or Less, hosted by Meredith Vieira. McCormack is a frequent celebrity panelist on the show, as are fellow executive producers Lisa Kudrow and Dan Bucatinsky.

McCormack is the godmother of In Plain Sight co-star Fred Weller's daughter.

== Filmography ==
=== Film ===
Year	Title	Role	Notes
1994	Miracle on 34th Street	Myrna Foy	
1995	Backfire!	Sarah Jackson	
1997	Colin Fitz Lives!	Moira	
1997	Private Parts	Alison Stern	
1997	Fathers' Day	Virginia Farrell	Uncredited
1997	The Alarmist	Sally	
1998	Deep Impact	Andrea Baker	
1998	Harvest	Agent Becka Anslinger	
1999	Getting to Know You	Leila Lee	
1999	True Crime	Michelle Ziegler	
1999	Mystery, Alaska	Donna Biebe	
1999	The Big Tease	Monique	
2000	Other Voices	Anna	
2000	The Broken Hearts Club: A Romantic Comedy	Anne	
2000	Gun Shy	Gloria Minetti-Nesstra	
2000	East of A	Daphne	
2001	BigLove	Phoebe	Short film
2001	High Heels and Low Lifes	Frances	
2001	World Traveler	Margaret	
2001	K-PAX	Rachel Powell	
2002	Full Frontal	Linda	
2003	Dickie Roberts: Former Child Star	Grace Finney	
2005	Madison	Bonnie McCormick	
2006	Right at Your Door	Lexi	
2006	For Your Consideration	Pilgrim Woman	
2007	1408	Lily	
2009	Streetcar	Casting Director	Short film
2012	Should've Been Romeo	Ellen	
2014	Scooby-Doo! WrestleMania Mystery	Ms. Richards	
2015	A Country Called Home	Amanda	
2016	An American Girl Story – Maryellen 1955: Extraordinary Christmas	Kay Larkin	
2017	The Crash	Sarah Schwab	
2017	Drone	Ellen Wistin	
2017	Alien Code	Rebecca Stillman	
2020	Unpregnant	Debra Clarke	
2025	Vicious	Mother	

=== Television ===
Year	Title	Role	Notes
1994	Law & Order	Rickie	Episode: "Doubles"
1995	The Wright Verdicts	Beth Eckhart	Episode: "Family Matters"
1995–1997	Murder One	Justine Appleton	Main role; 41 episodes
1997	Murder One: Diary of a Serial Killer	Justine Appleton	TV mini-series
2001	More, Patience	Patience More	TV movie
2002	Julie Lydecker	Julie Lydecker	TV movie
2003	K Street	Maggie Morris	Main role; 10 episodes
2003, 2006	ER	Debbie	Recurring role; 6 episodes
2004	Traffic	Carole McKay	TV mini-series Nominated – Prism Award for Performance in a TV Movie or Miniseries (2005)
2004–2006	The West Wing	Kate Harper	Recurring role (season 5); main role (seasons 6–7); 48 episodes Nominated – Screen Actors Guild Award for Outstanding Performance by an Ensemble in a Drama Series (2005, 2006)
2008	Law & Order: Criminal Intent	Deputy US Marshal Mary Shannon	Episode: "Contract"
2008–2012	In Plain Sight	Deputy US Marshal Mary Shannon	Lead role; 61 episodes Nominated – Prism Award for Performance in a Drama Episode (2009)
2013	Welcome to the Family	Caroline Yoder	Main role; 5 episodes
2013	Escape from Polygamy	Leann	TV movie
2014	Scandal	Lisa Elliot	Episode: "The State of the Union"
2014	The Newsroom	Molly	2 episodes
2015	House of Lies	Denna Altshuler	Recurring role; 7 episodes
2016	Divorce	Kathy DeSantis	Episode: "Weekend Plans"
2016–2017	Chelsea	Herself	Recurring role; 8 episodes
2016–2017	Angie Tribeca	Abigail Liukin	Recurring role; 3 episodes
2017	When We Rise	Roberta Kaplan	TV mini-series
2017	Loaded	Casey	Main role; 8 episodes
2018–present	25 Words or Less	Herself	Recurring guest, also executive producer
2018	Falling Water	Taylor Bennett	Recurring role; 8 episodes
2018–2019	Will & Grace	Janet Adler	2 episodes
2018	For the People	Chloe Daniels	Episode: "The Library Fountain"
2018–2019	The Kids Are Alright	Peggy Cleary	Main role, 23 episodes
2019	Into the Dark	Lilith	Episode: "Treehouse"
2021–2023	Heels	Willie Day	Main role, 16 episodes
2026	The Pitt	Dr. Linda Conley	2 episodes

As a producer
Year	Title	Notes
2010	In Plain Sight	Episode: "Father Goes West"

== Theater ==
Year	Title	Role	Notes
1999	Cabaret	Sally Bowles	Replacement
2008	Boeing-Boeing	Gretchen	
