= Kara Cooney =

American egyptologist

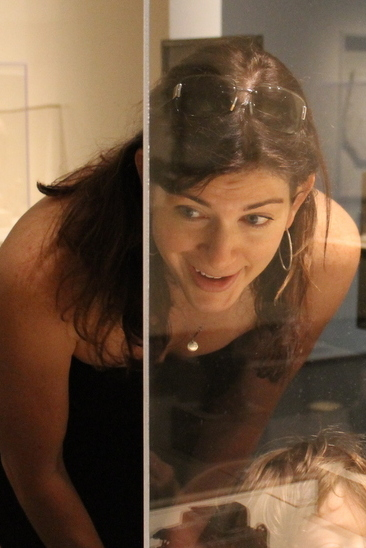
- Kara Cooney presenting at the Los Angeles County Museum of Art, June 2014
- Born: Kathlyn Cooney
- Education: University of Texas at Austin (BA); Johns Hopkins University (PhD)
- Occupations: Egyptologist and Assistant Professor of Egyptian Art and Architecture at UCLA
- Website: karacooneyofficial.com

Kathlyn M. (Kara) Cooney is an American Egyptologist and archaeologist. She is a professor of Egyptian Art and Architecture at the University of California, Los Angeles (UCLA) specializing in craft production, coffin studies, and economies in the ancient world, particularly the Ramesside era (Nineteenth through Twentieth Dynasties) and chair of the Department of Near Eastern Language and Cultures at UCLA. As well as for her scholarly work, she is known for hosting television shows on ancient Egypt on the Discovery Channel as well as for writing a popular-press book on the subject.

== Education and career ==
Raised in Houston, she obtained her Bachelor of Arts in German and Humanities from the University of Texas at Austin in 1994. She was awarded a PhD in 2002 by Johns Hopkins University for Near Eastern Studies. She was part of an archaeological team excavating at the artisans' village of Deir el Medina in Egypt, as well as Dahshur and various tombs at Thebes. In 2002 she was Kress Fellow at the National Gallery of Art and worked on the preparation of the Cairo Museum exhibition Quest for Immortality: Treasures of Ancient Egypt. After a temporary one-year position at UCLA, she took a three-year postdoctoral teaching position at Stanford University, during which, In 2005, she acted as fellow curator for Tutankhamun and the Golden Age of the Pharaohs at the Los Angeles County Museum of Art. She also worked for two years at the Getty Center before landing a tenure-track position at UCLA in 2009. Cooney's current research in coffin reuse, primarily focusing on the 20th Dynasty, is ongoing. Her research investigates the socioeconomic and political turmoil that have plagued the period, ultimately affecting funerary and burial practices in ancient Egypt. She currently resides in Los Angeles.

== Television ==
She hosted two Discovery Channel documentary series: Out of Egypt, first aired in August 2009, and Egypt's Lost Queen, which also featured Zahi Hawass.

== Books ==
- Cooney, Kathlyn M. (2007). The Cost of Death: The Social and Economic Value of Ancient Egyptian Funerary Art in the Ramesside Period. Egyptologische Uitgaven. Vol. 22. Leiden: Nederlands Instituut voor het Nabije Oosten. ISBN 978-90-6258-222-8.
- Cooney, Kara (2015). The Woman Who Would be King. Oneworld Publications. ISBN 978-1-78074-651-7.
- Cooney, Kara (2018). When Women Ruled the World: Six Queens of Egypt. Washington, D.C.: National Geographic. ISBN 978-1-4262-1977-1.
- Cooney, Kara (2021). The Good Kings: Absolute Power in Ancient Egypt and the Modern World. National Geographic. ISBN 9781426221965.
- Cooney, Kara (2024). Recycling for Death: Coffin Reuse in Ancient Egypt and the Theban Royal Caches. The American University of Cairo Press. ISBN 9781649031280.

== Personal ==
Cooney's paternal grandparents were from County Cork in Ireland. She is named after her Irish-Protestant grandmother Kathlyn Mary, who was disowned by her family for marrying Cooney’s Irish-Catholic grandfather James. Her mother is Italian, her grandmother was from the Abruzzi region, and her grandfather from Naples. She uses the name Kathlyn for her scholarly work, and her nickname Kara for professional but non-academic work.
