= Connie Schultz =

American journalist (born 1957)

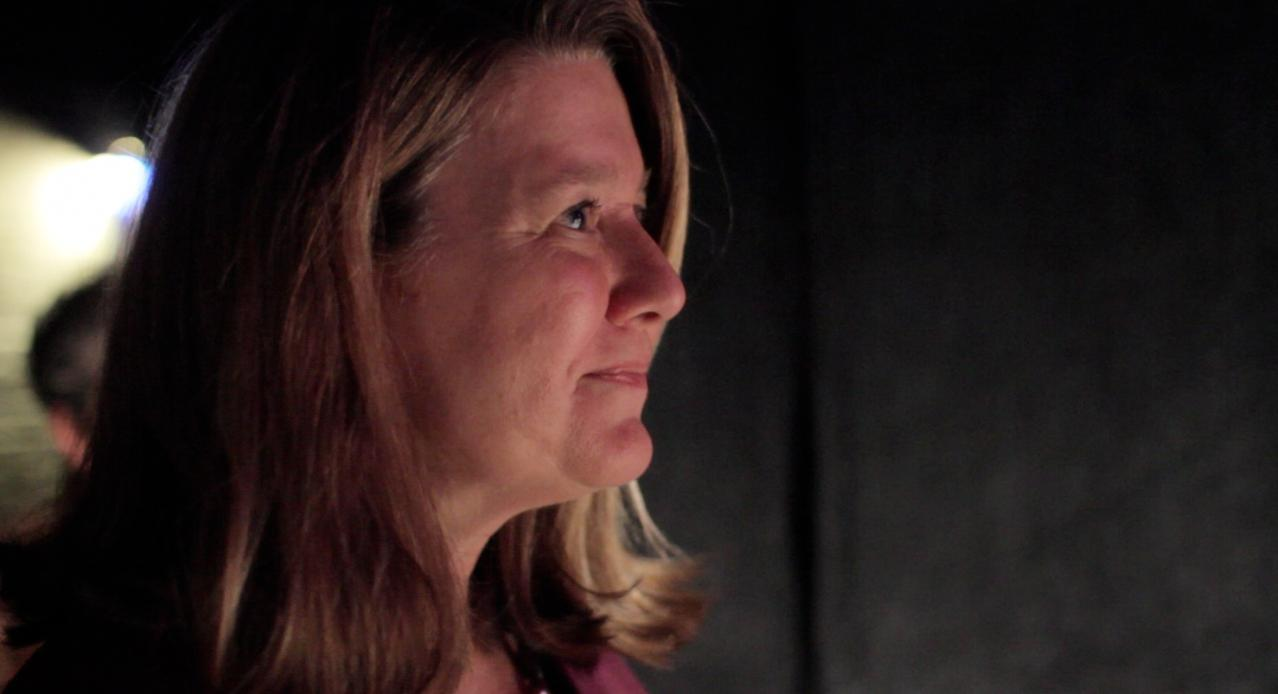
- Schultz in 2010
- Born: July 21, 1957 (age 69); Ashtabula, Ohio, U.S.
- Education: Kent State University
- Spouse: Sherrod Brown (m. 2004)
- Awards: Pulitzer Prize (2005); Scripps Howard Award (2005)

Connie Schultz (born July 21, 1957) is an American writer, journalist, and educator. Schultz has been a columnist for several publications. After several years as a freelance writer, Schultz became a columnist at Cleveland's daily newspaper, The Plain Dealer, a role she held from 1993 to 2011, winning the 2005 Pulitzer Prize for Commentary for "her pungent columns that provided a voice for the underdog and underprivileged". She also wrote for USA Today and had a syndicated column for Creators Syndicate.

Schultz is also a journalism professor. After several years at Kent State University, her alma mater, Schultz now teaches journalism at Denison University.

== Early life ==
Connie Schultz was born to Alvina Jane (née BeBout) and Charles Craig Schultz. She is the oldest of four siblings. In 1975, Schultz graduated from Ashtabula High School. In 1979, Schultz received a B.A. in journalism and political science from Kent State University.

== Career ==
Schultz started her career as a freelance writer (from 1978 to 1993) and then became a columnist for The Plain Dealer in 1993, a role she held until 2011.

Schultz is married to Sherrod Brown, former Democratic U.S. Senator, and current Democratic U.S. Senator-elect, from Ohio. Because of her husband's 2006 Senate campaign, Brown took a leave of absence from The Plain Dealer to campaign for his election. She returned to The Plain Dealer in January 2007. On September 19, 2011, Brown again resigned from the paper, having written in a note to colleagues that "in recent weeks, it has become painfully clear that my independence, professionally and personally, is possible only if I'm no longer writing for the newspaper that covers my husband's Senate race on a daily basis".

After leaving The Plain Dealer, Schultz wrote a column called "Views" for Parade. She also contributed to the online political blog The Huffington Post. For a number of years, she wrote a weekly print column, syndicated through Creators Syndicate. In June 2021, Brown became an opinion columnist for USA Today. Schultz is a frequent guest on various cable news programs, including on C-SPAN (see "External Links" below).

Schultz taught journalism at her alma mater, Kent State University, for seven years, departing at the conclusion of the spring 2023 semester; as of the fall 2023 semester, she joined the faculty at Denison University, in Granville, Ohio.

=== Books ===
Schultz’s first book, Life Happens: And Other Unavoidable Truths, a collection of her previously published columns, was printed in 2006. Her second book, ... and His Lovely Wife: A Memoir from the Woman Beside the Man, a journal of her experiences on the campaign trail, was released in 2007.

Her third book and first novel, The Daughters of Erietown, was published in June 2020. The novel is set in northeastern Ohio, and follows the lives of three generations of women.

In February 2024, Schultz’s first children's book, Lola and the Troll, was published.

== Recognition ==
Brown won the 2004 Batten Medal. In 2005, for commentary, Schultz won the Pulitzer Prize, the Scripps Howard Award, and the National Headliners Award.

On May 18, 2014, Schultz was presented with an honorary doctor of letters degree from Otterbein University. Along with her husband, Schultz gave a keynote address at the undergraduate commencement.

== Personal life ==
Schultz's first marriage, to a law professor at Cleveland State Law school where she was a law student, ended in divorce. Schultz later left law school without a degree. She married Sherrod Brown in 2004. She and Brown each brought two children to the relationship, which included a stepchild from Schultz’ first marriage. She has eight grandchildren, and is a member of the United Church of Christ.

== Works ==
- Life Happens: And Other Unavoidable Truths, Random House (April 18, 2006) ISBN 978-1-4000-6497-7
- ... and His Lovely Wife: A Memoir from the Woman Beside the Man, Random House (June 19, 2007) ISBN 978-1-4000-6573-8
- The Daughters of Erietown: A Novel, Random House (June 9, 2020) ISBN 978-0-5254-7935-2
