= List of Comedy Central Presents episodes =

This article is a list of Comedy Central Presents episodes.

== Series overview ==
Series	Episodes	Originally released		Time slot
Series	Episodes	First released	Last released	Time slot
1	8	1 December 1998	19 January 1999	TBA
2	12	29 May 1999	4 September 1999	Tuesdays, 10:30 pm
3	16	8 June 2000	21 September 2000	TBA
4	8	3 December 2000	21 January 2001	TBA
5	16	25 June 2001	15 October 2001	TBA
6	11	22 April 2002	1 July 2002	TBA
7	28	6 February 2003	4 September 2003	TBA
8	28	30 January 2004	28 May 2004	TBA
9	24	25 September 2004	22 July 2005	TBA
10	24	17 February 2006	5 May 2006	TBA
11	20	12 January 2007	6 April 2007	TBA
12	24	11 January 2008	11 April 2008	TBA
13	24	9 January 2009	3 April 2009	TBA
14	24	19 February 2010	7 May 2010	TBA
15	16	21 January 2011	25 March 2011	TBA

== Episodes ==
=== Season 1 (1998–99) ===
No. overall	No. in season	Performer	Original release date
1	1	Wanda Sykes	1 December 1998
2	2	Marc Maron	8 December 1998
3	3	Reggie McFadden	15 December 1998
4	4	Lewis Black	22 December 1998
5	5	Greg Fitzsimmons	29 December 1998
6	6	Mitch Hedberg	5 January 1999
7	7	Sue Murphy	12 January 1999
8	8	Kevin Brennan	19 January 1999

=== Season 2 (1999) ===
No. overall	No. in season	Performer	Original release date
9	1	Kevin Nealon	29 May 1999
10	2	Margaret Smith	5 June 1999
11	3	Mark Curry	12 June 1999
12	4	Greg Proops	19 June 1999
13	5	Hugh Fink	26 June 1999
14	6	Kevin Meaney	3 July 1999
15	7	Dave Attell	10 July 1999
16	8	Mario Cantone	17 July 1999
17	9	Todd Barry	24 July 1999
18	10	Patton Oswalt	10 May 1999
19	11	Elvira Kurt	28 May 1999
20	12	Jack Coen	4 September 1999

=== Season 3 (2000) ===
No. overall	No. in season	Performer	Original release date
21	1	Lewis Black	8 June 2000
22	2	Steve Marmel	15 June 2000
23	3	Jeremy Hotz	20 June 2000
24	4	Dane Cook	27 June 2000
25	5	Kathleen Madigan	4 July 2000
26	6	Jim Gaffigan	11 July 2000
27	7	Dom Irrera	18 July 2000
28	8	Ralph Harris	25 July 2000
29	9	Stephen Lynch	1 August 2000
30	10	Greg Giraldo	8 August 2000
31	11	Victoria Jackson	15 August 2000
32	12	Don 'D.C.' Curry	24 August 2000
33	13	Johnny Sanchez	31 August 2000
34	14	Brian Regan	7 September 2000
35	15	Judy Gold	14 September 2000
36	16	Arj Barker	21 September 2000

=== Season 4 (2000–01) ===
No. overall	No. in season	Performer	Original release date
37	1	Darrell Hammond	3 December 2000
38	2	Jim David	10 December 2000
39	3	René Hicks	17 December 2000
40	4	Pablo Francisco	24 December 2000
41	5	Adam Ferrara	31 December 2000
42	6	Nick Swardson	7 January 2001
43	7	Greg Behrendt	14 January 2001
44	8	Sabrina Matthews	21 January 2001

=== Season 5 (2001) ===
No. overall	No. in season	Performer	Original release date
45	1	The Amazing Johnathan	25 June 2001
46	2	Maria Bamford	2 July 2001
47	3	The Sklar Brothers	9 July 2001
48	4	Slovin & Allen	16 July 2001
49	5	Louis Ramey	30 July 2001
50	6	Tom Rhodes	6 August 2001
51	7	Ted Alexandro	13 August 2001
52	8	Tony Woods	20 August 2001
53	9	Tom Papa	27 August 2001
54	10	Louis C.K.	3 September 2001
55	11	Bil Dwyer	10 September 2001
56	12	Zach Galifianakis	17 September 2001
57	13	Doug Stanhope	24 September 2001
58	14	Gary Valentine	1 October 2001
59	15	Ardal O'Hanlon	8 October 2001
60	16	Todd Glass	15 October 2001

=== Season 6 (2002) ===
No. overall	No. in season	Performer	Original release date
61	1	Lewis Black	22 April 2002
62	2	Seán Cullen	29 April 2002
63	3	Richard Jeni	6 May 2002
64	4	Mike Britt	13 May 2002
65	5	Lenny Clarke	20 May 2002
66	6	Adele Givens	27 May 2002
67	7	Nick DiPaolo	3 June 2002
68	8	Brian Posehn	10 June 2002
69	9	Gilbert Gottfried	17 June 2002
70	10	Carlos Mencia	1 July 2002
71	11	Jimmy Pardo	1 July 2002

=== Season 7 (2003) ===
No. overall	No. in season	Performer	Original release date
72	1	Gabriel Iglesias	6 February 2003
73	2	Bill Burr	13 February 2003
74	3	Bruce Bruce	20 February 2003
75	4	Jackie Kashian	27 February 2003
76	5	Nathaniel Stroman	6 March 2003
77	6	Paul F. Tompkins	13 March 2003
78	7	Carol Leifer	20 March 2003
79	8	Laura Kightlinger	27 March 2003
80	9	Jake Johannsen	3 April 2003
81	10	Patrice O'Neal	10 April 2003
82	11	Otis Lee Crenshaw	17 April 2003
83	12	Freddy Soto	1 May 2003
84	13	Ron White	8 May 2003
85	14	Charlie Viracola	15 May 2003
86	15	Jeff Stilson	22 May 2003
87	16	Sheryl Underwood	29 May 2003
88	17	Dwayne Kennedy	5 June 2003
89	18	Eddie Brill	12 June 2003
90	19	David Feldman	19 June 2003
91	20	Robert Hawkins	3 July 2003
92	21	Joey Kola	10 July 2003
93	22	Jeff Dunham	17 July 2003
94	23	Daniel Tosh	24 July 2003
95	24	Gregg Rogell	31 July 2003
96	25	Wayne Federman	14 August 2003
97	26	Tracy Smith	21 August 2003
98	27	Arnez J.	28 August 2003
99	28	Rich Vos	4 September 2003

=== Season 8 (2004) ===
No. overall	No. in season	Performer	Original release date
100	1	Dat Phan	30 January 2004
101	2	John Heffron	30 January 2004
102	3	D. C. Benny	6 February 2004
103	4	Frank Caliendo	6 February 2004
104	5	Retta	13 February 2004
105	6	Kevin Hart	13 February 2004
106	7	Eddie Gossling	20 February 2004
107	8	Jimmy Shubert	20 February 2004
108	9	Carlos Alazraqui	27 February 2004
109	10	Vanessa Hollingshead	24 February 2004
110	11	Mike Birbiglia	5 March 2004
111	12	Doug Benson	5 March 2004
112	13	Tom Cotter	12 March 2004
113	14	Demetri Martin	19 March 2004
114	15	Bob Oschack	19 March 2004
115	16	Gene Pompa	26 March 2004
116	17	Vince Morris	26 March 2004
117	18	Greg Giraldo	2 April 2004
118	19	Dwayne Perkins	9 April 2004
119	20	Jimmy Dore	9 April 2004
120	21	Clinton Jackson	30 April 2004
121	22	Paul Mecurio	30 April 2004
122	23	Rudy Rush	7 May 2004
123	24	Paul Gilmartin	7 May 2004
124	25	Mathilde "Tig" Notaro	14 May 2004
125	26	Stella	14 May 2004
126	27	Cory Kahaney	28 May 2004
127	28	Scott Kennedy	28 May 2004

=== Season 9 (2004–05) ===
No. overall	No. in season	Performer	Original release date
128	1	Steve McGrew	25 September 2004
129	2	Lizz Winstead	8 October 2004
130	3	Jimmy Carr	14 January 2005
131	4	Godfrey Danchimah	18 February 2005
132	5	Tess	25 February 2005
133	6	Reno Collier	4 March 2005
134	7	Christian Finnegan	11 March 2005
135	8	Jeff Cesario	25 March 2005
136	9	Drew Fraser	1 April 2005
137	10	Russ Meneve	8 April 2005
138	11	Dan Naturman	15 April 2005
139	12	Lynne Koplitz	29 April 2005
140	13	Tom Shillue	6 May 2005
141	14	Todd Lynn	13 May 2005
142	15	Aries Spears	20 May 2005
143	16	Vic Henley	27 May 2005
144	17	Keith Robinson	3 June 2005
145	18	Rocky LaPorte	10 June 2005
146	19	Craig Shoemaker	17 June 2005
147	20	Harland Williams	24 June 2005
148	21	Al Madrigal	1 July 2005
149	22	Alonzo Bodden	8 July 2005
150	23	Henry Phillips	15 July 2005
151	24	Corey Holcomb	22 July 2005

=== Season 10 (2006) ===
No. overall	No. in season	Performer	Original release date
152	1	Rickey Smiley	17 February 2006
153	2	Ty Barnett	17 February 2006
154	3	Antoine DeRay Davis	24 February 2006
155	4	Rod Man	24 February 2006
156	5	Steve Byrne	3 March 2006
157	6	Mike Birbiglia	3 March 2006
158	7	Ted Alexandro	10 March 2006
159	8	Greg Fitzsimmons	17 March 2006
160	9	Megan Mooney	17 March 2006
161	10	Tammy Pescatelli	24 March 2006
162	11	Jon Reep	26 March 2006
163	12	Todd Barry	31 March 2006
164	13	Arj Barker	31 March 2006
165	14	Nick Swardson	7 April 2006
166	15	John Caparulo	7 April 2006
167	16	Andy Kindler	14 April 2006
168	17	Patrick Dixon	14 April 2006
169	18	Brian Kiley	21 April 2006
170	19	Ben Bailey	21 April 2006
171	20	Peter Berman	28 April 2006
172	21	Becky Pedigo	28 April 2006
173	22	Bill Santiago	8 July 2006
174	23	Jeff Garcia	5 May 2006
175	24	Kyle Cease	5 May 2006

=== Season 11 (2007) ===
No. overall	No. in season	Performer	Original release date
176	1	Marc Maron	12 January 2007
177	2	John Heffron	12 January 2007
178	3	Andrew Kennedy	19 January 2007
179	4	Nick DiPaolo	19 January 2007
180	5	Dov Davidoff	26 January 2007
181	6	Kyle Grooms	26 January 2007
182	7	Bob Marley	2 February 2007
183	8	Lisa Landry	2 February 2007
184	9	Tom Papa	16 February 2007
185	10	Maria Bamford	16 February 2007
186	11	Finesse Mitchell	23 February 2007
187	12	Loni Love	23 February 2007
188	13	Chelsea Handler	9 March 2007
189	14	Deon Cole	9 March 2007
190	15	Paul F. Tompkins	16 March 2007
191	16	Kyle Dunnigan	16 March 2007
192	17	Ian Bagg	30 March 2007
193	18	Josh Sneed	30 March 2007
194	19	Mitch Fatel	6 April 2007
195	20	Howard Kremer	6 April 2007

=== Season 12 (2008) ===
No. overall	No. in season	Performer	Original release date
196	1	Stephen Lynch	11 January 2008
197	2	Dan Cummins	11 January 2008
198	3	Jo Koy	18 January 2008
199	4	Sebastian Maniscalco	18 January 2008
200	5	Hard 'n Phirm	25 January 2008
201	6	Leo Allen	25 January 2008
202	7	Eugene Mirman	1 February 2008
203	8	Jordan Rubin	1 February 2008
204	9	"My First Time" (special)	8 February 2008
205	10	Nick Thune	8 February 2008
206	11	Bonnie McFarlane	15 February 2008
207	12	Rich Vos	15 February 2008
208	13	Lavell Crawford	22 February 2008
209	14	Joe Matarese	29 February 2008
210	15	Big Jay Oakerson	29 February 2008
211	16	Juston McKinney	14 March 2008
212	17	Nick Griffin	14 March 2008
213	18	Chad Daniels	21 March 2008
214	19	Kirk Fox	21 March 2008
215	20	Dan Mintz	28 March 2008
216	21	Brian Posehn	28 March 2008
217	22	Robert Kelly	4 April 2008
218	23	Billy Gardell	4 April 2008
219	24	Shaun Majumder	11 April 2008

=== Season 13 (2009) ===
No. overall	No. in season	Performer	Original release date
220	1	Kurt Metzger	9 January 2009
221	2	Doug Benson	9 January 2009
222	3	Anthony Jeselnik	16 January 2009
223	4	Brian Scolaro	16 January 2009
224	5	Jasper Redd	23 January 2009
225	6	Rob Stapleton	23 January 2009
226	7	Tommy Johnagin	30 January 2009
227	8	Jamie Lissow	30 January 2009
228	9	Dan Levy	6 February 2009
229	10	Joe DeRosa	6 February 2009
230	11	Pete Lee	13 February 2009
231	12	Rebecca Corry	13 February 2009
232	13	Greer Barnes	20 February 2009
233	14	Red Grant	20 February 2009
234	15	Eddie Ifft	27 February 2009
235	16	Chris Porter	27 February 2009
236	17	Jimmy Carr	6 March 2009
237	18	Erin Foley	6 March 2009
238	19	Greg Warren	13 March 2009
239	20	Tom Rhodes	13 March 2009
240	21	Josh Blue	27 March 2009
241	22	Bo Burnham	27 March 2009
242	23	John Mulaney	3 April 2009
243	24	Kristen Schaal	3 April 2009

=== Season 14 (2010) ===
No. overall	No. in season	Performer	Original release date
244	1	Tony Rock	19 February 2010
245	2	Doug Williams	19 February 2010
246	3	Owen Benjamin	26 February 2010
247	4	Pete Holmes	26 February 2010
248	5	Rob Riggle	5 March 2010
249	6	Jon Lajoie	5 March 2010
250	7	Julian McCullough	12 March 2010
251	8	Shane Mauss	12 March 2010
252	9	Donald Glover	19 March 2010
253	10	Jon Dore	19 March 2010
254	11	Rachel Feinstein	26 March 2010
255	12	The Sklar Brothers	26 March 2010
256	13	Rory Albanese	2 April 2010
257	14	Amy Schumer	2 April 2010
258	15	Matt Braunger	9 April 2010
259	16	Mo Mandel	9 April 2010
260	17	Bret Ernst	16 April 2010
261	18	Iliza Shlesinger	16 April 2010
262	19	Eliot Chang	23 April 2010
263	20	Mike DeStefano	23 April 2010
264	21	Ryan Stout	30 April 2010
265	22	Myq Kaplan	30 April 2010
266	23	Andy Kindler	7 May 2010
267	24	Jeff Dye	7 May 2010

=== Season 15 (2011) ===
No. overall	No. in season	Performer	Original release date
268	1	Tom Segura	21 January 2011
269	2	Michael Kosta	21 January 2011
270	3	Sheng Wang	28 January 2011
271	4	Chelsea Peretti	28 January 2011
272	5	Chris D'Elia	4 February 2011
273	6	Nate Bargatze	4 February 2011
274	7	Hari Kondabolu	11 February 2011
275	8	Jack Whitehall	11 February 2011
276	9	Al Jackson	18 February 2011
277	10	Kyle Kinane	25 February 2011
278	11	Matt Fulchiron	25 February 2011
279	12	Mike Vecchione	4 March 2011
280	13	Jessi Klein	4 March 2011
281	14	Louis Katz	11 March 2011
282	15	Jay Larson	11 March 2011
283	16	Natasha Leggero	25 March 2011
