= Last Comic Standing season 4 =

On May 30, 2006, competitive reality show Last Comic Standing began airing its fourth season on NBC with a two-hour special and a new host, Anthony Clark.

== Auditions ==
In the opening rounds, Buck Star once again showed up to audition in each city only to be turned down repeatedly. As in season two, he was finally allowed to perform in the last city, where he didn't impress the audience and was cut.

Numerous established comedians auditioned for Last Comic Standing this season. They included:

- Doug Benson (Best Week Ever)
- Marc Price (Family Ties)
- Larry Reeb (Bob & Tom Show)
- Jimmy Pardo
- Nikki Payne (Muchmusic's Video On Trial and Comedy Network's Buzz)
- Kyle Cease (Comedy Central Presents)
- Tig Notaro (Comedy Central Presents)

Some of the finalists have also appeared elsewhere:

- Gabriel "Fluffy" Iglesias (All That, Comedy Central Presents various stand-up specials)
- Bil Dwyer (BattleBots, I've Got a Secret, Extreme Dodgeball)
- Josh Blue (Mind of Mencia, America's Got Talent)

== Last Comic Downloaded ==
In a new web tie-in this season, NBC allowed viewers to vote online to give two comics a chance to perform on the live finale in a head-to-head competition. Each week, five comedians were featured online. The competitors were narrowed down to the two finalists in later rounds.

Week	Winning Comic	Catch phrase
Week 1	Kaitlin Colombo	Ever wonder what kind of comedy a gay man's 19-year-old daughter would perform?
Week 2	Willy Parsons	Don't worry, he's only been in jail once.
Week 3	Nikki Payne	Duct-taping her problems away.
Week 4	Josh Wolf	Your guide to dispelling marital myths.
Week 5	Theo Von	His father was 70 when he was born.

== Season 4 Results ==
Elimination Chart
Comics	Head-to-head			Public elimination			
Comics	Ep 5	Ep 6	Ep 7	Ep 8	Ep 9	Ep 10	Ep 11
Josh Blue	IN	IN	IN	IN	IN	IN	LCS
Ty Barnett	IN	IN	WIN	IN	IN	IN	OUT
Chris Porter	SAFE	WIN	IN	IN	LOW	OUT	
Michele Balan	WIN	WIN	IN	LOW	OUT		
Roz	SAFE	IN	IN	OUT			
Rebecca Corry	IN	SAFE	OUT				
Kristin Key	IN	IN	OUT				
Gabriel Iglesias	IN	IN	DQ				
Bil Dwyer	IN	OUT					
Joey Gay	IN	OUT					
April Macie	OUT						
Stella Stopler	OUT						

LCS means the comic was the last comic standing
SAFE means the comic won the immunity challenge
WIN means the comic participated and won the head-to-head showdown
LOW means the comic was shown as receiving the second-lowest viewer vote total
OUT means the comic lost in the head-to-head showdown or by viewer voting and was eliminated
DQ means the comic was disqualified for breaking the show's rules

== Episode guide ==
=== Episodes 1-4 ===
Episodes 1-4 consisted of the early auditions and the selection of the finalists.

=== Episode 5 ===
The contestants moved into the Queen Mary Hotel where they would stay for the remainder of the competition.

==== Immunity challenge: Heckling ====
The contestants were paired up. One performed on stage while the other sat in the audience heckling them about their jokes. They then switched roles. The best heckler and the best performer would be rewarded with immunity. Contestant Joey Gay didn't heckle fellow comic April Macie at all, saying it was common courtesy. The winner for performing was Chris Porter, and the winner for heckling was Roz.

The pairs for this challenge were:

- Chris Porter and Josh Blue
- Kristin Key and Michele Balan
- Bil Dwyer and Gabriel Iglesias
- Ty Barnett and Stella Stopler
- Rebecca Corry and Roz
- Joey Gay and April Macie

==== Head to Head ====
Stella and Michele tied in vote count. They were allowed to discuss whom they should face in the head to head. They chose April Macie. After the performances, Michele Balan received 83% of the vote, eliminating Stella and April from the competition.

=== Episode 6 ===
==== Immunity challenge: Magazine topic ====
The comics were awakened at 3 a.m. to drive in their minibus to Adam Carolla's radio show. They each randomly selected an envelope with a magazine inside. Adam then informed them that they would do a one-minute improv routine on the subject of their magazine on his morning radio show. Some of the magazines were Weapons of Death, Modern Knitting, Farming Journal, and Latina Wedding. Rebecca Corry won the challenge for her routine about Beefcake magazine. She was rewarded with immunity, which she referred to as immunization.

==== Head to Head ====
This episode's head to head voting was the first four-way tie on Last Comic Standing. The tie was between Joey Gay, Michele Balan, Bil Dwyer, and Chris Porter. Each of them was forced to perform after receiving two votes (one of Porter's votes was from Gabriel Iglesias, whose strategy is to pick names out of a hat). Kristin Key and Iglesias received one vote each.

Because there were four comedians in the head to head, two would go home and two would stay. After the four comedians performed and the audience voted for their favorite, it was revealed that Bil Dwyer got the lowest percentage of the votes. Chris Porter won the Capital One Audience Pick, with the highest percentage of the votes. Joey Gay was also eliminated, and Michele Balan survived her second head to head in a row to stay in the competition.

=== Episode 7 ===
==== Challenge: Roast ====
The contestants each got to vote on which comic to roast at the Friars Club of Beverly Hills. Gabriel Iglesias received the most votes. The judges at the roast were Gilbert Gottfried, Phyllis Diller, and the winner of Last Comic Standing Season 3, Alonzo Bodden. At the roast, Kristen Key was arguably the worst, with her jokes about Gabriel getting complete silence. Chris Porter won the challenge, but did not receive immunity because that would have automatically put him into the final five. He instead was rewarded with a one-year membership to the Friars of Beverly Hills.

==== Post-challenge drama ====
After the challenge, a producer caught Gabriel Iglesias using a BlackBerry, a violation of house rules, according to the contract all contestants had signed. Producer Peter Engel dismissed Gabriel from the show, even though Gabriel claimed to have only been using it to contact his friends and family. At the Montreal Comedy Festival, he claimed his girlfriend had just gone through breast augmentation surgery, and he was feeling concerned about her recovery, insecure about being away from her, and without contact for such an extended period of time. In addition, he claimed the producers caught him with the phone much earlier (at least a few days) than what was portrayed on the show, and that they wanted to keep him around for the "roast" round/part of the show because he would be an easy target for fat jokes. With their reasoning being that that would make that episode a lot funnier, which included many jokes at his expense, he was then kicked off the show.

==== Head to Head ====
Rebecca Corry, Ty Barnett, and Kristen Key were chosen to compete in the head to head after having each received two votes. After their performances in the Last Comic Theatre, it was revealed that Corry received the fewest votes and would be eliminated from the competition. Key received the second-fewest votes and was also eliminated. With 69 percent of the votes, Barnett became the final person in the final five comics along with remaining comedians Josh Blue, Roz, Chris Porter, and Michele Balan.

=== Episode 8 ===
The final five performed in front of a live audience for five minutes each. After all five had performed, the phone lines opened to let home viewers vote for their favorite comic. The one with the fewest votes would be eliminated. Each comic had a short bio before their performance. After the phone lines opened, the current lowest two vote-getters, Roz and Josh Blue, were displayed on the screen, albeit to only half of the audience.

=== Episode 9 ===
Gary Gulman from season two performed. Michele Balan and Roz were announced as the bottom two from last week, then Roz was eliminated. The remaining contestants performed another stand-up routine for five minutes. After the phone lines opened, Anthony Clark explained that on the previous week's show, there were some problems that resulted in half the country not seeing who were the bottom two. There were no technical difficulties this time, as the screen showed that Michele Balan and Chris Porter were in the bottom two so far.

=== Episode 10 ===
Michele received the fewest votes and was subsequently the first of the final four to leave the competition. Jay London from seasons two and three appeared on stage and gave a performance. Next, Caroline Rhea, host of NBC's The Biggest Loser performed. Then, Josh, Chris, and Ty performed their acts, but early results were not shown to the audience.

=== Episode 11 ===
Josh Wolf and Theo Von performed their acts in trying to become the "Last Comic Downloaded." Next, Paul Rodriguez made a guest performance. Afterward, Chris Porter was eliminated from the competition as he received the fewest votes. Josh and Ty performed their acts in anticipation of the following week's final episode.

=== Episode 12 ===
Theo Von won the majority of votes to become the "Last Comic Downloaded." Previous Last Comic Standing winners Dat Phan, John Heffron, and Alonzo Bodden performed next. The host of the past seasons of Last Comic Standing, Jay Mohr, also made an appearance. The remaining finalists, Ty Barnett and Josh Blue, performed their acts for the audience one last time, and at the end of the show Josh Blue was declared the winner of Last Comic Standing season 4.
