= Dan Naturman =

American stand-up comedian

- Born: October 20, 1969 (age 56)
- Education: University of Pennsylvania; Fordham University

Dan Naturman (born October 20, 1969) is an American stand-up comedian, who has made numerous appearances on television. His performing style of grouchiness and self-deprecation accompanies his comic content about modern topics such as Internet dating and terrorism. He has appeared on the television series Last Comic Standing and America's Got Talent.

== Early life ==
Naturman graduated from the University of Pennsylvania and the Fordham University School of Law.

== Stand-Up Comedy ==
Naturman has appeared on Late Show with David Letterman and Late Night with Conan O'Brien, as well as his own Comedy Central Presents special.

In 2004 Naturman was a contestant on Last Comic Standing where he was the favorite of celebrity judges Drew Carey and Brett Butler, but he was not selected as one of the final 10 contestants. In 2008, he returned as a contestant where he advanced to the New York City showcase of season 6, and won a ticket to the semi-finals. In 2014, he was a contestant on America's Got Talent and was eliminated in the semi-final round.

== TV Appearances ==
His television appearances include:

- Bedford Springs as Hardware Store Clerk (2002)
- Tough Crowd with Colin Quinn (2003)
- Noise as Nervous Young Man (2004)
- Last Call with Carson Daly (2004)
- Jimmy Kimmel Live! (2004 and 2006)
- Last Comic Standing (2004 and 2008)
- Comedy Central Presents (2005)
- Late Night with Conan O'Brien (2005 and 2007)
- The Late Late Show with Craig Ferguson (2006 and 2007)
- The Tonight Show with Conan O'Brien (2009)
- America's Got Talent (2014)
- Crashing (2017-19)
