= Better Late Than Never (TV series) =

American reality-travel show

- Genre: Reality; Alternative comedy; Travel show
- Based on: Grandpas Over Flowers by Na Young-seok
- Written by: Paul Greenberg; John Kennedy; Carol Leifer
- Directed by: Troy Miller
- Starring: William Shatner; Henry Winkler; George Foreman; Terry Bradshaw; Jeff Dye
- Country of origin: United States
- Original language: English
- No. of seasons: 2
- No. of episodes: 12

Production
- Executive producers: Henry Winkler; Jason Ehrlich; Tim Crescenti; Craig Zadan; Neil Meron; Stephanie Chambers; Alex Katz D. J. Lee
- Production locations: Tokyo, Kyoto, Seoul, Hong Kong, Phuket, Chiang Mai
- Running time: 43–45 minutes
- Production companies: Storyline Entertainment; CJ E&M; Small World International Format Television; Universal Television Alternative Studio

Original release
- Network: NBC
- Release: August 23, 2016 – February 5, 2018

Related
- Grandpas Over Flowers, South Korea

Better Late Than Never is an American reality travel show which aired on NBC and was produced by Universal Television (under its Universal Television Alternative name), in association with Storyline Entertainment. The series is an adaptation of the South Korean Grandpas Over Flowers series. The cast includes four "seasoned" North American celebrities William Shatner, Henry Winkler, George Foreman, and Terry Bradshaw, accompanied by younger comedian Jeff Dye, as they travel overseas, experiencing new cultures and checking off their bucket lists. The series started productions in August 2015 and premiered August 23, 2016.

On September 22, 2016, NBC renewed the series for a second season, set in various European countries, which premiered on January 1, 2018. A special preview aired on December 11, 2017. On July 16, 2018, the series was canceled after two seasons.

== Production ==
In late 2014, NBC bought the remake rights for the South Korean series Grandpas Over Flowers from CJ E&M. The original show was one of the first successful programs for cable tvN and had two spin-off shows. It premiered in 2013, reached a high local rating of 12.5 percent, and became popular in other Asian countries, with the combination of veteran actors in their seventies and a popular young actor attracting a wide demographic range of viewers for a reality show.

The show was produced by cast member Winkler, along with Jason Ehrlich, producer of The Bachelor and The Bachelorette, Tim Crescenti, of I Survived a Japanese Game Show and Storyline Entertainment's two producers Craig Zadan and Neil Meron, of The Bucket List.

Plans for the series were announced in June 2015. Productions started in Japan in August, and on August 12, 2015, the cast was interviewed by comedian Bibiru Ōki on Japan's Nippon TV talk show PON!, and filmed for the NBC show with the Japanese cast. Also in August, the cast visited South Korea, arriving in Seoul on August 20 for a three-day trip, including a visit to COEX for filming with cameo guests, K-pop girl group Girls' Generation, and trips to Hwaseong Fortress, Caribbean Bay, Itaewon, and the Korean Demilitarized Zone.

Japan, including Tokyo and Kyoto, was the first stop for the show, with more trips to include Seoul, Hong Kong, Phuket and Chiang Mai.

According to NBC, the five cast members would rely on each other for support and encouragement and demonstrate that friendship is the ultimate gift. While filming the show in Southeast Asia, Shatner, at age 84, became interested in Buddhism and meditation after spending time with a Buddhist monk. He said, "The disaster of death is encroaching so I'm more and more aware of how beautiful it is to be alive."

== Cast ==
The cast included actor, producer, writer and director Henry Winkler, best known for his character The Fonz from the series Happy Days; actor, director and writer William Shatner who starred as, among other roles, Capt. James T. Kirk in Star Trek; four-time Super Bowl-winning quarterback and current football broadcaster Terry Bradshaw; and former heavyweight boxing champion George Foreman. Like the original show, the older cast was accompanied by a younger cast member, comedian Jeff Dye, from NBC's Last Comic Standing, who took on the equivalent role as Lee Seo-jin's, as "bag carrier and human navigator."

- William Shatner
- Henry Winkler
- George Foreman
- Terry Bradshaw
- Jeff Dye

== Episodes ==
Season	Episodes	Originally released	
Season	Episodes	First released	Last released
1	4	August 23, 2016	September 13, 2016
2	8	December 11, 2017	February 5, 2018

=== Season 1 (2016): Asia ===
No. overall	No. in season	Title	Original release date	Prod. code	U.S. viewers (millions)
1	1	"Welcome to Tokyo"	August 23, 2016	101	7.35
2	2	"Kyoto and Hong Kong: Less Talky, More Sake"	August 30, 2016	102	7.33
3	3	"Seoul Brothers"	September 6, 2016	103	6.91
4	4	"A Thai Goodbye"	September 13, 2016	104	7.64

=== Season 2 (2017–18): Europe ===
No. overall	No. in season	Title	Original release date	Prod. code	U.S. viewers (millions)
5	1	"Munich"	December 11, 2017	201	5.47
6	2	"Sweden: I'm a Viking!"	January 1, 2018	202	4.31
7	3	"Lithuania: I'm King of the Castle!"	January 1, 2018	203	4.10
8	4	"Berlin: How Do You Say Roots in German?"	January 8, 2018	204	4.14
9	5	"Barcelona: If Terry's Not Naked, Who Is?"	January 15, 2018	205	5.53
10	6	"Madrid: Matador Training"	January 22, 2018	206	4.92
11	7	"Moroccan Wishes and Camel Dreams"	January 29, 2018	207	4.78
12	8	"To the Sahara and Back"	February 5, 2018	208	5.31

== Reception and impact ==
This is the first time a South Korean local variety program was adapted by a North American national broadcast network. During production time, the show's sponsors, Korea Tourism Organization, anticipated the advertising effect of the airing of the Korea episode on NBC prime time to amount to as much as 11 billion won ($9.2 million dollars).
