= Claudia Cogan =

American comedian

Claudia Cogan is an American stand-up comic. She has been nominated three times for an Excellence in Comedy in New York (ECNY) award. She is an Upright Citizen's Brigade Theatre alum, having been on the Harold team, Pole Position.

== Career ==
Cogan began doing stand-up in 2005. In 2009, New York Magazine listed Cogan as "Ten People Funny People Find Funny." She named Sandra Bernhard and David Letterman as idols. They cited this as her signature joke: "Until the financial crisis, I thought a 401(k) was an unusually long marathon. I couldn't understand why my co-workers kept signing up. To me, it was just a way to mess up a Sunday." That same year, she began co-hosting "50 First Jokes" with Jiwon Lee and John F. O'Donnell. In 2010, Cogan was a contestant on the 7th season of Last Comic Standing.

In 2017, Cogan did a strand-up set on SeeSo's Night Train With Wyatt Cenac.

Cogan has appeared at comedy festivals like the Bridgetown Comedy Festival, San Francisco SketchFest, the Eugene Mirman Comedy Festival.

== Personal ==
Cogan identifies as lesbian and uses she/hers pronouns.

== External sources ==
- Official website
