= D. C. Benny =

American comedian

D. C. Benny, born Ben Wartofsky, is an American stand-up comedian. Wartofsky was born in Washington, D.C., and lives and works in New York.

== Career ==
Wartofsky has performed on Comedy Central Presents. He has performed at comedy clubs in New York City and Los Angeles.

Benny teamed up with the production company Edithead and shot a trailer for “Justice Patrol”, an animated cop show about a cowboy and an Islamic fundamentalist fighting crime in New York. This led to another development deal with MTV, where Benny wrote an animated pilot for the rapper Eminem as well as creating the shows "Chop-up Video", "A Day In The...” and "Scared Shitless."

=== Comedy ===
Benny has been working as a New York-based comedy writer/performer/producer for over 15 years. Benny started in the New York comedy scene when he was hired to write and perform in two commercial campaigns for Comedy Central. These spots led to two network development deals. One with ABC and then a second deal with NBC in which the network commissioned Benny to create the pilot People Who Live in My Building, a show where he played the whole cast of characters. NBC then hired Benny to produce a variety of man-on-the-street and in-studio segments for Friday Night Videos.

Benny performs standup nightly and has had his writing published in Cracked magazine, Jest, The Comical, The Comic Bible, Girlcomic.net and Green Magazine. He has opened for Gilbert Gottfried, David Alan Grier, Bernie Mac, Kevin Pollak, Margaret Cho, Jeff Foxworthy, Tommy Davidson, and many others. During the week he works as a producer and sketch writer for Sirius Radio's show Jim Breuer Unleashed, second in ratings only to Howard Stern.

Benny was a Top Ten finalist in the eighth season of NBC's Last Comic Standing, but was eliminated from the show after losing a head-to-head showdown with fellow finalist Lachlan Patterson in the eighth episode of the season. Benny finished in eighth place.

=== Acting ===
Benny has appeared in commercial campaigns for Volkswagen, Dell, Levi's (directed by Doug Liman), Martini and Rossi, and Budweiser, for which he wrote two specs, as well as a spot for the Enron corporation that he co-wrote with and which was directed by Tony Kay. He has also appeared in a commercial for AIG.

After a performance at HBO's Aspen Comedy Festival, Benny was offered a job writing for The Dennis Miller Show, which led to another job writing on the MTV Video Music Awards, as well as several segments for VH1’s I Love the '80s. Since then, Benny has written spec scripts for HBO’s Curb Your Enthusiasm, The Bernie Mac Show, as well as spec sketches for Conan O'Brien, Keenen Ivory Wayans, Martin Short and Chappelle's Show.

Benny met producer Jason Sokoloff in 2003, and since then they have worked on a lot of different projects together; “Brooklyn Zoo”, an animated show about a group of blue collar superheroes, “In My Head”, a pilot presentation with producers Edithead that won first prize at the Montreal Comedy Festivals “Just For Pitching” event, as well as the pilot presentations “Who Knew”, “The Manhattan Comedy Festival” and the comedy concert film, “Hebrew Homeboys”, which has been billed as a “Kosher Kings Of Comedy”.

In October 2006, Benny began playing the recurring character of Chaz Dargote on As the World Turns until 2007.
