= Last Comic Standing =

American reality television talent show

- Genre: Talent contest
- Presented by: Jay Mohr; Anthony Clark; Bill Bellamy; Fearne Cotton; Craig Robinson; J. B. Smoove; Anthony Jeselnik
- Country of origin: United States
- Original language: English
- No. of seasons: 9
- No. of episodes: 76

Production
- Executive producers: Wanda Sykes; Page Hurwitz; Javier Winnik; Peter Engel; Dan Cutforth; Jane Lipsitz
- Camera setup: Multi-camera
- Running time: 42 minutes
- Production companies: Peter Engel Productions; Giraffe Productions; Magical Elves; Push It Productions; NBC Studios (2003–04); NBC Universal Television Studio (2004–07); Universal Media Studios (2007–10); Universal Television (2014–15)

Original release
- Network: NBC
- Release: June 1, 2003 – September 9, 2015

Last Comic Standing is an American reality television talent competition show on NBC that aired from June 1, 2003, to August 9, 2010, and again in 2014 and 2015. Each season a comedian from an initially large group of hopefuls was picked as a winner. For the first seven seasons, the winner received a cash prize and a television special; for season eight in 2014, the winner won a cash prize, a talent deal with NBC, and a half-hour scripted project developed by Universal Television.

== Format ==
The show varied its format season by season. For seasons 1–2 and 4–7, NBC talent scouts Ross Mark and Bob Read held open casting calls in various locations around the United States. At each casting call, Mark and Read selected comics to participate in callback auditions in front of live audiences. Mark and Read selected a predetermined number of comics from each callback, who were invited to participate in a semifinal qualifying round.

The comics who advanced to the semifinal qualifying round were divided into two groups. In Season Four, 40 comics were divided into two groups of 20; the comics performed competing against each other at the Alex Theatre in Glendale, California. During the semifinal qualifying rounds, a panel of celebrity judges, and the show's producers, selected the finalists who would move forward to the final qualifying round, and live together in a group residence.

Once the residence finalists were selected, the comics participated in some type of comedic challenge each television week. Challenges included performing stand-up at a local laundromat, working as a tour guide in Los Angeles, participating in a roast at the Friars Club of Beverly Hills, and performing comedy related to a specific subject with little preparation time on a radio show. Usually the winner of each challenge is rewarded with immunity from being eliminated from the competition for that week; the remaining comics are vulnerable to elimination during a "head-to-head" standup challenge.

As the conclusion of each television week drew near, each comic selected one other comic whom they believed they could defeat in a head-to-head challenge. The comics were sent off individually to a secluded booth, and named the person selected using the phrase "I know I'm funnier than _____." The comic who received the most nominations participated in that evening's head-to-head competition, and selected their opponent from any of the comics who had challenged them.

The head-to-head competition occurs in front of a live studio audience. For the first seven seasons, the studio audience voted electronically for their preferred performer, while in the eighth season the judges always selected the winner. The winning comic remains "in the house", while the losing comic is eliminated from the competition.

For the first seven seasons, when only five comics remained, the format changed again. All remaining comics performed for a large theatre audience as before, but now the decision-making power shifted from the studio audience to the television audience. Viewers cast their votes for their favorite comic by calling a specific number, by voting online at the network's website, or both. Unlike some other "audience-vote reality" programs, the producers imposed a maximum number of eligible votes per originating phone number and email address. The comic receiving the lowest number of votes each week was eliminated from the competition, until there was only the "Last Comic Standing".

The "in the house" concept was dropped for season 7, and each week consisted of all remaining comics performing in front of a theater audience and being voted on by the television viewers to determine who leaves and who remains. It was essentially identical to the "final five" format used previously.

The third season was also unique in that it pitted the contestants of the first two seasons against one another.

== Seasons ==
=== Season 1 (2003) ===
Season one aired in the summer of 2003 and was hosted by Jay Mohr. The winner of the audience-participation final vote in season one was Dat Phan, with 35% of the vote. Other finalists included Ralphie May (28%), Rich Vos (18%), Cory Kahaney (12%), and Tess (7%). Contestants "in the house" who did not make the final five were Geoff Brown, Tere Joyce, Sean Kent, Dave Mordal, and Rob Cantrell.

Elimination chart
Comics	Head-to-head					Public elimination	
Comics	Ep 4	Ep 5	Ep 6	Ep 7	Ep 8	Ep 10	Ep 11
Dat Phan	IN	IN	SAFE	WIN	WIN	IN	LCS
Ralphie May	IN	IN	WIN	IN	IN	IN	OUT
Rich Vos	IN	IN	IN	IN	IN	OUT	
Cory Kahaney	IN	WIN	IN	SAFE	IN	OUT	
Tess	SAFE	SAFE	IN	IN	IN	OUT	
Geoff Brown	IN	IN	IN	IN	OUT		
Dave Mordal	WIN	IN	IN	IN	OUT		
Rob Cantrell	IN	IN	OUT				
Tere Joyce	IN	OUT					
Sean Kent	OUT						

LCS means the comic was the last comic standing
SAFE means the comic won the immunity challenge
WIN means the comic participated in and won a head-to-head showdown
OUT means the comic was the runner-up
OUT means the comic lost a head-to-head showdown or viewer vote, and was eliminated

=== Season 2 (2004) ===
Season two aired in the summer of 2004, hosted by Jay Mohr. The Last Comic Standing was John Heffron. Alonzo Bodden was the first runner-up, while third place went to Gary Gulman. The other finalists were Ant, Tammy Pescatelli, Bonnie McFarlane, Jay London, Kathleen Madigan, Todd Glass, and Corey Holcomb.

Buck Star, who became infamous for appearing at every LCS audition, first appeared in season two. After being repeatedly rejected by talent scouts Mark and Read, Mark acquiesced, allowing Buck to perform in the callback auditions in Tampa, Florida (the final audition site of the season). Buck failed to impress the live audience, however, and did not advance further in the competition.

After five head-to-head eliminations, a wildcard competition was set up among the five eliminated comics the top voter-getting returning to the competition. Jay London won this competition, but was ultimately eliminated again in the next vote.

Elimination chart
Comics	Head-to-head					Wild card	Public elimination	
Comics	Ep 5	Ep 6	Ep 7	Ep 8	Ep 9	Ep 11	Ep 13	Ep 15
John Heffron	WIN	IN	IN	IN	WIN	IN	IN	LCS
Alonzo Bodden	IN	IN	SAFE	IN	WIN	IN	IN	OUT
Gary Gulman	IN	IN	WIN	WIN	IN	IN	IN	OUT
Jay London	IN	IN	IN	OUT		WIN	OUT	
Kathleen Madigan	IN	IN	IN	SAFE	IN	IN	OUT	
Tammy Pescatelli	IN	WIN	IN	IN	SAFE	IN	OUT	
Corey Holcomb	SAFE	IN	IN	IN	OUT	OUT		
Ant	IN	SAFE	OUT			OUT		
Todd Glass	IN	OUT				OUT		
Bonnie McFarlane	OUT					OUT		

LCS means the comic was the last comic standing
SAFE means the comic won the immunity challenge
WIN means the comic participated in and won a head-to-head showdown
WIN means the comic won the wildcard and returned to the show
OUT means the comic lost a head-to-head showdown or viewer vote, and was eliminated
OUT means the comic competed for the wildcard and lost

=== Season 3 (2004) ===
While Season 2 was still airing, NBC agreed to produce a third season, which would air during the fall of 2004. Season three, dubbed the "Battle of the Best", consisted of a competition between the final ten comedians from seasons one and two. The grand prize awarded for the season was only $250,000 (unlike previous seasons' prizes which included a talent contract and a television special). Alonzo Bodden, the runner-up from Season 2, was the winner and Dave Mordal, the seventh place man from Season 1, was the runner-up. The third place men were John Heffron, the Season 2 winner and Rich Vos, the third place man from Season 1. Season 2's first-eliminated Bonnie McFarlane (whom Vos would marry the following year) chose not to participate in this season for unspecified reasons, leaving the other Season 2 comedians to select her replacement from among four comics who made it to that season's Las Vegas finals round; their near-unanimous choice was Jessica Kirson. Celebrities appearing in the season were Jeffrey Ross, Triumph the Insult Comic Dog, Louie Anderson and Carrot Top. Episodes were 1 hour and the finale was a half-hour long.

Elimination chart
Comics	Ep 2	Ep 3	Ep 4	Ep 5	Ep 6	Ep 7	Finale
Alonzo Bodden	WIN		WIN			WIN	LCS
Dave Mordal	IN			IN	IN		OUT
John Heffron	WIN			WIN	WIN		OUT
Rich Vos	IN		IN			IN	OUT
Gary Gulman		WIN	WIN			OUT	
Tess	IN		IN			OUT	
Todd Glass	WIN			WIN		OUT	
Geoff Brown		IN		IN		OUT	
Jay London		WIN	WIN		OUT		
Ralphie May	IN		IN		OUT		
Kathleen Madigan		WIN		WIN	OUT		
Dat Phan		IN		IN	OUT		
Ant		WIN		OUT			
Sean Kent		IN		OUT			
Tammy Pescatelli	WIN		OUT				
Rob Cantrell		IN	OUT				
Corey Holcomb		OUT					
Tere Joyce		OUT					
Jessica Kirson	OUT						
Cory Kahaney	OUT						

Season 1 comic
Season 2 comic

LCS means the comic was the last comic standing
OUT means the comic was the runner-up
WIN means the comic's team won the $50,000 viewer vote and the comic moved on in the competition
IN means the comic's team lost the $50,000 viewer vote and the comic moved on in the competition
OUT means the comic's team won the $50,000 viewer vote, but the comic was eliminated
OUT means the comic's team lost the $50,000 viewer vote and the comic was eliminated.

==== Cancellation ====
Due to lackluster ratings in the third season (falling as low as 74th in the primetime Nielsen ratings), NBC canceled the show before the last episode aired; it aired on Comedy Central instead.

=== Season 4 (2006) ===
On May 30, 2006, the show returned to NBC with a two-hour special and a new host, Anthony Clark.

Nielsen ratings from Season 4 averaged a 4.4 share (4,848,800 households).

Josh Blue, a St. Paul, Minnesota native who has cerebral palsy, was the Last Comic Standing on the August 9, 2006, conclusion of the contest. Ty Barnett was the runner-up, while third place went to Chris Porter. Other finalists were (in order of placement) Michele Balan, Roz, Kristin Key, Rebecca Corry, Gabriel Iglesias, Joey Gay, Bil Dwyer, April Macie, and Stella Stolper. Additionally, Theo Von won the separate online contest to be the Last Comic Downloaded. Iglesias was disqualified for multiple violations of his contract including using a BlackBerry and became the first in the history of the show to be thrown out of the competition.

Elimination chart
Comics	Head-to-head			Public elimination			
Comics	Ep 5	Ep 6	Ep 7	Ep 8	Ep 9	Ep 10	Ep 11
Josh Blue	IN	IN	IN	IN	IN	IN	LCS
Ty Barnett	IN	IN	WIN	IN	IN	IN	OUT
Chris Porter	SAFE	WIN	IN	IN	LOW	OUT	
Michele Balan	WIN	WIN	IN	LOW	OUT		
Roz	SAFE	IN	IN	OUT			
Rebecca Corry	IN	SAFE	OUT				
Kristin Key	IN	IN	OUT				
Gabriel Iglesias	IN	IN	DQ				
Joey Gay	IN	OUT					
Bil Dwyer	IN	OUT					
April Macie	OUT						
Stella Stolper	OUT						

LCS means the comic was the last comic standing
SAFE means the comic won the immunity challenge
WIN means the comic participated in and won a head-to-head showdown
LOW means the comic was shown as receiving the second-lowest viewer vote total
OUT means the comic lost in a head-to-head showdown or viewer vote, and was eliminated
DQ means the comic was disqualified for breaking the show's rules

=== Season 5 (2007) ===
Last Comic Standing returned for a fifth season in the summer of 2007. Comedian Bill Bellamy hosted the show. The winner received $250,000 along with an NBC Universal contract and a Bravo special. Unlike previous versions the season featured comics from around the world competing alongside Americans. Auditions were held in London, Montreal, Sydney, Los Angeles, New York, Minneapolis, San Antonio and Tempe. The fifth season began June 13. This series premiered on British music channel TMF on July 4, 2007.

The final ten comics were Lavell Crawford, Jon Reep, Gerry Dee, Amy Schumer, Ralph Harris, Doug Benson, Matt Kirshen, Debra DiGiovanni, Dante, and Gina Yashere.

The season finale aired on September 19, 2007; Jon Reep was revealed as the winner. Lavell Crawford was the runner-up.

Elimination chart
Comics	Head-to-head			Public elimination			
Comics	Ep 7	Ep 8	Ep 9	Ep 10	Ep 11	Ep 12	Ep 13
Jon Reep	IN	SAFE	IN	IN	IN	IN	LCS
Lavell Crawford	SAFE	IN	IN	IN	IN	IN	OUT
Gerry Dee	IN	IN	IN	IN	IN	OUT	
Amy Schumer	IN	IN	SAFE	IN	OUT		
Ralph Harris	WIN	IN	WIN	OUT			
Doug Benson	IN	IN	OUT				
Matt Kirshen	IN	WIN	OUT				
Debra DiGiovanni	IN	OUT					
Dante	OUT						
Gina Yashere	OUT						

LCS means the comic was the last comic standing
SAFE means the comic won the immunity challenge
WIN means the comic participated in and won a head-to-head showdown
OUT means the comic lost a head-to-head showdown or viewer vote, and was eliminated

=== Season 6 (2008) ===
Bill Bellamy again hosted; British television host Fearne Cotton joined him as co-host.

Season 6 semi-final rounds were held and filmed in Las Vegas at the Paris Hotel & Casino. The season finale also aired from Las Vegas. The season premiered on May 22, 2008 and was aired in Britain on Paramount Comedy.

The season finale aired on August 7, 2008 during which Iliza Shlesinger was selected as the winner, the first and only woman to win the title. Marcus was the season 6 runner-up.

Elimination chart
Comics	Head-to-head		Public elimination		
Comics	Ep 8	Ep 9	Ep 10	Ep 11	Ep 12
Iliza Shlesinger	WIN	WIN	IN	IN	LCS
Marcus	IN	IN	SAFE	IN	OUT
Jeff Dye	IN	SAFE	IN	IN	OUT
Jim Tavare	SAFE	IN	IN	IN	OUT
Louis Ramey	IN	IN	IN	IN	OUT
Sean Cullen	IN	IN	IN	OUT	
Ron G.	IN	IN	IN	OUT	
Adam Hunter	IN	IN	IN	OUT	
Papa CJ	IN	OUT			
Paul Foot	IN	OUT			
Esther Ku	OUT				
God's Pottery	OUT				

LCS means the comic was the last comic standing
SAFE means the comic won the immunity challenge
WIN means the comic participated in and won a head-to-head showdown
OUT means the comic lost a head-to-head showdown or viewer vote, and was eliminated

=== Season 7 (2010) ===
The seventh season premiered on June 7, 2010, hosted by Craig Robinson. The show again was reworked following a format similar to the one used for Season 3, without a House or Challenges; voting began right after the Semi-Finals. The judges for season 7 were Greg Giraldo, Natasha Leggero, and Andy Kindler. Comedians who appeared in this season include James Adomian, Paula Bel, Claudia Cogan, Alycia Cooper, Ed Bedard, Jim David, Jimmy Dore, Felipe Esparza, Rachel Feinstein, David Feldman, Fortune Feimster, Kirk Fox, Nikki Glaser, Kyle Grooms, Tiffany Haddish, Ryan Hamilton, Michael J. Herbert, Rik Sansone, Adrienne Iapalucci, Jesse Joyce, Myq Kaplan, Cathy Ladman, Jamie Lee, Jared Logan, Shane Mauss, Amanda Melson, Kurt Metzger, Brian McKim, Jason Nash, Christina Pazsitzky, Chip Pope, Jeff Ragsdale, Jerry Rocha, Rajiv Satyal, Jonathan Thymius, Guy Torry, Jason Weems, and Taylor Williamson. The winner was Felipe Esparza.

Elimination chart
Comics	Public elimination				
Comics	Ep 6	Ep 7	Ep 8	Ep 9	Ep 10
Felipe Esparza	IN	IN	IN	IN	LCS
Tommy Johnagin	IN	IN	IN	IN	OUT
Roy Wood, Jr.	IN	IN	IN	IN	OUT
Mike DeStefano	IN	IN	IN	IN	OUT
Myq Kaplan	IN	IN	IN	IN	OUT
Jonathan Thymius	IN	IN	IN	OUT	
Rachel Feinstein	IN	IN	OUT		
Maronzio Vance	IN	OUT			
Laurie Kilmartin	IN	OUT			
James Adomian	IN	OUT			

LCS means the comic was the last comic standing
OUT means the comic was eliminated based on viewer votes

=== Season 8 (2014) ===
Season 8 premiered on May 22, 2014, and consisted of 13 episodes. Roseanne Barr, Keenen Ivory Wayans, and Russell Peters served as judges and J. B. Smoove was the host. The winner received $250,000 and an NBC comedy development deal. Eliminated contestants faced off in an online head-to-head competition called the "Comic Comeback", with fans voting via Twitter to bring back a comic to perform on the season finale.

Rather than holding open "live" auditions as in previous seasons, the eighth season began with 100 comedians who were invited by an NBC panel, based on reviews of emailed audition submissions. The first four nights of the season ("Invitationals") featuried 25 comics with the winning comics from these rounds advancing to the semifinals.

Night one and night two aired in a two-hour block on May 22, 2014. These comics advanced to the semi-finals on night one: Tracey Ashley, Mark Normand, Dave Landau, Aida Rodriguez, Joe Machi, and Rod Man. On night two, comics advancing to the semi-final round included: Dana Eagle, Nick Guerra, Erin Jackson, Mike Vecchione, Jasper Redd, Lachlan Patterson, Tyree Elaine, and Jimmy Shubert. Night three aired on May 29, during which the following comics advanced to the next round of the competition: Chloe Hilliard, Alingon Mitra, Gerald Kelly, Zainab Johnson, DC Benny, Emily Galati, and Rocky LaPorte. Airing on June 5, the fourth night saw the advancement of Karlous Miller, DeAnne Smith, Nikki Carr, Tommy Ryman, Yamaneika Saunders, Mike Gaffney, and Monroe Martin. In all, 28 of the initial 100 comics advanced to the semi-finals.

The semi-finals consisted of two shows of 14 contestants each; five comics from each episode advancing to the Top Ten. In the rounds, Amy Schumer and executive producer Wanda Sykes appeared in segments giving advice to the contestants. Comics advancing through the semi-finals into the challenge rounds are shown in the accompanying table.

In the challenge rounds, the comics attempted to gain immunity from the head-to-head showdown that closed each episode. They participated in challenges which tested their skills in various comic situations. In the sketch comedy challenge (Episode 7), teams of five received advice from comic actress Cheryl Hines, with one entire team being granted immunity. Jay Leno provided advice for the talk show guest challenge (Episode 8), while Ellen DeGeneres hosted the challenge on the set of her show to determine the one comic granted immunity. For the improvisation challenge (Episode 9), Howie Mandel provided advice and one comic was granted immunity. Jeff Ross helped the comics prepare for a roast of Gilbert Gottfried (Episode 10), which determined immunity from the final head-to-head showdown. In all, the challenge rounds eliminated five contestants.

After the challenge rounds, the five finalists competed in the title rounds. They performed for the judges who eliminated whoever they deemed as the weakest performer. They narrowed down the contestants over three episodes (11, 12 and 13) deciding on the winner. The finale included performances by judges Barr, Peters, and the winner of the online Comic Comeback poll, Alingon Mitra.

Beginning with this season, the public did not vote for the Last Comic Standing at any time. The judges made every decision and picked the winner. That happened because Sykes decided that the judges would make a better decision than the potential voting public.

The eighth season winner was Rod Man. He beat out Nikki Carr and Lachlan Patterson in what turned out to be a double-elimination final set. The judges were supposed to narrow the field down to two contestants following the first sets of the two-hour finale, but could not agree on a weakest performance. All three finalists performed another set to determine the winner.

Elimination chart
Comics	Challenge rounds				Title rounds			
Comics	Ep 7	Ep 8	Ep 9	Ep 10	Ep 11	Ep 12	Ep 13	Ep 13
Rod Man	SAFE	WIN	IN	IN	IN	IN	LOW	LCS
Nikki Carr	WIN	IN	IN	WIN	IN	IN	IN	OUT
Lachlan Patterson	WIN	SAFE	WIN	IN	LOW	LOW	IN	OUT
Joe Machi	WIN	IN	SAFE	SAFE	IN	OUT		
Rocky LaPorte	IN	IN	IN	IN	OUT			
Karlous Miller	WIN	IN	IN	OUT				
Monroe Martin	WIN	IN	SD					
DC Benny	IN	OUT						
Aida Rodriguez	OUT							
Jimmy Shubert	OUT							

LCS means the comic was the last comic standing
WIN means the comic won an immunity challenge
SAFE means the comic was nominated and won a head-to-head showdown
LOW means the comic was the last to advance in a judges' vote
OUT means the comic was nominated lost a head-to-head showdown (episodes 7-10) or lost judges' vote (episodes 11-13), and was eliminated
SD means the comic was nominated and eliminated in a sudden-death round (1)

(1) Joe Machi opposed Monroe Martin in Week 9's head-to-head elimination. After their sets, the judges said that they were "blown away" by the performance of each comic, and could not agree on a winner. They asked each comic to perform two additional minutes, after which they still could not pick a winner. (Judge Russell Peters was heard shouting, "That solved nothing!") The comics performed a final joke in a sudden-death showdown, Machi won.

After the semi-finals, viewers voted for the "Comic Comeback", in which a dismissed comic can earn the chance to return and perform a set in the final episode of Season 8. Alingon Mitra beat out the 5 other dismissed contestants to become the Comic Comeback winner. He performed a set in the season finale on August 14.

=== Season 9 (2015) ===
NBC renewed Last Comic Standing for a ninth season, which premiered on July 22, 2015. Season 9 was hosted by Anthony Jeselnik; the judges were Keenen Ivory Wayans and Roseanne Barr, returning from the previous season, as well as new judge Norm Macdonald. The top prize, as in the previous season, was $250,000 and an NBC development deal. Season 9 was shorter than any previous season, with only 8 episodes. It eliminated much of the structure of previous seasons, including contestants competing against one another in a variety of challenges, and unstructured interactions between contestants, in favor of a simple series of stand-up performances.

As in the previous season, 100 comics were selected by an NBC panel to compete in the Invitationals. There were five rounds of Invitationals, with 20 comics starting each round. Invitationals Part 1 aired in a two-hour block on July 22, and consisted of the first two rounds. These comics from Round 1 moved on to the semifinals: Taylor Tomlinson, Ian Bagg, Ryan Conner, Ms. Pat, Mehran Khaghani, Moses Storm, DC Ervin, and K-Von.

Moving on from Round 2 were: Ambrose Jones III, Esther Povitsky, Crystian Ramirez, Bryan Kellen, Kevin Bozeman and Amy Miller. Invitationals Part 2 (Round 3) aired on July 29 and saw the following comics make it to the semifinals: Andy Erikson, Greg Warren, Dominique, Tony Baker, Francisco Ramos, Cyrus McQueen, KT Tatara, Alycia Cooper and Sammy Obeid. Advancing from Invitationals Part 3 (Round 4) that aired August 5 were: Sheng Wang, Joe List, Mike Siegel, Drew Thomas, Andi Smith, Amir Gollan, Brad Loekle and Shakir Standley. The final round of invitationals (Part 4) aired on August 12 and sent the following to the semifinals: Clayton English, Noah Gardenschwarz, Ricarlo Flanagan, Melanie Barchow, Amir K, Lavar Walker, Angelo Tsarukas, Harrison Greenbaum, Mia Jackson, and Michael Palascak.

Part 1 of the two-part semifinals aired August 19 and saw Taylor Tomlinson, Andy Erikson, Francisco Ramos, Sheng Wang and Clayton English advance the Top 10 finals. In Part 2 of the semifinals, aired on August 26, Ian Bagg, Ryan Conner, Dominique, Joe List, and Michael Palascak advanced to the Top 10 finals.

On September 2, 2015, the Top 10 comics were paired in head-to-head duels, as follows, and trimmed to five finalists (winners in bold):

- **Michael Palascak** vs. Taylor Tomlinson
- Francisco Ramos vs. **Ian Bagg**
- **Andy Erikson** vs. Ryan Conner
- Sheng Wang vs. **Dominique**
- **Clayton English** vs. Joe List

The finale aired on September 9, 2015. All five remaining finalists performed one set, after which Clayton English was declared the Season 9 winner.

Elimination chart
Comics	Ep 7	Ep 8
Clayton English	WIN	**LCS**
Andy Erikson	WIN	**OUT**
Dominique	WIN	**OUT**
Ian Bagg	WIN	**OUT**
Michael Palascak	WIN	**OUT**
Joe List	**OUT**	
Sheng Wang	**OUT**	
Ryan Conner	**OUT**	
Francisco Ramos	**OUT**	
Taylor Tomlinson	**OUT**	

LCS means the comic was the last comic standing
WIN means the comic participated in and won a head-to-head showdown
OUT means the comic lost a head-to-head showdown or judges' vote, and was eliminated

== Controversy ==
During season two, a panel of four celebrity judges was used to shrink the field of 40 semifinalists to ten finalists. The celebrity judges rated each of the semifinalists as they performed and cast votes for the 10 top comedians. When the ten finalists were announced the list did not seem to correspond with the judges' votes, which the judges noticed. Two celebrity judges, comedians Drew Carey and Brett Butler, left the judges' table visibly angry after the finalists were announced.

The two were shown backstage arguing with producers. Carey and Butler did not understand how the finalists who were announced could have advanced, given the way the judges had voted. It was revealed that a panel of four producers were also casting votes in the process, assuring that unless all four celebrity judges cast exactly the same ten votes, their voting power could be usurped by the four unanimously agreeing producers. If for some reason all four celebrity judges did cast exactly the same votes, the worst the producers could be faced with was a tie.

After learning of that, Carey became angry that the producers made it seem he had a deciding vote in the outcome of the show, calling the situation "crooked and dishonest." It was also revealed that some of the finalists who advanced were clients or employees of the producers or directors of the show.

According to a March 2004 Pittsburgh Post-Gazette article by Gene Collier, some of the competitors in opening rounds were plants hired by the producers to give bad performances on purpose to liven up the auditions on television.

Top local agents are usually given a number of specific call times for their clients. The first round of auditions were in front of a producer early in the morning; those who were chosen performed for the celebrity judges in the afternoon. Mark Breslin, the owner of Yuk Yuk's comedy clubs, which hosted the Toronto audition for season 6, also confirmed that while only two were shown advancing in the final broadcast, four comics had been initially chosen to advance to the finals. Brian Lazanik, one of the two finalists who did not end up at the Las Vegas finals said that he was also chosen as a finalist in season 5's Toronto auditions, but was similarly cut. Producers for the show called his agent, urging him to try out again for season 6.

Esther Povitsky claims to have had an argument with judge Norm Macdonald in season 9 of the show, although this was not broadcast.
