= Adrienne Iapalucci =

American comedian

- Born: February 17, 1978 (age 48); New York City, New York, U.S.

Comedy career
- Medium: Stand-up, television
- Genres: Observational comedy, blue comedy, crude humor, off-color humor, sarcasm
- Subjects: Everyday life, pop culture, current events
- Website: www.adrienneiapalucci.com

Adrienne Iapalucci (born February 17, 1978) is an American stand-up comedian. As of 2024, she has 20 years of experience in stand-up comedy. She is known for her comedy album Baby Skeletons and her Netflix special The Dark Queen, as well as her appearances on Last Comic Standing and The Degenerates. Iapalucci has also participated in the SXSW Comedy Festival.

== Early life ==
Iapalucci was born and raised in the Morris Park section of the Bronx, New York City. She attended community college before enrolling at Fordham University, where she graduated with a degree in sociology.

== Career ==
In December 2020, Iapalucci released her first comedy album entitled Baby Skeletons, which she had recorded in 2018.

After touring with Louis C.K., she appeared on his Back to the Garden special in January 2023.

Iapalucci's second special was directed by Louis C.K. in December 2023 and released on Netflix on November 12, 2024. Louis described Iapalucci as “one of [his] favorite comedians.”
