= Jimmy Shubert =

American stand-up comedian and Actor

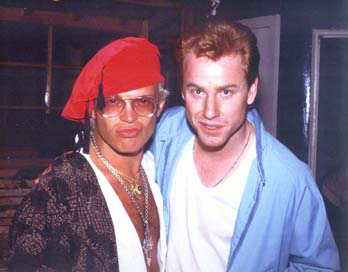
- Jimmy Shubert (right) with musician Billy Idol
- Born: James Francis Shubert; Philadelphia, Pennsylvania
- Occupation(s): Stand-up comedian, actor
- Years active: 1980s–present
- Website: jimmyshubert.com

Jimmy Shubert is a stand-up comedian from Philadelphia now living in Los Angeles. He is known for being part of Sam Kinison's "Outlaws of Comedy," as a 2014 finalist on Last Comic Standing, and for acting roles on shows such as The King of Queens, Entourage, and ER, and movies including Go and Mr. and Mrs. Smith.

He has released four stand-up albums produced by Grammy-winner Dan Schlissel, including the 2020 release Zero Tolerance, which reached No. 1 on the iTunes comedy chart. Reviewer Richard Lanoie, writing on The Serious Comedy Site, called Shubert "an aggressive, not overly blue comic who has a caustic take on the world," and said "Zero Tolerance more than proves [that] Shubert is the very best at rant comedy."

== Early life ==
Shubert was born in Philadelphia. His father was a city homicide detective and his mother worked in special education. He has five brothers. Shubert attended Archbishop Ryan High School and Philadelphia High School for Creative and Performing Arts, where he studied drama and became a professional magician at 15.

== Career ==
Shubert decided to be a comedian at 18, and after performing on local stages, moved to California to start his career. He worked as a doorman at Los Angeles club The Comedy Store, and lived in a house owned by the club's owner Mitzi Shore with roommates Andrew Dice Clay, Sam Kinison, and Marc Maron. He wrote jokes for Yakov Smirnoff, Jimmy Walker, and Louie Anderson. He befriended Kinison in 1984 after accepting a dare to drive his motorcycle onstage during Kinison's set. Later, he was part of Kinison's "Outlaws of Comedy," opening for him on tour for five years before Kinison's 1992 death.

Shubert was a finalist on NBC's Last Comic Standing in 2014, and has performed on Comedy Central Presents and Comedy Underground with Dave Attell.

Along with Lewis Black and Doug Stanhope, he was one of the first comedians signed to the label Stand Up! Records, which has released four of his albums. His style has been described as "old-school" observational comedy with "the outlook of a modern-day Archie Bunker" about everyday annoyances like Starbucks and airport security. Jason Birchmeier of Allmusic said that "Shubert's confidence and lucid delivery enhances his humor, making even his most perverse moments hilarious."

From 2013 to 2015, he hosted 51 episodes of half-hour podcast The Jimmy Shubert Show.

== Selected filmography ==
- ER (2 episodes, 1998–1999)
- Go (1999)
- Angel (1999)
- Coyote Ugly (2000)
- One Hour Photo (2002)
- The Italian Job (2003)
- Reno 911! (2005)
- Mr. and Mrs. Smith (2005)
- The King of Queens (10 episodes, 2001–2006)
- Entourage (4 episodes, 2007–2009)
- 2 Broke Girls (2011)
- Maron (2016)
- American Nightmares (2018)

== Discography ==
- Animal Instincts (-ismist Recordings/Stand Up! Records, 2001)
- Pandemonium (Stand Up! Records, 2005)
- Alive & Kickin' (Stand Up! Records, 2009)
- Zero Tolerance (Stand Up! Records, video 2019, download 2020)
