= Sheng Wang =

Taiwanese American comedian

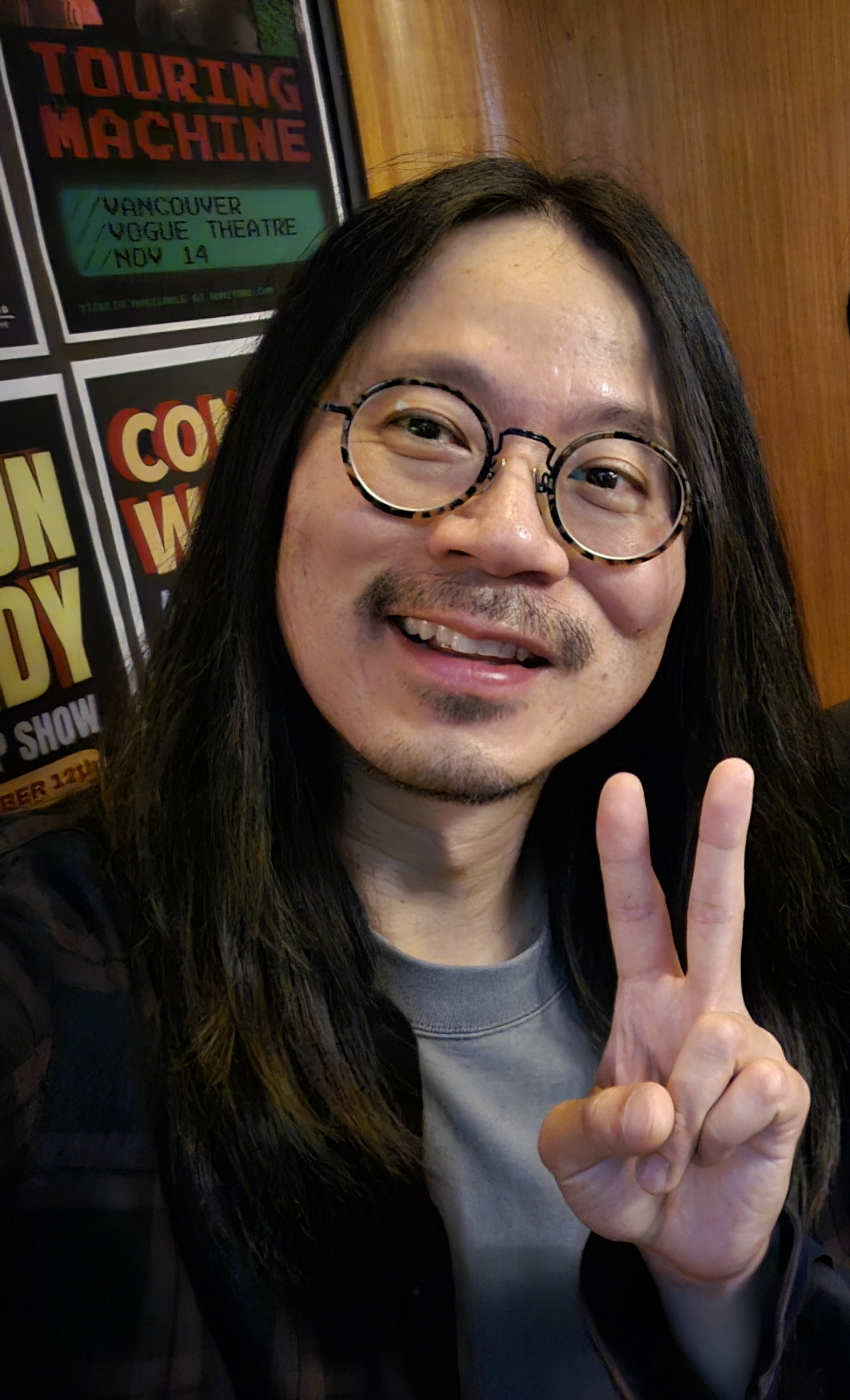
- Wang in 2024
- Born: January 8, 1980 (age 46); Taipei City, Taiwan
- Education: University of California, Berkeley
- Notable work: Sweet & Juicy

Comedy career
- Years active: 2002–present
- Medium: Stand-up, Television
- Genre: Observational comedy
- Website: shengwangtime.com

Sheng Wang (born January 9, 1980, in Taipei) is a Taiwanese American stand-up comedian and was a staff writer for ABC sitcom series Fresh Off the Boat from 2015 to 2018. He grew up in Houston, Texas.

== Early life and education ==
Wang was born in Taipei and grew up in Houston, where he graduated from Bellaire High School. He earned a Bachelor of Science in Business at the University of California, Berkeley from 1998 to 2002. After graduating, Wang began practicing stand-up in San Francisco and New York City.

== Career ==
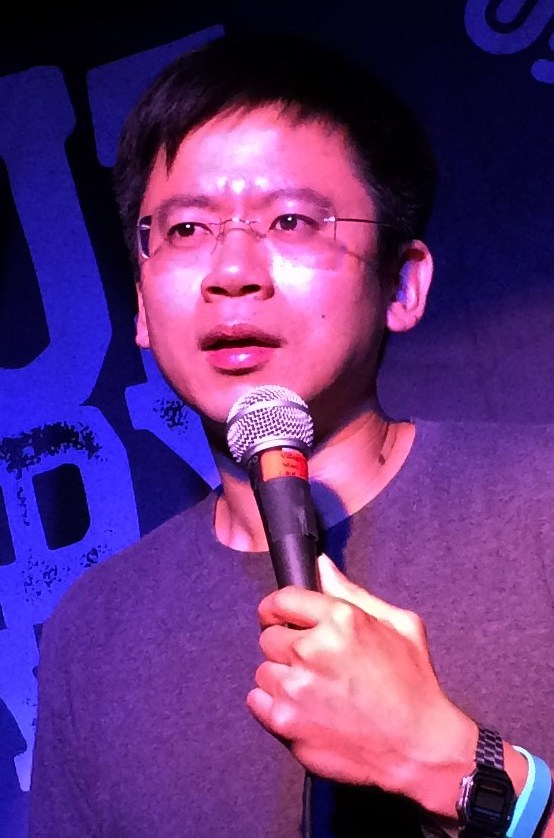
Wang in 2014

Wang was a featured performer in 2007 at Montreal Comedy Festival. On January 28, 2011, Comedy Central Presents aired his first thirty-minute special broadcast on national television. In January 2011, he won top honors at NBC Universal's Seventh Annual "Stand Up for Diversity" comedy search, including a one-year talent holding deal with that studio. Wang also appeared on Comedy Central's John Oliver's New York Stand-Up Show in 2012.

Wang also appeared on Comedians of Comedy, American Eagle's Campus Comedy Challenge and Comedy Central's Live at Gotham.

He competed in the 2015 season of Last Comic Standing, earning a spot in the top 10 contestants. Wang released an album titled Cornucopias Are Actually Horrible Containers in 2015.

From 2015 to 2018 he worked on ABC sit-com Fresh Off the Boat as a staff writer, story editor, and executive story editor. He appeared as "Hank" in two episodes.

In 2019, Wang appeared on the HBO Special 2 Dope Queens. He also performed at Clusterfest 2019 opening for headliner John Mulaney.

In September 2022 he released his first Netflix comedy special Sweet & Juicy. It was the first comedy special directed by Ali Wong. It was released to wide praise: The New York Times noted that Wang "has a droll and relaxed delivery, which makes the focus and inventiveness of his material land even better."

In April 2026 Wang released his second Netflix stand-up special, Purple. The special was filmed at Washington, D.C.'s Warner Theatre and directed by Ali Wong.

Sheng Wang lives in Los Angeles, California. He has cited Mitch Hedberg, Maria Bamford, Dave Attell, and Robert Hawkins as inspirations.
