= Andy Erikson =

American stand-up comedian

- Born: Andrea Erikson; February 6, 1987 (age 39); Ham Lake, Minnesota, U.S.

Comedy career
- Years active: 2007–present
- Medium: Stand up

Andrea "Andy" Erikson (born February 6, 1987) is a stand-up comedian known as one of the top five finalists on the 2015 season of the TV show Last Comic Standing.

In addition she is outspoken against misogyny in comedy, Marfan Syndrome awareness, and has worked to help the advancement of comedy clubs.

Now living in Los Angeles, Erikson and comic Amber Preston (a fellow Minnesota transplant) co-host a weekly comedy showcase, Punchline Punchout, at the Hollywood Improv; similar to a game show in format, the showcase gives comics 10 minutes to come up with punchlines on a given topic.

== Discography ==
- Secret Unicorn (2015)

Andy Erikson attended California State University North-ridge and achieved an MFA in Screenwriting in 2021. https://www.linkedin.com/in/andy-erikson-27301b44

== Filmography ==
Year	Title	Role	Notes
2015	Last Comic Standing	Herself	
2016	Scream Queens	Marguerite Honeywell	4 Episodes
