= Ricarlo Flanagan =

American actor, comedian, and rapper (1980–2021)

- Born: Ricarlo Erik Flanagan; March 23, 1980; Cleveland, Ohio, U.S.
- Died: October 9, 2021 (aged 41); Los Angeles, California, U.S.
- Occupations: Actor, comedian, rapper

Ricarlo Erik Flanagan (March 23, 1980 – October 9, 2021) was an American actor, comedian, and rapper.

== Biography ==
Flanagan was born in Cleveland, Ohio, on March 23, 1980. He was a semifinalist in the ninth season of Last Comic Standing. He also acted in several television shows, including the series Shameless.

Flanagan died from complications of COVID-19 in Los Angeles on October 9, 2021, during the COVID-19 pandemic in California. He was 41 years old.
