= Shane Mauss =

American comedian and podcast host

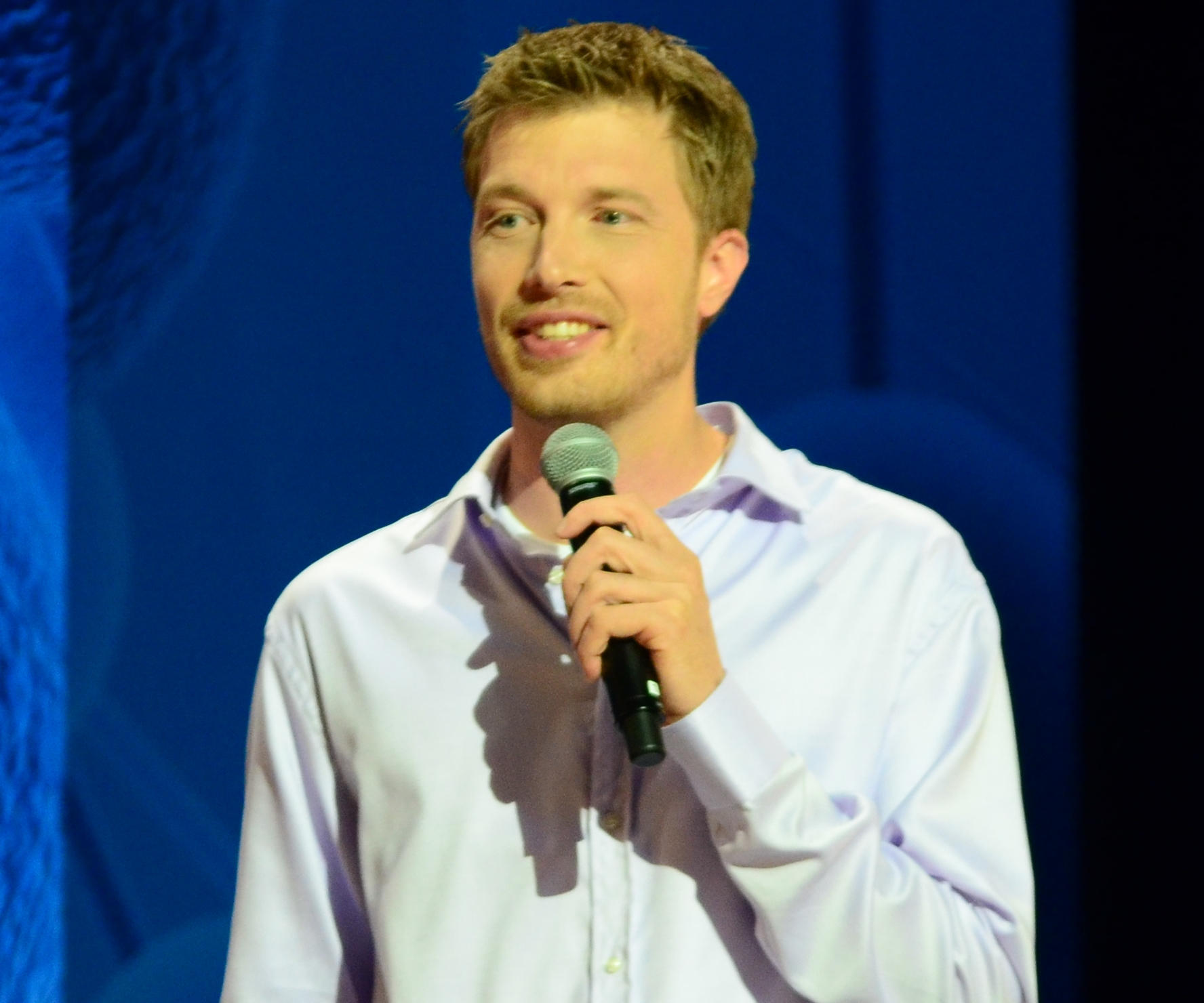
- Born: May 25, 1980 (age 46)

Comedy career
- Years active: 2004–present
- Medium: Stand-up
- Website: shanemauss.com

Shane Mauss is an American comedian from Onalaska, Wisconsin. Between 2010 and 2015, he released three comedy albums, one of which has been released as a television special; he also stars in the documentary film Psychonautics: A Comic's Exploration Of Psychedelics (2018). He hosts the Here We Are podcast (2014–present), in which he interviews scientists and academics from across the country, and co-hosts Mind Under Matter, a comedy/science podcast.

== History ==
Mauss is of German and Irish descent. He has said that his distant ancestors were Jewish and went by the name "Mosche" (Hebrew word for ‘Moses’) in 17th century Switzerland.

According to Mauss, he has wanted to be a standup comedian since he was ten years old. At age 15, he started writing jokes, but due to anxiety and being unsure as to how to get into standup comedy, he did not pursue a career until the age of 23. Mauss intended on going to New York City or Los Angeles to start his career, but instead decided to move to Boston with a friend. For several months, Mauss performed at open mic nights in Boston while struggling with anxiety. By practicing, and with the help of friends, Mauss overcame his anxiety and began performing in comedy clubs approximately six months after starting his career as a standup comedian. Shortly after he started playing in clubs, Mauss entered into the Greater Boston Alternative Comedy Festival and made it to the final round of elimination. He partially credits the attention he received from this achievement for launching his career and has performed at the festival several times since.

In 2007, shortly after his first performance at the Greater Boston Alternative Comedy Festival, Mauss won the Best Standup Comic Award at HBO's Comedy Arts Festival. This led to Mauss being invited to perform several times on Late Night with Conan O'Brien. He has since performed on Conan O'Brien's various late night talk shows a total of five times.

In 2010, Mauss published his first comedy album, Jokes To Make My Parents Proud. Punchline Magazine named the album one of the top ten albums of 2010.

In 2014, Mauss broke both of his feet while hiking. He used the experience as inspiration for his 2015 comedy album, My Big Break. On June 18 of that year, Mauss appeared on Ken Reid's TV Guidance Counselor podcast. Also that year, his second special, Mating Season (2014), was released.

Mauss's podcast, Here We Are (2014–present), focuses on subjects such as science, psychedelics, and the social trait of "openness", which he describes as not being "scared of novelty and ambiguity, but you really thrive off of it." He has also toured a show called "Stand Up Science" (c. 2020). Additionally, Mauss co-hosts a comedy/science podcast called Mind Under Matter (2021–present) with artist and fellow podcaster Ramin Nazer, who commonly does voice impressions (including those of other podcast personalities) and creates art for every episode; Patreon-exclusive content includes discussion of these illustrations in the side podcast Mind Under Art. Mauss has also appeared on the podcasts WTF with Marc Maron, The Joe Rogan Experience, You Made It Weird with Pete Holmes, The Duncan Trussell Family Hour, This Past Weekend, and Bertcast.

== Filmography ==
=== Film ===
Year	Title	Role	Notes
2013	Shane Mauss: Mating Season	Himself	Stand-up comedy special
2018	Psychonautics: A Comic's Exploration Of Psychedelics	Himself	Documentary

=== Television ===
Year	Title	Role	Notes
2007	Late Night with Conan O'Brien	Himself	Guest comedian
2007	Late Night with Conan O'Brien	Himself	Guest comedian
2008	Live at Gotham	Himself	
2008	Comics Without Borders	Himself	
2008	Late Night with Conan O'Brien	Himself	Guest comedian
2010	Comedy Central Presents	Himself	
2010	The Bob & Tom Show	Himself	
2010	Jimmy Kimmel Live!	Himself	
2011	The Green Room with Paul Provenza	Himself	
2011	Conan	Himself	Guest comedian
2012	Funny as Hell	Himself	Writer
2013	Conan	Himself	Guest comedian
2014	Getting Doug with High	Himself	Guest comedian

== Discography ==
- Jokes To Make My Parents Proud (2010)
- Mating Season (2014)
- My Big Break (2015)
