= Rocky LaPorte =

American comedian

Rocky LaPorte is an American actor and a stand-up comedy performer. In 2005 he had his own stand-up special on Comedy Central Presents. After the comedian Tim Allen watched Rocky on The Tonight Show, he claimed Rocky as his "favorite new comic" and brought him on to play in his movie The Shaggy Dog. Rocky visited Iraq with Drew Carey, and the trip became a movie called Patriot Act: a Jeffrey Ross Home Movie, which aired on Showtime. He was also one of the few comedians to get a standing ovation on The Tonight Show with Jay Leno.

Rocky was a finalist in the eighth season of NBC's Last Comic Standing finishing in the top five, Rocky qualified to perform on the Last Comic Standing Tour, which took place in the fall of 2014.

== Filmography ==
- The Pat Sajak Show 1989
- The Magic Johnson Show 1989
- 1989 Johnnie Walker National Comedy Search (1989)
- Cheers (episode: "Ma Always Liked You Better", 1990)
- Evening at the Improv (1989, 1991, 1992)
- Caroline's Comedy Club Hour, (1989, 1990)
- The Tonight Show with Jay Leno (episode: October 6, 2004)
- Comedy Central Presents: Rocky LaPorte (2005)
- Patriot Act: A Jeffrey Ross Home Movie (2005)
- Just for Laughs (episode: November 20, 2005)
- The Shaggy Dog (2006)
- The Godfathers Of Comedy. (2009)
- The Very Funny Show (2009)
- Crazy on the Outside (2010)
- Last Comic Standing (2014)
- Ron White, Salute to the Troops (2015), CW
