= Amber Preston =

American stand-up comedian

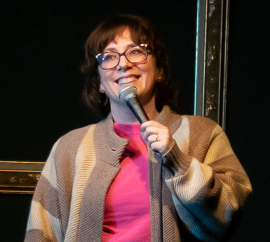
- Born: Fargo, North Dakota, U.S.
- Occupations: Stand-up comedian Actor

Amber Preston is a stand-up comedian originally from North Dakota and Minnesota and now living in Los Angeles.

In 2011, comic Marc Maron named her one of his five top comedians to watch, calling her a "brassy gal ... who could play a one-nighter at a bowling alley or a 1,000-seat theater and just nail it." In 2018, entertainment website Thrillist named her one of the best undiscovered comedians in America.

Her debut album, Sparkly Parts, was released April 17, 2020, on Stand Up! Records, debuting at No. 1 on both the Amazon and iTunes comedy charts.

== Early life ==
Preston grew up in Fargo, North Dakota and graduated from West Fargo High School in 1996. She is related to television accordionist and bandleader Lawrence Welk, a topic she has joked about in her standup. She moved to Minneapolis in the late 1990s, where she earned a theater degree from the University of Minnesota. In 2014, she moved to Los Angeles to concentrate on her standup and acting career.

== Career ==
Preston began performing standup shortly after college. Her comedy is often autobiographical, and includes topics such as her Upper Midwest accent and Fargo upbringing. A lifelong fan of pop group New Kids on the Block, Preston will sometimes read aloud onstage from a series of novels published in the early 1990s in which the group has adventures in the mode of the Hardy Boys.

She was the 2011 winner of the Best of the Midwest competition at Gilda's Laughfest in Grand Rapids, Michigan. She was a finalist in the 2012 Great American Comedy Festival competition held in Norfolk, Nebraska, hometown of Johnny Carson. In 2011, she was named one of the top 100 creative people in Minneapolis by City Pages.

Preston and comic Andy Erikson (a fellow Minnesota transplant) co-host a weekly comedy showcase, Punchline Punchout, at the Hollywood Improv in Los Angeles; similar to a game show in format, the showcase gives comics 10 minutes to come up with punchlines on a given topic.

== Discography ==
- Sparkly Parts (Stand Up! Records, 2020)

Because of the coronavirus quarantine, Preston livestreamed a comedy set from her home in lieu of a traditional record-release show for Sparkly Parts.

Reviewer Richard Lanoie, writing on The Serious Comedy Site, called Sparkly Parts "a hoot to listen to" with "no weak moments."

== Filmography ==
Preston starred in the 2019 short film The Poacher, which screened at the 2020 Los Angeles Short Film Festival, Culver City Film Festival, and Yucca Valley Film Festival.

== Other work ==
=== Podcast appearances ===
WTF with Marc Maron, Episode 1132: Amber Preston, J-L Cauvin (June 18, 2020)
Stuffed Animal Party, Episode 3: Erik Allen is a Real Doctor (March 22, 2013)
WTF with Marc Maron, Episode 292: Live From Gilda's Laughfest (June 28, 2012)
WTF with Marc Maron, Episode 576: Whitney Cummings, Shelby Fero, Pamela Adlon, Desi Jedeikin, Amber Preston (Feb. 12, 2015)
Magnotronic, Episode 315: Amber Preston (June 11, 2015)
The Dork Forest with Jackie Kashian, Episode 293: Live From the Bridgetown Comedy Festival (June 10, 2015)
Lady to Lady, Episode 130: Outrage Du Jour ft. Amber Preston (June 24, 2015)
Probably Science, Episode 178 with Amber Preston! (Sept. 9, 2015)
Obsessed with Joseph Scrimshaw, Episode 92: Amber Preston on New Kids on the Block (Jan. 7, 2016)
Magnotronic, Episode 626: Amber Preston (March 11, 2017)
Middle Of Somewhere, Winnipeg Vance and Amber Preston (March 30, 2020)
