= Corey Holcomb =

American comedian, radio host and actor (born 1969)

- Born: Corey Lamont Holcomb; June 23, 1969 (age 57); Chicago, Illinois, U.S.
- Occupations: Actor, comedian, radio host
- Years active: 1992–present
- Spouse: Maya Holcomb
- Children: 3
- Website: http://www.coreyholcomb.com/

Corey Lamont Holcomb (June 23, 1969) is an American comedian, radio host and actor. Born and raised in Chicago, Illinois, Holcomb got his start in comedy with the help of another Chicago-area comedian, Godfrey. He currently hosts his own internet show, The Corey Holcomb 5150 Show, which currently airs Tuesday nights (8PM-PST/11PM-EST), live on YouTube. He resides in Los Angeles, CA.

== Early life ==
Corey Holcomb was raised in Chicago's notorious (now defunct) Robert Taylor Homes.

== Career ==
Following a short college basketball career, Holcomb began a career as a stand-up comedian in Chicago. Holcomb, along with comedian Godfrey, began doing standup comedy in Chicago in the late 1990’s.

Often billing himself as the "Ghetto Dr. Phil", most of Holcomb's standup material revolves around relationships, particularly relationships gone wrong. In addition to touring the country, he has been a regular on the stand-up/improv-based television shows Comic View, Def Comedy Jam, Last Comic Standing, and Nick Cannon Presents Wild 'n Out. Early in his career, Holcomb appeared once on The Jerry Springer Show with fellow comedian DeRay Davis. He has appeared in three comedy specials of his own, Corey Holcomb: The Problem Is You, Comedy Central Presents: Corey Holcomb, and Corey Holcomb: Your Way Ain't Working. He also appeared on the 2010 edition of Shaquille O'Neal's All-Star Comedy Jam.

As an actor, Holcomb has appeared as guest star on several sitcoms such as Half & Half, Everybody Hates Chris, Tyler Perry's House of Payne and Black Jesus, as well as minor roles in films such as Like Mike and Dance Flick. Holcomb is a recurring voice actor for the Family Guy spin-off The Cleveland Show, for which he provides the voice of Robert Tubbs, Cleveland's rival and the ex-husband of his wife Donna. Holcomb was a regular personality on Jamie Foxx's satellite radio channel The Foxxhole from 2007 to 2011. He currently hosts his own internet show, The Corey Holcomb 5150 Show, which currently airs Tuesday nights (8PM-PST/11PM-EST), live on YouTube.

The Corey Holcomb 5150 Show often focuses on issues within the Black American community. Topics such as single mothers, police brutality, racism, and black economic development are often topics of conversation.

Holcomb is close friends with comedian Kevin Hart. Holcomb credits Hart, along with film producer Will Packer, with helping him earn roles in major motion pictures.

== Filmography ==
=== Films ===
Year	Program	Role	Notes
2002	Like Mike	Trucker Dad	
2003	The Watermelon Heist	Nicodemus Brown	
2005	Baggin'	Himself	TV movie
2009	Dance Flick	Sugar Bear Henchman	
2010	Shaquille O'Neal Presents: All-Star Comedy Jam	Himself	Video
2012	Who's Watching the Kids	Uncle Larry	
2014	Think Like a Man Too	Marty the One Man Party	
2015	The Wedding Ringer	Otis / Alzado	
2016	Boo! A Madea Halloween	Prisoner 2	
2021	Buck Breaking	Himself	Documentary

=== Television ===
Year	Program	Role	Notes
2001	The Tonight Show with Jay Leno	Himself	Episode: "Episode #9.1174"
2002	MADtv	Himself	Episode: "Episode #7.18"
2003–04	Half & Half	Chuancey	Recurring cast: season 2–3
2003–06	Laffapalooza	Himself	2 episodes
2004	Last Comic Standing	Himself	Season 2–3
2005	Comedy Central Presents	Himself	Episode: "Corey Holcomb"
2005–17	Wild 'n Out	Himself/Cast Member	Main cast: season 2–8
2006	Cuts	Himself	Episode: "Rogue Trip"
2007	All of Us	Shawn	Episode: "She Blinded Me with Science"
2007-09	Everybody Hates Chris	Black Moviegoer/Man in Store	2 episodes
2009–13	The Cleveland Show	Robert Tubbs	Recurring cast
2012	Let's Stay Together	Melvin	Episode: "The Apprentice"
2012	Family Time	Derrick	Recurring cast: season 1
2014–19	Black Jesus	Boonie	Main cast

=== Comedy Special ===
Year	Program	Role	Notes
2004	Corey Holcomb: The Problem Is You	Himself	
2012	Corey Holcomb: Your Way Ain't Working	Himself	
2023	Corey Holcomb: The Book of Coreythians	Himself	
