= Sean Kent =

Stand-up comedian

Sean Kent is a stand-up comic who stars on A&E's unscripted comedy Modern Dads. He won the 2011 San Francisco International Comedy Competition and the 2009 Seattle International Comedy Competition.

Originally from Austin, Texas, Kent resided in Los Angeles during his development as a comic, moving back to his hometown in 2011 with his partner, Rachel Dory, and their two daughters. He is also known for his stand-up comedy appearances on Showtime and Nickelodeon, and as a series regular on the NBC show Last Comic Standing (seasons 1 & 3). His comedy has been critically acclaimed by Rolling Stone and XM Radio, who called his debut CD "An instant classic".

== Early years ==
Kent attended Hyde Park Baptist Private School in Austin, where he lettered in Varsity Basketball and Cross Country. He was almost expelled several times but he still graduated in 1992. After high school, Kent attended the University of Texas at Austin but dropped out in 1994 to move to Los Angeles and pursue stand-up comedy.

== Cancer battle ==
In 2003 Kent landed his first staff writing job on The Best Damn Sports Show Period. While writing for Best Damn, he was diagnosed with stage III Hodgkin's lymphoma. He began undergoing chemotherapy one day a week while continuing to work. After three months of chemotherapy and 35 days of radiation therapy Kent was pronounced in remission. Shortly after finishing treatment, he auditioned and was subsequently chosen as a series regular for Last Comic Standing Season One.

Almost immediately after Last Comic Standing wrapped, Kent received news that his cancer had recurred. Facing a grim prognosis, he opted to undergo an intensive chemotherapeutic procedure known as an autologous bone marrow transplant which involved radically high doses of chemotherapy and long stays in the hospital. During one stay at City of Hope National Medical Center Kent developed an infection in his chest port and lost over 90 pounds. His doctors told him he had a 50% chance to live a year if he survived treatment, and he was released from the hospital in October 2003, returning to stand-up soon after.

== Later career ==
Kent was the first person voted off on Season 1 of Last Comic Standing. Kent competed on season 3 as well, advancing through 6 of 8 total episodes. In 2005, two years after his treatment, Kent was asked to give the keynote address at the 29th Annual City of Hope Bone Marrow Transplant Reunion. Since then he has regularly spoken and performed at cancer fundraisers, and in 2011 shared a bill with Will Ferrell at the Cancer for College Fundraiser.

In 2009 Kent won the 30th annual Seattle International Comedy Competition and appeared on Showtime's Green Collar Comedy Slam. In 2010 Kent toured the UK, appearing at The Stand and other clubs throughout Great Britain. In 2011 Kent won the 36th annual San Francisco International Comedy Competition

In 2013 Kent

- headlined the Operation Laughter tour for Armed Forces Entertainment to entertain American troops in the Middle East.
- was chosen to throw the ceremonial first pitch for the Dodgers as part of their Think Cure cancer fundraising campaign.
- was cast to star on A&E's new unscripted series, Modern Dads, which premiered on August 21, 2013.

== Recordings ==
In August 2005 he recorded and released his first hour-long comedy CD, Sex, Drugs, and Love, about pop-culture, politics, drug laws, and attitudes about sex in the U.S. It includes an outtake track of Kent battling a drunk woman in the audience plus the song Your Genitals are Evil, co-written with Tom Von Doom, formerly of the band Cycle Sluts From Hell.

In 2010 Kent released his second CD, Waiting for the Rapture for Uproar Entertainment. The Laugh Button has called it "... a jolt of hilarious though sometimes painful honesty. Tackling topics of 21st Century America, such as politics, Wal-Mart, hippies, recycling, Anderson Cooper and fundamentalist Christians. His appeal is to anyone who’s ever felt themselves an outcast, rebel, or dissatisfied with the world, while trying to figure out where it all went wrong."
