= Chris Porter (comedian) =

American comedian

Chris Porter (November 27, 1979) is an American comedian and finalist on season 4 of Last Comic Standing. He has also appeared on The Bob & Tom Show, Comedy Central's Live Tour, and appeared on Live at Gotham in summer 2006. In 2009, Porter made an appearance on Comedy Central Presents and in Screaming from the Cosmos. His 2014 comedy special Chris Porter: Ugly and Angry is available for streaming on Amazon Prime, PlutoTV, and YouTube (as of Oct. 13, 2024), as is the 2019 follow-up, Man From Kansas. Porter is from Shawnee, Kansas and currently resides in Los Angeles, California.

== Stand Up Specials ==
- Screaming from the Cosmos (2009)
- Ugly and Angry (2014)
- Lost and Alone (2017)
- A Man from Kansas (2019)
- No Money in Babies (2023)
- Middle Rage (2026)
