= Jeff Dye =

American stand-up comedian and actor

- Dye in 2026
- Born: Jeffrey Alden Dye; February 4, 1983 (age 43); Kent, U.S.
- Notable work: Money From Strangers; Girl Code; Comedy Central Presents Jeff Dye; Comic-Con All Access 2014; Extreme Makeover: Home Edition; Better Late Than Never

Comedy career
- Years active: 2007–present
- Website: www.jeffdye.com

Jeffrey Alden Dye (born February 4, 1983) is an American stand-up comedian and actor.

== Early life ==
Dye was born in 1983 in Seattle and raised in Kent, Washington. He attended Kentwood High School in Covington. Dye is of Spanish, French-Canadian, German and Jewish descent.

== Career ==
Dye has hosted two series for MTV—Numbnuts and Money From Strangers and also appeared on Girl Code. He was a finalist on the sixth season of the NBC series Last Comic Standing, finishing third behind Marcus and winner Iliza Shlesinger. He then performed in a 50-city tour with the other top competitors.

Dye performed at the TBS Comedy Festival in Chicago and Comedy Central's Live At Gotham before starring in his own half-hour comedy special titled Comedy Central Presents Jeff Dye in 2010. As of 2011, Dye was a recurring cast member on ABC's show Extreme Makeover: Home Edition.

Dye was the host of MTV's Club New Year's Eve 2013 Live from Times Square. Dye can be seen as the lead in Dierks Bentley's award-winning music video, "Drunk on a Plane". Dye was a correspondent for Spike TV's Comic-Con All Access 2014. In January 2015, he supported the Seattle Seahawks for ESPN's Enemy Territory. Dye was also a recurring celebrity cast member on NBC's game show I Can Do That which aired during the summer of 2015. Dye appeared on Ken Reid's TV Guidance Counselor podcast on September 16, 2015. He was on the 2016 reality show Better Late Than Never as the tour organizer and suitcase holder for William Shatner, Terry Bradshaw, George Foreman and Henry Winkler while they toured Asia. Also in 2016, Dye was a contestant playing for charity, on season 3, episode 18 of the game show Idiotest.

Dye returned to Better Late Than Never in 2017−2018 alongside Shatner, Bradshaw, Foreman and Winkler as "The Sidekick" while they toured Europe and Morocco. In 2019, Dye appeared in The Wedding Year. In 2020 and 2021, Dye served as a panelist on The Masked Singer and I Can See Your Voice.

Dye has been the host of Jeff Dye's Friendship Podcast on the All Things Comedy network since March 29, 2018.

In Spring of 2022, Dye began filming his first feature film entitled Stealing Jokes from director Mike Young. The film follows three comics who hit the road, turn the tables on shady club owners and pull off a major heist.

Dye joined Freddie Prinze Jr.'s professional wrestling based Podcast Wrestling with Freddie as a co-host.

In March 2023, Dye began hosting the daytime game show Who the Bleep Is That? on Fox.

== Personal life ==
Dye's elder sister, Janice, died in a car accident in Albany, Oregon, on December 3, 2015. Due to undiagnosed dyslexia, Dye did not learn to read until he was 22 years old. Dye is known for being a Bigfoot enthusiast and resides in Los Angeles, California. On October 9, 2023, Dye was arrested for DUI and fleeing the scene of an accident after driving his white Tesla into a tree at 9:56 AM.

In 2025, Dye announced that he was now conservative after being liberal most of his life.
