= Jay London =

American stand-up comic

- Born: September 12
- Occupation: Stand-up Comedian

Jay London (born September 12, 1966) is an American stand-up comic, whose one-liner jokes made him a favorite on NBC's Last Comic Standing. Although he did not win either of the two seasons in which he appeared (Seasons 2 and 3, both in 2004), his humble personality and clean comedy made him a favorite among the show's fans.

London was born in The Bronx, but grew up in Flushing, Queens, before moving to Los Angeles in his adult years. He was a boxer and a taxicab driver, among other occupations, before becoming a stand-up comic in the 1980s.

== Comedy style ==
London is known for his long curly hair and bib overalls. His signature line is "You might recognize me, I'm the fourth guy from the left on the evolutionary chart," referring to his slouching posture and unkempt appearance. His comedy is usually self-deprecating and laden with quips such as "0 for 1", "This is death!" and his trademark line, "It's almost over." During his run on Last Comic Standing, he made a guest appearance on The Tonight Show with Jay Leno.

After Last Comic Standing, London joined fellow Season 2 competitors Gary Gulman and Alonzo Bodden as part of the "I'm Still Standing" comedy tour. He has also done shows for cancer patients and small comedy clubs. In 2004, Jay made an appearance on the game show Street Smarts; in 2005, he appeared on the CBS sitcom The King of Queens, on the TBS reality show Minding the Store and Bravo's All-Star Reality Reunion.

On August 1, 2006, Mr. London made a return appearance on Last Comic Standing. The pilot to his television show, "The Jay London Show", debuted on his official website in January 2007 (costarring his real-life sister Melanie).

London served as the opening act on Louis C.K.'s 2015 stand up special, Live At The Comedy Store.
