= Brian McKim =

American stand-up comedian

Brian McKim is an American stand-up comedian. He was born and raised in New Jersey, calling himself "the Pride of Pennsauken", but moved to Los Angeles in 1988. He began performing in 1981.

In addition to performing as a standup comic, he is also a comedy writer. He has contributed to Fox Television's Comic Strip Live and was, along with his wife, professional comedian and writer, on the creative team for The John Debella Show. They co-authored a book, The Comedy Bible: The Complete Resource for Aspiring Comedians (release date: October 1, 2011).

== Personal life ==
In 1981, he received a bachelor of science degree in journalism from Temple University.

His wife, Traci Skene, is also a stand-up comedian.
