= Tammy Pescatelli =

American stand-up comedian

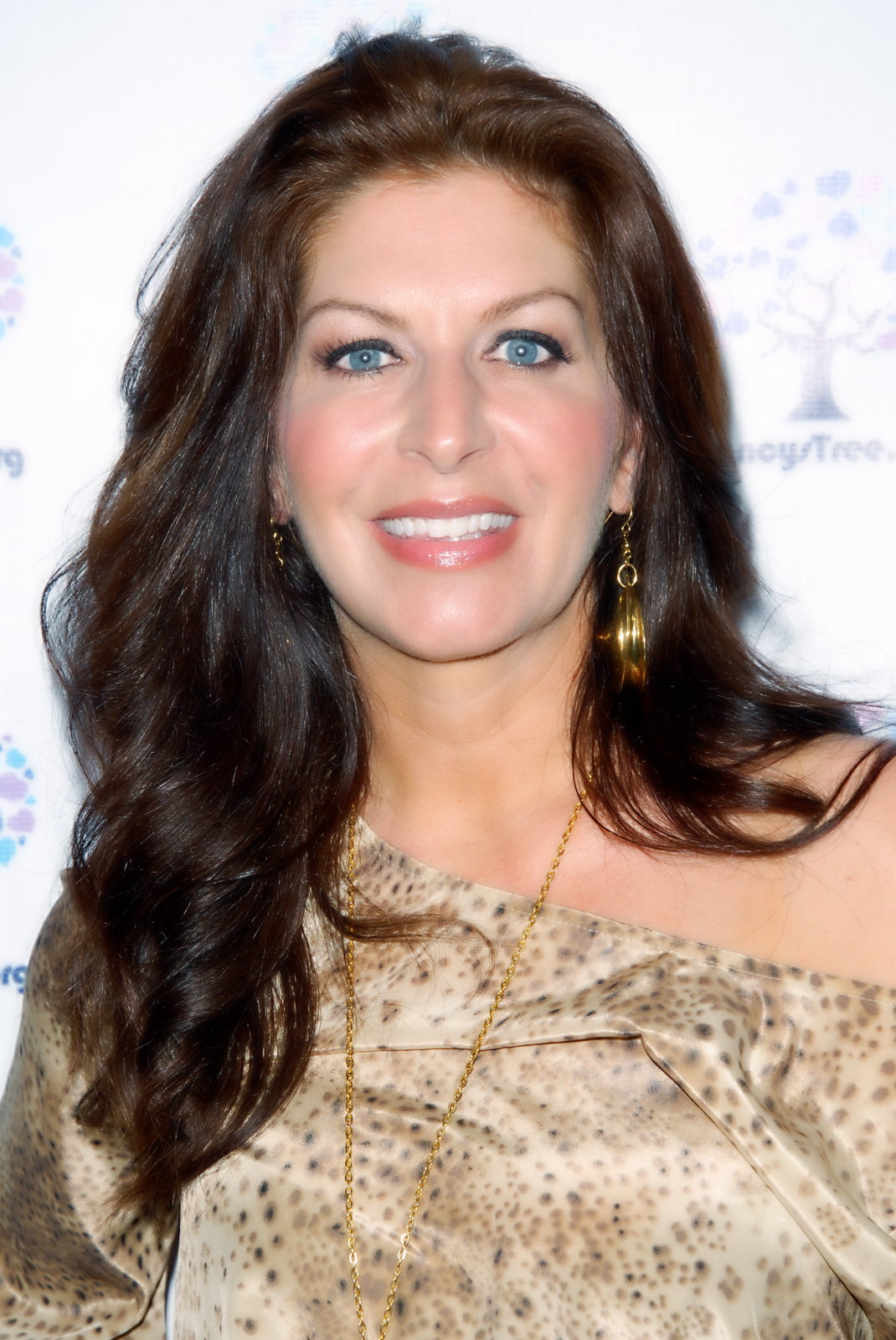
- Pescatelli in August 2012
- Born: Tammy Gillespie; May 15, 1969 (age 57); Perry, Ohio, U.S.
- Spouse: Luca Palanca

Comedy career
- Medium: Stand-up comedy, television, film
- Genre: Observational comedy
- Subjects: Interpersonal relationships, everyday life

Tammy Pescatelli (born Tammy Gillespie, May 15, 1969) is an American stand-up comedian.

== Early life, family and education ==
Pescatelli was born in Perry, Ohio. She spent summers during her childhood in her mother's hometown Meadville, Pennsylvania.

== Career ==
Pescatelli worked as a morning radio show co-host, performer, TV spokeswoman and basketball cheerleader from 1990 to 1995 in the Quad Cities area of southeastern Iowa and northwestern Illinois. Part of her show's humor originates from the interactions with her and her husband's families.

Her comedic career took off after appearing on NBC's Last Comic Standing in 2004 when she made the top six. She returned the following season but did not make the top 10.

In 2010, Pescatelli won Comedy Central's Standup Showdown.

Pescatelli co-created, executive produced, wrote and starred in a reality television series A Standup Mother (2011) on WE tv. Its focus is her life as a mother, wife, and comedian.

Her comedy special Finding the Funny was released with Netflix in 2013. It was selected "New and Noteworthy" by iTunes editors and hit number 3 on the charts.

== Personal life ==
Pescatelli married Luca Palanca on February 11, 2008. They moved to her mother's hometown Meadville, Pennsylvania, in 2009 after their son was born.

In 2011, Pescatelli was diagnosed with stage 2 ovarian cancer. She underwent surgery, was told she was "free and clear" of cancer and did not have to go through chemotherapy.
