= Dat Phan =

Vietnamese American stand-up comedian (born 1975)

- Born: January 25, 1975 (age 51); Saigon, South Vietnam

Comedy career
- Years active: 2003–present
- Medium: Stand-up, television, film
- Genre: Observational comedy
- Subjects: Everyday life, self-deprecation, racial stereotypes
- Website: datphan.com

Dat Phan (born January 25, 1975) is a Vietnamese-American stand-up comedian. He first rose to fame in 2003 after defeating runner-up Ralphie May to win Season 1 of Last Comic Standing.

In Fall 2004, he returned for the third season dubbed "Battle of the Best" which featured contestants from season 1 against season 2. He and May were eliminated in the fifth round.

== Early life ==
Phan was born in Saigon.

He immigrated to the United States as a child with his mother and nine other siblings. They suffered financial hardships throughout his childhood. He grew up in the City Heights neighborhood of San Diego, California then spent his teenage years in Santee, California, a suburb of San Diego.

He dropped out of Grossmont College to pursue comedy. He was later voted into Grossmont College's Walk of Fame.

== Career ==
In 2003, he entered the first season of NBC's stand-up comedy competition reality show, Last Comic Standing. According to the show's host Jay Mohr, Phan nonetheless was the surprise winner of Last Comic Standing and has subsequently made cameo appearances in Hollywood films such as Cellular and Love Is the Drug.

Dat Phan Productions released the DVD Dat Phan: Live and the CD You Touch, You Buy, in stores January 2010, and began pre-production on a movie titled Yellow Fever.

== Personal life ==
Phan has endorsed the Jade Ribbon Campaign established to fight against hepatitis B and liver cancer.

== Filmography ==
=== TV appearances ===
- Last Comic Standing 1 (2003)
- Good Morning, Miami (March 20, 2003)
- Comedy Central Presents: The Commies (2003)
- The Tonight Show with Jay Leno (August 6, 2003)
- The Late Late Show with Craig Kilborn (August 8, 2003)
- The Award Show Awards Show (2003)
- Tough Crowd with Colin Quinn (December 2003)
- The Wayne Brady Show (January 29, 2004)
- Comedy Central Presents: Dat Phan (2004)
- Danny Phantom (2004)
- The West Wing (February 18, 2004)
- Last Comic Standing 2 (August 12, 2004)
- Super Bowl XXXIX
- Last Comic Standing 3 (2004)
- Family Guy Episode 59 - Breaking Out Is Hard To Do (July 17, 2005)
- Asian Excellence Awards on May 28, 2007, nominated for Outstanding Comedy Performance
- Comedy Zen (2007)
- BET ComicView (December 11, 2007)
- The Tyra Banks Show Racial Stereotypes (September 30, 2009)
- DirecTV The Whale (July 20, 2011)

=== Filmography ===
- Cellular (2004)
- Love Is the Drug (2006)
- Spring Break '83 (2008)
- The Hungover Games (2014)
- Sake Bomb (2016)
- Kong: Skull Island (2017)
