= Rebecca Corry =

American comedian, writer and actress

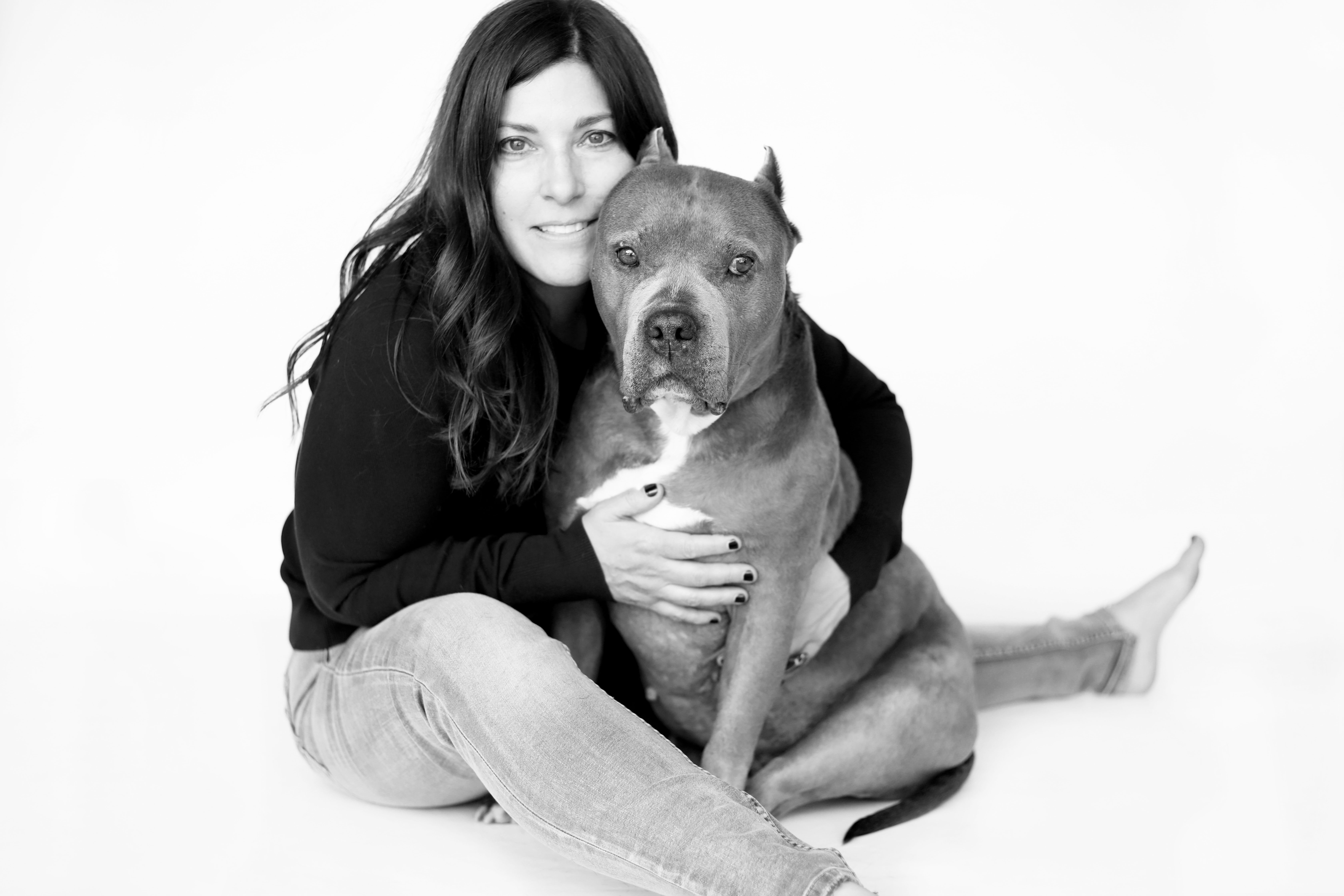
- Corry in 2021
- Born: Kent, Washington, U.S.
- Occupations: Comedian; writer; actress; activist
- Website: standupforpits.us

Rebecca Corry is an American actress, writer, comedian and activist who began her career studying at The Second City training center in Chicago.

== Biography ==
Corry was born in Kent, Washington, and moved to Chicago, Illinois, at age 19.

In 2006, she was a finalist on the fourth season of NBC's Last Comic Standing. Her half-hour Comedy Central Presents special premiered in 2009. Corry founded the Stand Up for Pits Foundation to work against abuse and discrimination towards pit bulls. In 2014, she organized the One Million Pibble March On Washington, which had an estimated 4,500 attendees, in an effort to end breed-specific legislation and dog fighting.

In 2017, Corry was one of several female comedians who alleged sexual misconduct by comedian Louis C.K.

=== Career and Stand Up For Pits Foundation, Inc. ===
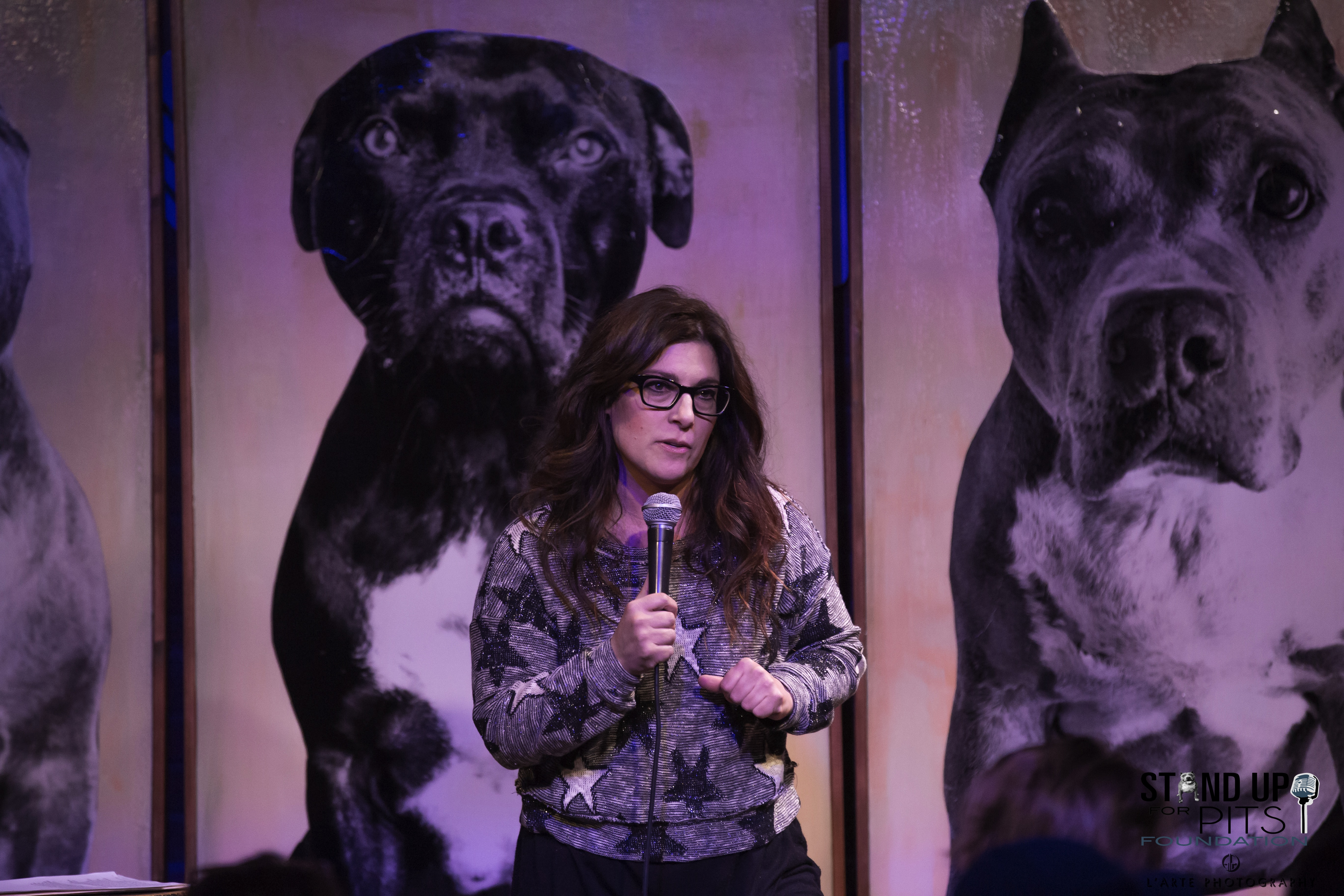
Rebecca Corry performing for Stand Up For Pits at Hollywood Improv

After graduating, she went on to study writing and acting and performed in plays. After ten years in Chicago she moved to Los Angeles and shortly after arriving she was chosen to perform as a "New Face" at the Montreal Comedy Festival. Rebecca has guest starred on several television shows like The King Of Queens, Two Broke Girls and Will & Grace to name a few and played "Astrid Barker" (Paul Giamatti's secretary) in Big Fat Liar. She was a series regular playing "Leisha" on NBC's One Big Happy, executive-produced by Ellen DeGeneres and she has written on, hosted and developed several shows while headlining comedy clubs and venues for over twenty years. She's has a Comedy Central half hour special, performed on Premium Blend and was a cast member of Last Comic Standing 4. Corry is the Founder and Executive Director of the Stand Up For Pits Foundation which is a national nonprofit dedicated to educating, advocating and saving the lives of pit bull "type" dogs. She has been producing and headlining sold out Stand Up For Pits events/shows nationwide for 14 years and is directing and executive producing her first feature-length documentary while working on a new one-woman show. The Stand Up For Pits comedy special Corry produced, directed and performed in is streaming on Amazon Prime, Apple TV, YouTube, Vimeo and more.

== Filmography ==
- Big Fat Liar (2002) as "Astrid Barker", a dog-loving secretary of Marty Wolf
- The Bernie Mac Show (2003)
- The King of Queens (2005)
- Yes Man (2008)
- Comedy Central Presents (2009)
- Rules of Engagement (2010)
- Rizzoli & Isles (2013)
- One Big Happy (2015)
- 2 Broke Girls, "And the '80s Movie" (2016)
- Return Of The Mac (2017)
- Will & Grace (2020)
