= Ty Barnett =

American actor

- Born: Chicago, Illinois, United States
- Occupation: comedian
- Years active: 2002—

Tyrone Barnett (born 1975) is an American actor and stand-up comic.

== Career ==
Barnett made his first television appearance in 2003 on CBS's Star Search He cites Chris Rock and Richard Pryor as major influences.

Ty Barnett was born, raised and attended high school on the south side of Chicago. After high school, he served in the United States Army for six years and was discharged in 1996. He was voted "Up-and-coming Comedian of the Year" in 2002 at the Las Vegas Comedy Festival and named "Outstanding Performer" at Montreal's Just for Laughs Festival. In 2003, he made it to the semi-finals of CBS's Star Search and by 2005 first appeared on CBS's The Late Late Show.

He was featured on Comedy Central Presents and was the 2006 runner-up on the NBC reality show Last Comic Standing. He has appeared on The Tonight Show with Jay Leno, P. Diddy Presents the Bad Boys of Comedy, and in two episodes of 'Til Death. Barnett has also appeared in the feature film Stand Up, as the opening act for Donna Summer, in Premium Blend. He also auditioned for America's Got Talent in 2020 where he was eliminated in the Judge Cuts.
