= Jasper Redd =

American comedian

- Born: June 9, 1979 (age 47)

Jasper Redd (born June 9, 1979) is an American comedian from Knoxville, Tennessee.

Jasper's brand of comedy is distinguished by his use of polyrhythmic timing. Earlier in his career, this was more pronounced. However, he currently is using more traditional cadences to appeal to a wider audience.

With fellow comedian Kimberly Clark, Redd co-hosts the podcast "The Goosedown" on the Maximum Fun network.

He has appeared on Last Call with Carson Daly, Lopez Tonight, Def Comedy Jam, Tosh.0, Jordan, Jesse, Go!, Last Comic Standing, and in the movie National Lampoon's Totally Baked: A Potumentary.

He previously toured nationwide supporting Daniel Tosh on his Tosh Tour Twenty Ten.
