= Mike DeStefano =

American comedian (1966–2011)

- Born: Michael J. DeStefano, Jr. November 29, 1966; The Bronx, New York City, U.S.
- Died: March 6, 2011 (aged 44); Manhattan, New York City, U.S.

Comedy career
- Years active: 2000–2011
- Medium: stand-up

Mike DeStefano (November 29, 1966 – March 6, 2011) was an American stand-up comedian. He used material from his heroin addiction, which began at age 15, and his recovery in brutally honest, profanity-laced routines. He was also a drug counselor to others.

== Career ==
His first gig was in Florida, and that convinced him there was something to live for, and that he had options outside of taking his own life. His second gig was at a Narcotics Anonymous convention in Atlanta, Georgia, where he stepped before the microphone after a rained-out pool party and started ranting about drugs.

A regular at clubs in New York and around the country, DeStefano gained popularity after appearing on television on Comedy Central’s Live at Gotham. He also appeared on Late Night with Conan O'Brien, Showtime's Whiteboyz in the Hood and other radio and television shows, and at popular comedy festivals, most notably US Comedy Arts Festival and Montreal's Just for Laughs festival. In 2010, he competed in the seventh season of NBC's Last Comic Standing and finished in fourth place. He is the comic used in the logo for the New York based restaurant and comedy club The Stand.

On October 9, 2010, DeStefano appeared with Jim Norton, Rich Vos and Robert Kelly in the Comedy Central stand-up special "Comics Anonymous"; all four comedians appearing in the special were former addicts who had been clean and sober for 10 years or more. DeStefano was also an executive producer on the special, which was dedicated to their friend, comedian Greg Giraldo, who had died of a drug overdose in September.

== Personal life ==
DeStefano's wife, Franny, died of AIDS, which he talks about in "The Junkie and the Monk", recorded for The Moth on Jan 23, 2009.

== Death ==
On March 6, 2011, Mike DeStefano died as a result of a heart attack. His death came hours after filming a video for funnyordie.com. DeStefano's funeral was held three days later on March 9 as well as March 10 at the Schuyler Hill Funeral Home in The Bronx.

=== Unfinished projects ===
DeStefano's death came just days before he was scheduled to perform his one-man show, A Cherry Tree in the Bronx, in New York. He had just finished a run of shows titled Drugs, Disease and Death: A Comedy, which was largely based on being HIV positive, his past drug addiction and his wife Fran's death several years earlier after her drug addiction and affliction with AIDS.

== Discography ==
- 2010: OK Karma - released on Stand Up! Records comedy label
