= Josh Blue =

American comedian (born 1978)

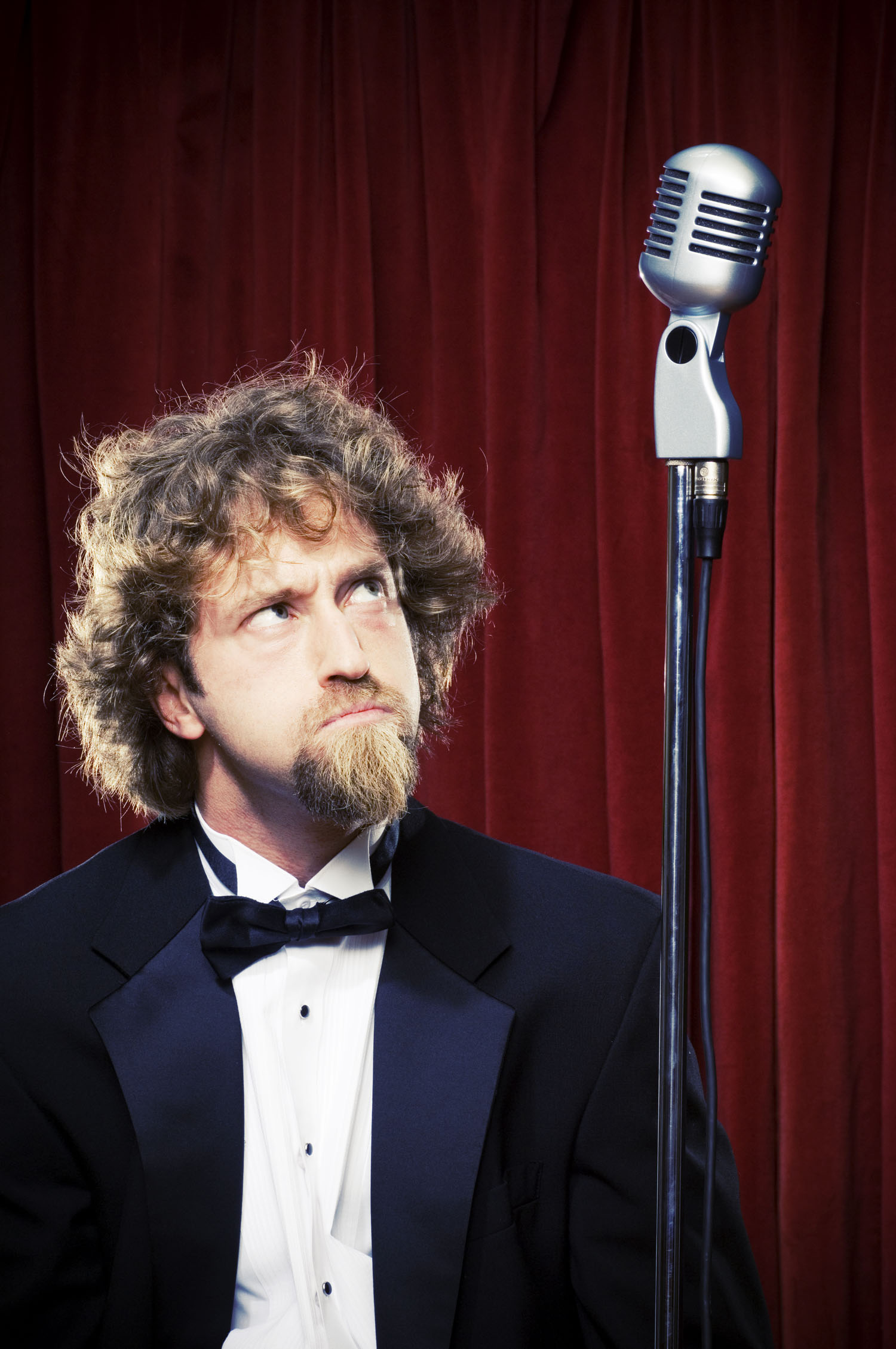
- Blue in 2006
- Born: November 27, 1978 (age 47); Cameroon
- Occupation: Comedian
- Notable work: Last Comic Standing season 4 winner
- Spouse: Yuko Blue (m. 2007; div. 2014)
- Children: 2

Comedy career
- Years active: 2000–present
- Medium: Stand-up, television, film
- Genres: Observational comedy, blue comedy
- Subjects: Self-deprecation, physical disabilities, everyday life
- Website: joshblue.com

Josh Blue (born November 27, 1978) is an American comedian. He was voted the Last Comic Standing on NBC's reality show Last Comic Standing during its fourth season, which aired May–August 2006. Blue has cerebral palsy, and much of his self-deprecating humor is centered on this.

== Early life ==
Blue was born in Cameroon where his father, Walter Blue, was a professor of Romance languages at Hamline University teaching during a mission. Blue grew up in Saint Paul, Minnesota, and graduated from Como Park Senior High School in 1997. He began his career as a comedian while seeking a creative writing degree at The Evergreen State College.

During college, he went back to Africa to volunteer as an intern at Parc de Hahn, a zoo in Senegal. At one point for a joke on a busy weekend, Josh locked himself in an empty animal exhibit for eight hours. A bewildered crowd threw him bananas and peanuts anyway, to which Josh quips, "that was the best day I ate in Senegal!"

== Career ==
Blue got his start in comedy doing open mic sets while attending The Evergreen State College. Audiences reacted enthusiastically to his self-deprecating humor, and Blue started making a name for himself on the comedy circuit. In 2002, he won the prestigious Comedy Works New Faces contest. He has appeared several times on Comedy Central's Mind of Mencia. Blue won $10,000 for finishing in first place at 2004 Las Vegas Comedy Festival's 2004 Royal Flush Comedy Competition.

After winning the 2006 season of NBC's reality show Last Comic Standing, he was the first comedian to do stand-up on The Ellen DeGeneres Show. His other television credits include Live with Regis and Kelly, Comics Unleashed, plus numerous appearances on Fox, CBS, ABC, and MSNBC.

He appeared in the 2009 low-budget horror film Feast III: The Happy Finish.

Blue appeared in Boulder band Rose Hill Drive's music video "The Psychoanalyst".

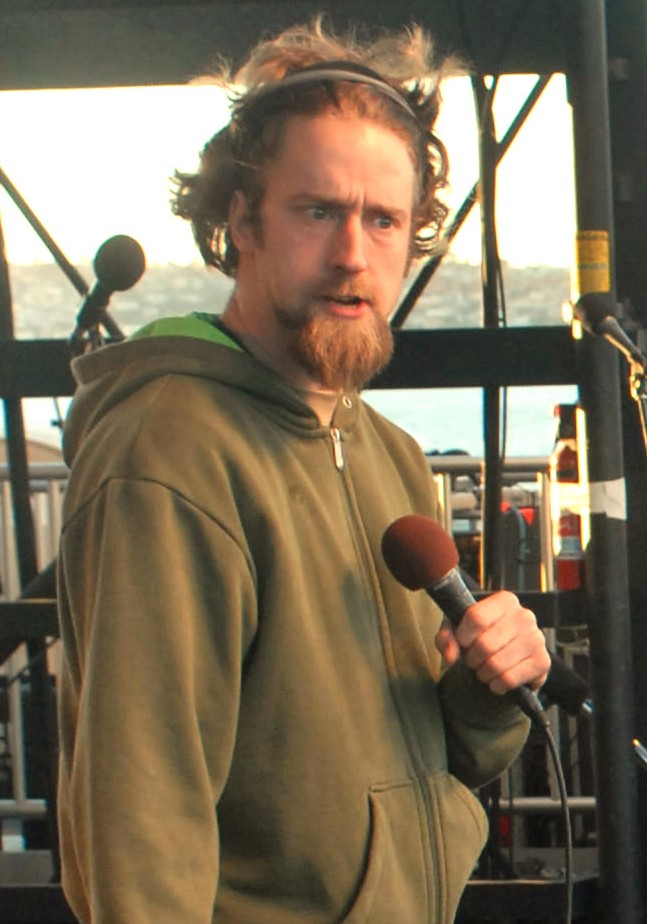
Blue at a USO-sponsored holiday concert, 2006

Blue was voted the 11th best comedian by viewers in Comedy Central's Stand-up Comedy Showdown 2011.

He appeared in Ron White's Las Vegas Salute to the Troops 2013 as part of the opening act.

Blue also appeared in the sports based comedy 108 Stitches in 2014.

In 2021, Blue auditioned for season sixteen of America's Got Talent, where he got four yeses from the judges and was able to advance through the live rounds. Blue placed third in the season, behind aerialist Aidan Bryant and magician Dustin Tavella.

In 2023, Blue appeared on America's Got Talent: All-Stars. In his round of the preliminaries, he placed third behind former winners Brandon Leake and Kodi Lee.

== Personal life ==
Blue currently resides in Denver, Colorado, with his two children: a son, Simon, and a daughter, Saika.

He also creates and sells sculptures and paintings.

Like his father and siblings, Josh Blue is multilingual. Blue's father Walter Blue speaks 13 languages and Josh and his siblings all speak at least 3 languages. In addition to English, Blue speaks French and Wolof fluently.

Blue has cerebral palsy, specifically classified as spastic hemiplegic cerebral palsy, and many of his jokes center on living with his disability, how he deals with it, and how other people view him. Blue appeared on Last Comic Standing to "make people aware of the fact that people with disabilities can make an impact." He coined the term "palsy punch" during his final set of the final round of the show, when he said that the palsy punch is effective in a fight because "first of all, they don't know where the punch is coming from, and second of all, neither do I." One of Blue's competitors said he has "an unreasonable amount of likability" while another of his competitors said "he is just a good guy". Blue also joked that signing an autograph takes 45 minutes and that to write down his phone number he has to find a "big ol' stack of paper."

Blue has competed in Paralympic seven-a-side soccer; he was a part of the United States national team roster during the 2004 Summer Paralympics in Athens, Greece.

== Works ==
=== Comedy specials ===
| Year | Title |
|---|---|
| 2006 | 7 More Days in the Tank |
| 2012 | Sticky Change |
| 2016 | Delete |
| 2020 | Broccoli |
| 2024 | Freak Accident |

=== Discography ===
| Year | Title |
|---|---|
| 2008 | Good Josh, Bad Arm |
| 2012 | Hooligan Stew |

== See also ==
- Steady Eddy – (born Christopher Widdows 1968), Australian comedian with cerebral palsy
- Geri Jewell – (born 1956), American stand-up comedian and actress with cerebral palsy
- Rosie Jones – (born 1990), British comedian with cerebral palsy
- Lee Ridley – (born 1980), British comedian with cerebral palsy
