= Theo Von =

American comedian and podcaster (born 1980)

- Born: Theodor Capitani von Kurnatowski III; March 19, 1980 (age 46); Covington, Louisiana, U.S.
- Education: University of New Orleans (BA)

Comedy career
- Years active: 2000–present
- Medium: Stand-up; podcast; television; film
- Genres: Observational comedy; surreal humor
- Subjects: American politics; human behavior; human sexuality

Theodor Capitani von Kurnatowski III (born March 19, 1980), known professionally as Theo Von, is an American stand-up comedian and podcaster. He is the host of This Past Weekend podcast and has appeared on various MTV and Comedy Central shows.

== Early life and education ==
Von was born on March 19, 1980, in Covington, Louisiana, to Gina Capitani and Roland Theodor Achilles von Kurnatowski (1912–1996). His mother was born and raised in Wyoming, Illinois, where Von spent part of his childhood. His father was a native of Bluefields, Nicaragua, who later settled in New Orleans. His grandfather was a Polish missionary who settled in Cabo Gracias a Dios; he is descended from the Kurnatowski szlachta, a noble family in Poland.

Von's father was 67 when Von was born. His father died of cancer in 1996 when Von was 16. He grew up in Covington with his older brother and two younger sisters and was legally emancipated at 14. He grew up in circumstances he describes as "low-income", stating that most of his "frame of reference" came from "poor people".

Von later moved to Mandeville, Louisiana, and graduated from Mandeville High School. He attended Louisiana State University where he wrote for The Reveille. He also attended the Loyola University New Orleans, University of Arizona, College of Charleston, and Santa Monica College. Von received his undergraduate degree in Urban Planning in 2011 from the University of New Orleans.

== Television career ==
Von appeared on MTV's Road Rules: Maximum Velocity Tour in 2000 at age nineteen. He auditioned for the show at an open casting call for The Real World and Road Rules at a bar while studying at Louisiana State University. Von faced controversy on the show for his views, including stating in the casting special that he was against interracial dating, an opinion he defended to the LSU newspaper after the show aired.

Von was on four seasons of MTV's reality game show The Challenge (formerly known as Real World/Road Rules Challenge), a combined spinoff of MTV's The Real World and Road Rules. He was a part of the cast of Battle of the Seasons (2002), The Gauntlet (2003–2004), Battle of the Sexes II (2004–2005), and Fresh Meat (2006). Von was runner-up in 2002, and was the winner of the following two seasons.

In 2006, Von competed on season 4 of Last Comic Standing, not making it to the main finals, but winning the companion online competition Last Comic Downloaded.

In mid-2008, Von was a member of the Comedy Central sketch/competition show Reality Bites Back. He won the show, beating fellow comedians, including Amy Schumer, Bert Kreischer, and Tiffany Haddish.

Beginning in 2011, Von took over as host of the Yahoo! online TV recap show Primetime in No Time. He hosted the TBS hidden camera show Deal With It (executive produced by Howie Mandel) for its run of three seasons (2013–2014). During this period, Von began appearing in cameo acting roles on select television shows, including Inside Amy Schumer and Why? with Hannibal Buress. He has said that he was not more interested in acting earlier on — despite having opportunities to do pilots and sitcoms — because he was not very enthused about the projects offered at the time and because they often conflicted with his touring and podcasting schedules.

In the spring of 2018, Von's three-episode scripted comedy show Man Up was released on Comedy Central, in which he attempted to improve the 'spiraling' lives of male comics. In August 2019, Von announced that he had been cast in the big-budget film The Tomorrow War (at the time known as Ghost Draft), and had been recruited for the project by its lead actor, Chris Pratt; a few weeks later, Von announced on his podcast that he had dropped out of the movie due to the time commitment required.

== Stand-up comedy ==
Von began performing stand-up comedy in Louisiana. At age 23, after his tenure on MTV, he decided to move to Los Angeles and professionally pursue a career in comedy. According to Von, he had difficulty as an entertainer in Hollywood, as talent agents viewed him as a former reality TV star and were thus skeptical about giving him work as a comedian. He has since related that it has taken years to shake this image and establish himself as a comedian.

Von released his first Netflix stand-up special, No Offense, in 2016. His second Netflix special, Regular People, was released in 2021. In addition to his recorded specials, Von has conducted multiple national stand-up tours, including the Dark Arts Tour (2019) and Return of the Rat Tour (2021–present).

== Podcasting ==
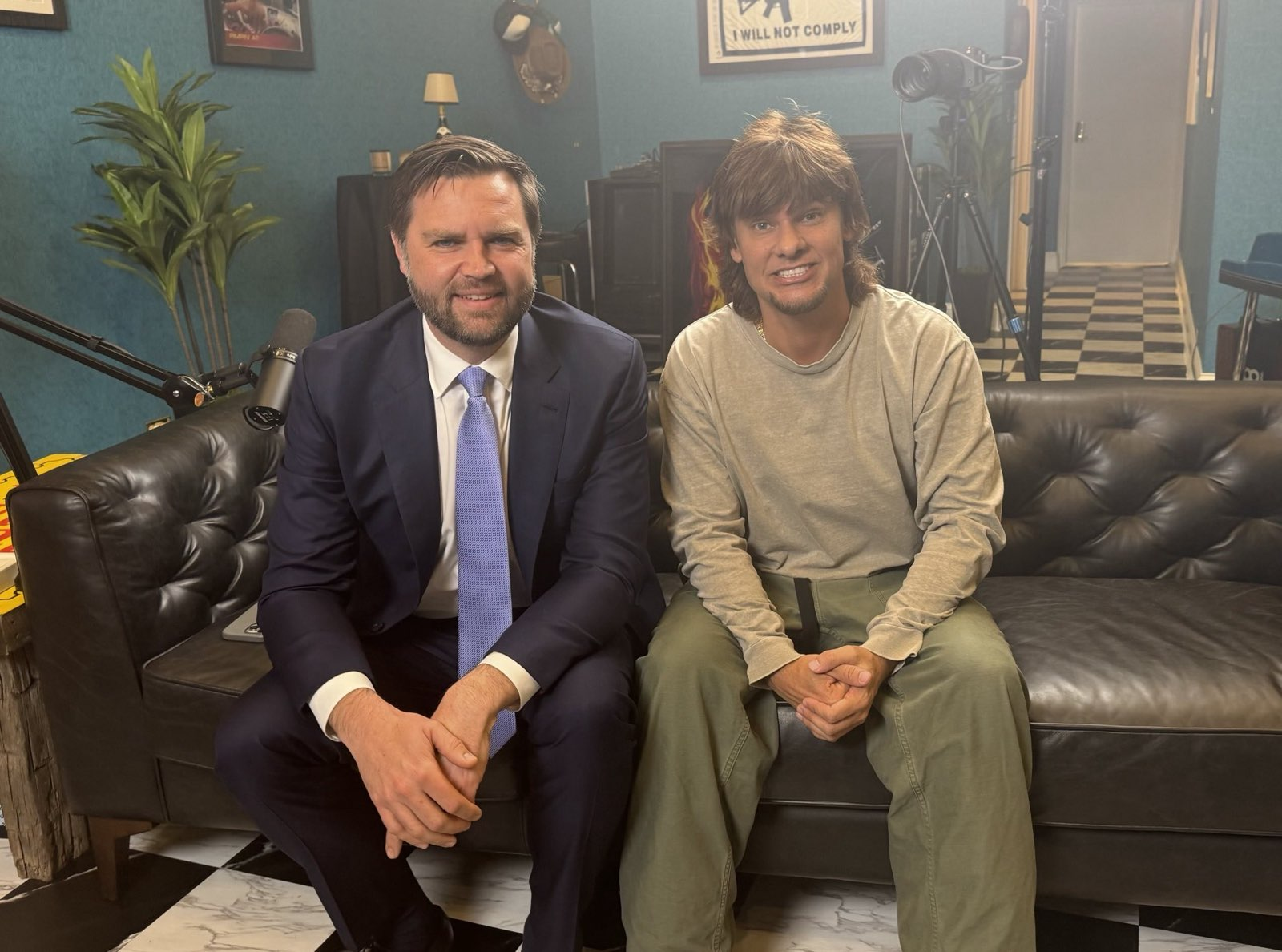
Von with vice president JD Vance in June 2025

In April 2011, Von began his first podcast, The Comedy Sideshow. Taped at the Improv Comedy Club in Hollywood, Von interviewed comedians and other entertainers. The show had 23 episodes, the last of which premiered in November of that year.

In 2015, Von started a weekly podcast with filmmaker and journalist Matthew Cole Weiss called Allegedly with Theo Von & Matthew Cole Weiss. The two friends, whose styles and presentation contrasted, competed to see who had better "alleged" tales of celebrities, hilarity, trauma, dating, success, and failure from their years living in Hollywood. The podcast lasted three years and had a total of 123 episodes.

Since 2016, Von has hosted the podcast This Past Weekend, a podcast featuring long-form interviews and discussions. According to Spotify's 2025 Wrapped rankings, This Past Weekend was the second most-streamed podcast in the United States on Spotify during 2025, behind The Joe Rogan Experience.

He has been a recurring guest on many comedians' podcasts, including The Joe Rogan Experience, Joey Diaz's The Church of What's Happening Now, The Fighter and the Kid, Bobby Lee's TigerBelly, and The Adam Carolla Show. In 2024, Spotify announced that This Past Weekend w/ Theo Von was the 4th biggest podcast on their platform globally.

In December 2018, Von and fellow podcaster/comedian Brendan Schaub started a podcast called King and The Sting. At the podcast's release, it debuted at number 1 on the iTunes Podcast charts in the US and also reached the top charts in the United Kingdom, Canada, Spain, and Australia.

In January 2022, Schaub and Von added a third host, Chris D'Elia, to King and The Sting, renaming it King and The Sting and Wing. During this time Von began taking breaks from the podcast, allowing guest hosts to fill in. On November 4, 2022, King and The Sting and Wing was officially renamed The Golden Hour, with Workaholics actor Erik Griffin replacing Von.

In September 2023, Von publicly accused Kast Media and its CEO Colin Thomson of non-payment, after pro wrestling personality and podcaster Jim Cornette had made similar claims about Kast and Thomson in July. Corresponding accusations were also made by Jason Ellis, Brendan Schaub, Bryan Callen, Whitney Cummings, and Alyx Weiss, each of whom stated they were owed money by Kast Media, including several six-figure and seven-figure shortages. It was reported that Kast Media was in the process of being acquired by PodcastOne and that in lieu of full payment, Thomson offered creators partial compensation combined with stock options. Amid the news, LiveOne and PodcastOne stock dropped considerably and the company no longer planned to officially hire Thomson.

In July 2025, Von was named to Time magazine's inaugural "TIME100 Creators" list - the publication's roster of the 100 most influential digital voices - appearing in the "Leaders" category for his podcast This Past Weekend.

== Personal life ==
Von has lived in Nashville, Tennessee, since September 2020, after purchasing the home of former Vanderbilt coach Derek Mason. Von had an older half-brother, Roland von Kurnatowski Jr., whom he never had any connection with, who owned Tipitina's and founded the Tipitina's Foundation; he died in 2019 after an accidental shooting, aged 68. Von also has one older brother who is two years his senior, two younger sisters and an older half-sister who is in real estate.

== In media ==
=== Comedy specials and albums ===
- No Offense (Netflix, 2016)
- Musket Fire: Early Years of Satire (2017 album)
- 30lb Bag of Hamster Bones (2017 album) - on March 6 it placed #1 on the iTunes Comedy Album charts and #4 on Billboard.
- Regular People (Netflix, 2021)
- I'm Doing Fine (Netflix, 2026)

=== Podcasts ===
- The Comedy Sideshow (2011)
- Allegedly with Theo Von & Matthew Cole Weiss (2015–2018)
- This Past Weekend (2016–present)
- King and The Sting (and Wing) (with Brendan Schaub (2018–2022)

=== Filmography ===
As himself
Year	Title	Notes
2000	Road Rules: Maximum Velocity Tour	Contestant
2002	Real World/Road Rules Challenge: Battle of the Seasons	Contestant
2003–04	Real World/Road Rules Challenge: The Gauntlet	Contestant
2004–05	Real World/Road Rules Challenge: Battle of the Sexes 2	Contestant
2005	Battle of the Network Reality Stars	Contestant
2006	Real World/Road Rules Challenge: Fresh Meat	Contestant
2006	Last Comic Standing	Won the title of "Last Comic Downloaded" (most downloads for online clips)
2008	America's Prom Queen	Panelist
2008	Live at Gotham	Season 3
2008	Reality Bites Back	Contestant
2012–14	Primetime in No Time	Host; replaced former host Frank Nicotero
2012	The Half Hour	
2013–14	Deal With It	Host
2016	Acting Out	Himself
2017	The Joe Rogan Experience #925	Guest
2018	The Joe Rogan Experience #1118	Guest
2018	The Joe Rogan Experience #1141	Guest
2019	Hot Ones	Guest
2019	Impaulsive	Guest
2019	The Joe Rogan Experience #1225	Guest
2019	Kill Tony #423	Guest
2021	The Joe Rogan Experience #1731	Guest
2022	The Joe Rogan Experience #1847	Guest
2022	Kill Tony #569	Guest
2023	Full Send Podcast	Guest
2023	The Joe Rogan Experience #1994	Guest
2023	Kill Tony #615	Guest
2024	Get Down with Sean and Marley #17	Guest
2024	The Joe Rogan Experience #2226	Guest
2025	The Joe Rogan Experience #2253	Guest
2026	The Joe Rogan Experience #2478	Guest

Acting
Year	Title	Role	Notes
2013	InAPPropriate Comedy	Mountain Climber	Film
2013	Inside Amy Schumer	Director	Episode: "A Porn Star Is Born"
2015	Why? with Hannibal Buress	Alex	
2024	Sweet Dreams	Garvey	Film
2026	Busboys		Lead role, writer, producer
