= Comedy Central Presents =

Stand-up comedy television series

- Season 14 opening title sequence
- Genre: Stand-up comedy
- Created by: Paul Miller
- Theme music composer: Sugarcuts, Inc. Theme (2004–present); Craig Sharmat Black Toast Music (1998–2004)
- Country of origin: United States
- Original language: English
- No. of seasons: 15
- No. of episodes: 283 (list of episodes)

Production
- Executive producers: Kimber Rickabaugh; Paul Miller
- Production locations: Gerald W. Lynch Theater; (Season 14–present), Hudson Theatre; New York City (Seasons 2–13); Los Angeles (Season 1)
- Running time: 23 minutes
- Production companies: RickMill Productions; Comedy Partners

Original release
- Network: Comedy Central
- Release: December 1, 1998 – March 25, 2011

Related
- Comedy Central Stand-Up Presents

Comedy Central Presents is an American stand-up comedy television series created for Comedy Central. It is the network's main half-hour program which highlights either one or a series of stand-up comedians each episode. In 2011, the series ended and Comedy Central replaced it with the revamped The Half Hour, now called Comedy Central Stand-Up Presents, a series of 30-minute stand-up specials.

== DVDs ==
Starting in 2008, Comedy Central started releasing "Best of" compilation DVDs, with uncensored audio. Previously, some of these episodes have appeared on DVDs of comedians' stand-up specials, only they remained censored.

=== The Best of Comedy Central Presents: Uncensored ===
This DVD was released on February 5, 2008. On this DVD, only the audio was uncensored. There is one moment in Dane Cook's special when he gives the finger, which was blurred on television, that remains blurred.

The shows featured on this DVD are:

- Lewis Black (2002) (3rd special)
- Dane Cook (2000)
- Jeff Dunham (2003)
- Jim Gaffigan (2000)
- Mitch Hedberg (1999)
- Demetri Martin (2004)
- Carlos Mencia (2002)
- Brian Regan (2000)

=== The Best of Comedy Central Presents: Uncensored II ===
This DVD was released on August 26, 2008. Unlike the first DVD, this DVD removes all of the commercial bumper titles and isolates the credits of each show. The shows featured on this DVD are:

- Dave Attell (1999)
- Mike Birbiglia (2004) (1st special)
- Frank Caliendo (2004)
- Zach Galifianakis (2001)
- Stephen Lynch (2008) (2nd special)
- Patton Oswalt (1999)
- Nick Swardson (2006) (2nd special, although the picture of him on the back cover was from his 1st special)
- Daniel Tosh (2002)
