= Probably Science =

Science and comedy podcast

- Genre: Comedy, science
- Language: English

Cast and voices
- Hosted by: Andy Wood; Matt Kirshen; Jesse Case

Publication
- Original release: January 21, 2012

Related
- Website: www.probablyscience.com

Probably Science is a weekly comedy and science podcast which first aired on January 21, 2012. The show is co-hosted by Andy Wood, Matt Kirshen, and Jesse Case. Former co-host and founding member Brooks Wheelan left the show in 2013 for personal reasons and has since returned as a guest. In Wheelan's absence, Case, previously a guest, was brought on as a co-host.

The podcast focuses on current scientific news. Occasionally it explores different facets of relevant media, including the host's comedy careers, as well as the large array of careers and hobbies held by the guests.

A wide range of guest have appeared in their episodes, including astronaut Chris Hadfield, astrophysicist Neil deGrasse Tyson, comedian Chris Hardwick, Sean M. Carroll (a research professor in the Department of Physics at the California Institute of Technology), and two appearances from Doctor Who and Guardians of the Galaxy actress Karen Gillan.

== SPATS ==
In episode 514, released on Nov. 27th, 2023, the podcast team introduced the SPATS. The concept is similar to the EGOT and is an honor for actors who have operated or traveled on a ship, plane, automobile, train, and spaceship in their films.

== Episodes ==
Ep#	Guests	Topics	Airdate
1	None	Turing test, Seals and kangaroos, & Did Columbus's arrival cool the Earth	24 January 2012
2	Nick Rutherford	Favorite dinosaurs, Predicting gang violence with math, & Fake Mars missions in Russian parking garages	25 January 2012
3	Mike Burns	iPhone anger, secret government aliens, & Spontaneously obese monkeys	26 January 2012
4	Barry Rothbart	Shooting nudist colony videos, World's lightest substance, & Extraterrestrial real estate	1 February 2012
5	None	Horror movie bird flu, Russian scientists disappear searching for prehistoric lake, & are the Japanese whaling addicts	6 February 2012
6	Johnny Pemberton	Subliminal science projects, Using monkeys to measure radiation, & Using monkeys to measure radiation	9 February 2012
7	Kyle Kinane	Sexy snakes, C. Everett Koop dissecting cats, & Human hypersleep	13 February 2012
8	April Richardson	Does booze makes you smarter, Should all scientists just work on cancer, & Swiss space janitors	20 February 2012
9	Brody Stevens	The government's “Avatar” ripoff, Resurrecting a 30,000-year-old plant, & Vegan dogs	26 February 2012
10	Jesse Case	Breakups, Asteroids ending the world in 28 years, & Solving our energy crisis with poop	5 March 2012
11	Howard Kremer	Jim Cameron's adventures under the sea, Solar Flares, & The Clap	12 March 2012
12	Auggie Smith	Guiding lightning with lasers, Babies are smarter than computers, & Isaac Newton's apocalyptic predictions	18 March 2012
13	Chris Franjola	Figuring out why shock therapy works, Why hasn't the Segway conquered the world, & Using lasers to see around corners	26 March 2012
14	Paul Jay	Armchair astronomy, Vibrating tattoos, & Growing new body parts	2 April 2012
15	Dave Holmes	Do antibiotics cause weight gain, Could bacteria cause OCD, & Dolphin gangs	8 April 2012
16	Alonzo Bodden	600 mile-per-hour tape, The first use of fire, & Space elevators	18 April 2012
17	James Adomian	Skeletons in hot air balloons, Particles that are their own antiparticles, & Giant sharks	23 April 2012
18	Jackie Kashian	Stalactites vs. stalagmites, Birds with GPS neurons, & Are we scaring sharks away from their reefs	30 April 2012
19	Justin Ian Daniels	The Supermoon, Vibrating suits for Olympians, & Super-fast wi-fi with common laser pointers	7 May 2012
20	Blaine Capatch	The Yellowstone supervolcano, Revisiting the airborne version of bird flu, & Venus goes in front of the Sun	14 May 2012
21	Eddie Ifft	Global warming denial campaigns, Mormon-backed niceness initiatives, & Re-routing apocalypse asteroids with pebbles	21 May 2012 (Live)
22	Duncan Trussell	Tarot card Rorschach tests, Lunar landing conspiracy theories, & Preparing to break the free-fall world record	28 May 2012
23	Jason Nash	The science of superheroes, Private spaceflight, & The eclipse	4 June 2012
24	Eliza Skinner	The Patriot missile test launches, Hands-on science museums, & Why can't you use your phone on a plane	11 June 2012
25	Tony Sam	Protecting the ocean surrounding Australia, Speech-learning robots, & Colonizing Mars	18 June 2012
26	Bil Dwyer	News	25 June 2012
27	Jordan Morris	The world's biggest crocodile, Male contraceptives, & Rock-scissors-paper robots	2 July 2012
28	Moshe Kasher	The proliferation of Genghis Khan DNA, Saving baby beluga whales, & Preventing hearing loss with AMPK proteins	9 July 2012
29	Nick Turner	Robots that walk like humans, Neurological wiring predicting chronic pain, Mayan apocalypse	15 July 2012
30	Steve Agee	The dark side of cornstarch, Non-Newtonian bullet-proof vests, & Building a jellyfish out of rat hearts	23 July 2012
31	Robert Buscemi	Measuring a river's meander, Is impersonating a beekeeper a crime, & What's an aquifer	29 July 2012
32	Guy Branum	Rural sociology, Wasting a law degree, & Calling out Guns, Germs and Steel	6 August 2012
33	Kira Soltanovich	Shift workers at risk for heart attacks, Auto-erotic self-asphyxiation, & Bodily changes brought on by pregnancy	13 August 2012
34	Julian McCullough	Denmark's penal system, "Green" cremation, & Endangered sharks	20 August 2012
35	Baron Vaughn	Ways to straighten teeth, Super-fertility causing miscarriage, & Bill Nye stands up to creationists	27 August 2012
36	Shane Mauss	Evolutionary psychology & The science refuting Todd Akin's mind-bogglingly stupid statement about rape and pregnancy	3 September 2012
37	Power Violence	Hurricane preparedness, Setting your house on fire, & Voyager I reaching the edge of the Solar System	10 September 2012
38	Mark Agee	King Tut's girlish figure, John Wayne Gacy's head injury, & evolutionary explanation of the placebo effect	17 September 2012
39	Andy Haynes	Vegetarianism, Dead baby pandas, & figuring out what a harvest moon is	24 September 2012
40	Hampton Yount	Formally lost episode from December 2011	1 October 2012
41	Richard Bain	Insects with mechanical brains, Hiring a green exterminator, & Bees that make blue and green honey	8 October 2012
42	Emery Emery	The origin of Probably Science, Cheating yo-yos with mechanical clutches, & Trusting expertise	14 October 2012
43	Josh Cheney and Dax Jordan	Celery-based science fair projects, Felix Baumgartner's record-setting jump, & How long would it take for something to fall to the center of the Earth	22 October 2012
44	Chip Pope	Decoding the oldest-known writing system, The Wachowski siblings, & Hermit crab key parties	29 October 2012
45	Mike Siegel	Felix Baumgartner is anti-space exploration, Self-fixing concrete, & Red Bull Flugtag mishaps	5 November 2012
46	Taylor Williamson	Acid rain experiments, Math anxiety creates actual pain, & High school Republicanism	12 November 2012
47	TJ Miller	Growing your own balsa wood, Congressmen who don't believe in evolution, & A wandering planet	19 November 2012
48	Marianne Sierk	The OCD nature of religion, Insects with giant testicles, & The lack of women in science jobs depicted in TV and movies	26 November 2012
49	Tom Sibley	Robotic snakes, Vernor's Herzog, & Ice on Mercury	3 December 2012
50	Kyle Kinane	Peeing in the shower, The cotton gin, & Young Einstein	10 December 2012
51	Troy Conrad	Improvised debate, House/career dysmorphia, & Hot tub clothing regulations	17 December 2012
bonus episode	Jesse Case	World War II bunker dogs, hospice situations, & home videos from the 1980s	31 December 2012
PH 1	Jesse Case	Probably History: Christmas	11 January 2013
52	Dan Telfer	the NASA mohawk guy, Making origami cranes as astronaut training, & Shoulder hair	14 January 2013
53	Wil Anderson	Climate change denial, Karl Kruszelnicki's study of belly button fluff, & Being laughed at vs. being laughed with	21 January 2013
54	Laura House	Chili competitions, Drinking and guns, & Shooting pesky mink	30 January 2013
55	Dr. Peter McGraw and Baron Vaughn	special episode devoted entirely to the science of why things are funny	4 February 2013
56	David Huntsberger	The importance of giant prime numbers, The loneliness of Google Street View team members, & The uselessness of Yelp reviews	11 February 2013
57	Michael James Nelson and Robert Buscemi	Fox News and their assessment of the value of space water, Drilling into the surface of Mars, & Space cats	18 February 2013
58	Jeff Klinger	Malfunctioning Segways, Expensive anatomical models, & Figuring out when man's anscestors developed a tolerance for booze	
PH 2	Mark Agee	Probably History: life in first-century Rome	28 February 2013
59	Mike Schmidt	The cured AIDS baby, Visiting a spice farm, & Harry Potter vs. Twilight	5 March 2013
60	Glenn Wool and Lady Carol	Does bee venom kill HIV, Caffeine-addicted bees, & Mummies with heart conditions	12 March 2013
61	Chris Hardwick	Using iPhones to detect intestinal worms, A new way to keep livers alive for transplantation, & Hobo sapiens	19 March 2013
62	Matt Braunger	Comedians in therapy, Birds evolving shorter wings to escape cars, & Overfishing breeding smaller fish	26 March 2013
63	Aparna Nancherla	Magnet schools, Retrieving rockets from the ocean floor, & Unearthing plague pits	2 April 2013
64	Cameron Esposito and River Butcher	Why spittoons make a dinging noise, Daft Punk and Cyberdyne Systems, & Cockney rhyming slang	9 April 2013
65	The Sklar Brothers	The latest bird flu scare, Spending $100 million to lasso an asteroid, & Using kidney bean leaves to trap bedbugs	16 April 2013
66	Peter Serafinowicz and Gallagher	Live at the Bridgetown Comedy Festival.	23 April 2013
67	Karen Kilgariff and April Richardson	Quantum physics and Ramtha, Cheesy potatoes, & First aid book illustrations	30 April 2013
68	Celia Pacquola and TJ Chambers	Arizona State's party reputation, Nonsensical drinking age laws, & Mainlining oxygen	7 May 2013
69	John Roy	Daft Punk's new album, water slides and skydiving, & 480,000,000 needles in space	14 May 2013
70	Crystal Dilworth and Alexandra Lockwood	Dancers moonlighting as scientists, the myth of Tryptophan, & penguins getting knighted in Denmark	22 May 2013
PH 3	Pat Reilly	Probably History: The Borgias	28 May 2013
71	Rory Scovel	The secret lives of parents, saving a baby with a 3D printer, & playing guitar while getting brain surgery	4 June 2013
72	Brooks Wheelan	A Probably Science ripoff, woolly mammoth blood, & light shows with microwaved grapes	11 June 2013
73	Janna Levin	Black holes orbiting in three-leaf clovers, the Large Hadron Collider: nothing to worry about, & Einstein's explanation of Mercury's odd orbit	19 June 2013
74	David Angelo	The effects of light and darkness on cabbage, curing cancer, & traveling to Mars via nuclear propulsion	26 June 2013
75	Dr. James Kakalios, Tommy Ryman, and Dan Schlissel	Live from Convergence Con: telescopic eyes, how to transport science on a boat, & superconductors	6 July 2013
76	Colleen Watson and Charlene Conley	Married guys have less AIDS, making igloos, & marrying buildings	16 July 2013
77	Virginia Jones and Auggie Smith	A blue planet that rains glass, controlling stem cells with magnets, & a new Neptune moon	22 July 2013
78	Dr. Sean Carroll	The fixed density of dark energy, we are the creamy tendrils in a universal cup of coffee, & the arrow of time	28 July 2013
79	Hank and Chris Thompson	Sibling rivalry, taxi drivers' enlarge hippocampi, & inheriting the chess team captain crown	6 August 2013
Summer Bonus Episode	Dr. Richard Flower, Dr. Anna Collu, and Jeff and Emily Mounts	"Keep your standards low and enjoy!"	13 August 2013
80	Nick Doody	No Subject	1 September 2013
81	Humphrey Ker and Bryan Cook	The hilarious Competitive Erotic Fan Fiction show, asylum movies, & the curse of having a posh accent	10 September 2013
82	Kathleen Ritterbush	Falling for the testicle-biting fish hoax, how fossils form, & thinking dinosaurs and humans coexisted	17 September 2013
83	David Epstein and Paul Morrissey	The genetics of wanting to train hard, the link between elite athletes and ADHD, & Major League hitters who can't touch a 60 mph softball	24 September 2013
84	Keith Malley and Chemda aka Keith and the Girl	Estranged parents, having an intern clean the DNA off of your keyboard, & the government shutdown	2 October 2013
85	Rhys Darby and Brandon Fibbs	Live from the LA PodFest: Space sex, harvesting Helium-3 from the Moon, and the intricacies of the Welsh language	9 October 2013
86	Karen Gillan	Growing up as a Scottish serf, criticizing the physics of the movie Gravity, and fruit bat fellatio	16 October 2013
87	Nate Craig	Flushing out brain toxins while you sleep, rapidly aging breast tissue, & a possible cure for baldness	22 October 2013
88	Brendon Burns	Whatever killed the non-avian dinosaurs wiped out a load of bees, Perthans, and finding bombs with dolphin-inspired radar	29 October 2013
89	Dr. Larry Price and Dr. Jamie Rollins	Gravity waves and what LIGO actually is, why we don't go straight through tables, & how to measure something that's smaller than the smallest thing you can think of	5 November 2013
90	Scotty Landes and Heather Thomson	Professional hugging, animals doing math, & the science of Captchas	12 November 2013
91	Samm Levine and Susan Burke	Hotel living, the perks of priesthood, & using levitating droplets of water to create nanoparticles	19 November 2013
92	Andi Osho	Dogs reacting to the directions of fellow dogs' tail wags, the speed of gravity waves, & the gray area of children's photos	25 November 2013
93	Jason John Whitehead	Birthright trips to Israel, Jesse's Typewriter collection, & goosing	3 December 2013
94	Daniel Sloss	Scottish pride, Everyone's fingers connect, & adolescent mice that drink alcohol because of peer pressure	10 December 2013
95	Dr. Ainissa Ramirez and Sarah Tiana	A new style of safer tackling, Waffle House waiters who are like quarterbacks, & the reasons for the Michigan/Ohio state rivalry	17 December 2013
96	Lee Billings and Dr. Bjoern Benneke	The Drake equation, Earth's recent trend toward radio silence, & energy-hungry alien civilizations creating Dyson spheres	26 December 2013
97	Emily Heller and Auggie Smith	Making belly button cheese, the polar vortex, & doing comedy for a glass company	8 January 2014
98	Dr. Peter McGraw and Caleb Bacon	Peter McGraw: Wanted dead or alive, the comedy terrorist, & humor in Auschwit	14 January 2014
99	Dwayne Perkins	The lone woman of San Nicolas Island, dying carnivores changing the courses of rivers, & composing a song based on auditory hallucinations	21 January 2014
100	Karen Gillan and Brooks Wheelan	The excommunication of Halley's Comet, dipping blood cells in acid to make stem cells, & non-hormonal, reversible, cheap male birth control	31 January 2014
101	Graham Elwood	Suing NASA for not looking hard enough into aliens, marijuana lowering suicide rates, & Bill Nye debating a creationist	4 February 2014
102	Professor Matthew Walker, Kurt Braunohler, and Daniel Van Kirk	Live from SF Sketchfest	12 February 2014
103	Wendy Wason	How John Wayne Gacy got caught, Matt's serial killer neighbor, & a computer-generated math proof that's bigger than all of Wikipedia	19 February 2014
104	Andrew Solmssen	The illusion of digital privacy, looking at clips of severe Russian accidents as a profession, & the discovery of a 4.4 billion-year-old crystal	25 February 2014
105	James Bachman and Danny Lobell	Having a Jewish-themed wedding, a recently unearthed 30,000-year-old megavirus, & a 3D-printed electronic glove for you heart	4 March 2014
106	Jimmy Shubert and Matt Davis	Rubbing strange lamps you find at the beach, baby tumors that have teeth, & another AIDS baby who's been cured	10 March 2014
107	Stefan Pop & Rylee Newton	HP Lovecraft movies, A more in-depth look at the drug Narcan, & The Netherlands' speed skating dominance	18 March 2014
108	Drs. Larry Price, Jamie Rollins & Janna Levin	The Big Bang, what Inflation means & what this BICEP2 experiment did	27 March 2014
109	Tara Flynn	Saving the government $400 million by changing fonts, Ink cartels, & Debunking St. Patrick	1 April 2014
110	Beth Donahue	Taking four-hour acid, The truth about the stem cell acid bath story, & The possibility of a topical fat-burning cream	8 April 2014
111	Cara Santa Maria	The Cosmos reboot, Bath salts: They don't actually make you hungry for faces, & A Cornell grad students letting a bee sting every part of his body	14 April 2014
112	Bryan Bishop	Jumprope failures as cancer symptoms, Going through chemo and radiation therapy while planning your wedding, & Getting (and giving) horrible news	22 April 2014
113	Auggie Smith	Reinventing the axe, A study that reveals the best way for men to dance, & Being goofy-footed	29 April 2014
114	None	Hitler's disabilities, Stephen Hawking's worries, & Building pyramids	7 May 2014
115	Paul Provenza & Amber Case	Live from Bridgetown Comedy Festival	18 May 2014
116	Myq Kaplan	John Lennon's true assassin Stephen King, A defense of puns, & Competing against a computer in a joke-off	30 May 2014
117	Sarah Morgan	Head trauma that created a math savant, A defense of common core math, & Children's natural skepticism of circular arguments	4 June 2014
118	Jason Nash	New information on how the Moon was formed, A debate on parabolic flights, & New research on why Facebook bums you out	12 June 2014
119	Adam Buxton	The counting skills of black bears, Whittling your fingers to type on a Blackberry, & A digression on areolar Montgomery glands	18 June 2014
120	Dr. Christopher Schmitt	old world/new world ape divergence, why certain primates are getting obese, & Koko the gorilla's nipple obsession	24 June 2014
121	Renee Gauthier & Dr. Kevin Peter Hickerson	The actual cost of going to the Moon, Working near CERN, and Studying neutrinos	1 July 2014
PH 4	David Cope	Probably History: Video Games	9 July 2014
122	TJ Chambers	Chimpanzee fads, Bear fellatio, & The origin of Winnie the Pooh	18 July 2014
123	Jordan and Ben Brady	Lacerta lizard people, Pluto possibly getting reinstated as a planet, & Suspended animation for gunshot victims	22 July 2014
124	Beth Stelling	Bats navigating via polarized light, Real 3D vs. fake 3D, & The cancer-fighting effects of cat poop	29 July 2014
125	Brent Schmidt & Zach Pugh	Re-purposing coal mines for science, When did Hogwarts abandon muggle technology, & Teenage nervous breakdowns	7 August 2014
126	Matt Champagne and Auggie Smith	Harry Potter corrections, Blair Witch Project disappointments, & Kilobots	16 August 2014
127	Kulap Vilaysack and Mark Agee	The Laotian Civil War, Bo penh nyang, & Dealing with gambling addiction in your family	21 August 2014
128	Adrian Poynton	Getting kicked out of chemistry class, A pseudo-scientific look at the history of shoe sizes, & Secret codes for elevators	22 August 2014
129	Bethany Dwyer	Internet indignation over leaked celeb nudes, Burning Man stories, & A moment of silence for the dead space geckos	3 September 2014
130	Daniel Sloss	Semen's state of matter, The Jack The Ripper story everyone's talking about, & Extreme haunted houses	9 September 2014
131	Roisin Conaty	Using psychedelic mushrooms to quit smoking, A woman with no cerebellum, & Scorpions that live in your books	
132	Jordan Morris and Dr. Matt Faulkner	Burning Man, musically controlled Tesla Coil, & How to create duophonic music with lightning	23 September 2014
133	Tim Minchin & Dr. Amy Parish	Live from LA PodFest: Bonobos as a model for human feminism & DIY OB/GYNs	1 October 2014
134	Colonel Chris Hadfield	Colonel Chris Hadfield time spent on the ISS	8 October 2014
135	Jeff Richards	Why school sucks, Freddie Mercury's jacket, & Lost cities revealed by lasers	14 October 2014
136	Henry Phillips	Being an awkwardness magnet, the G-spot doesn't exist, & Jesse is responsible for every wet dream	21 October 2014
137	Wil Anderson	The depressingly high percentages of Americans who believe in haunted houses, the origin of copulation, & cola-flavored genitals	29 October 2014
138	Holly Walsh	The Pope's bold new stance on evolution and the Big bang, a recently identified fragment of Amelia Earhart's plane, & chopping arachnophobia out of a man's brain	5 November 2104
139	Tim Lee	Australia's Big Banana, the problem with butt implants, & homosexuality correlation among identical twins	12 November 2104
140	Emily Gordon	Astronomy sleuths uncovering the origins of Monet paintings, a robot that makes you think there's a ghost behind you, & the Third Man Factor experienced by mountain climbers	18 November 2014
141	Michael Kosta	Being the 864th best tennis player in the world, the age-accelerating effects of milk, & contagious yawning in wolves	25 November 2014
142	Alison Haislip	Getting serenaded by wannabe Top Gun pilots, Charles Manson's nuptials, & the man who turned himself into Papa Smurf	2 December 2014
143	Mike Phirman	Trace elements, why we need to be done with fossil fuels by 2100, & the clearest-ever image of planetary formation	9 December 2014
144	Dr. Christina Campbell	Chimps catching bushbabies with spears, why you shouldn't use sign language in front of primates, & the drunken monkey hypothesis	16 December 2014
145	Janet Varney	Spider sex and hairy mouth-parts, the largest genetic analysis of gay brothers, & new evidence on human/neanderthal breeding	23 December 2014
Holiday Bonus Episode	Lizard Case	Interview with Lizard Case: Nashville songwriter and tavern proprietor	1 January 2015
146	No Guest	A British effort to send a probe to the moon, the slurred singing of drunk birds & whether or not Earth's water came from comets	8 January 2015
147	Gareth Reynolds	The point of the narwhal's point, what self-tickling tells us about brains, & HIV getting milder	13 January 2015
148	Tone Bell	Strummer snail, how Facebook likes can predict personality, & an unbeatable poker computer	14 January 2015
149	Patrick Keane	Polar bear wangs and pollution, P.T.S.D. in the ancient world, and the speech Nixon would have given if the Moon landing had gone wrong	26 January 2015
150	Todd Glass	Jesus painting restoration, un-boiling an egg, & why you shouldn't hit your kids	4 February 2015
151	Jackie Gold	Broken Heart Syndrome, UK lawmakers approving three-parent babies, & over-the-counter medicine linked to dementia	12 February 2015
152	Barry Castagnola	Rodents of unusual size with giant teeth, the doomsday list, & a new Earth-like planet	18 February 2015
153	Nikki Glaser	Naughty aphids ruining symbiosis for everyone, light slowed down, & gerbils and rats and plagues, oh my	25 February 2015
154	Brooks Wheelan	RHCP tattoos, Juggalos and tattoo removal creams, & why bubbles don't spill	3 March 2015
155	Laraine Newman	spider painkillers, worms that crawl in and out, & DNA-rendered faces	March 9, 2015
156	Sara Schaefer	denim facts, time travel plans & 9/11 tales	March 19, 2015
157	Robin Ince & Brian Cox (physicist)	David Lynch's America, why the queen is common, & Andy's obsession with The Jinx	March 24, 2015
158	Caitlin Doughty	what goes down in a crematory, why dead bodies aren't dangerous to be around, & our society's disconnect with its dead	March 31, 2015
159	Jay Famiglietti	using surface water and reservoirs vs. dipping into groundwater reserves, agricultural vs. residential water consumption, & why local rainfall doesn't help us get out of our water deficit	April 7, 2015
160	Brendon Walsh	the problem with human cannibalism, cleaning your brain surgery tools, laser wound healing	April 14, 2015
161	Ryan Singer	heart-to-heart hugs, the origin of toasting, when to use questions to influence people, the return of brontosaurus	April 21, 2015
162	Rye Silverman	trans facts, the Riddick man, how to spot a ghost	April 30, 2015
163	Sex at Dawn Author Dr. Chris Ryan, Caitlin Gill and Lisa Best, Live from the Bridgetown Comedy Festival	the prehistoric roots of modern sexuality, the devastating impact of agriculture on our species, and whether it's actually in our nature to be monogamous	May 12, 2015
164	Chris Crofton	conspiracy theory talk, the reason why the same side of the moon always faces us, and the clouds of millions of baby spiders descending on Australia	May 19, 2015
165	Kira Soltanovich	how to say places, badly named bars, Alzheimer's and video games (and a debunking)	May 27, 2015
166	Erin Gibson	a chocolate science scam, herpes-based skin cancer therapy, dementor wasps and zombie cockroaches, charismatic megafauna and the Ugly Animal Preservation Society	June 3, 2015
167	Sean Patton	immaculate conception among sawfish, putting kill switches in genetically modified organisms, and what baby traits you should be allowed to edit	June 16, 2015
168	Bryan Safi	the Philae comet lander waking up, time-traveling wave-particles, chimps that cook and sauerkraut's effect on anxiety	June 24, 2015
169	Jackie Kashian, TJ Chambers and Mark Agee	left-handed kangaroos, the Pluto probe suffering a glitch, a creepy Google AI chatbot getting philosophical and cats controlling mice with chemicals in their urine	July 6, 2015
170	Eddie Pepitone	an upcoming mini-ice age that might not be upcoming, animal testing and monkey mind melds, citrus and cancer, toothy fish and fairy fossils, and how we're cleaning up space	July 14, 2015
171	Pluto Flyby with Dipak Srinivasan	New Horizons mission, the MESSENGER Mercury orbiter and the upcoming Solar Probe Plus mission to scrape the surface of the Sun	July 20, 2015
172	Hampton Yount	paying for a Pluto probe or an NFL stadium, slowing air travel, colonizing the moon, bacon-flavored kale, being controlled by semen, and a malaria vaccine	July 31, 2015
173	Drennon Davis	earthquake-jumping and rock balancing, old mice with young blood, fantastical EM drive stuff, chatting bonobos, 3D-printed drugs, and an Ebola vaccine	August 5, 2015
174	Jesse Popp	a newly discovered tessellating pentagon, Penrose tiling, Fermat's Last Theorem, space lettuce, giant marrows, dreamy eye movements, brain-scanning software, brain dipsticks and trepanning	August 12, 2015
175	Matt Braunger and Auggie Smith	early detection cancer urine tests, the EPA's river fuck-up, arsenic and widows, using shade balls to protect reservoirs, the web's too-weak random numbers, Benford's Law, and tiger calls.	August 18, 2015
176	David Huntsberger and Jesse Case	rodeo facts, the awakeness drug Provigil, cheating in war, Neanderthals' massive eyes that may or may not have caused extinction, and tiny new unafraid dwarf lemurs	August 26, 2015
177	Matt Knudsen	pseudoscience and snake oil, merchant marines, space elevators, LED light pollution, why global warming is good for the rich and the incredible octopus.	August 31, 2015
178	Amber Preston	whether video games produce violent people or not, smoking birds, violent ancient farmers, books that purify water, the most electric place on earth, and whether swimming in lightning dangerous	September 9, 2015
179	Josie Long and Stuart Goldsmith	how condensation works, what voltage is, magnetic wormholes, debunking spinach debunking, psych experiments that can't be reproduced and a brand new hominid	September 17, 2015
180	Patton Oswalt, Sean Carroll and Brooks Wheelan Live from LA PodFest	original third host Brooks Wheelan, along with comedy legend Patton Oswalt and Caltech theoretical physicist/cosmologist Dr. Sean Carroll	September 23, 2015
181	Tim Batt and Guy Montgomery	monkey selfies, AIDS news, the AIDS Healthcare Foundation, the climate change “lawsuit”, a new target for New Horizons, new Pluto pics, and the Apollo 13 stage show	September 29, 2015
182	Dave Anthony	anti-burp compounds, fixing brain cancer with antidepressants and blood thinners, cannabis not causing schizophrenia, a double comet situation, and 3D-printed hearts	October 8, 2015
183	Jacob Sirof	new jobs, orgasm fungi, Star Wars science, Wales and fake waves, a Chinese telescope on the moon, cheating Jews, converting vaccine skeptics and pig genes	October 15, 2015
184	Johann Hari	the emotional deafness of the rich, the government's persecution of Billie Holiday, new theories of addiction, Rat Park, Portugal's radical policy changes and the way to sell America on drug decriminalization	October 21, 2015
185	Kelly Carlin	calculus, mind-body connections, right answers in math, whether snake fear is hard-wired, science and the Canadian election, magnetic brain control, the Gripsholm Lion, orange peels to clean up mercury, Marie Curie and Mabel Normand	October 28, 2015
186	Kerry Godliman	science vs. art, cadaver fists, the persistence of the plague, embarrassing bodies, a clickbait generator, and bee farmers	November 5, 2015
187	Sofie Hagen and Sarah Morgan	Danish science, being thrown free, a chimera twin baby, new ghosts, a new bat, spider bites, China's space plans, eyesight, face blindness, the bacon cancer scare, and crocodile eyes	November 11, 2015
188	Travis Clark, Dax Jordan and TJ Chambers	breaking the blood brain barrier, GPS versus sextants, DARYL and what it stands for, jet packs, rocket belts, wing things and personal helicopters, and dementia and Dr. Demento	November 18, 2015
189	Yan Zhu	online security, privacy, encryption, HTTPS Everywhere, podcast patent trolls, Privacy Badger, the Tor browser, the future of online ads, Edward Snowden, and the Silk Road	November 30, 2015
190	Daniel Van Kirk	cow insemination, memory games, outrage culture, the climate and smoking, Merchants of Doubt, profound bullshit, David Avocado Wolfe, the surprising appearance of the far side of the Moon, TV quality, Bubbli, blindness and multiple personalities, movies based on the 10% of the brain idea and a Venus probe hack	December 9, 2015
191	Cole Stratton	academic decathlons, bringing spoiled wine back to life, Phineas Gage, the Amber neighbor mystery, an old satellite that came back to life, red mercury, letterboxing and summer births	December 17, 2015
192	Ryan Conner	the passing of David Bowie, Alvin Stardust, computer programming, a mountain lion with horrifying teeth growing out of its head, praying mantises in 3D glasses, wine story corrections, types of drunks, sperm switches, and bone foam	January 14, 2016
193	Adam Savage and Paul and Storm live from SF Sketchfest	science myths that won't die, Billy Joel videos, our overeducated audience, soaking kiwis and the wet strength of Charmin	January 19, 2016
194	Maria Shehata and Nick Dixon	the discovery of penicillin, vaginal steaming, poop transplant pills, autism and gut flora, standing on escalators, man/woman flu, and bringing a tortoise species back to life	January 27, 2016
195	Maude Garrett	Foley artists, weird childhood memorization, a computer that beat a Go champion, E-sports, a new planet, a new HIV treatment, how quickly conspiracies would reveal themselves, and a monkey head transplant	February 1, 2016
196	Ingrid Oliver	pengwings, umlaut words, plastination, bees and weather, sniffer bees, first class flight, anti-aging, the Zika virus, how we'll all die, and ball-packing and avalanches	February 19, 2016
--	Gravitational Wave LIGO Spectacular	With Janna Levin: science fluff, Marco Drago's discovery?, How LIGO works, 30 solar mass black holes, test signals, the actual paper explaining the recent gravitational wave findings, BICEP's failure, and new black holes	February 19, 2016
197	Dr. Chiara Mingarelli	low-frequency gravitational waves, pulsar timings arrays and black hole binary systems with masses that are billions of times that of the Sun	February 25, 2016
198	Alice Wetterlund	Equinox, aliens, Star Trek, why humans have chins, navigating in Ghana, space lasers and exploding e-cigarettes	March 2, 2016
199	Rick Rosner, the Man with the Second-Highest IQ in the World	What3Words, xkcd's take on passwords, IQ tests, spending ten years in high school, Olbers’ Paradox, The Singularity, Ray Kurzweil, being Borg-ed up, and Alcor freezing heads	March 8, 2016
200	Jesse Case and Brooks Wheelan	break-ups, cancer and even a few science stories	March 17, 2016
201	Tom Bell	unscrambling eggs to cure cancer, an academic paper that cites The Creator, eagles vs. drones, and spider boners in amber.	March 23, 2016
202	Jessica Michelle Singleton and Christina Walkinshaw	super coffee, Microsoft AI, a scientifically impossible Indiegogo, Edx.org's free learning, Vasalgel in rabbits, rabbit kidneys, long term good drug effects and fracking-induced earthquakes	April 2, 2016
203	Jason Belleville	mustaches and tattoos, academic papers, encyclopedias, Stan and Donavan Freberg, using giant lasers to hide from aliens, growing skin and nude mice, a battery-operated salty fork, flavors on planes and the greatest number of digits of pi we'll ever really need	April 6, 2016
204	Jon Huck and Sunah Bilsted	chemistry on acid, a Carl Sagan tribute act, the historic SpaceX landing, hyperhidrosis, antiperspirant conspiracies, a too-stealthy sea vessel, Hawking and the Russians sending a tiny craft to Alpha Centauri, and antimemories	April 13, 2016
205	April Richardson	Dyson face, a dung-based clue to Hannibal's crossing route, a paralyzed man (sort of) playing guitar, dinosaurs and their eggs and a real-time re-creation of the sinking of the Titanic.	April 19, 2016
206	Andrew Michaan	celebrity deaths, Catholic aliens, black holes, the Large Hadron Collider, bed bugs, a penis spider bite, IUDs in space and jellyfish stings	April 27, 2016
207	Fahim Anwar	bringing people back from the dead, archaeology vs. paleontology, another EM Drive debunking from Sean Carroll, enzyme corrections, 3D-printed fake rhino horns, and breast cancer gene mapping	May 4, 2016
208	Zach Sherwin	p-branes, playing Einstein, the new Ghostbusters script, silver underwear, a teen's Mayan discovery that may not be what it seems, everyone yells air ball at the same pitch, diving robots, being bepenised, and long-lasting batteries	May 11, 2016
209	Mary Roach	the curious science of humans at war, combat medic training, stink bombs, genital transplant surgery, the war on heat, shark repellant and diarrhea as a threat to national security	May 25, 2016
210	Ella Gale and Sarah Mirk	gender biases in science reporting, women in science (and comedy) and why it's hard to make bagels when it's hot outside	June 8, 2016
211	John Eric Hoffman	machine learning, neural networks, Maxwell's Demon, DeepDream, natural language processing and the recent short sci-fi film written by AI	June 15, 2016
212	Alie Ward	supernumerary nipples, owl pellet mouse skeletons, a third lizard sex, an inflatable space station room, aeronautic training, antibiotic-resistant bacteria, MRSA, and wrestling bugs	June 21, 2016
213	Professor Sophie Scott and Nick Doody	the neural basis of human speech processing	July 4, 2016
214	Derek Sheen and Sean Jordan	Juno's pics of Jupiter, AIDS ceasing to be an epidemic in Australia, good news on the ozone hole's healing, and even more good news about finding new reserves of helium	July 14, 2016
215	Dr. Farah Alibay	a real-world Armageddon mission to redirect an asteroid, CubeSats, giant geysers on Saturn's moon Enceladus, the importance of planetary protection and upcoming solar system exploration missions	July 19, 2016
216	Al Jackson	ball-boiling as contraception, why flossing may not help you, steroids in sports, Al's research, stomach taps, old cars vs. new cars, firefighting equipment sharing and fire in space	July 28, 2016
217	Ahmed Bharoocha and Auggie Smith	a new hard material, the Mohs hardness scale, Pliny the Elder, the Randi paranormal challenge, new brain areas, a new biohybrid creature, a Mars laser with free will, and artwork damagers	August 15, 2016
218	Christian Duguay and Emily Maya Mills	burning ants, Hitler's disguises, bank robbery, infant simulators that actually increase teen pregnancy, Lucy's death, a miraculous new painkiller, ecstasy/MDMA, Tasmanian devils developing cancer resistance and the ban on antibacterial soap	September 6, 2016
219	Shane Mauss	evolutionary biology, the state of scientific research into recreational drugs, simulated near-death experiences, and the differences between trying ayahuasca and DMT	September 16, 2016
220	Steele Saunders	mice and apologies, weed vs. opioids in car crashes, bumper sticker flashing, Australians origins, and giraffes actually being many giraffes	September 30, 2016
221	Shawn Pearlman	budgie rules for not colliding, amateur turtle surgery, getting intelligence from your mother, a baby with three parents and the most accurate (and adorable) dinosaur renderings yet.	October 10, 2016
222	Lizzy Cooperman	Invisalign, fan death, having Lyme disease, Nobel Prizes in chemistry, physics and medicine, self-eating boobs and the end of Rosetta	October 17, 2016
223	Greg Behrendt	the joys of riding bikes, cod accents, Nazis on meth, Provigil and sleep, black widow spider viruses, a correction to the intelligence story, Alan Turing music and Dr. Strange	October 25, 2016
224	Moshe Kasher	playground games, stealthy spider eaters, mice fall for the same tricks as humans, the rise of renewables, vaccine deniers who accidentally proved the counterargument, conspiracy theories, the AIDS denial mom, the Duesberg hypothesis, and an accidental discovery of a way to slow aging in the brain	November 2, 2016
225	Grant Lyon	naked cow science, why reservoirs aren't all good, surgery farts, nightmare machines, sentencing algorithms, a third hominid and Patient Letter O	November 10, 2016
226	Toby Muresianu	Macedonian Facebook clickbait, polling methodologies, the supermoon, dog domestication, brain wifi that reverses monkey paralysis and a new type of bond	November 14, 2016
227	Eric Lampaert and JJ Whitehead	NASA's Space Poop Challenge, paper bike helmets, an end to zika's global health emergency, the hanging of a shipwrecked monkey and a circus elephant, and two moose found locked together in ice.	November 22, 2016
228	Cecily Knobler and Auggie Smith	hospice humor, intervention critiques, sex addiction getting depathologized, Myers-Briggs personality types, high school kids undercutting Martin Shkreli's expensive drugs, Google's AI that can lip read better than humans, SNL's Trump responsibility, naming Secretaries of State	December 1, 2016
229	Bryan Olsen and Dominic Harris	battery pigs, Buzz and Antarctica, dog memory, gut Parkinson's, fecal transplants again, new elements, the chemistry helpline, uncombable hair syndrome, and platypus venom that can help diabetes	December 5, 2016
230	Forrest Shaw	face painting and Mexican fireworks and lax laws, manatee preservation and their removal from storm drains, a bid to save the smallest porpoise, Chinese appetites for rare animals, a feathery dinosaur tail encased in amber, SSREs and the bees of the ocean	December 17, 2016
231	The Secret Life of Fat with Dr. Sylvia Tara	the function and behavior of fat, why it's essential to our lives, and how our genetics, gender, hormones and microbiomes affect it	January 3, 2017
232	Steve Hall	pamphlets and Thomas Paine, the passing of dark matter-discoverer Vera Rubin, ants using tiny sponges to carry honey, molten underground rivers, Bill Gates and an effective Ebola vaccine, Dr. Jane Gregory's Cognitive Behave Yourself	January 3, 2017
233	Maggie Rowe	entropy and evolution, false memory and sleep, synaesthesia and lightning strikes, icebergs and global warming, and radio bursts from a galaxy billions of light years away	January 9, 2017
234	Laura Willcox and Andy Peters	failing low-level tests, sharks reproducing asexually, dud rockets, a massive Venus wave, the truth about lemmings and other potentially dodgy kids' films, plus alchemy	January 17, 2017
235	Andrew Ti	injecting frog neurotoxins in eyes, unethical self-experiments, the EPA vs. Trump, fake news inoculation, a free course on critical reasoning, and mouse lasers	January 25, 2017
236	James Acaster	city rivalries, science marches, Jerusalem Syndrome and Paris Syndrome, human/pig chimeras, cats possibly being as intelligent as dogs, giant otter fossils, slowing down light, a light speed sonic boom	January 30, 2017
237	Simon Talbot	Jehovah's witnessing, our no-butthole ancestor, dinosaur protein, Danish traditions, time crystals, ask-a-sociopath, talking viruses and a possible way to reverse antibiotic resistance	February 6, 2017
238	Ever Mainard and Deborah Etta	scientific weirdos and Galois, starfish and STDs, finger regrowth, why whales jump, unethical kitten experiments, science fairs gone wrong, moon stuff and monkeys and dogs judging cooperation in humans	February 13, 2017
239	Kate Willett	NASA's big exoplanet announcement, the twin paradox, twin astronauts, fake Twitter accounts, a study showing that cats may not make you crazy, and a chiropractor's creative menstrual invention.	February 22, 2017
240	Johnny Pemberton	water shortage solutions and Indiegogo lies, pipe bombs, ulcerative colitis, a better way to crowdsource, training bees to play with balls, chiropractic, more opinions on cats and toxo, and saving polar ice	March 3, 2017
241	Candice Thompson	ASMR, Richard Simmons, anti-Brit racism, what zoo animals taste like, Neanderthals’ medication, mini-pigs and films about them, iCondoms, 3D printing medical supplies and pizzas, swimming pool pee and dog fMRIs	March 9, 2017
242	Phoebe Bottoms and TJ Chambers	sirens and pigs, breaking up with your physics teacher, microphones in your pocket, why avoiding gluten might hurt you, unvaccinated Australians, OCD, which animals you can't keep as pets, and why plastic is still bad	March 18, 2017
243	MK Paulsen	public policy, October Sky, RIP radioactive boy scout, a heart of spinach, German fake suns, beating cancer and stopping aging, strep, the Ten Commandments, and chimp death rituals.	March 28, 2017
244	Henry Phillips	graphene water filtration, a real-life (sort-of) Iron Man, funny foreign names, CT scan risks, CTs vs. MRIs, biologics, dumb/smart interview questions and the probability of rude names happening randomly	April 5, 2017
245	Bryan Vokey, Carmen Morales and TJ Chambers	Georgia creationism, sperm-delivered drugs, erogenous T-Rex noses, geological Brexit, Segways on boats, hamsters on Viagra and how memories are made	April 14, 2017
246	Mary Mack and Tim Harmston	Frog rockets, orchestral doubling, Army band status, Guy Fawkes, accidentally melting science, dinobirds, kids with beaks, triple yolks, yogurt toppings economics, the book-stacking problem and why shoelaces come untied	April 19, 2017
247	Russell Howard	unintentional rudeness, new spider species, birds of paradise dances, Catalina and gerbil smuggling, more spiders, scaring off mice, artificial wombs and throwing things	May 5, 2017
248	Live from Bridgetown Comedy Festival with Dr. Betsey Brada, Dr. Bryan Horne and Hampton Yount	guests' expertise is in health and medicine in southern Africa and bardic song in contemporary Russia	May 5, 2017
249	Neil deGrasse Tyson	The universe's origins, the forces that govern it, general relativity, the multiverse, dark matter, dark energy, the fact that the universe is under no obligation to make sense to you, and the questions that Neil would ask a physicist in the year 2317	May 17, 2017
250	Subhah Agarwal	actuarial tables and suicide, copying comics, asteroid timing, river meandering, a perfect dino, stable flamingos, Italian vaccines, mussel gloop for scarring, pretty pics of Saturn's rings and a puffy styrofoam planet	May 25, 2017
251	Renee Colvert	Paris disagreements, universal healthcare, Australian healthcare, another LIGO victory, the Parker Solar Probe, the monkey mafia who steal your stuff and sell it back to you for a cracker, measuring sheep pain, and hand washing rules	June 2, 2017
252	Curtis Cook	premiere parties and imposter syndrome, catapult-making, Moravec's paradox, dino feathers and scales, getting re-upped on your vaccines, rust getting unfairly blamed for tetanus and parasitic worm healing	June 8, 2017
253	Lucas Kavner	rebooted shows, reporting on robots, dog and wolf sharing, how breakfast affects benevolence, Einstein's impossible experiment finally performed, gut bacteria and dinosaur sex	June 15, 2017
255	Dr. Jane Gregory	Guest discusses cognitive behavior therapy and how she helps people suffering from anxiety, post-traumatic stress disorder, obsessive-compulsive disorder and more	July 3, 2017
256	Jason Reich	eating street apples and syringes, Vegas strategy, an HIV cure, gonorrhea vaccines, vaquitas, fireworks technology, and what Goop has in common with InfoWars	July 12, 2017
257	Jim Hegarty	good and bad TV, the Up Series, fireworks contamination, dog domestication, junk DNA, the crazy fly book price, Brewster's Millions rules, egg shapes and egg refrigeration	July 20, 2017
258	Heather Thomson	early email addresses, Woodboys, laws of mathematics that don't apply in Australia, how humans can out-jog horses, antibiotic lies, reversing brain damage with oxygen, and Moon water	August 2, 2017
259	Kara Klenk	why Trump isn't good for comedy, bad forensics, hungry thinky worms, penis biting, bleach enemas to cure autism, slugs, Canaanites who just won't die and The Goldwater Rule	August 12, 2017
260	Dipak Srinivasan	the Mercury MESSENGER mission, the Pluto New Horizons flyby, Kuiper belt object 2014 MU69, and the upcoming Parker Solar Probe and a mission to Jupiter's moon Europa	August 21, 2017
261	Sara Benincasa	Burning Man, Woodstock '99, talking people down from drugs, creating cryptocurrencies, whiskey dilution, faces trained on Skype, and Zika for brain tumors	September 8, 2017
262	Casey Ley	gay genes, gay face and AI, the first openly gay guy ever, snow leopards becoming less endangered, the end of Cassini, the first live 4K video from space, and the life of Sam Blackman	September 15, 2017
263	Sharon Houston	flavor profiles, hurricane prep, Hemingway lookalikes, wolverines, duck penises, finger phone contact, genes vs. alleles, the concept of zero, chisanbop counting, zapping people out of vegetative states, and spider sacrifice	September 27, 2017
264	Alice Fraser	jet lag, breaking the seal, MS, a body clock Nobel Prize, Dr. Matt Walker's new sleep book, a LIGO Nobel Prize and Janna Levin's book on it, the downside of grass-fed beef, and cargo cults	October 5, 2017
265	Brooks Wheelan and Dave Anthony live from LA PodFest	a live Probably Science from the Millenium Biltmore hotel in downtown Los Angeles as part of the 2017 Los Angeles Podcast Festival	October 13, 2017
266	Galloway Allbright	the death of expertise, the origin of bluegrass, in-flight death plans, a neutron star collision, the LIGO song, psilocybin for depression, genes for OCD, an upcoming Chinese space lab crash, China's NASA and scorpions' toxic blend	October 23, 2017
267	Jason Saenz	debunked early psychology experiments, oyster hearing, squirrels and lepers, armadillo leprosy in Florida, a good moonbase location, Pluto's Cave, herbal meds and cancer, and blood sweat	October 31, 2017
268	Raj Desai	looking more closely at the placebo effect, and how the extinction of dinosaurs made way for mammals to come out during the day	November 8, 2017
269	Chris Turner	archeology, old wine, old Amish people, gay evolution, monkeys playing chicken and the theory of mind	November 17, 2017
270	Dr. Danna Staaf	Humboldt squid, penis fencing among hermaphroditic flatworms, calamari pre-date the dinosaurs, and why we should all have a lot more respect and awe for cephalopods in general	November 21, 2017
271	Eli Braden	jazz addicts, conspiracy theories, not a head transplant, prehistoric women's strength, mnemonics, grossing out chimps, health codes and California D	November 30, 2017
272	Pat Francis	donating medals, miming phones, teen brains that can't tell what's important, homeless etiquette, Voyager I firing up again, coffee and health, grammar rules and beard posturing	December 5, 2017
273	Jim Jefferies	self-driving cars, feeding spiders graphene, a new space tire, Mars temperatures, cricket commentary, onion ubiquity, Dubai space agriculture, business class from the ground, and upsetting rock stars	December 18, 2017
274	Environmental Science and Sustainable Food with Dr. Pete Newton	"food miles" not all they're cracked up to be, hunting pangolins, anaconda attacks in the field, the perils of ruminants, changing our behavior, changing a whole country's behavior, and lab-grown meat	December 26, 2017
275	TJ Chambers and Auggie Smith	the recent SpaceX launch, traveling salesbees, sleeping jellyfish, Matt Walker on sleep, and how to keep your exercise resolution	January 3, 2018
