= Bil Dwyer =

American stand-up comedian, game-show host, actor, and writer (born 1962)

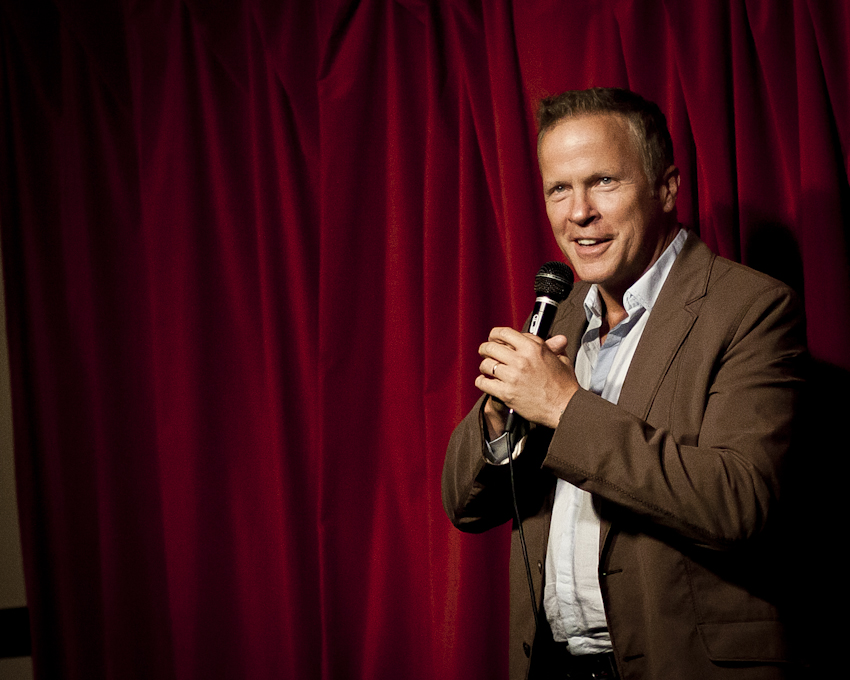
- Dwyer performs in 2013
- Born: William Michael Dwyer; March 30, 1962 (age 64); Evergreen Park, Illinois, U.S.
- Education: Southern Illinois University Carbondale
- Occupations: Stand-up comedian, game-show host, actor
- Years active: 1994–present

William Michael "Bil" Dwyer (born March 30, 1962) is an American stand-up comedian, game-show host, actor, and writer. He is perhaps most well known as the host or play-by-play announcer on series such as BattleBots, I've Got a Secret, and Extreme Dodgeball, as well as several iterations of VH1's I Love the '70s, I Love the '80s, and I Love the '90s, and a 2006 appearance on Last Comic Standing. His debut comedy album, Am I Yelling?, was released in September 2020 by comedy label Stand Up! Records.

== Personal life ==
Dwyer was born in Evergreen Park, Illinois, the youngest of five children in an Irish Catholic family. He graduated from Southern Illinois University Carbondale in 1984 with a degree in radio and television. Before landing on comedy as a career Dwyer worked as a DJ, a salesman, and a tour guide at Universal Studios. Dwyer has been married since 1993 and has four children. He lives in Glendale, California.

Dwyer spells his first name with only one L, once explaining to the Los Angeles Times, "the second is superfluous."

== Career ==
=== Stand-up comedy ===
Dwyer began performing stand-up while in college in Chicago, and later moved to Los Angeles. His comedy tends to focus on domestic topics such as marriage, family, and children. Tahoe Daily Tribune writer Howie Nave described his style as "somewhat sarcastic", but added, "you can see his Midwestern sweetness emerge."

In 2001, he recorded a half-hour special for Comedy Central Presents. In 2006, he was a contestant on the fourth season of Last Comic Standing, but was eliminated in the second regular episode, finishing 10th in the competition. He has also performed on Comedy Bang Bang, The Tonight Show with Jay Leno and The Late Late Show with Craig Kilborn.

=== Game shows ===
Dwyer hosted five seasons of the Comedy Central show BattleBots from 2000 to 2002. He was the play-by-play announcer for the Game Show Network's Extreme Dodgeball in 2004, and in 2006, he hosted a remake of the panel show I've Got a Secret whose twist was that all the featured panelists were gay. The series ran for 40 episodes and was canceled after one season, but the Hollywood Reporter praised Dwyer's performance as host, calling him "affable and fast with a quip." Other shows Dwyer has hosted include Dirty Rotten Cheater for PAX/Ion Television in 2003, the FSN sports-trivia show Ultimate Fan League, as well as a YouTube series about golf, The Range with Bil Dwyer. He hosted the 2005 series MTV's The 70s House in character as the intentionally cheesy "Bert Van Styles".

=== Acting ===
Dwyer appeared on the 2007 Cartoon Network live-action/animation hybrid series Out of Jimmy's Head in a dual role as the main character's father and his school guidance counselor. He had a recurring role on the sitcom Hot in Cleveland as Valerie Bertinelli's ex-husband. Dwyer played the lead role of Leon, a washed-up champion ping-pong player, in the 2010 dark-comedy web series Kill Spin. The series ran for 10 episodes on the social-media website Lockerz. He has also been a guest star on a number of other sitcoms and TV shows, including Space Force, The Middle, Lopez, Parks and Recreation, House of Lies, Childrens Hospital, Suburgatory, The Larry Sanders Show, Ally McBeal, and iCarly. Dwyer's film credits include Ski School 2, The Bogus Witch Project and What Planet Are You From? Dwyer also starred in a series of Toyota commercials about the "Tiny Football League" which ran during NBC's Sunday Night Football.

== Discography ==
- Am I Yelling? (Stand Up! Records, 2020)

== Selected podcast appearances ==
Probably Science, Episode 364: Bil Dwyer (December 6, 2019)
Never Not Funny with Jimmy Pardo, multiple appearances
The Tom Barnard Podcast, Bil Dwyer and Gold Country (September 4, 2012)
Probably Science, Episode 26: Bil Dwyer (June 25, 2012)
The Dork Forest with Jackie Kashian, Rob Delaney and Bil Dwyer (December 15, 2009)
