= Marcus Wehr =

American football player (born 2000)

No. 76
- Position: Offensive guard

Personal information
- Born: December 1, 2000 (age 25); Billings, Montana, U.S.
- Listed height: 6 ft 3 in (1.91 m)
- Listed weight: 301 lb (137 kg)

Career information
- High school: Billings Central Catholic (Billings, Montana)
- College: Montana State (2019–2024)

Awards and highlights
- 2× First-team FCS All-American (2023, 2024); 2× First-team All-Big Sky (2023, 2024)
- Stats at ESPN

Marcus Wehr (born December 1, 2000) is an American former college football offensive guard for the Montana State Bobcats.

== Early life ==
Wehr attended Billings Central Catholic High School in Billings, Montana, helping the football team win the Class A state championship as a senior. He committed to play college football for the Montana State Bobcats.

== College career ==
In his first two collegiate seasons in 2019 and 2020, Wehr appeared in just one game for Montana State. In 2021, he appeared in just three games notching three tackles. Ahead of the 2022 season, Wehr made the switch from defensive line to offensive line. In his first season on the offensive line he started seven games before sustaining a season-ending injury. In 2023, Wehr made 12 starts for Montana State, where for his performance he was named a consensus first-team FCS All-American and first-team All-Big Sky. In 2024, he made 16 starts for the Bobcats, and was once again named first-team all-Big Sky and first-team FCS All-American. After the season, Wehr declared for the 2025 NFL draft and accepted an invite to participate in the 2025 East-West Shrine Bowl.

== Professional career ==
Pre-draft measurables
Height	Weight	Arm length	Hand span	40-yard dash	10-yard split	20-yard split	20-yard shuttle	Three-cone drill	Vertical jump	Broad jump	Bench press
6 ft 2 5/8 in (1.90 m)	301 lb (137 kg)	31 5/8 in (0.80 m)	8 3/8 in (0.21 m)	5.15 s	1.72 s	2.92 s	4.91 s	8.15 s	34.5 in (0.88 m)	9 ft 6 in (2.90 m)	29 reps
All values from Pro Day

On April 28, 2025, Wehr accepted a minicamp invite from the Seattle Seahawks.
