= Dax Jordan =

American actor and standup comedian

- Born: Dax Jordan; Los Angeles, California, U.S.
- Notable work: Seattle International Comedy Competition; Untraceable; Freedom State; Skyn Deep

Comedy career
- Years active: 2001–present
- Medium: Stand-up, television, film
- Genres: Observational comedy, self-deprecation, political satire, wordplay
- Website: www.daxjordan.com

Dax Jordan is an American actor and standup comedian. He was born and lives in Los Angeles, California and was raised in Sandy, Oregon.

== Standup comedy ==
Jordan has performed as a stand up comedian since 2005, appearing several times at the Bridgetown Comedy Festival in Portland, Oregon. He placed third in the 2010 Seattle International Comedy Competition.

Jordan was also the celebrity host for the awards ceremony of the first annual SymmyS Awards for outstanding palindrome achievement in 2013. The judges for the event included Jordan's inspiration, "Weird Al" Yankovic as well as comedians Demetri Martin and Jackie Kashian, musician John Flansburgh of They Might Be Giants, and New York Times crossword puzzle editor Will Shortz.

== Acting ==
Jordan has appeared in several movies including Untraceable, Freedom State, and Skyn Deep. He shot and directed the short film Who the F*ck is Chip Seinfeld?, which was later expanded into a feature mockumentary by the filmmaker Mike Newman.
