= Billings Central Catholic High School =

Location
- 3 Broadwater Avenue; Billings, (Yellowstone County), Montana 59101; United States; 45°46′39″N 108°30′57″W

Information
- Type: Private, Coeducational
- Motto: "Founded On Faith"
- Religious affiliation: Roman Catholic
- Patron saints: Blessed Virgin Mary, Saint Patrick
- Established: 1944
- Status: Active
- CEEB code: 270-087
- President: Andrew McDonald
- Principal: Nolan Trafton
- Chaplain: Fr. John Pankratz
- Grades: 9–12
- Enrollment: 369 (2024-25)
- Color
- Slogan: "Faith, Family Spirit, Academic Excellence"
- Athletics conference: Eastern A
- Mascot: Ram
- Team name: Rams
- Rivals: Laurel High School
- Accreditation: Northwest Accreditation Commission, Western Catholic Educational Association
- Newspaper: Rampage
- Yearbook: Rambler
- Website: www.billingscatholicschools.org

Billings Central Catholic High School is a private, Catholic high school in Billings, Montana, United States. It is one of three Catholic high schools in the Diocese of Great Falls–Billings.

== Background ==
Billings Central Catholic opened in 1944 with its first class graduating in 1948. It was the first diocesan Catholic high school in the Diocese of Great Falls in eastern Montana. A new building was completed in 1947 and "Billings Central Catholic" has been located there since.

In 1987, Billings Central Catholic joined the parish schools at Holy Rosary, Little Flower, St. Pius and St. Patrick's to consolidate into one Catholic school system in Billings known as Billings Catholic Schools.

== Montana High School Association State Championships (133) ==
- Boys Baseball - 2025
- Boys Basketball – 1996, 2019, 2021, 2026
- Boys Cross Country - 2001
- Boys Football - 1956, 1968, 2007, 2012, 2018, 2024
- Boys Golf - 1971, 1973, 1978, 1993, 1994, 2003, 2015, 2026
- Boys Soccer - 2009, 2024, 2026
- Boys Swimming - 2004, 2005, 2006, 2010, 2011, 2012, 2013, 2014, 2015, 2017, 2018, 2019, 2021, 2022, 2023, 2024, 2025, 2026
- Boys Tennis - 2007, 2009, 2013, 2014, 2015, 2016, 2017, 2022
- Boys Track and Field - 1999
- Boys Wrestling - 1965
- Drama - 1982, 1983, 1984, 1985, 1986, 2011
- Girls Basketball - 1985, 1986, 1987, 1990, 2010, 2012, 2020, 2024, 2025
- Girls Cross Country
- Girls Golf - 1977, 1978, 1983, 1984, 1985, 1992, 2003, 2008, 2009, 2010, 2024, 2025
- Girls Gymnastics - 1976, 1977, 1978, 1980, 1981
- Girls Soccer - 2008, 2009, 2010, 2011, 2012, 2013, 2015, 2016, 2018, 2022, 2024
- Girls Softball - 1994, 1995
- Girls Swimming - 1997, 1998, 1999, 2010, 2011, 2012, 2013, 2014, 2015, 2018, 2020, 2021, 2022, 2023, 2024, 2025, 2026
- Girls Volleyball - 1987, 1988, 2009, 2017, 2018, 2020, 2021, 2022, 2024, 2025
- Girls Tennis - 2017, 2022
- Girls Track and Field - 1993, 1994, 1995
- Girls Wrestling
- Speech and Debate - 1983, 1984, 1993, 1996, 2004

== Notable alumni ==
- Auggie Smith, comedian
- Marcus Wehr, college football offensive guard for the Montana State Bobcats
