= Jerome B. Wheeler =

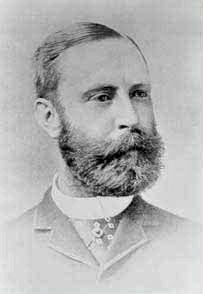
Jerome B. Wheeler

Jerome B. Wheeler was president and partner of R. H. Macy & Company in New York City and was an owner of mines, a hotel, and other businesses in Colorado.

== Early life ==
Jerome Byron Wheeler was born September 3, 1841, in Troy, New York, to Daniel Barker Wheeler and Mary Jones Emerson, both of Massachusetts. His mother was a second cousin of Ralph Waldo Emerson. His family moved to Waterford, New York, when Wheeler was young. He attended public school there until the age of 15. He obtained a clerical position in 1856. From 1857 to 1861 he pursued mechanical trades "which may have included engineering, mechanical, or machine shop work."

== Civil War ==
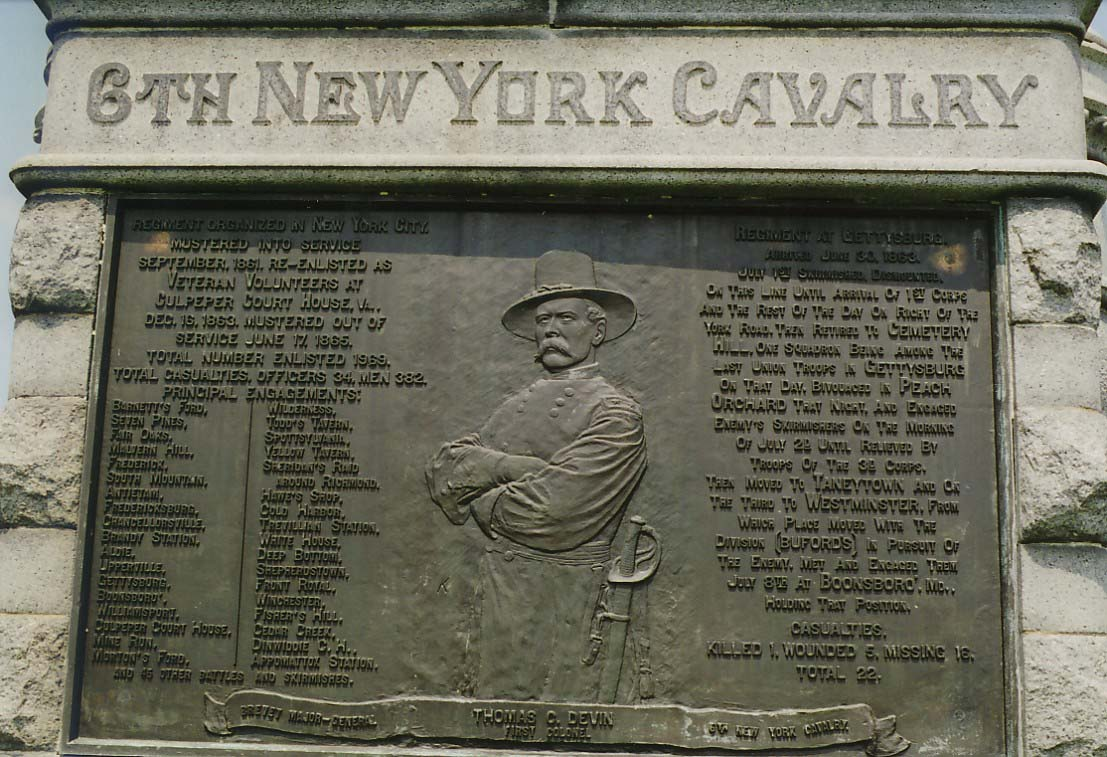
6th Regiment New York Volunteer Cavalry, Colonel Thomas Devin

Wheeler enlisted as a private in the 6th Regiment New York Volunteer Cavalry on his 20th birthday and at the beginning of the Civil War. He trained in Staten Island, New York, and was stationed in Washington, D.C., before obtaining his horse with the rest of the regiment in Cloud Mills, Virginia. The regiment fought throughout the Shenandoah Valley and during General George McClellan's Peninsular campaign. Wheeler was made second lieutenant under Colonel Thomas Devin and moved up the ranks and was made a colonel. Going against the "wishes of his superiors", Wheeler brought supplies to a group of starving Union Army soldiers who were positioned behind enemy lines. Considering the effort too dangerous, his rank of colonel was "reputedly" revoked. He mustered out of the army in September 1865.

== New York ==
After the war, Wheeler returned to Troy, New York and worked as a bookkeeper. Wheeler moved to New York City about May 1866 and took a clerical position at John F. Barkley and Company, a grain merchant. He worked at Holt and Company, a large flour and grain commission house, starting in 1869 as a bookkeeper. He had several positions before becoming a full partner in the firm after 10 years at the firm.

Wheeler married Harriet Macy Valentine in 1870. She was a descendant of Thomas Macy, one of the first European settlers in Nantucket, and niece of Rowland Hussey Macy who founded the R.H. Macy and Company, which became a large department store in New York City. In 1879, a few years after Rowland Hussey Macy's death, Charles Webster brought Wheeler in to be a 45% partner in the purchase of the department store. He remained a partner until 1888, when there was stiff competition from other department stores with fruitful advertising campaigns.

Wheeler died in Colorado in December 1918. He is interred at Woodlawn Cemetery in the Bronx, New York City.

== Colorado ==
In 1883, Wheeler visited Colorado and "fell in love with the Colorado mountains".

=== Aspen ===
Wheeler decided to invest in "productive mines" in Aspen and Leadville. Within Aspen, Wheeler purchased mines and built a tramway to bring ore down the mountain where it was processed in a smelter he built at the base of the mountain. The smelter was owned by the Aspen Smelting Company. Wheeler was president of the Croseus Gold Mining and Milling Company. He spent nearly one million dollars each to build the Hotel Jerome and the Wheeler Opera House. He also invested in the Colorado Midland Railway and in 1885 became a director of the organization. In 1888, Wheeler had the Wheeler-Stallard House built, but never lived in the home.

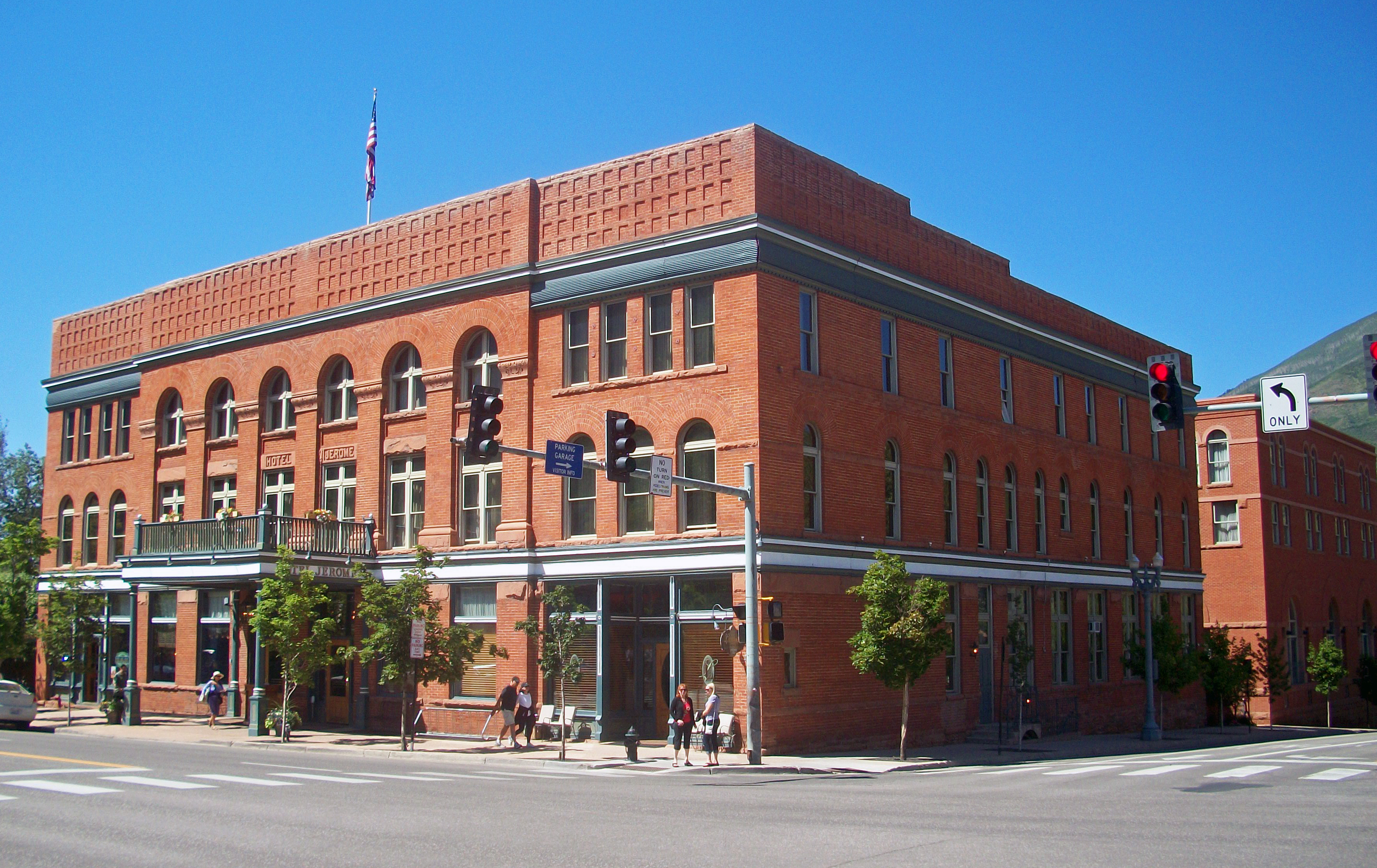
Hotel Jerome

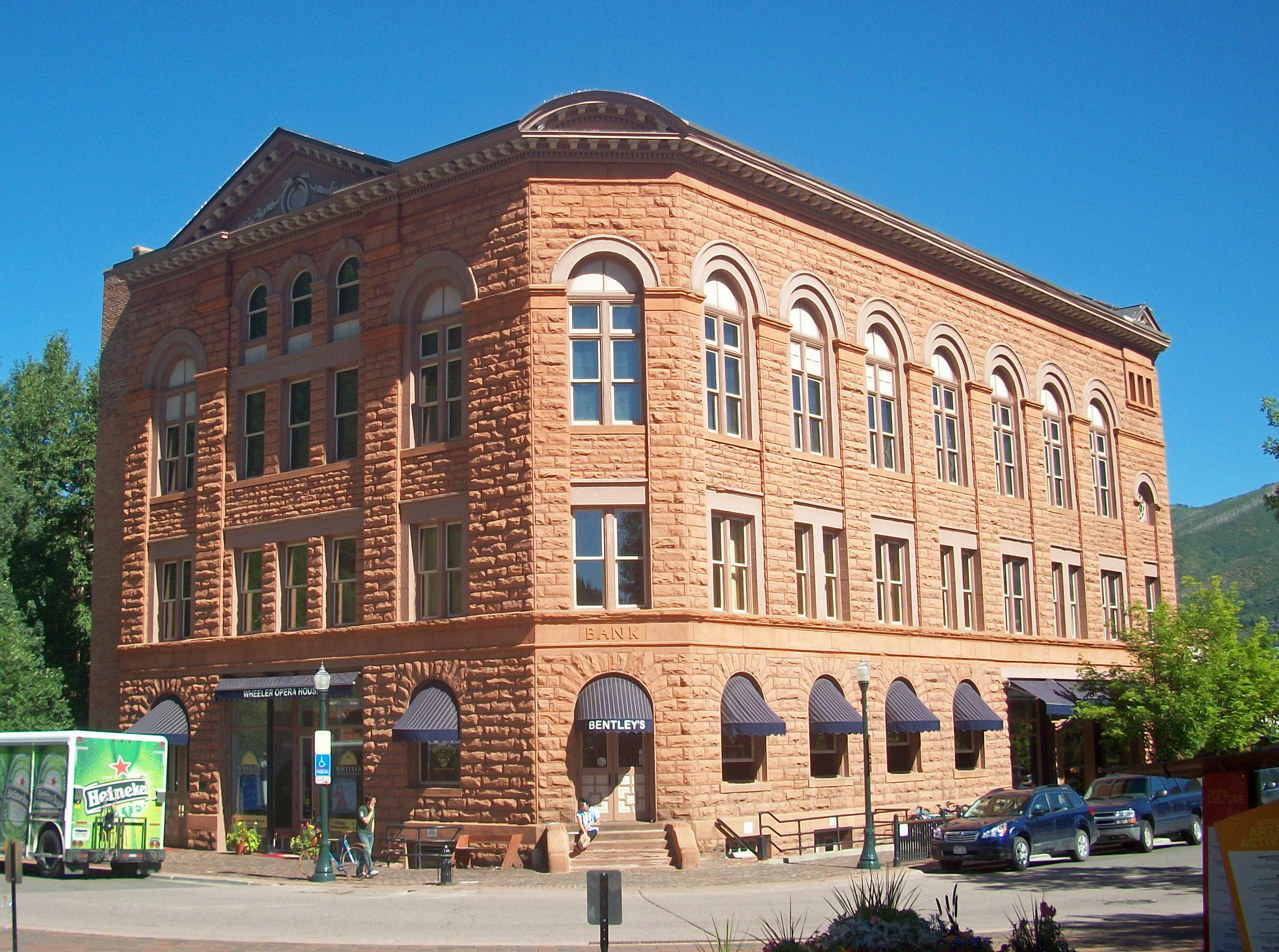
Wheeler Opera House

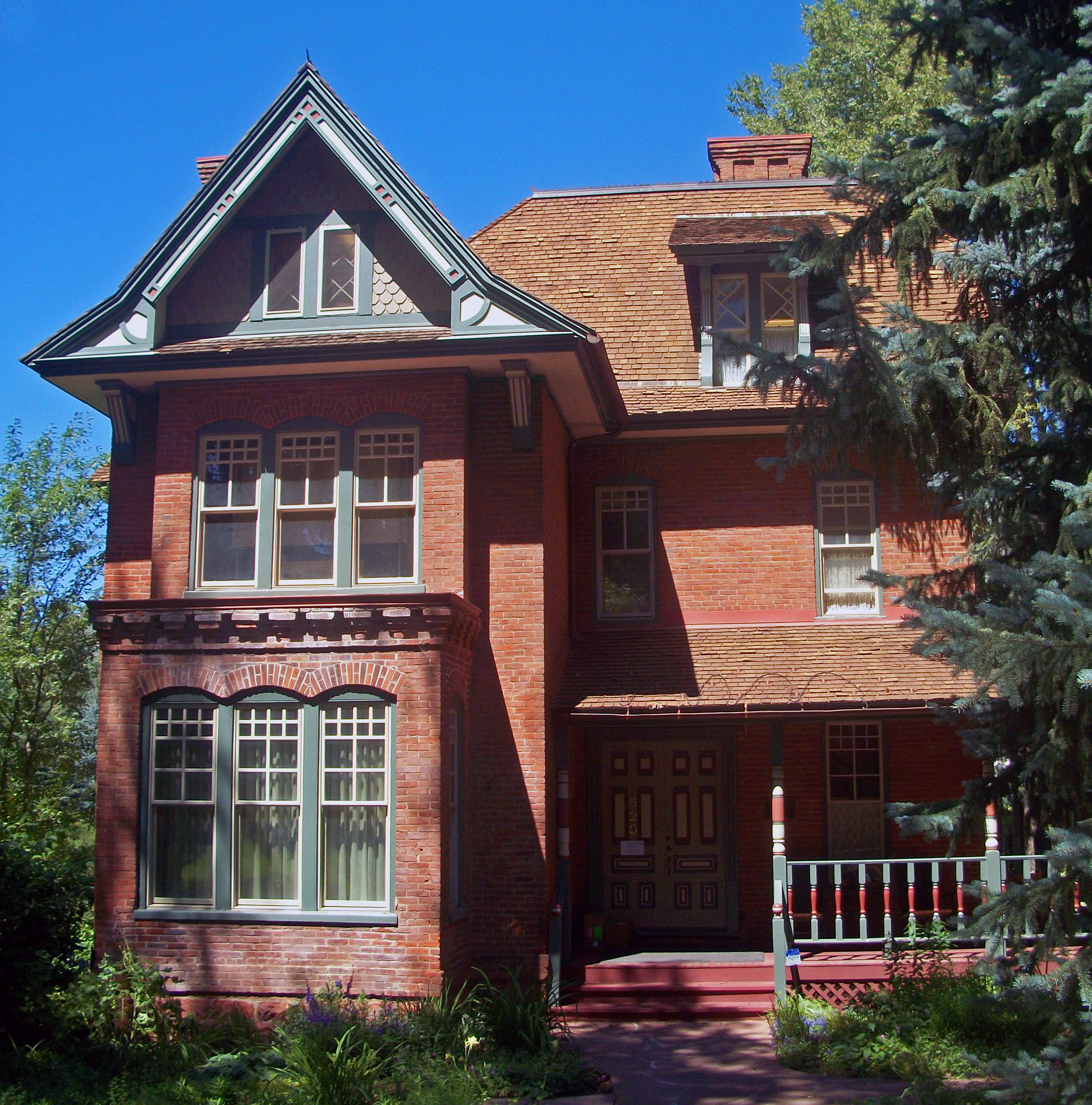
Wheeler-Stallard House

=== Leadville ===
Wheeler was president of the Rock Hill Consolidated Gold and Silver Mining Company.

=== Manitou Springs ===
Wheeler moved to Manitou Springs, Colorado, in an effort to improve his wife's health. She had a severe case of bronchitis. Wheeler built the Wheeler Bank in 1888, the town's first financial institution, and the Manitou Mineral Water Company, which bottled and shipped mineral water across the country, including New York's Waldorf Astoria Hotel.

In 1893, Wheeler built the Windemere estate in Manitou Springs, which included a conservatory, coach house, billiard rooms and bowling alley. He invested in the Manitou and Pike's Peak Railway, a cog railway that transported passengers to the top of Pikes Peak.

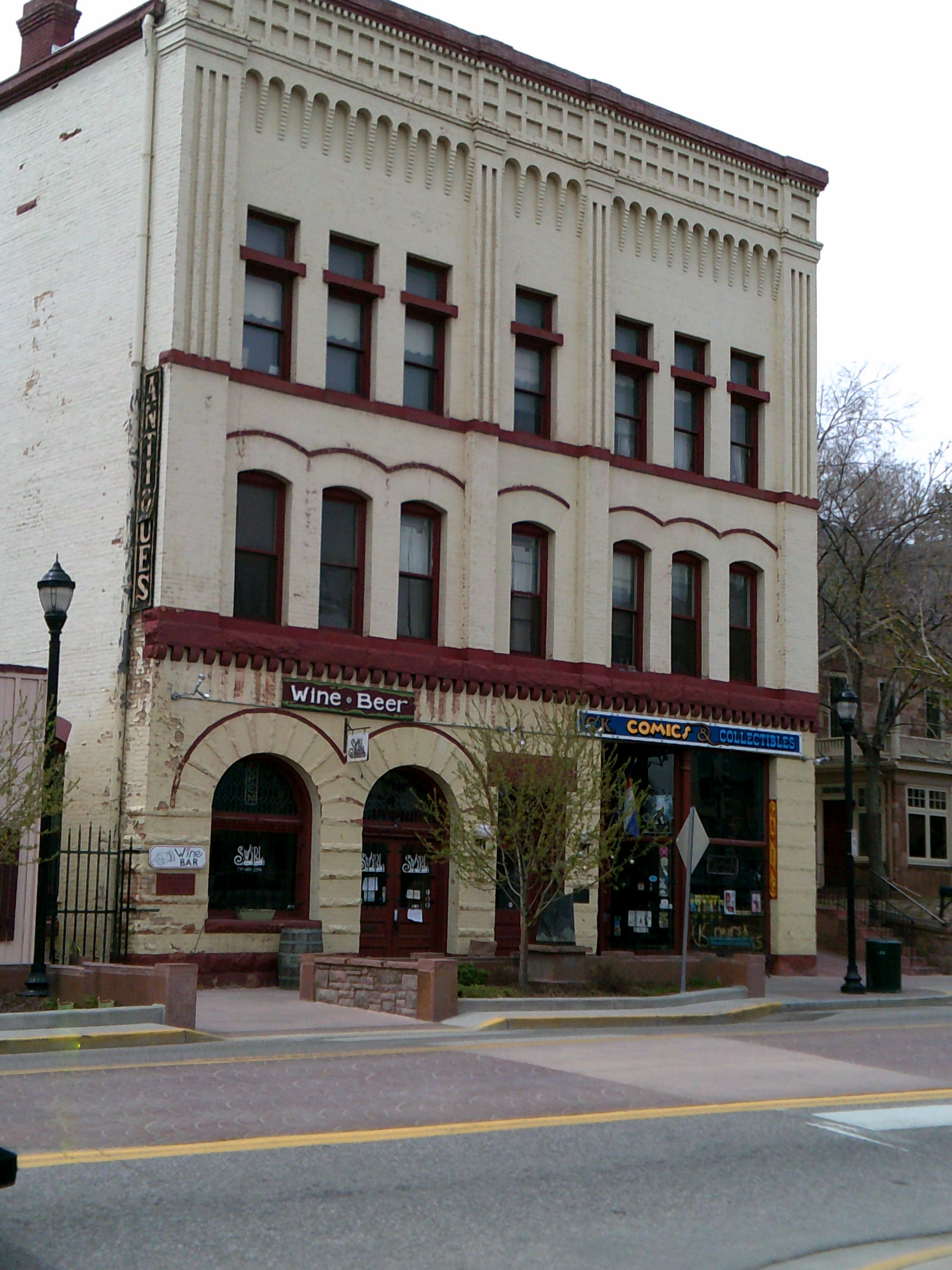
Wheeler Bank building

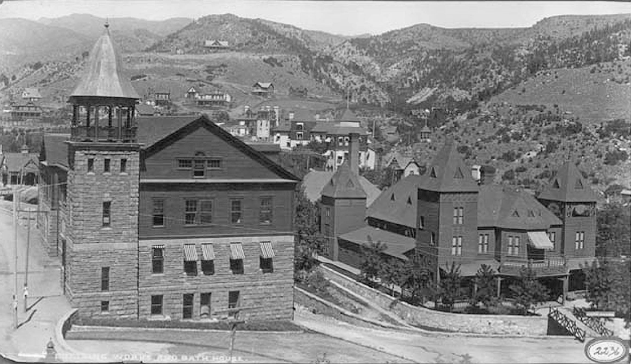
Manitou Mineral Water Bottling Plant (left) and Manitou Bathhouse

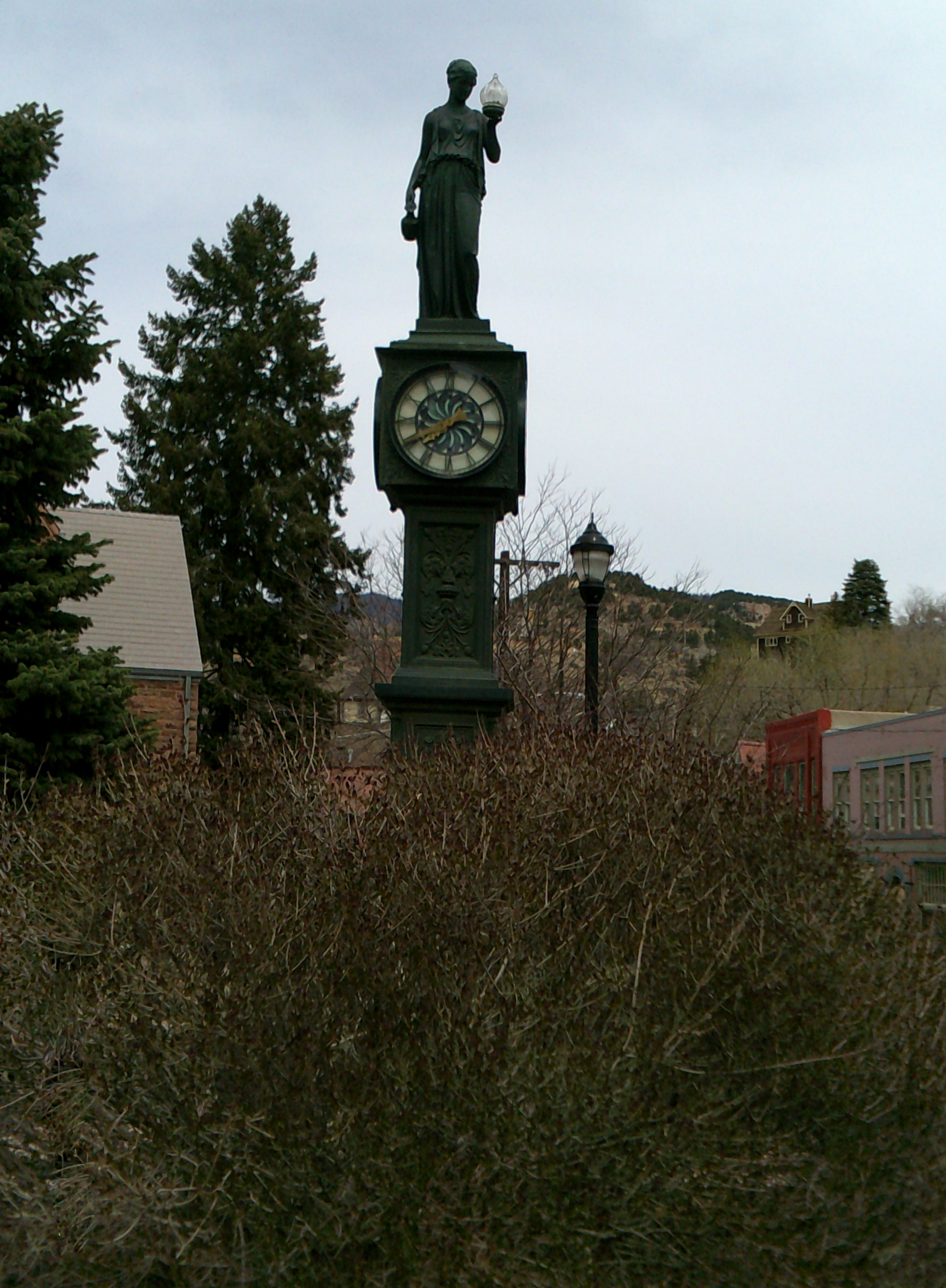
Wheeler Clock

== Financial fortune ==
Wheeler's mines in Leadville and Aspen made about $5 million in the 1880s. Much of his fortune was lost in the economic depression of 1893.
