= Wheeler Bank =

Historic building in Colorado, US

- U.S. National Register of Historic Places
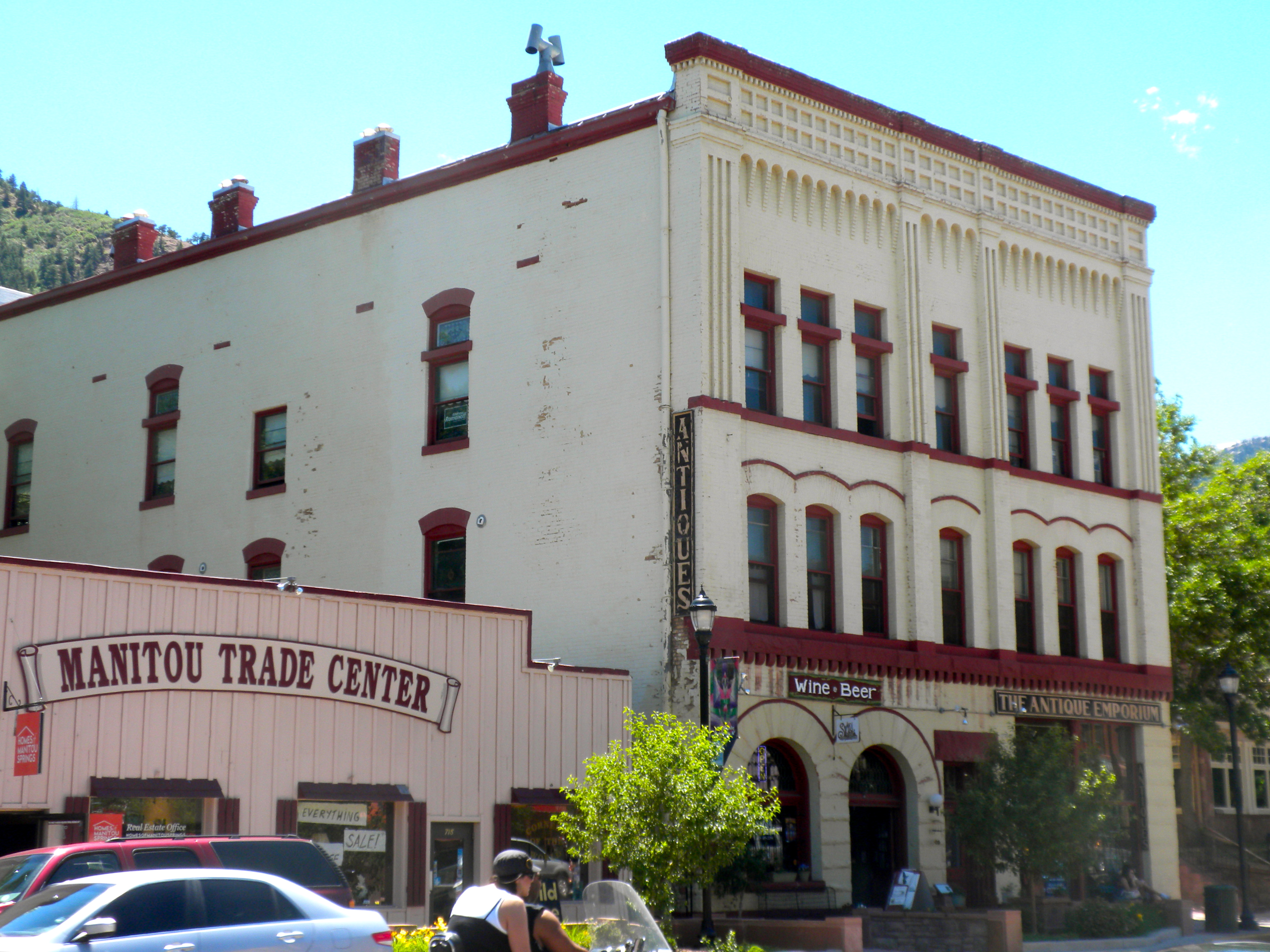

- Location within Colorado Location within the United States
- Location: 717-719 Manitou Avenue, Manitou Springs, Colorado
- Coordinates: 38°51′25″N 104°54′54″W
- Architect: MacFarlane & Co.
- Architectural style: Romanesque and Italian Villa
- NRHP reference No.: 80000898
- Added to NRHP: 1980

Wheeler Bank is a historic building located on Manitou Avenue in Manitou Springs, Colorado built by Jerome B. Wheeler. It is on the National Register of Historic Places. Over the course of its history, the building has been a financial institution, auditorium and retail business.

== Building ==
Built in 1888 for Jerome B. Wheeler, a Colorado mining baron and financier, the building was Manitou Springs's first bank.

The building is a combination of Romanesque Revival and Italian Villa architectural styles. The first floor shows two different facades. For the 717 Manitou Avenue address, there are heavy arches, with a half-circle leaded glass window at the top of each arch. The facade for the other half of the building, with the 719 Manitou Avenue address, is a recessed storefront. Between the two is an entry to the stairway to the second and third floors. The second- and third-floor facades are symmetrical across the two halves of the building, with windows set in a 3-1-3 pattern across both floors. The interior of the third floor spans both buildings and was originally an opera house; it has since been converted to an apartment. The red brick exterior, as of 2013, was painted a cream-buff color with red trim.

== Jerome B. Wheeler ==
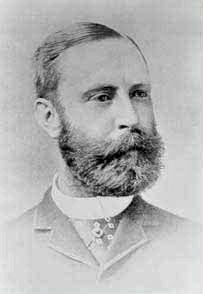
Jerome B. Wheeler

Jerome B. Wheeler operated a bank in one half of the first floor. The other first floor business was a dry goods store operated by N.O. Johnson & Son. Offices were located on the second floor and an opera hall, called Wheeler Hall or Opera Hall, was on the third floor. The bank closed during the Panic of 1893. It later reopened and was a bank until 1922. The financial institution became the Bank of Manitou in a new building on Manitou Avenue.

Wheeler made several donations to the town of Manitou:

- $50,000 towards Manitou Avenue construction
- Provided equipment for the volunteer fire company
- Donated the Wheeler Clock at Manitou and Canon Avenues
- Provided $10,000 for repairs following a "devastating" flood of 1913

== See also ==
- Manitou Springs Historic District
- List of Manitou Springs Historic District buildings
