= Aspen RooftopComedy Festival =

Festival held 2008–2010

Coordinates: 39.18917°N 106.81972°W

The Aspen RooftopComedy Festival was a stand-up comedy festival that was held annually in Aspen, Colorado on or around the Memorial Day Weekend since 2008. The festival is the concept of Roxane Davis and the City of Aspen. Davis, a consultant and producer, created the partnership between rooftopcomedy.com and Aspen's Wheeler Opera House, a historic theater located in downtown Aspen.

The Aspen RooftopComedy Festival was designed to fill the gap left by HBO canceling the US Comedy Arts Festival, which had been held in Aspen from 1985 to 2007. HBO has since renamed the festival and relocated it to Las Vegas, Nevada. 2008 marked the inaugural debut of the Aspen Rooftop Comedy Festival as a replacement to the former HBO event.

RooftopComedy.com brought the focus of the festival towards an underground talent base and an online media focus, and The Wheeler Opera House ensured that the festival transitioned to an event for the Aspen community by offering affordable tickets and local discounts on festival passes. Whereas the HBO/U.S. Comedy Arts Festival had evolved into primarily an industry event, the producers of the new festival committed to creating a community for developing unproven comics, as well as presenting comedy for a devoted live-comedy audience.

The festival ran for three editions, being followed in 2011 by the Aspen Laff Festival.

== 2008 festival details ==
Performers

- Dave Waite
- Paul Varghese
- Mike E. Winfield
- Kevin Camia
- Geoff Tate
- Vladimir McTavish
- Chris Porter
- Vince Morris
- Robert Hawkins
- Tyrone Hawkins
- Andi Smith
- Isaac Witty
- Lisa Landry
- Auggie Smith
- John Ramsey
- Matt Braunger
- Erin Foley
- Robert Buscemi
- Nathan Trenholm
- Lamar Williams
- Tig Notaro
- Steve Wilson
- Mike Lukas
- Jimmy Dore
- Tim Ball

Other Highlights

- Industry Panel: Comedy meets New Media

A cross-section of new media and comedy industry leaders discuss how the Internet is impacting the comedy business, and how comedians are harnessing new media strategies to further their careers. Participating Panelists are below. The discussion was moderated by RooftopComedy.

- Mark Day, Comedy Content Manager, YouTube
- Dylan Gadino, Editor-in-Chief, PunchlineMagazine.com
- Allison Kingsley, Executive Producer/GM, Bushleague.tv
- Mike Kwatinetz, General Partner, Azure Capital Partners
- Kevan O'Brien, Digital Film and Video Specialist, Adobe

- 2008 RooftopComedy Awards

Awards were presented to comedians and those working in the field of online comedy who "are doing exciting, innovative and, yes, hilarious things."

- Matt Braunger - Best of the Fest
- Robert Hawkins - Rooftop Comics' Comic
- Auggie Smith - Rooftop Clubs' Comic of the Year
- Tyrone Hawkins - The Rooftop Golden Shingle
- The Rooftop Rusty Nails
  - Matt Bearden
  - Jonathan Pace
  - Tabari McCoy
  - TJ Young
  - Albert Im
  - Jeff Wesselschmidt
  - Tim Harmston
  - Andy Erikson
- Eddie Gossling - The Roofie
- Go Bananas in Cincinnati, OH - Best Club for Emerging Talent
- Go Bananas in Cincinnati, OH - Best Club to Work
- MySpace Comedy Forum - Best Online Comedy Forum
- Punchline Magazine - Best Online Industry Publication
- Never Not Funny with Jimmy Pardo - Best Comedy Podcast
- Michael Showalter Showalter - Best Sketch Comedy News Parody Shows
- The Onion News Network - Best Comedy Web Shows and Series

- National College Comedy Competition Finals

The Finals of the NCCC featured the top 4 students in the categories of Stand Up and Short Film from across the US competing for the title of Funniest College Student.

- Tim Ball from Duke University won in the Stand Up Category.
- Dan Perrault from Emerson College won in the Short Film Category with Car Phone.
