= Auggie Smith =

American comedian

- Born: Kevin Smith; 1970 (age 55–56); Santa Rosa, California
- Occupation: Stand-up comedian
- Years active: 1989-present
- Website: www.auggiesmith.com

Auggie Smith is an American comedian. He has released three albums, most recently Taste The Lightning on Stand Up! Records in 2023, and has toured nationally.

The Billings Gazette called him "one of the most underrated comedy stars of his generation."Stage Time magazine called him "one of the most brilliant voices in comedy today." In 2010, he became the first comedian to win both the San Francisco and Seattle Comedy Competitions in the same year.

== Early life ==
Kevin "Auggie" Smith was born in 1970 in Santa Rosa, California. After his parents divorced, he moved with his mother, a social worker, to Billings, Montana, where he grew up. He is Irish Catholic. His childhood comedy influences included Bobby Slayton, George Carlin, Johnny Carson, Saturday Night Live, and Fozzie Bear.

Smith graduated from Billings Central Catholic High School in 1989. He was president of the speech team in high school, and has also said that he was politically liberal and raised as a Democrat. A teacher suggested stand-up as a career, and he began performing at open mics in Billings just after high school.

== Comedy style ==
Smith's comedy has been described as "dripping with sarcasm" and "intelligently written, manic rants delivered in a seamless rapid-fire style." In his early career, before developing his more well-known persona, Smith had a more sedate performance style, dressed in a suit and influenced by Norm Macdonald. He developed his loud, ranting style as a way to compete with the noise in the bars where he was performing.

Smith's comedy is often topical and skewers pop culture. His jokes also deal with political topics such as freedom of speech and civil rights. "The ax I'm grinding now is basically a very long defense of political correctness," he told an interviewer in 2016. "It's just about human decency, so in the end it is easy to defend." His material refocused as his family circumstances changed after having children, with more jokes about family life and being a father.

== Career ==
Smith moved to Chicago after high school to begin his comedy career, and soon relocated to Portland, Oregon, where he lived for most of his early career, as well as some time in Los Angeles and New York City. He has been based in Los Angeles since the 2010s.

In 1994, Smith won the Sam Adams Comedy Contest in Boston, which led to his national television debut with a set on the A&E series An Evening at the Improv later that year.

Smith has been a frequent guest on the syndicated radio program The Bob & Tom Show since 2004, and has also headlined the program's sponsored stand-up comedy tours. Smith told one interviewer that the extended interviews typical of the program, with comics often sitting in for the entire multi-hour broadcast, helped him build a fanbase throughout the Midwest by letting audiences get to know him: "You're not only doing jokes, you're talking about your personal life. So people listening have an investment in you as a human being, not just some anonymous guy on TV."

Besides his 2010 wins at the San Francisco and Seattle Comedy Competitions, Smith finished second in the 1997 Seattle competition, losing to Mitch Hedberg. (Past Seattle winners include Hedberg, Kermet Apio, and Darryl Lenox. Past San Francisco winners include Dana Carvey, Sinbad, Jake Johannsen, and Doug Stanhope.)

In 2008, Smith won the Club Favorite award at the Aspen RooftopComedy Festival. Smith was a finalist at the 2009 Boston Comedy Festival and Great American Comedy Festival. He has also performed at the Montreal Comedy Festival, Bridgetown Comedy Festival, Laughing Skull Festival, Garden Fresh Laugh Detroit Comedy Festival, the Sturgis Motorcycle Rally. and the Las Vegas Comedy Festival.

In 2012, Smith helped co-found the Big Sky Comedy Festival in Billings, Montana. He regularly co-hosts the festival's annual two-team stand-up competition.

=== Recordings ===
Smith's first comedy album/DVD, 2003's Cult Following, was recorded in Portland. The album received heavy airplay on XM and Sirius satellite radio.

Smith's second album, 2011's Smell the Thunder, was recorded between 2007 and 2011 at gigs in Kansas City, Boise, and Dayton, Ohio. The website Comedy Reviews wrote positively about Smell the Thunder, praising Smith's sense of comic pacing and calling him "a fun comedian, very likable," who becomes "so fired up by the inanity that is modern existence, and so tired of the mixed messages that permeate pop culture, he works himself into a red-hot frenzy." Comedy Reviews also named Smell the Thunder in its list of the best comedy albums of 2011. Laughspin reviewer John Delery called Smell the Thunder "derisive, incisive and clever" and compared Smith's "devilishly wicked comic voice" favorably with Lewis Black.

Smith is signed to Minneapolis comedy label Stand Up! Records. In 2023, Stand Up! released his third album, Taste The Lightning, as well as re-releases of Smell the Thunder and Cult Following. The album cover for Taste The Lightning was created by Spanish fantasy painter Maren.

=== Television and film appearances ===
Smith's first national TV performance was the A&E series An Evening at the Improv in 1994.

In 2006, Smith headlined the first episode of Comedy Central's series Live at Gotham.

Smith appeared on the fifth season of the reality show Last Comic Standing in 2007, jokingly complaining that the show was unfair to bald comics like himself.

Smith and fellow comedian Greg Warren made several videos in 2007 for the website Funny or Die.

He appeared in director and comedian Jordan Brady's 2014 documentary I Am Road Comic, about the lives of traveling stand-up comics.

He has a cameo as himself in the 2015 Montana-shot independent film My Favorite Movie.

=== Podcasting ===
In 2013, Smith launched the podcast Motivationally Speaking, which featured Smith interviewing fellow comedians.

Smith has also been a frequent guest on the podcast Probably Science.

== Personal life ==
Smith was married in 2011, at age 41. He and his wife have three children.

== Discography ==
- Cult Following (self-released, 2003; re-released by Stand Up! Records, 2023)
- Smell the Thunder (Rooftop Comedy, 2005; re-released by Stand Up! Records, 2023)
- Taste the Lightning (Stand Up! Records, 2023)
