= The Comedy Festival =

American Art festival

- Genre: Comedy festival
- Locations: Las Vegas, Nevada; Aspen, Colorado
- Years active: 1995–2008
- Founded: 1995

The Comedy Festival, formerly known as the US Comedy Arts Festival, was a comedy festival that ran from 1995 to 2008. The festival included stand-up comedy performances, appearances by the casts of television shows, and has a film component called the Film Discovery Program.

== History ==
The first 13 editions of the US Comedy Arts Festival were held annually at the Wheeler Opera House and other venues in Aspen, Colorado. The primary sponsor of the festival was HBO, with co-sponsorship by Caesars Palace (the primary venue), TBS, GEICO Insurance, Twix candy bars and Smirnoff Vodka. In-between, HBO had started a spin-off version simply named The Comedy Festival, which was held in Las Vegas, Nevada, since 2006, in collaboration with the Anschutz Entertainment Group.

The Aspen event folded in 2007 once HBO exited the festival business, considering the expenditures too high. American comedian Chris Fleming performed at the 2007 event.

TBS picked up the Las Vegas event in 2008, and organized a follow-up edition that year, also arranging for other comedy festivals in collaboration with Just for Laughs. In turn, Aspen replaced the festival with similar events, the Aspen RooftopComedy Festival and the Aspen Laff Festival.
