= Freedom State =

- Directed by: Cullen Hoback
- Written by: Cullen Hoback (Based on an original story concept by Aaron Kirk Douglas)
- Produced by: Aaron Kirk Douglas
- Starring: Megan Murphy; Harry Lessinger; Richard Garfield; Dax Jordan; Katie Bailey; Jim Craig
- Cinematography: Shawn Sundby, Chief Cinematographer/Director of Photography
- Edited by: Cullen Hoback
- Music by: Greg Ives
- Production company: Aaron Douglas Enterprises in conjunction with Film Action Oregon (a nonprofit fiscal sponsor)
- Distributed by: Film Baby (worldwide DVD distribution) 2007, IndieFlix (worldwide digital distribution) 2010
- Release date: March 9, 2006 (Cinequest Film Festival)
- Running time: 58 minutes
- Country: United States
- Language: English

Freedom State (2006) is a short independent narrative film written and directed by Cullen Hoback (based on a concept by the film's producer, Aaron Kirk Douglas). The story follows the exploits of eight patients relegated to a mental health facility who find they've been abandoned by their only nurse and left to their own conclusions (the apocalypse has happened). The film's ensemble cast includes American actor/comedian, Dax Jordan.

== Plot summary ==
A woman named Krystal, unhappy with her husband and her life, checks into a small rural "mental health home." Her problem? She may just prefer "crazy," as a state of mind (and lifestyle) to life "out there." When her fellow residents (also institutionalized mental patients) discover that Nurse Garrett, the facility supervisor, has disappeared, the television is out, and there's a suspicious glass eye made in Rapture, Indiana, they come to the only possible conclusion — the apocalypse (specifically, "The Rapture") has happened and the world has ended.

Led by Krystal, who has been voted "President," most patients decide to embark upon the quest to search for other "survivors," taking on their new respective roles in and finding a sense of purpose through imagination. Their search takes them on a short but whimsically eccentric road trip via an old repurposed school bus, driven by the home's former security guard. Armed with only their "short bus," and their shared delusions, they must seek out survivors, rebuild society, and find the edge of the world.

In the end, exhausted from their journey, they all return to the home where Dax (Krystal's love interest) has decided he will not "check out" of the facility after all. The patients symbolically bury various objects in a grave and voice contempt for Nurse Garrett. Krystal then burns a photo of her husband. And Nurse Garrett finally returns to the home, where the patients, frustrated by her disappearance, pummel her with cornbread. Krystal declares that she has decided she wants both "crazy," and "love."

== Cast ==
- Megan Murphy as Krystal
- Harry Lessinger as Dex
- Richard Garfield as Bosco
- Dax Jordan as Midge
- Katie Bailey as Eloise
- Jim Craig as Chuck
- Hunter Rose Teal as Velvet
- Ry Sherrell as Frederick
- Agrippa Williams as Bernie
- Payam Karamooz as Ted
- Nine DeJanvier as Denise
- Suzanne Owens-Duval as Nurse Garitt
- Matt Ludwick as Cloud
- N. Michael Acker as Diver
