= Wheeler Opera House =

1887 historic building in Colorado, US

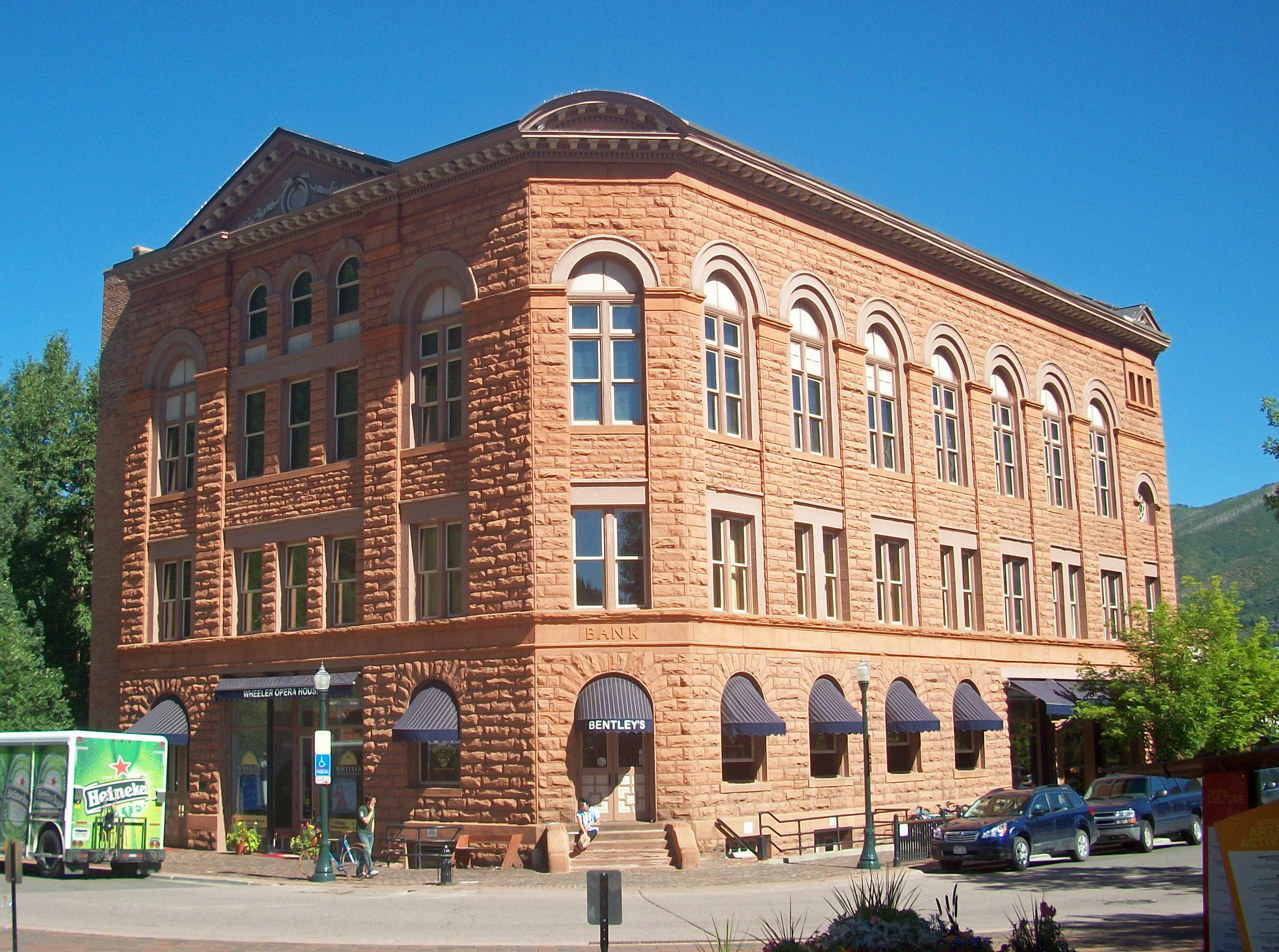
- South elevation and west profile, 2010
- Interactive map of Wheeler Opera House
- Address: 320 E. Hyman Avenue; Aspen, Colorado; US
- Coordinates: 39.18917°N 106.81972°W
- Owner: City of Aspen
- Capacity: 503
- Designation: NRHP# 72000276

Construction
- Opened: 1889
- Closed: 1913–50
- Rebuilt: 1950, Herbert Bayer
- Years active: 1889–1912, 1950–present
- Architect: Willoughby J. Edbrooke

Website
- http://www.wheeleroperahouse.com/

The Wheeler Opera House is located at the corner of East Hyman Avenue and South Mill Street in Aspen, Colorado, United States. It is a stone building erected during the 1890s, from a design by Willoughby J. Edbrooke that blends elements of the Romanesque Revival and Italianate architectural styles. In 1972 it became the first property in the city to be listed on the National Register of Historic Places, and the second in Pitkin County. (Note: Osgood Castle in Redstone was listed on the Register in 1971, a full year before the Wheeler.) The upstairs auditorium hosts a number of events every year, ranging from nationally prominent music and comedy acts and some of the Aspen Music Festival's events to productions by local community groups.

It is one of two buildings in town named after early developer Jerome B. Wheeler. Originally, the opera house was located on the third floor, with retail space at street level and professional offices on the second floor. An early 20th-century arson fire damaged the interior, and in its wake the theater fell into disuse. The building became property of the city due to tax default. Later in the century it was renovated several times, twice from designs by Herbert Bayer, to bring it back into full use. For a while the Pitkin County Library was located in the building as well.

Today it houses retail space and a restaurant in addition to the auditorium space, and is one of Aspen's most prominent landmarks. The city funds its operations through a real estate transfer tax that has built up a large surplus over the years. The Comedy Festival, then known as the HBO/US Comedy Arts Festival, was held in the building annually from 1985 to 2007. Among the performers who have appeared at the Wheeler are Lily Tomlin, Renée Fleming, Phish, John Denver and Bill Maher. Kate Hudson made her debut there as an elementary school student. Michael Hutchence's last official live recording with INXS was also recorded at the Wheeler, within a year of his death.

== Building ==
The Wheeler is located on the northwest corner of the intersection, located roughly in the center of Aspen. To the south and east Hyman and Mill have been closed to vehicular traffic; both are now planted with shade trees and serve as pedestrian malls. The surrounding neighborhood is densely developed with a mixture of modern and historic buildings, none taller than two stories, giving the Wheeler unchallenged domination of the skyline. To the west is a vacant lot. The terrain is level, with the lower slopes of Aspen Mountain and the ski area's base facilities several blocks to the south.

The building itself is a five-by-seven-bay structure three stories tall, topped by a hipped roof. All three visible facades are faced in rusticated peachblow sandstone; the west and north sides are done in plain brick. The two-bay main entrance is on East Hyman Street, in the center of the south facade. An auxiliary entrance is located at the top of a short flight of steps in the corner facade. At the north end of the west facade is a three-bay glass storefront with entrance. A small addition, containing a stairwell, protrudes from that corner to the north. On the west end of the front facade is a narrow blind brick addition.

=== Exterior ===
All the windows on the first floor have round segmental arches, sandstone voussoirs and awnings. Above them a small continuous cornice sets off a plain frieze with the word "Bank" in relief above the door on the corner facade. Another, larger continuous cornice atop the frieze sets off the second story. Its windows are all trabeated single-pane double-hung sash with granite lintels and a broad plain surround; all except the center bays on the south are set in slight recesses that rise to an arched top on the third story. Those middle bays are set with three single windows in a larger recessed area.

On the third story all the arches are blind with triple-hung single-pane sash, accentuated by contrasting lighter stone. On the west end of the south facade, and the second and third from the south on the east facade, the upper window panes are blind as well. The northernmost bay on the east facade is set with a smaller oculus. The arches have smooth finishes.

Another cornice above a plain frieze serves as the arches' springline. From it in the center of the south story rise three smaller round-arched windows, triple-hung with the lower panes blind. Their surrounds have keystones. On either side of the three, a section of cornice and plain frieze coincides with the arches' springline to suggest the top of a pilaster. Above the windows is another wide plain frieze. Just below it, in the northernmost bay of the east, is a group of three small windows.

The roofline has a denticulated pressed-tin cornice below broad overhanging eaves. The middle section of the south facade has a pediment with similar cornice. Within its recessed entablature is a blind oeil-de-boeuf. The corner facade has a much smaller segmental semicircular top, and a very small pediment tops the northernmost bay on the east facade.

=== Interior ===
Inside, the first story is given over to storefronts and the box office. The second story has back stage dressing rooms and the theater lobby, painted in Venetian plaster with a mural showing the building. Both interiors have been extensively renovated. In the rear is a fire stairway and elevator to make the theater accessible. A stairway with red carpeting and imitation wood balustrade leads from the entrance to the auditorium. On display is the walk-in safe Jerome Wheeler bought for the bank he had founded that once occupied the first floor.

The 503-seat auditorium is located on the third story, which rises to twice the height of the other two. Renovated since its construction, it combines its original period design with some modernist elements. Seats are surfaced in Moroccan leather. The walls are decorated in an elaborate pattern of azure and teal and salmon rise to a curved coffered ceiling, done in azure with silver stars amid intersecting imitation wood, from which a chandelier hangs. At the north end is the stage with a maroon-and-gold proscenium and red velvet curtain. Above it is an emblem with Roman legionnaires' helmets and lutes. The south windows offer an unobstructed view of the mountain, flanked by box seats.

A curved wooden balustrade sets off the balcony, supported by salmon-colored cast iron Corinthian columns. Two small side stages, decorated in Lincrusta–Walton paneling with a geometric design, flank the main stage at this level. Behind the stage are dressing rooms and a crossover to allow actors to change sides of the stage during a performance without being seen by the audience. This space also gives access to the fire stair and elevator.

== History ==
The history of the Wheeler parallels that of Aspen. Established with much fanfare during the city's initial boom years in the late 19th century, it fell into decline along with much of the rest of Aspen's buildings when the silver market crashed. Restoration efforts began in the mid-20th century, as Aspen became established as a ski resort town, and the affluence that attracted in turn produced more money for further restoration efforts.

=== 1888–93: Initial construction during Silver Boom ===
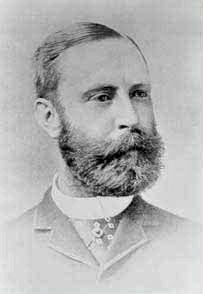
Jerome Wheeler

First established in 1879 as Ute City, a rough settlement of log cabins on a plain high in the Roaring Fork Valley, Aspen grew quickly when silver was found in abundance in the nearby mountains. During the Colorado Silver Boom of the 1880s, its population soared and it soon incorporated as a city. One of those attracted to the city was Jerome Wheeler, a Civil War veteran who had married a Macy's heiress. For a few years in the late 1870s he ran the department store chain after several major partners died.

In 1883, the Wheelers moved to Manitou Springs, Colorado, to ease Mrs. Wheeler's ill health with mountain air. Jerome Wheeler heard about the silver strikes in Aspen, across the Continental Divide, and invested in four of the mines. By 1888 he was so involved in mining that he sold his Macy's interest and moved to the boomtown.

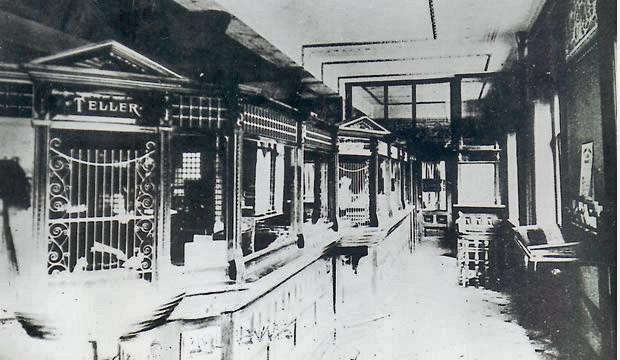
Wheeler Bank, on the first floor

With the lucrative returns on his mining investments, he financed two monumental buildings that bear his name and remain standing: the Hotel Jerome, Aspen's most prominent landmark to travelers passing through on what is now State Highway 82, and the opera house, at the city's center. The ground floor housed Wheeler's bank, a barber shop and a clothing retailer. The second floor was office space, used by the bank, a mining company, a lawyer and a dentist. On the tall third story, higher than any other building then in Aspen, was the theater.

Denver architect Willoughby J. Edbrooke designed a building that combined a basic Romanesque Revival form with some Italianate decorative touches. It was built in ten months from June 1888 to April 1889 at a cost of $100,000 ($3.58 million in contemporary dollars). Aspen had been the first city west of the Divide to be wired for electricity, and the theater's chandelier took advantage of that with 36 separate lights.

The anticipation of its opening was such that local milliners ran advertisements in Aspen's newspapers telling customers they were too overwhelmed to take new orders. Satin programs had been scented with rose water several days. The opening night production was The King's Fool, presented by the Conried Opera Company. The Aspen Daily Times praised the building as "a perfect little bijou of a theater."

Aspen grew larger and more prosperous the following year when Congress passed the Sherman Silver Purchase Act, mandating federal purchases of the metal. The population swelled to almost 10,000, the greatest ever. The Wheeler became a stop on a popular touring route called the Silver Circuit, working its way from Denver through Leadville, over the Divide and through Aspen to Utah and eventually ending at Cheyenne, Wyoming. Along it audiences got to see everything from Shakespeare and classical music to vaudeville and boxing.

=== 1893–1950: Neglect, fire and public ownership ===
That era ended with the Panic of 1893. Congress repealed the Silver Purchase Act, and mines closed overnight as demand dropped. Jerome Wheeler was forced into bankruptcy. The theater he had built became a lot less busier.

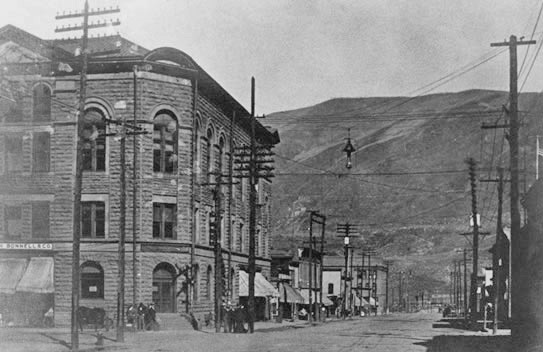
Wheeler in early 1900s

Aspen entered a period of its history known as the Silent or Quiet Years. The population declined quickly as silver mining retreated to a much smaller role in the local economy. Ranching and potato farming took on more importance, but could not make up for the prosperity silver had provided. Within the city many very new buildings from the boom years fell empty and neglected. Some burned, unattended and unextinguished, or succumbed to decay from the effects of an intense annual five-month winter at 8,000 feet (2,400 m) above sea level. The Wheeler survived primarily by showing movies, as that medium emerged.

After one of those shows, in 1912, a fire was discovered in the space between the stage floor and the dressing rooms (then located beneath). It was extinguished with minimal permanent damage and the theater was able to show another movie the following night. A week and a half later, another fire broke out in the early morning hours. Since it started in three different locations simultaneously, the cause was clearly arson. It was hot enough to melt the steel cables at the stage. The community decried the act, and the Wheeler was boarded up. The lower floors remained occupied, but it would be years before the theater was used again. In 1918, an unpaid tax bill of $1,155 ($25,000 in contemporary dollars) led to the city acquiring the building for that sum.

It did not restore the theater, however, as most of the productions that visited the city could be accommodated in Armory Hall (now City Hall). In 1930 Aspen's population reached its all-time low of just over 500, less than 10% of what it had been when the Wheeler was built. Near the end of the decade some visitors, particularly Europeans who helped to train the "soldiers on skis" of the Army's Tenth Mountain Division in the area, saw the city's potential for recreational Alpine skiing.

=== 1950–70: Restoration and preservation ===
After World War II ended, some of the Europeans, and veterans of the Tenth, returned to Aspen to build a ski resort. They established the Aspen Skiing Company with the help of Chicago industrialist Walter Paepcke and his wife Elizabeth. The Paepckes, instrumental in the rebirth of the city, attracted major cultural figures to it with a 1949 festival to celebrate the bicentennial of the birth of German poet Johann Wolfgang von Goethe. The couple also started the Aspen Music Festival the same year. This was part of what they called the "Aspen Idea": a community where residents could "earn a living, profit by healthy physical recreation, with facilities at hand for [their] enjoyment of art, music, and education."

While planning these events, the Paepckes discovered the Wheeler and its neglected, debris-strewn auditorium. They led a community effort to clean it up and restore it. Austrian architect Herbert Bayer, who the Paepckes had hired to design promotional materials for Aspen, designed a minimalist reconstruction that used Japanese lanterns strung across the stage as lighting and a bare stage. While this was enough to allow Lowell George to make live radio broadcasts and an informal concert by folk musician Burl Ives, it was nowhere near what the theater needed, and due to structural concerns the only events it could host in wintertime were movie screenings. A fire escape had to be placed on the front facade as well.

As a result of the Paepckes' efforts, Aspen continued to grow in popularity during the 1950s. The first renovations to the Wheeler were rapidly proving inadequate. Again, the couple commissioned a redesign from Bayer. This more comprehensive effort mixed elements of Bayer's Bauhaus background with the Victorian flourishes of Edbrooke's original design. The box seats next to the stage were converted into side stages, the ceiling completely restored and the benches replaced with seats from an old movie theater. The walls were painted a deep red shade with a fleur de lys motif.

=== 1970–83: Rehabilitation and festivals ===
Aspen's continued increase in popularity attracted more year-round residents, among whom were celebrities like John Denver and Goldie Hawn. Their presence, and the success of the music festival, attracted more artistic and cultural organizations to the city. Space for them to present remained limited. At one point during the 1970s the Pitkin County library was housed on the building's second floor. The wintertime restrictions on the auditorium remained in effect.

It was apparent that the Wheeler, which would soon be a hundred years old, was in need of a comprehensive renovation that would address all the structural issues. The Music Festival led the many groups lobbying for some way of financing the effort. In 1979 the city council levied an 0.5% real estate transfer tax on all transactions within the city to fund the renovations. It took effect at the beginning of the following year, to remain in effect until 2000.

William Kessler & Associates received the commission for the $4.5 million project. In 1982 money from the transfer tax was used to purchase the adjacent vacant lot for a proposed expansion. Kessler's modernist design, however, was ridiculed as an incongruous and unsympathetic "waving flag" and later dropped amid much community opposition.

Within the building, much was accomplished in addition to the structural restoration. The box seats, curtain and proscenium arch were restored to their original appearance. Actual dressing rooms were built, along with a crossover behind the stage. The second story was finally established as the lobby and the corner space at street level was set aside for a bar. To its west, the entry space was converted into a box office, which the building had previously lacked. A passenger elevator was built to make the theater wheelchair accessible. That allowed the addition of an interior fire stair, which in turn led to the much-desired removal of the fire escape. A restaurant, Bentley's, opened in the ground floor space where the Wheeler Bank had once been, with an art gallery in the corner space. Both businesses leased the space on an annual basis at below-market rates; the proceeds were used by the city to fund an annual arts grant program.

Upon its completion in 1984, the rehabilitation was not as perfect as had originally been hoped. The lot next door remained vacant, a reminder of an expansion that could have been. The new box office's entrance was directly in the path of winds blowing down from the mountain, making it especially cold in winter. The lobby could only accommodate half of a capacity audience. And the removal of the fire escape had required the addition of an incongruous bump on the north facade.

These issues were overlooked when it came time for the grand reopening in May of that year. Festivities kicked off with a week of free tours of the new building. Performers included pianist James Levine, cellist Lynn Harrell, the Denver Repertory Theatre Company and the MOMIX dance troupe. As a link to the building's past as Aspen's major movie house, the 1928 silent film classic The Wind was shown, with full orchestral accompaniment and its star, Lillian Gish, by then 90, in attendance.

External image
- Photo from April 17, 1986 Aspen Times by Devon Meyers, showing "Katie Hudson" at left as Little Alice

=== 1984–present: Festivals and acclaim ===
With the theater now fully capable of hosting all types of performances year-round, it became a popular venue. The Music Festival continued to hold many of its annual performances there. Audiences at productions in the mid-1980s were among the first to hear lyric soprano Renée Fleming when she was a student in the Music Festival's opera program. John Denver, an Aspen resident, made many appearances whenever he was in town. The private Aspen Community School mounts its annual production there. In 1986 Goldie Hawn's daughter Kate Hudson made her stage debut there in a production of Alice in Wonderland.

Standup comedy, coming into its own in the 1980s, helped put the reborn Wheeler on the national map when HBO chose it as the location for its annual U.S. Comedy Arts Festival in 1985. For the next 13 years comics would do their routines before the cable network's cameras on its stage. Among those who got early exposure at the festival were Bill Maher, Dave Chappelle, Lewis Black and Margaret Cho. Well-established names in comedy also played the Wheeler—in the late 1980s, Lily Tomlin previewed her one-woman show The Search for Signs of Intelligent Life in the Universe there for six weeks before its Broadway opening. HBO later moved the comedy festival to Las Vegas, but the Wheeler has since replaced it with two other comedy festivals: the Aspen RooftopComedy Festival, cosponsored by RooftopComedy.com, and the newer Aspen Laff Fest, run by the Wheeler on its own.

Prominent popular musicians also made appearances, two of which were recorded for live albums. Lyle Lovett played at least one show at the Wheeler every year. In February 1997, the Australian rock band INXS came to the Wheeler to warm up before its world tour later that year. Six songs recorded at that show were released on a rare limited-edition CD, INXS: Live in Aspen – February 1997. Lead singer Michael Hutchence died nine months later, making it his last official live recording. Seven years later, John Oates released a combination CD and DVD of a show of his, John Oates: Live at the Historic Wheeler Opera House. (Note: In 2010, 2011, and 2012, Oates and the Wheeler coproduced the 7908 Aspen Songwriters' Festival.)

Renovations continue. In the late 2007 the faux wood finish in the auditorium was restored. This was followed by the repainting of the lobby, in which the Venetian plaster and mural of the Wheeler were added. The transfer tax was renewed in 2000, and a strong local real estate market during the following decade left the Wheeler with $28 million in funds. A master plan calls for most of that to be spent on an expansion; however, expansion plans were suspended by Aspen City Council in December 2009.

The Wheeler was closed for most of the latter half of 2013 for long-needed renovations to its balcony area which will include a conversion of its movie technology from 35mm to full DCP (digital cinema projection), which was completed in time for its reopening in January 2014. In 2011, the venue executed a full remodel of its basement and two ground-floor lease spaces. Between these two projects, over $5 million will have been invested in renovating and preparing the venue for the next hundred years of its life.

== Management ==
The Wheeler is governed by an eight-member board. Seven of those members are appointed by Aspen City Council to three-year terms; one member is an ex officio representative from Music Associates of Aspen, which runs the Aspen Music Festival and School. The current board chair is Chip Fuller.

The executive director heads a paid staff of eleven. They are assisted by volunteers from the Aspen community. The theater is available for rent for private and public occasions, except during the period from mid-June to mid-August when it is mostly used by the Music Festival's Opera School.

== See also ==
- National Register of Historic Places in Pitkin County, Colorado
