= Bridgetown Comedy Festival =

Event in Portland, Oregon, United States

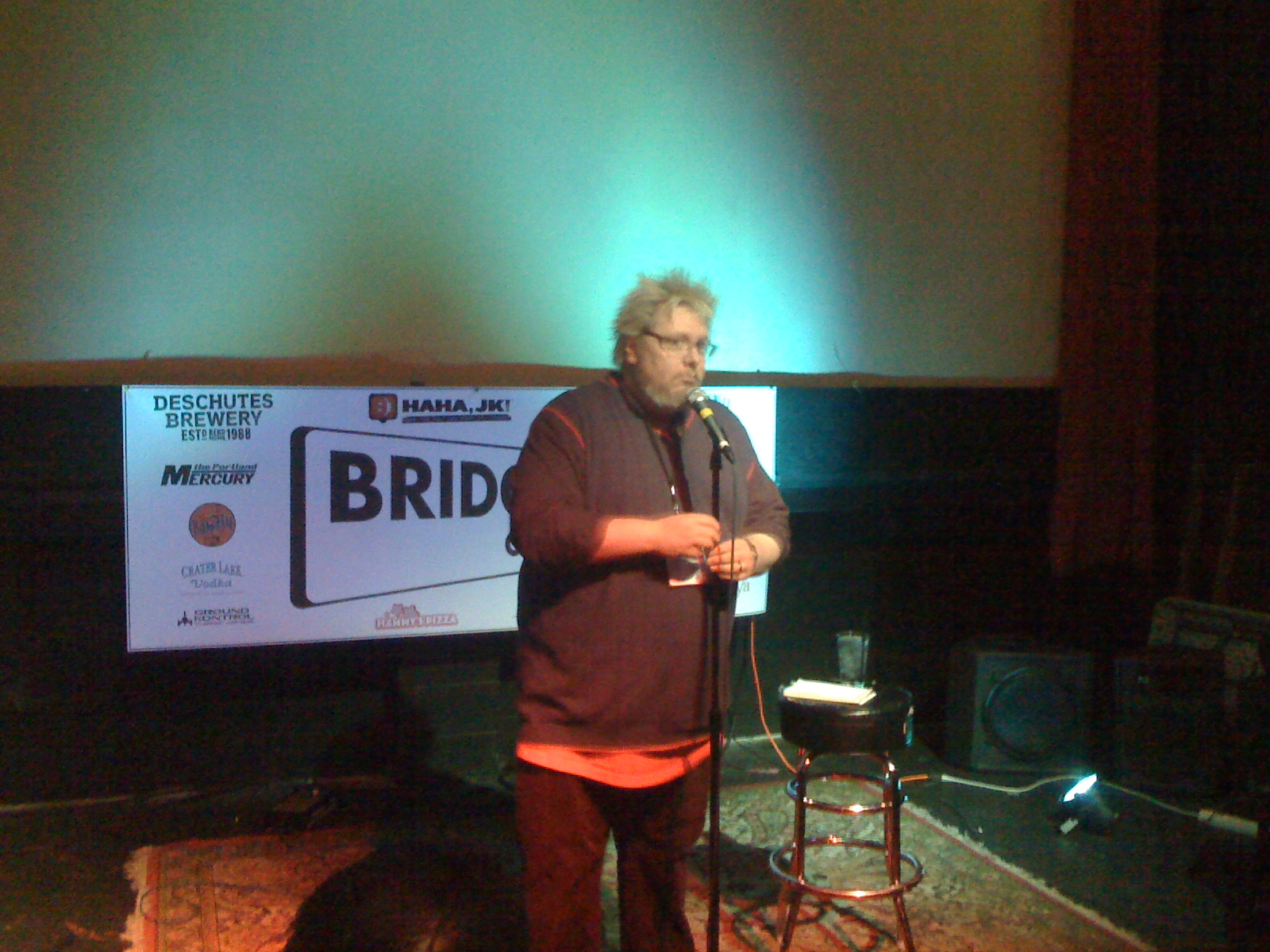
- Genre: Stand-up comedy, Sketch comedy, Improvisation, Podcast
- Locations: Portland, OR, U.S.
- Inaugurated: 2008
- Website: www.bridgetowncomedy.com

The Bridgetown Comedy Festival was a stand-up comedy festival located in the Hawthorne district of Portland, Oregon that took place every spring from 2008 to 2017, featuring standup comedy showcases, live podcasts, panel discussions and improv comedy. It was created in October 2007 by comedians Andy Wood and Matt Braunger and filmmaker Kimberly Brady.

== Reception ==
In 2010, Ben Bateman of Willamette Week newspaper called Bridgetown "the fastest-growing comedy extravaganza in America." Successively larger and better-planned comedy festivals prompted one reviewer to comment, ". . . as usual, organizer Andy Wood and his royal army of geniuses outdid themselves. How can you make something already great even better? I'm not sure, but it happened." In late 2009, the Portland Mercury reviewed the festival, stating that, "Bridgetown (or should we say, Andy Wood) is changing Portland comedy" and the following year, the Portland Monthly stated that Wood "deserves several rounds of applause for making the fest happen . . . ." In his work as a comedy promoter, Andy Wood created a venue where the comedy market was struggling, and has promoted the venue to as a regional and national event. Part of Wood's approach in creating 'draw' to a weak comedy market was to couple art with philanthropy. In 2014, Kristi Turnquist of The Oregonian wrote that "The annual event brings comedians from around the country together with some of the Northwest's top acts, for four jam-packed days of hilarity."

== Short history of the Bridgetown Comedy Festival ==
=== 2008 ===
The 2008 Festival garnered some sixty performers, headlined by actor/comedian Patton Oswalt. Other performers included Tig Notaro (comedian, The Sarah Silverman Program); Matt Braunger (founder and Portland native); Morgan Murphy (writer, Late Night with Jimmy Fallon); Natasha Leggero (comedian, Reno 911!); Dax Jordan and Chris Fairbanks (comedian, Fuel TV).

=== 2009 ===
The 2009 Bridgetown Comedy Festival was headlined by Janeane Garofalo (Saturday Night Live and The Larry Sanders Show alumnus), and featured Andy Kaufman Award-winners Reggie Watts and Brent Weinbach. It added long-form improv and podcasts to the schedule.

=== 2010 ===
The 2010 Festival featured 175 performers at nine venues and featured long-form improv, podcasts by Marc Maron and Jimmy Pardo, and comics including Maria Bamford, Tim Meadows, Scott Adsit, Tig Notaro, Greg Behrendt, Marc Maron, Christian Finnegan, Matt Besser, Matt Walsh, Matt Braunger, Danny Pudi, Steve Agee, T.J. Miller, and Hannibal Buress.

=== 2011 ===
192 performers included Margaret Cho, Fred Armisen, Kristen Schaal, Andy Dick, Simon Helberg ("The Big Bang Theory"), Oscar Nunez ("The Office"), Aparna Nancherla and Doug Benson.

=== 2012 ===
Comics included Dave Holmes, Doug Benson, Eric Andre, Erin Jackson, Howard Kremer, James Adomian, Jimmy Dore, John Roy, Mary Lynn Rasjkub, Mary Mack, Matt Besser, Matt Braunger, Matt Kirshen, Pete Holmes, Ron Funches, Sean Patton, Steve Agee, Tim Meadows, and Todd Glass.

=== 2013 ===
Performers included Dana Gould, Reggie Watts, Todd Glass, Moshe Kasher, Greg Behrendt, Kurt Braunohler, Robert Popper, Peter Serafinowicz, Myq Kaplan, Baron Vaughn, Kurt Braunohler, Moshe Kasher, Howard Kremer, Nato Green, Matt Braunger and Baron Vaughn. In 2013 Filmmakers Adam Smith and Shannan Hunt started shooting a documentary about the festival which is still unreleased.

=== 2014 ===
Performers included Reggie Watts, Paul F. Tompkins, Emo Phillips, W. Kamau Bell, Paul Provenza, Carrie Brownstein, "Community" creator Dan Harmon, Aparna Nancherla, Ian Karmel, James Adomian, Nathan Fielder, festival co-founder Matt Braunger, Dwight Slade, and Nathan Brannon.

== See also ==
- Culture of Portland, Oregon
