= Mary Mack (comedian) =

American stand-up comedian (born 1975)

- Born: July 25, 1975 (age 51); Minnesota, U.S.
- Notable work: Comedy Central's Live at Gotham (2008); Dry Bar Comedy; Golan the Insatiable (2013–2014); Aqua Teen Hunger Force (2013); Last Comic Standing (2014); Conan (2016–2018); Last Call with Carson Daly (2017); Solar Opposites (2020–2025); Kiff (2023–present)
- Spouse: Tim Harmston

Comedy career
- Years active: 1996–present
- Medium: Stand-up comedy
- Website: www.marymackcomedy.com

Mikelle Budge, known professionally as Mary Mack (born July 25, 1975), is an American comedian, musician, and writer. Mack starred as Jessica "Jesse" Opposites in the animated sitcom Solar Opposites, which debuted May 8, 2020 on Hulu/Disney+. She has released seven albums of her stand-up.

== Early life ==
Mack was born in Minnesota to parents from Duluth and raised near Webster, Wisconsin.

She has a bachelor's degree in music from the University of Wisconsin-Oshkosh, and an MFA in conducting from Middle Tennessee State University. She taught music at the elementary and middle school levels in Oshkosh, Wisconsin, and Nashville, Tennessee, and led a polka band in Nashville before moving to Minneapolis, Minnesota, to pursue a career in comedy.

== Career ==
Mack describes herself as a "folk humorist," using storytelling and her strong northern-Wisconsin accent as part of her comedy, playing off of the Fargo stereotype of Midwesterners in a way that Mack has described as blending Gilda Radner and Garrison Keillor. Chris Spector of Midwest Record notes that the seeming innocence of Mack's "little-girl voice and demeanor ... gives Mack an edge. Mack's zingers hit harder since she lulls you into this place where you just don't expect it." A classically trained musician with two degrees, she often plays mandolin as part of her act. She has performed at SF Sketchfest, the Vancouver Comedy Fest, the Andy Kaufman Awards, and the Just For Laughs Festival in Montreal.

=== TV and radio appearances ===
Before Solar Opposites, in which she voices Jessica Wearsprada "Jesse" Opposites, Mack voiced the character Dylan Beekler in the first season of Golan the Insatiable making a guest appearance as a drunken Zeeble in Aqua Teen Hunger Force, and voicing Renée in a recurring role in Kiff. Mack's other TV appearances include Last Comic Standing in 2014, Conan, Comedy Central's Live at Gotham, and Last Call with Carson Daly.

Mack has been featured on WTF with Marc Maron, The Bob & Tom Show, XM's National Lampoon Comedy Radio, Wits, and Minnesota Polka Spotlight.

=== Discography ===
Mack has released seven albums of her stand-up. Jake Kroeger of the Comedy Bureau called her 2015 album Pig Woman "especially mischievous and fun" with a "down-to-earth, Midwestern zeitgeist". Richard Lanoie of the Serious Comedy Site called the album "an absolute hoot" and "absolutely fearless".

- Either You Wake Up or You Don't (2007)
- Pinch Finger Girl: A Tragedomedy (2009)
- "Happy Father's Day" (digital single, 2009)
- Pig Woman (Stand Up! Records, 2015)
- Mrs. Taco Man (2019)
- Comedy Bootleg 2020 (2020)
- All Ages (2021)
- Perm Day (2022)

=== Video games ===
- Doobie Dooper – Trover Saves the Universe
- Jessica Wearsprada "Jesse" Opposites – Warped Kart Racers

== Personal life ==
Mack is married to fellow comedian Tim Harmston; they frequently tour together.
