= Tim Harmston =

American stand-up comedian (born 1971/72)

- Born: 1971 or 1972 (age 54–55)
- Notable work: The Late Show With David Letterman (2011); Last Comic Standing (2014)
- Spouse: Mary Mack

Comedy career
- Years active: 2002–present
- Medium: Stand-up comedy
- Website: www.timharmston.com

Tim Harmston is a stand-up comedian from Minneapolis. He competed on Last Comic Standing in 2014, and has performed on The Late Show With David Letterman and Comedy Central's Live at Gotham. Star Tribune critic Jay Boller wrote that Harmston combines "the cadence of Brian Regan and the observational absurdism of Jim Gaffigan." He has released two albums on Stand Up! Records, The Most Bees Ever and The Whim of Tim.

== Early life ==
Harmston grew up in Menomonie, Wisconsin. He worked in the Chicago film industry before pursuing a career in comedy.

== Career ==
Harmston began performing stand-up in 2002, and won Minneapolis comedy club Acme's Funniest Person in the Twin Cities contest in 2003.

In 2011 Harmston self-released his debut album The Most Bees Ever, which was re-released by Stand Up! Records in 2014. Reviewer Richard Lanoie of The Serious Comedy Site called the album "solid stand-up comedy with quite a few particularly original bits." Chris Spector of Midwest Record said that Harmston "comes on like a modern Steven Wright."

A followup album and video, The Whim of Tim, was released in 2020.

Harmston was a contestant on CMT's Next Big Comic in 2011. He won a Rusty Nail award at the Aspen RooftopComedy Festival in 2008. He originated the idea for award-winning Internet video series Chad Vader: Day Shift Manager.

== Personal life ==
Harmston is married to comedian Mary Mack; they frequently tour together.

== Discography ==
- The Most Bees Ever (2011; re-released on Stand Up! Records, 2014)
- The Whim of Tim (Stand Up! Records, 2020)
