= Renée Gauthier =

Renée Gauthier was one of the first women to be involved in surrealism.

A close friend of Benjamin Péret, Gauthier took part in the hypnotic sleep experiments organized by René Crevel in 1922–3. She contributed an account of a dream, starting “I am in a field with Jim”, to the first issue of La Révolution surréaliste in December 1924.

== Works ==
- 'Rêve' [Dream], La Révolution surréaliste, No. 1 (December 1924)
