= Howie Nave =

American stand-up comedian

- Born: Palo Alto, California, U.S.
- Website: howienave.com

Howie Nave, also known as Howard Nave, is an American stand-up comedian, radio personality, writer, and movie critic based in the resort town of Lake Tahoe, Nevada. He was recently known for incorporating music, especially guitar in his comedic performances and for his unique bagel based movie rating scale.

== Biography ==
=== Career ===
Howie Nave's career began as a musician; he later went on the road full-time where he performed at comedy clubs in the western states: The Punchline, Laughs Unlimited, The Laugh Factory, Laffs Comedy Café. In the early 1990s he appeared on the Dr. Demento Show. Before going on the road full-time, Nave opened for such acts as Howie Mandel, The Smothers Brothers, "Weird Al" Yankovic and Neil Diamond.

In 1990s Howie was working the Improv comedy clubs where he went on to run the Tahoe Improv. In addition to managing the Improv, Howie hosts a morning radio show on KRLT. which features in-studio interviews with visiting comics, local and regional politicians, entertainers that visit the Lake and people of news and media information.

Nave occasionally acts as emcee at local community fund raisers and events. In years past, he performed at the Nevada County Arts Council, Lake Tahoe Chamber of Commerce, Acent – Gay Ski Week, and the Lake Tahoe Wildlife Care.

=== Personal life ===
Howie was born in Palo Alto and raised by his father Bob Nave who had spent time in the Navy and his mother Joan Nave, a realtor. Howie Nave went to High School and College in San Jose, California and later transferred to Humboldt State University to earn a BA in music.

== Discography ==
- I Can’t Believe I Sang That (1992)
- I Want a Part Time Girl for Christmas (1990) - single
- Bearable Samples (1989)
- It Ain’t Easy Being Male/Walking in the Rain (1986) – single
- Kodiak (1982)
