= Jackie Kashian =

American comedian (born 1965)

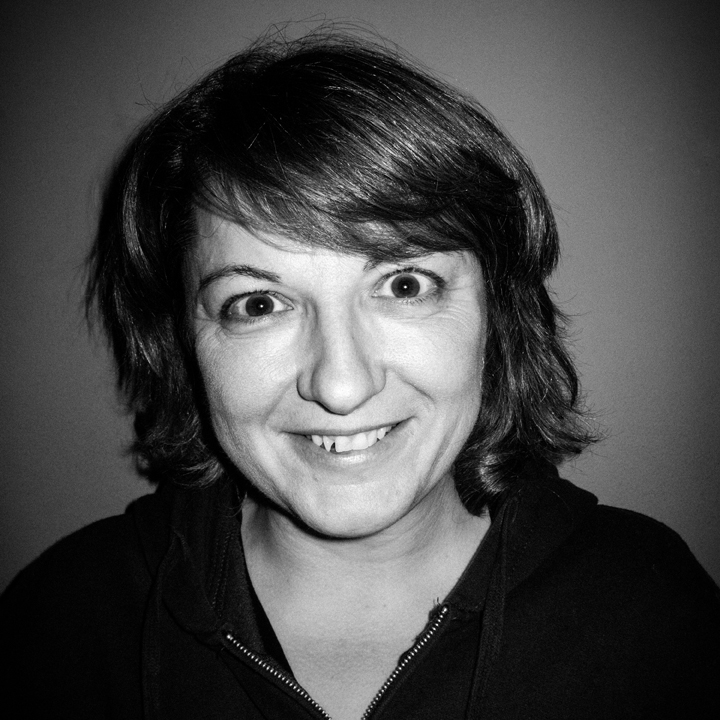
- Born: July 20, 1965 (age 61); South Milwaukee, Wisconsin, United States
- Spouse: Andy Ashcraft

Comedy career
- Years active: 1986–present
- Medium: Stand-up, Television
- Genres: Observational comedy, Alternative comedy
- Subjects: pop culture, Personal life, video games
- Website: www.jackiekashian.com

Jackie Kashian (born July 20, 1965) is an American stand-up comedian.

== Early life and career ==
Kashian, who is of Armenian and Irish descent, was born in South Milwaukee, Wisconsin and raised by her father, Elliot, and her stepmother, Nancy, along with her four older brothers and one older sister. She graduated from South Milwaukee High School in 1983.

Kashian discovered her love of stand-up comedy while attending The University of Wisconsin-Madison, and was invited to the open mic at a club operated by Bill Kinison, Sam Kinison’s, five nights a week.

She has also acted, appearing in the TV series Murphy Brown (1988) and in films such as Bam Bam and Celeste (2005) and Looking Forward: 2016 (2018).

Kashian had a half-hour special on Comedy Central and appeared on the nationally syndicated Radio/TV show Bob And Tom. She tours internationally, spending approximately 25 weeks a year on the road, and has entertained US troops stationed in Africa and the Middle East several times. Her album It is Never Going to be Bread was named as one of the top comedy albums of 2010 by Amazon.

After living in Minneapolis, Kashian moved to Los Angeles and resides in Van Nuys with her husband, Andy Ashcraft. She has a strong personal and professional relationship with Maria Bamford and they often perform together, both in Los Angeles and on the road. Kashian has also opened for Brian Regan on several occasions.

== Podcast ==
In August 2006, Kashian began hosting a podcast, Dork Forest Radio, later The Dork Forest, with new episodes being released once or twice a week. Initially on the BlogTalkRadio network and co-hosted by comedian Joe Wilson, it was for several years transmitted live from her house in Van Nuys and, after leaving BlogTalkRadio, pre-recorded in her living room for transmission. The show features "dork on dork dialog" between Kashian and her guests about their favorite obsessions—commonly referred to by Kashian as 'dorkdoms'. Guests have included Paul F. Tompkins, Jen Kirkman, James Urbaniak, Jimmy Pardo, Aisha Tyler, and Mary-Lynn Rajskub. Fans of the show refer to themselves as "Rangers Of The Dork Forest". In 2010, the podcast changed from a live format to pre-recorded, with superior audio quality and a new theme song, "Welcome to The Dork Forest", written by Mike Ruekberg. In 2011, Kashian recorded her first Dork Forest with a club or theater audience attending, with subsequent "live" episodes including those posted on August 12, 2016, and September 7, 2016.

In early 2016, Kashian and fellow comic Laurie Kilmartin began a new podcast produced by Nerdist Industries called "The Jackie and Laurie Show". The podcast later became independent and moved to the Maximum Fun network. The two primarily discuss stand-up comedy in LA and on the road, occasionally covering harassment and the unequal treatment of female comics, Kilmartin's job as a staff writer on the late-night circuit, and Kilmartin's multi-generational family living situation.

== Discography ==
- Cake Is Not My Downfall (2004)
- Circus People (2007)
- It Is Never Going to be Bread (2010)
- This Will Make an Excellent Horcrux (2014)
- I Am Not the Hero of This Story (2017)
- Stay-Kashian (2021)
- Alter-Kashian (2026)
