= Culture of Singapore =

The culture of Singapore has changed greatly over the millennia. Its contemporary modern culture consists of a combination of Asian (Malay / Tamil / Chinese) and European (British) cultures. Singapore has been dubbed as a country where "East meets West", "Gateway to Asia" and a "Garden city".

== History ==
Some of the earliest people in what is now Singapore were Austronesians that arrived between 1500 and 1000 BCE. The island then fell under various local kingdoms, which traded with other Asian countries. Singapore came under British control in the early 19th century, and following substantial immigration and economic changes became independent in the mid-20th century.

It has a populace of over 5.47 million people which is made up of Chinese, Malays, Indians, and Eurasians (plus other mixed groups) and Asians of different origins such as the Peranakan people, descendants of Chinese immigrants with Malay or Indonesian heritage.

== National character ==
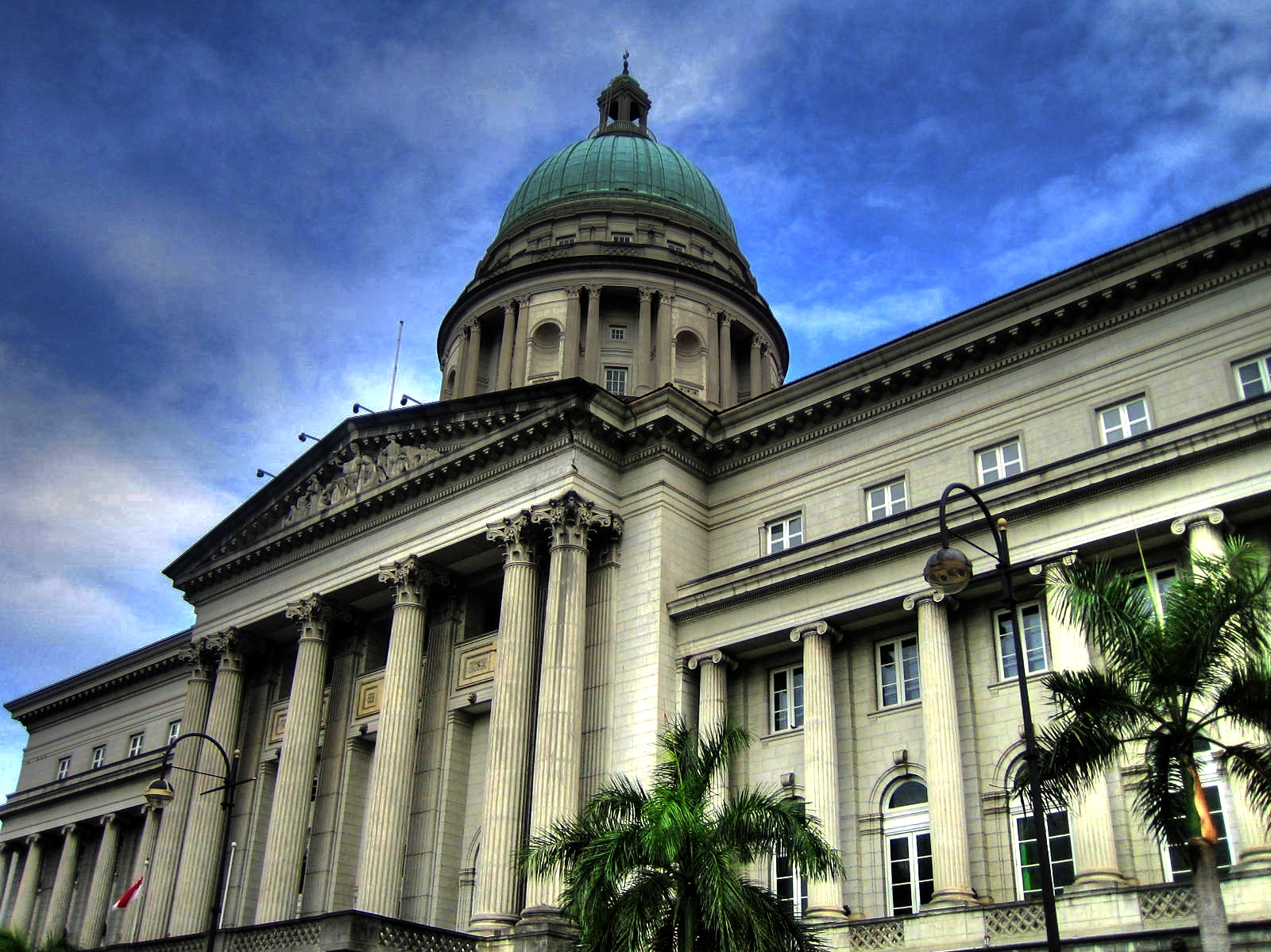
Old Supreme Court of Singapore

=== Meritocracy ===
The Ministry of Education claims that "The system of meritocracy in Singapore ensures that the best and brightest, regardless of race, religion, and socio-economic background, are encouraged to develop to their fullest potential. Everyone has access to education, which equips them with skills and knowledge to earn a better living." Primary education is compulsory for all children of age 7 to 12. Parents have to apply for exemptions from the Ministry of Education in Singapore to excuse their children with valid reasons.

=== Racial harmony ===
Singapore is a secular immigrant country. The main religions in Singapore are Buddhism, Christianity, Islam, Taoism, and Hinduism. Respect for different religions and personal beliefs is heavily emphasised by the government. Nevertheless, critics assert that the ethnic Chinese majority, which forms nearly 75% of the population, enjoys Chinese privilege over other races.

To demonstrate the importance of imparting racial harmony knowledge to the youths, schools in Singapore celebrate Racial Harmony Day on 21 July annually. Students come to school dressed in different ethnic costumes, and some classes prepare performances regarding racial harmony.

=== Democracy, peace, progress, justice and equality ===
The concepts of democracy, peace, progress, justice and equality are enshrined as stars in the Singapore national flag. Freedom in the World ranked Singapore 4 out of 7 for political freedom, and 4 out of 7 for civil liberties (where 1 is the most free), with an overall ranking of "partly free". Reporters without Borders ranked Singapore 153rd out of 180 countries in their Press Freedom Index for 2015.

== Ethnic areas ==
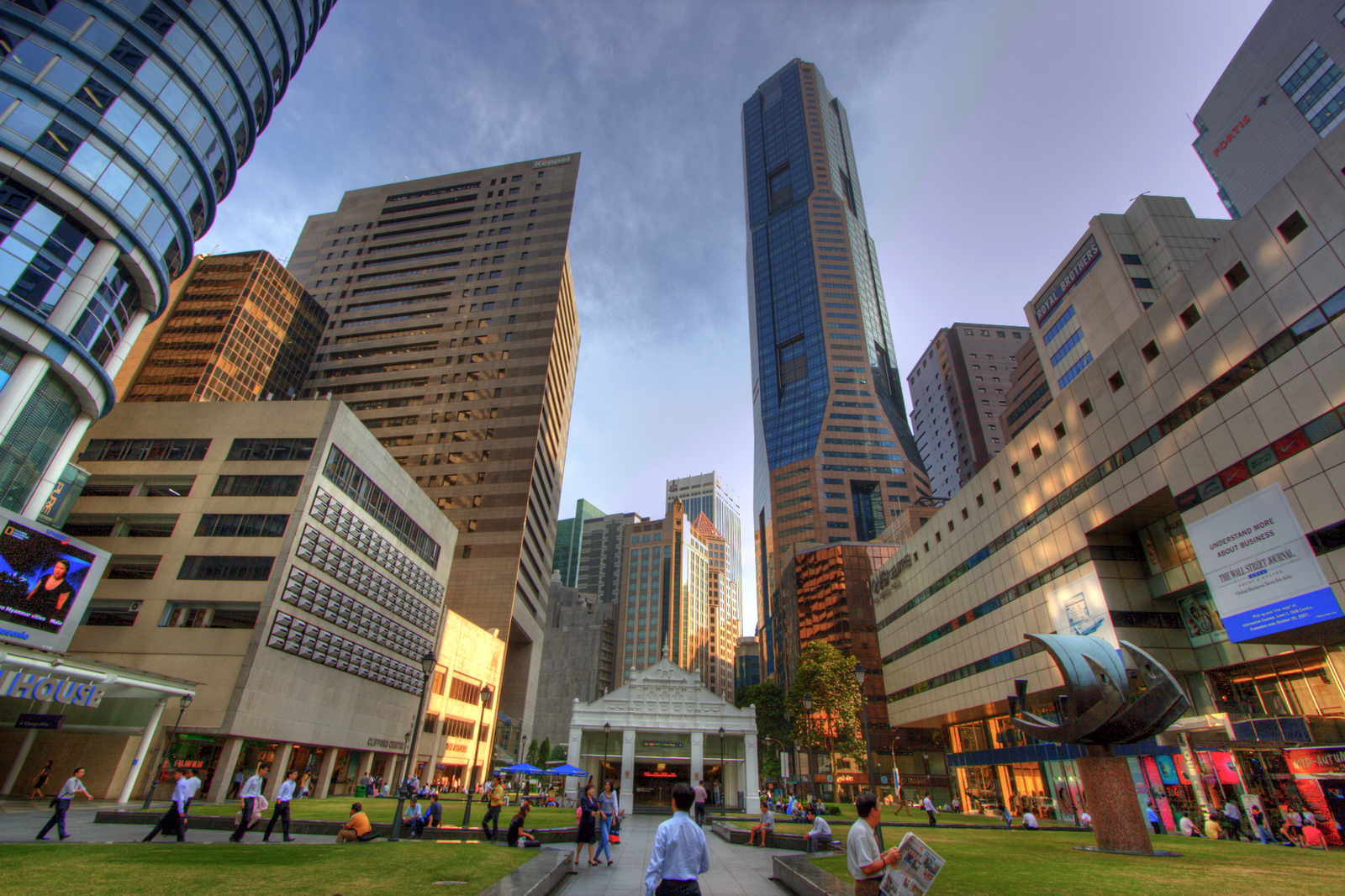
Centre square of Raffles Place

Singapore has several distinct ethnic neighbourhoods, including Katong, Kampong Glam, Geylang Serai, Chinatown, and Little India.

Both Geylang Serai and Kampong Glam are the focal points of the Malays in Singapore. A Malay Heritage Centre in Kampung Glam showcases the history and cultural exposure of the Malays, who are indigenous to the land. Both areas feature an annual month long Hari Raya Bazaar, during the fasting month of Ramadan. This is patronised by Malays and also other races.

Katong is home of the Peranakans, and the neighbourhood's identity is shaped by its unique architecture – colourful two-storey shophouses, colonial bungalows, intricate motifs and ceramic tiles. It was designated as a national heritage conservation area by the Singapore Government in 1993.

Little India is known and patronised by all races within the population for its thalis – South Indian "buffets" that are vegetarian and served on the traditional banana leaves. These neighbourhoods are accessible by public transport, especially by the Mass Rapid Transit (MRT).

Singapore's Chinatown is an ethnic neighbourhood featuring distinctly Chinese cultural elements and a historically concentrated ethnic Chinese population. Chinatown is located within the larger district of Outram.

Ethnic enclaves from the British colonial era, akin to those seen in major cities in many Western countries, are largely non-existent. The remnant "enclaves" such as Little India, Chinatown and Kampong Glam are now mainly business hubs for their respective ethnic groups and preserved for historic and cultural reasons. The Housing Development Board enforces the Ethnic Integration Policy (EIP) to "preserve Singapore's multi-cultural identity and promote racial integration and harmony" and sets proportions for each ethnic group in each housing estate.

== Art ==
Georgette Chen, Sweet Rambutans, 1965, Oil on canvas, National Gallery Singapore

From its precolonial history to present, the history of Singaporean art may include artistic traditions of the Malay Archipelago, the diverse visual practices of itinerant artists and migrants from China, the Indian subcontinent, and Europe arriving in the colonial period, such as sculpture, Portraiture, landscapes, and natural history drawings, as well as Chinese ink painting, Islamic calligraphy, Nanyang Style paintings, social realist art, abstract art, photography, and printmaking. It also includes the contemporary art practices of today, such as performance art, conceptual art, installation art, video art, sound art, and new media art. Due to Singapore and Malaysia's long shared history as British Malaya, there are many overlaps in the art histories of both countries.

The emergence of modern art in Singapore is often tied to the rise of art associations, art schools, and exhibitions in the 20th century, though this has since been expanded to include earlier forms of visual representation, such as from Singapore's early colonial period. Some of the most well-known works are of the migrant Chinese artists who painted in the Nanyang Style from the 1950s to 60s, such as Georgette Chen. The Nanyang artists characteristically depicted Southeast Asian subject matter such as tropical fruit, kampung scenes, and batik fabric while drawing upon a synthesis of Western watercolor and oil painting techniques with Chinese ink traditions. The name of the movement draws from "Nanyang" (Chinese: 南洋; pinyin: nán yáng; lit. 'Southern Ocean'), a sinocentric Chinese term used to refer to Southeast Asia from the geographical perspective of China.

Contemporary art in Singapore tends to examine themes of "hyper-modernity and the built environment; alienation and changing social mores; post-colonial identities and multiculturalism." Across these tendencies, "the exploration of performance and the performative body" is a common running thread. Singapore carries a notable history of performance art, with the state having enacted a no-funding rule for the art form for a decade from 1994 to 2003, following a controversial performance artwork at the 5th Passage art space in Singapore. Prominent Singaporean contemporary artists include, for example, Tang Da Wu, Amanda Heng, Lee Wen, Ho Tzu Nyen, and Shubigi Rao.

== Cultural policy ==
Singapore maintains tight restrictions on arts and cultural performances. Most artistic works have to be vetted by the government in advance, and topics that breach so-called out of bounds markers (OB markers) are not permitted. While the OB markers are not publicly defined, they are generally assumed to include sensitive topics such as race, religion, and allegations of corruption or nepotism in government. Nudity and other forms of loosely defined "obscenity" are also banned. Singaporean film director Royston Tan has produced movies which challenge these policies, including a movie called Cut in reference to censorship of the arts.

The country's first pre-tertiary arts school, School of the Arts, is now completed and stands along the country's prominent Orchard Road. Commenced in 2008, the school aims to provide an environment for nurturing young artists aged between 13 and 18 years. There has been much public rhetoric about liberalisation and its association with the development of a creative economy in Singapore. The response from artists, academics, public intellectuals, and civil society activists has ranged from strongly optimistic to deeply pessimistic, as reflected in the chapters written for edited book Renaissance Singapore: Economy, Culture, and Politics. The difference between what is "culture" and what makes up "the arts" has been a matter of some debate in Singapore. For an attempt at defining what is artistic, see, for example, the Report of the Censorship Review Committee 1992.

== Cuisine ==
In Singapore's hawker centres, for example, traditionally Malay hawker stalls also sell Lingnan-Chinese and Tamil food. Chinese stalls may introduce Malay ingredients, cooking techniques or entire dishes into their range of catering.

Singaporeans also enjoy a wide variety of seafood including crabs, clams, squid, and oysters. One favourite dish is the chilli crab, commonly sold at stalls selling seafood.

== Festivals ==
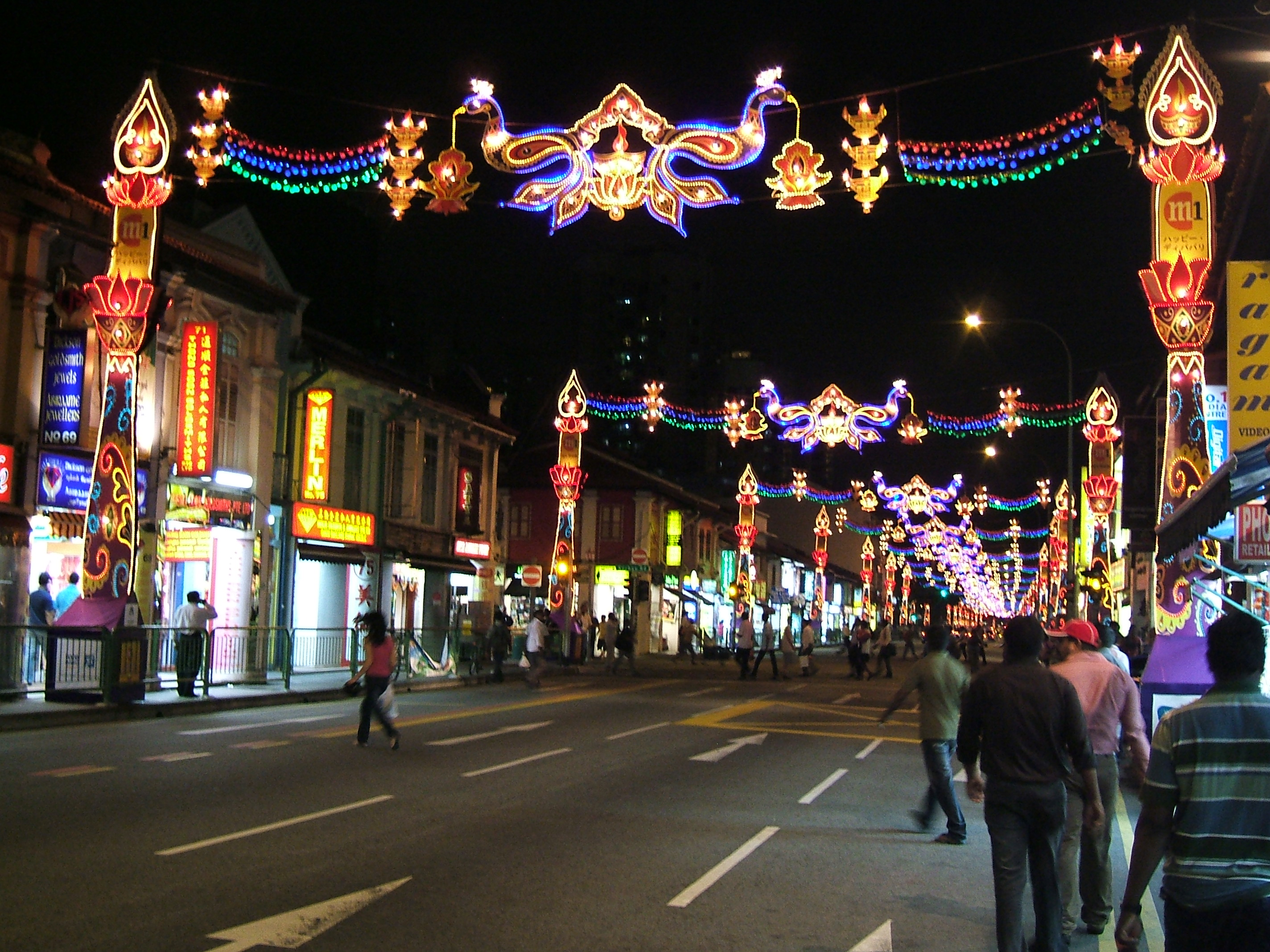
Deepavali decorations in Singapore.

The major public holidays reflect the mentioned racial diversity, including Chinese New Year, Buddhist Vesak Day, Muslim Eid ul-Fitr (known locally by its Malay name Hari Raya Puasa), Hindu Diwali (known locally by its Tamil name Deepavali) and Christmas, Good Friday (By Christians), and New Year's Day are also public holidays.

On 9 August, Singapore celebrates the anniversary of its independence with a series of events, including the National Day Parade which is the main ceremony. The first National Day Parade, which was held in 1966, was held at the Padang in the city centre.

In 2003, the Esplanade – "Theatres on the Bay", a centre for performing arts, was opened. The Esplanade is also known as "The Durian", due to its resemblance to the fruit. The Arts House at Old Parliament Lane has also been supportive of local performing arts in recent years. Nanyang Academy of Fine Arts (NAFA) and LASALLE College of the Arts are the two main arts institutions offering full-time programmes for the performing arts in Singapore.

== Languages ==
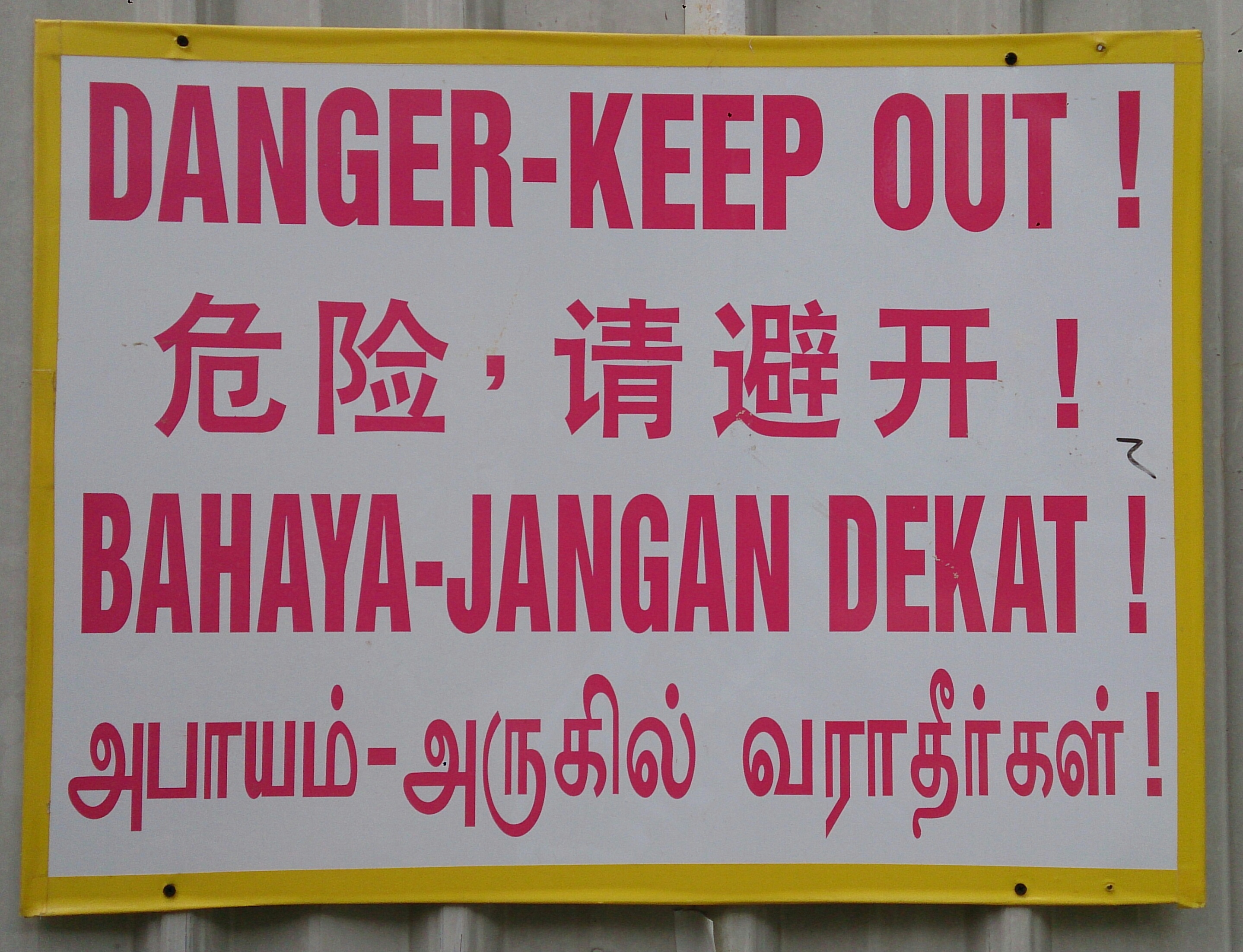
Sign board with warnings in Singapore's four main languages: English, Chinese, Malay and Tamil

Many Singaporeans are bilingual. Most speak Singaporean English and another language, most commonly Mandarin, Malay, Tamil or Singapore Colloquial English (Singlish). Singapore Standard English is virtually the same as British, Malaysian, and Indian Standard English in most aspects of grammar and spelling, though there are some differences in vocabulary as well as minor ones in spelling; for example, the word 'swap' is commonly spelled 'swop', as is standard in The Straits Times.

All Singaporeans study English as their first language in schools, under the compulsory local education system, and their mother-tongue language as their second language. Thus, most Singaporeans are effectively bilingual, especially the youths in today's society. There are four main languages in usage in Singapore. The 'national' language of Singapore is Bahasa Melayu. This is in recognition of the Malay people as the indigenous community in Singapore. 85% of Singaporeans do not speak Malay. Malay is used in the national anthem, national motto and military parade drill commands. Tamil is an official language as a majority of South Asians in Singapore are ethnic Tamils from India and Sri Lanka. While most Chinese Singaporeans are descendants of Lingnan Chinese migrants who spoke a variety of regional languages, it is the northern Chinese language of Mandarin that is official in Singapore, though varieties such as Hokkien and Cantonese are still prevalent in the older generation of Chinese.

== Popular culture ==
=== Music ===
Singapore has a diverse music culture that ranges from rock and pop to folk and classical.

=== Creative writing ===
Singaporean literature, also called "SingLit", is influenced by the multiracial nature of the country. Its development has been hampered by the strong focus on maths and science in Singaporean schools, and a preference for foreign works, which generally sell more. Some grants are provided by the government, although they are dependent on the content of the works. Notable authors include Cyril Wong, Topaz Winters, Balli Kaur Jaswal, Jeremy Tiang, and Sonny Liew.

=== Murals ===
Murals in Singapore have been encouraged by the government in recent years as part of Singapore's efforts to recast itself as a "Renaissance City" and global arts city. These public art works require permission from the government; unauthorised public art and graffiti are subject to legal penalties under the Vandalism Act in Singapore. Many murals depict scenes common to Singapore's cultural heritage.

In 2013, Singapore launched the PubliCity program, which designated two blank walls along the Rail Corridor for urban art. The Rail Corridor, once a 24 kilometres (15 mi) railway line between Singapore and Malaysia, had closed in 2011. Artwork along the walls of the Rail Corridor is curated by RSCLS, a local art collective. In 2014, the National Arts Council set up the Public Art Trust which provided both a public spaces program in which artists' proposals and willing site owners are matched up, as well as six walls at Goodman Arts Centre, Aliwal Arts Centre, and *Scape youth centre for practice spaces.

== Parks ==
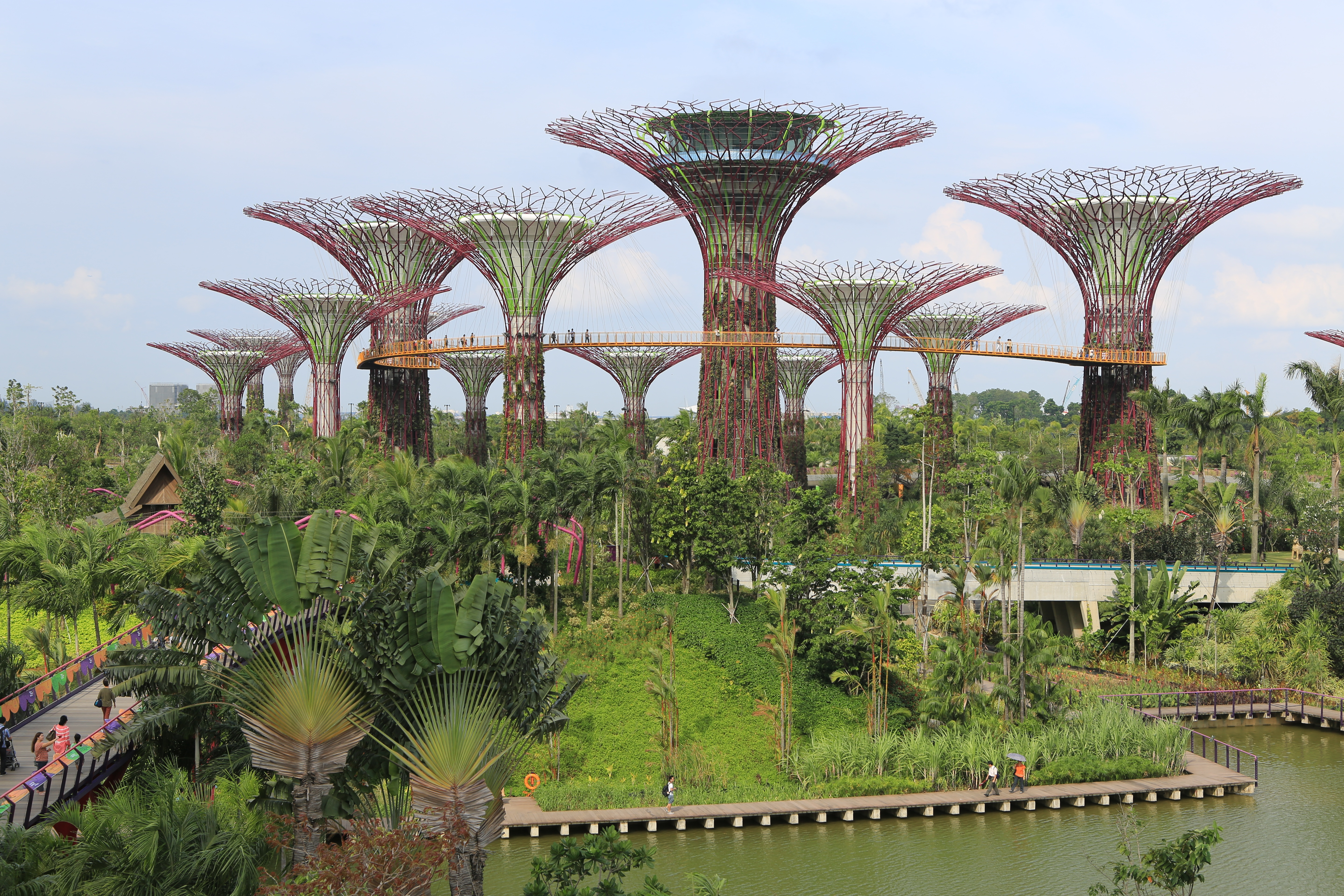
The Supertree Grove at Gardens by the Bay

Gardens and gardening have a special place in Singaporean culture as well as in politics. Historically this is all officially attributed to Lee Kuan Yew who apparently spearheaded this philosophy in 1963. In a rare interview with Monty Don shown in the TV series Around the World in 80 Gardens, Lee Kuan Yew reveals that after visits to other big Asian cities such as Hong Kong and Bangkok he feared that Singapore would turn into another concrete jungle, and he decided that gardens and parks should be established everywhere and made this a priority of the government.

== Performing arts ==
Singapore is also known as a cultural centre for arts and culture, including theatre and music.

=== Stand-up comedy ===
Singapore has a growing comedy scene with three active rooms. The three comedy rooms in Singapore are weekly, starting with Comedy Masala on Tuesdays, Talk Cock Comedy on Wednesdays and Comedy Hub Singapore on Mondays and Thursdays. Every month, The Comedy Club Asia features leading international comics such as Shazia Mirza and Imran Yusuf. Comedy Masala also brings in international comedians, such as Paul Ogata. Kumar, a drag queen who has performed in Singapore for more than 17 years, is one of Singapore's leading stand-up comedians.

== Religion ==
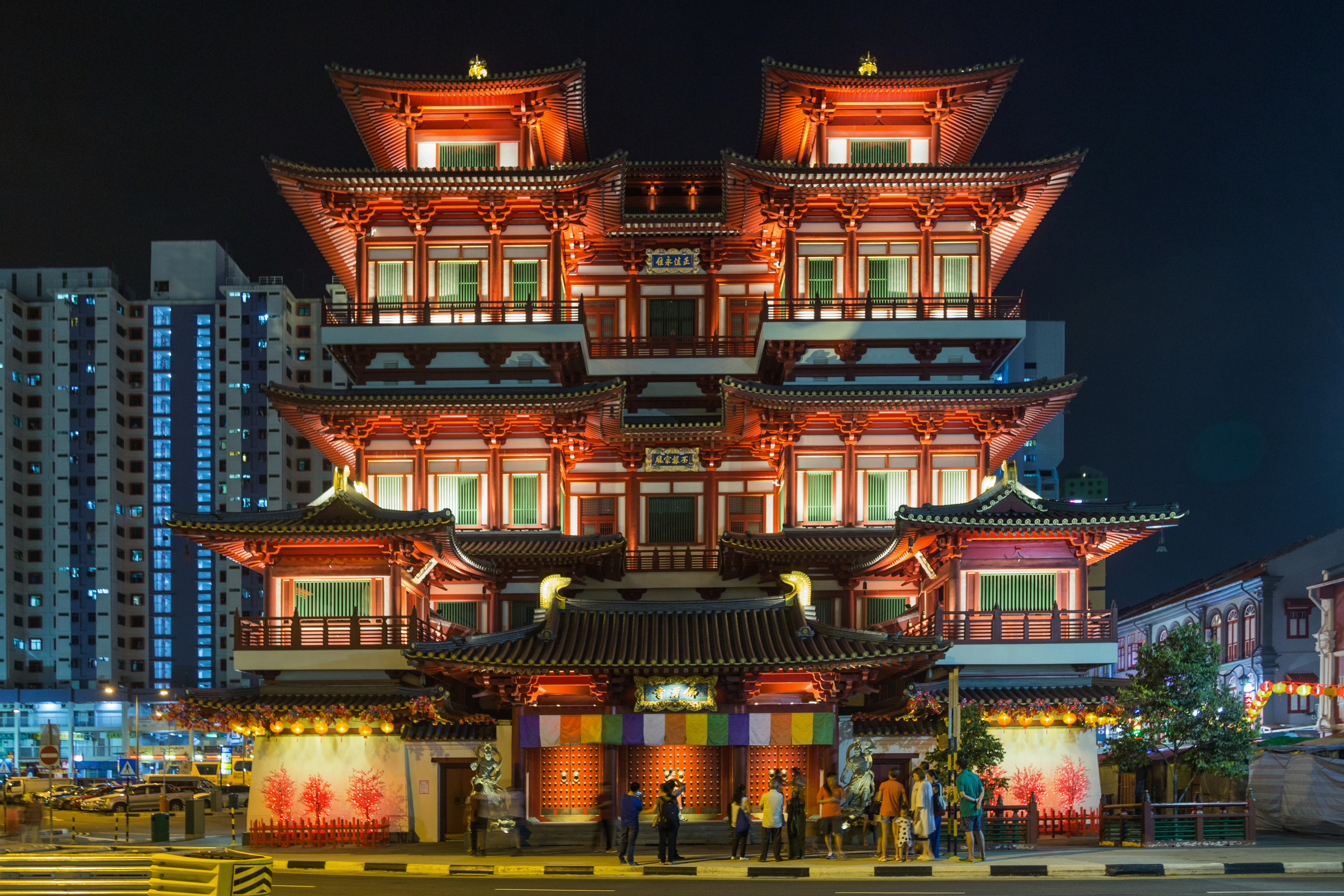
Buddha Tooth Relic Temple and Museum

Religion in Singapore is characterised by a diversity of religious beliefs and practices due to its diverse ethnic mix of peoples originating from various countries.

== UNESCO Cultural World Heritage Sites ==
The Singapore Botanic Gardens is one of three gardens, and the only tropical garden, to be honoured as a UNESCO World Heritage Site.

== UNESCO Representative List of the Intangible Cultural Heritage of Humanity ==
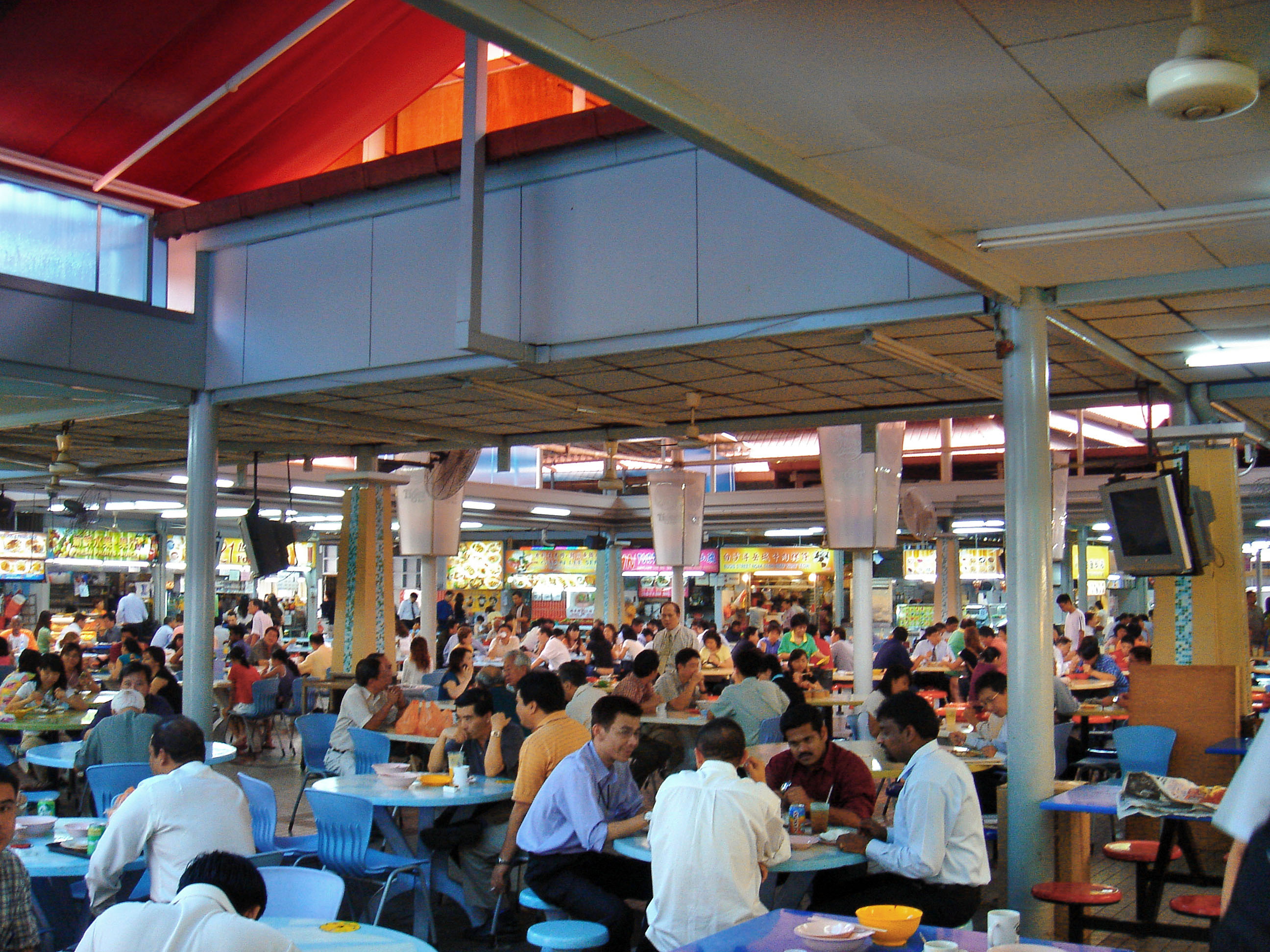
A hawker centre in Lavender, Singapore

Hawker culture in Singapore was added to the UNESCO list in December 2020, unanimously accepted by a 24-member international committee on 16 December 2020.

National Geographic described Singapore's hawker culture as an endangered food tradition due to a halt in construction of hawker centres since Singapore's rapid development in the seventies and eighties, and an increase in difficulty to get young people into the hawker profession.

== See also ==
- Architecture of Singapore
- National Courtesy Campaign (Singapore)
- Total Defence (Singapore)
