= Live at Gotham =

- Genre: Stand-up comedy
- Original language: English

Original release
- Network: Comedy Central
- Release: July 21, 2006 – December 11, 2009

Live at Gotham is an American stand-up comedy television show airing on Comedy Central. The show features up and coming stand-up comedians performing live at the Gotham Comedy Club in New York City. It premiered on July 21, 2006.

== Episodes ==
=== Season 1 (2006) ===
Episode	Original air date	Host	Comedians (in order of appearance)
104	July 21, 2006	Christopher Titus	Joe DeVito, KT Tatara, Marianne Sierk, Eddie Pence, David Crowe, Tom Simmons
102	July 28, 2006	Greg Behrendt	Jeff Mac, Mike Yard, Jesse Joyce, Kristen Schaal, Chad Daniels, Dave Nystrom
103	August 4, 2006	Patton Oswalt	Andy Borowitz, Dave Mordal, John Mulaney, Susan Prekel, Dan Cummins, Ian Edwards
105	August 11, 2006	Bill Burr	Matt Fulchiron, Darryl Lenox, Tommy Johnagin, Kjell Bjorgen, Karen Rontowski, Kirk Fox
106	August 25, 2006	Joe Rogan	Drake Witham, Jordan Carlos, Mike Black, Andrew Norelli, Dan Sally, Chris Porter
101	September 1, 2006	Sommore	Flip Schultz, Jay Larson, Veronica Mosey, Jeff Caldwell, John Wessling, Auggie Smith

=== Season 2 (2007) ===
Episode	Original air date	Host	Comedians (in order of appearance)
201	May 18, 2007	Artie Lange	Al Jackson, Jeremy Schacter, Amanda Melson, Geoff Keith, Kurt Metzger, Joey Gay
207	May 25, 2007	Lewis Black	Jacob Sirof, Dan Rothenberg, Steve Wilson, Andi Smith, Ryan Stout, John Bowman
205	June 1, 2007	Jim Breuer	Gerry Dee, John Ramsey, Pete Dominick, Freddy Lockhart, Lisa DeLarios, Bryan Callen
208	June 8, 2007	Gabriel Iglesias	Lachlan Patterson, Dave Landau, Rory Scovel, Sherry Sirof, Sheng Wang, Joe Klocek
206	June 22, 2007	Jeffrey Ross	Michael Kosta, Julie Goldman, Dan Boulger, Eric Andre, John Hoogasian, Brian Scolaro
203	June 29, 2007	Andy Kindler	Ryan Hamilton, Jonah Ray, Amy Schumer, Bryan Gutmann, Tom Sharpe, Vargus Mason
204	July 6, 2007	Robert Schimmel	Julian McCullough, Gerard Guillory, Doug Mellard, Cristela Alonzo, Ryan Belleville, Tom Segura
202	July 13, 2007	Dana Gould	John Evans, Gina Brillon, Louis Katz, Paul Varghese, Malik S., Jamie Kaler

=== Season 3 (2008) ===
Episode	Original air date	Host	Comedians (in order of appearance)
301	June 6, 2008	Jeff Dunham	Erik Griffin, JR Brow, Jared Logan, Anjelah Johnson, Michael Palascak, Lenny Marcus
303	June 13, 2008	Ralphie May	Kevin Camia, James Smith, Roger Hailes, Brad Williams, Brent Weinbach, Baron Vaughn
307	June 20, 2008	D. L. Hughley	Paul Ogata, Myq Kaplan, Josh Homer, Liz Miele, Shane Mauss, Theo Von
302	June 27, 2008	Jim Norton	Rob O'Reilly, Nate Bargatze, Erin Jackson, Mike Vecchione, Mo Mandel, Ryan Dalton
305	July 11, 2008	Kevin Hart	Joe List, Vince Averill, Na'im Lynn, Matt McCarthy, Lucas Molandes, T.J. Miller
306	July 18, 2008	Rich Vos	Ryan Sickler, Bob Biggerstaff, Hugh Moore, Chelsea Peretti, Hari Kondabolu, Mike DeStefano
308	July 25, 2008	Daniel Tosh	Matt Braunger, Hannibal Buress, Owen Benjamin, Mary Mack, Nigel Lawrence, Adam Devine
304	August 1, 2008	Tommy Davidson	Bengt Washburn, Noe Gonzalez, Geoff Tate, Erin Judge, Raj Desai, Jon Dore

=== Season 4 (2009) ===
Episode	Original air date	Host	Comedians (in order of appearance)
405	October 16, 2009	Jo Koy	Debra DiGiovanni, Cory Fernandez, Andy Ritchie, Taylor Williamson, Reese Waters, Wil Sylvince
402	October 23, 2009	Bobby Lee	Iliza Shlesinger, Dustin Ybarra, Patrick Keane, Don Friesen, Nick Cobb, Chris D'Elia
408	October 30, 2009	Judah Friedlander	Andy Woodhull, Gina Yashere, Alex Koll, Chuck Watkins, Randy Kagan, Ron G
407	November 6, 2009	Paul F. Tompkins	Nick Kroll, Eric Krug, Kent Haines, Thai Rivera, Daniel Kilpatrick, Kumail Nanjiani
404	November 13, 2009	Charlie Murphy	Quinn Dahle, Edwin San Juan, Dave Waite, Gabriel Rutledge, Sean Patton, Tiffany Haddish
406	November 20, 2009	Doug Benson	Moshe Kasher, Jarrod Harris, Brent Sullivan, TuRae, Harris Wittels, Donald Glover
403	December 4, 2009	Rob Riggle	Jeff Dye, Jon Huck, Vanessa Graddick, Sean Sullivan, Kyle Kinane, Mike E. Winfield
401	December 11, 2009	Jim Jefferies	Dan Soder, Glenn Wool, Jay Phillips, Tim Harmston, Joe Mande, Jason Good
