= Tony Camin =

American actor

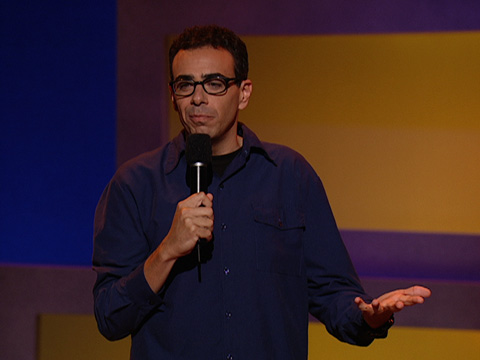
- Tony Camin on Premium Blend.
- Born: April 7, 1963 (age 63); Mountain View, California, U.S.
- Spouse: Carol Kolb

Comedy career
- Years active: 1991–present
- Medium: Stand-up
- Subjects: American culture, everyday life

Tony Camin is an American standup comedian and television writer living in New York City.

== Career ==
Camin currently performs at comedy clubs throughout the United States. He has appeared at the U.S. Comedy Arts Festival, the Just for Laughs Festival, Bumbershoot as well as on Late Night with Conan O'Brien.

Camin is co-creator of The Marijuana-Logues, an Off-Broadway comedy show he wrote and performed along with Arj Barker and Doug Benson with a year-long run at The Actors Playhouse in New York City.

Camin co-hosted a live late-night talk show called "Broin' Out" at the Upright Citizens Brigade Theatre in New York in 2006–2007.

Camin wrote for the television show Web Junk 20 and was part of the famously embattled staff of The Mike O'Malley Show.

== Early career ==
Camin made his first foray into performing as an on-air personality at the Bay Area college radio station KFJC. In the '90s, he began performing comedy at the small but influential San Francisco venue, the Holy City Zoo. While in San Francisco he lived for a time in the iconic San Francisco Comedy Condo. Camin eventually moved to Los Angeles to pursue television writing along with standup.

== Discography ==
- The Marijuana-Logues (2004)
- A Ass Pocket of Whimsy (Stand Up! Records, 2025)

== Bibliography ==
- The Marijuana-logues: Everything About Pot That We Could Remember (2005)
