= Holy City Zoo =

Comedy club in San Francisco, California

Coordinates: 37.78321°N 122.46384°W

The Holy City Zoo, which called itself "the comedian's clubhouse", was a small but influential comedy club in San Francisco that operated from the mid-1970s to the mid-1990s.

== Description ==
The Holy City Zoo was located at 408 Clement Street between 5th and 6th Avenues in San Francisco's Richmond District. It was a tiny dark cavern that had a maximum occupancy of 78. The bar sold beer, wine and soft drinks. There was a small stage set against the back wall. A few stairs stage left led to a small balcony known as "The John Wilkes Booth."

== History ==
The club got its name from a sign the first owner, Robert Steger, picked up for free at a going-out-of-business sale at the local zoo in Holy City, California. He had stopped there to buy redwood tables and chairs for the club.

During that era, the Holy City Zoo primarily functioned as a folk music club. The initiation of comedy at the venue occurred when Jim Giovanni, an impressionist, took the stage on an open mic night around 1971. Prior to Giovanni's appearance, the Holy City Zoo had no established comedy scene. He remained a fixture at the location, performing comedy nightly for nearly three years. Subsequently, other comedians searching for a stage discovered the Zoo and gradually displaced the folk music performances.

In 1975, Peter Reines purchased the business from Steger. Initially, the Zoo continued to host folk music five nights a week and remained closed on Sundays. San Francisco comedian Tony DePaul approached Reines with the idea of introducing stand-up comedy as an additional form of entertainment. Many comedians were already putting on shows in the basement of a church and were seeking a more nightclub-like setting. Sundays were designated as "open mic" nights, quickly gaining popularity. Over time, comedy expanded to all seven nights of the week. With comedian Tony DePaul's strong promotion and emceeing skills, the Zoo achieved recognition at the national and international levels. John Cantu became the club's first official comedy producer and club manager, occasionally spending the night on the stage after closing.

Open-mike nights continually ran one or two nights a week throughout the club's existence. Anyone could sign up for a five-minute set, including some comedians who went on to be stars.

It continued as a full-time comedy club for nearly 20 years. The Zoo was a "clubhouse" of sorts for comedians; it was the destination for many after a gig to hang out, gossip, drink, complain about the business, and perhaps catch a glimpse of some big-time headliner working on new material (most notably, Robin Williams, "who used the club as his neighborhood rehearsal space"). Television producer George Schlatter first saw Williams when he performed at Holy City, and remarked of him "...because people could not believe what they were seeing. It was character after character and that unbelievable machine-gun delivery". Rob Schneider could often be spotted hovering outside the club waiting to go onstage because he was underage. Due to a changing neighborhood and the lack of a full liquor license, the club was never financially solvent, and changed ownership many times. Among the various people who owned or co-owned the Zoo were Steger, Reines, Cantu, Jason Cristoble, Tom Sawyer, talent manager Bob Fisher, comedian Jim Samuels, and, at the end, Gilda and George Forrester (parents of the Zoo's last manager, Tracy Forrester) and Will and Debi Durst (who retained the rights to the "Holy City Zoo" trademark).

The Zoo went out of business at least once in the 1980s, reopening briefly as the Ha-Ha-A-Go-Go (under Tom Sawyer). In 1988, several comedians from the club had been recorded for the making of a George Schlatter-produced two-hour TV special The Comedy Club Special, hosted by Dudley Moore. The Holy City Zoo finally closed for good in 1994 and became a karaoke bar. In the later years, Holy City Zoo had been co-owned by Bob Fisher and Jim Samuels, the latter being the 1982 winner of the San Francisco International Comedy Competition. The final closing of the Zoo was a 24-hour "farewell marathon" hosted by Jeremy S. Kramer and ran from midnight August 29 to midnight August 30. Robin Williams said of the club's demise "like someone pulling the life support on your aunt. It's depressing. The Zoo was the womb".

On January 18, 1996, the club was temporarily revived as the non-profit "The New Zoo" for weekly open-mic nights on Thursdays at its original location (now called Seaport Tavern). Co-owner Jim Samuels died in 1990 at age 41 so only co-owner Bob Fisher was present and promoting the new revival.

On April 20, 2011, Bay Area comedy troupe Sylvan Productions began hosting a weekly Wednesday night stand up open mic, and regular Saturday feature showcases at Dirty Trix Saloon, bringing comedy back to the historical location.

== List of past performers ==
The following is a partial list of comedians and other performers who either got their start or had performances at the Holy City Zoo:

- The Amazing Johnathan
- Kevin Nealon
- Bill Rafferty
- Bobby Slayton
- Carrie Snow
- Aisha Tyler
- Tony Camin
- Dana Carvey
- Robin Williams
