= 800 Pound Gorilla Media =

American comedy media company

- Founded: 2016
- Founder: Ryan Bitzer, Damion Greiman, Ian Adkins, Anthony Leo
- Genre: Comedy
- Country of origin: U.S.
- Location: Nashville, Tennessee
- Official website: www.800poundgorillamedia.com

800 Pound Gorilla Media is an American independent mass media company that produces, markets and distributes stand-up comedy video specials and albums. It was founded in 2016 in Nashville, Tennessee by Ryan Bitzer, Damion Greiman, Ian Adkins and Anthony Leo. The company has worked with over 400 comics including Bill Burr, Matt Rife, Whitney Cummings, Jim Jefferies, Nikki Glaser, Seth Meyers, Leanne Morgan, Pete Holmes, Patton Oswalt and more. In May of 2026, the company launched Gorilla Comedy+, a streaming service dedicated to stand-up comedy.

== History ==
800 Pound Gorilla was founded in 2016 by former comedy managers Ryan Bitzer and Damion Greiman along with founding members Ian Adkins and Anthony Leo, who saw an opportunity to bring modern strategies in consumer targeting, digital marketing and fan engagement to the stand-up comedy space. Their work began with producing and distributing comedy albums, with their first release being Jim Jeffree’s Freedumb in the fall of 2016. Besides releasing brand new comedy albums through their flagship label, 800 Pound Gorilla Media showcases vintage comedy acts through the legacy comedy label Clown Jewels and provides distribution services and marketing for Nate Bargatze’s Nateland Entertainment, Comedy Central, Just For Laughs, Kevin Hart's LOL Network and Bill Burr's All Things Comedy, among other partnerships.

In 2018, the company began producing and distributing full length stand-up comedy video specials.Their first original video special was Chad Daniels’s Dad Chaniels, which was released on their website and YouTube channel as well as to additional SVOD and TVOD distributors such as Amazon. Since then, 800 Pound Gorilla has produced and distributed specials from comedians such as Pete Holmes, Kevin Nealon, David Cross, J.B. Ball, Gina Brillon, Kelsey Cook and many more.

In February 2019, the founders of 800 Pound Gorilla partnered with former Broadcast Music executive Jim King to found Spoken Giants, a multi-rights organization that helps creators of spoken word copyrights collect royalties on the performance of their works. The company represents hundreds of members, including Patton Oswalt, Jeff Foxworthy, Lewis Black, Dan Cummins, Gerry Dee, Pete Holmes, Kyle Kinane, Kathleen Madigan, the Ralphie May Estate, Leanne Morgan, Theo Von, and hundreds of others.

In May of 2026, 800 Pound Gorilla launched Gorilla Comedy+, an ad-free streaming service dedicated to stand-up comedy. Gorilla Comedy+ features exclusive new specials alongside the full 800 Pound Gorilla catalog of more than 250 titles, including Patton Oswalt’s Tea and Scotch, James Austin Johnson’s He’ll Yeah, and exclusive releases from Sal Vulcano, Emmy Blotnick, Pete Holmes, Jourdain Fisher, Nish Kumar, Ian Bagg, Chris Hardwick, Whitney Cummings, David Cross, Matt Rife, Kyle Kinane, and Anjelah Johnson-Reyes. The platform combines a curated library, exclusive programming, comedian spotlights, and a direct relationship with subscribers, creating an additional revenue and distribution channel.

== Notable video specials ==
Comedy specials:

- Matt Rife - Only Fans
- Mark Normand - Out To Lunch
- Patton Oswalt - Tea & Scotch
- Kelsey Cook - The Hustler, Mark Your Territory
- Sal Vulcano - Terrified
- Pete Holmes - Silly Silly Fun Boy
- Anjelah Johnson- Reyes - Say I Won’t, Technically Not Stalking
- Gina Brillon - Mind Your Business
- Nick Swardson - Make Joke From Face
- ISMO - Hello
- Adam Ray - Read The Room
- Josh Blue - Freak Accident
- Greg Warren - The Salesman
- Trae Crowder - Trash Daddy
- Kevin Nealon - Loose In The Crotch
- J. Snow - Life Is Funny
- David Cross - Worst Daddy In The World
- Sasheer Zamata - The First Woman
- Jimmy Carr - Laughing and Joking
- James Austin Johnson - He'll Yeah

== Notable comedy albums ==
Comedy specials:

- Jim Jefferies – Freedumb
- Chad Daniels – Dad Chaniels, Twelfth Night
- Demetri Martin – Live at the Time
- Iliza Shlesinger – Confirmed Kills
- Jo Koy – Live from Seattle
- Michelle Wolf – Nice Lady
- Kyle Kinane – Trampoline in a Ditch, Shocks And Struts
- Eddie Pepitone – For the Masses
- Fern Brady – Power & Chaos
- Kurt Braunohler – Perfectly Stupid
- Rory Scovel – Live Without Fear
- Greg Warren – Where the Field Corn Grows
- Leanne Morgan - I’m Every Woman
- Bill Burr - Drop Dead Years
- Seth Meyers - Dad Man Walking
- Nikki Glaser - Good Girl
- Sebastian Maniscalco - It Ain’t Right
- Marc Maron - Panicked
- Theo Von - 30lb Bag Of Hampster Bones, Too Real

== Scripted comedy ==
- Greg in LA
- Hidden America
- Burb Patrol

== See also ==
- List of record labels
- Comedy Central Records
