= Fameless =

American prank show

- Genre: Prank show
- Presented by: David Spade
- Composers: Alec Puro; Gramoscope Music
- Country of origin: United States
- Original language: English
- No. of seasons: 2
- No. of episodes: 42

Production
- Executive producers: Kevin Healey; David Spade; Tara Long; Ben Silverman; Gwenn Morreale; Drew Buckley
- Producer: Julie Ann Harris
- Editors: Daric Loo; M.G. Miller; Ryan Wise; Erik Lutsch
- Running time: 21–25 min.
- Production companies: Entertainment One Television; Electus

Original release
- Network: TruTV
- Release: July 29, 2015 – February 16, 2017

Fameless is an American prank show hosted by David Spade that aired on TruTV for two seasons from 2015 to 2017. The original order was for eight episodes, with an additional ten added to fill out the first season, having received better-than-network-average ratings during its 2015 summer run.

The series features a group of desperate unsuspecting fame-seeking individuals who believe they've been cast on a reality show. However, they are really filming a parody with improv actors creating over-the-top scenarios that steadily increase the absurdity and ridiculousness of each situation

== Episodes ==
Season	Episodes	Originally released	
Season	Episodes	First released	Last released
1	18	July 29, 2015	February 22, 2016
2	24	August 1, 2016	February 16, 2017

=== Season 1 (2015-16) ===
No. overall	No. in season	Title	Original release date
1	1	"Naked and Annoyed"	July 29, 2015
A wannabe cop is sucked into a high-speed chase; a karate master and a guitarist duke it out at an audition; competitive target learns the truth.
2	2	"Say Goodbye To Hollywood"	August 5, 2015
A hopeful producer's pitch is decimated by an all-star panel; a rookie host gives news to the wrong family; a prankster is outplayed.
3	3	"To Catfish a Predator"	August 12, 2015
A self-proclaimed playboy panics after a kiss goes viral; a cocky food buff can't stomach the main course; when a wannabe reality star tries to expose a catfish, he's the one caught on the hook.
4	4	"Revenge Ink"	August 20, 2015
A nature lover falls prey to a ferocious prank; a cocky host crumbles live on the air; an aspiring rapper gets the shaft when Kat Von D inks him with a humiliating tattoo.
5	5	"Speed Trap"	August 27, 2015
A wannabe cop becomes the suspect during a traffic stop; a rookie host gets more than he bargained for at a car auction; a prankster's antics push a pregnant woman to her breaking point.
6	6	"Funky Monk"	September 10, 2015
A cop for a day goes from fighting crime to fighting off kidnappers; a wannabe reality star is speechless after confronting a cheater in action; David Spade, Michael Bolton and Gina Gershon return to corrupt another Hollywood pitch.
7	7	"Match Maid in Heaven"	September 17, 2015
A judgmental know-it-all gets a dose of her own medicine; a gold digger competes for love but winds up an old maid; a pretty boy is left speechless when a breakup suddenly turns into a break-in.
8	8	"Wheel of Misfortune"	September 24, 2015
A game show spins out of control, and a haggler becomes the pawn during an auction; the party's over for a self-proclaimed womanizer after he picks up the wrong girl.
9	9	"The Jumper"	January 18, 2016
A know-it-all unknowingly turns a battle of wits into a gorilla war; a wannabe star finds himself trapped inside a mental institution; a "cop for a day" sends a troubled stranger over the edge.
10	10	"Unfinished Business"	January 18, 2016
An exorcism turns to puppy love during a surprising climax; something blue happens when wedding bells ring for the wrong girl; a self-proclaimed genius looking to bait crooks winds up taking the bait himself.
11	11	"Road Rage"	January 25, 2016
A feisty waitress is driven to madness when her car gets an unexpected makeover; an aspiring hypnotist loses all control; a wannabe stylist comes apart at the seams after hitting celebrity Jill Zarin below the belt.
12	12	"Issues Don't Need Tissues"	January 25, 2016
A trivia game leads to shocking results; a fiery contestant's chance at stardom bursts into flames; a wannabe roadie kisses the rock star lifestyle goodbye after failing the legendary Gene Simmons. This is the first episode which includes comedian Ryan Stout.
13	13	"The Hammer"	February 1, 2016
The walls come down for a cocky fame-seeker when he bulldozes his way into a toxic situation; a pretty boy gets dirty while promoting a foul face mask; a jealous girlfriend is on the hook for a memorable tattoo she'd rather forget. Guest star: Bill Engvall
14	14	"Half Baked"	February 1, 2016
A woman loses her patience when a patient goes missing; a saleswoman markets a faulty tanning product; a jokester's attempt to prank Jay Leno backfires.
15	15	"Close Encounters"	February 8, 2016
A stakeout for illegal aliens turns otherworldly; a jokester's prank has an unintended reaction; a style queen patrols for crimes of fashion.
16	16	"Mayan Ruined"	February 15, 2016
A jealous girlfriend comes out swinging when a dating show does not go her way; a prankster's shot at fame is cursed after he accidentally ruins a museum; the Pitch Fit panel returns.
17	17	"Dead Wrong"	February 22, 2016
A wannabe reality star hosts a funeral; a cocky competitor loses control; a man accidentally steers himself into a bank robbery.
18	18	"Faceless"	February 22, 2016
A wannabe reality star's 15 minutes of fame turns into a life sentence; a know-it-all doctor goes rogue; a host tries selling a flawed cosmetic.

=== Season 2 (2016–17) ===
No. overall	No. in season	Title	Original release date
19	1	"The Invasion"	August 1, 2016
The first day on the job might be the last day on earth; a wannabe reality star finds himself fully exposed in a heated love triangle; a TV host inadvertently uses his newfound powers for evil.
20	2	"The ShawPrank Redemption"	August 1, 2016
A prison prank becomes a prison break; an angry robot gets its buttons pushed; a self-proclaimed expert on dog discipline discovers a terrifying new breed.
21	3	"Zings and Zonks"	August 8, 2016
An aspiring TV host has a drone turn against him; a would-be prankster becomes a tyrannosaurus wrecks; an insult comic gets taken for a ride.
22	4	"Raiders of the Lost Art"	August 15, 2016
An aspiring TV host learns the real art of pranking; an attempt to take the antiques game by storm comes to an electrifying halt. This is the second episode which includes comedian Ryan Stout.
23	5	"High Speed Chase"	August 22, 2016
An aspiring cop's chance to be a crime fighter crumbles; an emcee's hopes of surprising a famous pair of wrestling twins go up in flames; a would-be prankster's attempt at tricking a zookeeper turns grizzly.
24	6	"The Home Wrecker"	August 29, 2016
A wannabe TV host accidentally unleashes hell; an aspiring real estate guru encounters a housing crisis; a "con artist" thinks he's pulling a scam. This is the third episode which includes comedian Ryan Stout.
25	7	"Wet Gold"	September 5, 2016
A wannabe treasure hunter unearths a monstrous discovery; an aspiring hypnotist learns that certain behavior doesn't fly at corporate events.
26	8	"Rage of Enlightenment"	September 12, 2016
A wannabe TV host learns that the energy drink he's selling has some monstrous side effects, a tomb raider discovers why a mummy is best kept under wraps; a skateboarding legend pulls off a perfect 180 on an aspiring prankster.
27	9	"The Vanishing"	September 19, 2016
A know-it-all unknowingly turns a battle of wits into a gorilla war; a wannabe star finds himself trapped inside a mental institution; a "cop for a day" sends a troubled stranger over the edge.
28	10	"Flash of Brilliance"	September 26, 2016
A wannabe dancer discovers that stardom can be gone in a flash; a cooking show contestant accidentally uses a stomach-turning secret ingredient; a small-time medium gets an extra-large surprise that no psychic could have predicted.
29	11	"Home is Where the Haunt Is"	October 3, 2016
A wannabe host appraises a home with phantom costs; an aspiring meteorologist strikes lightning with one stormy audition; a would-be home renovator learns the difference between a man cave and a panic room.
30	12	"The Joy of Hex"	October 10, 2016
An aspiring game show host discovers his new show is not the smash hit he thought it would be, and a dog groomer has a ruff first day trying to fix a faux-paw.
31	13	"I Robot?"	November 28, 2016
Traffic cop discovers that his job involves more labor than expected; a diva host gets a reality check; a trickster's robotic prank short-circuits.
32	14	"One Bad Egg"	November 28, 2016
A wannabe nature expert gets egged on by his partner; an aspiring magician's assistant finds his gift for hypnosis; a sassy host cooks up some jealousy.
33	15	"Locked in Time"	December 5, 2016
An amateur archaeologist gets a time-out; a wannabe salesman drives away customers; an aspiring food star chokes when a critic can't stomach his meal. This is the fourth episode which includes comedian Ryan Stout.
34	16	"Through the Cooking Glass"	December 12, 2016
An aspiring art expert gets "framed"; a product tester learns a lesson in the kitchen; a wannabe relationship expert loses a woman in the woods. This is the fifth episode which includes comedian Ryan Stout.
35	17	"Fameless Holiday Special!"	December 19, 2016
A wannabee game show host and his contestant have an unfortunate run-in with Santa Claus; a helpful Elf tries to find out if a hospital should be on the naughty or nice list; an aspiring host crashes a holiday event. This is the sixth episode which includes comedian Ryan Stout.
36	18	"Ear Factor"	December 26, 2016
A wannabe host pitches a product that's too good to be true; an aspiring crime fighter runs out of gas at a sting; a drill sergeant bombs a chance at stardom.
37	19	"Host Busters"	January 2, 2017
A wannabe TV star finds a crack in a new dental product; an aspiring host takes a swing at stardom; a would-be hotel critic doesn't have a ghost of a chance. This is the seventh episode which includes comedian Ryan Stout.
38	20	"No Brain No Gain"	January 9, 2017
An aspiring model fails her makeup exam; an antique picker offends an ancient spirit.
39	21	"Gorilla Warfare"	January 16, 2017
An amateur archeologist gets cursed out on live television; a gamer's opponent goes bananas; a wannabe joker learns why not to prank David Spade.
40	22	"The Trashed and the Furious"	January 23, 2017
A prankster's dirty trick turns out to be garbage; tensions rise as guests freeze on a TV show; a clueless investigator goes into the wrong sting.
41	23	"Spa-mageddon"	January 30, 2017
A product tester thinks he'll be working with professionals but instead runs into boobs; a relaxing trip to the spa turns out to be a real pain in the butt.
42	24	"Tornado Alley"	February 6, 2017
A lively host gets charged up for her debut, but finds herself in a shocking predicament; an aspiring crime fighter becomes a not-so-smooth criminal.
