= Tom Simmons (comedian) =

American comedian

- Born: Hicksville, Nassau, New York, US
- Notable work: San Francisco International Comedy Competition
- Spouse: Serena Simmons
- Children: 1

Comedy career
- Medium: Stand-up comedy
- Website: www.tomsimmonscomedy.com

Tom Simmons (born February 27) is an American stand-up comedian. He was the winner of the San Francisco Comedy Competition in 2009.

== Career ==
In 2009, Simmons won the San Francisco International Comedy Competition.

He has appeared in BET's ComicView, Showtime's White Boyz in the Hood, and Comedy Central's Live at Gotham. He publishes several podcasts: "Bully the Bullies!" and "The End Is Not Near". He is also a guest on other podcasts like "Filter Free Amerika."

Simmons has also released several comedy albums. His CDs include (ONE), Next (ONE),Live at McCurdy's, and Stages. His most recent release on Rooftop Comedy Productions is Keep Up (2010). He has also released a comedy DVD titled Standup Underground.

== Personal life ==
Simmons and his wife Serena live in Greensboro, North Carolina. They have a son Owen born in 2004.

== Filmography and discography ==
=== Stand-up comedy releases ===
Solo albums and TV specials
Title	Release date	Debut medium
One	December 4, 2001	Audio CD
Next One	2002	Audio CD
Stand Up Underground	2006	DVD Video
Stages	December 13, 2006	Audio CD
Keep Up	June 29, 2010	Audio CD
Comedy	May 14, 2019	Audio streaming
Peace, Love and Whatnot	January 27, 2020	Streaming TV (Dry Bar Comedy)
Tightrope	September 25, 2025	Streaming TV (Laugh After Dark TV)
Love Everybody	September 25, 2025	Streaming TV (Laugh After Dark TV)

=== Television ===
- Live at Gotham
- Laughs
- PureFlix Comedy All-Stars (Episode 4)
- Single Drunk Female (4 episodes)
