= Greg Warren (comedian) =

American comedian

Greg Warren is an American stand-up comedian, writer, and former collegiate wrestler. Known for his observational, family-friendly humor rooted in his Midwestern upbringing, Warren has released several comedy specials and albums, and is a frequent guest on nationally syndicated radio and SiriusXM. His most recent special, The Champ (2025), was produced by fellow comedian Nate Bargatze.

== Early life and education ==
Greg Warren hails from St. Louis, Missouri. His father was a high school wrestling coach, and his mother made him play clarinet in the band. Warren has often drawn comedic material from the conflict of being both a varsity wrestler and a band geek.

He was a cadet at the United States Military Academy at West Point, where he distinguished himself by amassing a large number of demerits and endless hours of marching. He later transferred to the University of Missouri, where he studied journalism and became an All-American collegiate wrestler.

== Collegiate wrestling ==
Warren lettered four years in wrestling at the University of Missouri. He qualified for the NCAA Division I Championships three times and earned All-American honors with a seventh-place finish as a senior in 1991. He finished in the top four at the Big Eight Conference tournament three times. Warren received the Marshall Esteppe Most Outstanding Freshman award in 1988 and the Most Outstanding Wrestler award in 1991.

Prior to college, he won Missouri state wrestling championships as a junior and senior, after placing fifth as a sophomore. He also played football and ran cross country, while attending Kirkwood High School in St. Louis.

== Comedy career ==
During college, Warren won a comedy contest and was invited to perform at Déjà Vu, a local club in Columbia, Missouri. After graduating, he worked selling Jif peanut butter and Pringles for Procter & Gamble — a formative chapter he later turned into comedic material. He eventually made the decision to become a full-time comedian.

Warren was invited to Montreal’s Just for Laughs comedy festival in 2002 as one of the featured New Faces of Comedy. He has appeared on Comedy Central Presents, Comedy Central’s Premium Blend, NBC’s Last Comic Standing, Late Night with Seth Meyers, and The Late Late Show. He was a finalist on BET’s Coming to the Stage and has performed on Country Music Television.

He is a longtime favorite on the nationally syndicated The Bob & Tom Show, where he contributes a recurring call-in segment known as "The Warren Report". His "Flute Man" bit is one of the most requested bits in the show’s history.

Warren’s material has been a daily staple on SiriusXM for over a decade and can be heard regularly on the Pure Comedy channel (formerly Laugh USA) and Jeff & Larry’s Comedy Roundup. He has guested on podcasts including Nateland, Never Not Funny, Bertcast, Dumb People Town, and The Adam Carolla Show.

He is the co-host of The Consumers, a podcast on Nate Bargatze’s Nateland network, where he and fellow comedians Tim Convy and Sean O’Brien do a weekly deep dive into one national brand.

== Specials and albums ==
Warren’s latest comedy special, The Champ (2025), produced by Nate Bargatze, is streaming on Nateland’s YouTube channel. The special explores poison ivy, the rise of high school fishing teams, and his own questionable claims to champion status. The New York Times praised The Champ, writing: “His appealing, all-American observational humor begins with such sound, simple ideas, executed with commitment. Produced by Nate Bargatze, who shares his family-friendly, slice-of-life style, Warren takes on a big, bland subject like poison ivy or Walgreens, then sits with it, attacking from a dizzying number of angles.”

His previous special, The Salesman — co-produced by Nate Bargatze and 800 Pound Gorilla Media — was hailed by The New York Times as having “done for peanut butter what Jerry Seinfeld did for Pop-Tarts and Jim Gaffigan did for Hot Pockets.” The hour tells the story of his post-college years selling Jif and Pringles.

He can also be seen in the Amazon Prime special Where the Field Corn Grows and Fish Sandwich on Dry Bar Comedy.

Warren has released several CDs: One Star Wonder (June 2009) and Running Out of Time (September 2013), which reached No. 3 and No. 6 respectively on the iTunes Top Comedy Albums chart. His album Fish Sandwich (2017) reached No. 1 on the iTunes Comedy chart.

== Other work ==
Warren has done college wrestling color commentary for Fox Sports Midwest. He appeared in the independent films 23 Minutes to Sunrise, Marshall the Miracle Dog, and Punching Henry. He is a founding member of the St. Louis Sketch Week Players, whose sketches can be heard on SiriusXM and Pandora.

== Personal life ==
Warren continues to tour nationally. He can be seen working out new material on a domestic tour throughout 2025.
