= Comedy Masala =

Venue for stand-up comedy in Singapore

Coordinates: 1.28647°N 103.84902°E

Comedy Masala logo

Comedy Masala is a venue for stand-up comedy located at Hero's, Circular Road, Singapore. Founded in September 2010 by Umar Rana, Comedy Masala offers a weekly stand-up comedy show featuring a mix of Singaporean and international comedians that attracts close to 200 fans every week and has hosted well-known comedians from around the world, including Butch Bradley, Wali Collins, Al Ducharme and Paul Ogata. Comedy Masala is one of the only venues that offers an open mic format in Singapore.
