= Don Friesen =

American stand-up comedian

- Born: Donald Jay Friesen; Fresno, California
- Website: http://www.donfriesen.com/

Don Friesen is an American stand-up comedian. Friesen is a relatively "clean" performer who uses self-deprecating humor to lampoon his life as a suburban husband and father. His act consists of satirical scenes that spoof his daily interactions with his wife, kids, tech support, creditors, and airline pilots, mixed in with impressions, improvisation and audience interaction.

Friesen was born and raised in Fresno, California. He graduated with a business degree from the University of Southern California. In his senior year at USC, Friesen founded a campus-based improv troupe called Commedus Interruptus that still performs weekly shows on campus. In 1992, Friesen married Jill Scariano. They live in South Pasadena, California, with their two children.

In 1999, Friesen won the prestigious San Francisco International Comedy Competition. In 2005, he returned to the competition with different material and took first place again, becoming the only person to win the competition twice. His first win led to a performance on the Martin Short Show, where, immediately after his set, he was asked to change his shirt and tape a second performance in front of the same audience. The second set aired a month later. Friesen has also appeared on Byron Allen’s Comics Unleashed. His episode was tapped for the syndicated program’s compilation “Best of Comics Unleashed” DVD.

Friesen’s stand-up performance DVD/CD “Inexplicable,” was taped at the Crest Theatre in Sacramento, CA, and released independently in July 2005.

Friesen performed on Comedy Central's "Live at Gotham" (2009) episode #4.2, which originally aired in Oct 2009. He currently tours the country performing live in a variety of venues ranging from comedy clubs, theaters, and casinos, to corporate events, colleges and cruise ships. He can be heard regularly in Los Angeles on the 95.5 KLOS Five O-Clock Funnies, and nationally on XM and Sirius Satellite Radio.
