= San Francisco Comedy Competition =

Yearly stand-up comedy contest in San Francisco, California

- Status: Active
- Genre: Comedy competition
- Location: San Francisco, California
- Country: United States
- Founder: Frank Kidder
- Participants: Comedians
- Major events: Stand-up comedy
- Website: sanfranciscocomedycompetition.com

The San Francisco Comedy Competition (sometimes referred to as the San Francisco International Comedy Competition or The San Francisco International Stand-Up Comedy Competition) is a stand-up comedy contest held each September in San Francisco, California, and neighboring areas of Northern California.

== History ==
The SFICC was originally conceived by Bay Area comedian Frank Kidder. However, it has been produced since its inception by Jon and Anne Fox, who now retain complete ownership after purchasing Kidder's share.

The competition has evolved from two nights of 20 comics performing, to its current multi-week format.

== The competition ==
Hundreds of comedians each year submit applications to enter the contest. Of these, 32 are chosen to perform in one of two week-long preliminary rounds. In these prelims, comedians perform sets of 5 to 7 minutes in length and the top five from each preliminary round move on to the semi-finals.

The semi-final round is another week of shows, with the 10 semi-finalists performing sets of 10 to 12 minutes. From this group, five finalists are chosen.

Finalists must prove themselves in yet another week of shows, this time performing sets ranging in length from 12 to 15 minutes.

Penalties are assessed for comedians who go over or under the time constraints.

The performances are judged on the following criteria: Material, Stage Presence, Delivery, Technique, Audience Response, Audience Rapport, and the judges' "Gut Feeling" about the performer. Typically, the judges, who are different at each event, are previous competitors, members of the media, talent agents/scouts and representatives from the performance venue. There is also an extra point awarded given by the audience through their applause after a comedian's performance. If the audience gives a ten-count of enthusiastic applause, the extra point is awarded.

Venues are varied and wide-ranged to ensure that the performers can play to all types of audience and have included bars, clubs, casinos, colleges, theatres and more.

== Previous winners ==
Year	Winner	Runners-Up			
Year	Winner	2nd	3rd	4th	5th
1976	Bill Farley	Robin Williams	Bob Sarlatte	Mark Miller	Mitch Krug
1977	Dana Carvey	Gil Christner	A. Whitney Brown	Bill Farley	Mark McCollum
1978	Mark McCollum	Marty Cohen	Jack Marion	Mitch Krug	Darryl Henriques
1979	Marsha Warfield	Mike Davis	Dana Carvey	Michael Winslow	A. Whitney Brown
1980	Michael Pritchard	Denny Johnston	James Wesley Jackson	Bobby Slayton	Jack Marion
1981	Ronn Lucas	Bob Dubac	John Fox	Barry Sobel	Dr. Gonzo
1982	Jim Samuels	Kevin Pollak	Jack Gallagher	Will Durst	Carrie Snow
1983	Will Durst	Leland Brown	D. Alan Moss	Dr. Gonzo	Ray Hanna
1984	Doug Ferrari	Mark Pitta	Paul Kelly	Joe Alaskey	D. Alan Moss
1985	Sinbad	Ellen DeGeneres	Evan Davis	Steve Kravitz	Steven Pearl
1986	Jake Johannsen	Eddy Strange	Rich Ceisler	Milt Abel	Dana Gould
1987	Warren Thomas	Rick Reynolds	Rob Becker	Tom Kenny	Rob Schneider
1988	Mike Dugan	Brian Haley	Billy Elmer	Jeffrey Jena	Tree
1989	Dexter Madison	Mark Curry	Dan St. Paul	Henry Cho	Denny Johnston
1990	Christopher Collins	Nick DiPaolo	Matt Weinhold	Karin Babbitt	Warren Spottswood
1991	Don McMillan	Tim Wiggins	Barry Weintraub	Rodney Johnson	Louis C.K.
1992	Johnny Steele	Ngaio Bealum	Maria Falzone	Barry Weintraub	T. Marni Vos
1993	Carlos Alazraqui	Marc Maron	Stephen B.	Rick Kerns	Patton Oswalt
1994	Jackie Flynn	Rick Kerns	Wild Willie Parsons	Roger Rittenhouse	Karlton Johnson
1995	Doug Stanhope	Dane Cook	Dwight Slade	Paul Nardizzi	J.R. Brow
1996	David Crowe	Jerry Miner	Milt Abel	Mike Uryga	John Alston
1997	James Inman	Chris McGuire	Don Friesen	Bobby Tessel	James P. Connolly
1998	Vinnie Favorito	James P. Connolly	Mickey Joseph	Ralphie May	Scott Silverman
1999	Don Friesen	Robert Duchaine	Paul D'Angelo	John Alston	Daniel Packard
2000	Danny Bevins	Darryl Lennox	Dave Russo	Ron Osbourne	Rick D'Elia
2001	Bengt Washburn	Auggie Smith	Robert Mac	Floyd J. Phillps	Dave Burleigh
2002	Gerry Dee	Vargus Mason	Dobie Maxwell	Chris Mata	Arlo Stone
2003	Rob Pue	Joe Klocek	Darryl Lennox	Lamont Ferguson	Rob Little
2004	Jim Short	Eric Schwartz	Nathan Trenholm	Sadiki Fuller	Tommy Savitt
2005	Don Friesen	Dave Burleigh	Cain Lopez	Kevin Avery	Floyd J. Phillips
2006	Jay Wendell Walker	Leo Flowers	Mo Mandel	Mike E. Winfield	Dylan Mandelsohn
2007	Paul Ogata	David Van Avermaete	Mike Baldwin	Dennis Gaxiola	Kellen Erskine
2008	Steve White	Derek Lengwenus	Tyler Boeh	Brent Weinbach	Leif Skyving
2009	Tom Simmons	Danny Bevins	Maureen Langan	Jarrod Harris	Rodger Lizaola
2010	Auggie Smith	Tony Dijamco	Sammy Obeid	Kurt Swann	Solomon Georgio
2011	Sean Kent	Alex Koll	Sal Calanni	John Hastings	AJ Finney
2012	Tony Baker	Mike Merryfield	Prashanth Venkataramanujam	The Greg Wilson	Dave Williamson
2013	Samuel J. Comroe	Brendan Lynch	Drennon Davis	Sterling Scott	Matthew Broussard
2014	Kabir Singh	Dan Gabriel	Lars Callieou	John McClellan	Kurt Weitzmann
2015	Myles Weber	Pat Burtscher	Stuart Thompson	Rodger Lizaola	Ken Garr
2016	Alex Elkin	Trenton Davis	Mitch Burrow	Ehsan Ahmad	Chris Griffin
2017	Ellis Rodriguez	Tyrone Hawkins	Mark Smalls	Matt McClowry	Chris Bennett
2018	Dave Nihill	Cristian Machado	Dauood Naimyar	Mike Baldwin	Kris Tinkle
2019	Sterling Scott	Gina Stahl-Haven	Anthony K	Pauline Yasuda	Clay Newman
2020	No competition due to COVID-19 pandemic				
2021	Ryan Goodcase	James Hancock III	Chelsea Bearce	Orion Levine	Ian Levy
2022	Chris Riggins	Wyatt Cote	Mario Hodge	Max Eddy	Joe Abousakher
2023	Gary Anderson	Luca Cupani	Marcus Williams	Paco Romane	Chad Opitz
2024	Frankie Marcos	Shaheen Khal	Marcus Howard	Dvontre Coleman	Dan Aguinaga
2025	Shawn Felipe	CJ Koepp	Jalisa Robinson	Emo Majok	Alisha Dhillon

== Notable ==
Marsha Warfield, in 1979, became the competition's first African-American winner and its first female winner. She is also the only woman to win in the entire history of the SFICC.

Among the big names who entered, but did not advance to the semi-finals are Roseanne Barr, Janeane Garofalo, Bobcat Goldthwait, Christopher Titus and D.L. Hughley.

Don Friesen won in 1999 and again in 2005, making him the only person to have won the competition more than once.

Paul Ogata's win in 2007 was the first by an Asian-American comedian in 32 years of the competition.

After 44 years of holding the event annually, the competition did not run during 2020 due to the COVID-19 pandemic. The competition returned in 2021.
