= Ryan Stout =

American stand-up comedian and television host

- Born: Ryan Matthew Stout; September 30, 1982 (age 44); Cleveland, Ohio

Comedy career
- Years active: 2001–present
- Genre: Comedy

Ryan Matthew Stout (born September 30, 1982) is an American stand-up comedian and television host.

== Early life ==
Stout was born in Cleveland, Ohio, grew up in El Paso, Texas, and graduated from J.M. Hanks High School in 2000. He attended The College of Santa Fe (now Santa Fe University of Art and Design) as a Theater Arts major (2000–2001), but left the school after his first year. He later enrolled at San Francisco State University as a Creative Writing major.

Stout first performed stand-up on his seventeenth birthday at a high school talent show. He continued to perform, although only a handful of times, at various poetry open-mics while attending the College of Santa Fe. In June 2001 he moved to San Francisco, California where the comedy scene allowed him more frequent stage time. He ingrained himself there for the next few years, performing over three hundred shows each year.

He was one of the last residents of the San Francisco Comedy Condo.

Ryan Stout was awarded the Eagle Scout rank in 1997 and is a member of the National Eagle Scout Association.

As of March 2006, he lives in Los Angeles.

== Career ==
Ryan Stout is the winner of the 2005 Boston Comedy Festival. He is also one of the few comedians to perform at both HBO's The Comedy Festival in Las Vegas and HBO's U.S. Comedy Arts Festival in Aspen, CO. He made his television debut on Comedy Central's Live at Gotham in 2007. That same year he filmed pilot episodes for two separate television shows for MTV, "I.Q." and a remake of the hit show "Singled Out," co-hosted by, Miss USA 2006, Tara Conner. By the end of the year MTV had him hosting the talk show A Shot at Love: The Hangover. In early 2008, he hosted a special called MTV's Most Valuable Players, went on to host MTV's Spring Break 2008, and hosted a series called MTV's Ranked. Concurrent with his television work he continued doing stand-up throughout the United States and performed at the Just For Laughs International Comedy Festival in Montreal, Quebec, Canada. Hosting opportunities continued at MTV, including several more game show pilots and conducting reunion episodes of several of the network's reality shows. He also started making appearances on WGN's The Bob and Tom Show and E! Entertainment Television's Chelsea Lately.

Most recently, his Comedy Central Presents half-hour stand-up special premiered on April 30, 2010 which earned him the #10 spot in Comedy Central's yearly Stand-up Showdown in 2011. Later that year Stout made his late-night stand-up debut on Conan.

His debut album Touché was released on December 6, 2011, on Comedy Central Records.

Ryan Stout was guest on The CTSM Jan 30th 2012.

On August 6, 2012, he appeared on WTF with Marc Maron.

He was featured as "The Announcer" in the "Crickets" music video for hip hop group Drop City Yacht Club.

On January 27, 2016, he appeared on Comedy Central’s program @midnight with Chris Hardwick

=== Television ===
Year	Title	Role	Notes
2007	‘’IQ: Idiot Quest’’	Himself (host)	Pilot - MTV - Game show
2007	‘’Singled Out’’	Himself (host)	Pilot (Re-make) - MTV - Game show
2007	‘’Live at Gotham’’	Himself / Comedian	1 episode - Comedy Central
2007–08	‘’A Shot at Love: The Hangover’’	Himself / Host	9 episodes
2008	‘Pop-A-Razzi’’	Himself (host)	Pilot - MTV - Game show
2008	“More Amore”	Himself (host)	6 Episodes - MTV
2008	‘’Ranked’’	Himself / Host	3 Episodes - MTV
2010	‘’Comedy Central Presents’’	Himself / Comedian	30-minute Stand-up Special
2011	Conan	Guest / Comedian	Episode: “The Candy Man Can’t”
2009–14	‘’Chelsea Lately’’	Roundtable Comedian	52 episodes
2013	‘’AXS Live’’	Himself / Host	45 episodes
2013	‘’AXS TV's New Years Bash’’	Himself / Host	Television special
2014	‘’Grammy Prediction Special’’	Himself / Host	Television special
2014	‘’AXS TV's Super Party Super Special’’	Himself / Host	Television special
2014	‘’AXS TV's Super Party’’	Himself / Host	3 episodes
2014–15	‘’MOCKpocalypse’’	Himself / Comedian	25 episodes
2015–present	‘’Fameless’’	Various Roles	Recurring
2016–17	‘’@midnight’’	Himself / Comedian / Contestant	3 Episodes

=== Web ===
Year	Title	Role	Notes
2014	‘’Mandatory Viewing’’	Himself / Host	32 Episodes
2014	‘’The Pre-Game’’	Himself / Guest	2 Episodes
