= Carrie Snow =

American screenwriter

- Born: Carrie Snow Peletz; July 16, 1953 (age 73); Merced, California, U.S.
- Education: University of California, Berkeley

Comedy career
- Medium: Stand-up, television, film, writing
- Genres: Improvisational comedy, observational comedy

Carrie Snow (born July 16, 1953) is an American stand-up comedian, writer, author, and host from Merced, California. She is best known for writing for the television series Roseanne, and acting on the show. Snow was also featured in the documentaries The Aristocrats and Wisecracks.

Snow has performed at and headlined at such stand-up venues as Caroline's, The Punch Line, The Improv (various locations), The Comedy Store, and Caesars Palace in Las Vegas.

In addition to performing on the road, she has regularly been seen on television doing numerous stand-up ensemble shows from PBS' Comedy Tonight which she later hosted for two seasons, and An Evening at the Improv; she has also appeared as a guest on Cristina & Friends and performed her routine on numerous talk shows, such as The Sally Jessy Raphael Show, The Late Show With David Letterman, Leeza, as well as Comedy Central, of which one performance was nominated for an Emmy Award.

== Early life ==
Snow was born in 1953 in Merced, CA. Born with the name Carrie Snow Peletz, she later shortened it to Carrie Snow because she felt that her given name would “look lousy on a marquee.”

In the first few years of her life, Snow began to develop a difficult relationship with food. Snow identifies that these issues started when she was seven years old. Snow would continue to live with these struggles into adulthood and often incorporates these experiences into her stand-up routines.

From a young age Snow was known for having an eccentric personality. In her high school yearbook peers wrote “stay as crazy as you are.” Snow attributes her wacky temperament to her parents.

After graduating from high school, Snow attended the University of California, Berkeley, studying Rhetoric. A sharp and humorous person, Snow would spend time with friends in Aquatic Park of Aquatic Park Cove dressed up as Shirley Temple selling crotchless panties to tourists. Upon graduating, Snow briefly considered going to law school and started a master's program in business administrations at California State University at Hayward (currently California State University, East Bay). She ultimately did not continue. While living in the San Francisco Bay Area, Snow worked as a receptionist at Kaiser Oakland Medical Center in Oakland, California. It was around this time that Snow first tried her hand at comedy.

== Career ==
=== 1970s: Early Stand-up ===
Carrie Snow began performing stand-up in the Bay Area in the late 1970s. She made her first ten dollars while performing at San Francisco's Holy City Zoo in 1978. During this time San Francisco had a robust comedy scene and the Holy City Zoo had been “a fixture on the laugh circuit since 1974.” Comedians such as Robin Williams, Warren Thomas, and Paula Poundstone also frequented this comedy club.

In 1978, Snow finished 13th in a field of 40 in a local stand-up comedy competition. Snow reflects candidly on this placement as being “close, but no enchilada. The polish takes time,” recognizing that comedy takes practice.

=== 1980s and 1990s: Stand-up, writing, and acting ===
Still in the early stages of her career, Snow continued to perform in the Bay Area. At twenty-six years old she had been doing stand-up comedy for three years and was a regular at the Holy City Zoo. It was at this age and stage in her career that Snow saw an improvement in the time slots she received from owner Tony DePaul. Entertainment writer for the Los Angeles Times Marty Olmstead writes in 1980 that “Snow has become the golden-haired kid at the Zoo.”

Entering the San Francisco Comedy Competition again in 1982, she came in 5th at the 7th annual comedy competition. Snow was up against comedians Jim Samuels, Kevin Pollak, Jack Gallagher and Will Durst who placed first, second, third, and forth respectively.

Besides performing stand-up in San Francisco, Snow worked “several nights a week emceeing a male strip show at a club called Off Broadway.”

Snow traveled around the country to cities such as Las Vegas, Chicago, New York City. Snow drew from personal experiences and observations that she relayed to audiences in an imaginative style. At a show at Caroline's in New York in 1986, Variety’s New Acts section reviews that Snow "nicely creates a warped world where buying becomes “retail grazing” and any eyeliner or lipstick is replaced by a van load of cosmetics. It's when she stretched “normal” American behavior to the absurd that Carrie Snow's routine is at its best."

In the early 1980s Snow moved south to Los Angeles. It was here that she began performing at comedy clubs such as The Improv and The Comedy Store, and The Laff Stop's Newport Beach, California location.

Snow developed several bits that she would continue to use and modify over her entire career. One anecdote she often shared was from a visit from her father while she was attending the University of California, Berkeley. In an early variation of this bit from an episode of An Evening at the Improv that originally aired on June 22, 1993, Snow began with her reactions to reading about Sylvia Plath's experience seeing a naked man for the first time in The Bell Jar. Snow was struck by Plath's descriptions of the man and recalls that some areas of his body reminded her of turkey necks and turkey gizzards. Playing off the audience's laughter, Snow launches into the next segment about watching Philip Kaufman's Rising Sun (1992) with her father. She humorously describes her discomfort of seeing people eat sushi off each other's bodies with her father sitting next to her. Snow concludes the joke with playful sound effects and manipulates her pronunciations as she says “And I'm not looking at my fatherrrrr and my father's not looking at meeeee” concluding in a roar of laughter from the crowd.

==== Appearing on An Evening at the Improv ====
Carrie Snow appeared on A&E Network's An Evening at the Improv in Los Angeles in its early years and through the 1990s. From a 1989 show at The Improv, the Los Angeles Times' Duncan Strauss comments that “Snow is low-key and conversational.” In the same article he calls her show “Pretty close to an ideal synthesis of persona, delivery and material, because while many of her topics are wholly contemporary, much of her chatty style is a throwback to the approach of earlier female comics: self-deprecating, especially about her weight and her troubled dating life.” Snow often implemented a conversational style of stand-up to comment on her family, movies, food, and body image. In one of Snow's early performances on the show from October 9, 1981, she began her performance by announcing “my name's Carrie Snow. I'm fat, but I'm hot.”

==== Writing on Roseanne ====
During the 1980s and 1990s Snow knew and worked with fellow comedian Roseanne Barr of Roseanne. Snow met Barr at The Comedy Store when she first came to Los Angeles in the 1980s and the women became closer through Barr's show and when Snow helped her through her gastric bypass surgery.

Snow had been doing comedy for fifteen years before she began writing for Roseanne. She wrote on the show for five years, which included the last three seasons until she was fired. In an interview with the Las Vegas Sun's Allison Duck, Snow describes the writing environment and that “Roseanne writers, when we see each other, it's like we were POWs together.”

While writing for Roseanne Snow briefly tried acting and realized she hated it. In the same interview with Duck, Snow recalls that “With the writing you got to be funny sitting with the writers with your feet up and as a performer you had to sit there like a piece of veal and makeup and a dress and it wasn't that much fun. My head wasn't there. It was so much fun though, to finally find out I wasn't an actress. It was very freeing for me.”

==== Other appearances ====
Snow was invited to shows and events outside of performing stand-up. This included talk shows and local events hosted by colleges and universities. She appeared on the short lived talk show Cristina & Friends hosted by Cristina Ferrare. On the show, Snow participated in fun and spontaneous conversations ranging from penile implants, Christmas shopping, and Snow's “new breasts”.

Snow assisted emerging comics with their material. She observed a comedy program hosted by the UCLA Extension's Division of Performing and Integrated Arts. In the student competitors' auditions at The Improv, participant Richard Rothenstein “sold a joke to comic Carrie Snow (“She spent so much time ego-tripping, she got frequent-flyer miles.”).

=== 2000s, 2010s, and Beyond: Performing and other ventures ===
Snow stepped away from performing in the decade between the late 1990s and early 2000s and went through “the process of reclaiming her old audience and finding a new one.”

Once Snow returned from her hiatus, she continued to perform in the Los Angeles area, Lake Tahoe, and Las Vegas and has also taken on several projects outside of performing.

Snow developed her show “From Fat to Fabulous in Just 50 Years.”

Victoria Looseleaf from the Los Angeles Times describes how this “60-minute diet Odyssey tail is one that differs from traditional stand up and that it reveals--as much through affecting monologues as witty shtick--the inner Snow.”

While Snow was away, she also “created a one-woman show called “Carrie Snow: 7,000 Sailors Can't Be Wrong,” a winning blend of comedy and autobiography.” Chad Jones of the East Bay Times writes in his article “Ankles Away! Svelte Snow Returns with Sassy ‘Sailors.’” that “Snow's 90-minute journey through her pain as an obese woman, her decision to have the surgery and her adjustment to life minus 100 pounds is hilarious and, in parts, moving.”

In his article, Jones recognizes that “‘7,000 Sailors’ is still a work in progress. Several times during Friday's show, Snow said something fresh or funny and stopped to make a note of it in her script, which she still refers to frequently.”

In the 2000s once Snow returned to performing, she appeared at venues such as The Comedy & Magic Club, The Sharky's Lounge at Paradise Casino, The Ventura Harbor Comedy Club, and The Improv at Harveys in Lake Tahoe.

In the early 2000s Snow was featured in the documentary The Aristocrats (2005). Snow recalls that in her clips she's explaining how she was friends with fellow comedian and actor Bob Saget had explained the joke to her and being let in on it was “like being anointed” into the comic community.

==== Other ventures ====
Outside of stand-up and performing Snow has been writing a book, My Mom's Meaner Than Your Mom: True Stories of Mean Mothers. Snow had a hard time finding the arc of the book but it's ultimately about surviving. Specifically, how she uses humor to survive and live with a mean and crazy mom. The book is done and Snow is currently looking for a publisher.

Developing a line of breathing oils is another enterprise Snow has ventured into.

== Comedic style and Advocacy ==
Carrie Snow uses conversational, observational, improvisational, and self-deprecation styles in her stand-up comedy. Themes and subjects range from body image and her relationship with food, her shopping tendencies, her family, and her sex life. Snow kept a joke book and recalls that she “Would write jokes down and move them to the back and that's how I would infiltrate new jokes.”

In October 2015 ahead of Snow's show at The Tahoe Improv, commenting on her comedic influences, she, “talks very highly of physical comedic legends such as Lucille Ball, Phyllis Diller and Joan Rivers. But she realized that being funny transcends gender saying, ‘If you are a real comic, man or woman, your act is who you are.’ But, she added, ‘I think women bring a deeper context.’”

Throughout Snow's career she has been outspoken about challenges women in comedy experience. Specifically, the differences in treatment between male and female comics with booking shows, pay gaps, and comments women get on their appearances.

Speaking to her own experiences with these issues, Snow has reflected on “the money that I used to make when I thought I was making money even though it all went to diets and reupholstering myself and I think ‘oh my God they were paying the guys twenty-two times more.’ They were getting door deals, I thought that Bill Graham and everybody I thought they were my friends. They pay me like $2500 in cash and I put it in my bra and go ‘man that's livin.’ And not realizing that the guys were getting twice as much.”

Snow's writing jobs have also related to her desire to see more opportunities open up for women comedians. In journalist Yale Kohen's book, We Killed: The Rise of Women in American Comedy, Snow states, “We really thought that when Roseanne got on The Tonight Show, it was going to open it up for women comics.” While writing for an appearance Barr made on The Tonight Show, she hoped that this event would inspire more opportunities for female comics, and yet it did not have the effect she'd hoped for.

Snow emerged as a stand-up comedian in the boom years of comedy. This period had gendered dynamics where writer and occasional comedian Merrill Markoe details that during the boom years “at the time, stand-up was really a man's world. Women were trying to forge way in but there wasn't much in the way of a welcoming committee.”

Snow was not immune to seeing how other female comics navigated the scene and wanted to see and support more women comics. This hope for women comics connects with Snow's rocky history with The Comedy Store owner Mitzi Shore. Snow was frustrated with Shore and how her feud with Budd Friedman negatively impacted how she was booked for stand-up. Snow was one of several critics Shore had. Others included comedian Sandra Bernhard and actor Roberta Kent. Kohen asserts that “women felt like she [Shore] ghettoized them.”

Today, Snow sees that “there is such a generation of women that have found alternative places to perform.”

== Personal life ==
Carrie Snow grew up in a Jewish family. Snow was close with her father when he was alive and her mother died in 2013. Snow is close with her sister Meri-Ann Lawson.

In 1994 while writing for Roseanne, Snow decided to get gastric bypass surgery. Snow, “having been through the stomach surgery experience, Snow has guided a number of women through the procedure.” Including supporting Barr with the same surgery.

Snow is candid about this period of her life, “Recalling a low point in the early ’90s, Snow says she didn't realize just how depressed she was until she did her laundry and ‘discovered it was all pajamas.’” Since having a gastric bypass surgery and experiencing this weight loss Snow describes the experience as getting “to be as close to a person as I have imagined.”

Carrie Snow experienced a stroke in 2018. She was released from the hospital and greeted by her dog TJ upon arriving home.

== Accolades and Appearances ==
=== Accolades ===
- 1978, placed 13th at the 3rd annual San Francisco Comedy Competition
- 1982, placed 5th at the 7th annual San Francisco Comedy Competition
- Snow received a local Emmy nomination for her performance on Comedy Tonight.

=== Appearances ===
- Aired October 9, 1981, An Evening at the Improv, Season 2, episode 15, “Christopher Lee, Bob Saget, Glenn Hirsch, Carrie Snow, and Paul ‘Mousie’ Garner”
- Aired December 30, 1989, An Evening at the Improv, Season 5, episode 1, “Sarah Purcell, Chris Raine, Glenn Super and more"
- Aired May 5, 1990, An Evening at the Improv, Season 5, episode 19, “Greg Evigan, Glenn Hirsch, Greg Otto and more”
- Aired November 14, 1992, An Evening at the Improv, Season 11, episode 6, “Danny Gerrard, John Hardwick, Howard Busgang, and more!”
- Aired June 22, 1993, An Evening at the Improv, Season 13, episode 24, “Brad Garrett, Roger Kabler, Vince Valenzuela, and more!”
- Aired October 24, 1995, Roseanne, ep. “The Last Date”
- Aired April 25, 2018, Karen and Kira Can Read podcast, “Ep. 57: Carrie Snow”
- Aired May 23, 2018, The Wonderful Wizards of Oilz podcast, ep. “Carrie Snow's Nose Knows Inhalers”
- Aired October 18, 2020, The Comedy Store (TV Mini-Series documentary), ep. "The Wild Bunch"

=== Acting credits ===
- Bachelorette Party, 1984
- Running Mates (TV Movie),1992
- Roseanne (TV Series), ep."The Last Date" (1995)
- Hot Date (Short), 2006
- COPS: Skyrim (TV Series), 2014

=== Writing and editing credits ===
- Roseanne, (story by) (3 episodes, 1995–1996)
- Roseanne, (teleplay by) (3 episodes, 1995–1996)
- Roseanne, (written by) (3 episodes, 1995–1996)
- Roseanne, story editor (23 episodes, 1996–1997)
- The Roseanne Show (4 episodes, writer - 1 episode, 1998)

== Legacy ==
Several excerpts and one liners from Snow's work have been featured in anthologies of funny women and America's funniest women. Author and literary agent Bill Adler's book Funny Ladies: The Best Humor from America's Funniest Women includes Snow's one liner: “a male gynecologist is like an auto mechanic who has never owned a car.” Snow is included in this collection of “words of advice for inspiration” along with comedians such as Mae West, Elayne Boosler, and Whoopi Goldberg. Several of Snow's one liners are also featured in The Penguin Book of Women's Humor by Regina Barreca (1996).

Carrie Snow is described as a bawd in Joanne Gilbert's chapter “‘My Mom's a C***’: New Bawds Ride the Fourth Wave" in Transgressive Humor of American Women Writers. She defines bawd as being “the most overtly sexual persona of the five rhetorical postures female comics in the USA have historically assumed on stage.”

Gilbert asserts that some of Snow's female contemporaries were “Emboldened by second wave—and ultimately, third wave—feminism, and more aggressive than their precursors, notable bawds of the 1970s, 1980s, and 1990s included the ‘Divine Miss M.,’ Bette Midler, La Wanda Page, Carrie Snow, Angela Scott, Adrienne Tolsch, Caroline Rhea, Stephanie Hodge, and Thea Vidale—all important voices that paved the way for contemporary comics like Silverman, Schumer, and Holly Lorka, who performs bawdy humor from a lesbian perspective."

== External reviews ==
- Official website
- Carrie Snow at IMDb
