= Kelsey Cook =

American stand-up comedian

- Kelsey Cook performing in Amsterdam, November 2026
- Born: April 10, 1989 (age 37); Spokane, Washington, U.S.
- Education: Washington State University

Comedy career
- Years active: 2009–present
- Medium: Stand-up; television; film
- Genres: Observational comedy; Self-deprecation; Stand-up
- Website: kelseycook.com

Kelsey Cook is an American stand-up comedian. Her first two comedy specials, The Hustler (2023) and Mark Your Territory (2025), were released on YouTube and later made available on Hulu. Her third special, Happy Hour, was released on Netflix in August 2026.

== Career ==
Cook began performing stand-up comedy while in college. After graduating, she moved to Seattle and then to Los Angeles to pursue comedy full-time. In 2022, she taped her first special, The Hustler, which debuted on her YouTube channel and was later picked up by Hulu.

Her second special, Mark Your Territory, was released in February 2025. It was taped live at Comedy on State in Madison, Wisconsin and is available on YouTube and Hulu. The special covers themes of personal growth, heartbreak, and starting over after a divorce.

Cook made her late-night debut in March 2018 on The Tonight Show Starring Jimmy Fallon, where she has since appeared multiple times as a featured stand-up comic. She also appeared on Comedy Central's storytelling series This Is Not Happening, in an online-only bonus segment for Season Four's episode 10 ("Shame"). Cook has performed at the Moontower Just For Laughs Comedy Festival in Austin—appearing at venues including The Hideout Theatre in April 2022—and appeared at the 2019 Just for Laughs Festival in Montreal.

== Personal life ==
Cook grew up in Spokane, Washington. Cook's mother, foosball champion Kathy Brainard, met her father, poet, trumpeter, and amateur foosball player Chris Cook, at a professional foosball competition. Cook graduated from Cheney High School.

Cook became engaged to comedian Kane Holloway in 2018; they married on July 11, 2019, and divorced in 2020 amid the COVID‑19 pandemic.

Cook's relationship with comedian Chad Daniels was announced in March 2023. They married in 2026.

== Filmography ==
=== Stand-up specials ===
Year	Title	Notes
2023	The Hustler	800 Pound Gorilla Media specials
2025	Mark Your Territory	800 Pound Gorilla Media specials
2026	Happy Hour	Netflix Originals special

=== Web series ===
Year	Title	Notes
2018-2020	Wrists of Fury	Creator, executive producer
