= Edwin San Juan =

Filipino American actor and comedian

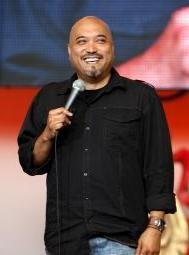
- Edwin San Juan performing.
- Born: February 24, 1969 (age 57); Philippines

Comedy career
- Years active: 1996 – present
- Medium: Stand-up, television, actor
- Genre: Comedy
- Subjects: Filipino American culture, race relations, satire

Edwin San Juan (born February 24, 1969) is a Filipino American actor and comedian known for sharing his multicultural life experiences, observational humor, and word play, as well as poking fun at ethnic stereotypes. He is the creator and executive producer of "SlantED Comedy," a showcase of Asian American standup comedians televised on Showtime.

== Career ==
San Juan's first film appearance was in "I'm Not Like That No More" (2010), a comedy co-starring Felipe Esparza and Paul Rodriguez. He has entertained American troops on the USO tour "Around the World in Eight Days" and made TV appearances including Comedy Central's Live at Gotham, "Comics without Borders" on Showtime, "The Payaso Comedy Slam" on both Showtime and Comedy Central, Comics Unleashed with Byron Allen on ABC, UPN's "Live from Hollywood," BET's Comic View, Galavision's "Que Locos" and "Loco Comedy Jam," Si TV's "Latino Laugh Festival," "Inside Joke" and "Latino 101," "Destination Stardom" on NBC and "International Sexy Ladies Show" on G4 TV. He was also grand champion of "Talent Agency" on UPN, with nine consecutive victories.

He performs nightly as resident headliner for Las Vegas LIVE Comedy Club at the V Theater, Planet Hollywood. Las Vegas Weekly named him best comedian on the Las Vegas Strip for 2015.
