= Umar Rana =

Pakistani stand-up comedian based in Singapore

- Born: Karachi, Pakistan
- Notable work: Producer and host of Comedy Masala

Comedy career
- Medium: Stand-up
- Website: www.comedymasala.com

Umar Rana is a Pakistani stand-up comedian based in Singapore.

== Early life ==
Umar Rana was born in Karachi, Pakistan.

== Career ==
Umar began his comedy career performing improv. He was a founding member of Pakistan's first English-speaking improv troupe, Blackfish, created by Saad Haroon, which represented Pakistan in an international youth theatre festival called "Contacting the World" at Contact Theatre in Manchester, England.

He later moved to Bahrain because of a job posting and, in January 2007, moved to Singapore.

After performing in many improv shows and stand-up comedy events, in September 2010 Rana founded Comedy Masala. Comedy Masala offers a weekly open mic in Singapore and brings in comedians from across Asia. He has also hosted many events, including Rob Schneider's stand-up comedy performance in Singapore.

He was second runner-up at the 2009 HK International Comedy Festival.
