= Chad Daniels =

American comedian (born 1975)

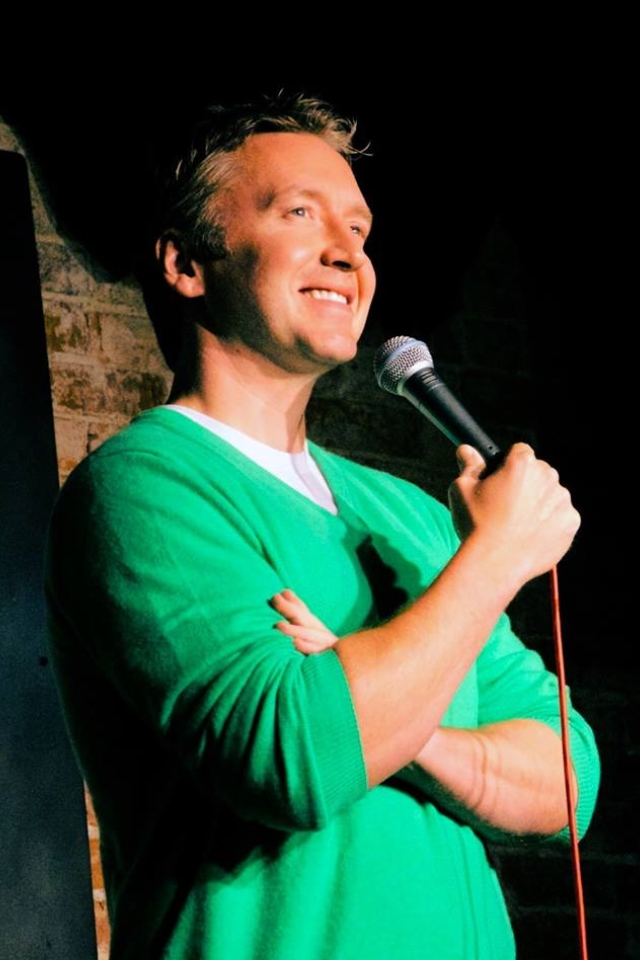
- Daniels performing in 2013
- Born: March 2, 1975 (age 51); Fergus Falls, Minnesota, U.S.
- Children: 2

Comedy career
- Years active: 1998–present
- Medium: Stand-up
- Website: chaddaniels.com

Chad Daniels (born March 2, 1975) is an American stand-up comedian. His albums have reached the top 10 on the Billboard comedy charts three times: No. 2 for 2017's Footprints On The Moon, No. 6 for 2019's Dad Chaniels, and No. 7 for 2014's Natural Selection. As of 2019, Daniels' albums have been streamed more than 700 million times. Footprints on the Moon also reached No. 1 on the iTunes comedy chart.

In 2020, the entertainment website Vulture.com called Daniels "one of the great unsung American comedians right now, who has some of the best stuff about being a dad out there."

== Early life ==
Daniels was born March 2, 1975, in Fergus Falls, Minnesota. He graduated from Fergus Falls High School in 1993.

== Career ==
=== Stand-up comedy ===
Daniels performing in 2026 with Kelsey Cook at Boom Chicago, Amsterdam

Daniels' comedy is known for what Allmusic critic Mark Deming described as a "skewed, often dark view" on domestic family life.

He started performing standup at an open mic night at ACME Comedy Company in Minneapolis in 1998. His performance earned him a job as house emcee at Grand Forks, North Dakota, comedy club Westward Ho, hosting six shows a week in 1998–1999. Daniels has also performed at Hilarities comedy club in Cleveland.

In 2003, Daniels was a finalist in Comedy Central’s Laugh Riots competition.

In 2009, he was named Artist of the Year in comedy by Minneapolis alt-weekly City Pages, which said "Plenty of comics have jokes about marriage and children, but few speak about the experience with such uncompromising honesty."

He has toured extensively in the U.S. and across the world. In 2012, he won the $10,000 grand prize at the Gilda's LaughFest competition in Grand Rapids, Michigan. He also performed at the Just for Laughs Festival in Montreal in 2004 and 2012, Limestone Comedy Festival, Akumal Comedy Festival, World Comedy Festival, and the Aspen Comedy Festival, where he won the Comic's Comic award.

He hosts a weekly podcast, Middle of Somewhere, with fellow comedian Cy Amundson.

He hosts another weekly podcast, Pretend Problems, with his wife and fellow comedian Kelsey Cook.

=== Television and film ===
Daniels' 2008 Comedy Central Presents half-hour special was named fifth-best all-time special by viewers in the network's 2010 Stand-Up Showdown. He has also starred in two hour-long specials, 2012's As Is and 2019's Dad Chaniels.

He is featured in J. Elvis Weinstein's documentary I Need You To Kill.

He has also appeared on The Tonight Show with Conan O’Brien (one of only 13 comics to appear on that version of the show), O’Brien’s TBS talk show Conan, The Late Late Show with both Craig Kilborn and Craig Ferguson, Live at Gotham, The Bob and Tom Show, and Laugh Riots.

In July 2024, Daniels released a Netflix stand-up special, Empty Nester, which was filmed at the Fitzgerald Theater in Saint Paul, Minnesota.

=== Albums ===
Daniels has released seven albums: three with Stand Up! Records, three with 800 Pound Gorilla Records, and his self-produced debut.

Richard Lanoie of The Serious Comedy Site called Daniels "a smart, funny, surprising stand-up whose comedy will stand the test of time." He and Brett Watson both named You’re The Best in the website's top 10 comedy albums of 2012; Lanoie called it "a superb, brilliant, smart, very funny, original album." Lanoie called 2014's Natural Selection "funny and original". Reviewing Natural Selection, Chris Spector of Midwest Record said "Daniels keeps the laughs coming (in) rapid-fire fashion without any misses." Jake Austen of Roctober magazine, reviewing his early albums, was impressed that Daniel could deliver "domesticated, regular-guy" humor about families and airline food "yet manages not to lose his edge."

== Personal life ==
Daniels has a son and a daughter from his first marriage. He married fellow comedian Kelsey Cook in August 2026.

== Discography ==
- Two Minutes for Stale Hacking (self-released)
- Busy Being Awesome (Stand Up! Records, 2009)
- You're the Best (Stand Up! Records, 2012)
- Natural Selection (Stand Up! Records, 2014)
- Footprints on the Moon (800 Pound Gorilla Records, 2017)
- Dad Chaniels (800 Pound Gorilla Records, 2019)
- Twelfth Night (800 Pound Gorilla Records, 2021)
- Mixed Reviews (2023)

== Filmography ==
=== Film ===
- As Is (2012)
- I Need You To Kill (2017)
- Dad Chaniels (2019)
- Mixed Reviews (2023)
- Empty Nester (2024)
- For Reels (2025)

=== Television ===
- The Late Late Show with Craig Kilborn
- Live at Gotham (2006)
- Comedy Central Presents (2008)
- The Tonight Show with Conan O'Brien (2009)
- The Bob and Tom Show (2010)
- Conan (2012, 2014, 2018)
- The Late Late Show with Craig Ferguson (2012)
- After Midnight (2023)
