= Saad Haroon =

Pakistani comedian, actor, and writer

- Born: Pakistan
- Education: University of Massachusetts Amherst

Comedy career
- Years active: 2001–present
- Medium: Stand-up; television; film; writing
- Genres: Political/news satire; observational comedy

Saad Haroon is a Pakistani comedian, actor, and writer. He is known for being the creator of the first ever Pakistani improvisational comedy troupe "BlackFish" in 2002, and was the first Pakistani stand-up comedian to perform in English in cities across Pakistan in his tour "Saad Haroon: Very Live", in 2008. Haroon created and hosted the first ever English-language comedy television show in Pakistan, called The Real News, in 2007.

== Early life and education ==
Saad Haroon was born in Pakistan.

He attended University of Massachusetts Amherst in the United States, graduating in 2001. He returned to Pakistan soon after the September 11 attacks, a very dark time, and decided to use comedy to make people feel happier.

== Career ==
Saad Haroon is a comedian, actor, and writer in Pakistan.

=== Improv and live shows ===
In 2002, Haroon created BlackFish, Pakistan's first improv comedy troupe, which was chosen to represent Pakistan in an international youth theatre project called "Contacting the World", held at Contact Theatre in Manchester, England, in 2004. As of August 2004, the eight members of the troupe were: Haroon; Umar Rana; Sanam Saeed; Sami Shah; Cyrus Viccaji; Ishma Alvi; Faris Khalid; and Yasser Salehjee. Haroon stepped down as director of BlackFish in 2005 to pursue other projects, but continued to work on other projects with Contact Theatre, including World Wide Jam around 2006. He performed at the Dubai Community Theatre in Dubai in 2007.

Haroon then created another comedy troupe, called SHARK. In 2008, SHARK became the first improv troupe to tour Pakistan and perform longform improv. SHARK's tour included performances in Karachi, Islamabad, and Lahore, where audiences witnessed musical forms of improv comedy and a longform improv structure known as "the Harold" for the first time. SHARK's lineup included Haroon, Danish Ali, Umair Pervez, Jaffar Ali, Daniyal Ahmed, Sohaib Khan, and Sana Nasir.

Haroon was the first Pakistani stand-up comedian to perform in English in cities across Pakistan in his tour "Saad Haroon: Very Live", in 2008.

Haroon was the creator, co-writer, and director of We've made contact; a half-improvised, half-scripted original format play created for the British Council's "Connecting Futures" project, performed in Manchester, England.

=== TV ===
The Real News was Pakistan's first ever English-language TV comedy show in Pakistan, created and hosted by Haroon and launched in 2007. Created and hosted by Haroon, the show pokes fun at current news events using political and social satire.

Haroon's video sketch was selected by Conan O'Brien as part of the opening monologue for his talk show Conan. His sketch was about how people in Pakistan enjoyed O'Brien's talk show.

== Other activities ==
As of 2007, Haroon was arranging open mic nights, featuring aspiring comedians, writers, poets, and other talented enthusiasts.

In 2011, Haroon became a star on the Internet with is parody of the Roy Orbison song "Oh, Pretty Woman", titled "Burka Woman".

== Recognition ==
In October 2014, Haroon was voted the second funniest person in the world, securing 59,213 votes in the Laugh Factory competition.
