= Spoken Giants =

American spoken word rights administration company

- Trade name: Spoken Giants
- Type: Public rights organization
- Founded: 2019; 7 years ago
- Founders: Ryan Bitzer, Damion Greiman, Jim King
- Headquarters: Nashville, Tennessee,
- Website: www.spokengiants.com

Spoken Giants is a global rights administration company for the owners and creators of spoken word copyrights. Spoken Giants represents comedians, podcast authors, speech writers, and other spoken word creators.

== Origin ==
Spoken Giants was formed by 800 Pound Gorilla Records founders Ryan Bitzer and Damion Greiman, with former BMI executive Jim King who recognized the need for an organization to account for uncollected royalties for “spoken word” artists, including comedians, podcasters and public speakers.

== Representation ==
Among the hundreds of performers Spoken Giants represents are Mike Birbiglia, Dan Cummins, Gerry Dee, Pete Holmes, Kyle Kinane, Kathleen Madigan, the Ralphie May Estate, and Theo Von. The company also added to its roster, the estates of Bob Hope and Desilu (Lucille Ball and Desi Arnaz) as well as Gabriel Iglesias, Larry the Cable Guy, Elayne Boosler, Jackie Fabulous, Eddie Pepitone, Nephew Tommy, Jeff Dye, Todd Barry, as well as Tom Segura, Tiffany Haddish, Jeff Foxworthy, Patton Oswalt. Spoken Giants also represents works on record labels such as Comedy Central Records, Comedy Dynamics, Stand Up Records, Team Coco Records and others.

== Rights disputes ==
=== Spotify ===
A conflict between Spoken Giants and Spotify originated several months prior to a rights dispute that was raised, after Spoken Giants initiated discussions with streaming services, SiriusXM, and terrestrial radio stations. The company argued that comedians should receive royalties for their written material in addition to the audio recordings of their performances. Spoken Giants, sought to have its clients compensated similarly to those of the music world.

On November 24, 2021, without advance warning, digital streaming provider Spotify removed thousands of comedy tracks including those of Robin Williams, John Mulaney, Mike Birbiglia, Jeff Foxworthy, and more in a response to collection of literary royalties on behalf of comedians.

In a statement, the Spoken Giants said,

“Spotify has paid significant amounts of money for the content in question, and would love to continue to do so. However, given that Spoken Giants is disputing what rights various licensors have, it’s imperative that the labels that distribute this content, Spotify and Spoken Giants come together to resolve this issue to ensure this content remains available to fans around the globe.”

Though some tracks were returned to the Spotify service, as of December 7, 2021 there was no agreement between Spoken Giants and Spotify and no word on the content being returned to the service.

In March 2023, it was confirmed by Motiversity that all content associated with spoken word or verbal performance genre had been removed from Spotify in U.S. territories due to an update in their Terms of Service.

=== Pandora ===
In 2022, a series of lawsuits was filed in California federal court alleging that Pandora Media, owned by SiriusXM, failed to obtain proper copyrights for streaming comedians' works. The estates of Robin Williams and George Carlin, along with comedians Andrew Dice Clay, Bill Engvall, and Ron White, claimed Pandora had not properly licensed their performances. The lawsuits argued that Pandora intentionally infringed on copyrights to remain competitive. Additionally, the lawsuit detailed how Pandora ignored licensing negotiations and improperly streamed Williams' works without payment, covering only sound recordings and not the underlying literary content. Pandora's financial filings from 2011 to 2017 acknowledged the risk of losing comedy content due to unlicensed works, a warning that was removed after its acquisition by SiriusXM. The plaintiffs sought $150,000 per infringement, totaling $8.4 million for Carlin's estate and $4.1 million for Williams' estate.

In response, Pandora countersued, filing an antitrust lawsuit against the comedians, accusing them of colluding with performing rights organisations Spoken Giants LLC and Word Collections Inc to monopolize comedy copyrights and inflate royalty rates.

On April 6, 2023, a Los Angeles federal judge dismissed Pandora Media's antitrust lawsuit, ruling that Pandora failed to demonstrate that the comedians and the organisations had sufficient power to dominate the comedy market.
