= Touché (Ryan Stout album) =

Live album by Ryan Stout
- Released: December 6, 2011
- Recorded: June 2011, Acme Comedy Company, Minneapolis, MN
- Genre: Comedy
- Length: 49:26
- Label: Comedy Central Records

Touché is the first album by the comedian Ryan Stout and was released digitally on December 6, 2011, by Comedy Central Records

== Track listing ==
No.	Title	Length
1.	"Prologue"	2:20
2.	"Initiation"	1:59
3.	"Deals"	3:17
4.	"Hybrid / Olé"	3:29
5.	"The 'N-Word'"	1:16
6.	"Euphemisms"	3:54
7.	"One Arm"	4:11
8.	"Afflictions"	3:31
9.	"8:15 / Surgeon"	3:33
10.	"Killing & Eating"	2:14
11.	"A New Diet"	3:50
12.	"Logic"	2:29
13.	"Equality"	4:02
14.	"Profanity"	3:15
15.	"Done"	1:26
16.	"Epilogue"	4:40

The title of the album comes from track 9, which deals with the Attack on Pearl Harbor. The album was released the day before Pearl Harbor Day 2011. Stout claims this was intentional.

Though, as discussed on track 14, there is no profanity up to that point in the album, the abrasive subject matter and controversial ideas still earned the record an EXPLICIT rating on iTunes and Amazon.

== Reception ==
Touché was met with positive reviews from Nerdist, The Serious Comedy Site, and Under The Gun Review.
