= James P. Connolly =

American actor

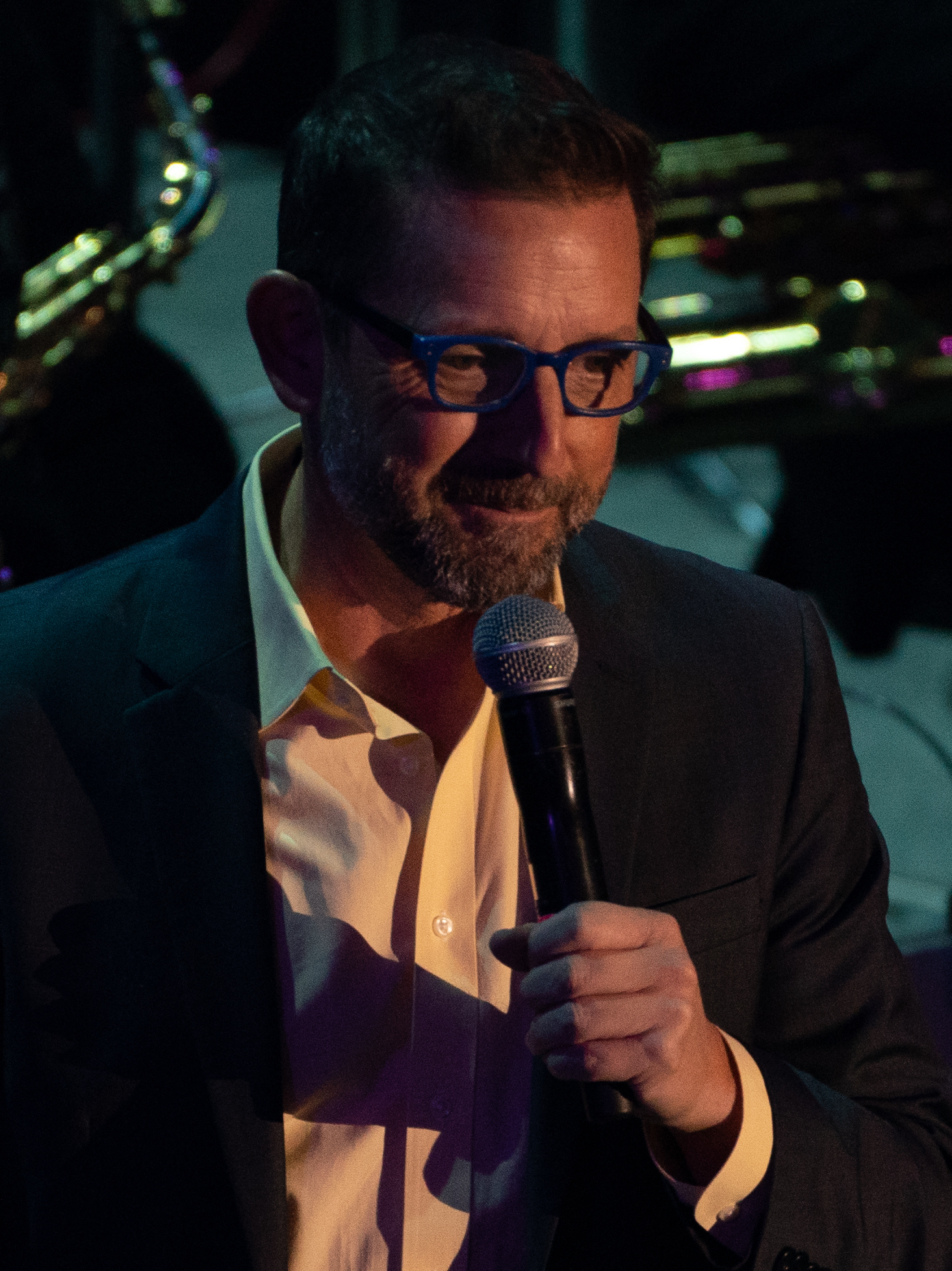
- Connolly in 2022
- Born: James P. Connolly; San Mateo, California, United States
- Spouse: Michelle Connolly (2006-2020)

Comedy career
- Years active: 1995–present
- Medium: Stand-up, television, radio
- Genres: Observational comedy, alternative comedy
- Subjects: pop culture, personal life, hipster
- Military career
- Allegiance: United States
- Branch: United States Marine Corps
- Rank: Captain
- Conflicts: Operation Just Cause (Panama), Operation Desert Shield, Operation Desert Storm
- Awards: Navy Commendation Medal, Combat Action Ribbon, Kuwait Liberation Medal, Southwest Asia Service Medal
- Website: jamespconnolly.tv

James P. Connolly is an American comedian and tv/radio host known for his frequent guest appearances on Larry Charles' Dangerous Word of Comedy on Netflix, America’s Got Talent, and on several SiriusXM Comedy Channels. In 2002, Connolly was named Grand Comedy Champion on Next Big Star, a television talent show hosted by Ed McMahon. He is one of the most played comedians on Sirius XM Comedy and a sought after host for Fortune 500 companies and global events.

== Early life ==
James P. Connolly was born and raised in San Mateo, California. He graduated from Aragon High School. He attended Harvard University on a Marine Corps ROTC Scholarship.

=== Military service ===
After college, Connolly was stationed at Marine Corps Base Camp Pendleton, rising to the rank of captain, and served in Operation Desert Shield and Operation Desert Storm. There, his commanding officer, commissioned Connolly to write jokes for an officer's roast, which Connolly credits as the start of his comedy career.

== Career ==
After a short stint as a karaoke DJ in San Diego, Connolly relocated to Los Angeles, California, where he began his comedy career at the World Famous Comedy Store in 1995 and worked as a Tour Guide at Universal Studios. Connolly began his career with a hipster onstage persona before losing the white jacket and the hipster style for a more contemporary look.

Connolly has appeared on Comedy Central and HBO. He won Grand Comedy Champion on Ed McMahon's short-lived talent show and has made multiple trips overseas to entertain the troops. He is a go-to for Fortune 500 companies and travels the world for events and meetings. Connolly hosted VH1's "Movie Obsessions" and "Live From Here" on XM Radio for National Lampoon. In October 2013, he recorded the SiriusXM Blue Collar Radio Comedy Concert at SirusXM's Nashville Studios.

=== Awards ===
Connolly was named Grand Comedy Champion on Next Big Star on TV Talent show hosted by Ed McMahon. He was awarded "Best of the Fest" at the San Luis Obispo Comedy Festival and four times in a row at the Burbank Comedy Festival. He was a finalist at the San Francisco International Comedy Competition (twice), Comedy Central National Stand Up Comedy Competition and the Boston Comedy Festival (twice).

== Discography ==
- Connolly, James P. (2006). The Master Plan (CD, Comedy/Spoken).
- Connolly, James P. (2004). Pure Polyester (CD, Comedy/Spoken).

== Television, film and radio ==
=== Television appearances ===
- Larry Charles’ Dangerous World of Comedy (2019)
- America's Got Talent (2017)
- Comics Unleashed (2015)
- Bob & Tom TV Show WGN (2008)
- An American Thanksgiving with Bryant Gumbel (2006)
- Latino Laugh Festival: The Show – Si Tv (2004)
- Movie Obsessions (2002)
- Next Big Star, w/Host Ed McMahon (2001–2002)
- Jerry Lewis Telethon (1997, 1998)
- Comedy Central – "Make Me Laugh" (1997)

=== Film ===
- Holding Lucid (2014)
- The Act (2004)
- Boxing's Been Good to Me (2000)

=== Radio ===
- SiriusXM Blue Collar Radio Comedy Concert
- Audible A Journey from Combat to Comedy
- Live From Here
- The Dork Forest with Jackie Kashian
- The Mother Funny Show by Kira Soltanovich
- Bob and Tom Radio Show
