= The Marijuana-Logues =

Live album (comedy) by Arj Barker, Doug Benson & Tony Camin
- Released: 2004
- Genre: Comedy
- Length: 1:02:40
- Label: Comedy Central
- Producer: Greg Hirsch, Jack Vaughn Jr.

The Marijuana-Logues is an Off-Broadway comedy show in New York City. Arj Barker, Doug Benson and Tony Camin are the creators and performers. It is a four-man stand-up comedy show, with the majority of the humor centered on the drug marijuana. The show's title is a play on the long-running Broadway show The Vagina Monologues. The show began its run in March 2004. There is also an original cast recording released in 2004 by Comedy Central, and a book. When the show toured, actor Tommy Chong became part of the tour for two cities. His legal concerns, including that audience members were actually smoking marijuana at some of the shows early in its tour, and pressure from his probation officer ultimately caused him to leave the show.

== Track listing ==
#	Title	Time
1	Ah, Marijuana	4:04
2	Legalize It	1:07
3	High on Life	1:14
4	Alleged Side Effects	2:23
5	Hemp Clothing	2:03
6	If Pot Could Talk	1:18
7	Wake and Bake	2:00
8	Get High School	2:33
9	Best Weed Ever	3:15
10	Cats Are Funny	1:07
11	This Just In	1:36
12	"Reality" TV	1:20
13	Fun Fact	0:32
14	Travel-Logues (One)	2:35
15	You Don't Even Know, Dude	2:01
16	Bittersweet Moment	2:28
17	Travel-Logues (Two)	1:27
18	Bong/Joint/Pipe	1:16
19	Girls are Funny	0:44
20	Seedy Dad	3:14
21	Letters to a Brand New Baggie	2:10
22	The Legend of 420	1:53
23	Un-fun Fact	1:14
24	Anti-Pot Ads	2:35
25	Fond Memories of a Bach Concert	4:11
26	Dumb Off	2:29
27	A List of Things	1:39
28	Unhappiest Place on Earth	3:11
29	Don't Smoke and Drive	2:57
30	Final Thoughts	2:04
