= Topaz Winters =

Singaporean writer

- Born: 1999 (age 26–27); United States
- Education: Princeton University
- Occupation: Poet
- Website: topazwinters.com

Topaz Winters (born 1999) is the pen name of Singaporean writer Priyanka Balasubramanian Aiyer. She is the author of the poetry collections Portrait of My Body as a Crime I'm Still Committing and So, Stranger.

== Early life and education ==
Winters was born in the United States and raised in Singapore. She attended Princeton University, where she studied English and creative writing.

== Career ==
Winters's chapbook poems for the sound of the sky before thunder was published by Math Paper Press in 2017. Her collection Portrait of My Body as a Crime I'm Still Committing was first published in 2019 and reissued by Button Poetry in 2024. Her collection So, Stranger was published by Button Poetry in 2022.

While studying at Princeton, Winters received the university's 2022 Academy of American Poets University & College Prize for the poem "It's Not That I'm Angry".

Winters is founder and editor-in-chief of Half Mystic Press. In 2023, she co-founded the online literary magazine Kopi Break. Her poems have appeared in Poetry Northwest, The Drift, and Passages North.

Her scholarly article "Queering Poetics: The Impact of Poetry on LGBT+ Identity in Singaporean Adolescents" was published in the Journal of Homosexuality.

== Selected works ==
=== Poetry collections ===
- Portrait of My Body as a Crime I'm Still Committing. Button Poetry, 2019; reissued 2024. ISBN 9781733881609.
- So, Stranger. Button Poetry, 2022. ISBN 9781638340249.

=== Chapbooks ===
- Heaven or This. 2016.
- poems for the sound of the sky before thunder. Math Paper Press, 2017.

=== Scholarly articles ===
- "Queering Poetics: The Impact of Poetry on LGBT+ Identity in Singaporean Adolescents". Journal of Homosexuality, 67(2), 206–222. 2020. doi:10.1080/00918369.2018.1536415.
