= San Francisco Comedy Condo =

House in San Francisco, CA

- Address: 336 21st Avenue; San Francisco, California; United States
- Location: Richmond District
- Type: Apartment

Construction
- Opened: 1986
- Closed: 2005

The "Comedy Condo", also known as "The 336", had housed San Francisco comedians since 1986. Located at 336 21st Avenue, the space was first rented by Dana Gould, writer on The Simpsons and Alex Reid the head writer of Malcolm in the Middle. Many comedians lived in the three bedroom unit over the next nineteen years including Kevin Kataoka, John Hoogasian, Mark Nadeau, Steve Mazan, Ryan Stout, Mike Spiegelman, Tony Camin, Ron Lynch, Jim Farrell, Barry Lank, Dan Spencer, and Karen Anderson. Lizz Winstead, co-creator of The Daily Show, also lived in the house. Frequent guests included Margaret Cho, Janeane Garofalo, David Cross, Louis C.K., Zachery Bacik and Casey Hardmeyer.

The venue closed in 2005.
