= Gina Brillon =

American comedian

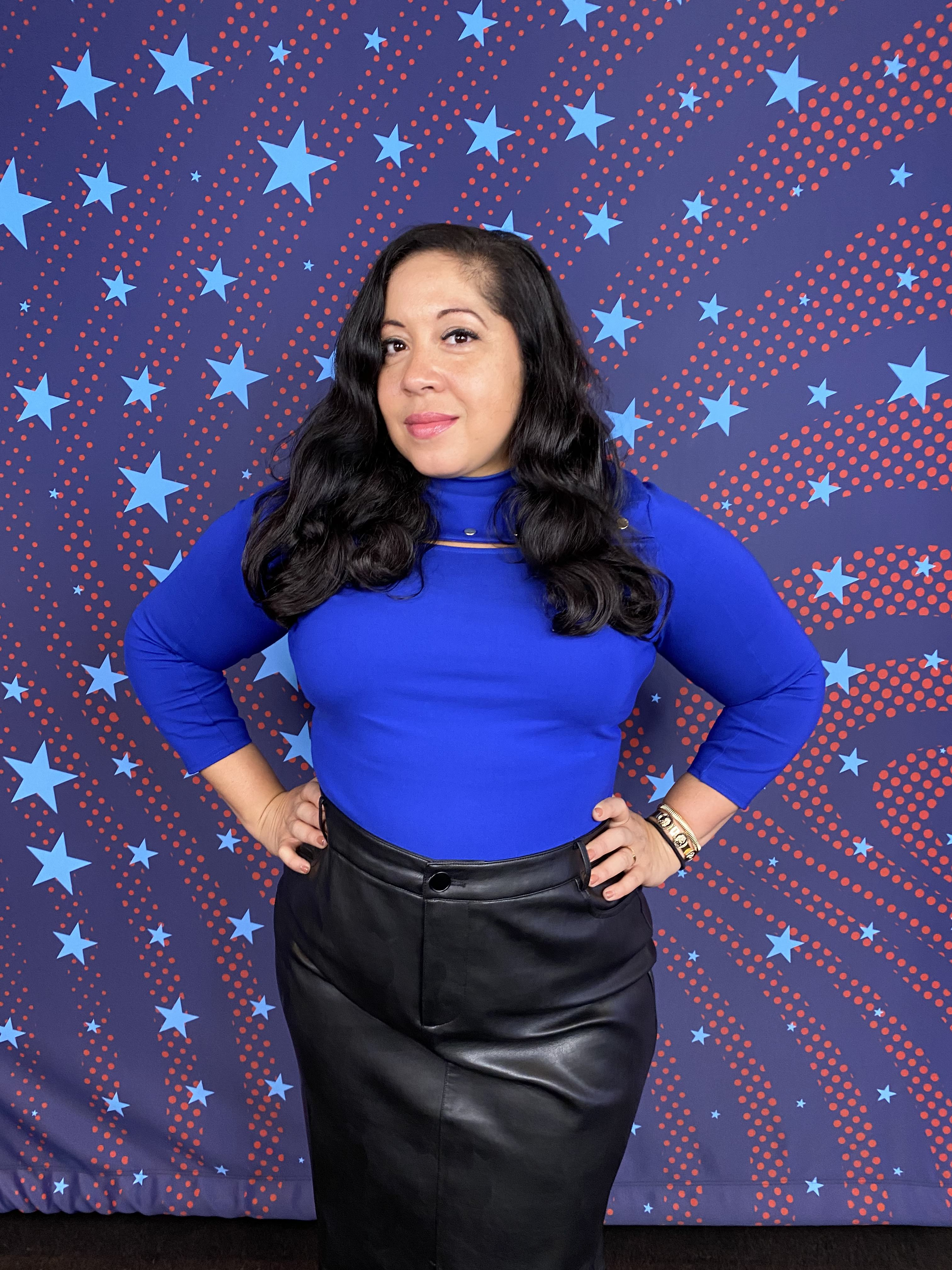
- Citizenship: American
- Occupations: Comedian, Writer, Actress, and Podcaster
- Website: ginabrillon.com

Gina Brillon is an American comedian, writer, actress, and podcaster. She gained national recognition as the first Latina American comedian to reach the final of America’s Got Talent in 2021.

== Early life ==
Her mother entered her and her twin sister, Deborah Lynn, into a stand-up comedy contest when they were 17 years old.

== Career ==
At the start of her career, Brillon performed at various locations, including Carolines, The Comedy Store, and The Laugh Factory at both the Los Angeles and New York City outposts.

In 2012, Brillon became the first Latina winner of NBC's Stand Up for Diversity Showcase. The following year, she was named a "New Face" at the international Just For Laughs Festival in Montreal.

In 2013, she appeared on the TV series Gotham Comedy Live and The View; Following her TV appearances, Brillon was offered a production deal, in 2014, by Gabriel Iglesias for what became her first show, Pacifically Speaking.

Her debut on Easily Offended aired on HBO Latino's Entre Nos franchise in 2019. Her sophomore one-hour special on Prime Video,The Floor is Lava, won a Gracie Award in 2021 and was nominated for an Imagen Award the same year.

Brillon has appeared on television programs including Late Night with Seth Meyers, Jimmy Kimmel Live!, Kevin Can Wait, and The Conners. In 2021, she became the first Latinx comedian to become a finalist on America's Got Talent. Her fifth comedy special, Mind Your Business, debuts on YouTube on February 25, 2025.

== Podcasting ==
Brillon is the co-host and executive producer of The State of: Women, a podcast from Clamor Audio. The show explores gender equity across the United States, highlighting states that excel or falter in achieving equality and offering insights for listeners. She also co-hosted a podcast with Catherine Mendoza named Mess in Progress from 2019 to 2021.

== Awards and recognition ==
- NBC Stand Up for Diversity Showcase: First Latin winner (2012)
- America's Got Talent: First Latin comedian finalist (Season 16, 2021)

Year	Award	Nominated work	Result
2021	Imagen Award	The Floor is Lava	Nominated
2021	Gracie Award	The Floor is Lava	Won

== Notable works ==
- Easily Offended (HBO Latino, 2018)
- The Floor Is Lava (Amazon Prime Video, 2019)
- Acting roles: Kevin Can Wait (CBS), The Conners (ABC)
