= Paul Ogata =

American stand-up comedian and actor (born 1968)

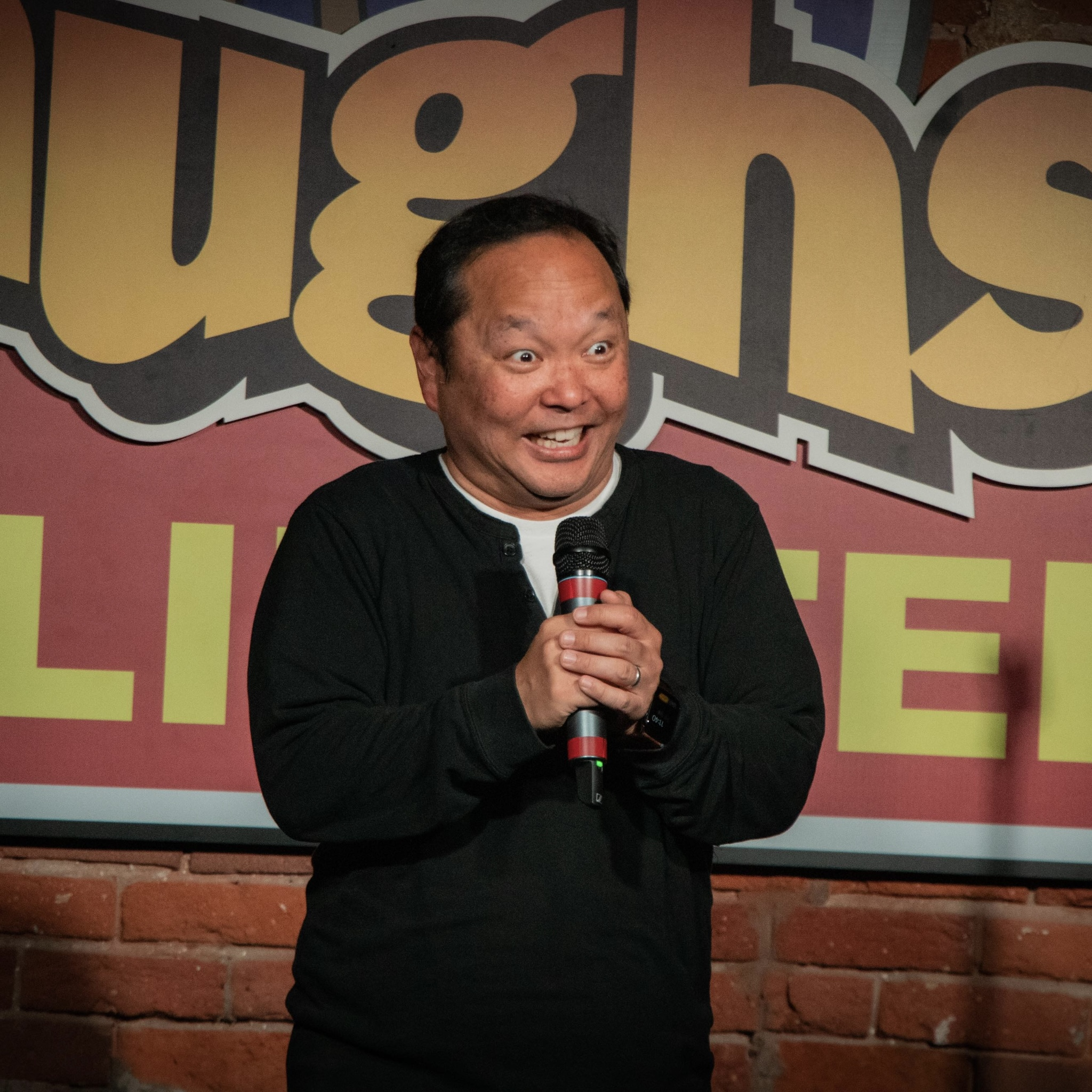
- Born: November 6, 1968 (age 57); Pearl City, Hawaii, U.S.

Comedy career
- Medium: Stand-up comedy, television
- Website: paulogata.com

Paul Ogata is an American stand-up comedian and actor.

== Early life and education ==
Ogata was born and raised in Pearl City, Hawaii, and moved to Los Angeles in 2006 to devote more time to performing stand-up comedy.

Ogata graduated from the University of Hawaii. In college, he briefly studied electrical engineering, a field for which he showed some aptitude as a teen. (Ogata wrote a video game at the age of 13.)

== Career ==
Ogata worked for years as a top-rated morning radio personality in Honolulu on KDDB-FM.

He has appeared on several television shows, most notably Live at Gotham on Comedy Central, the syndicated Comics Unleashed and CBS's The Late Late Show.

As a comedian, in 2004, he was victorious in the TakeOut Comedy Competition, earning the title of "Funniest Asian-American Comedian in the U.S." In 2007, Ogata won the San Francisco International Comedy Competition, joining a list of previous winners which includes Dana Carvey, Sinbad and Jake Johannsen.

Ogata also appeared in the Damon Wayans 2006 drama film Behind the Smile, and starred in the short film Amazing Asian. In 2010, Ogata's debut stand-up comedy album, Paul Ogata Stands Up: Live in Hong Kong, was released on the New Wave Dynamics label. In October 2023, Ogata joined the cast of the Cirque du Soleil show Mad Apple at the New York-New York Hotel & Casino in Las Vegas, Nevada, where he appeared regularly as the featured comedian until the production’s final shows in September 2026.

== Filmography ==
=== Movies ===
- Porndogs: The Adventures of Sadie (2009) as Master Dong
- Behind the Smile (2006) as Karate Man
- Amazing Asian (2004) as The Amazing Asian

=== Television ===
- Celebrity Family Feud, ABC (self)
- Comedy Central Stand Up, Asia!, Comedy Central Asia (featured comedian)
- Pacific Rim Comedy, Showtime (featured comedian)
- Comics Unleashed, syndicated (featured comedian)
- Live at Gotham, Comedy Central (featured comedian)
- The Late Late Show, CBS (featured comedian)
- Asia Street Comedy, AZN Television (featured comedian)
- New Year's Comedy Cure, TBS (featured comedian)
- Friday Night, NBC (featured comedian)

== Discography ==
- Paul Ogata Stands Up: Live in Hong Kong (2010) New Wave Dynamics
