= David Crowe (comedian) =

American comedian

David Crowe is a comedian from Issaquah, Washington. He was the winner of the 1996 San Francisco Stand-up Comedy competition and winner of the 1995 Seattle Stand-up Comedy competition.

He once opened for President Bill Clinton.

== Frank and Funny ==
In 2012, Crowe partnered with Compendium Inc. to release his own line of greeting cards called Frank and Funny. The line has been well reviewed by the greeting card industry and was available in stores across the US including Cost Plus World Markets.

== Works ==
- Crooked Finger, David Crowe Productions (2005)
- Crowe, David (14 January 2020). "Germans Are Arrogant - Full Special". Dry Bar Comedy. youtube.
- Crowe, David (25 November 2020). "Day Spas Will Make You Uptight - Full Special". Dry Bar Comedy. youtube.
- "How to Ride an Ostrich"
