= "Hamburger" Jones =

American writer and comedian

Alonzo "Hamburger" Jones is an American writer and "catchphrase" comedian, best known for his cowboy hat and frequent use of the word "hamburger".

== Career ==
Alonzo is a longtime comedian, Jones first gained national attention following two television appearances on HBO's Def Comedy Jam in the early 90s. Known for his clean comedy routines, Jones became so recognizable for his use of the word "hamburger" at the end of jokes or as a substitution for profanity, often stretching the syllables, that he soon adopted it as his stage name. Although the origins of this shtick have not been well documented, a brief biography by his booking agent claims:

Comedian Hamburger is on a mission to let people know they are not living right. In doing so, Hamburger tries not to use profanity, like gentlemen of the old west who does not swear in front of the ladies. Instead, comedian Alonzo Jones has substituted profanity with one word.....HAMBURGER.

Although he is said to have performed on Showtime at the Apollo, BET's Teen Summit, ComicView, and a few others following his Def Comedy Jam sets, Jones has rarely been seen on television since, except for two appearances on Byron Allen's Comics Unleashed seven years apart, nearly a decade after his last performance on Def Comedy Jam. Despite this, Jones continues to perform stand-up, appearing on tour as recently as May 2019.

== Personal life ==
Over the years, Jones befriended numerous comedians, including Uncle Jimmy Mack, who he claimed had contacted him after beginning a "relationship with the Lord".

== In popular culture ==
- "Came Na Gedown", a track on the Odd Squad album Fadanuf Fa Erybody!!, references Jones by ending a line with "hamburger".
- Artie Lange frequently referred to Jones on his former podcast, The Artie Quitter Podcast.
- During one episode of Opie and Anthony, the hosts dedicated a significant portion of their discussion towards "catchphrase comedians" after recalling Jones' routine.
- Jones' use of "hamburger" was parodied by Kenan Thompson, as fictional comedian David "Beef Jelly" Winfield, in the Saturday Night Live recurring sketch "Kings of Catchphrase Comedy".
- In the Family Guy episode "Scammed Yankees", a soldier uses the "hamburger" phrase while talking to his hostages.
- Hamburger Jones' routine has gone on to inspire Japanese comedian Jun Itoda, one of the characters he portrays being a stereotypical cowboy known as "Hamburg Steak Master" known for unnecessarily shouting "Hamburg!".
