= Sam Tripoli =

American comedian and writer

- Born: 1973 (age 52–53)
- Occupations: Comedian, writer, producer, host, podcaster
- Writing career
- Genres: Comedy, television, podcasts
- Notable works: The Naughty Show; Wild World of Spike; The Tinfoil Hat Podcast; Punch Drunk Sports

Sam Tripoli is an American stand-up comedian, writer, producer and host.

He grew up in Cortland, New York. After graduating high school in 1991, he moved to Las Vegas to attend UNLV. He has appeared on The Joe Rogan Experience eight times.

== Career ==
Tripoli has said that performing and the desire to make people laugh has been in his blood since childhood, when he would tease the other kids at his school. He began doing stand-up comedy on a dare. He was soon performing in Las Vegas casinos with Mutiny, an improv troupe he co-founded, as well as hosting weekly shows on the strip.

In 2000, Tripoli moved to Los Angeles. His break came while working the door at The Comedy Store. Owner Mitzi Shore put together a Middle Eastern themed show called "Arabian Knights", and Tripoli's Armenian heritage got him on the bill. He was one of two comedians at The Comedy Store to do their first set as a paid regular in The Main Room – the other was Roseanne Barr.

In 2006, friend and comedian Steve Byrne brought him along to an audition for Spike TV, which resulted in Tripoli getting cast as a co-host on the network's Wild World of Spike.

Tripoli was chosen as a finalist in 2008's "Who Wants to be Howard Stern" contest, and his demo was played on-air.

Tripoli currently performs throughout Los Angeles. "Crimefighter" was the title of his debut comedy album and a frequent theme in his act. He has toured as part of The Monsters of Comedy, Rock Stars of Comedy, and a USO Tour of Afghanistan organized by Vince Vaughn.

Tripoli created The Naughty Show, which is a live comedy variety show, and a weekly podcast on the DEATHSQUAD network. Both shows incorporate comedians, adult film stars, characters and videos. He was also a frequent guest on The Joe Rogan Experience and Ice House Chronicles.

In 2012, Tripoli and comedians Ari Shaffir and Jayson Thibault launched "Punch-Drunk", a sports radio show, on the Toadhop Network. In 2017, Tripoli released a double comedy album, "The Diabolical".

Since 2018 Tripoli has co-hosted "Tin Foil Hat", a podcast and YouTube show with Xavier "XG" Guerrero.

== Selected appearances ==
- 2022 Quite Frankly Podcast - Guest Appearance
- 2019 Zero F**ks: Sam Tripoli Live From The Viper Room Stand Up Special
- 2019 Armogeddon: Sam Tripoli Live From The Viper Room Stand Up Special
- 2019 This Past Weekend with Theo Von Podcast
- 2018 Your Mom's House Podcast
- 2017 The Fighter and the Kid Podcast
- 2017 Your Mom's House Podcast
- 2017 TigerBelly Podcast
- Co-Creator of Tin Foil Hat Podcast examining corruption and the news.
- 2012-Present Punch-Drunk – Co-creator and Co-host
- 2011-Present The Naughty Show – Creator and Host
- 2012 Comedy Film Nerds
- 2011-Present The Joe Rogan Experience – Recurring Guest
- 2011-Present The Ice House Chronicles – Recurring Guest
- 2010 Comics Unleashed
- 2010 Man Up, Stand-Up
- 2009 Surviving the Holidays with Lewis Black
- 2009 Live Nude Comedy
- 2009 Comedy.TV
- 2008 Comics Without Borders
- 2007 Wild World of Spike – Host
- 2007 The Late Late Show with Craig Ferguson
- 2005 Party @ the Palms
- 2004 The Late Late Show with Craig Kilborn
- 2004 Premium Blend
