= Wild World =

Wild World may refer to:

- "Wild World" (song), a 1970 song by Cat Stevens
- Wild World (Bastille album), 2016
- Wild World (Kip Moore album), 2020
- Animal Crossing: Wild World, a 2005 life-simulation video game for the Nintendo DS
- Wild World, a former name for the Six Flags America amusement park in Woodmore, Maryland

== See also ==
- "Bluey's Wild World", an attraction at Conservation Station at Disney's Animal Kingdom
- WILD World Championship, a U.S. women's wrestling promotion
- Wild World of Spike, a 2007 TV series
