= Marc Yaffee =

Native American comedian

- Born: January 15, 1961 (age 65); Los Angeles, CA
- Notable work: Pow Wow Comedy Jam, Crossing the Line, Goin' Native

Comedy career
- Years active: 1999–present
- Medium: Stand-up comedian, actor, podcast host
- Genres: Situational comedy, Clean humor, Native American comedy, Generational comedy
- Website: laughwithmarc.com

Marc Yaffee (born January 15, 1961) is a Native American comedian, writer, actor, and podcast host. Marc began doing stand-up comedy in 1999 after attending a comedy workshop at Laughs Unlimited Comedy Club in Sacramento, CA. Since then, he has performed in 43 states and 11 countries.

== Early life ==
Marc Yaffee was born in East Los Angeles, California. Marc was adopted at birth by a Mexican American mother (Lucina Yaffee, née Chavira) and a Jewish father (Asher 'Bud' Yaffee). Only when he was contacted by his birth mother, decades later at the age of 25, did he learn that his biological father was of Mexican Navajo Indigenous descent. Marc was raised in the East San Fernando Valley with an adopted sister, Patty. He attended St. Genevieve Elementary and High School before going on to get a degree in International Relations at the University of San Diego.

== Career ==
=== Comedy solo work ===
Marc Yaffee began his comedy career in his mid 30s. Yaffee had toured in 43 states and 11 countries that span four continents. As well as performing on cruise ships where he seems to be using racial stereotypes as material. These areas including the Persian Gulf, Germany, Korea and Japan and the Caribbean. Marc has appeared on PBS, FNX, The Latino Laugh Festival, and Showtime's "Goin’ Native". Marc's comedy special "Marc My Words" (2018) airs on NativeFlix.com. Marc appeared on the Showtime special, Goin' Native: The American Indian Comedy Slam, as well on the PBS special, Crossing the Line, SiTV's The Latino Laugh Festival, and Comics Unleashed with Byron Allen. Marc is also a former writer for George Carlin's Laugh.com and has toured 5 times overseas entertaining U.S. troops in Asia, Europe and the Middle East.

His club credits include Catch A Rising Star, The Ice House, The Laugh Factory, Comedy Underground, and The Improv Comedy Club.

=== "Pow Wow Comedy Jam" and "Boomerang Baby Boomer Comedy Bash" ===
A founding member of the Pow Wow Comedy Jam which began in 2004, Marc has toured with fellow Native American comedians Vaughn Eaglebear and Howie Miller. The trio are a frequent attraction at casino shows, tribal events and VIP Player parties. Marc is a proponent of supporting the promotion of Indian gaming institutions and tribal tourism. The trio has been performing together since 2005 on what they call "The Trail of Laughs" and were honored as National Indian Gaming Association's Entertainers of the Year. Their CD, "Phase 3, Live at Coeur D'Alene Casino" was named North American Indigenous Image Awards Comedy CD of the Year.

Marc is the founder of, and a co-star in, the Boomerang Baby Boomer Comedy Bash with Kat Simmons and David Gee, where he shares stories, jokes and observations on growing up as a part of the Baby-Boomer-generation. Yaffee also tours with Hawaiian-born comedian, Adam Stone, a regular at the Laugh Factory in Reno and Las Vegas, Nevada and has also been heard on the nationally syndicated Bob & Tom Show.

=== Acting ===
Yaffee was recruited for and shot a TV pilot where he played a comedian teaching citizenship to new immigrants. It never went to air. The show's cast also includes Gerry Bednob (Mooj from The 40-Year-Old Virgin), and Steven Michael Quezada (Agent Gomez from Breaking Bad). The show focused on Marc's role as a comedian turned citizenship instructor and the unique relationships he develops with his immigrant students. Yaffee also co-starred in the premiere episode of the new stand-up series, "First Nations Comedy Experience" for the FNX (First Nations Experience Network).

=== "How Does that Happen" Podcast ===
Marc Yaffee is the producer and host of a Podcast which began airing in 2019 called "How Does that Happen". The Podcast spotlights interviews with individuals who hold world records of an unusual nature.

=== Filmography ===
- 2002 - Galavision Network's "Que Locos!"
- 2005 - SiTV's "Funny is Funny"
- 2005 - "The Latino Laugh Festival"
- 2007 - "Comics Unleashed with Byron Allen"
- 2010 - Showtime's "Goin' Native: The American Indian Comedy Slam"
- 2012 - PBS's "Crossing the Line"

=== Discography ===
- 2013 - Chucklelicious
- 2013 - Phase 3, Live at Coeur D'Alene Casino
- 2018 - Marc My Words
- 2020 - Mid Laugh Crisis w/ DryBar Comedy
- 2024 - Laffy Yaffee
- 2024 - Raising the Bar w/ DryBar Comedy

== Awards and recognition ==
- 2012 - Winner, Ventura Comedy Festival, Funniest Person Contest.
- 2012 - North American Indigenous Image Awards Comedy CD of the Year (with Powwow Comedy Jam).
- 2010 - National Indian Gaming Association Entertainer of the Year (with Powwow Comedy Jam).
