= Darren Carter (disambiguation) =

Darren Carter may refer to:

- Darren Carter (born 1983), English footballer
- Darren Carter (comedian), American actor and stand-up comedian
- Darren Carter (rugby league) (born 1972), professional rugby league footballer
