= Erik Myers =

American comedian (1980–2021)

- Born: February 29, 1980; Kissimmee, Florida, U.S.
- Died: February 24, 2021 (aged 40); Amarillo, Texas, U.S.
- Education: Towson University
- Notable work: Dopeless Romantic

Comedy career
- Years active: 1998–2021
- Medium: Stand-up comedy

Erik Myers (February 29, 1980 – February 25, 2021) was an American comedian, actor and writer.

== Early life ==
Myers was born in February 1980. He grew up in Columbia, Maryland, and began his comedy career at the age of 18 at Winchester's Pub in Baltimore. In 2005, he won the "Funniest Person in Baltimore" contest. Myers later moved to Florida where he was named the state's Funniest Comedian in 2011.

== Career ==
Myers was based in Los Angeles, California, where he was a paid regular at The Comedy Store in Hollywood. He has appeared on Gotham City Live, Laughs on FOX, and performed his one-hour special Dopeless Romantic for Hulu. He appeared during Andrew Dice Clay Presents the Blue Show on Showtime, and Comics Unleashed with Byron Allen. Myers was the co-creator of the animated cartoon Court Ordered, loosely based on his life, with characters voiced by notable comedians.

== Death ==
Erik Myers died on February 24, 2021, aged 40, after being struck by a van near Amarillo, Texas.
