= Harris Stanton =

American comedian (born 1978)

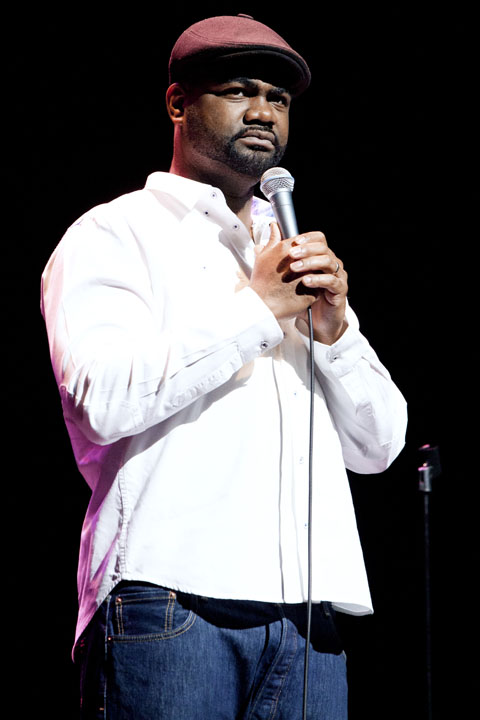
- Born: 1978 (age 47–48); South Carolina, U.S.
- Education: Spartanburg Methodist College
- Occupation: Comedian
- Children: 2
- Relatives: Leroy Stanton (uncle}

Harris Stanton (born 1978) is an American comedian based in Brooklyn, New York. Before entering comedy, Stanton was a Major League Baseball draft pick. He tours nationally and internationally including appearances on European television. Stanton appeared in the opening act lineup for the Tracy Morgan "Turn It Funny" tour when the vehicle carrying Morgan, Ardie Fuqua, James McNair, and Jeff Millea was involved in a fatal car crash in June 2014.

== Career ==
Harris Stanton attended Spartanburg Methodist College in Spartanburg, South Carolina. In 1996, he was drafted by the Chicago Cubs in the 52nd round of the Major League Baseball (MLB) June Amateur Draft.

He decided to pursue comedy leading to a decade-long career. Stanton has worked with comedy clubs such as Carolines on Broadway, Gotham Comedy Club, Stand-up New York, The Improv, as well universities such as M.I.T. He has also been featured on BET's Comic View, Premium Blend and Comics Unleashed and as a sketch character on Saturday Night Live. Stanton's jokes include topics such as aggressive New Yorkers, scary bodegas, and working security with only a flashlight and a pencil ("what am I supposed to do, sketch a weapon?"). He recorded a comedy DVD with Patrice O'Neal. He also toured with comedian Tracy Morgan for the "Turn it Funny" comedy tour.

== Crash ==
Harris Stanton was a member of the comedy troupe touring with actor Tracy Morgan that resulted in a fatal crash on the New Jersey Turnpike. The comedy troupe's limo bus was struck from behind and demolished when a Walmart semi-trailer truck failed to slow for traffic. Stanton was conscious the entire time of accident and was able to provide a detailed account of the crash. The accident resulted in the death of James McNair and the critical injuries of Morgan, Fuqua, and Millea. Stanton was treated and released from the hospital for a broken wrist and bruised ankle.

== Filmography ==
- Holla If I Kill You (2003)
- Gotham Comedy Live (2012)
- Damon (2006)
- Naive Innocence (2017)
