= Deryk Shockley =

American soccer player

Personal information
- Date of birth: August 6, 1976 (age 50)
- Position: Midfielder

Youth career
- FC Richmond
- Strikers

College career
Years	Team	Apps	(Gls)
- Spartanburg Methodist College

Senior career*
Years	Team	Apps	(Gls)
- Baltimore Bays (indoor)
1997–1998	Richmond Kickers	13	(0)
1998–2000	Roanoke Wrath		(5)
2001	Wilmington Hammerheads	12	(0)

International career
1993	United States U17	3	(0)
- * Club domestic league appearances and goals

Deryk Shockley (born August 6, 1976) is a former American soccer player who played for the Richmond Kickers in the A-League.

== Career statistics ==
=== Club ===
Club	Season	League			Cup		Continental		Other		Total	
Club	Season	Division	Apps	Goals	Apps	Goals	Apps	Goals	Apps	Goals	Apps	Goals
Richmond Kickers	1997	A-League	9	0	0	0	–		0	0	9	0
Richmond Kickers	1998	A-League	4	0	0	0	–		0	0	4	0
Richmond Kickers	Total		13	0	0	0	0	0	0	0	13	0
Wilmington Hammerheads	2001	USISL D-3 Pro League	12	0	0	0	–		0	0	12	0
Career total			25	0	0	0	0	0	0	0	25	0
