= The Byron Allen Show =

American syndicated late-night talk show

- Genre: Talk show
- Presented by: Byron Allen
- Country of origin: United States
- Original language: English

Production
- Running time: 60 minutes (1989–1992); 30 minutes (1992)
- Production company: BYCA Productions

Original release
- Network: Syndication
- Release: September 9, 1989 – 1992

The Byron Allen Show is an American first-run syndicated late-night talk show hosted by comedian Byron Allen. The series premiered on September 9, 1989, as a weekly hour-long program produced by BYCA Productions in association with Allbritton Television Productions and distributed by Genesis Entertainment. Allen's company, BYCA Television Distribution, assumed distribution in 1991, and the program was converted into a half-hour weeknight series in 1992.

== History ==
Allen had previously appeared as a co-host and reporter on NBC's Real People. In January 1989, Genesis Entertainment announced that it would distribute a weekly late-night talk show hosted by Allen. The series debuted on September 9, 1989, and was generally scheduled in weekend late-night time slots.

The program combined an opening monologue, celebrity interviews, comedy and musical performances. By its second season, it had been cleared on more than 170 stations, covering approximately 96 percent of the United States.

In 1991, Allen established BYCA Television Distribution, which took over distribution of the series from Genesis Entertainment. In December of that year, BYCA announced that the program would be expanded from a weekly hour-long show into a half-hour series airing five nights a week beginning in fall 1992. The nightly version was subsequently launched, but the series ended in 1992.

== Legacy ==
The Byron Allen Show marked Allen's first effort to produce and, through BYCA Television Distribution, distribute his own television programming. After the series ended and BYCA encountered financial difficulties, Allen founded CF Entertainment in 1993. CF Entertainment, later renamed Entertainment Studios, became the foundation of Allen Media Group. Allen subsequently expanded the business from low-cost syndicated television programming into television stations, cable networks, film distribution and digital media.
