= Cash Levy =

American comedian, author, actor and podcaster

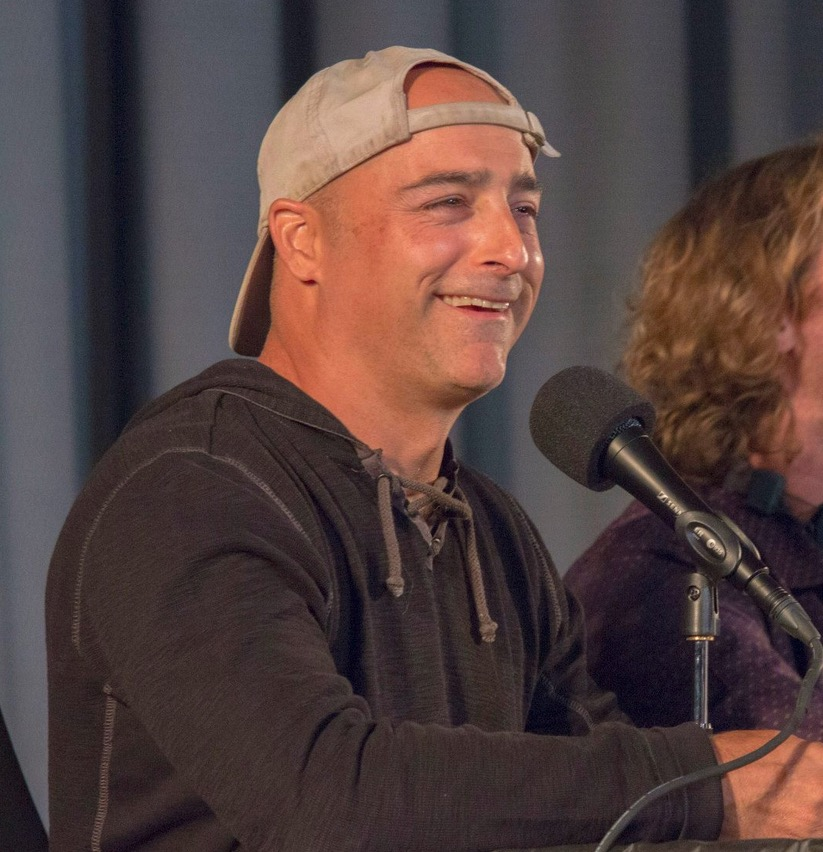
- Cash Levy at a live taping of Cashing in with T.J. Miller in May 2014
- Born: St. Louis, Missouri
- Occupations: Actor, comedian, podcaster, author
- Years active: 2007–present
- Website: Official website

Cassius "Cash" Levy is an American stand-up comedian, author, actor and podcaster.

== Early life ==
Cash was born in St. Louis, Missouri, and grew up in Palo Alto, California. He currently resides in Los Angeles, California, with his wife and two children.

== Professional career ==
Cash works primarily as a stand up comedian. Cash created the improvised comedy podcast, "Cashing in with T.J. Miller" which he hosts with fellow comedian T.J. Miller. Cash was a contributing writer for the 2015 and 2016 Critics Choice Awards where he wrote jokes and sketches for the broadcast. Cash is known for his eponymous "Cash Phrases", a growing list of comical sayings he's coined on his podcast.

== Television credits ==
- @Midnight
- The Late Late Show with Craig Ferguson
- Comedy Central's Premium Blend
- Comics Unleashed with Byron Allen

== Comedy recordings ==
In 2012, he performed a one-hour stand-up special, "Cash Levy: Crowd Control" that aired on AXS TV. He'd previously released a comedy album entitled "Extemporaneous", which is an hour of completely improvised material.
