= Derrick Cameron =

American stand-up comedian

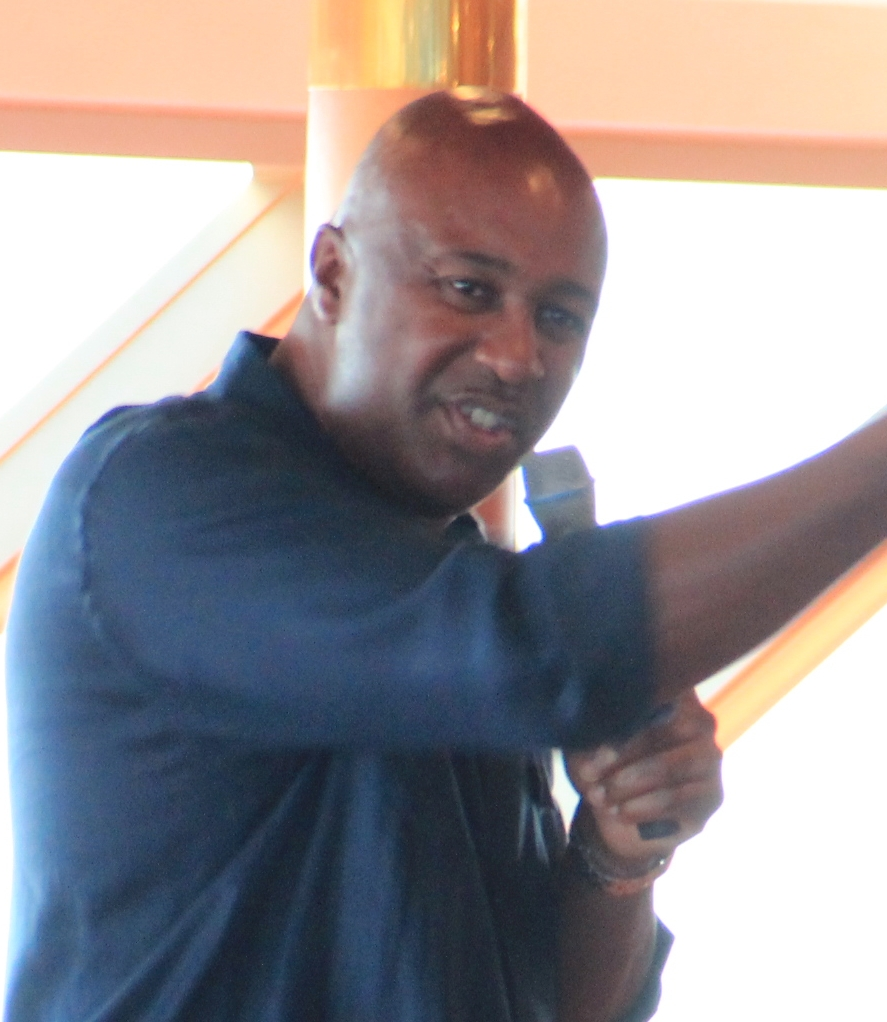
Cameron in 2013

Derrick Cameron is an American stand-up comedian who has performed on The Tonight Show with Jay Leno, Comedy Central, and Comics Unleashed. He has appeared on The Bob & Tom Show and has performed in concert with Al Green and Blue Öyster Cult. Cameron also does stand-up comedy shows on Princess Cruises and Royal Caribbean International cruise ships such as Sapphire Princess, Voyager of the Seas, Anthem of the Seas, and Mariner of the Seas.

Prior to starting in comedy, Cameron was a carpet salesman. In 1987, he won the Northern California Comedy Competition.
