= Comics Unleashed =

American TV late-night comedy TV series

- Also known as: Comics Unleashed with Byron Allen
- Created by: Byron Allen
- Presented by: Byron Allen
- Narrated by: John Cramer
- Country of origin: United States
- Original language: English
- No. of episodes: 233 (2006–2016); 132 (2025–present)

Production
- Executive producers: Byron Allen; Carolyn Folks
- Camera setup: Multi-camera, videotape
- Running time: 30 minutes
- Production company: Allen Media Group

Original release
- Network: Syndicated
- Release: September 2006 – 2016
- Network: CBS
- Release: September 18, 2023 – January 16, 2024
- Release: September 23, 2025 – present

Related
- Funny You Should Ask

Comics Unleashed with Byron Allen is an American half-hour late-night television comedy, produced by Allen Media Group (formerly Entertainment Studios, Inc.), and hosted by Byron Allen. The show's announcer is John Cramer, with DJ Cobra or DJ A-One providing music support.

The panel show originally ran from 2006 to 2016 in syndication, in addition to CBS from mid-September 2023 until mid-January 2024 to fill the former time slot of The Late Late Show with James Corden, before its permanent replacement After Midnight could begin. It returned to the same time slot on CBS, during late-night September 22, 2025 (early morning September 23), due to After Midnight being cancelled.

Beginning May 22, 2026, Comics Unleashed moved to the 11:35 p.m. time slot vacated by the cancellation of The Late Show with Stephen Colbert. CBS sold the time slot to Byron Allen's AMG for $15 million via a time buy agreement. The 12:37 AM slot was taken by another Allen Media property, the game show Funny You Should Ask, hosted by Jon Kelley.

== Format and guests ==
Each episode begins with Allen delivering a short monologue, after which he introduces the night's DJ and the panel of four comedians. Allen sets each comedian up with a prescribed, usually generic premise, at which point the comic delivers a monologue from their stand-up routine. The monologues by different comedians seldom tie into each other, but the structure of the show puts the monologues in the loose framework of a panel discussion talk show.

Several episodes of the series in first-run featured an all-Black panel under the title Comics Unleashed: Hot Chocolate, though they were eventually presented as regular episodes in subsequent airings.

Allen has described Comics Unleashed as his passion project. He said he was inspired to launch the show in honor and memory of Johnny Carson, who had died in 2005. Allen received his first major break as a comedian on The Tonight Show during Carson's tenure. He purposely advised his writers and comedians who appear on the program to avoid topical or political content. This had the dual effect of keeping the program evergreen (allowing for more frequent reruns), and maintaining the favor of advertisers who are averse to political content.

Notable or frequent comics and actors appearing have included: Jon Lovitz, Sinbad, Joe DeVito, Tiffany Haddish, Roy Wood Jr., Harland Williams, Alonzo Bodden, Adam Carolla, Carol Leifer, Finesse Mitchell, Godfrey, Mario Joyner, Earthquake, Loni Love, Judy Tenuta, Sheryl Underwood, Rita Rudner, Bill Engvall, Jay Mohr, Jamie Kennedy, Caroline Rhea, Jeff Dye, Helen Hong, Brad Williams, Carlos Alazraqui, Tammy Pescatelli, Pauly Shore, Bruce Bruce, Billy Gardell, Tommy Davidson, Kevin Hart, Dane Cook, Aries Spears, Don Curry, Greg Hahn, Lavell Crawford, Chelsea Handler, John Pinette, Margaret Cho, George Wallace, Sommore, Cedric the Entertainer, Maria Bamford, Howie Mandel, Darren Carter, Bob Marley, Buddy Lewis, Lisa Alvarado, Melinda Hill, Kathleen Madigan, Steve Treviño, Paul Ogata, "Hamburger" Jones, Jeff Richards, Don Friesen, Marc Yaffee, Jodi Miller, Erik Myers, Rodney Perry, Derrick Cameron, Tom Dreesen, James P. Connolly, Edwin San Juan, Josh Blue, Ritch Shydner, Sam Tripoli, The Greg Wilson, Eddie Gossling, Gabriel Iglesias, Sue Costello, Matt Knudsen, Iliza Shlesinger, Lisa Landry, Christopher "Kid" Reid, Pablo Francisco, Sunda Croonquist, Kristin Key, Cash Levy, Reese Waters, Ian Harvie, Harris Stanton, Dwayne Perkins, David A. Arnold, Monique Marvez, David Brenner, Wayne Brady, Larry Miller, Jeff Ross, Robert Wuhl and Dom Irrera, among others.

Veteran comedian Jimmie Walker was honored during an episode for his contribution to Byron Allen's career, as well as the impact he had on David Letterman and Jay Leno. Another guest of the show, Norm Macdonald said "you couldn't be more leashed" of the series and its format, on his Netflix show Norm Macdonald Has a Show. He claimed the producers of Comics Unleashed subjected his jokes to "six different levels" of scrutiny.

== History and production ==
First-run weekly episodes were originally produced from 2006–07, with repeats airing in some markets, generally in the very late-night to overnight hours under arrangements made for the various series of Entertainment Studios Networks. Some notable carriers included CBS Television Stations, which scheduled it as a lead-out for The Late Late Show on CBS owned-and-operated stations. Back-to-back episodes also aired in prime time on MyNetworkTV before it became a programming service. The program continued to air on broadcast syndication, despite not producing any new episodes after its original 2006–2007 run, until new episodes were produced for the 2014–2015 season. The final new episodes were produced in 2016, before production resumed for the 2025–2026 season on CBS.

In September 2023, CBS announced that it would air back-to-back episodes of Comics Unleashed on its late-night lineup beginning September 18, following The Late Show with Stephen Colbert. The program served as a temporary replacement for The Late Late Show, which had ended following the series finale of The Late Late Show with James Corden. Until the premiere of its replacement in January 2024, After Midnight had been delayed due to the 2023 Hollywood labor disputes. The announcement led to Allen being called a "union-busting rich guy" for providing CBS with content to use during the strike.

Roughly half of the series featured previously unaired first-run episodes. Allen's company provided the program under a time-buy arrangement where it purchased the time slot from CBS, and then aired the show and sold commercial time to advertisers.

On May 27, 2025, CBS announced that it would again air back-to-back episodes of Comics Unleashed on its late-night lineup beginning September 22. It was a replacement for After Midnight, which was cancelled due to host Taylor Tomlinson resigning from the program to focus on stand-up comedy and other projects. Reruns of After Midnight continued until September 19. The program was once again part of a time-buy arrangement. Prior to the announcement, CBS had indicated it might discontinue airing network programming in that time slot entirely.

The purchase agreement was announced shortly before a settlement in Allen's long-running lawsuit against McDonald's was announced, which included McDonald's accepting a mandatory purchase of airtime on Allen's programs.

Allen produced 132 new half-hour episodes of Comics Unleashed for the 2025–2026 season, which aired back-to-back with previously aired episodes. Four new episodes aired each week with a new episode being repeated on Fridays. All of the week's new episodes are taped in a single taping session, taking advantage of the non-topical nature of the show's format, to save costs.

CBS later announced that it was not renewing the show's lead-in, The Late Show with Stephen Colbert, when Stephen Colbert's contract expired in May 2026. Allen made a public overture to CBS to move Comics Unleashed to the earlier time slot, which CBS ultimately agreed to do. Allen's time-buy agreement with CBS for the 11:35 p.m. and 12:37 a.m. slots runs for one season, with CBS stating that it had considered reruns and surrendering the time slot to its network affiliates, before accepting Allen's offer as a temporary measure to buy the network time to decide what it wants to do with the daypart long-term.

On September 29, 2026, CBS aired a two-hour 20th anniversary special about the series during prime time. According to sources familiar with the agreement, the special was negotiated as part of Allen's overall time-buy agreement with CBS, and was not requested by the network's entertainment division.

== Reception ==
The announcement that Comics Unleashed would replace The Late Show with Stephen Colbert at 11:35 p.m. on CBS generated widespread criticism from television critics, media writers and viewers, many of whom viewed the move as emblematic of the declining state of American network late-night television.

Writing for CNN, Liam Reilly described the move as "a remarkable comedown for CBS late night" following the end of The Late Show franchise. The Hollywood Reporter wrote that the arrangement reflected CBS's uncertainty about the future of the late-night format, noting that the network was "developing other ideas" for the time slot after the Byron Allen agreement concluded.

Writers noted the contrast between The Late Show, which had featured topical political comedy and celebrity interviews, and Comics Unleashed, whose format intentionally avoids political material in favor of evergreen stand-up routines. In the Los Angeles Times, Stephen Battaglio wrote that Allen's approach was based on avoiding politics and controversy in order to keep the program "evergreen" and more attractive to advertisers.

Several publications characterized the move as a cost-cutting measure by CBS amid broader retrenchment in network late-night programming.

The decision also prompted discussion regarding the use of time buy agreements during network late-night television, as Allen Media Group purchased the 11:35 p.m. and 12:37 a.m. time slots from CBS for the 2026–27 television season. Some commentators compared the arrangement to syndicated and brokered late-night programming practices more common in earlier decades of American television.

Critic Andrew Lawrence of The Guardian wrote that Comics Unleashed "feels less like a late-night show than an infomercial for one."

== Ratings ==
The September 2025 return of Comics Unleashed to CBS at 12:37 a.m. drew modest ratings compared to other late-night network programs, though it improved upon some of the network's overnight repeat programming in the time slot.

Following its move to 11:35 p.m. in May 2026, the program experienced a significant increase in total viewership due to the earlier time slot and larger lead-in audience from local news broadcasts. However, ratings which estimated 878,000 viewers for the show's premiere at 11:35 p.m. were substantially below those historically achieved by The Late Show with Stephen Colbert in the same time period, with 87% fewer viewers than watched Colbert's finale and 59% down from Colbert's season average of 2.15 million viewers. It has typically performed the best on Friday nights, when its competition is running repeats.

Trade publications reported that CBS viewed the arrangement as a temporary, lower-cost programming solution while the network evaluated long-term plans for the late-night daypart.

CBS defended its late-night move, with a network spokesperson saying "With this ‘time buy’ model, we have shifted an hour that was losing roughly $40 million annually to $15 million in profit — a $55 million swing."
