= Spartanburg Methodist College =

Private college in Spartanburg, South Carolina, US

- Former names: Textile Industrial Institute (1911-1942); Spartanburg Junior College (1942-1974)
- Motto: Deus Providet (Latin)
- Motto in English: "God provides"
- Type: Private college
- Established: 1911; 115 years ago
- Founder: David English Camak
- Accreditation: SACS
- Religious affiliation: United Methodist Church
- Academic affiliations: CIC; IAMSCU
- Endowment: $27.6 million (2025)
- President: William Scott Cochran
- Faculty: 49 (full-time)
- Students: 1,220 (2025)
- Location: Saxon (Spartanburg address), South Carolina, United States; 34°57′13″N 81°58′16″W
- Campus: metropolitan, 110-acre (45 ha) campus
- Colors: Blue & white
- Nickname: Pioneers
- Sporting affiliations: NAIA - AAC
- Mascot: Big Blue
- Website: www.smcsc.edu
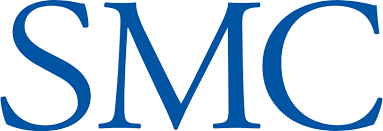

Spartanburg Methodist College (SMC) is a private college in Saxon, South Carolina, United States, with a Spartanburg postal address. The college is affiliated with the United Methodist Church and enrolled 1,220 students for the 2025 fall semester.

== History ==
Spartanburg Methodist College was founded as the Textile Industrial Institute (TII) by David English Camak, who was moved by the challenges southern cotton textile workers faced. An elementary and secondary school were established in a vacant house near Duncan Memorial Methodist Episcopal Church. With support from Walter S. Montgomery, president of Spartan Mill, the school steadily grew and eventually became a mission of the South Carolina Conference of the Methodist Episcopal Church.

In 1913, the college acquired its present campus. It began constructing Charles P. Hammond Hall, which still serves as a residence hall.

Although the work and study schedules helped students attend the Textile Industrial Institute, the school needed additional income. The TII board of trustees recruited members from the South Carolina Methodist conferences, allowed the land to be sold, and paid off the debts to create new funds for the project. The Model Mill opened in 1919, allowing TII to combine education and work as Camak had envisioned. The Model Mill produced weaves, dyed and bleached materials, enhanced the threads to make them more robust, and refined the art of depth in precise dying. The success of the Model Mill was short-lived. In 1921, the mill employed only TII students, but issues with financing led to the closure of the Model Mill in 1922. Students once again returned to off-campus jobs to support them while enrolled at TII.

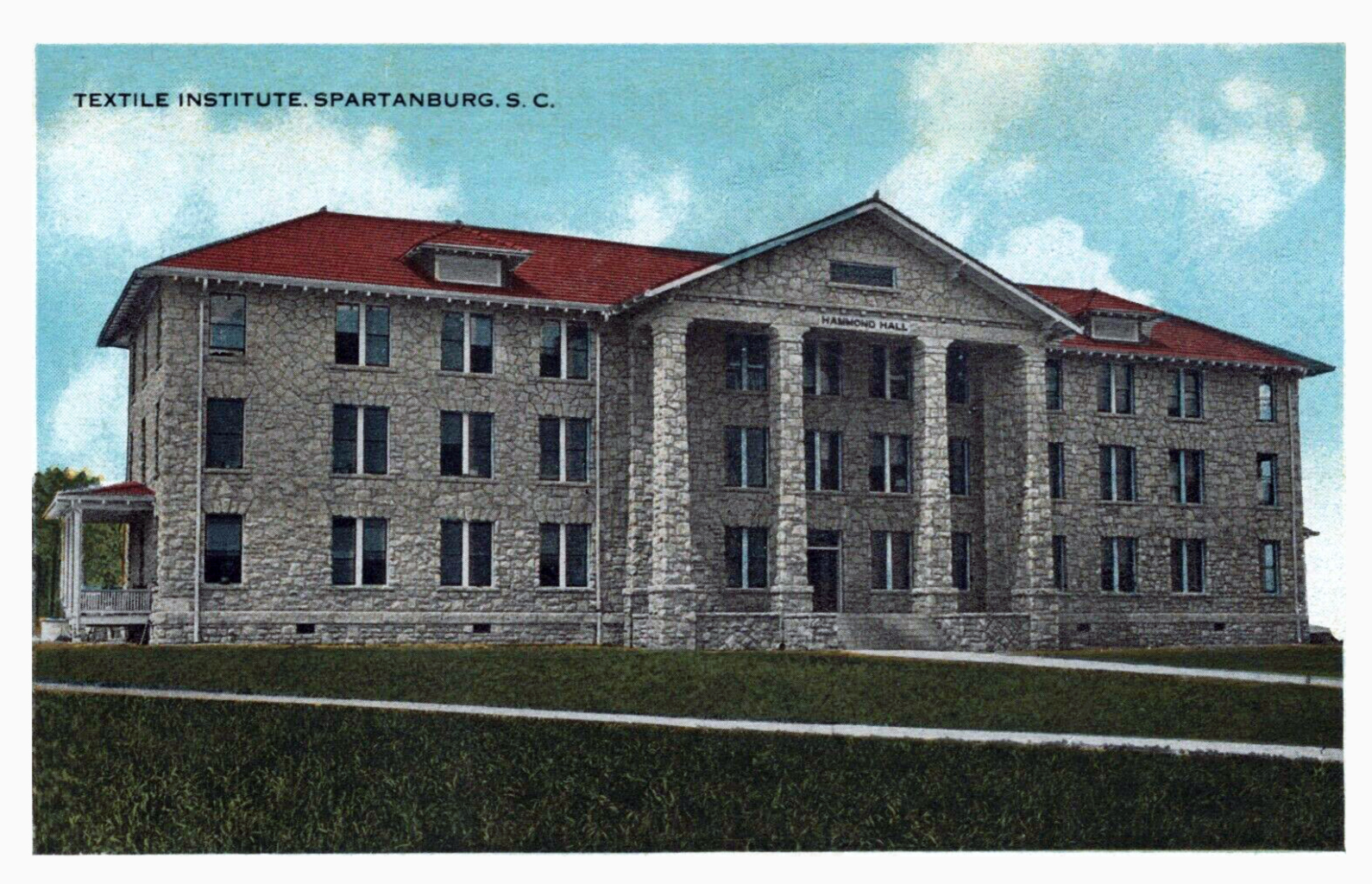
Hammond Hall, the first building on the campus, was constructed by students in 1913.

By 1927, TII expanded its offerings to include the first two years of college-level education. After initially providing high school-level courses for young adults working in the area's textile mills, TII expanded its curriculum in 1927 to offer two years of college-level work, granting associate degrees in liberal arts. That allowed graduates to transfer to senior-level colleges or enter the workforce.

The industrial mill jobs on campus created declines in health due to working in harsh conditions. Many students worked on campus in the kitchen, laundry, or on the farm; others worked in town. The trustees soon realized that increased enrollment required additional housing. Eliza Attleton Judd, wife of a local bank president, was interested in helping women access education and offered a solution to the school's housing problem by donating money to create a building for girls on campus. The trustees believed that completing Hammond Hall was a more urgent priority than building a dormitory for girls. Judd continued to support TII with a gift of timberland. In 1928, a decade after her death, the Textile Industrial Institute built Judd Hall, a women's dormitory, in her honor.

In 1940, TII discontinued its high school classes, and, in 1942, the institution's name was changed to Spartanburg Junior College. In 1974, its name was changed to Spartanburg Methodist College.

For decades, Spartanburg Methodist College served as a two-year junior college. In 2019, Spartanburg Methodist College further expanded its academic offerings by introducing bachelor's degree programs.

=== Presidents ===
College presidents
President	Years served
David English Camak	1911-1923
Rembert B. Burgess	1923-1962
Lester Kingman	1963-1970
James S. Barrett	1970-1976
George D. Fields, Jr.	1976-1997
Charles Porter Teague	1997-2009
Colleen Perry Keith	2009-2015
William Scott Cochran	2015-present

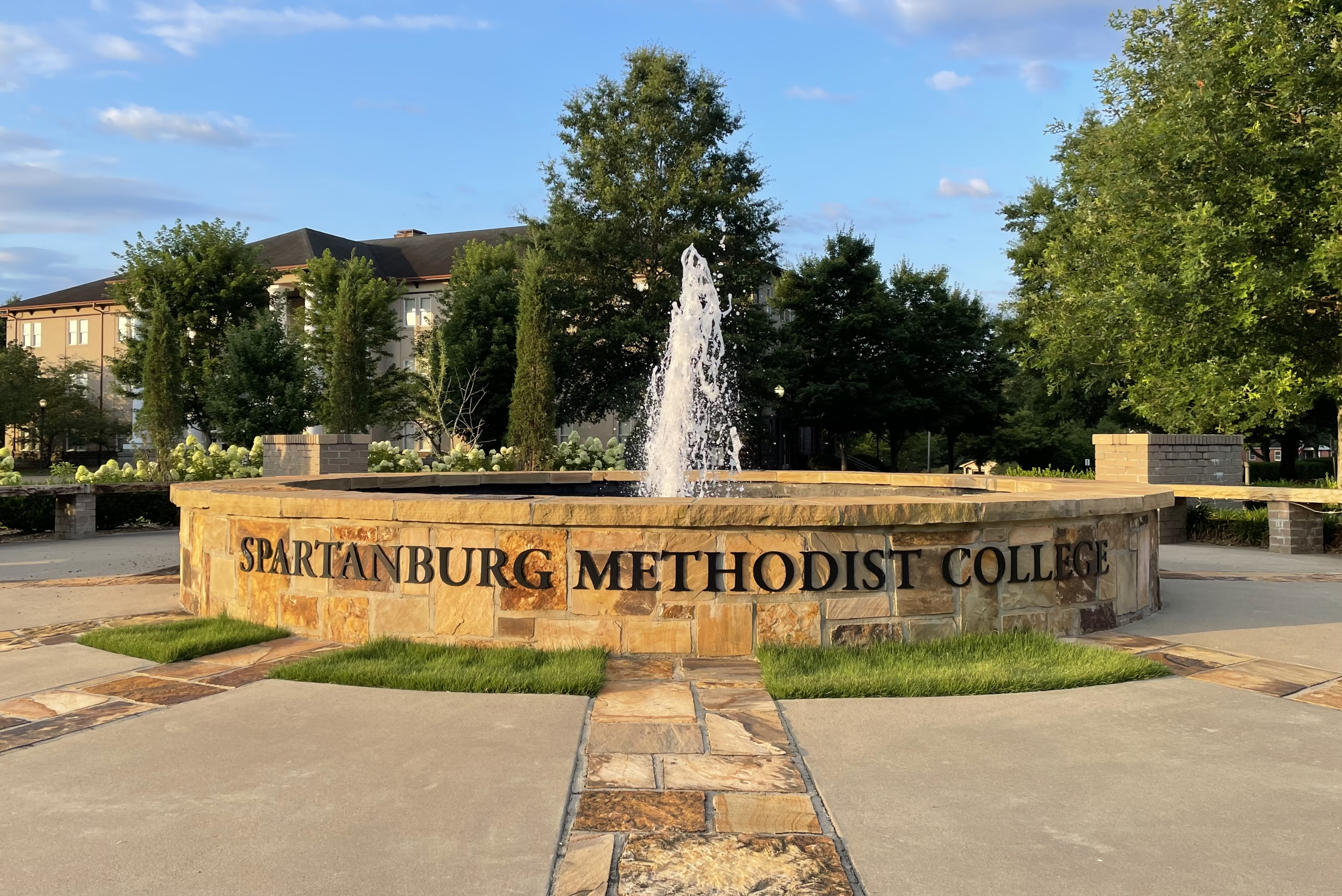
Keith Fountain, named for President Colleen Perry Keith, SMC's seventh President; the fountain was built in 2016.

The university's current president, Scott Cochran, assumed office on November 16, 2015. The president is appointed by the university's board of trustees, which has 24 members, 5 clergy, and 19 laity, whose terms are staggered on a three-year basis.

== Accreditation and affiliations ==
Spartanburg Methodist College is accredited by the Southern Association of Colleges and Schools Commission on Colleges and the University Senate of the United Methodist Church. The college is also affiliated with the United Methodist Church and the South Carolina Annual Conference.

== Academics ==
Spartanburg Methodist College is composed of three schools: the School of English and Humanities, the School of Business and Social Sciences, and the School of Mathematics and Sciences. The liberal arts college offers a range of degree programs to cater to its students' diverse interests and career goals. These include six associate degrees and twelve bachelor degree programs that encompass different concentrations that are offered both on campus and online. The FTE student-to-faculty ratio is 17:1.

=== Camak Core ===
Spartanburg Methodist College incorporates a professional development program into its bachelor's degree programs known as the Camak Core. Named after college founder David English Camak, the program consists of 18 credit hours focused on professional communication, leadership development, community engagement, applied technology, internships, and capstone projects. On-ground bachelor's degree students must complete 120 internship hours as part of the curriculum.

The Camak Core culminates in a senior capstone project. Students present their projects annually at the APEX Showcase, a competition and networking event that connects graduating seniors with employers and community partners.

Fall 2023 Term Demographics
	Percentage
White	44.0
African American	32.0
Hispanic	16.0
Asian	1.0
Multiracial or other	6.0
Non-resident	1.0
Female	55.0
Male	45.0

== Student life ==
Spartanburg Methodist College supports student engagement through campus activities, student leadership opportunities, campus recreation, religious life, and more than 30 clubs and organizations.

=== Student organizations ===
Among the student organizations at Spartanburg Methodist College are the Student Government Association (SGA), the Student Activities Board (SAB), formerly known as XVIBES, Kappa Sigma Alpha (KSA), a co-educational service fraternity, and the Latin American Student Organization (LASO). The college also sponsors a variety of cultural, service, academic, and leadership organizations.

== Campus ==
SMC occupies 110 acres near the western edge of Spartanburg's city limits. The campus has seven residential halls (Willard, Hammond, Kingman, Parsons, Judd, Bridges, and Sparrow) that are co-ed or all-female. Over the past decade, SMC has expanded its campus facilities. In 2012, SMC opened a new academic building, Ellis Hall. It houses nine classrooms, a bookstore, and educational offices, including the office of the Vice President for Academic Affairs, the Write Place, student publications, the President's Hall, and Gibbs Auditorium, which seats 275. In 2019, the 4,000-square-foot Moore Family Fitness Center was opened on campus and provides students with access to aerobics machines, free weights, weight machines, and an aerobics classroom.

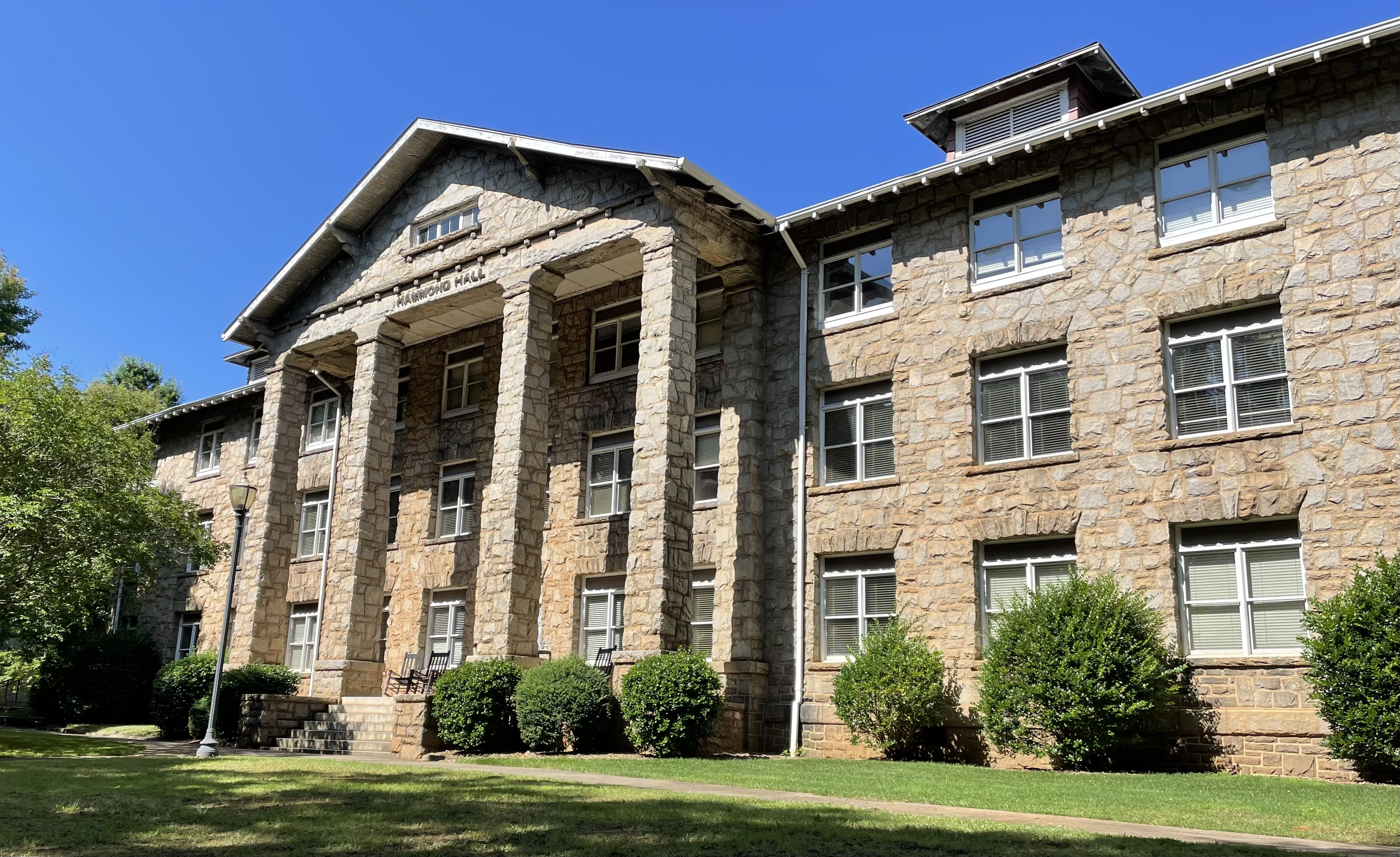
Hammond Hall

== Athletics ==
The Spartanburg Methodist (SMC) athletic teams are called the Pioneers. The college is a member of the National Association of Intercollegiate Athletics (NAIA), primarily competing in the Appalachian Athletic Conference (AAC) starting in the 2025-26 school year. The Pioneers previously competed in the Carolinas Junior College Conference within Region X as a Division I ranked member of the National Junior College Athletic Association (NJCAA) until the conclusion of the 2023-24 academic year.

SMC competes in 14 intercollegiate varsity teams. Men's sports include baseball, basketball, cross-country, golf, soccer, and track and field. Women's sports include basketball, beach volleyball, cross-country, golf, soccer, softball, track and field, and volleyball. All 14 teams transitioned to NAIA competition beginning in the 2024-25 academic year. Men's volleyball will be introduced in the 2026-27 academic year.

=== Accomplishments ===
SMC's athletic teams have won numerous regional, divisional, and national titles during their time in the NJCAA, establishing the college as a competitive athletic program. The men's soccer team won an NJCAA national championship in 1994 under coach Pete Petersen, who compiled a 78-29-6 record over six seasons at SMC and was later named national junior college coach of the year. Following the championship, Petersen left the college to coach professionally with the South Carolina Shamrocks. Since his departure, the program has experienced limited success at the national level. Other teams have also competed nationally, including women's golf (three individual Top 50 finishes, 2011), men's tennis (26th place, 2010), wrestling (29th place, 2010), men's cross-country (2nd place, 2012), women's cross-country (16th place, 2009), men's and women's half-marathon (3rd place, 2012), and volleyball (16th place, 2009).

=== Legacy of Coach Tim Wallace ===
One of the most influential figures in Spartanburg Methodist College athletics was longtime head baseball coach Tim Wallace. Over 34 seasons, Wallace built the Pioneers into a national contender, leading the team to 12 NJCAA Region 10 championships and seven appearances in the Division I JUCO World Series, including three straight from 2012 to 2014. He earned over 1,350 career wins, ranking fourth all-time in junior college baseball. He was inducted into the NJCAA Baseball Coaches Hall of Fame (2014) and the Wofford College Athletic Hall of Fame. In addition to mentoring 18 NJCAA All-Americans and over 150 players who signed professional contracts, Wallace notably coached four-time MLB All-Star Orlando Hudson.

Wallace stepped down in early 2025 due to health issues and died later that year after a battle with brain cancer. A celebration of life was held at SMC's Camak Auditorium, and the college established the Coach Tim Wallace Memorial Fund in his honor.

=== Move to the NAIA ===
On October 2, 2023, it was officially announced that the Spartanburg Methodist Pioneers would join the National Association of Intercollegiate Athletics (NAIA) as a member of the Continental Athletic Conference starting in the 2024-25 academic year. On July 17, 2024, the Appalachian Athletic Conference (AAC) in the NAIA announced that Spartanburg Methodist College will join the conference as a full member for the 2025-26 school year.

== Notable alumni ==
Notable Spartanburg Methodist College alumni include:

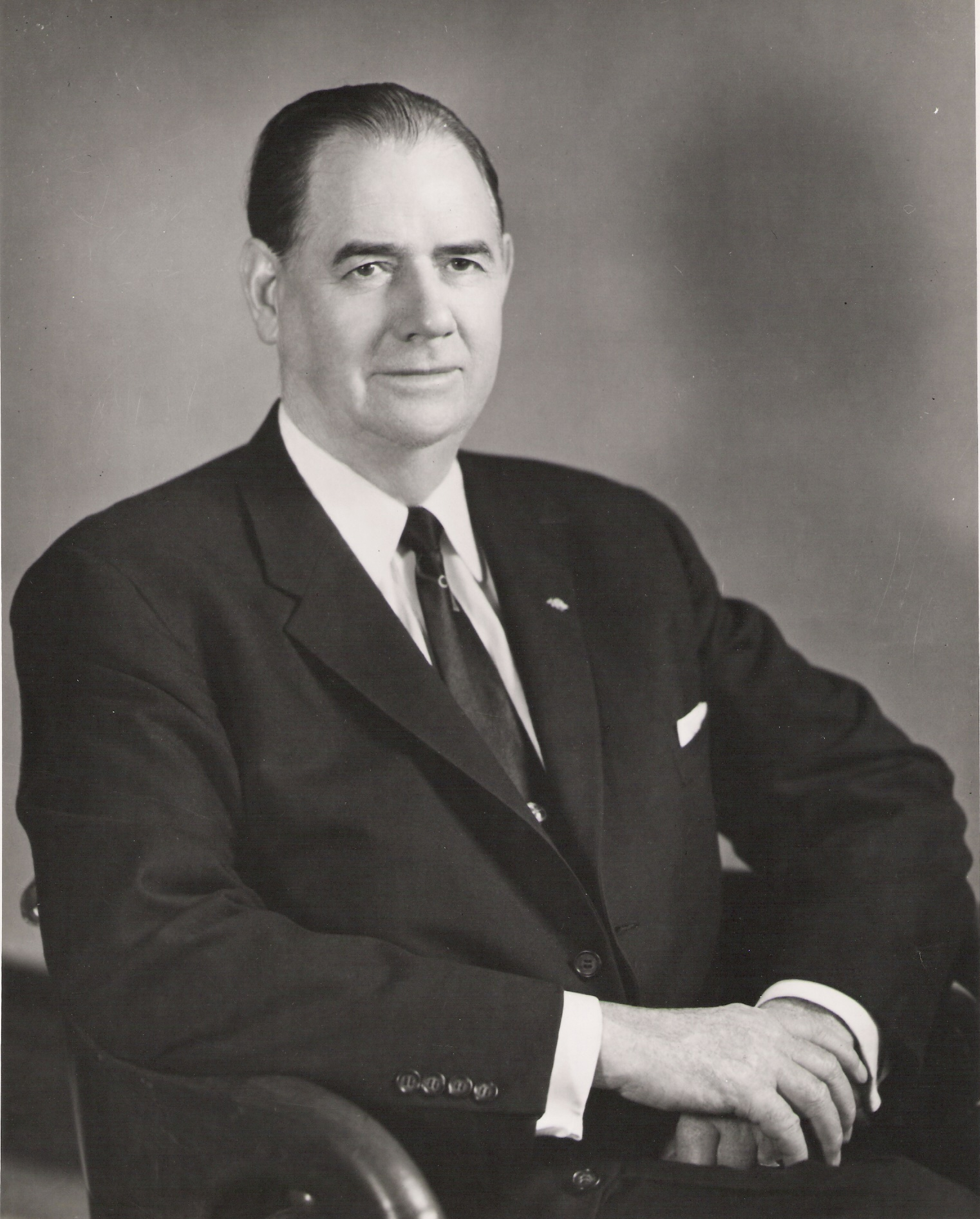
Olin D. Johnston - South Carolina Governor and Senator, a member of the college's first graduating class.

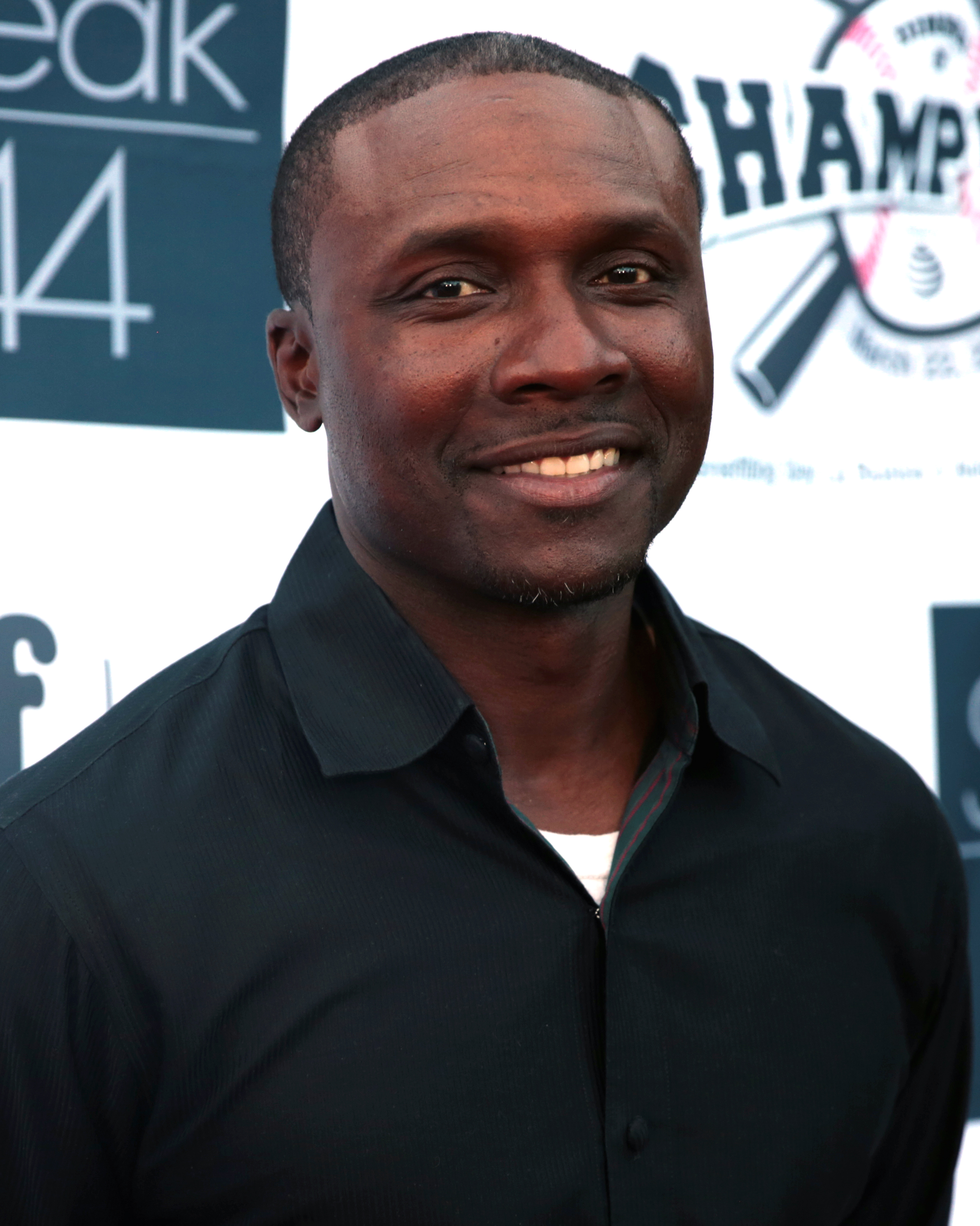
Orlando Hudson - Professional baseball player, known for his career in Major League Baseball.

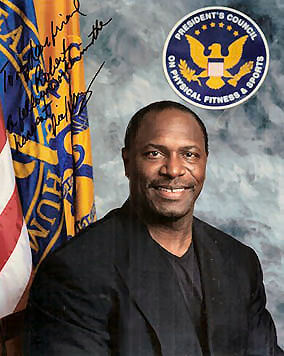
Lee Haney - Eight-time Mr. Olympia.

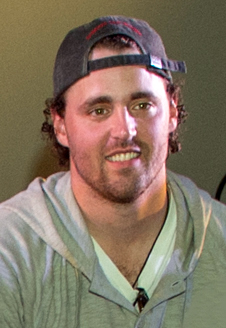
Heath Hembree - Professional baseball pitcher, with a successful MLB career.

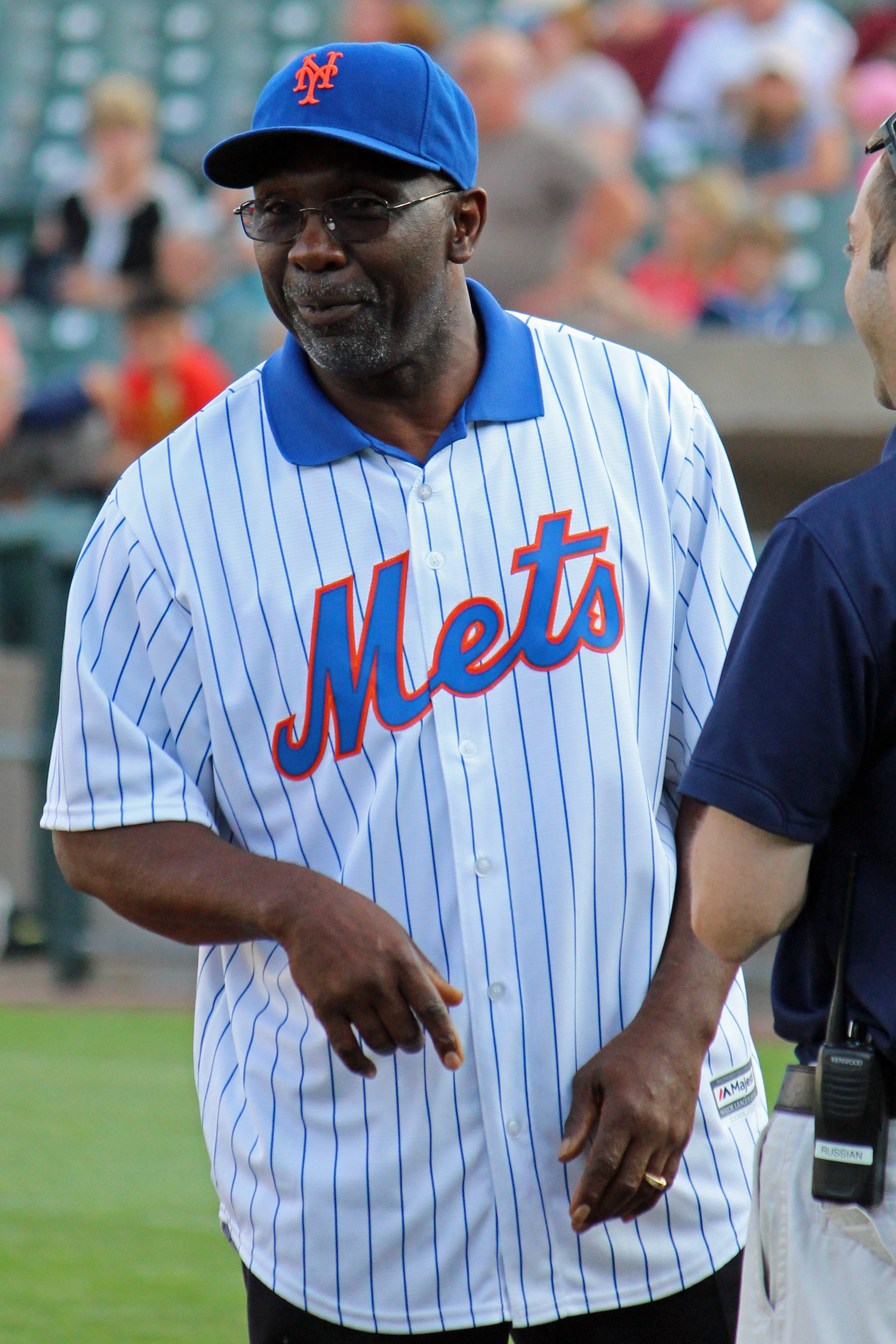
Mookie Wilson - New York Mets Hall of Famer and MLB World Series champion.

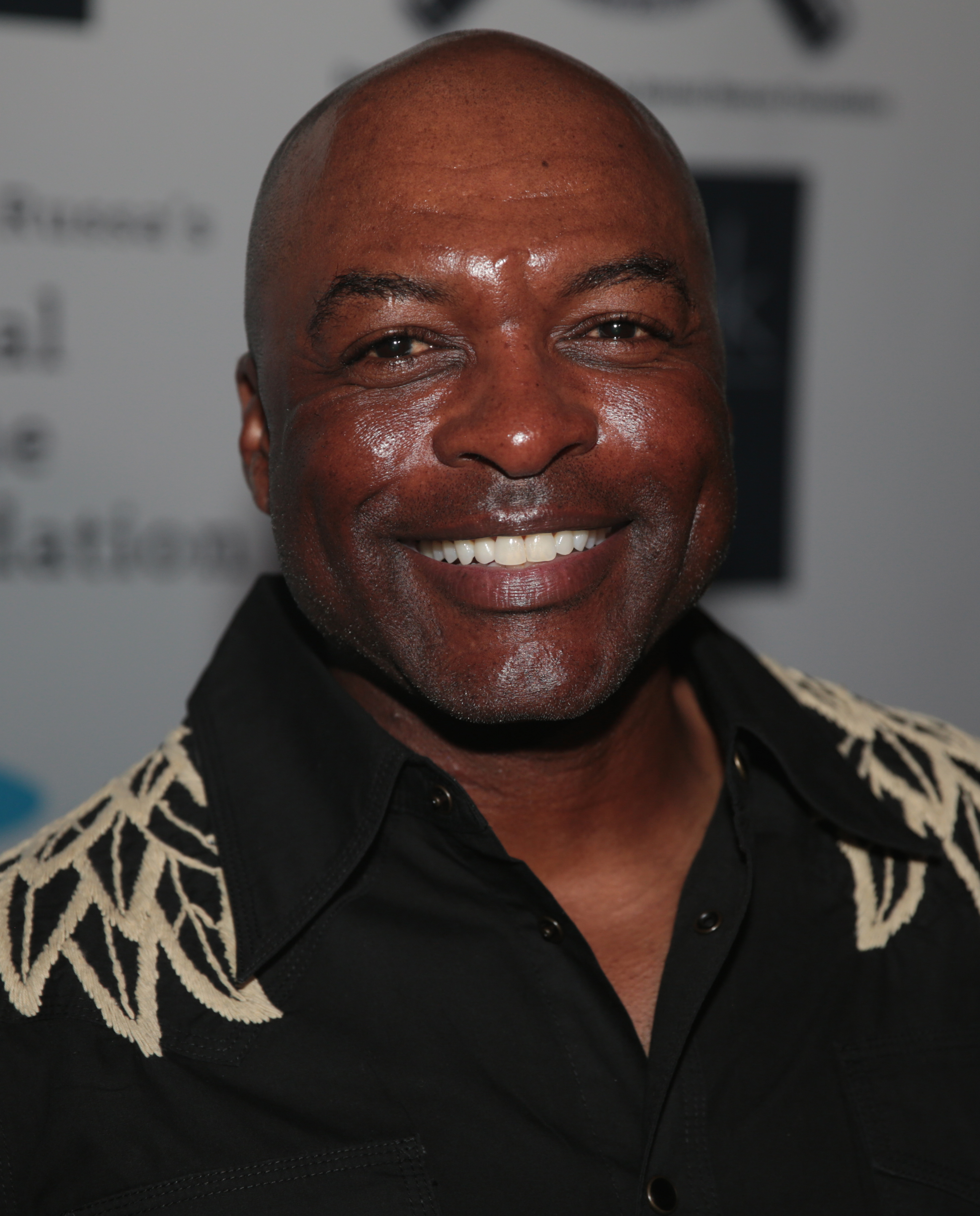
Reggie Sanders - Renowned MLB player and All-Star outfielder.

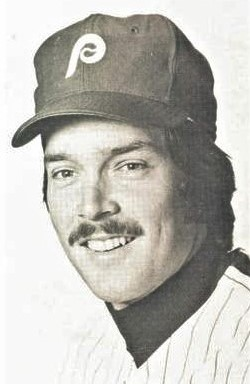
Jerry Martin - MLB player with notable contributions to several teams.

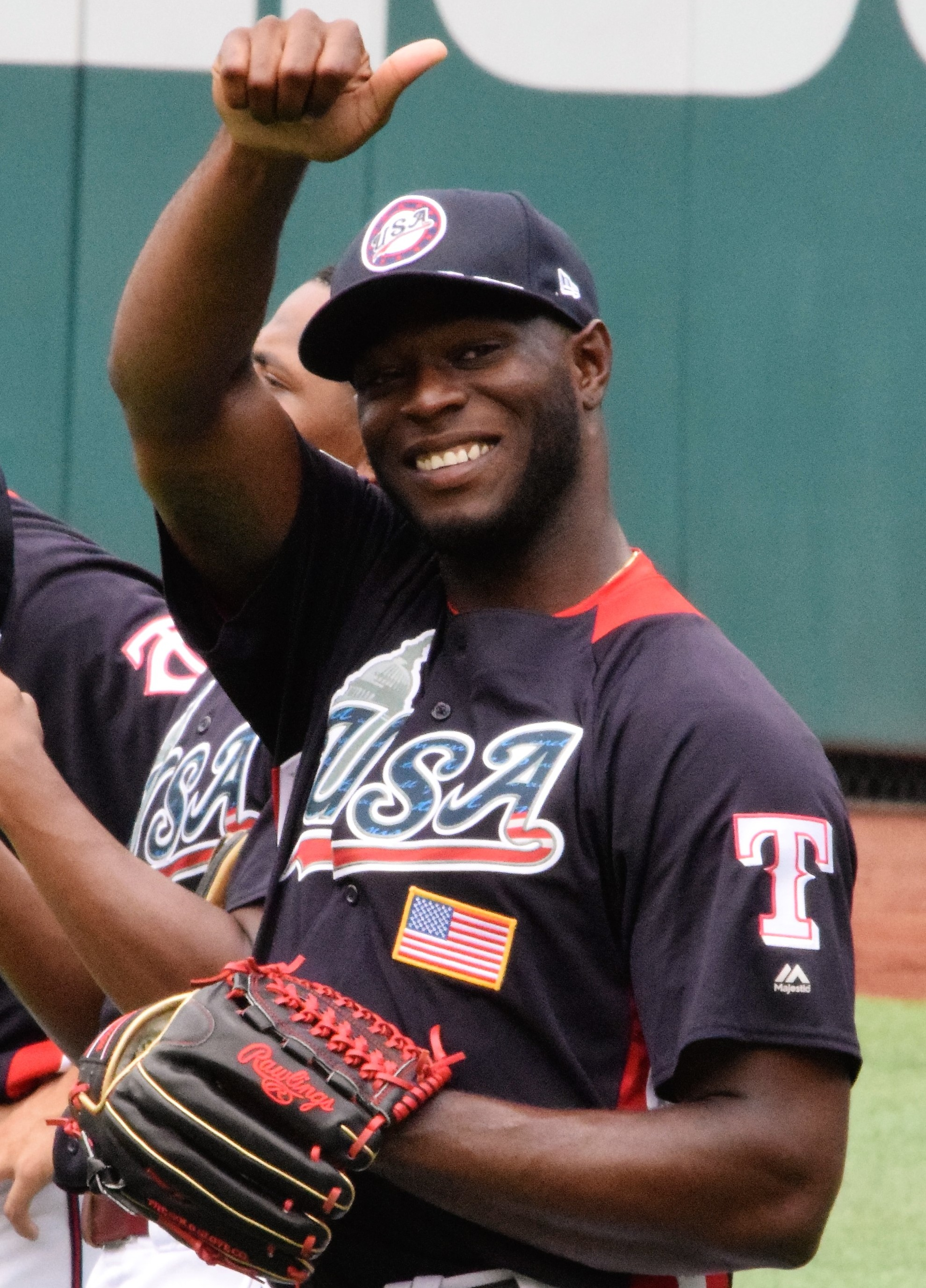
C. D. Pelham - Former MLB pitcher who debuted with the Texas Rangers.

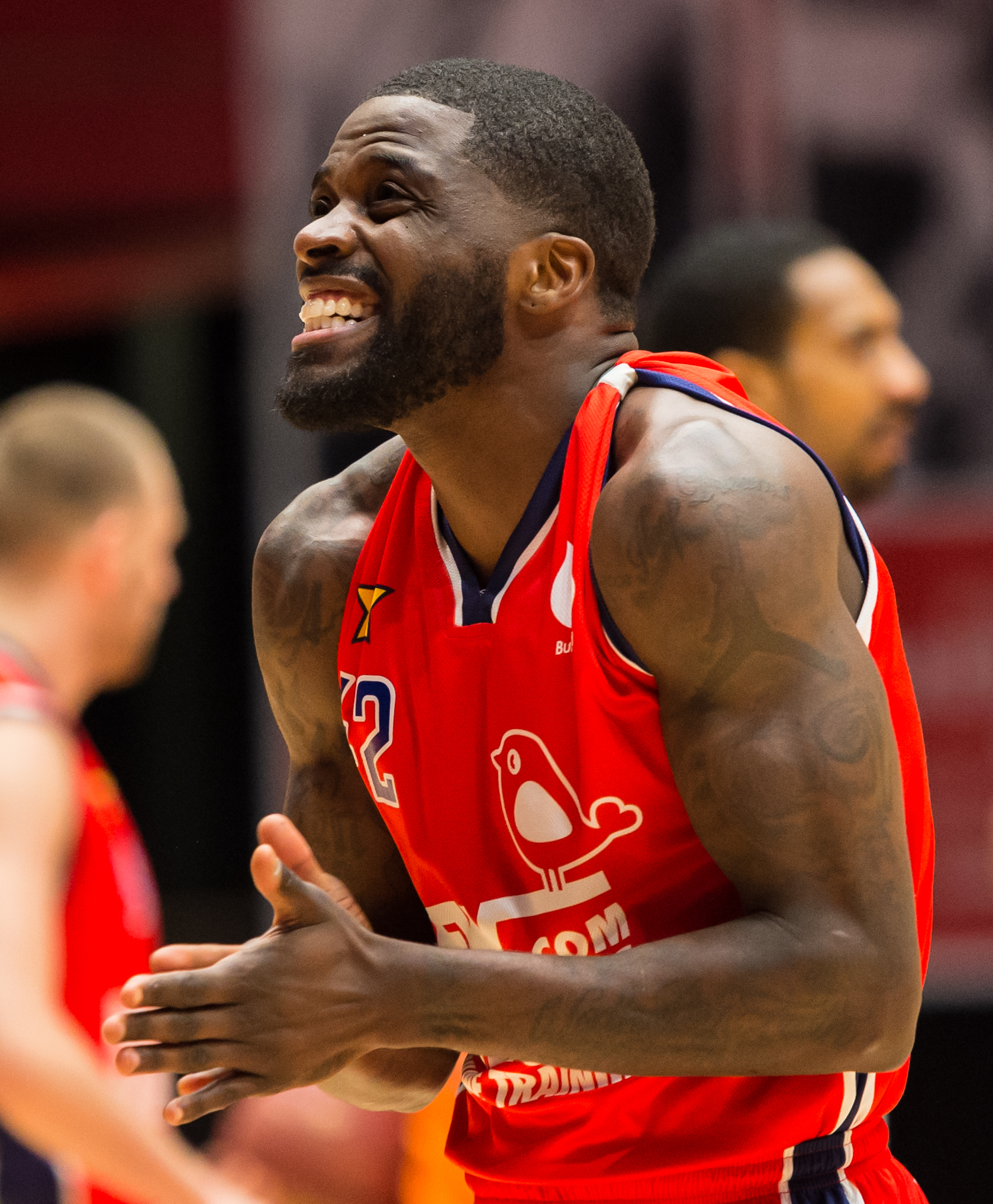
Vernon Taylor - Professional basketball player in Europe.

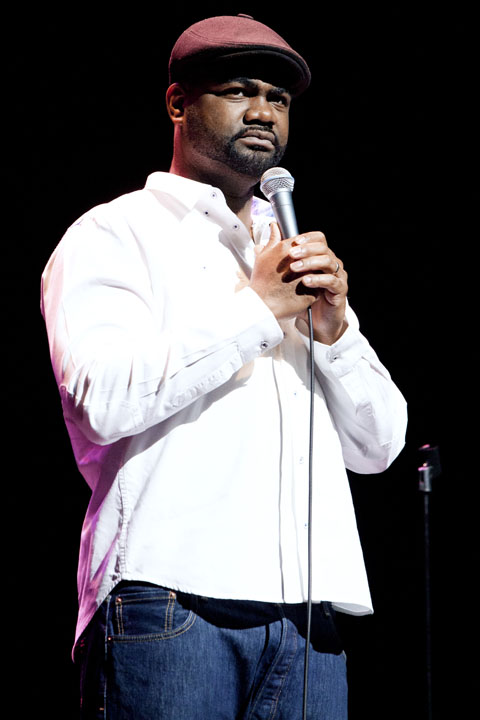
Harris Stanton - Comedian, known for his stand-up performances and television appearances.

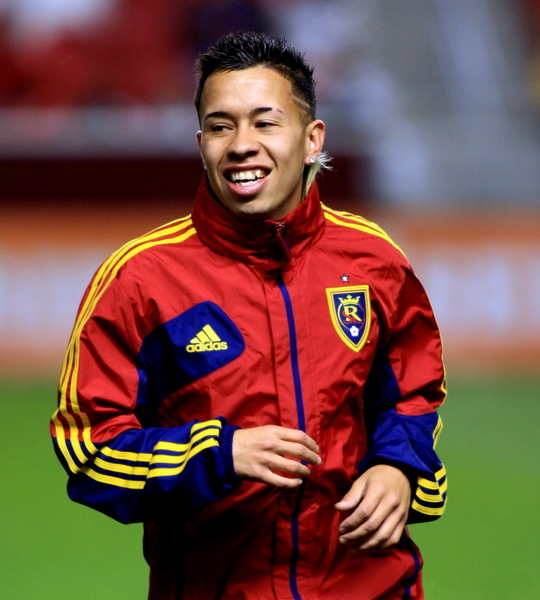
Sebastián Velásquez - Professional soccer player and standout midfielder.

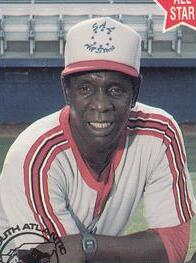
Mel Roberts - Professional baseball coach and former player.

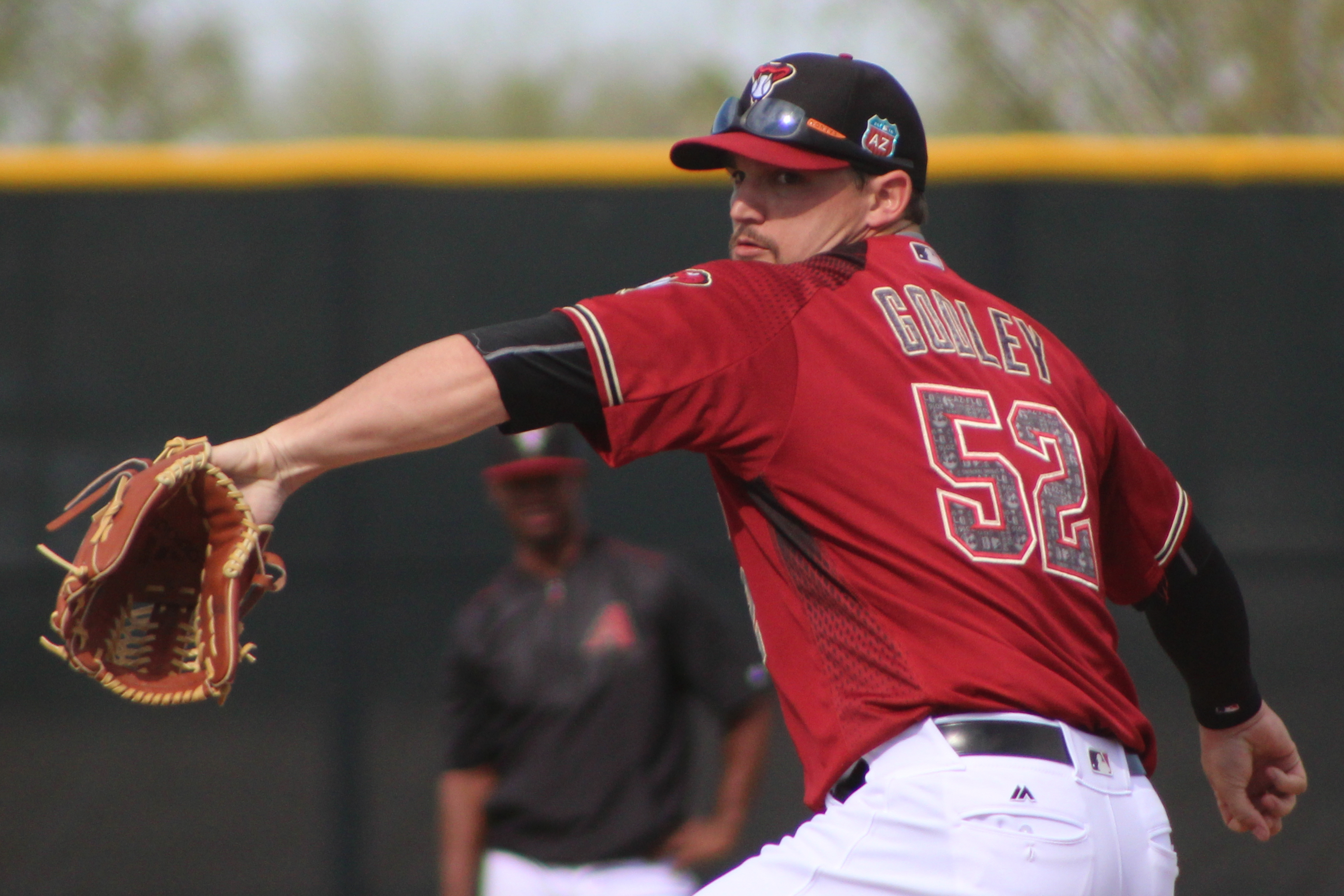
Zack Godley - MLB pitcher with impressive performances in the majors.
- Bill Landrum - professional baseball player
- Lee Gronkiewicz - professional baseball player
- Jonathan Hurst - professional baseball player
- Morris Madden - professional baseball player
- Jeff McNeely - professional baseball player
- James Scott - professional basketball player
- Deryk Shockley - professional soccer player
- Dwight Smith - professional baseball player
- Glenn Sutko - professional baseball player
