= Entertainers with Byron Allen =

American television series

- Genre: Talk show
- Created by: Byron Allen
- Country of origin: United States
- Original language: English

Production
- Executive producers: Byron Allen; Carolyn Folks
- Camera setup: Videotape; Multi-camera
- Production company: Allen Media Group

Original release
- Network: First-run syndication
- Release: September 1993 – present

Entertainers with Byron Allen (formerly EntertainmentStudios.com) is an American interview television series hosted by Byron Allen, which usually aired in syndication during low-profile weekend time slots, such as early afternoons against competing sports events or in overnight periods.

The show typically takes place with Allen doing a short introduction of his guests, then showing interview footage of a celebrity at a press junket (typically the traditional hotel room setting where Allen sits across from the celebrity in front of film posters of the project), along with clips of the film being promoted. Athletes were also interviewed, usually in practice or home settings.

Music videos were also shown to fill out time towards the end of the program. The program was previously known as Entertainment Studios, named after Allen's network of websites encompassing his various other syndicated programs, which is the present name for the production company run by Allen that produces the show.

By 2020, Entertainers with Byron Allen had been on the air for nearly 27 years.

== See also ==
- Entertainment Studios Networks (Allen's associated group of television networks featuring high definition content distributed both by Verizon Fios and traditional syndication)
