= Tracy Morgan =

American actor and comedian (born 1968)

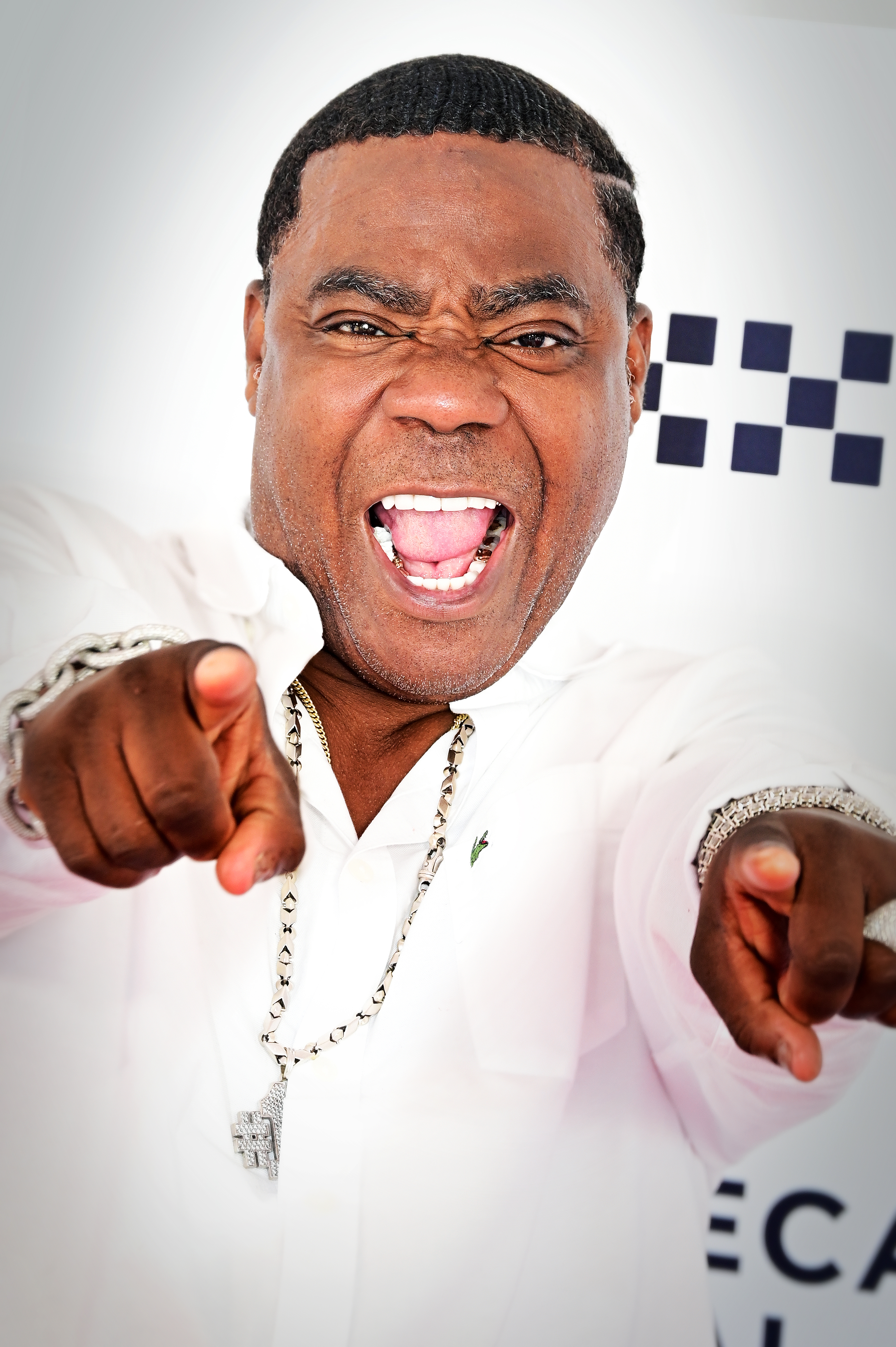
- Morgan in 2026
- Born: November 10, 1968 (age 58); New York City, U.S.
- Spouses: Sabina Morgan (m. 1987; div. 2009) Megan Wollover (m. 2015; div. 2020)
- Children: 4
- Relatives: Nas (third cousin)

Comedy career
- Years active: 1988–present
- Medium: Stand-up, television, film
- Genres: Observational comedy; cringe comedy; sketch comedy; racial humor; satire
- Subjects: African-American culture; race relations; racism; marriage; family; self-deprecation; recreational drug use; sex; current events

Tracy Jamal Morgan (born November 10, 1968) is an American stand-up comedian and actor. He was a cast member on the NBC sketch comedy television series Saturday Night Live from 1996 to 2003 and played Tracy Jordan on the NBC sitcom 30 Rock from 2006 to 2013, both of which earned him a Primetime Emmy Award nomination. He also starred as Tray Barker on the TBS comedy The Last O.G.

== Early life ==
Morgan was born on November 10, 1968, in Brooklyn and raised in Brooklyn's Marlboro Houses and Tompkins Houses in its Bedford–Stuyvesant neighborhood. He is the second of five children of a homemaker, Alicia (née Warden), and James Morgan Jr IV, a musician who left the family when Morgan was six years old.

His father named him Tracy in honor of a platoon mate and friend who shipped off to Vietnam with him and was killed in action days later.

The target of bullies as a child, Morgan attended DeWitt Clinton High School in The Bronx. In 1985, during his senior year, he learned that his father had contracted HIV from hypodermic needle use. His father died in January 1987, aged 38.

Morgan married his girlfriend Sabina that year and dropped out of high school just four credits short of his diploma to care for his ailing father. Living on welfare, Morgan sold crack cocaine with limited success, but began earning money performing comedy on the streets after his best friend was murdered. He said in 2009: "He would say to me, 'Yo, Tracy, man, you should be doing comedy.' A week later, he was murdered. And that for me, that was like my Vietnam. I had my survival guilt when I started to achieve success. Why I made it out and some guys didn't."

Morgan embarked on a stand-up comedy career, successfully enough that he "finally moved to a nice community in [The Bronx neighborhood of] Riverdale, from a run-down apartment next to Yankee Stadium in the Bronx."

== Career ==
=== Early work in comedy and television ===
Morgan made his screen debut playing Hustle Man on the sitcom Martin. The character sold various items from the "hood", always greeting people with his signature "What's happ'n, chief?", and had a pet dog he dressed as a rapper. (Later, in the 2003 Chris Rock film Head of State, Morgan appeared as a man watching television, often questioning why they are not watching Martin.)

Morgan was also a regular cast member on Uptown Comedy Club, a sketch-comedy show filmed in Harlem that aired for two seasons, from 1992 to 1994.

Morgan joined the cast of the comedy series Saturday Night Live in 1996, and performed as a regular until 2003. Producer Lorne Michaels chose him over Stephen Colbert in the final round of auditions. Morgan's regular characters included the kindly but deluded vagrant Woodrow; outspoken apartment maintenance man Dominican Lou; lusty Astronaut Jones whose short skits ended with blunt sexual propositions towards beautiful extraterrestrial ladies; and Safari Planet host Brian Fellow who was enthusiastic but deeply ignorant about animals.

=== Post-SNL, 30 Rock, and film career ===
After leaving the cast of SNL in 2003, Morgan starred in his own sitcom, The Tracy Morgan Show, debuting in 2003. The show was subsequently canceled after one season. During the same year, he was featured on an episode of Punk'd in which his car was towed from valet parking.

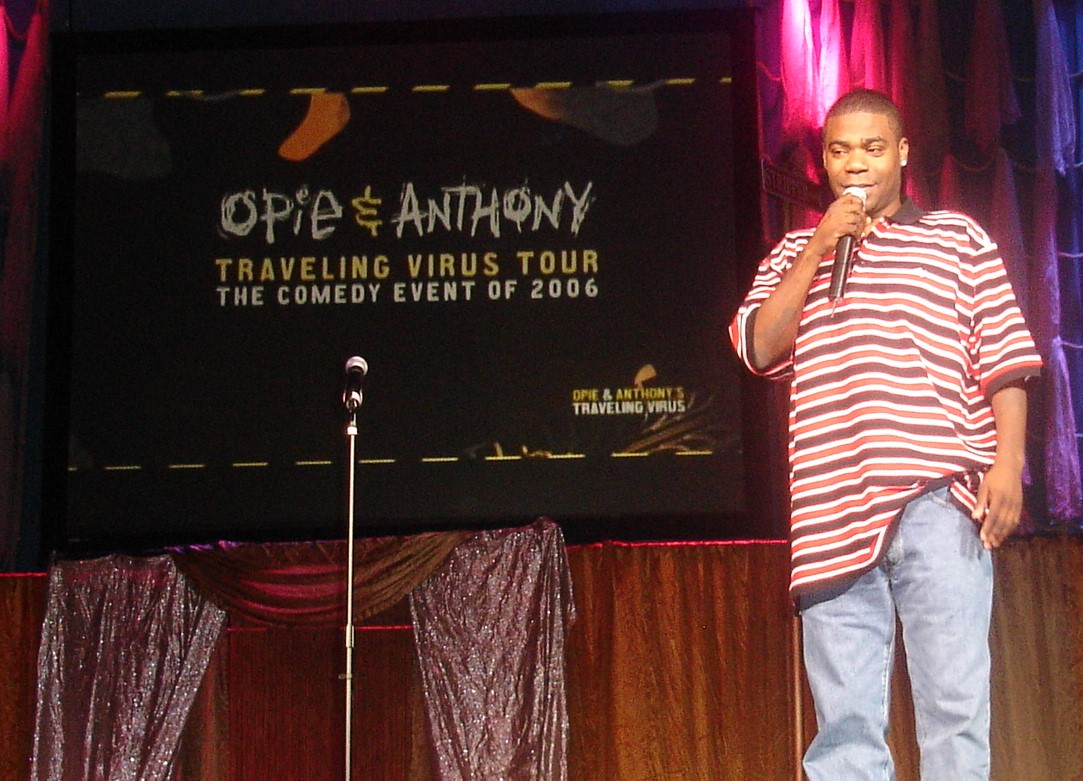
Morgan on stage during Opie and Anthony's Traveling Virus Comedy Tour in 2006

From 2006 to 2013, Morgan was a cast member of the television series 30 Rock. He played the character Tracy Jordan, a caricature of himself. His work on 30 Rock was well-received, and he was nominated for Outstanding Supporting Actor in a Comedy Series at the 2009 Emmy Awards. He returned to the role in July 2020 for a reunion episode during the COVID-19 pandemic that was an upfront special for NBCUniversal. After 30 Rock, beginning in 2018, Morgan began starring in the TBS series The Last O.G. It ran for four seasons until 2021.

Morgan returned to host SNL on March 14, 2009, and reprised his roles as Brian Fellow and Astronaut Jones. He later made a guest appearance on the 2011 Christmas show, hosted by Jimmy Fallon, and again hosted the show on October 17, 2015.

In addition to his television and comedy career, Morgan has acted in several comedy movies, alongside Adam Sandler, Eddie Murphy, and Will Ferrell. In Adam Sandler's film The Longest Yard, he plays a transgender inmate. He has taken on a number of voice acting roles. He plays Spoonie Luv on the Comedy Central program Crank Yankers and as Woof in the animated series Where My Dogs At? He was the voice of Luis in the animated film Rio.

Morgan has had a number of solo stand-up specials produced throughout his career. One Mic was produced and aired on Comedy Central in 2002. His other comedy specials include Tracy Morgan: Bona Fide in 2014 and Staying Alive in 2017, released after he was severely injured in a 2014 car accident. Morgan made a surprise appearance at the 67th Primetime Emmy Awards on September 20, 2015, and was greeted with a standing ovation. He hosted the first Spike Guys' Choice Awards, which aired on June 13, 2007.

=== Current work ===
Morgan acted in commercials for NFL 2K, NBA 2K, and NHL 2K, co-starring with Warren Sapp, Ben Wallace and Jeremy Roenick.

In July 2019, he hosted the ESPYs in Los Angeles.

In 2022, the New York Friars Club bestowed the Entertainment Icon Award on Morgan at the club's spring gala. Morgan is the ninth recipient of the prestigious comedy award, and the first Black recipient.

In May 2025, it was announced that Morgan would star in the Tina Fey-produced television series The Fall and Rise of Reggie Dinkins alongside Daniel Radcliffe and Erika Alexander. In October 2025, the sitcom Crutch starring Morgan was released on Paramount+. The show follows Morgan playing a recent widower who is a devilish yet loving father to two adult children who move back home to Harlem. Tracy Morgan recorded PSA announcements for MTA New York City Transit in 2026.

=== Autobiography ===
On October 20, 2009, Morgan's autobiography, I Am the New Black, was released. The book includes stories about living in Tompkins Projects in Bed–Stuy, Brooklyn, to becoming a cast member on Saturday Night Live. Morgan appeared on National Public Radio's Fresh Air hosted by Terry Gross, at times becoming very emotional about his former life in a New York ghetto.

== Influences ==
Morgan has listed Carol Burnett, Lucille Ball, Jackie Gleason, Martin Lawrence, Eddie Murphy, and Richard Pryor as among his primary comedic influences.

== Personal life ==
=== Family ===
In 1987, while in high school, Morgan married his girlfriend Sabina. The pair have three sons together. Morgan filed for divorce in August 2009, after having been separated for approximately eight years. Morgan credits one of his sons with having saved him from his alcoholism. Of his extended family, Morgan said in 2009, "I'm estranged from my own mother and most of my family, and I'm not sure that's going to change much". Morgan then dated Tanisha Hall. She donated one of her kidneys to Morgan in December 2010.

In September 2011, on the red carpet at the Emmy Awards, Morgan announced he and model Megan Wollover had become engaged six months earlier in San Francisco. Their first child, a daughter, was born in New York City on July 2, 2013. Morgan and Wollover married on August 23, 2015. Morgan filed for divorce July 2020.

In 2023, on an episode of Finding Your Roots, Morgan discovered he is third cousins with American rapper Nas.

Morgan joked that working with Daniel Radcliffe on The Fall and Rise of Reggie Dinkins made him "a cool Dad".

=== Health ===
In 1996, Morgan was diagnosed with diabetes mellitus and for years has been an alcoholic. Morgan has conceded that many of his own troubles were incorporated within 30 Rock episodes. In early December 2010, Morgan received a kidney transplant necessitated by his diabetes and alcohol use.

In August 2023, Morgan responded to a comment about his healthy appearance during an episode of Today with Hoda & Jenna by disclosing that he was using semaglutide. In March 2024, he told Jimmy Fallon that he had "learned to out-eat Ozempic" and "gained 40 lbs", but later clarified that he was joking, saying "Ozempic did great by me and I was glad to use it."

On March 17, 2025, while sitting courtside at an NBA basketball game at Madison Square Garden between the New York Knicks and Miami Heat, Morgan experienced an episode of food poisoning, which caused him to vomit onto the basketball court sideline and suffer a bloody nose. He joked on his Instagram post from the hospital saying, "More importantly, the Knicks are now 1-0 when I throw up on the court so maybe I'll have to break it out again in the playoffs."

=== Comments on homosexuality ===
During a performance in Nashville, Tennessee, on June 3, 2011, Morgan made remarks about homosexuals, reportedly stating that if his son were gay, his son better speak to him like a man or he would "pull out a knife and stab him." Morgan apologized, saying that he had "gone too far." In response, head of NBC Entertainment Bob Greenblatt and Morgan's coworker on 30 Rock, Tina Fey, stated they did not condone the comments made by Morgan, and were happy to see him make a sincere apology.

=== 2014 traffic collision and lawsuit ===
On June 7, 2014, Morgan was a passenger in a Mercedes Sprinter minibus involved in a six-vehicle crash on the New Jersey Turnpike near Cranbury when it was struck from behind by a Walmart tractor-trailer, causing a chain reaction crash. Morgan and three other comedians, including Harris Stanton, along with Morgan's assistant and two limousine company employees, who were traveling on Morgan's "Turn it Funny" stand-up comedy tour, were involved in the crash. The crash killed Morgan's friend and collaborator, 62-year-old comedian James McNair (Jimmy Mack). Morgan was taken to the hospital with a broken femur, broken nose, a traumatic brain injury, and several broken ribs, and underwent surgery on his leg on June 8. From June 20 to July 12, Morgan stayed in a rehabilitation facility to recover from the injuries sustained during the crash.

The driver of the truck which caused the accident pleaded not guilty to criminal charges, and an early investigation by National Transportation Safety Board found the driver had been on the road for nearly as many hours as the legal limit. Morgan also sued Walmart for negligence, settling in 2015 for an undisclosed amount.

On June 1, 2015, Morgan made his first public appearance since the crash, in an interview with Matt Lauer on Today, stating he still suffered from symptoms of his injuries. On the November 3, 2016 episode of Conan, Morgan said that he was no longer angry about the collision and had forgiven the driver. Morgan's 2017 Netflix standup special Staying Alive joked about Walmart and the lawsuit, while detailing his hospitalization, rehab and recovery.

=== 2019 car accident handling ===
In June 2019, Morgan was involved in a minor collision in his newly purchased Bugatti Veyron, and he was captured on video slamming on the other driver's window and yelling, "Bitch, get out of the car". According to Mercury News, the other driver was traumatized by Morgan's conduct. A CBS News reporter visited Morgan to get his side of the story and Morgan allowed the reporter through his gate, answered the door himself, but refused to talk.

== Filmography ==
=== Film ===
Year	Title	Role	Notes
1996	A Thin Line Between Love and Hate	Bartender	
1998	Half Baked	V. J.	
2000	Bamboozled	TV personality	
2001	How High	Commercial actor/Field of Dreams Guy	Uncredited
2001	WaSanGo	Woo Ping	Voice; English dub
2001	Jay and Silent Bob Strike Back	Pumpkin Escobar	
2001	30 Years to Life	Troy	
2002	Frank McKlusky, C.I.	Reggie Rosengold	
2003	Head of State	Meat hustler	
2004	Eternal Sunshine of the Spotless Mind	Joel's Neighbour	Scenes deleted
2005	The Longest Yard	Ms. Tucker	
2005	Are We There Yet?	Satchel Paige Bobblehead	Voice
2006	Little Man	Percy	
2006	VH1's Totally Awesome	Darnell	
2006	Farce of the Penguins	Marcus	Voice
2008	First Sunday	Leejohn	
2008	Superhero Movie	Professor Xavier	
2009	G-Force	Blaster	Voice
2009	Deep in the Valley	Busta Nut	
2010	Cop Out	Paul Hodges	
2010	Death at a Funeral	Norman	
2010	The Other Guys	Himself	
2011	Rio	Luiz	Voice
2011	The Son of No One	Vincent Carter	
2011	Chick Magnet	Tracy	
2012	Why Stop Now	Leopold "Sprinkles" Leonard	
2014	Rio 2	Luiz	Voice
2014	The Boxtrolls	Mr. Gristle	Voice
2014	Top Five	Fred	
2015	Accidental Love	Keyshawn	
2015	The Night Before	Narrator / Santa Claus	
2017	Fist Fight	Coach Crawford	
2017	The Clapper	Chris	
2017	The Star	Felix	Voice
2019	What Men Want	Joe "Dolla" Barry	
2020	Scoob!	Captain Caveman	Voice; Cameo
2021	Coming 2 America	Kareem "Uncle Reem" Junson	
2022	Spirited	Yet to Come	Voice
2025	Being Eddie	Himself	Documentary
2026	Swapped	Boogle/Firewolf	Voice

=== Television ===
Year	Show	Role	Notes
1992–1994	Uptown Comedy Club	Various	
1994–1996	Martin	Hustle Man	7 episodes
1996–2003	Saturday Night Live	Various roles	128 episodes
2000	3rd Rock from the Sun	Tracy Morgan	Episode: "Dick'll Take Manhattan: Part 1"
2002	Tracy Morgan: One Mic	Himself	Stand-up special
2002–2005, 2019–2021	Crank Yankers	Spoonie Luv	Voice
2003–2004	The Tracy Morgan Show	Tracy Mitchell	18 episodes; also producer
2006	Mind of Mencia	Captain Black Cawk	Episode: "Stereotype Olympics"
2006	Where My Dogs At?	Woof	Voice; 8 episodes
2006–2013, 2020	30 Rock	Tracy Jordan	137 episodes
2008	Human Giant	The Invisible Man	Voice; Episode: "I Want More Corn Chowder"
2008–2013	Scare Tactics	Himself (host)	20 episodes
2009	Saturday Night Live	Himself (host)	Episode: "Tracy Morgan/Kelly Clarkson"
2010	Tracy Morgan: Black and Blue	Himself	Stand-up special; also executive producer
2014	Tracy Morgan: Bona Fide	Himself	Stand-up special; also executive producer
2014	Mr. Pickles	Skids	Voice; Episode: "Dead Man's Curve"
2015	Saturday Night Live	Himself (host)	Episode: "Tracy Morgan/Demi Lovato"
2017	Tracy Morgan: Staying Alive	Himself	Stand-up special
2018	Somebody Feed Phil	Himself	Episode: "New York City"
2018	The Raw Word	Himself	Episode #1.15
2018	The Simpsons	Himself, Tow Truck Driver	Voice; 2 episodes
2018	Animals	Toaster	Voice; Episode: "Stuff"
2018–2021	The Last O.G.	Tray Barker	Main cast; also executive producer
2019	The Twilight Zone	J.C. Wheeler	Episode: "The Comedian"
2019	Green Eggs and Ham	Michael the Fox	Voice; 2 episodes
2019	Bubble Guppies	Dr. Bigmouth Bass	Voice; Episode: "Secret Agent Nonny!"
2021	Squidbillies	Early Cuyler	Voice, season 13
2022, 2025	The Neighborhood	Curtis Butler / Francois "Crutch" Crutchfield	Episodes: "Welcome to Bro Money, Bro Problems", "Welcome to Family Value"
2023	Tracy Morgan: Takin' It Too Far	Himself	Stand-up special
2023	The Santa Clauses	Easter Bunny	Episode: "Chapter Nine: No Magic at the Dinner Table!"
2025	Octopus!	Himself	2 episodes
2025	Crutch	Francois "Crutch" Crutchfield	Main cast; also executive producer
2026	The Fall and Rise of Reggie Dinkins	Reggie Dinkins	Main cast; also executive producer

== Awards and nominations ==
- Emmy Awards
  - 2009, Outstanding Supporting Actor in a Comedy Series, 30 Rock, nominated
  - 2016, Outstanding Guest Actor in a Comedy Series, Saturday Night Live, nominated
- Image Awards
  - 2007, Outstanding Supporting Actor in a Comedy Series, 30 Rock, nominated
  - 2008, Outstanding Supporting Actor in a Comedy Series, 30 Rock, nominated
- New York Friars Club
  - 2022, Entertainment Icon Award

Preceded by Jim Cummings	Voice of Captain Caveman; 2020 film Scoob!	Succeeded by Jim Conroy
