= Case Closed (film) =

1988 American TV film

- Genre: Mystery, Detective
- Screenplay by: Byron Allen
- Directed by: Dick Lowry
- Starring: Charles Durning; Byron Allen; Erica Gimpel
- Composer: Sylvester Levay
- Country of origin: United States
- Original language: English

Production
- Producer: Andrew Gottlieb
- Production location: Atlanta, Georgia
- Cinematography: Brian West
- Editor: Fred A. Chulack
- Running time: 93 minutes
- Production companies: Houston Motion Picture Entertainment; CBS Entertainment

Original release
- Network: CBS
- Release: April 19, 1988

Case Closed is a 1988 American made-for-television film. The film starred Charles Durning and Byron Allen. Byron Allen was also the co-writer and co-producer on the film. It was directed by Dick Lowry. The film was shot in Atlanta, Georgia, and was broadcast on CBS on April 19, 1988.

== Plot ==
David Brockman, a hip young black police detective, uncovers a suspicious link between three recent murders and an unsolved, 15-year old cold case involving the theft of The Third Star of Africa diamond.

Desperate for a lead, he seeks the reluctant assistance of gruff Les Kabalski, the now retired police officer who investigated the diamond case - the only case he never solved. This unlikely pair strikes up a strange partnership full of arguments about love, life and the law.

High-powered action mixes with high-spirited comedy (Brockman's quicksilver tongue often gets him into trouble with killers, cuties and other police officers) as the two men follow a deadly trail of murders through a contemporary Los Angeles of transvestites and midget wrestlers, capped by some hair-raising car chases.

== Reception ==
Don Shirley of the Los Angeles Times gave the movie a negative review.
