= DJ Cobra =

Open format deejay

- Birth name: Andrew Grant Bagg
- Also known as: Double Bagger
- Born: June 8, 1981 (age 44) Los Angeles, California, United states
- Genres: House; Electronic; Dance; Hip Hop; Turntablism
- Occupation(s): Producer, DJ
- Instrument(s): Keyboards, turntables, sampler, synthesizer
- Years active: 1998–present
- Website: djcobra.com

Andrew Bagg (born June 8, 1981), better known by his stage name DJ Cobra, is an open format deejay.

== Early life ==
DJ Cobra was born in Los Angeles, California. His music career began while he was a student attending the University of Arizona. After submitting a mixtape to KOHT—now an iHeartRadio station in Tucson, Arizona—he became one of the youngest deejays on commercial radio in the country. There, he enjoyed #1 ratings and caught the attention of several record labels and promoters.

DJ Cobra was offered jobs in the music industry, but he instead went on to open for artists, form a deejay crew in Los Angeles for a period of time, and attended his first tour as an opening act for Nelly in 2003.

== Career ==
DJ Cobra has since held multiple residencies in Hollywood, San Diego, Chicago, and Las Vegas; he also spins for several clubs throughout the United States. He has also toured, opened for, and/or performed with several artists like P. Diddy, Prince, Ludacris, Nelly, John Legend, and Lady Gaga. DJ Cobra also toured with Guy Fieri in 2010 and returned to the road with him in 2011 for a second tour.

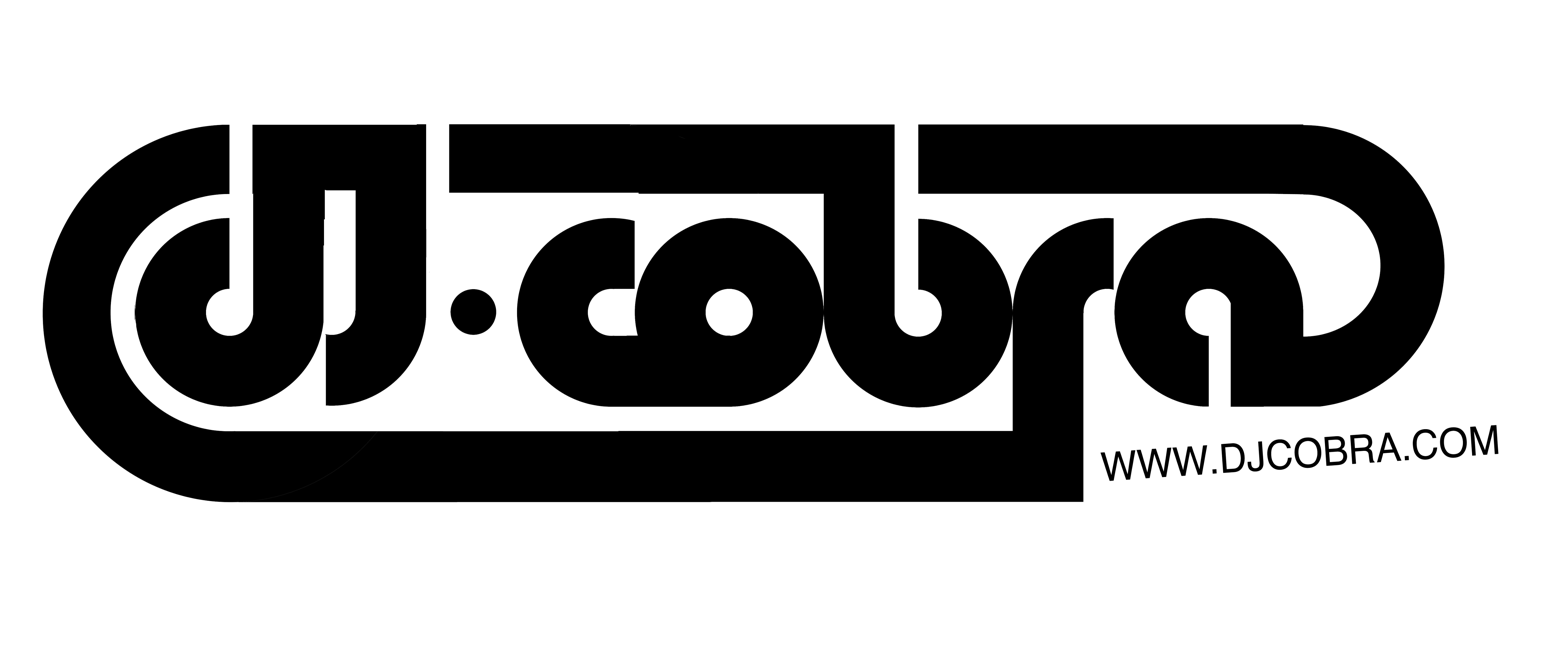
Logo

DJ Cobra has additionally played private and corporate events in the United States including but not limited to Paris Hilton’s 30th birthday party in Hollywood, The Weinstein Company's Golden Globe party, Ferrari's 458 Launch party with John Mayer, MTV's BlackBerry-sponsored VMA Party with Ne-Yo, the South Beach Food and Wine Festival, Aubrey Oday's All About Aubrey launch event, Miley Cyrus's 18th birthday party, AT&T and Fox's American Idol official events, Star Magazine's Young Hollywood event, Hollywood Life's Young Hollywood Awards, NASCAR events with Danica Patrick, South Park's 200th anniversary event, MTV's Real World cast party in Las Vegas, Madonna's Material Girl clothing line launch party with Kelly Osbourne, Jamie Foxx's NBA All Star Weekend party, and others.

He has also made numerous television appearances on shows including Jimmy Kimmel Live!, Last Call with Carson Daly, and Comics Unleashed. Cobra was the featured deejay on Good Morning America's Oscar Special.

== Discography ==
=== Mixtapes ===
- Iller (2009)
- Illionaire (2011)

== Filmography ==
- Comics Unleashed (2006–2008)
- The Best of Comics Unleashed with Byron Allen (2008)
- Jimmy Kimmel Live! (2008)
- Storage Wars (2013)
