= Darren Carter (comedian) =

American actor and stand-up comedian

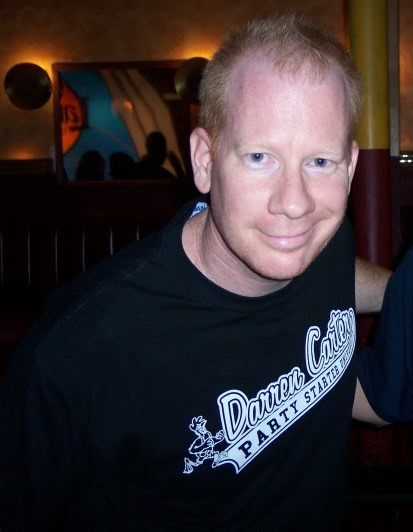
- Carter at the Laugh Factory in August 2008
- Born: Fresno, California, U.S.
- Other name: The Party Starter
- Spouse: Genie Carter (m. 1997)
- Children: 1

Comedy career
- Years active: 1990–present
- Medium: Stand-up comedy; film; television
- Genres: Sketch comedy; observational comedy; impersonations
- Website: Official Website

Darren Carter is an American stand-up comedian, actor and impressionist. Carter has performed on The Tonight Show with Jay Leno, Comics Unleashed, Premium Blend on Comedy Central, and as a supporting character in the 2005 feature film Be Cool with John Travolta.

== Early life ==
Darren Carter was born and raised in Fresno, California.

== Personal life ==
Carter has been married to his wife Genie, since 1997. Together, they have a son.

== Filmography ==
=== Film ===
Year	Title	Role	Notes
1990	Sylvan Lake Summer	1st Dance Band	
1996	Savage	Shazam	
2005	Be Cool	Glenn	
2011	Bobby Khan's Ticket to Hollywood	Professor Smith	

=== Television ===
Year	Title	Role	Notes
1996	The Jamie Foxx Show	Thug	Episode: "A Thanksgiving to Remember"
1999	Common Ground	Chip	
2006	Cuts	Pete	Episode: "Rogue Trip"
2011	Laugh Out Loud Comedy Festival	Himself	Episode: "Darren Carter 'That Ginger's Crazy'"
2018	No Money Down	Keith	Television film

=== Video games ===
Year	Title	Role	Notes
2005	Tony Hawk's American Wasteland	Additional voices	
