= Wild World of Spike =

- Genre: Reality television
- Starring: Kit Cope; Jason Ellis; Sam Tripoli
- Country of origin: United States
- Original language: English
- No. of seasons: 1
- No. of episodes: 14

Production
- Running time: 30 minutes

Original release
- Network: Spike
- Release: January 6 – May 17, 2007

Wild World of Spike is a television series about extreme sports that aired Thursdays on Spike. The three hosts, two of whom are athletes themselves, watch these from a couch on the set. They then recreate stunts.

== Episode list ==
- Episode 1: Episode #1.1

Original Air Date: January 6, 2007

- Episode 2: Polar Plunge

Original Air Date: January 4, 2007

- Episode 3: Testicle Weightlifting

Original Air Date: January 18, 2007

- Episode 4: Log Boxing

Original Air Date: January 25, 2007

- Episode 5: Taser

Original Air Date: February 2, 2007

- Episode 6: Stripper Dodgeball

Original Air Date: February 9, 2007

- Episode 7: Tony Hawk Tag Team

Original Air Date: February 16, 2007

- Episode 8: Harley Hotdog

Original Air Date: April 5, 2007

- Episode 9: Peanut Butter Paintball

Original Air Date: April 12, 2007

- Episode 10: Pudding Wrestling: Christy Hemme guests

Original Air Date: April 19, 2007

- Episode 11: Hip Hop Snowmobile

Original Air Date: April 26, 2007

- Episode 12: Rampage Jackson

Original Air Date: May 3, 2007

- Episode 13: Amateur Pole Dancing/Porn Star Bowling (featuring Glee star Naya Rivera, who was 20 years old at the time)

Original Air Date: May 10, 2007

- Episode 14: Anti-Ninja Training

Original Air Date: May 17, 2007
