= James McNair =

American comedian and writer

- McNair in the 2010s
- Born: Peekskill, New York, U.S.
- Died: June 7, 2014; Cranbury, New Jersey, U.S.
- Other names: Jimmy Mack; Uncle Jimmy Mack
- Occupations: Comedian; writer
- Spouse: Deneen
- Children: 2

James McNair (known by his stage names Jimmy Mack and Uncle Jimmy Mack) was an American comedian and writer.

== Career ==
Early in his career, McNair worked a number of jobs, including caseworker at a homeless shelter. He also worked to help those in his neighborhood, holding frequent fundraisers and serving food at a local Salvation Army shelter. The Peekskill, N.Y., native was well known in his community where he was often seen volunteering at his local church or playing host to The Original Uncle Jimmy Mack's Amateur Hour, a recurring fundraising event that helped to showcase local comedic talent.

McNair left the construction industry to pursue comedy, an effort that was grueling and paid little; but did put him in touch with other aspiring entertainers at, among other places, the Uptown Comedy Club in Harlem where he would meet Tracy Morgan. When Morgan later joined the cast of Saturday Night Live, McNair would often write sketches and material for the show in a freelance capacity. He was traveling with the comedy troupe the night of his death to aid with the writing for Morgan's "Turn it Funny" comedy stand-up tour.

== Mentorship ==
According to the New York Daily News, McNair was a close friend and mentor to Morgan. Morgan's former wife, Sabina Morgan, noted that the two "were very close," calling McNair "...one of the first comedians that took Tracy under his wing."

Royale Watkins, a fellow comedian and contemporary of both McNair and Morgan, said in an interview, "There may be guys like Tracy who get the fame and notoriety, but you have people like Jimmy Mack who have kind of energized and fueled cats like Tracy and kept them going on the road."

== Death ==
On June 7, 2014, McNair was killed at the age of 62 in a six-vehicle accident in New Jersey. McNair was a passenger in a limousine traveling northbound, north of Trenton, New Jersey, on the New Jersey Turnpike, just after 1:00 AM EDT, when the limo bus was struck from behind by a Walmart-operated tractor-trailer, causing a chain reaction crash. The group was returning from a show at the Dover Downs Hotel & Casino in Dover, Delaware. Three others, Ardie Fuqua, Jeffrey Millea, and actor/comedian Tracy Morgan, were injured in the crash. On July 10, 2014, Morgan and the other two passengers filed a lawsuit against Walmart, alleging the driver of the firm's tractor-trailer had not slept for 24 hours before the crash.

He was buried at Hillside Cemetery in Cortlandt Manor, Westchester County, New York.
