= Byron Allen =

American businessman and comedian (born 1961)

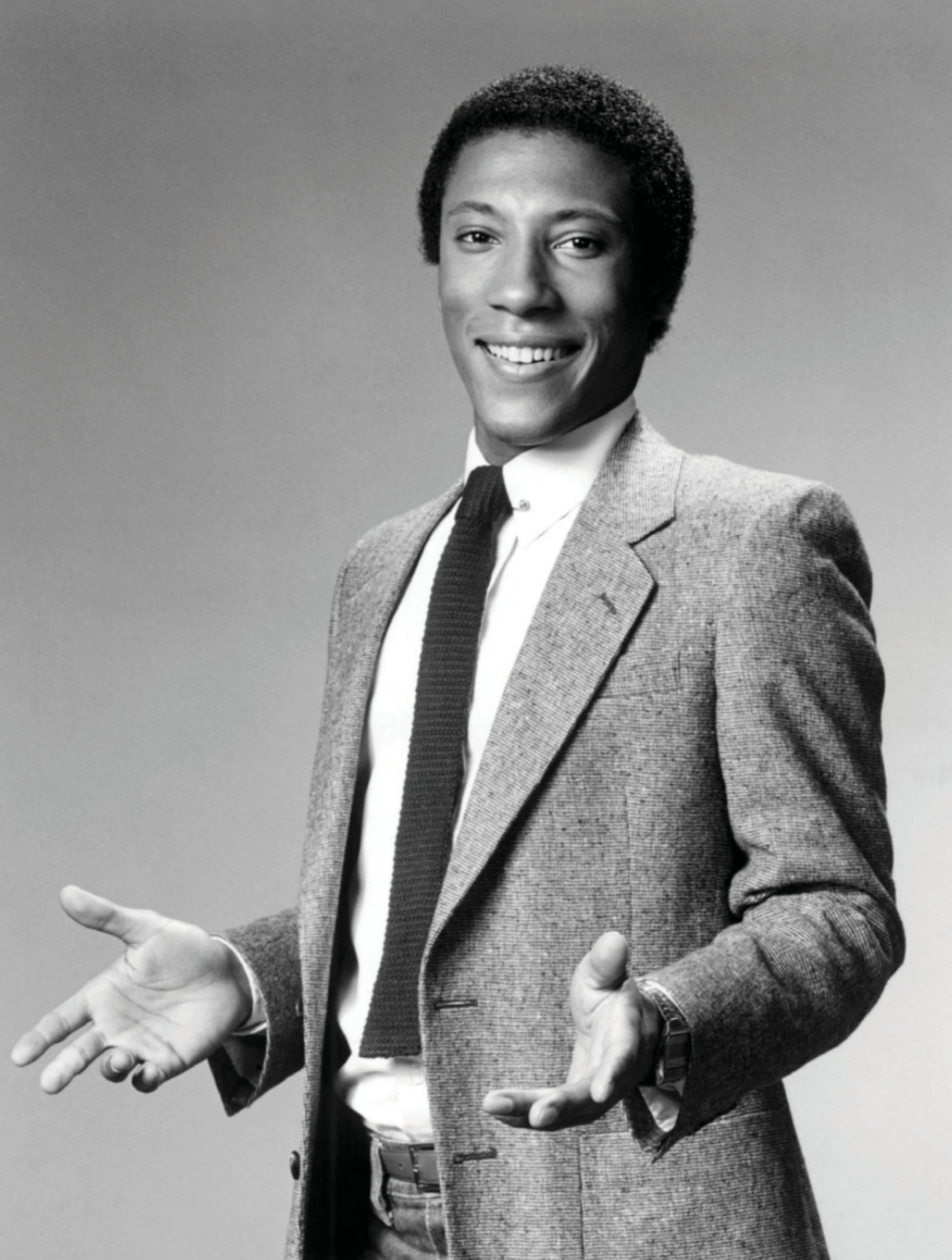
- Allen in 1982
- Born: Byron Allen Folks; April 22, 1961 (age 65); Detroit, Michigan, US
- Occupations: Comedian; media executive
- Employer(s): Allen Media Group; BuzzFeed
- Spouse: Jennifer Lucas (m. 2007)
- Children: 3
- Education: University of Southern California

Comedy career
- Years active: 1975–present
- Medium: Stand-up; television
- Genre: Observational comedy
- Subjects: American culture; everyday life

Byron Allen Folks (born April 22, 1961), professionally known as Byron Allen, is an American businessman, film and television producer, television host and comedian. He is the founder of the American media company Allen Media Group (formerly Entertainment Studios), which has interests in television production, broadcasting, film production, and digital media. He is also chairman and chief executive officer of BuzzFeed, following his family office's acquisition of a majority stake in the company.

Allen initially pursued a career in stand-up comedy. After an appearance on The Tonight Show, he began to expand into television work, including co-hosting NBC's Real People (1979–1984). In 1993, Allen established what would later become known as the Allen Media Group. He currently hosts and produces Comics Unleashed and appears on and produces Funny You Should Ask. Allen has also hosted and produced Entertainers and Kickin' It.

== Early life ==
Allen was born in Detroit, Michigan, living there until 1968, when he moved to Los Angeles with his mother after her divorce. His interest in show business began during his childhood when he accompanied his mother, Carolyn Folks, to NBC Studios in Burbank where she worked as a publicist. With Folks, he often attended the taping of shows such as Chico and the Man, Sanford and Son, and The Tonight Show at 18. He often visited The Tonight Show's studio when it was empty, sitting at Johnny Carson's desk and pretending to host.

== Career ==
When comedian Gabe Kaplan was at NBC Studios for a Gladys Knight special, Allen visited his dressing room and asked him for advice on a career in comedy. Kaplan suggested that he visit The Comedy Store. At age 14, Allen put together his first stand-up routine (some of which originated from a spec script he had written for Sanford and Son), and began appearing on amateur night at comedy clubs throughout the Los Angeles area, including The Comedy Store and The Improv. Allen attended high school at Fairfax High School in Los Angeles and college at the University of Southern California.

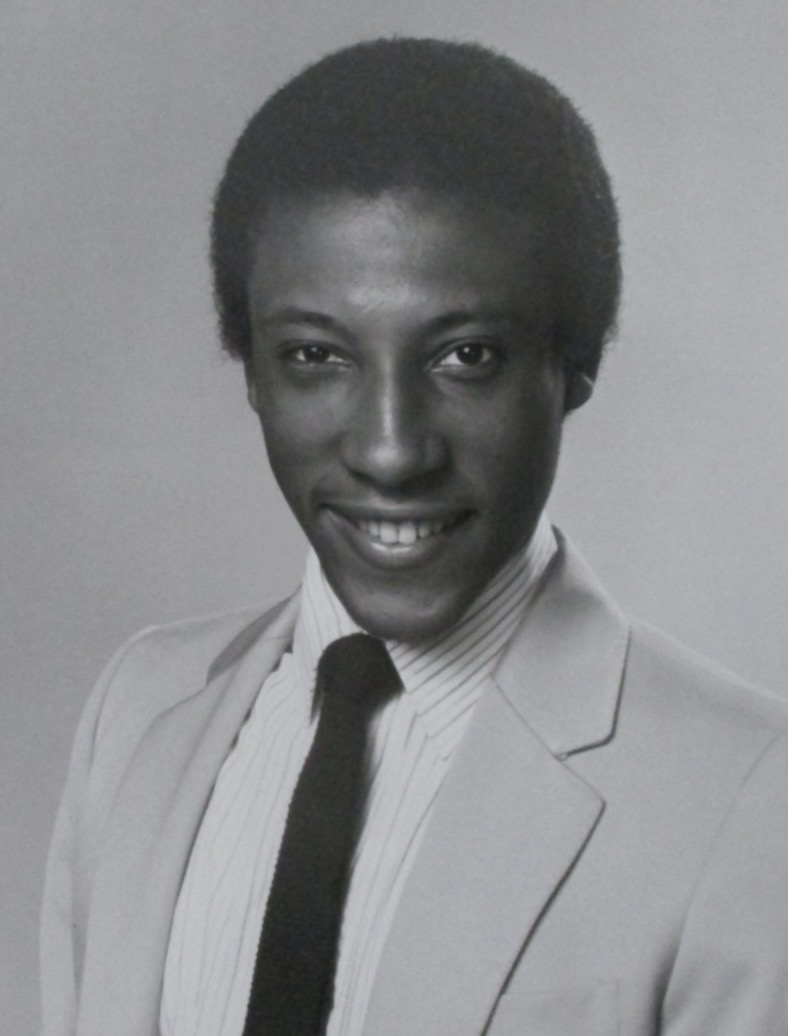
Allen in Real People, 1979

Comedian Jimmie Walker saw Allen's stand-up act and invited the 14-year-old comedian to join his writing team alongside promising young comedians Jay Leno and David Letterman. In 1979, at the age of 18, Allen made his television debut on The Tonight Show Starring Johnny Carson, becoming the youngest comedian to ever perform on the show. Following the appearance, Allen accepted an offer from NBC to become a co-host for Real People—his first role on a network prime time program. Allen co-wrote and co-starred in the 1988 CBS television film Case Closed, hosted the syndicated late-night talk show The Byron Allen Show from 1989 to 1992, and toured as an opening act for musicians such as Dolly Parton, Gladys Knight, Lionel Richie, and The Pointer Sisters.

Allen established BYCA Television Distribution in 1991 to distribute his talk show and syndicate other programs. The company subsequently entered Chapter 7 bankruptcy following lawsuits by former employees and an investor who alleged that they had not been paid.

In 1993, Allen established a production company known as CF Entertainment, which would be devoted to producing low-cost, non-fiction television programming; its first program would be the syndicated talk show Entertainers with Byron Allen, which featured Allen interviewing celebrities. The interviews were filmed at hotel press junkets for upcoming films, using equipment set up by their distributors for use by the media; this allowed Allen to produce the show on a relatively small budget. Allen distributed the program under a bartered model, in which it would be offered to stations at no cost, with revenue sharing on advertising sales. The business model was not initially successful, resulting in Allen's home facing multiple foreclosures, and at one point losing telephone service—requiring him to conduct business via a payphone.

The company was renamed Entertainment Studios in 2003, and later became the Allen Media Group with Entertainment Studios becoming the name of its production subsidiary. In 2012, Allen began forays into scripted programming with the sitcoms The First Family and Mr. Box Office. Later in the decade, Entertainment Studios began to pursue various acquisitions, including film distributor Freestyle Releasing, TheGrio, The Weather Channel, whose acquisition also included the streaming service Local Now, an equity stake in Sinclair Broadcast Group's acquisition of the Fox Sports Networks, and broadcast television stations. By October 2022, the company was valued at over $4.5 billion.

In July 2022, Allen Media Group acquired substantially all of the assets of the Black News Channel out of bankruptcy for $11 million. Its television assets and carriage agreements were subsequently integrated into TheGrio's network.

In February 2022, Allen made a bid to buy the Denver Broncos of the National Football League. Allen was ultimately outbid by a group led by S. Robson Walton.

In 2023, Allen had made an unsuccessful bid of about $3 billion for Paramount's BET Media Group.

Allen hosts and produces the syndicated comedy panel show Comics Unleashed (2006–present). In 2023, and again beginning in September 2025, the show was aired on CBS in the 12:35 a.m. late-night slot under a time buy arrangement whereby Allen's company bought airtime from CBS and sold commercial time to advertisers itself. Following CBS's cancellation of The Late Show with Stephen Colbert in May 2026, Comics Unleashed began airing in its 11:35 p.m. time slot, with Allen's Funny You Should Ask (2017–present) airing at 12:35 a.m. Under the arrangement, Allen Media Group agreed to pay CBS $15 million for the airtime while retaining most of the program's advertising inventory, which the company could sell to advertisers.

In 2024, Allen made a $14.3 billion offer to buy CBS and Paramount.

Allen Media Group agreed to sell ten of its television stations to Gray Media in August 2025 for $171 million. The transaction was completed in two stages, with the final seven stations transferred in May 2026.

In May 2026, Allen and his controlling company Allen Family Digital LLC announced an agreement to buy a controlling stake in BuzzFeed, Inc. for $120 million. BuzzFeed Founder and CEO Jonah Peretti will be succeeded by Byron Allen, who will assume the role of Chairman and Chief Executive Officer upon closing.

BuzzFeed announced plans in July 2026 to reduce its workforce by approximately 35%, affecting about 180 employees and contractors across BuzzFeed, HuffPost and Tasty. The restructuring was the first major workforce reduction under Allen's ownership.

== Awards ==
In 2018, Allen was selected for the Bloomberg 50 as one of "the people in business, entertainment, finance, politics, technology and science whose 2018 accomplishments were particularly noteworthy".

He was also selected for the 100 Most Intriguing Entrepreneurs at the Goldman Sachs Builders & Innovators Summit 2018, and he was honored by The Salvation Army and the Los Angeles Metropolitan advisory board at the Salvation Army's 11th annual Christmas Kettle luncheon.

In January 2019, Allen was a recipient of National Association of Television Program Executives's 16th Annual Brandon Tartikoff Legacy Awards, presented during the annual NATPE Miami Marketplace & Conference. Allen received the 2019 Whitney Young Award at the 46th annual Los Angeles Urban League Awards dinner.

In February 2023, the African American Student Union of the Harvard Business School presented Allen with its inaugural "Legendary Honor".

== Lawsuits ==
=== McDonald's ===
Allen filed a $10 billion lawsuit, in 2021, through his company, Allen Media Group. He alleged the McDonald's hamburger chain discriminated against Black-owned media companies in its TV advertising budget. Allen's suit said that McDonald's practice of buying ad time on media outlets that target Black viewers was discriminatory because those purchases were made from a budget set aside for what the complaint described as "the African American tier" of outlets and was damaging to Black media owners because that tier had more limited funds available than the general tier that the company used for broader audiences on major networks and platforms.

The case was settled out of court in 2025.

=== Comcast ===
Allen and the National Association of African American-Owned Media sued Comcast in 2015, alleging that the cable company had refused to carry Allen's television networks because of racial discrimination. The U.S. Supreme Court unanimously ruled in March 2020 that plaintiffs bringing claims under Section 1981 must demonstrate that race was a but-for cause of the alleged injury, vacating the lower court's decision. Allen and Comcast reached a settlement in June 2020 under which Comcast agreed to carry three of Allen's networks: Comedy.TV, Recipe.TV and JusticeCentral.TV.

== Personal life ==
Allen married TV producer Jennifer Lucas in 2007. The couple has three children. Allen is on the Motion Picture & Television Fund Board of Governors.

Allen has residences in Aspen, Colorado; Maui, Hawaii; Los Angeles; and New York City. In 2022, he bought a two-home compound in Beverly Hills, California, from Jeffrey Skoll for $22 million, and a mansion in Malibu, California, previously owned by Tamara Gustavson for $100 million.

== Filmography ==
=== Television ===
Year	Title	Role	Notes
1979	Hollywood Squares	Himself/Panelist	4 episodes
1979—1984	Real People	Himself	Multiple episodes
1980	The Alan Thicke Show	Himself	2 episodes
1982	The Merv Griffin Show	Himself	Season 20, episode 24
1988	Case Closed	Detective David Brockman	Television film
1989—1992	The Byron Allen Show	Himself	Main role
2006–2016, 2025–present	Comics Unleashed	Himself/Host	Main role
2013	The First Family	Johnny	Episode: "The First Pageant"
2017–present	Funny You Should Ask	Himself/Panelist	Main role
2024	Bel-Air	Himself	Episode: "Pivot"

=== Film ===
Year	Title	Role	Notes
2001	America's Sweethearts	Himself	

== Crew work ==
- 47 Meters Down – Executive producer
- 47 Meters Down: Uncaged – Executive producer
- Arctic Dogs – Executive producer
- Case Closed – Co-executive producer
- Comics Unleashed – Creator, executive producer, host
- Funny You Should Ask – Creator, executive producer, panel
- The Hurricane Heist – Executive producer
- The World's Funniest Weather – Creator, executive producer
