= Getting Doug with High =

Interview podcast

- Genre: Comedy
- Created by: Doug Benson
- Country of origin: United States
- Original language: English
- No. of seasons: 1
- No. of episodes: 258

Production
- Production locations: Los Angeles, California
- Running time: 45–60 minutes

Original release
- Network: Video Podcast Network
- Release: October 2, 2013 – February 8, 2020

Getting Doug With High is a video and audio podcast hosted by American stand-up comedian and actor Doug Benson.

Guests are interviewed while smoking marijuana alongside Benson. Each episode features different strains of sativa and indica, and showcases a series of smoking implements of unusual design, often including pipes designed by Chameleon Glass.

The show features several recurring segments:

- High History—The guests talk about the first time they ever smoked marijuana
- Pot Topics—Doug talks about news related to cannabis, with a particular focus on which states have legalized and/or decriminalized marijuana or are close to passing a legislative or ballot initiative to do so.
- Pot Quiz Hop Shot—Doug asks the guests a series of cannabis-related trivia questions.
- #HeavyMonkey—Doug tries to get one of the guests to comment about the weight of a broken lighter shaped like a monkey.
- Gabe Time (now canceled)—To close out the show, Doug brings out magician Gabe Dylan to perform a magic trick for the guest, who by this point is usually very high.

In 2016, Benson hosted an uninterrupted four hour and twenty minute version of the show at a festival hosted by Jash in Palm Springs, California. The show has also hosted live versions of the show, with several guests, in front of an audience in a theater.

During the show that aired December 27, 2019, Benson noted that the show would be on hiatus.

== Cast ==
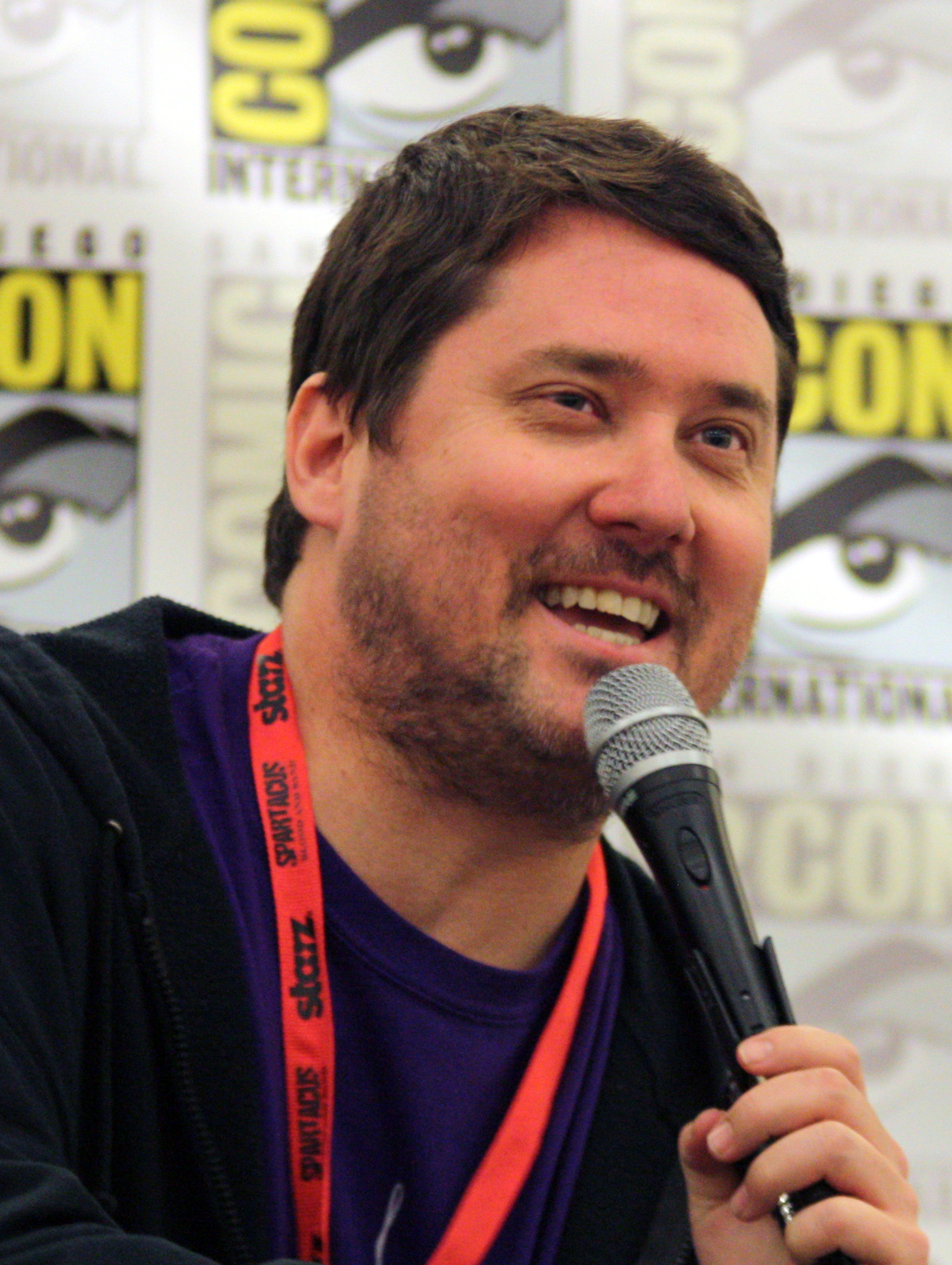
Benson at San Diego Comic-Con, 2009

- Doug Benson - Host

Frequently appearing

- Gabe Dylan
- Alicia Glass
- Taylor Rizzo

== Episodes ==
Date	Guest(s)	Notes
October 2, 2013	Jenny Slate	
October 9, 2013	Jeff Ross	
October 16, 2013	Anthony Jeselnik	
October 23, 2013	Greg Proops	
October 30, 2013	Eric André	
November 6, 2013	Sarah Silverman & Todd Glass	
November 13, 2013	James Adomian	
November 20, 2013	Aubrey Plaza & Alia Shawkat	
December 4, 2013	Natasha Leggero	
December 11, 2013	Joey Diaz	
December 18, 2013	Kassem G	
January 8, 2014	Matt Besser & Howard Kremer	
January 16, 2014	Ari Shaffir	
January 24, 2014	Brian Redban, Tony Hinchcliffe & Comic Patriot	
January 28, 2014	Steve Agee, Eric André, Jonah Ray, Rory Scovel & Harris Wittels	Live from Largo
January 30, 2014	Kelly Carlin & Paul Provenza	
February 6, 2014	Josh Wolf & Ron Funches	
February 13, 2014	Reggie Watts, Ilana Glazer & Abbi Jacobson	
February 20, 2014	Geoff Tate, Jacob Sirof, Riki Lindhome, Greg Proops & Matt Besser	Live from Largo
February 20, 2014	Kyle Kinane, Tommy Chong	
February 27, 2014	Brendon Walsh & Geoff Tate	
March 6, 2014	Matt Walsh	Matt Walsh requested this episode be taken down
March 12, 2014	Big Jay Oakerson	
March 19, 2014	Todd Glass, Ari Shaffir, Brendon Walsh, Josh Wolf & Joey CoCo Diaz	Live From Largo
March 19, 2014	Adam DeVine, Blake Anderson & Anders Holm	
March 26, 2014	David Cross	
April 2, 2014	Horatio Sanz	
April 9, 2014	Dominic Monaghan	
April 16, 2014	Ngaio Bealum	
April 30, 2014	Gabe Dylan	
May 7, 2014	Jimmy Dore	
May 14, 2014	Jay Chandrasekhar	
May 21, 2014	Shane Mauss	
May 28, 2014	Morgan Murphy & Todd Glass	
June 11, 2014	Jason Ellis & Sam Tripoli	
June 18, 2014	Dan Harmon & Steve Agee	
June 25, 2014	Wil Anderson & Gary Gulman	
July 2, 2014	Sarah Silverman, Howard Kremer, Ngaio Bealum, Dan Harmon & James Adomian	Live From Largo. Originally aired live on June 23, 2014
July 9, 2014	Matt Braunger & Jim Jefferies	
July 14, 2014	Jay Chandrasekhar, Pete Holmes, Jerry Minor, John Roy & Horatio Sanz	Live From Largo
July 16, 2014	Eddie Ifft & Brad Williams	YouTube video is "Private", and the episode was also removed from iTunes.
August 6, 2014	Todd Glass	
August 13, 2014	Brendon Small & Kurt Braunohler	
August 20, 2014	Doug Stanhope	"Wake and Bake" episode
August 27, 2014	Andy Richter & Matt Besser	
September 4, 2014	Trailer Park Boys	
September 10, 2014	Margaret Cho & Shooter Jennings	
September 17, 2014	Kevin Smith & Brian Posehn	
September 28, 2014	Jack Black	
September 28, 2014	Cheech Marin & Tommy Chong	Tommy Chong did not consume any cannabis this episode while he was on Dancing with the Stars.
October 1, 2014	Steve Byrne & Chris Porter	Steve Byrne did not consume any cannabis in the episode.
October 15, 2014	Kassem G & Nick Rutherford	
October 22, 2014	Kyle Kinane & Justin Willman	
October 29, 2014	Kevin Weisman	
November 5, 2014	Jon Daly & Zack Pearlman	
November 12, 2014	Michael Ian Black & Greg Proops	
November 19, 2014	Bonnie Rotten & John Roy	
November 24, 2014	Tommy Chong, Kassem G, Ron Funches, Megan Neuringer & Eddie Ifft	Live From Largo
December 10, 2014	Cameron Esposito & Ngaio Bealum	Missing from YouTube and iTunes. Issue unaddressed by show.
December 16, 2014	Ralphie May & Jon Reep	
January 5, 2015	Filip Hammar, Fredrik Wikingsson & Ngaio Bealum	
January 7, 2015	Joey CoCo Diaz & Esther Ku	
January 12, 2015	Ari Shaffir & Adam Carolla	
January 20, 2015	Lucas Brothers & Kassem G	
January 28, 2015	Todd Glass & Emily Heller	
February 3, 2015	Wendy Liebman & Ron Funches	
February 10, 2015	Josh Wolf & Danny Tamberelli	
February 17, 2015	Greg Proops & P-Nut	
March 3, 2015	Sarah Silverman, Todd Glass, Eric André, Brian Posehn & Rory Scovel	Live From Largo
March 4, 2015	Felipe Esparza & Josh Blue	
March 12, 2015	Chris Robinson, Farmer Dave Scher & Zack Pearlman	
March 23, 2015	Baron Vaughn & Fred Stoller	
April 7, 2015	Jay Chandrasekhar, Lahna Turner & Ralphie May	
April 19, 2015	Todd Glass, Greg Proops, Megan Neuringer, Chris Porter & Daniel Kinno	Live From UCB Theatre
April 23, 2015	Beth Stelling, Roy Choi & Horatio Sanz	
May 12, 2015	Pete Holmes	
May 21, 2015	Morgan Murphy & Daniel Kellison	
May 29, 2015	Brooks Wheelan, Todd Glass & Ngaio Bealum	
June 15, 2015	Rob Cantrell & Chris Cubas	
June 21, 2015	The Lucas Bros, Geoff Tate, Morgan Murphy & Pete Holmes	
June 23, 2015	Esther Ku & B-Real	
July 1, 2015	Jade Catta-Preta, Margaret Cho & Nick Rutherford	
July 27, 2015	Doug Benson	
July 18, 2015	Owen Benjamin & Craig Robinson	
July 25, 2015	Sara Schaefer & Larry Charles	
July 31, 2015	Daryl Sabara & John Roy	
September 8, 2015	Riki Lindhome, Ron Funches, Brooks Wheelan, Sean O'Connor & Gabe Dylan	
September 18, 2015	Kimberly Congdon, Todd Glass & Michael McDonald	
September 21, 2015	Doug Benson	
October 6, 2015	Brian Redban & Felipe Esparza	
October 12, 2015	Doug Benson	
October 19, 2015	Jacob Sirof & Jon Gabrus	
October 23, 2015	Janice Griffith & Kassem G	
October 26, 2015	Sara Weinshenk & Tony Hinchcliffe	
November 4, 2015	Trey Galyon & Greg Proops	
November 14, 2015	Joe Pettis & Zack Pearlman	
November 24, 2015	Adam Pally	
December 1, 2015	Brian Posehn	
December 8, 2015	Tom Rhodes & Josh Wolf	
December 15, 2015	Whitney Cummings & Esther Ku	
January 8, 2016	Lee Syatt & Joey Coco Diaz	
January 14, 2016	April O'Neil & Janice Griffith	
January 18, 2016	Doug Benson	
January 29, 2016	John DiMaggio & Open Mike Eagle	
February 4, 2016	Steve Rannazzisi	
February 18, 2016	Esther Ku & Bree Essrig	
February 22, 2016	Geoff Tate, Brandon Wardell & Ron Funches	
February 29, 2016	Bonnie McFarlane & Todd Glass	
March 8, 2016	Steel Panther & Kassem G	
March 21, 2016	P-Nut & Ari Shaffir	
March 24, 2016	Peaches & Ngaio Bealum	
March 31, 2016	Kimberly Congdon & Mark Normand	
April 2, 2016	Kassem G, Matt Besser, Brandon Wardell	Special 4h20m Live from JASH Fesht Show
April 5, 2016	Tiffany Haddish & Simon Rex	
April 15, 2016	Doug Benson	
April 20, 2016	Geoff Tate, Rory Scovel, Todd Glass, Josh Wolf, Open Mike Eagle	4/20 special live from Alex Theatre in Glendale, CA
May 2, 2016	Ron White & Josh Blue	
May 11, 2016	Geoff Tate, Todd Glass, Kassem G & Josh Blue	Live in Denver
May 17, 2016	Taylor Rizzo & Kassem G	
May 24, 2016	Esther Ku, Kimberly Congdon & Sarah Weinshenk	
June 6, 2016	Asher Roth, Brandon Wardell & Ngaio Bealum	
June 13, 2016	Riki Lindhome & Jay Oakerson	
June 21, 2016	Janice Griffith & Ramon Rivas II	Alt Title: "Good Day Worthless Heckler"
June 28, 2016	Taylor Rizzo & Greg Proops	Alt Title: "Giant Doobies Will Help"
July 12, 2016	Jessimae Peluso & Birdcloud	Alt Title: "Groundhogs Day Was Hilarious"
July 24, 2016	Melissa Moore & Esther Ku	Alt Title: "God's Dank Weed Heaven"
August 11, 2016	Jessimae Peluso, Karlous Miller & Adam Ray	
August 16, 2016	Riley Reid, Quincy Jones & Taylor Rizzo	Alt Title: "Good Dabs Wreck Heads"
August 25, 2016	Doug Benson	
August 31, 2016	Eric André & Sklar Brothers	
September 9, 2016	Joe Lynch, Todd Glass & P-Nut	Alt Title: "Gina Davis Was Here"
September 13, 2016	Jade Catta-Preta, Andrew Santino & Jacob Sirof	Alt Title: "Great Dan's Want Herb"
September 22, 2016	Janice Griffith, Todd Robert Anderson & Rick Glassman	Alt Title: "Gabe Dillon's Wizard Hour"
October 12, 2016	Jessimae Peluso & Melissa Etheridge	Alt Title: "Gestures Don't Work Here"
October 19, 2016	Birdcloud & Todd Glass	Alt Title: "Grandpa Doesn't Wash Himself"
November 1, 2016	Tiffany Haddish, Ahmed Bharoocha & Kassem G	Alt Title: "Gremlins Don't Want Hummus"
November 10, 2016	Riley Reid, Joey Bada$$ & Jonny Shipes	Alt Title: "Got Donald Wanted Hillary"
November 15, 2016	Trey Galyon, Dustin "Duddy" Bushnell & Slink Johnson	Alt Title: "Gigantic Door We Handle"
November 22, 2016	Geoff Tate	Alt Title: "Gregg's Doppleganger Went Haywire"
November 30, 2016	Pete Holmes, Brandon Wardell, Tiffany Haddish, Sara Weinshenk & Tony Hinchcliffe	Live in West Hollywood, CA at the Troubadour.
December 13, 2016	Matt Jones & Zack Pearlman	Alt Title: "Glorious Debauchery Will Heal"
January 4, 2017	Big Jay Oakerson & Jeff Ross	Alt Title: "Great Days Warrant Hash"
January 12, 2017	Chris Franjola & Scott Thompson	Alt Title: "Gabe Deceives With Hijinks"
January 25, 2017	Esther Ku, Jay Washington & Geoff Tate	Alt Title: "Goths Don't Want Hugs"
February 1, 2017	Sara Weinshenk, P-Nut & Joe DeRosa	
February 9, 2017	Andy Kindler & Greg Proops	Alt Title: "Great Danes Wear Hats". Last episode with Gabe
February 20, 2017	Rosa Salazar & Adam Pally	Alt Title: "Giant Doses Won't Hurt"
February 24, 2017	Taylor Rizzo, Kimberly Congdon, John Levenstein, Slink Johnson, Sara Weinshenk, Geoff Tate, Virginia Collins, Jessimae Peluso, Matt Jones, Janice Griffith, Esther Ku, P-Nut	The 6 Hour Bong-a-Thon
March 7, 2017	Katie Morgan & Tiffany Haddish	Alt Title: "Great Dudes Wonderful Hallucinogens"
March 22, 2017	Brandon Wardell, Todd Glass & Slink Johnson	Alt Title: "Grizzlies Devour Whole Humans"
March 27, 2017	Josh Wolf & Ben Gleib	Alt Title: "Garage Doors Weirdly Hum"
April 11, 2017	Chloe Dykstra & Joey Coco Diaz	Alt Title: "Got Draded while Hallucinating"
April 17, 2017	Riley Reid & EpicLLOYD	Alt Title: "Good Dudes Wave Hello"
April 20, 2017	Esther Ku, Taylor Rizzo, Jacob Sirof, Felipe Esparza & Josh Ransdell	4/20 Show! Live in San Juan Capistrano, CA at the Coach House
May 2, 2017	Jessimae Peluso & The Lucas Bros	Alt Title: "Gotta Dance When Happy"
May 9, 2017	Sam Jay, Jeff Grace & Alex Karpovsky	Alt Title: "Groot Definitely Wins Hearts"
May 17, 2017	Ron Funches, Sean "X-Pac" Waltman & Chris Cubas	Alt Title: "Got Dank Wanna Hang"
May 23, 2017	Alexi Wasser, Abdullah Saeed & Jade Catta-Preta	
June 12, 2017	Jenna Sativa & Todd Glass	Alt Title: "Galant Dudes With Herbs"
July 12, 2017	Riley Reid, Gina Valentina & Taylor Rizzo	Alt Title: "Given Danger Wear Heals"
July 17, 2017	Jessimae Peluso & Eddie Ifft	Alt Title: "Gerba Derba Werba Herba"
August 7, 2017	Sen Dog & Tony Hinchcliffe	Alt Title: "Goats Deserve Washed Hands"
August 15, 2017	Brett Gelman & Action Bronson	Alt Title: "Gretchen Don't Want Ham"
August 29, 2017	Luis J. Gomez & Ron Funches	
September 6, 2017	Dan Soder & Ramon Rivas II	
September 11, 2017	Tom Thakkar & Ari Shaffir	
September 19, 2017	Trey Galyon & Jacob Sirof	
October 3, 2017	Lukas Nelson & Hampton Yount	
October 17, 2017	Erik Hoffstad & Todd Glass	
October 23, 2017	Ngaio Bealum & Jacob Sirof	
October 30, 2017	Bethany Cosentino & Jon Gabrus	
November 9, 2017	Jessimae Peluso & Tony Hinchcliffe	
November 13, 2017	Ian Karmel & Taylor Rizzo	
November 20, 2017	Todd Robert Anderson & Nick Rutherford	
December 5, 2017	Jamie Lee & John Levenstein	
December 11, 2017	Vince Averill & Joe DeRosa	
December 22, 2017	Pete Holmes & Omar Gharaibeh	
January 3, 2018	Dave Waite & Todd Glass	
January 16, 2018	Emma Arnold & Beth Stelling	
February 1, 2018	Rachel Wolfson & Geoff Tate	
February 3, 2018	Ron Funches, Riki Lindhome, Ian Karmel, Jessimae Peluso & Jade Catta-Preta	Live in West Hollywood, CA at the Troubadour
February 6, 2018	Janice Griffith & Josh Wolf	
February 27, 2018	Doug Benson	
March 5, 2018	Sofia Gonzalez, Steph Tolev & Ramon Rivas II	
March 19, 2018	Sara Weinshenk & Jacob Sirof	
April 2, 2018	Greg Proops & Vanessa Johnston	
April 20, 2018	Bree Essrig & Trevor Moore	
April 30, 2018	Keith Malley & Chemda	
May 14, 2018	Kate Quigley & Alison Rosen	First episode that Alicia Glass presents Pot Topics.
May 30, 2018	Adam Newman & Laganja Estranja	Geoff Tate shows up later in the show.
June 5, 2018	Reggie Watts & Kelly McInerney	
June 26, 2018	Mike Cannon & Kyle Kinane	
July 17, 2018	Gina Valentina & Dave Waite	
July 24, 2018	Natasha Leggero & Sara Weinshenk	
August 21, 2018	Meredith Salenger & Geoff Tate	
August 29, 2018	Baron Vaughn & Megan Gailey	
September 4, 2018	Billy Wayne Davis & Chris Porter	
September 19, 2018	Noel Leon & Taylor Rizzo	
September 25, 2018	Dave Ross & Slink Johnson	
October 3, 2018	Todd Glass	
October 9, 2018	Sen Dog & P-Nut	
October 17, 2018	Steph Tolev & Jon Dore	Canada Legalization Marathon
October 17, 2018	Dino Archie & Gavin Matts	Canada Legalization Marathon
October 17, 2018	Trailer Park Boys	Canada Legalization Marathon
October 17, 2018	Julia Hladkowicz & Matt O'Brien	Canada Legalization Marathon
October 29, 2018	Trey Galyon & Matt Jones	
November 6, 2018	Jade Catta-Preta & Justin Rupple	
November 13, 2018	Becky Robinson & Nick Rutherford	
November 20, 2018	Tommy Chong & Joe Lynch	
December 4, 2018	Bree Essrig & Ian Abramson	
December 11, 2018	Billy Wayne Davis & Noah Gardenswartz	
December 18, 2018	Nate Craig & Blair Socci	
December 25, 2018	Todd Robert Anderson, Allan McLeod & Stephen Falk	
January 9, 2019	Pete Holmes & Adrienne Airhart	
January 15, 2019	Jessimae Peluso & Joel Kim Booster	
January 29, 2019	Andy Kindler & J. Elvis Weinstein	
February 5, 2019	Citizen Cope & Ron Funches	
February 12, 2019	Tone Bell & Ben Gleib	
February 19, 2019	Roxy Striar & Sara Weinshenk	
February 26, 2019	EpicLLOYD & Nice Peter	Epic Rap Battles of History
March 5, 2019	Chris Porter & Geoff Tate	
March 19, 2019	Alison Becker & Jon Gabrus	
March 26, 2019	Tiffany Haddish & Eric Edelstein	
April 2, 2019	Open Mike Eagle & Baron Vaughn	
April 9, 2019	Carlisle Forrester & Matt Besser	
April 16, 2019	Vanessa Gonzalez & Billy Wayne Davis	
April 20, 2019	Doing Doug with Dabs 4/20 Special with Ramon Rivas	2019 4/20 Special
April 23, 2019	Lindsay Ames & Ramon Rivas II	
April 30, 2019	Box Brown & Larry Charles	
May 7, 2019	Kelly McInerney & Todd Glass	
May 14, 2019	Jade Catta-Preta & Todd Robert Anderson	
May 21, 2019	Jessimae Peluso & Eddie Ifft	
May 29, 2019	Dave Foley & Eric Edelstein	
June 4, 2019	Sara Weinshenk & Lukas Nelson	
June 11, 2019	Steph Tolev & Dan LaMorte	
June 18, 2019	Alison Rosen & John Levenstein	
June 26, 2019	Clare Grant & Josh Wolf	
July 2, 2019	Pete Holmes & Yogi Watts	
July 9, 2019	Ethan Edenburg & Johnny Pemberton	
July 16, 2019	Frank Castillo & Brian Moses	
July 23, 2019	Carmen Morales & Carlisle Forrester	
July 30, 2019	Rob Cantrell & Jon Gabrus	
August 6, 2019	Kelly McInerney & Andy Juett	
August 13, 2019	Todd Glass & Tony Camin	
August 20, 2019	Alison Rosen & Jeff Dye	
August 27, 2019	John DiMaggio & Eric Edelstein	
September 10, 2019	Justin Martindale & Ben Gleib	
September 17, 2019	Nick Turner & Ramon Rivas	
September 24, 2019	David Bienenstock & Abdullah Saeed	
October 1, 2019	Todd Glass & Matt Fernandez	
October 8, 2019	Jessimae Peluso & Daniel	
October 15, 2019	Dave Ross & Billy Wayne Davis	
October 22, 2019	Trey Galyon & Geoff Tate	
October 29, 2019	Bri Pruett & Ngaio Bealum	
November 5, 2019	Vanessa Johnston & Matt Besser	
November 12, 2019	Allen Strickland Williams & Simon Rex	
November 19, 2019	Jessimae Peluso & Vanessa Gonzalez	
November 26, 2019	Sara Weinshenk & Michael Malone	
December 3, 2019	Todd Glass	
December 10, 2019	Liza Treyger & Todd Glass	
December 21, 2019	Carlisle Forrester & Frank Castillo	
December 27, 2019	Josh Wolf & Jon Gabrus	Benson announces the show is going on hiatus.
