= Premium Blend =

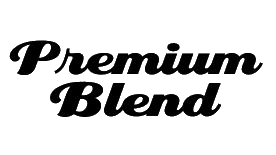
- Genre: Stand-up comedy
- Created by: Paul Miller
- Presented by: Kathy Griffin (1997); Jim Breuer (1998); Tommy Davidson (1999-2000); Harland Williams (2000-20001); David Alan Grier (2001); Wanda Sykes (2002-2003); D. L. Hughley (2003-2004); Jamie Kennedy (2004-05); Damon Wayans (2005-2006)
- Country of origin: United States
- Original language: English
- No. of seasons: 9
- No. of episodes: 97

Production
- Executive producers: Kimber Rickabaugh; Paul Miller
- Running time: approx. 23 minutes

Original release
- Network: Comedy Central
- Release: November 29, 1997 – January 27, 2006

Premium Blend was a stand-up comedy series created and directed by Paul Miller that aired on the American cable television channel Comedy Central from 1997 to 2005. In 2005, the show was changed and now known as "Live at Gotham".

The show was born out of Comedy Central's attempts to find new comedy stars. These "attempts" were $1,000 to $10,000 productions that allowed unnoticed comedians to share their material. Premium Blend acted as a showcase where most of the material and bits were shown.

== Overview ==
Every year since its premiere in 1997, the program featured a well-known stand up comedian as an emcee who introduced four or five lesser-known comedians looking for a big break on television. The host and guests would change every year. Each comedian presented a short set of jokes, which was edited to last about five minutes on the airing of the show.

Many performers have gone on to fame and success as comedians and comedic actors, including Ed Helms, Andy Samberg, Aziz Ansari, Chelsea Handler, Fred Armisen, BJ Novak, Craig Robinson, Daniel Tosh, Maria Bamford, Bill Burr, J.B. Smoove, Nick Swardson, Darrell Hammond, Wanda Sykes, Pete Holmes, Anthony Jeselnik, Martha Kelly, Jamie Kennedy, Tom Kenny, Frank Caliendo, Bobby Lee, Ron White, Eugene Mirman, Jeff Dunham, Gabriel Iglesias, Demetri Martin, Mario Cantone, Karen Kilgariff, Bert Kreischer, and W. Kamau Bell.

== Hosts ==
Each season, the show would get a new comedian to serve as host for each of the season's batch of episodes. The hosts were:

- Kathy Griffin (1997)
- Jim Breuer (1998)
- Tommy Davidson (1999–2000)
- Harland Williams (2000-20001)
- David Alan Grier (2001)
- Wanda Sykes (2002–2003) - Sykes was the first and only comedian to be one of the standups on Premium Blend before becoming a host, having guested on the season two premiere in 1998 before returning four years later as the season's host.
- D. L. Hughley (2003–2004)
- Jamie Kennedy (2004–2005)
- Damon Wayans (2005–2006)

== Series overview ==
Series	Episodes	Originally released	
Series	Episodes	First released	Last released
1	5	29 November 1997	27 December 1997
2	8	23 May 1998	5 September 1998
3	12	7 December 1999	22 February 2000
4	12	4 December 2000	9 February 2001
5	12	5 October 2001	28 December 2001
6	12	26 October 2002	24 January 2003
7	12	28 November 2003	23 January 2004
8	12	19 November 2004	8 April 2005
9	12	11 November 2005	27 January 2006

== Episodes ==
=== Season 1 (1997) ===
No. overall	No. in season	Performer	Original release date
1	1	Greg Fitzsimmons/Sue Murphy/Pablo Francisco/Dueling Bankheads	29 November 1997
2	2	Mario Cantone/Karen Kilgariff/Christopher Titus/Slovin & Allen	6 December 1997
3	3	Adam Ferrara/Sunda Croonquist/Arj Barker/Stephen Lynch	13 December 1997
4	4	Craig Anton/Cory Miller/Blaine Capatch/Lust Pollution	20 December 1997
5	5	Rob Paravonian/Sabrina Matthews/Greg Behrendt	27 December 1997

=== Season 2 (1998) ===
No. overall	No. in season	Performer	Original release date
6	1	Tom Kenny/Johnny Sanchez/Wanda Sykes-Hall/Mitch Hedberg/Victoria Jackson	23 May 1998
7	2	Darrell Hammond/Laura House/Pinataland	30 May 1998
8	3	Mitch Fatel/Peter Correale/Vernon Chatman/Sam and Emmy Laybourne	6 June 1998
9	4	Leanne Ford/Nick Swardson/Y'all	13 June 1998
10	5	Billy Burr/Ed Crasnick/Suli McCullough/Jen's Revenge	20 June 1998
11	6	Vanessa Hollingshead/Tom Papa/John Bush/Randy and Jason Sklar	27 June 1998
12	7	Steve Marmel/Jackie Kashian/Wali Collins/Muckafurgason	4 July 1998
13	8	Mark Pitta/John Henton/Paul F. Tompkins/Jason Kuller/Doug Stanhope/Betty	5 September 1998

=== Season 3 (1999-2000) ===
No. overall	No. in season	Performer	Original release date
14	1	Gary Valentine/Maria Bamford/Daniel Tosh/Craig Robinson	7 December 1999
15	2	Michael Loftus/Juston McKinney/John Rogers/Lust Pollution	14 December 1999
16	3	Renee Hicks/Tim Young/Peter Johansson/Scott Bloom	21 December 1999
17	4	Jeff Allen/Scott Henry/Frank Caliendo/The Chalks	28 December 1999
18	5	Gregg Rogell/Louis Ramey/Eric Drysdale/Sherry Davey	4 January 2000
19	6	Eric Kornfeld/Nick Griffin/Merrin Dungey/Jeff Dunham	11 January 2000
20	7	Tom Cotter/Andy Blitz/Penelope Lombard/Mario Cantone	18 January 2000
21	8	Phil Palisoul/Gabriel Iglesias/Dana Eagle/Tom Shillue	25 January 2000
22	9	Greg Hahn/Gary Gulman/Cory Kahaney/Regular Joe's	1 February 2000
23	10	Mike Ricca/Godfrey/Chris Rich/Paul Greenberg	8 February 2000
24	11	Jimmy Pardo/Dwayne Perkins/Leo Allen/Emmy Laybourne	15 February 2000
25	12	Matt Weinhold/Michael Estime/Retta	22 February 2000

=== Season 4 (2000–01) ===
No. overall	No. in season	Performer	Original release date
26	1	Ian Bagg/Lynne Koplitz/Jordan Rubin/Bobby Lee	4 December 2000
27	2	Vince Morris/Darren Carter/DeRay/Bill Larkin	11 December 2000
28	3	Candy Ford/Doug Benson/Chuck Roy/Jimmy Shubert	18 December 2000
29	4	David J. Nash/Mike B./Dina Pearlman/Anthony Szpak	25 December 2000
30	5	Demetri Martin/Corey Holcomb/Karen Bergreen/The Amazing Jonathan	1 January 2001
31	6	Happy Cole/Jamie Kennedy/Elizabeth Beckwith/Allan Wells	8 January 2001
32	7	Robert Hawkins/Russ Meneve/Marta Ravin/Dwayne Kennedy	12 January 2001
33	8	D.C. Benny/Eddie Ifft/Jen Kirkman/Mike Lukas	15 January 2001
34	9	Mark Gross/Wendy Spero/Dan Cronin/Tony Rock	19 January 2001
35	10	Dean Edwards/Andrew Kennedy/Kevin Bozeman/Jolly & Susan Messing	26 January 2001
36	11	Bert Kreischer/Tig/Tom Ryan/Earthquake	2 February 2001
37	12	Freddy Soto/Sarah Colonna/John Heffron/Rick Harris	9 February 2001

=== Season 5 (2001) ===
No. overall	No. in season	Performer	Original release date
38	1	Greer Barnes/Eddie Gossling/Sue Costello/Joey Kola	5 October 2001
39	2	Bryan Tucker/Sharon Houston/Billy Gardell/Fred Armisen	12 October 2001
40	3	Mike Birbiglia/Brody Stevens/Janine DiTullio/Billy D. Washington	19 October 2001
41	4	Jimmy Dore/Andrew Donnelly/Tess Drake/Rich Vos	26 October 2001
42	5	J. Scott Holman/Robert Kelly/Tracy Smith/Rudy Rush	2 November 2001
43	6	Scott Kennedy/Dan Naturman/Arnez J./Rob Paravonian	9 November 2001
44	7	Craig Baldo/Charlie Virracola/Chris Regan/Jim Norton	16 November 2001
45	8	Judah Friedlander/Laurie Kilmartin/Eugene Mirman/Patrice O'Neal	23 November 2001
46	9	Chris Hardwick/Sean Conroy/Leslie Charles/VanDeventer	30 November 2001
47	10	Mike MacRae/Jodie Wasserman/Christian Finnegan/Derrick Cameron	14 December 2001
48	11	Eric Kirschberger/Brian Keith Etheridge/Jason Andors/J.B. Smoove	21 December 2001
49	12	Jim Short/Liam McEneaney/Michael, Jr./Amy Barnes	28 December 2001

=== Season 6 (2002-03) ===
No. overall	No. in season	Performer	Original release date
50	1	Erin Foley/Jesse Popp/Sherrod Small/Hal Sparks	26 October 2002
51	2	Becky Donohue/Dan Gabriel/Ed Helms/Guy Torry	2 November 2002
52	3	Ben Bailey/Alonzo Bodden/Jonathan Corbett/Charlie Grandy	9 November 2002
53	4	Kyle Dunnigan/Aron Kader/Todd Lynn/Becky Pedigo	16 November 2002
54	5	Patrick Borelli/Reno Collier/Kareem Matthews/Tami Vernikoff	23 November 2002
55	6	Andre Kelley/Al Madrigal/Henry Phillips/Melanie Reno	7 December 2002
56	7	Winners from Laugh Riots: DeRay Davis/Martha Kelly/Robert Mac/Retta	14 December 2002
57	8	Steve Byrne/Jessica Kirson/Shawn Majumder/Alex Thomas	21 December 2002
58	9	Tony Camin/Bob Oschack/Stephanie Howard/Ron White	28 December 2002
59	10	Dwight Slade/Laura Swisher/Drew Hastings/Bob Marley	3 January 2003
60	11	Kyle Grooms/Danny Cohen/Robin Montague/Jeff Burghart	17 January 2003
61	12	Owen Smith/Greg Warren/Bridget Smith/Greg Morton	24 January 2003

=== Season 7 (2003-04) ===
No. overall	No. in season	Performer	Original release date
62	1	Darrell Joyce/Chris McGuire/Rylee Newton/Victor Varnado	28 November 2003
63	2	Amy Anderson/Anthony Griffith/Joe Matarese/Sean Rouse	5 December 2003
64	3	Lisa Gopman/James Patterson/Chris Fairbanks/Tom McCaffrey	12 December 2003
65	4	Roz G/Bill Santiago/John Mooney/KP Anderson	19 December 2003
66	5	Loni Love/Julius Sharpe/Kristeen von Hagen/Tom Clark	2 January 2004
67	6	BJ Novak/Avi Liberman/Heather Lawless/Donnell Rawlings	2 January 2004
68	7	J. Chris Newberg/Ty Barnett/Jessi Klein/Chip Pope	9 January 2004
69	8	Alexandra McHale/Eric Blake/Brian Kiley/Kevin Kataoka	9 January 2004
70	9	Sean Corvelle/Eddie Sarfaty/Jane Edith Wilson/Eliot Chang	16 January 2004
71	10	Marc Theobald/Pat Dixon/Howard Kremer/Danielle Koenig	16 January 2004
72	11	Megan Mooney/Cash Levy/Karith Foster/Sam Tripoli	23 January 2004
73	12	Finesse Mitchell/Rusty Ward/Bonnie McFarlane/Ant	23 January 2004

=== Season 8 (2004-05) ===
No. overall	No. in season	Performer	Original release date
74	1	Dov Davidoff/Kristian Vallee/Allison Castillo/Rodman	19 November 2004
75	2	Maz Jobrani/Matt Bearden/Rachel Feinstein/Jon Fisch	3 December 2004
76	3	Josh Sneed/Carmen Lynch/Peter Spruyt/Rodney Laney	10 December 2004
77	4	James Johann/Lavell Crawford/Debbie Shea/Andy Samberg	7 January 2005
78	5	Lowell Sanders/Nathan Trebholm/Lisa Landry/Jay Oakerson	14 January 2005
79	6	Butch Bradley/Adam Growe/Jasper Redd/Michele Biloon	21 January 2005
80	7	Dan Allen/Morgan Murphy/Kevin Seccia/Jimmie Roulette	28 January 2005
81	8	Alex Ortiz/Ophira Eisenberg/Matt Iseman/John Caparulo	4 February 2005
82	9	Jon Reep/Dan Mintz/Dennis Fowler/Lisa Lampanelli	4 March 2005
83	10	Isaac Witty/Marina Franklin/Boris Hamilton/Vickie Shaw	25 March 2005
84	11	Danny Bevins/Chelsea Handler/Hayes MacArthur/Doug Williams	1 April 2005
85	12	Mike Bentancourt/Rob Pue/Carmen Stockton/Joe Starr	8 April 2005

=== Season 9 (2005-06) ===
No. overall	No. in season	Performer	Original release date
86	1	Johnny Lampert/Natasha Leggero/Steve Rannazzisi/Roy Wood Jr.	11 November 2005
87	2	Chris Mata/Rich Williams/Pete Holmes/Rickey Smiley	18 November 2005
88	3	Michelle Buteau/Todd Levin/Sebastian/Michael Somerville	2 December 2005
89	4	Felipe Esparza/Val Kappa/Dan Levy/Kevin Shea	9 December 2005
90	5	John Roy/Gilson Lubin/Jim Hamilton/Kelly MacFarland	16 December 2005
91	6	David Huntsberger/Tracy Esposito/W. Kamau Bell/Pete Lee	23 December 2005
92	7	Dan Ahdoot/Mario DiGiorgio/Blair Butler/Kyle Cease	28 January 2005
93	8	Bret Ernst/Matt Goldich/Rhetha Jones/Bobby Miyamoto	6 January 2006
94	9	Rebecca Corry/Anthony Jeselnik/Jamie Lissow/Damon Williams	13 January 2006
95	10	Carlos Oscar/Rena Zager/Kevin Williams/Harris Stanton	20 January 2006
96	11	Joe De Rosa/Suzanne Whang/Prescott Tolk/Royale Watkins	27 January 2006
97	12	Frank Santorelli/Aziz Ansari/Brendon Walsh/Jo Koy	27 January 2006

== See also ==
- Comedy Central Presents
