= America's Top Dog =

American television series

- Intertitle since Season 2
- Genre: Reality; Dog show
- Directed by: Alex Van Wagner
- Presented by: David Koechner; Curt Menefee
- Starring: Rachel Bonnetta
- Country of origin: United States
- Original language: English
- No. of seasons: 3
- No. of episodes: 27

Production
- Executive producers: Dan Cesareo; Lucilla D’Agostino; Jordana Starr; Holly Wofford; Elaine Frontain Bryant; Shelly Tatro; Sean Gottlieb; Brad Holcman
- Production locations: Santa Clarita (Season 1); Simi Valley (Season 2 & 3)
- Cinematography: Marc Carter
- Editors: Tony Nigro; Bryan DeBlasio; Jamil Nelson; Sean Gill; Mark Hervey; David S. Tung
- Production company: Big Fish Entertainment

Original release
- Network: A&E
- Release: January 8, 2020 – present

Related
- Live PD

America's Top Dog is a television series that premiered on A&E in January 2020. The show is hosted by actor David Koechner and sportscaster Curt Menefee, while Rachel Bonnetta serves as the sideline reporter for the show. The first season was filmed at Sable Ranch in Santa Clarita. The second and third seasons were filmed back-to-back in Simi Valley.

== Format ==
=== Season 1 ===
In the show, five dogs and their handlers—usually four police K-9 teams and one civilian team—compete in a three-phase competition. The first phase, the Canine Combine, is an obstacle course that includes the car slalom (where the dogs jump in and out of cars), the fire escape (where the dogs pull down the doors to get to the next level), the high jump (where the dogs jump over walls, or in some cases, crawl under them), the rope bridge (where the dogs run across an unstable rope bridge), and the splashdown (where the dogs swim across a small pool to the finish). The fastest four dogs through the Combine advance to the next phase. The next phase is the Boneyard, a scent detection test, where the dogs try to find as many scented objects as possible (out of five), and alert their handlers to the find, in a maze of rooms in five minutes or less. For each dog's run, the scent used is whatever the dog is most familiar with. The two dogs that find the most objects (or that find them the fastest, in case of a tie) advance to the final phase. In the last phase, the Doghouse, the dogs and handlers make their way through a "house," including knocking down the door, climbing through the window into a spider-web of bungees, low-crawling, climbing boxes, running through a duct-work tunnel, breaching two doors (with the dog pulling the door open), and finally apprehending a "suspect," including taking him down and then releasing on command and returning to the handler. The dog that completes the phase the fastest wins the title of "America's Top Dog," $10,000, an additional $5,000 donated to the animal charity of their choice, and the opportunity to compete in the grand finale, which has a $25,000 prize.

=== Season 2 ===
Season Two features a new format, with dogs facing against each other in head-to-head matches across classes of working dogs, police K-9 dogs and "underdogs". The winners of the three classes then face off against each other, with the final winner receiving a $10,000 cash prize and a choice to donate $5,000 to an animal charity of their choice. The final contest features winners of the previous weeks going head-to-head for a cash prize of $25,000.

== Contestants and winners by episode ==
=== Season 1 ===
| Episode Number | Episode Name | Air Date | Dog Name | Handler Name |
|---|---|---|---|---|
| 1 | Raising the Woof | January 8, 2020 | Falco (winner) | Dave Cochran |
| 1 | Raising the Woof | January 8, 2020 | Dax | John Forlenza |
| 1 | Raising the Woof | January 8, 2020 | Maker | John Kuendig |
| 1 | Raising the Woof | January 8, 2020 | Duco | Nathaniel Anderson |
| 1 | Raising the Woof | January 8, 2020 | Maverick | Casey Skelton |
| 2 | The Fast and the Furriest | January 15, 2020 | Bear (winner) | Dan Rhoades |
| 2 | The Fast and the Furriest | January 15, 2020 | Kato | Charles Duvall |
| 2 | The Fast and the Furriest | January 15, 2020 | Bonito | Dawn Jauernik |
| 2 | The Fast and the Furriest | January 15, 2020 | Rocko | Stan Smith II |
| 2 | The Fast and the Furriest | January 15, 2020 | Duke | Ed Soares |
| 3 | Small Dog, Big Bite | January 22, 2020 | Minion (winner) | Amanda Caldron |
| 3 | Small Dog, Big Bite | January 22, 2020 | Murphy | Patrick Newbill |
| 3 | Small Dog, Big Bite | January 22, 2020 | Blitz | Randy Stein |
| 3 | Small Dog, Big Bite | January 22, 2020 | Skoot | Alexander Lindsay |
| 3 | Small Dog, Big Bite | January 22, 2020 | Demi | Jared Backey |
| 4 | Double Down on the Underdog | January 29, 2020 | Mattis (winner) | Mark Tappan |
| 4 | Double Down on the Underdog | January 29, 2020 | Fuze | Sarah Cole |
| 4 | Double Down on the Underdog | January 29, 2020 | Riddick | Amy Leishman |
| 4 | Double Down on the Underdog | January 29, 2020 | Wolverine | Otto Sturm |
| 4 | Double Down on the Underdog | January 29, 2020 | Moto | Jill Viggiani |
| 5 | Young Dog, Old Tricks | February 5, 2020 | Django (winner) | Heather Vanhemmert |
| 5 | Young Dog, Old Tricks | February 5, 2020 | Rico | Tim Bradley |
| 5 | Young Dog, Old Tricks | February 5, 2020 | Capo | Juan Rivera III |
| 5 | Young Dog, Old Tricks | February 5, 2020 | Leonittis | Alex Chavarin |
| 5 | Young Dog, Old Tricks | February 5, 2020 | Tango | Jordan Jones |
| 6 | Country Boys and Rescue Dogs | February 12, 2020 | Eddy (winner) | Todd Thompson |
| 6 | Country Boys and Rescue Dogs | February 12, 2020 | Cam | Justin Wilmot |
| 6 | Country Boys and Rescue Dogs | February 12, 2020 | Kuma | Michael Victorino |
| 6 | Country Boys and Rescue Dogs | February 12, 2020 | Jago | Mark Grube |
| 6 | Country Boys and Rescue Dogs | February 12, 2020 | Scrappy | Kristi Kummer |
| 7 | Are You Not Entertained? | February 19, 2020 | Bowie (winner) | Bob Schwarting |
| 7 | Are You Not Entertained? | February 19, 2020 | Pele | T.J. San Miguel |
| 7 | Are You Not Entertained? | February 19, 2020 | Crixus | John Shahor |
| 7 | Are You Not Entertained? | February 19, 2020 | Tater | Chuck Mehr |
| 7 | Are You Not Entertained? | February 19, 2020 | Bala | Daniel Salander |
| 8 | The Battle of the Garden State | February 26, 2020 | Kai (winner) | Mike McMahon |
| 8 | The Battle of the Garden State | February 26, 2020 | Hunter (Top Overall Boneyard Time) | Stan Balmer |
| 8 | The Battle of the Garden State | February 26, 2020 | Rogue | April Vaillancourt |
| 8 | The Battle of the Garden State | February 26, 2020 | Blizzard | Aaron Peterman |
| 8 | The Battle of the Garden State | February 26, 2020 | Mesa | Joseph Benke |
| 9 | Young Pups and Silver Foxes | March 4, 2020 | Bane (winner) | Jesse Matthews |
| 9 | Young Pups and Silver Foxes | March 4, 2020 | Kobe | Candice Snyder |
| 9 | Young Pups and Silver Foxes | March 4, 2020 | Kyra | Brian de los Santos |
| 9 | Young Pups and Silver Foxes | March 4, 2020 | Macie | Megan Devoe |
| 9 | Young Pups and Silver Foxes | March 4, 2020 | Bullet | Lance Montee |
| 10 | Gaga for Doggles | March 11, 2020 | Rony (winner) | Brad Larsen |
| 10 | Gaga for Doggles | March 11, 2020 | Simon | Michael Garber |
| 10 | Gaga for Doggles | March 11, 2020 | Casus Belli | Todd Mona |
| 10 | Gaga for Doggles | March 11, 2020 | Bruce | Sandy Reeves |
| 10 | Gaga for Doggles | March 11, 2020 | Garry | Aaron Steere |
| 11 | It Ain't Over Until There's a Top Dog | March 18, 2020 | Kai (winner) | Mike McMahon |
| 11 | It Ain't Over Until There's a Top Dog | March 18, 2020 | Mattis | Mark Tappan |
| 11 | It Ain't Over Until There's a Top Dog | March 18, 2020 | Rony | Brad Larsen |
| 11 | It Ain't Over Until There's a Top Dog | March 18, 2020 | Eddy | Todd Thompson |
| 11 | It Ain't Over Until There's a Top Dog | March 18, 2020 | Django | Heather Vanhemmert |
| 11 | It Ain't Over Until There's a Top Dog | March 18, 2020 | Falco | Dave Cochran |
| 11 | It Ain't Over Until There's a Top Dog | March 18, 2020 | Minion | Amanda Caldron |

=== Season 2 ===
| Episode Number | Episode Name | Air Date | Dog Name | Handler Name |
|---|---|---|---|---|
| 1 | Premiere Pooches | June 29, 2021 | Theo (winner) | Dayna Winter-Nolte |
| 1 | Premiere Pooches | June 29, 2021 | Krueger | Shea-La Gatz |
| 1 | Premiere Pooches | June 29, 2021 | Scar | Chris Don |
| 1 | Premiere Pooches | June 29, 2021 | Vader | Edgar Valencia |
| 1 | Premiere Pooches | June 29, 2021 | Monkey | Omar von Muller |
| 1 | Premiere Pooches | June 29, 2021 | Sue | Sara Chisnell |
| 2 | Cute But Means Business | June 29, 2021 | Chase (winner) | Mike Elezovic |
| 2 | Cute But Means Business | June 29, 2021 | Saint | Aolanis Fonseca |
| 2 | Cute But Means Business | June 29, 2021 | Frank | Alexa White |
| 2 | Cute But Means Business | June 29, 2021 | Rex | Chad Miller |
| 2 | Cute But Means Business | June 29, 2021 | Emit | Dana Rochat |
| 2 | Cute But Means Business | June 29, 2021 | Envy | Patricia Howell |
| 3 | Pulling A Fast One | July 6, 2021 | Capone (winner) | Danny Casson |
| 3 | Pulling A Fast One | July 6, 2021 | Rebel | Andrea Fergerson |
| 3 | Pulling A Fast One | July 6, 2021 | Mac | Allison Bilinski |
| 3 | Pulling A Fast One | July 6, 2021 | Quelle | Madison Sperry |
| 3 | Pulling A Fast One | July 6, 2021 | Creasy | Gary Pigott |
| 3 | Pulling A Fast One | July 6, 2021 | Magnus Ares | Sinead Mbaro |
| 4 | Beauty, Brains, and Bark | July 13, 2021 | Chase (winner) | Joey Burns |
| 4 | Beauty, Brains, and Bark | July 13, 2021 | Varro | Lisa Berry |
| 4 | Beauty, Brains, and Bark | July 13, 2021 | Murph | Chrissy Garzon |
| 4 | Beauty, Brains, and Bark | July 13, 2021 | Bonny | Kristine Hunter |
| 4 | Beauty, Brains, and Bark | July 13, 2021 | Envy | Sophia Kalfayan |
| 4 | Beauty, Brains, and Bark | July 13, 2021 | Kane | Whitney Ostrom |
| 5 | Tricks, Trials, and Takedowns | July 20, 2021 | Greymane (winner) | Cheyanne Green |
| 5 | Tricks, Trials, and Takedowns | July 20, 2021 | Knots | Andrea Reid |
| 5 | Tricks, Trials, and Takedowns | July 20, 2021 | Mattis | Adam Laprade |
| 5 | Tricks, Trials, and Takedowns | July 20, 2021 | Banner | Gary Herrero |
| 5 | Tricks, Trials, and Takedowns | July 20, 2021 | Niko | Allison Case |
| 5 | Tricks, Trials, and Takedowns | July 20, 2021 | Riot | Lauren Cabanaw |
| 6 | The Tall, the Brave, and the Engaged | July 27, 2021 | Chewy (winner) | Rachel Clark |
| 6 | The Tall, the Brave, and the Engaged | July 27, 2021 | Mina | Otto Sturm |
| 6 | The Tall, the Brave, and the Engaged | July 27, 2021 | JJ | Kristi Kummer |
| 6 | The Tall, the Brave, and the Engaged | July 27, 2021 | Puma | Ben Gatton |
| 6 | The Tall, the Brave, and the Engaged | July 27, 2021 | Mogan | Joseph Garcia |
| 6 | The Tall, the Brave, and the Engaged | July 27, 2021 | Demo | Chris Collier |
| 7 | The Comeback Dogs | August 3, 2021 | Creasy (winner) | Gary Pigott |
| 7 | The Comeback Dogs | August 3, 2021 | Saint | Aolanis Fonseca |
| 7 | The Comeback Dogs | August 3, 2021 | JJ | Kristi Kummer |
| 7 | The Comeback Dogs | August 3, 2021 | Niko | Allison Case |
| 7 | The Comeback Dogs | August 3, 2021 | Krueger | Shea-La Gatz |
| 7 | The Comeback Dogs | August 3, 2021 | Kane | Whitney Ostrom |
| 8 | Title Match to Top Them All | August 3, 2021 | Chase (winner) | Joey Burns |
| 8 | Title Match to Top Them All | August 3, 2021 | Chase | Mike Elezovic |
| 8 | Title Match to Top Them All | August 3, 2021 | Chewy | Rachel Clark |
| 8 | Title Match to Top Them All | August 3, 2021 | Greymane | Cheyanne Green |
| 8 | Title Match to Top Them All | August 3, 2021 | Capone | Danny Casson |
| 8 | Title Match to Top Them All | August 3, 2021 | Creasy | Gary Pigott |
| 8 | Title Match to Top Them All | August 3, 2021 | Theo | Dayna Winter-Nolte |

== Ratings ==
=== Season 1 (2020) ===
| No. | Title | Original air date | Rating (18-49) | Viewers (millions) |
|---|---|---|---|---|
| 1 | "Raising the Woof" | January 8, 2020 | 0.3 | 1.18 |
| 2 | "The Fast and the Furriest" | January 15, 2020 | 0.3 | 1.16 |
| 3 | "Small Dog, Big Bite" | January 22, 2020 | 0.3 | 0.86 |
| 4 | "Double Down on the Underdog" | January 29, 2020 | 0.2 | 0.87 |
| 5 | "Young Dog, Old Tricks" | February 5, 2020 | 0.2 | 0.87 |
| 6 | "Country Boys and Rescue Dogs" | February 12, 2020 | 0.2 | 0.63 |
| 7 | "Are You Not Entertained?" | February 19, 2020 | 0.2 | 0.62 |
| 8 | "The Battle of the Garden State" | February 26, 2020 | 0.2 | 0.63 |
| 9 | "Young Pups and Silver Foxes" | March 4, 2020 | 0.2 | 0.68 |
| 10 | "Gaga for Doggles" | March 11, 2020 | 0.2 | 0.57 |
| 11 | "It Ain't Over Until There's a Top Dog" | March 18, 2020 | 0.3 | 0.84 |

=== Season 2 (2021) ===
| No. | Title | Original air date | Rating (18-49) | Viewers (millions) |
|---|---|---|---|---|
| 1 | "Premiere Pooches" | June 29, 2021 | 0.1 | 0.39 |
| 2 | "Hometown Favorites" | June 29, 2021 | 0.1 | 0.41 |
| 3 | "Pulling a Fast One" | July 6, 2021 | 0.1 | 0.36 |
| 4 | "Beauty, Brains and Bark" | July 13, 2021 | — | — |
| 5 | "Tricks, Trials and Takedowns" | July 20, 2021 | 0.1 | 0.31 |
| 6 | "The Tall, the Brave and the Engaged" | July 27, 2021 | 0.1 | 0.36 |
| 7 | "The Comeback Dogs" | August 3, 2021 | 0.1 | 0.30 |
| 8 | "Title Match to Top Them All" | August 3, 2021 | 0.1 | 0.27 |

=== Season 3 (2021) ===
| No. | Title | Original air date | Rating (18-49) | Viewers (millions) |
|---|---|---|---|---|
| 1 | "New Season, New Dogs" | September 18, 2021 | 0.0 | 0.20 |
| 2 | "Can't Keep a Good Dog Down" | September 18, 2021 | 0.1 | 0.24 |
| 3 | "Off Course Canines" | September 18, 2021 | 0.0 | 0.21 |
| 4 | "Super Dogs" | September 18, 2021 | — | — |
| 5 | "Super Mutts and Super Sniffers" | September 25, 2021 | 0.0 | 0.19 |
| 6 | "Pound Pups to Top Dogs" | September 25, 2021 | — | — |
| 7 | "Redemption on the Line" | September 25, 2021 | — | — |
| 8 | "One Top Dog Left Standing" | September 25, 2021 | — | — |

== Remake ==
The German TV channel RTL acquired rights from A&E for remaking the show into a six-episode series titled Top Dog Germany (German: Der Beste Hund Deutschlands). It premiered on July 23, 2021.

== See also ==
- 2020 in American television
