= God's Pottery =

Comedy career
- Years active: 2005-Present
- Medium: Stand-up television
- Subject: Religion
- Members: Wilson Hall; Krister Johnson

God's Pottery is a New York City faux-Christian acoustic music and comedy duo. Its members are Wilson Hall (as "Jeremiah Smallchild") and Krister Johnson (as "Gideon Lamb"). They are both from New York City.

== Background ==
The duo often would just mess around and make up fake bands. While Hall was on vacation he came up with a Christian band idea and wrote some funny song titles. Before they knew it they were writing lyrics and began performing in rooms in downtown NYC.

== Career ==
Initially the idea was to goof around, but quickly comedians like Eugene Mirman and the Upright Citizens Brigade invited the duo to perform on their shows.

They made the act into an hour long show and traveled to Edinburgh Festival Fringe and signed with Mirman's manager.

The angle comedically was it was ludicrous, but there was no winking. We were always deeply in character. And we always took it seriously. — Krister Johnson

God's Pottery appeared on the sixth season of the NBC reality show Last Comic Standing. They were selected as semi-finalists in the New York City audition, then selected as finalists after a performance in Las Vegas, Nevada. They were eliminated along with Esther Ku in the first head-to-head elimination round on Episode 7, finishing in 12th place.

The duo released an EP from Comedy Central Records entitled Live at Comix in December 2007.

They also wrote the book What Would God's Pottery Do.
