= Surviving Paradise (TV series) =

British reality show

- Genre: Reality
- Presented by: Jessimae Peluso
- Country of origin: United Kingdom
- Original language: English
- No. of seasons: 1
- No. of episodes: 9

Production
- Executive producers: Tom Barry; Peter Campion; Tim Harcourt; Stephen Lambert; Nia Yemoh; Stephen Yemoh
- Production companies: Studio Lambert; Raw TV

Original release
- Network: Netflix
- Release: October 20, 2023

Surviving Paradise is a reality competition television series co-produced by All3Media’s Studio Lambert and Raw TV.

The show features 12 players who believe they're about to live it up for a summer at a beautiful villa. Instead, the players are almost immediately banished to the wilderness below it, where they'll have to survive on next to nothing. Stand-up comedian Jessimae Peluso hosts the competition.

== Format ==
Twelve contestants believe they're about to live it up for a summer at a beautiful villa, if they excel in challenges and secure strong alliances, they'll have a chance to compete for a $100,000 cash prize.

== Production ==
In October 2020, Deadline reported that Studio Lambert were casting for an ambitious reality game show, "which will fly contestants to a tropical location where they will commune and compete in a series of challenges and dilemmas in a bid to win a big cash prize". The series had the working title "Jet Set".

The series was officially announced in August 2022, with a new working title of "Edge of Paradise". The Evening Standard confirmed the "new survival reality series set in two contrasting worlds – a camp in the wilderness and a luxury villa".

== Release ==
Surviving Paradise premiered October 20, 2023, on Netflix.

== Contestants ==
Surviving Paradise Contestants
Name	Entered	Exited	Status
Linda Okoli	Episode 1	Episode 9	Winner
Shea Foster	Episode 1	Episode 9	Runner-up
Lellies Santiago	Episode 1	Episode 9	Third Place
Gabriel "Gabe" Dannenbring	Episode 5	Episode 9	Fourth Place
Hayley Smith-Rose	Episode 1	Episode 9	Eliminated
Alex Dourassof	Episode 1	Episode 9	Eliminated
Eva Desjardins	Episode 4	Episode 9	Eliminated
Copan Combs	Episode 1	Episode 9	Eliminated
Taylor Olympios	Episode 1	Episode 9	Eliminated
Justin Assada	Episode 1	Episode 9	Eliminated
Kelso Pierce	Episode 4	Episode 9	Eliminated
Aaron Chambers	Episode 1	Episode 8	Eliminated
Tabitha Sloane	Episode 1	Episode 7	Eliminated
Francisco "Sisco" Williams	Episode 1	Episode 6	Eliminated
Sarah Kate "SK" Reynolds	Episode 1	Episode 5	Eliminated

=== Future appearances ===
In 2024, Justin Assada appeared on the second season of Perfect Match.

In 2026, Justin Assada made his debut on Bravo’s ‘Southern Hospitality’

== Voting history ==
Contestant	Episode														
Contestant	1		2		3	4	5/6	6		7/8		8/9			9
Contestant	Outsiders	Insiders	Outsiders	Insiders	Outsiders	4	5/6	Insiders	Outsiders	Outsiders	Insiders	Insiders		Outsiders	9
Linda	Lellies	Not eligible	Not eligible	Sisco	Not eligible	Not eligible	Not eligible	Not eligible	Alex	Lellies	Not eligible	Linda to Move	Not eligible	Hayley to Eliminate	Winner
Shea	Taylor	Not eligible	Taylor	Not eligible	Hayley, Lellies, SK	Not eligible	Not eligible	Eva	Not eligible	Not eligible	Copan	Taylor to Move	Aaron	Not eligible	Runner-up
Lellies	Linda	Alex, Linda, Sisco	Not eligible	Linda	Hayley, Lellies, SK	Not eligible	Not eligible	Not eligible	Alex	Linda	Not eligible	Linda to Move	Aaron	Not eligible	Third Place
Gabe	Not in Game						Sisco to Eliminate	Not eligible	Alex	Won Place; Inside	Insider	Aaron to Move	Aaron	Not eligible	Fourth Place
Hayley	Aaron	Not eligible	Taylor	Not eligible	Hayley, Lellies, SK	Not eligible	Not eligible	Eva	Not eligible	Not eligible	Alex	Copan to Move	Aaron	Not eligible	Eliminated (Episode 9)
Alex	Lellies	Not eligible	Not eligible	Sisco	Not eligible	Not eligible	Not eligible	Not eligible	Alex	Not eligible	Copan	Not eligible	Not eligible	Not eligible	Eliminated (Episode 9)
Eva	Not in Game					Not eligible	Not eligible	Eva	Not eligible	Kelso	Not eligible	Not eligible	Not eligible	Alex to Eliminate	Eliminated (Episode 9)
Copan	Lellies	Not eligible	Tabitha	Not eligible	Hayley, Lellies, SK	Not eligible	Not eligible	Eva	Not eligible	Not eligible	Alex	Copan to Move	Not eligible	Eva to Eliminate	Eliminated (Episode 9)
Taylor	Sisco	Not eligible	Shea	Insider	Not eligible	Not eligible	Not eligible	Eva	Not eligible	Not eligible	Copan	Taylor to Move	Not eligible	Copan to Eliminate	Eliminated (Episode 9)
Justin	Tabitha	Not eligible	Tabitha	Not eligible	Hayley, Lellies, SK	Not eligible	Not eligible	Eva	Not eligible	Not eligible	Alex	Not eligible	Not eligible	Taylor to Eliminate	Eliminated (Episode 9)
Kelso	Not in Game					Not eligible	Not eligible	Not eligible	Alex	Linda	Not eligible	Not eligible	Not eligible	Justin to Eliminate	Eliminated (Episode 9)
Aaron	Tabitha	Not eligible	Tabitha	Not eligible	Hayley, Lellies, SK	Not eligible	Not eligible	Eva	Not eligible	Not eligible	Alex	Aaron to Move	Not eligible	Kelso to Eliminate	Eliminated (Episode 8)
Tabitha	Aaron	Not eligible	Copan	Insider	Not eligible	Not eligible	Not eligible	Not eligible	Alex	Eliminated (Episode 7)					
Sisco	Lellies	Not eligible	Not eligible	Linda	Hayley, Lellies, SK	Not eligible	Not eligible	Eliminated (Episode 6)							
SK	Justin	Not eligible	Tabitha	Not eligible	Hayley, Lellies, SK	Not eligible	Eliminated (Episode 5)								
Results	Lellies; 4 of 12 votes to Move Inside	Alex, Linda, Sisco; Lellies' choice to Move Inside	Tabitha; 4 of 8 votes to Move Inside	Tie	Lellies; Volunteered to Move; Outside	Lellies, Tabitha, Alex, Linda; Lost Place; Inside	Shea; Gabe's choice to Move Inside	Eva; Insider's choice to Move Outside	Alex; Outsider's choice to Move Inside	Tabitha; Eliminated by Challenge	Alex; 4 of 7 votes to Move Outside	Copan, Taylor, Linda, Aaron; Lost Place; Inside	Aaron; 4 of 4 votes to Eliminate	Kelso, Justin, Taylor, Copan, Eva, Alex, Hayley; Eliminated	Linda; 6 votes to win
Results	Lellies; 4 of 12 votes to Move Inside	Alex, Linda, Sisco; Lellies' choice to Move Inside	Taylor; 2 of 8 votes to Move Inside	Sisco; Insider's choice to Move Outside	Hayley, Lellies, SK; Outsiders choice to Move Inside	Eva, Copan, Sisco, Aaron, Justin; Won Place; Inside	Sisco; Eliminated by Gabe	Eva; Insider's choice to Move Outside	Alex; Outsider's choice to Move Inside	Linda; 2 of 4 votes to Move Inside	Justin; Alex's choice to Move Outside	Copan, Taylor, Linda, Aaron; Lost Place; Inside	Aaron; 4 of 4 votes to Eliminate	Kelso, Justin, Taylor, Copan, Eva, Alex, Hayley; Eliminated	Linda; 6 votes to win
Results	Lellies; 4 of 12 votes to Move Inside	Alex, Linda, Sisco; Lellies' choice to Move Inside	Taylor; 2 of 8 votes to Move Inside	Sisco; Insider's choice to Move Outside	Hayley, Lellies, SK; Outsiders choice to Move Inside	SK; Eliminated by Challenge	Sisco; Eliminated by Gabe	Eva; Insider's choice to Move Outside	Alex; Outsider's choice to Move Inside	Lellies; Linda's choice to Move Inside	Justin; Alex's choice to Move Outside	Copan, Taylor, Linda, Aaron; Lost Place; Inside	Aaron; 4 of 4 votes to Eliminate	Kelso, Justin, Taylor, Copan, Eva, Alex, Hayley; Eliminated	Shea; 4 votes to win
