= Eggimann =

Eggimann is a Swiss surname which is today mainly present in the Emmental region. Notable people with the surname include:

- Mario Eggimann (born 1981), Swiss footballer
- Oliver Eggimann (1919–2002), Swiss footballer
- Romy Eggimann (born 1995), Swiss ice hockey player

== See also ==
- Eggman (disambiguation)
