= Tattoo Redo =

Television show on Netflix

- Genre: Reality television
- Created by: Andrea Richter
- Starring: Jessimae Peluso; Tommy Montoya; Miryam Lumpini; Rose Hardy; Matt Beckerich; Twig Sparks
- Country of origin: United States
- Original language: English
- No. of seasons: 1
- No. of episodes: 6

Production
- Executive producers: Kevin Bartel; Jeff Garcia; Tim Pastore; Andrea Richter; Chris Núñez
- Producers: Maryna Harrison; Jamie Almeleh; Philip Barbb; John Brimhall
- Production location: Los Angeles, California
- Cinematography: Michael J. Pepin
- Editors: Matthew Bartus; Kevin Moore; Tyler Fausnaught; Jim Gaynor; Sean Gill
- Running time: 20-29 minutes
- Production companies: Netflix; All3Media; Best Production Company

Original release
- Network: Netflix
- Release: July 28 – July 28, 2021

Tattoo Redo is an American reality television series which premiered on Netflix on July 28, 2021.

== Premise ==
Hosted by comedian Jessimae Peluso, Tattoo Redo features the horror stories behind botched tattoos and the efforts of professional artists (Tommy Montoya, Miryam Lumpini, Rose Hardy, Matt Beckerich, and Twig Sparks) to execute cover-ups. The cover-up tattoos, co-designed by family members or loved ones, are kept secret from the subjects (via a screened partition) until the tattoo is completed.

== Reception ==
Upon its initial release, Tattoo Redo opened to mixed to positive reviews after debuting in Netflix's Top 10. Lucy Mangan of The Guardian wrote "the whole thing is ridiculously charming... Tattoo Redo manages to sidestep the elephant traps and stay light, breezy and really rather endearing, even before you add the joy of watching people create something from nothing." Daniel Hart of Ready Steady Cut called it "easy and cruel entertainment... the horrifying becomes even more horrifying, but from a reality TV perspective, it is glorious." Martin Brown of Common Sense Media said "There's a little thrill that happens every time a bad tattoo gets revealed...otherwise, Tattoo Redo often feels like a missed opportunity." Joel Keller of Decider judged the show as "Stream It!" (in Decider's "Stream It or Skip It!" column) and deemed it "a fun makeover show that sets the right tone by making fun of the awful tattoos people get while celebrating the artists that do an expert job of covering them up."

== Episodes ==
| No. overall | No. in season | Title | Original release date |
|---|---|---|---|
| 1 | 1 | "Who's Ready to See Some Bad Tattoos?" | 28 July 2021 |
Matt transforms a black blob into a bouquet, Tommy Montoya redoes a raunchy quote as a skull with mushrooms, and Rose tackles a tribute to an ex.
| 2 | 2 | "Hot Mess, Spicy Bets" | 28 July 2021 |
Twig gives a silly chile a makeover, Matt replaces Michael Jackson's glove with a rose, and Tommy erases a quote from Gladiator.
| 3 | 3 | "Let Your Freak Flag Fly" | 28 July 2021 |
Rose turns German song lyrics into a grandmotherly tribute. Twig covers witchy ink with a griffin, and Miryam hides a client's buttocks tattoo.
| 4 | 4 | "Lions and Goats and Exes, Oh My!" | 28 July 2021 |
Tommy and Rose fix two astrological tattoos. Miryam covers an ex's name with a skull.
| 5 | 5 | "Boos and Tattoos" | 28 July 2021 |
Matt addresses a curse word, Rose Hardy deals with a Satanic tattoo. Twig is tasked with fixing tattoo of lipstick that resembles a dog's penis.
| 6 | 6 | "Lost in Translation" | 28 July 2021 |
Twig turns backward lyrics into a dragon. Miryam must transform a tattoo of a naked woman.
