= Last Comic Standing season 6 =

The sixth season of Last Comic Standing began airing in May 2008. This competitive reality show on NBC was hosted by Bill Bellamy (continuing from season five) and a new co-host, Fearne Cotton. The contest was won by Iliza Shlesinger from Dallas, Texas.

== Auditions ==
Auditions were held in the following cities in early 2008, with the listed comics advancing to the semi-finals:

Date	City	Club	Judges	Contestants
January 29	Los Angeles	The Improv	Oscar Nuñez and Angela Kinsey of The Office	Erin Foley, Ron G., Eddie Pepitone, and Jackie Kashian
February 7–8	New York	Gotham Comedy Club	Steve Schirripa and Richard Belzer	Louis Ramey, God's Pottery, Stone & Stone, Dan Naturman, Esther Ku, Aparna Nancherla, and Bella Goth
February 14	Toronto, Ontario	Yuk Yuk's	Dave Foley and Richard Kind	Sean Cullen and Winston Spear
February 19	Minneapolis, Minnesota	Acme Comedy Club	Brian Baumgartner and Kate Flannery of The Office	Pete Lee, Dan Cummins and John Evans
February 22	Houston, Texas	Houston Improv.	Neil Flynn and Alfonso Ribeiro	Bob Biggerstaff and Andi Smith
February 26	Tempe, Arizona	Tempe Improv.	Fred Willard and Kathy Najimy	Marcus, Phil Palisoul, and Adam Hunter
February 29	San Francisco, California	Cobb's Comedy Club	Joshua Gomez and French Stewart	Drennon Davis, Jeff Dye, The Meehan Brothers, and Iliza Shlesinger
March 3	Nashville, Tennessee	Zanies	George Wendt and John Ratzenberger of Cheers	Heath Hyche, Taylor Mason, Erin Jackson, Mary Mack, and Dale Jones
	Miami, Florida		Lonny Ross and Keith Powell	Shazia Mirza (UK), Jim Tavare (UK), Paul Foot (UK), Lioz Shem Tov (Israel), and Papa CJ (India)

=== Behind the scenes ===
Mark Breslin, owner of Yuk Yuk's comedy clubs, which hosted the Toronto audition for season 6, described the audition process. He explained that while anyone who wanted to could wait in line to audition, most would be dismissed after only one joke. Top local agents were given a number of specific call times for their clients. The first round of auditions were for a producer early in the morning, and those that were chosen came back for the celebrity judges in the afternoon. Breslin also confirmed that, while only two were shown advancing in the final broadcast, four comics had been initially chosen to advance to the finals. Brian Lazanik, one of the two finalists who did not end up at the Vegas finals, has said that he was also chosen as a finalist in season 5's Toronto auditions, but was similarly cut. Producers for the show called his agent, urging him to try out again for season 6.

In addition to the scheduled auditions, host Bill Bellamy visited several clubs in other U.S. cities during the audition period, with the comedians apparently not knowing they were secretly being judged for the show. At the end of the show, Bellamy would take the stage and announce who would be invited to compete at one of the scheduled auditions for a spot in the semi-finals. Some of these visits included February 11 at The Punchline in Atlanta, Georgia, and February 16 at The Comedy Castle in Royal Oak, Michigan. Chosen comics from these two sessions were flown to New York and Minneapolis respectively for those auditions.

== Semi-finals ==
The semi-final round was held at the Paris Hotel in Las Vegas from March 28–30, 2008. From there, 12 were selected to move into the house as finalists, as had been done in previous seasons. The semi-finalists were divided into two groups, with five comics chosen from the first and seven from the second group of twelve.

== Finalists ==
Elimination Chart
Comics	Head-to-head		Public Elimination		
Comics	Episode 8	Episode 9	Episode 10	Episode 11	Episode 12
Iliza Shlesinger	WIN	WIN	IN	SAFE	LCS
Marcus	IN	IN	SAFE	IN	OUT
Jeff Dye	IN	SAFE	IN	IN	OUT
Jim Tavare	SAFE	IN	IN	IN	OUT
Louis Ramey	IN	IN	IN	IN	OUT
Sean Cullen	IN	IN	IN	OUT	
Adam Hunter	IN	IN	IN	OUT	
Ron G.	IN	IN	IN	OUT	
Papa CJ	IN	OUT			
Paul Foot	IN	OUT			
Esther Ku	OUT				
God's Pottery	OUT				

LCS means the comic was the last comic standing
SAFE means the comic won the immunity challenge
WIN means the comic participated and won the head-to-head showdown
OUT means the comic lost in the head-to-head showdown or by viewer voting and was eliminated
IN means the comic advanced to another episode

=== Head-to-head rounds ===
The first two head-to-head challenges went similarly to previous seasons. Each finalist declared "I know I'm funnier than...", and named another comic. The comic who received the most votes in this manner was forced to compete at the next showdown. As with previous two seasons, the first elimination pitted three comics in a standup showdown, with the audience voting for their favorite performance, and the winner of the vote being the only one of the three to remain on the show. The comic voted to perform got to choose their two opponents; however, unlike past seasons, the comic could choose any of their fellow comics, and not just those who had voted for them. This rendered moot a strategy of not voting for the likely voting target in order to not get subsequently chosen by them to perform. It also eliminated the common situation in which only two comics had voted for the loser, forcing those to perform. As in previous seasons, an immunity challenge took place before each vote, with the winner able to vote, but not liable to be voted for.

For the third challenge, a twist was announced to the contestants after the immunity challenge: All of the remaining contestants would have to perform, with the home audience voting for the winners; this is essentially the same as the normal public elimination rounds from past seasons, except that immunity was in play for one contestant. The highest vote-getters in the group advanced to the Las Vegas final performances.

=== Challenges and activities ===
Episode 8

- The 12 finalists did a "calendar shoot", choosing their own zany costumes and props.
- The immunity challenge was a boxing-themed "Last Comic Smackdown", in which the comics were paired randomly for head-to-head one-minute rounds; the first round was "yo momma" jokes; the four comics judged best advanced to the second round of "you're such a hack..." jokes, with the winner of each pairing advancing to the final free-for-all (no restrictions) round. God's Pottery advanced to the finals with the unorthodox choice of telling complimentary jokes (the judges believed that most of the other contestants were stealing jokes), but were beaten by the traditional insults of Jim Tavaré. Rich Fields appeared as the ring announcer for the challenge.

Episode 9

- The 10 finalists did a "Comic Car Wash," washing cars while telling jokes for tips.
- The immunity challenge involved the comics performing prop comedy in a Bed Bath and Beyond store using only objects found within the store. The comics had a set time to gather items, and an hour subsequently to prepare their acts. They performed in front of a small audience at the store, in addition to the judge, Carrot Top. Jeff Dye was declared the winner by Carrot Top. Dye used props to perform brief scenes from a variety of famous films.

Episode 10

- The 8 finalists had to entertain fraternity boys, little people, female bodybuilders and Deal or No Deal models at a restaurant.
- The immunity challenge took the comics to The Playboy Mansion. Each was assigned a title and had to tell a bedtime story to the three stars of The Girls Next Door, with the girls choosing the funniest as winner. Marcus, who told his story using impressions in the style of a film trailer, was chosen as the winner.

Episode 11

- The 8 finalists had to perform, then were told after the performance whether they'd received enough votes during the previous show to win. Votes cast during this show were used to determine the winner in the final episode.

Episode 12

- God's Pottery did an Olympics spoof song, while Bill and Fearne lit the torch.
- Joel McHale reviewed this season of Last Comic Standing in a mini Soup segment.
- The final 5 were insulted by Triumph the Insult Comic Dog.
- Louis Ramey and Jim Tavare were eliminated
- Judges Steve Schirripa and Richard Belzer questioned the final 3, after which, Jeff Dye was eliminated.
- The final 2, Iliza Shlesinger and Marcus, had to perform.
- Iliza won, making her the only female Last Comic Standing.

== Tour ==
The Final 5 comics entered a nationwide tour, hosted by Louis Ramey. Each comedian performs for about 25 minutes.
