= Sunda Croonquist =

American comedian

Sunda Croonquist is an American comedian. She has appeared on Comics Unleashed, Premium Blend, and The View.

== Early life ==
Sunda Croonquist was born in Paterson, New Jersey to an African-American mother and Swedish father. Inspired by her father's career as a musician and having a stage/pageant mother, Croonquist wanted to be an entertainer at a very young age.

She was runner up in the Miss America Pageant's preliminary representing the state of New Jersey. Years later she again represented New Jersey but this time as "New Jersey's Funniest Female."

With a BA in Criminal Justice, Croonquist also worked as a probation and parole review officer in Newark, New Jersey. She then worked as a detective while taking acting classes and eventually landed roles in local plays and films

== Comedy career ==
At a chance encounter in New York City, Croonquist was joking around at a party when she met Jackie Mason, who told her to seriously consider doing stand-up comedy and with her husband's encouragement, took a comedy class and had her first paid gig within weeks. Her first performance was at a club called Don't Tell Mama.

Croonquist has produced her own comedy shows including: Femmes Fatales one of the longest running female comedy showcases for New York's Toyota Comedy Festival for eight years. She is also the chairperson for the Annual "Laugh Off", an event that brings awareness to Gilda's Club in Northern New Jersey. This is a cancer support group that was formed by comedian Gilda Radner.

=== Lawsuit ===
Croonquist gained attention in the media in August 2009 when her mother-in-law, Ruth Zafrin, filed a lawsuit against her in U.S. District Court for allegedly spreading false, defamatory and racist lies about Zafrin's family in her stand-up act. Croonquist said she didn't even know she was being taken to court until she was asked, at an audition, to explain the lawsuit. The suit was later tossed out. Per Croonquist's live interview on NBC's Today on May 9, 2010, she was initially sued by her sister-in-law who then asked her mother, Ruth, to join the lawsuit.

== Personal life ==
Sunda has been married to Mark Zafrin since 1994. The couple have two children that were raised Jewish. Before she met her husband, Croonquist converted to Judaism, which he and his mother, her mother-in-law, adhere to.

== Bibliography ==
- Demasters, Karen (August 1, 1999). "COMEDY; Hearing the Laughter in Women's Lives". The New York Times.
