= Cooking on High =

American cooking competition show on Netflix

- Genre: Reality television
- Directed by: Marcel Fuentes
- Starring: Josh Leyva (host); Ngaio Bealum (weed-expert)
- No. of seasons: 1
- No. of episodes: 12

Production
- Executive producers: Jay James; Sean Olsen; Melinda Rocha; Colin Whelan
- Cinematography: Michael Boidy
- Running time: 13–15 minutes
- Production company: Stage 13

Original release
- Network: Netflix
- Release: June 22, 2018

Cooking on High is an American cooking competition television show that premiered on streaming platform Netflix on June 22, 2018. The show's premise centers on cooking foods that contain marijuana as an ingredient. The guest chefs are professional cannabis cooks whose knowledge of infused food take a center role in their careers as private chefs and medicinal marijuana educators. The show is hosted by YouTuber Josh Leyva. Featuring cannabis activist and comedian Ngaio Bealum, who provides short segments on the science of cannabis cooking and introduces the "strain of the day".

The show's first season has received generally poor feedback from critics, with the Washington Post's Sonia Rao calling it "the worst food show on Netflix". However, Bealum's performance was positively reviewed by Rao as "the one redeeming quality". The program was originally shot as a web series, so the episodes are kept short.

The show was removed from Netflix in June 2021.

== Episodes ==
No.	Title	Guest judges	Chefs	Original release date
1	"Afternoon Delight"	Mod Sun, Ramon Rivas II	Luke Reyas, Andrea Drummer	June 22, 2018
2	"Going Green"	Ray Wright, Serk Spliff, Manu Li, Brad Silnutzer	Andie Leon, Brandon Coates	June 22, 2018
3	"Baked Potatoes"	Chris Bryant, Vince Royale	Mike Delao, Jonathan Portela	June 22, 2018
4	"French Fried"	Heather Pasternak, Vitaly Zdorovetskiy	Andrea Drummer, Brandon Coates	June 22, 2018
5	"Southern Comfort"	Aristotle Georgeson, Wax	Chef Nugs, Brian Vaccarella	June 22, 2018
6	"Mexi-Cannabis"	Warm Brew, Vince Royale	Chef Dee, Mike Delao	June 22, 2018
7	"Wake and Bake"	Chris Cope, Heather Pasternak	Brady Farmer, Brandon Coates	June 22, 2018
8	"Carb Loaded"	Rob Fee, Allen Strickland Williams	Brian Vaccarella, Chef Dee	June 22, 2018
9	"Roll 'Em Up"	Mod Sun, Sam Jay	Andrea Dummer, Brady Farmer	June 22, 2018
10	"Fast Food Toke Out"	Solomon Georgio, Wax	Chef Nugs, Chef Dee	June 22, 2018
11	"Mexicasian"	Chris Cope, Ramon Rivas II	Luke Reyes, Brian Vaccarella	June 22, 2018
12	"Munchie Mania"	Brad Silnutzer, Vitaly Zdorovetskiy	Brady Farmer, Luke Reyes	June 22, 2018

== See also ==
- Cooked with Cannabis, 2020 Netflix series with similar premise
