= Cannabis Planet =

American television series

- Genre: News, infomercial
- Created by: Brad Lane
- Country of origin: United States
- Original language: English
- No. of seasons: 4.2
- No. of episodes: 47

Production
- Executive producer: Brad Lane
- Production location: Los Angeles, California
- Running time: 30 minutes
- Production companies: Cannabis Planet Productions, Inc.

Original release
- Network: KJLA-TV, WHDT-TV (first episode aired on KDOC-TV)
- Release: July 2009 – present

Cannabis Planet is an American television program created by Brad Lane with the intent to promote the benefits of marijuana. According to producers, the show covers "the merits of the cannabis plant (medicinally, industrially, agriculturally), and the benefits this plant brings to planet earth, mankind and the United States." The Los Angeles–based program first broadcast in July 2009 on the television station KJLA, which airs throughout most of Southern California. Most recently, the program broadcast 13 new episodes into five major media markets including Los Angeles, Chicago, Philadelphia, Washington, D.C., and Palm Beach. (October 2017 – January 2018)

Cannabis Planet was originally co-hosted by West Coast Cannabis Magazine publisher Ngaio Bealum and medical marijuana activist Sarah Diesel and Broadcaster/TV Host Lani Garcia, Seasons 2 and 3 were hosted by Brandon Stone and Jean Marie Tolkien. Season 4 the show took on a high tech look and featured a variety of hosting presenters. The program also features news presenter Patrick Finerty, field reporters Seirah Royin and Dragonfly de la Luz, horticulturist and author Ed Rosenthal as a cannabis expert, and chef Mike Delao to illustrate the preparation of cannabis foods.

== History ==
The idea of Cannabis Planet came to Brad Lane in May 2009 after he observed an increasing number of advertisements in OC Weekly relating to marijuana and alternative medicine. With some background in television programming (Lane developed The Mammoth Channel, a tourist-oriented program that aired in local hotels), he worked quickly to get the program broadcast just three months later. KDOC-TV aired the first episode in July 2009, but the station "got cold feet", allowing KJLA to continue broadcasting the series.

In the San Francisco Bay Area, KOFY-TV picked up Cannabis Planet in 2010 and aired it on Fridays at midnight, but was unable to remain on the air following their post proposition 19 election episode in November due to lack of sponsors.

The show also aired in Sacramento on KTNC television and in San Diego on Cox Channel 14 following the KTLA news broadcast each Friday evening at 11:00 p.m.

Season 4 of Cannabis Planet aired in November 2013 in Los Angeles, San Francisco, Sacramento, San Diego, in addition to Phoenix, Arizona, Detroit, Michigan, Las Vegas, Nevada and Denver, Colorado. Cannabis Planet 4.0 re-launched on Thanksgiving Weekend 2013 into fourteen media markets focusing on Prohibition States. The series is hosted by committee alternating each week, Celeste Creel, Salome Azizi and Jacqueline Robinson share this task. Returning cast members include news anchor Patrick Finerty who provides weekly information about industrial HEMP and Chef Mike DeLao providing healthy Hemp recipes. Season one co-host Ngaio Bealum returns to the show with a weekly segment, "The Higher Perspective", offering a philosophical perspective on the plant.

On October 14, 2017, Cannabis Planet returned to the national television airwaves with a vengeance with 13 freshly baked episodes. Celebrity guests included The Walking Dead's Cooper Andrews, Orange Is the New Black's Matt Peters, the NBA's John Salley, Riley Cote and Darren Jackson from the NHL, Marvin Washington, Nate Jackson and Eben Britton from the NFL, former MMA star Steve Cantwell, and many more. New presenters Heidi Kaufman and Rebecca Capatano joined returning cast members Patrick Finerty, Celeste Creel, Solame Azizi and Jacqueline Robinson. Chef Mike DeLao and comedian Ngaio Bealum are also in the mix.

== Production ==
According to Lane, Cannabis Planet costs about $10,000 a week to produce. Based in Los Angeles, the series also airs in Chicago on WOCK TV, Philadelphia on WACP TV, Washington, D.C., on WMDE TV and in Palm Beach on WHDT TV.

Lane hopes to eventually air the program on a national basis, yet Satellite providers such as Direct TV and Dish Network have banned the programming from airing.

Stations that have broadcast Cannabis Planet in the past include, Los Angeles, California (KJLA); San Francisco (KOFY), Sacramento, Miami, Florida (WHDT); Eugene, Oregon (WEVU); Harrisburg, Lancaster, York, Lebanon, Pennsylvania (WGCB); Plano, Texas (KDBC); Waco, Texas (KFXK); Nacogdoches, Texas (KETK); Baton Rouge, Louisiana (WBRL)/(KZUP); Lafayette, Louisiana (KLAF).
