= Papa CJ =

Indian comedian

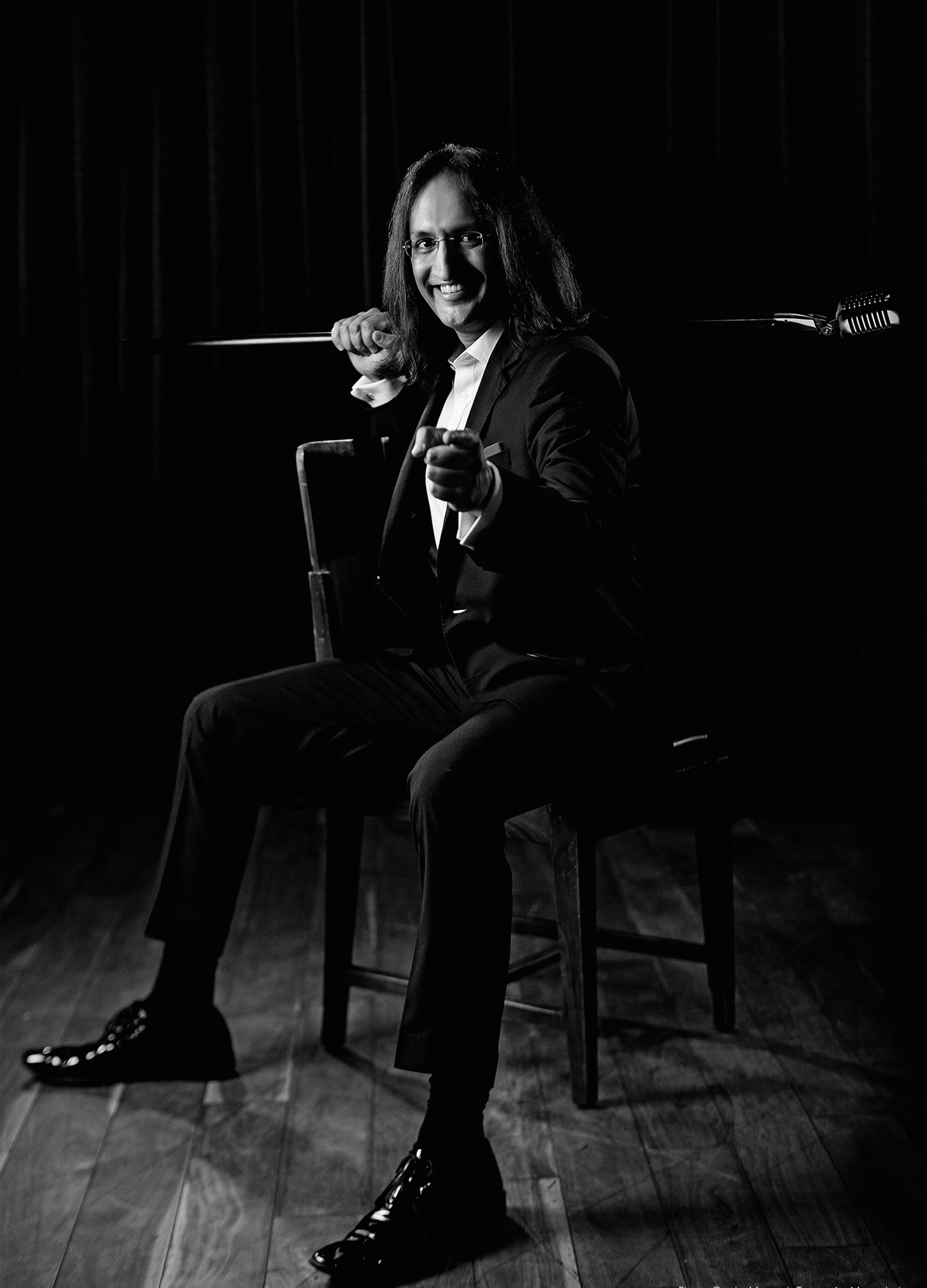
- Papa CJ in one of his show posters
- Occupation: Stand-Up Comedian
- Website: www.papacj.com

Papa CJ is a stand-up comedian from India. In November 2014, he won the 'Asia's Best Stand-up Comedian' award by Top 10 Magazine in Kuala Lumpur. He has toured sell-out shows across five continents and in October 2011 he taped a Showtime USA Stand-up Comedy Special with Russell Peters in Amsterdam.

== Early life and career ==
Papa CJ did his schooling at the Lawrence School Sanawar in India where he was the head boy and then went on to do an MBA at the University of Oxford from the Saïd Business School.

He then worked as a management consultant in London. He has also worked as an executive coach and motivational speaker and has trained executives from over 50 blue chip companies all over the world.

== Comedy career ==
After visiting the Edinburgh Fringe Festival in 2004, he gave up his corporate career and started performing stand-up comedy in November of that year. He has since performed in North America, Europe, Asia, Australia and Africa. After being a regular on the UK comedy circuit he moved back to New Delhi in early 2008, where he started off the English language stand-up comedy circuit in India and began grooming new talent. In 2008 he was also a contestant on Last Comic Standing 6 on NBC, where from over 3000 worldwide contestants he made it to the final 10.

In 2009 Papa CJ became the first Indian comedian to be invited to perform at the Just for Laughs festival in Canada. In 2015 he became the first Indian comedian invited to do a solo show at the Melbourne International Comedy Festival, where he took his comedy special 'Papa CJ | Naked'. He has performed multiple times at the Edinburgh Fringe Festival. In 2016 he sold out the Soho Theatre in London and got two standing ovations on his Broadway debut in New York when he headlined Carolines on Broadway.

== Publishing career ==
Papa CJ's debut book, an autobiography titled 'Naked', was published in the Indian subcontinent by Westland, an Amazon company, on 16 December 2019.

He has written articles for multiple publications including Harvard Business Review and Forbes Magazine. He is also a regular columnist for The Economic Times.

== Teaching career ==
Papa CJ is a Visiting Faculty Member at Ashoka University. The module he teaches explores The Entrepreneur's Human Advantage: the distinctly human capabilities that increasingly differentiate entrepreneurs and leaders in an AI-enabled world. In his highly interactive classes, he draws on lessons from behavioural psychology, stand-up comedy, storytelling and authentic leadership to impart his teachings.

== Philanthropy ==
Under his initiative called The Papa CJ Happiness Project, he performs in support of charitable causes across the world and particularly in India. In addition to fundraising shows he also performs free shows in hospitals and for long suffering patients in their homes.

== Motivational speaking, corporate training and executive coaching ==
Papa CJ runs multiple different training modules for organizations, the most popular of which apply learnings from stand-up comedy into the personal and professional lives of people in the workplace.

Among the sessions he has developed are A Comedian's Guide to Communication Strategy and Naked Leadership. The latter combines elements of theatrical performance with leadership training and reflective learning activities designed to encourage participants to examine and prioritize aspects of their personal and professional lives. The programme emphasizes self-reflection and personal development.

Papa CJ is regularly invited as a motivational speaker and has spoken on multiple platforms including TEDx and Josh Talks.
