= Sean Gill =

American writer and film editor

- Born: Akron, Ohio, United States
- Education: Oberlin College
- Occupations: Author, editor
- Writing career
- Years active: 2000s-present
- Genres: Short stories, Novels, Non-fiction, Documentary, Reality television
- Website: seangillfilms.com

Sean Gill is an American writer and film editor.

== Education ==
Gill is a graduate of Oberlin College and Werner Herzog's Rogue Film School. He studied privately with Juan Luis Buñuel.

== Television ==
Gill's television work includes editing episodes of Queer Eye, 12 Hours With, Martha Knows Best, Martha Gets Down and Dirty, The Real Housewives of Atlanta, The Real Housewives of New Jersey, Ink Master, Ink Master: Angels, Tattoo Redo, America's Top Dog, White House Christmas 2022, as well as documentary specials for National Geographic and The Weather Channel. For his work on Queer Eye, he was nominated for 2022 and 2023 Emmy Awards for Outstanding Picture Editing for a Structured Reality or Competition Program and the 2022 American Cinema Editors "Eddie" Award for Best Edited Non-Scripted Series.

== Theater ==
Gill has written several plays produced in New York City, including Go-Go Killers! (2009), Stage Blood Is Never Enough (2009), and Dreams of the Clockmaker (2010). He co-wrote the story to two full-length dance dramas by Rachel Klein, The Tragedy of Maria Macabre (2011) and Symphony of Shadows (2012). Tom Murrin of PAPER described him as "an imaginative, experienced playwright/filmmaker... with apocalyptic vision."

== Literary career ==
Gill's short stories and essays have been published in The Iowa Review, Michigan Quarterly Review, The Cincinnati Review, The Threepenny Review, Los Angeles Review of Books, Five Points: A Journal of Literature and Art, The Brooklyn Rail, BOMB Magazine, The Common, Joyland, The Saturday Evening Post, Sonora Review, So It Goes: The Literary Journal of the Kurt Vonnegut Museum and Library, Hemingway Shorts: The Literary Journal of the Ernest Hemingway Foundation of Oak Park, Akashic Books, Fiction Southeast, failbetter, Monkeybicycle, Eclectica Magazine, Word Riot, and elsewhere. He is a regular contributor to McSweeney's Internet Tendency, Epiphany Magazine, and ZYZZYVA.

== Literary awards ==
Year	Title	Award	Judge	Result	Ref.
2015	"You Have Now Eaten Thirty-Four Spiders"	storySouth Million Writers Award		Nominated	
2016	"Beyond the Terminus, Beyond"	Sonora Review Fiction Prize	Molly Antopol	Won	
2016	"The Lakes and the Falls"	Glimmer Train Very Short Fiction Contest	Linda Swanson-Davies & Susan Burmeister-Brown	Finalist	
2017	"Edifice and Artifice in Buda and Pest"	River Styx Microfiction Contest		Won	
2018	"For Want of a Better Word"	Robert and Adele Schiff Award in Fiction, The Cincinnati Review	Michael Griffith	Won	
2019	"The Statement of [REDACTED], Revised"	Gail B. Crump Prize for Experimental Fiction, Pleiades	Jennifer Maritza McCauley	Won	
2019	"Dignity and Urgency in Edinburgh and London"	Lawrence Foundation Prize, Michigan Quarterly Review	Laura Kasischke	Won	
2021	"The Tainting of the Nook"	The Academy for Teachers' "Stories Out of School" Contest, A Public Space	Jonathan Lethem	Finalist	
2021	"The Keepers of the Skull"	Witness Literary Awards	Bonnie Chau	Finalist	
2023	"Join Hands"	Edinburgh Prize in Flash Fiction, Scottish Arts Trust	Zoë Strachan & Louise Welsh	3rd place	
