= Eggman =

Eggman, Egman, Eggsman, Eggmen, The Egg Man, or similar may refer to:

- Someone who works with eggs, e.g.:
  - Performing delivery (commerce)
  - Using eggs as food
  - Egg farming
- Someone who works with egg cells

== Real people and groups ==
- Susan Eggman (born 1961), U.S. politician, California state assemblymember
- Eggman, a nickname for Ralph Eggleston (1965–2022), Pixar animator
- Eggman, a moniker used by Sice Rowbottom, formerly of the Boo Radleys
- Michael Eggman, U.S. farmer and small businessman, younger brother of Susan Eggman, who ran for California's District 10 of the United States House of Representatives in 2014, 2016, and 2018
- The Egg Man, a name for Michael Bruce Ross (1959–2005), American serial killer
- Egg Man and Egg White, nicknames for Toby Reynolds — see incelcore
- Laila Solveig Egman-Andersson (born 1942), Swedish Olympic gymnast
- Neva Eggsman (died 2003), the last speaker of the Klamath language (see List of languages by time of extinction § 21st century)
- The Eggmen, an Austin-based Beatles tribute band with Brian Jepson
- "The Incredible Egg Man", a name in some headlines for Howard Helmer (died 2025), American chef

== Fictional entities ==
- Doctor Eggman, also known as Doctor Ivo Robotnik, the main antagonist of Sega's Sonic the Hedgehog series
  - Mr. Dr. Eggman, the New Yoke City counterpart of the regular Eggman, from Sonic Prime
  - Eggman Nega, Eggman's descendant from 200 years in the future, first introduced in Sonic Rush
- The Egg Man, played by Paul Swift, in the 1972 film Pink Flamingos by John Waters
- Egg Man, played by Walt Flanagan in Clerks (film) (1994), as one of multiple roles
- Egg Man, played by Paul Kandel in The Visit (play) at Criterion Center Stage Right in 1992
- Egg Man, played by Brad Ward in The Beast Pageant (2010)
- Egg Man in Diner, played without credit by Frank Faylen in Steel Against the Sky (1941)
- "The egg man" and "the egg men", mentioned in the Beatles' 1967 song "I Am the Walrus"
- Eggmen, a group from Disney's Duck Universe; see List of DuckTales characters and List of Darkwing Duck characters
- Eggmen, a group from the children's novel series Leven Thumps by Obert Skye
- Eggman Movers/Moving, a company in Pixar films, named after animator Ralph Eggleston

== Works ==
- The Egg Man, a 1968 public monument in Chicago by Vittore Bocchetta
- "The Egg Man", a short story by Janni Howker, that won the 1984 Tom-Gallon Trust Award
- "Egg Man", a song by the Beastie Boys on 1989 album Paul's Boutique
- "The Egg Man", a 1994 song by Y'all (theater act)
- Egg Man, a 1994 film by Tai Entertainment
- "E.G.G.M.A.N.", the 2001 theme song by Paul Shortino for the Sonic character Dr. Eggman
- "Egg Man", a segment of S2 E13 (#35) of Ripley's Believe It or Not! (2000 TV series), 2001
- "The Egg Man", a short story by Scott Smith (author), published in Open City Magazine, Issue #20 (2005)
- The Egg Man, a 2008 novella by Carlton Mellick III
- "The Egg Man", a short story by Mary Rosenblum, published in Asimov's, 2008, Year's Best SF 14 (2009), and The Year's Best Science Fiction: Twenty-Sixth Annual Collection (2009)
- "Egg Men", a 2010 guest appearance by Step Brothers (duo) on I Don't Need Love by Evidence (musician)
- "The Egg Man", by Fiona Moore, published in Sanity Clause is Coming (London: Fringeworks Press), 2014
- Egg Man (originally Beidah Man) by Kerolos Bahgat, (Cairo: Dar Toya For Publishing and Distributing), 2017
- "Eggs Men", S6 E5 of Carnival Eats, 2018

== See also ==
- Egg predation or ovivory
- Incubator (egg)
- Egg (disambiguation)
- Man (disambiguation)
- Men (disambiguation)

=== Music ===
- "Big Butter and Egg Man", 1926 jazz song written by Percy Venable for Louis Armstrong and May Alix
- Live in Egg-man, a 1985 album by Mitsuko Horie
- "Einstein on the Beach (For an Eggman)", a 1994 song by Counting Crows on DGC Rarities Vol. 1
- "April Fools and Eggmen", a song by Fair to Midland on 2007 album Fables from a Mayfly: What I Tell You Three Times Is True
- "Arrow-Pierced-Egg-Man", the first track on 2010 album Hyphenated-man by Mike Watt

=== Visual media ===
- The Butter and Egg Man, 1925 play by George S. Kaufman
- The Butter and Egg Man (1928 film)
- "The Big Blunder and Egg Man", S3 E20 (#95) of The Many Loves of Dobie Gillis, 1962
- "The Incredible, Inedible Eggmen", episode 5 of animated series Stunt Dawgs, 1992
- "We Are the Eggmen", S2 E10 (#33) of Canadian television series Due South, 1996
- "Fry Am the Egg Man", S6 E22 (#110) of American television series Futurama, 2011
- "The Eggman Cometh", S3 E16 (#48) of American television series Ben 10: Ultimate Alien, 2012
- "Crocodile, egg, man", a 2020 work by Nathalie Djurberg and Hans Berg, that broke the record for sale price of a contemporary Swedish artwork
