= Miryam Lumpini =

Swedish-born tattoo artist and painter (born 1990)

- Born: Miryam Theresa Lumpini; 3 December 1990 (age 35); Stockholm, Sweden
- Style: Tattooist; Painter
- Movement: Neotraditional
- Children: 3

Miryam Theresa Lumpini is a Swedish-born American-based tattoo artist and painter.

== Early life ==
Lumpini was born on 3 December 1990 in Stockholm, Sweden to a Swedish mother and Congolese father. She was raised in the remote countryside of Gothenburg by her single mother.

== Career ==
Lumpini moved to Los Angeles, California in 2012 to pursue a tattooing career after studying graphic design. She started tattooing as an amateur while in high school. She calls herself “The Witch Doctor”. She has been praised for her use of color.

Notable clients Lumpini has tattooed include Jhené Aiko, Skrillex, and Swae Lee.

Lumpini designed a shoe for Reebok.

Lumpini appeared as a cast member in the 2021 Netflix show Tattoo Redo when she was pregnant with her first son. In 2022, she gave birth to twin boys.
