= Ngaio Bealum =

American comedian, musician, writer, actor, and publisher

- Born: February 15, 1968 (age 58); San Francisco, California, U.S.
- Occupations: Comedian, actor, publisher, musician, writer
- Writing career
- Genres: observational comedy, alternative comedy, Storytelling
- Subjects: American culture, pop culture, everyday life, Cannabis Culture, recreational drug use
- Notable works: West Coast Cannabis Magazine; Cooking on High; Rollin with Ngaio; Ask 420

Ngaio Bealum is an American comedian, musician, writer, actor, activist, juggler and publisher. He co-hosted Cannabis Planet and published West Coast Cannabis Magazine. Bealum hosted a podcast on Cannabis Radio. The podcast was formatted as a travelogue, covering live cannabis events with a discussion on current cannabis topics and trends. Bealum was a contributor for the Sacramento News & Review, writing the Ask420 column on marijuana and its politics, as well as a host on the cannabis trivia app Daily Bonfire.

Ngaio was born in San Francisco to hippie parents, who were active in their community as Black Panthers. As an entertainer and activist, Bealum guests on television and cultural commentary podcasts, notably on topics concerning the cannabis industry. From new products and technology, as well as cannabis activism and legalization. Bealum is a frequent guest on Getting Doug With High hosted by fellow comedian Doug Benson, regularly hosts High Times events, and participates in the annual International Cannabis Business Conference. His debut comedy album "Weed and Sex" was released in 2012. Bealum was also a member of the award-winning hip hop band Most Chill Slackmob (vocals, percussion), and 1994 People's Choice Award winner of the International Jugglers Association Fest.

Bealum featured on a line of cannabis "pre-rolls" through Mothership Farms, where he showcased unique Cannabis strains through his close relationship with growers. The first release was Tahoe Nebula. He also has a featured strain through Natural Cannabis' "High Life Celebrities" line.

== Podcasts ==
- Chopping it Up (2022)
- Rollin with Ngaio (2016)

== Discography ==
- Weedier and Sexier (2019) 800 Pound Gorilla Records
- 420 Friendly Comedy Special (2014) Apprehensive Films- Compilation DVD/Blu-ray
- Weed and Sex (2012) Dogpatch Media
- A Stash of Stand-Up Comedy: Pot's Greatest Hits (2005) Laughter Heals- Compilation

== Credits ==
- Cooking on High (2018)
- Laughs (2014)
- Hey Monster, Hands Off My City (2014)
- Sarah Silverman Program (2007–2008)
- Comics Unleashed with Bryon Allen (2005)
- It Burns When I Laugh (2003)
- Nine Months (1995)
- Comic Justice (1993)
- Cheesehead Show KDBK Radio (1993)
