= Morgan Murphy (comedian) =

American comedian and actress (b. 1981)

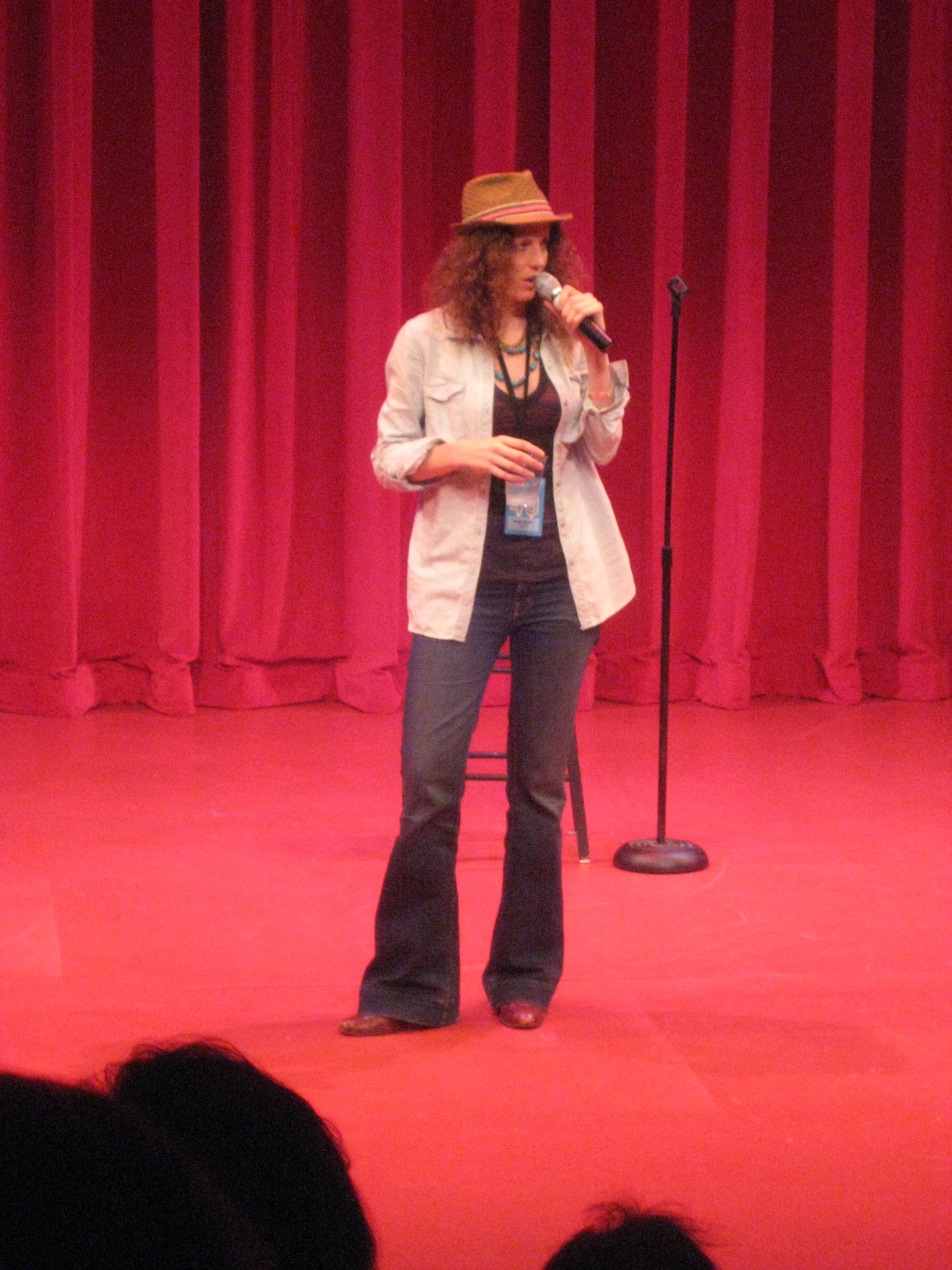
- Murphy at Bumbershoot 2010
- Born: October 23, 1981 (age 45); Portland, Oregon, U.S.
- Occupations: Actress; comedian; writer

Morgan Murphy (born October 23, 1981) is an American stand-up comedian, writer, and actress. She has performed in the Comedians of Comedy tour and appeared in the Comedians of Comedy: Live at the Troubador DVD. Bobcat Goldthwait cast her in the films Sleeping Dogs Lie (2006) and World's Greatest Dad (2009). She has also been a featured performer for all three years of Aimee Mann's "Christmas Spectacular" tours and appeared in the video for Mann's song "31 Today". Morgan has made numerous appearances on Jimmy Kimmel Live!, for which she also worked as a writer.

== Life and career ==
Murphy was born in Portland, Oregon. She was mostly raised by her mother, who is Jewish, and was also brought up in this faith but did not have a bat mitzvah. Her father is Michael T. Murphy, a lawyer and former film producer who executive-produced the films St. Helens (1981) and The Osterman Weekend (1982), who is a Catholic of Irish descent.

Murphy attended high school in Southern California before relocating with her mother to Connecticut, after which she relocated again to Oregon, where she attended Jesuit High School in Beaverton.

She was one of the original writers on Late Night with Jimmy Fallon, writing and appearing in comedy segments on the show from its debut in 2009 until her departure in March 2011. The writing staff of the show was nominated for a Primetime Emmy Award in 2011. In 2014, she appeared on WTF with Marc Maron, and discussed her relationship with the host Marc Maron.

From 2012 to 2017, she was a writer on 2 Broke Girls and appeared on-camera in the episode "And the Drug Money", credited as "Sedate Girl". She also made a stand-up special for Netflix in 2013 called Irish Goodbye.

In 2020, Murphy underwent brain surgery to correct a congenital brainstem issue.

== Discography ==
- Irish Goodbye 2014 CD/Download (New Wave Dynamics)

== Filmography ==
=== Films ===
- Sleeping Dogs Lie aka Stay 2006 - Linda
- World's Greatest Dad 2009 - Morgan
- The Goods: Live Hard, Sell Hard 2009 - Karaoke Bartender
- It's Kind of a Funny Story 2010 - Joanie
- God Bless America 2011 - Fast Food Employee
- Who the F#ck Is Chip Seinfeld? 2011 - Morgan Murphy

=== Documentary ===
- Warren Ellis: Captured Ghosts 2011 - herself

=== Shorts ===
- Sheep Man 2006 - Wilma Vadins

=== Home Videos ===
- The Comedians of Comedy 2007 - DVD chapter: "Comedians To Pay Attention To" (Anchor Bay Entertainment)
- The Comedians Of Comedy (Live At The Troubadour) 2007 - DVD chapter: 9 (Image Entertainment)
- 2 Broke Girls: 2 Broke Girrrlllss with Sophie Kachinsky 2013 - DVD extra
- 2 Broke Girls: Max's Homemade Cupcakes - Go Big or Go Broke 2013 - DVD extra

=== Television ===
==== Movies ====
- The Offensive Show 2003 - writer
- Hackett 2008 - untitled role

==== Series ====
Actor

- The Lady Policeman 2005 - Co-co (Channel 101 web series)
- Yacht Rock 2005 - Rosanna Arquette (Channel 101 web series)
- Samantha Who? 2008 - Woman Protester
- 2 Broke Girls 2012 - Sedate Girl
- Drunk History 2014 - Narrator
- The Jim Gaffigan Show 2015 - Morgan Murphy

Writer/Producer

- Jimmy Kimmel Live! 2003-2006 - writer (338 episodes)
- Crank Yankers 2005 - writer (22 episodes)
- Human Giant 2007-2008 - consultant, writer (3 episodes)
- Shutterbugs 2008 - consultant writer (1 episode)
- Reality Bites Back 2008 - consulting producer (8 episodes)
- Late Night with Jimmy Fallon 2009-2011 - writer (411 episodes)
- Nick Swardson's Pretend Time 2011 - writer (1 episode)
- 2 Broke Girls 2012-2016 - producer (90 episodes), story editor (20 episodes), writer (11 episodes)
- Downward Dog 2017 - co-executive producer (7 episodes), writer (1 episode)
- Roseanne 2018 - consulting producer (9 episodes), writer (1 episode)
- Modern Family 2019-2020 - co-executive producer, actress, writer (20 episodes)
- Abbott Elementary 2021-2022 - writer (2 episodes)

==== Specials ====
- Morgan Murphy: Irish Goodbye 2013 Netflix special, 2014 streaming (also writer, executive producer)

Appearances

- Hilarity for Charity 2016 2016 (also writer)
- Doug Stanhope: The Comedians' Comedian's Comedians 2017 (also writer)

Consultant only

- 2007 MTV Movie Awards 2007
- Guys Choice 2007
- Cheech & Chong: Roasted 2008

==== Stand-Up and Interview Appearances ====
1 episode each, except where noted

- Funny Money 2003
- Premium Blend 2004-2005 (2 episodes)
- Jimmy Kimmel Live! 2004-2009 (7 episodes)
- Last Call with Carson Daly 2006
- CH Live: NYC 2009 (short)
- Late Night with Jimmy Fallon 2009-2011 (9 episodes)
- The Kevin Nealon Show 2010
- Red Eye 2011
- Chelsea Lately 2012-2014 (10 episodes)
- The Fogelnest Files 2013
- John Oliver's New York Stand-Up Show 2013
- Getting Doug with High 2014-2015 (3 episodes)
- Baby Talk 2015
- @midnight 2015-2017 (4 episodes)
- The Joe Rogan Experience 2016-2017 (2 episodes)
- Fadam & Friends Podcast 2023 (1 episode)

== Sources ==
- Maron, Marc (February 3, 2014). "Episode 476: Morgan Murphy". WTF with Marc Maron (Podcast).
