= Louis Ramey =

Comedy career
- Medium: Stand-up, television
- Website: http://www.louisramey.com

Louis Ramey is an African American stand-up comedian from Atlanta, Georgia. He started performing comedy while in college after being dared to perform by his friends.

He was featured in his own episode of Comedy Central Presents in 2001. It was filmed at the Hudson Theatre, in New York City. In 2008, he was a finalist on Last Comic Standing 6. On July 31, he was voted into the top 5. He finished in 5th place. He was then the host of the Last Comic Standing tour, in which he performed along with the 4 other finalists.

He briefly worked for Nickelodeon as a member of the Nick at Nite "Road Crew".

Comedian and former Daily Show correspondent Wyatt Cenac named Ramey as one of his comedy influences, saying that "I remember seeing guys like Vince Morris and Louis Ramey do stuff that wasn’t what you saw on ComicView".
