= Rachel Bonnetta =

Canadian television presenter

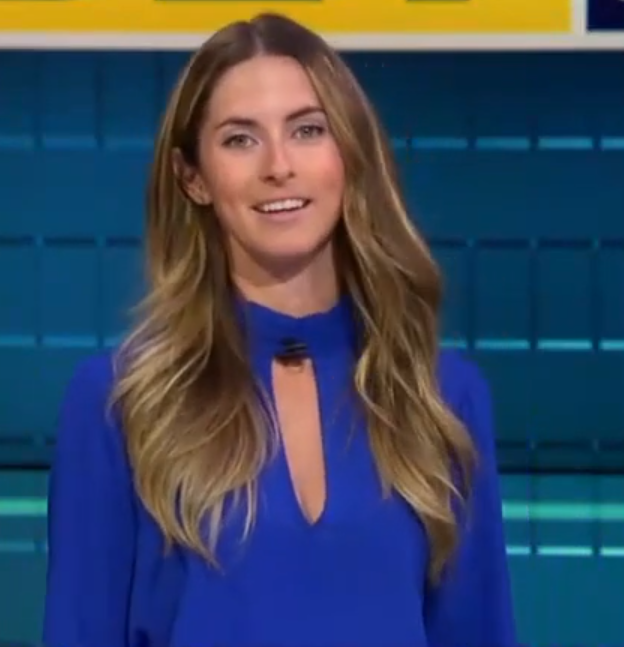
- Bonnetta in 2020
- Born: 8 October 1991 (age 35); Orono, Ontario, Canada
- Occupation: stand-up comedian
- Known for: reporting, hosting on NFL Network

Rachel Bonnetta (born 8 October 1991) is a Canadian stand-up comedian. She was formerly a reporter and a former television host for NFL Network in the United States. She joined Fox Sports in 2016, hosting the @TheBuzzer digital series firstly, then Fox Bet Live (formerly Lock It In) on Fox Sports 1 and Visa Sunday Live Show, a highlights package of weekly NFL game action, on Facebook.

Before moving to the U.S. in 2015, Bonnetta was brand ambassador for MLS club Toronto FC, as well as being the host of children's show The Zone on Canada's YTV from 2012 to 2015. This led to her hosting, at age 23, Major League Soccer daily shows MLS Now and Off Topic with Rachel Bonnetta from New York City in late 2015 and early 2016, before her move to the West Coast six months later.

In August 2021, Bonnetta was announced as the executive producer of a TBS comedy series "loosely based on her real life in the sports broadcasting world". Shortly thereafter, she joined NFL Network as a host on legalized sports betting-focused content, as well as the NFL's digital platforms such as NFL.com and the NFL app. Additionally, she will host, contribute and develop content on a variety of platforms across the NFL Media group, including a role on NFL Network's NFL GameDay Morning, host of NFL GameDay View, fill-in host on Good Morning Football, and a presence at signature events such as Super Bowl, NFL Honors and NFL Red Carpet.

Bonnetta left NFL Network in March 2023, reportedly as part of a cost-cutting measure, and switched careers to become a stand-up comedian.

== Personal life ==
Bonnetta is an alumna of Seneca College.

She is the sister of musician Jonas Bonnetta of Evening Hymns, and has two other brothers. She is also a niece of Bruce Boudreau.

In 2023, Bonnetta became engaged to Zach Schwartz.
