= Birdcloud =

Musical group

- Origin: Nashville, Tennessee, United States
- Genres: Country; acoustic
- Years active: 2010–2018, 2020
- Members: Makenzie Green; Jasmin Kaset
- Website: www.birdcloudamerica.com

Birdcloud is a country duo from Nashville, Tennessee. They are known for their offensive lyrics, which offer commentary on life in the American South. They toured the United States, Europe and Australia.

== History ==
Birdcloud was formed in 2010 in Murfreesboro, Tennessee while Kaset and Green were attending Middle Tennessee State University; of their early acquaintance, the pair met at MTSU in 2009 did not initially like each other, but bonded during a barbecue after realizing they shared a mutual dislike of another student. Within a week of first playing together, they were playing shows, and a year later recorded their first EP. Birdcloud developed a signature playing style in which the two women face each other rather than their audience, as described by Kaset: "It’s less about excluding other people than doing what it takes to become Birdcloud."

After a tour of Australia in October 2018, the group went silent on official social media channels and then later canceled its remaining shows for the year.

On July 1, 2019, Makenzie Green posted on Instagram that she was seeking an opportunity to resume her musical career outside of Birdcloud.

On Jan. 20, 2020, the band reactivated social media accounts and stated it was back.

== Controversy ==
In response to their songs "Indianer" and "Black Guys", Birdcloud has received death threats and calls for boycott. Green said: "We're not specifically these characters we sing about in our songs. It's a commentary on a mentality we have grown up around."

== Discography ==
- Cool Christmas – 2011
- Fuck You Cop – 2012
- One More Again – 2012
- Effortless – 2013
- Singles Only – 2016
- Birdcloud – 2018
- Wild Turkey 101 – 2018
- Cool Christmas / Silent Night – 2024
