= Lahna Turner =

American comedian

- Born: United States
- Spouse: Ralphie May (m. 2005; died 2017)

Comedy career
- Medium: Stand-up; television; radio; film
- Genre: Observational comedy

Lahna Turner is an American stand-up comedian. She is primarily known for having been married to comedian Ralphie May.

== Early life ==
As a child, Turner and her family moved from Canada to Houston, Texas, for her father's career with Exxon.

Turner attended what is now Texas State University, where she earned her bachelor's degree in fine arts with a focus in photo technology. Turner worked full-time as a photographer throughout her college career. At the age of 19, she started an unofficial internship with the Associated Press, which eventually led to a freelance position with the organization.

== Career ==
Turner began her comedy career after college in Houston, where she performed three comedic songs at a local open microphone night. She booked her first paying gig two months later. In 2004, Turner released her first comedy album, Dick Jokes & Other Assorted Love Songs. She later recorded If These Lips Could Talk (2012), her first one-hour special So…. I Wrote a Song About It (2014) and Limeade (2017), the first ever comedy visual album. Turner's albums have received airplay at top radio stations across the country, as well as National Lampoon's Top 40 comedy countdown, and are in rotation on SiriusXM Satellite Radio. She also has an early, noncomedy album called Life as a Human.

Turner made her big-screen debut in Teacher of the Year (2014), in which she played Ursula Featherstone. She also appeared in This Is Meg (2017), Brand New Old Love (2018) and was a producer of What's Eating Ralphie May? (2019). She was also the executive producer for the documentary 360 Degrees Down.

== Personal life ==
On July 3, 2005, Turner married fellow comedian Ralphie May, with whom she had a daughter in September 2007 and a son in June 2009. May died in 2017 before the two could finalize their divorce.
