= Ralphie May =

American comedian (1972–2017)

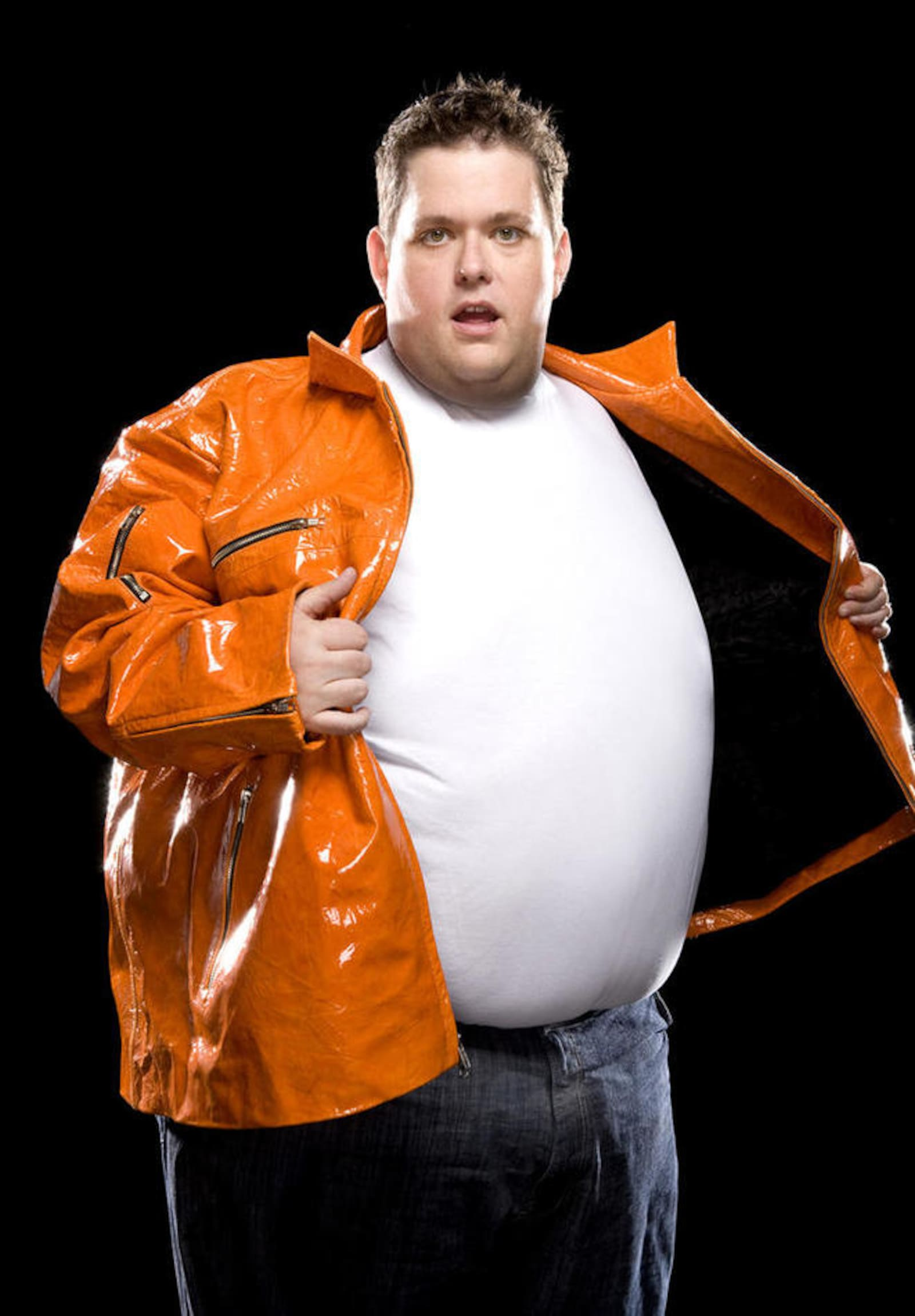
- Born: Ralph Duren May; February 17, 1972; Chattanooga, Tennessee, U.S.
- Died: October 6, 2017 (aged 45); Las Vegas, Nevada, U.S.
- Burial place: Oakland Memorial Cemetery; Clarksville, Arkansas
- Spouse: Lahna Turner (m. 2005)
- Children: 2

Comedy career
- Years active: 1989–2017
- Medium: Stand-up; television; radio
- Genre: Observational comedy
- Subjects: Wit; word play; satire; sexuality; race; religion; family life; obesity; politics; medicine
- Website: ralphiemay.com

Ralph Duren May (February 17, 1972 – October 6, 2017) was an American stand-up comedian and actor, known for his extensive touring and comedy specials on multiple media platforms.

== Early life ==
Ralphie May was born in Chattanooga, Tennessee, and raised in Clarksville, Arkansas. He was the youngest of five children.

At age 17, he won a contest to open for Sam Kinison, whom he considered his idol. May explained:

The joke that [Kinison] liked the best was [one I told] about the drummer [Rick Allen] from Def Leppard. "After he lost his arm, I felt bad about listening to him. Not that I'm prejudiced against handicapped people, it's just the fact that if I applauded, it was insulting to him, like 'Ha! Ha! Look at my use of two hands!'"

Kinison suggested that May move to Houston to further develop his comedy routine. May graduated from the Kinder High School for the Performing and Visual Arts.

== Career ==
In 2003, May was chosen to participate in the first season of Last Comic Standing. He finished in second place in the competition, with Dat Phan winning first place. Afterwards, May appeared in comedy shows, such as The Wayne Brady Show and The Tonight Show with Jay Leno. In 2005, he was the only white comedian on The Big Black Comedy Show, which also featured Mo'Nique, Rodman, and Vince Morris.

In 2005, May released his first comedy album Just Correct. He later recorded four Comedy Central specials titled Girth of a Nation (2006), Prime Cut (2007), Austin-tatious (2008), and Too Big To Ignore (2012), as well as two Netflix specials titled Imperfectly Yours (2013) and Unruly (2015). He appeared in For Da Love of Money. May also performed at the "Gathering of the Juggalos 2012".

== Personal life ==
On July 3, 2005, May married comedian Lahna Turner. The couple had two children, a daughter born in September 2007 and a son born in June 2009. The couple filed for divorce in October 2015 and sought joint custody of their children, but their separation could never be finalized.

May struggled with obesity throughout his life. He participated on VH1's Celebrity Fit Club and had gastric bypass surgery in 2004, which lowered his weight to 350 pounds (160 kg). After a bout with viral pneumonia on a cruise in October 2011, May lost 40 pounds (18 kg). The following month, he suffered a near-fatal pulmonary embolism, when a blood clot from his leg became lodged in an artery.

In many interviews, May discussed his grandmother, whom he credited with helping to care for his siblings and him when they were children. Speaking to the Arkansas Times in 2012, May said, "Thank goodness for my grandmother, she was a hell of a woman. She was really beneficial; she kept us in a stature way above our means and made sure we were taken care of as far as clean clothes and shoes." His Facebook biography also referred to his grandmother: "When I was a kid, my grandmother taught me how to crochet and how to quilt, and that's kind of how I do an act. I have one-liners, I have dirty jokes, but I also have long stories that are 10 or 20 minutes long and the laughs come every eight seconds. It's a different set. And it's a different life than most people have led."

In an interview with the Arkansas Times in 2012, he discussed growing up in Clarksville, shedding light on some of the hardships he faced. He said, "It was a hard life growing up. It was a similar story to a lot of people in Arkansas. My mom was a florist. I'm the youngest of four. My father and mother hated each other, and they took it out on us. She'd sue him for not paying child support, then he didn't pay, and that ended up costing us a lot."

In 2013, May and his wife Turner started a podcast together called Perfect 10.

May helped a choking child at Spokane Airport, Washington, in 2016, performing the Heimlich maneuver, news outlets and the airport's social media reported that he had saved the child's life.

His memoir, This Might Get a Little Heavy, was published posthumously in December 2017.

== Death ==
May died on October 6, 2017, aged 45, after going into cardiac arrest. He had been battling pneumonia for several weeks and as a result, had canceled shows over the previous month. As later published, hours before his death, May was scheduled to do a meet-and-greet after his final performance at Harrah's in Las Vegas around midnight, but he had already shown signs of his deteriorating condition.

A 2019 documentary titled What’s Eating Ralphie May? explored the final year of May’s life. The film received critical attention at festivals and was praised for its emotional depth and archival footage.

== Filmography ==
| Year | Title | Role | Notes |
|---|---|---|---|
| 2002 | For Da Love of Money | Otis | |
| 2003 | Just Correct | Himself | |
| 2003 | Whoopi | Sammy | Episode: "The Fat and the Frivolous" |
| 2005 | Big Black Comedy: Vol. 2 | Himself | |
| 2005 | Big Black Comedy: Vol. 4 | Himself | |
| 2006 | Girth of a Nation | Himself | |
| 2007 | Prime Cut | Himself | |
| 2007 | Bangin' With Ralphie May | Himself | |
| 2008 | The Best of Comics Unleashed With Byron Allen | Himself | |
| 2008 | Austin-Tatious | Himself | |
| 2012 | Too Big to Ignore | Himself | |
| 2013 | Imperfectly Yours | Himself | |
| 2013 | Squidbillies | P-NUT | Episode: "Thou Shale Not Drill" |
| 2015 | Unruly | Himself | |
| 2016 | Inside Amy Schumer | Ralphie | |
| 2016 | Jeff Ross Presents Roast Battle | Himself | 2 episodes - eliminated |
| 2017 | Penn & Teller: Fool Us | Himself | |
| 2018 | Ralphie May Presents | Himself | |
| 2019 | What's Eating Ralphie May? | Himself | |

== Discography ==
- 2005 Just Correct
- 2006 Girth of a Nation
- 2007 Prime Cut
- 2008 Austin-Tatious
- 2012 Too Big to Ignore
- 2013 Imperfectly Yours
- 2015 Unruly
