= Y'all (theater act) =

American neo-vaudeville country folk duo

Y'all were James Dean Jay Byrd and Steven Cheslik-DeMeyer, a neo-vaudeville country folk duo founded in New York in 1992. Their act incorporated original songs with stories based on a semi-fictionalized version of their own biographies. Many of the stories centered on Byrd's "lucky green dress," which, according to the lore they created, was given to him by a cross-dressing trailer salesman uncle and which Byrd continued to wear for luck. They released several albums on audiocassette and CD, published a novelized back story, performed in theaters, on television and radio, and in rock clubs, churches, retirement homes, and folk coffeehouses all over the United States, Canada, and the UK before separating in 2002. Y'all were compared to The Everly Brothers, the Louvin Brothers, the Smothers Brothers, Garrison Keillor, Simon & Garfunkel, the Magnetic Fields, They Might Be Giants, and Sonny & Cher.

Country harmonies were in their blood. Jay grew up in East Texas, the son of a country preacher. He didn't know who the Beatles were until he was 18—only gospel music was allowed in the house. Steven grew up without the benefit of church, but his mother's love for Johnny Cash and Loretta Lynn was nearly religious. Jay also inherited his father's gift of gab, which found its foil in Steven's deadpan shyness.

== Biography ==
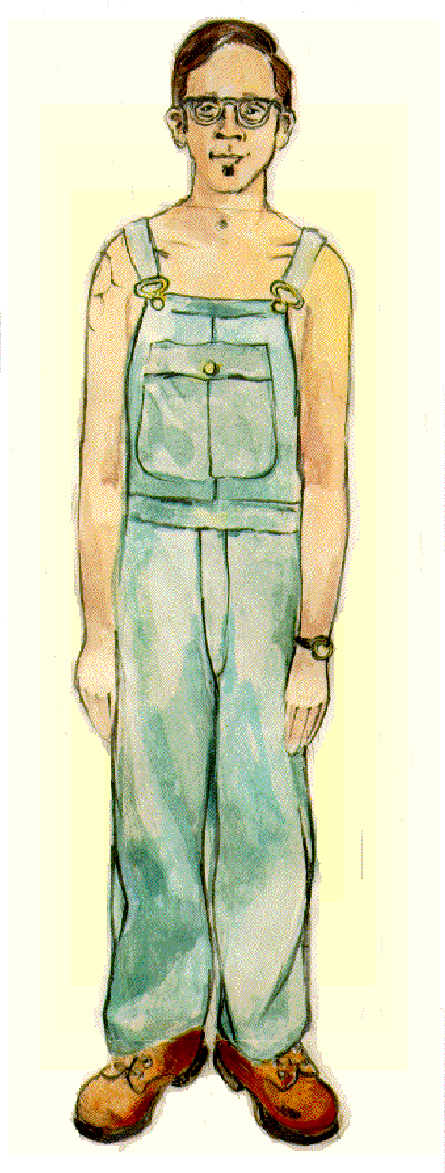
According to the Y'all story, Steven was born and raised on a farm in Kornflake, Indiana.

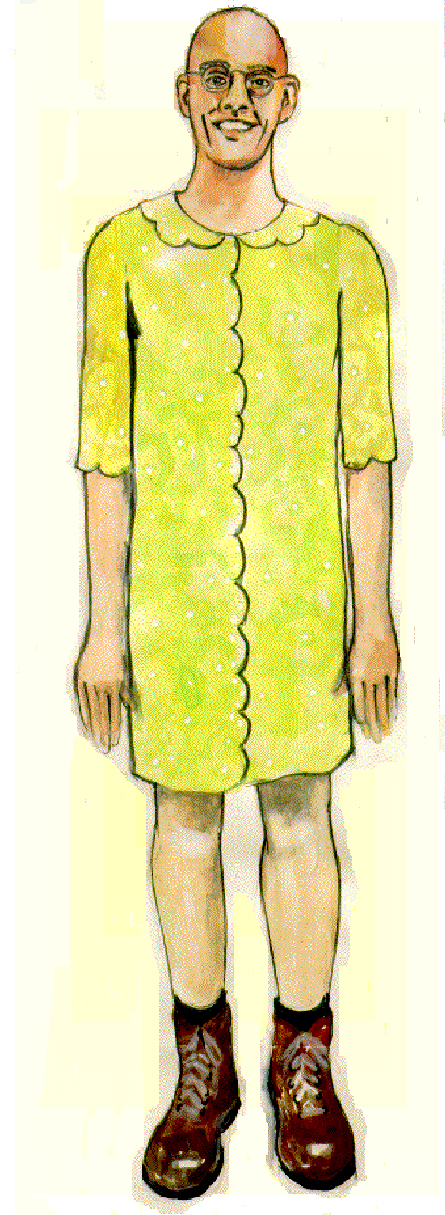
Jay's character was the son of a tent revival preacher in Okey-Dokey, Texas.

They met in New York City's downtown theater scene in May 1992 and almost immediately started making up songs together and singing in harmony for fun at parties or on their East Village stoop. In August 1992, three months after they met, they played together in public for the first time. At the time, they only had eight songs, so Jay filled in the set by telling fictionalized stories about his family in Texas.

The following summer, "An Evening of Stories & Songs with Y'all," debuted at the Duplex Cabaret in Greenwich Village and ran for several months. The show was a critical success and received Backstage Magazine's Bistro Award for Outstanding Musical Comedy, but Y'all's country roots ultimately led them away from the cabaret world, which was more accustomed to Gershwin and Sondheim than hillbilly music. Though they were both fans of Southern gospel and country music, Jay and Steven weren't aware at first of the many connections they had with early country performance styles. But folks began to compare them to the Louvin Brothers, the Stanley Brothers, Minnie Pearl, and the country comedy team Homer & Jethro, so they grabbed up recordings and studied them.

In 1993, Y'all released their first album, An Evening of Stories & Songs. 1994 brought a second album, The Next Big Thing, and a flurry of activity. They made an appearance on The Jon Stewart Show (Stewart's syndicated talk show), were named "Most Unusual Band" by MTV, based on a music video for their song, "The Egg Man", and began touring. They slipped easily into the Northeast/New England folk singer-songwriter circuit, where audiences appreciated their traditional acoustic sound, bright harmonies, and clever songwriting.

Around this time, Y'all launched their web site and newsletter, both of which established their style of marketing directly to their fans by sharing their lives.

Back home, Y'all continued their work in downtown theater in New York. They hosted a bi-monthly variety show at HERE Arts Center. Each episode started with a Smothers Brothers-esque opening number (the duo unable to get all the way through a song because of Jay Byrd's incessant chattiness, much to Steven's annoyance). The seeds were planted for Y'all's dream: to host their own national TV variety show. Jay Byrd and Steven's taste for the cameras was bolstered by appearances on Comedy Central's "Premium Blend," MTV's "Indie Outing," and a commercial for MTV2, which they were hired to write and perform.

Late in 1998, Y'all left New York City for Nashville, to be closer to the roots of the music they loved. And they expanded their touring base to include the Southeast and Midwest. In Nashville, Jay Byrd and Steven enlisted fiddle and steel player Fats Kaplin to produce a new recording, The "Hey, Y'all!" Soundtrack. The "Hey, Y'all!" Soundtrack, was another step toward their long-cherished dream of hosting a TV variety show. The CD opens with "The 'Hey, Y'all!' Theme Song," and is full of guest appearances by Nashville notables.

In 2000, Y'all self-published the autobiography of the semi-fictionalized characters they played on stage, The Good Book: the true story of Y'all, and released Y'allology, a retrospective CD of live recordings, radio cuts, and other recordings from their New York years. The hardcover first edition of The Good Book sold out, and a paperback edition was published in the spring of 2001.

Performing constantly but still unable to make ends meet, it occurred to them that there was one expense they hadn't given up: rent. So Jay and Steven sold almost everything they owned, bought a 20' travel trailer, and embarked on an open-ended road trip that would change their music, their career, and their life together. According to Byrd, "People kept asking, ‘How can you live in that little box?' but we lived in New York City for six years. Our apartment there wasn't any bigger, and it wasn't nearly as nice."

They always spent their time at home between tours doing the business of Y'all: the booking, promotion, and merchandising. Without access to their computer, telephone, and fax machine, they couldn't do that work on the road. A cell phone and laptop computer solved those problems. While Jay drove, Steven plugged his computer into the cigarette lighter and the van became a mobile office.

Almost simultaneously with their decision to pull up roots, Jay and Steven were invited to represent their church, the First Unitarian Universalist Church of Nashville, by performing at the Unitarian Universalist Association's annual convention, which happened to be in Nashville that year. Y'all were seen by thousands of Unitarians from all over North America. Y'all's irreverent humor and their message of inclusion fit perfectly with the liberal Unitarian tenets. Their performance struck a chord with this left-of-center family audience, and Y'all were invited to perform concerts and Sunday services at churches across the country.

Y'all left Nashville in January 2001 and drove west, across the Southwest desert to California and back for the first time. Summer and fall took them back to the Great Lakes and the Northeast, two old stomping grounds.

In 2001, a wealthy fan turned investor/angel (more angel than investor, since lending money to a folky cross-dressing duo who tour the country in a trailer performing in Unitarian churches is probably not an investment his accountant would have recommended) happened to see a documentary about Phranc, the lesbian folksinger turned Tupperware lady, and decided there should be a movie about Y'all. Rather than contemplate how to get a film crew into the trailer, Y'all's angel sent them a video camera and a computer for editing with the mandate to make a movie about their life on the road. They started shooting Life in a Box in January in New Orleans while recording a new CD.

Jay and Steven shed their dreams of fame along with their possessions when they hit the road. They realized everything they needed fit into the trailer: each other, their songs and stories, a guitar, and a baritone ukulele. Their last CD, Between the World and Me, a collection of Steven's more somber, introspective songs, has a more spare sound than their prior recordings.

In Joshua Tree, California, a year into their life on the road, Jay and Steven met Roger McKeever, a spiritual seeker who was living in a van with his Labrador Retriever and following the cactus blooms west from Colorado, making a meager living selling handmade jewelry and crafts. He had just pulled into town and happened into a café where Y'all were performing. Roger sold his van and moved in with Jay and Steven. "You make decisions quickly when you're only in one place for a few days before you move on," Steven said. Roger managed the merchandise, sold his wares alongside the Y'all CDs, books, and t-shirts, and was learning to play the bass guitar, hoping to join Jay and Steven on stage.

Y'all kept their fans current by chronicling their life in a weekly diary on their web site, luckygreendress.com. Hundreds of fans checked in regularly to find out where Y'all were each week, what they were eating, reading, thinking, and feeling, and what colorful characters they crossed paths with.

In the fall of 2002, Y'all played their final show in Ithaca, New York, on the long-running live radio folk program, Bound for Glory. Life in a Box, their documentary film chronicling Y'all's last years together and their separation, premiered in 2005 at the San Francisco International Film Festival and went on to screen in several festivals in the years following.

== Discography ==
- An Evening of Stories and Songs with Y'all, 1993
- The Next Big Thing, 1994
- Big Apple Pie (EP), 1995
- Christmastime in the Trailerpark (EP), 1995
- Y'allology, 1999
- The "Hey, Y'all!" Soundtrack, 2000
- Between the World and Me (Steven's Songs), 2001

== Books ==
- The Good Book: the true story of Y'all, 1999

== Films ==
Life in a Box, 2005
