= Esther Ku =

American comedian and actress (born 1980)

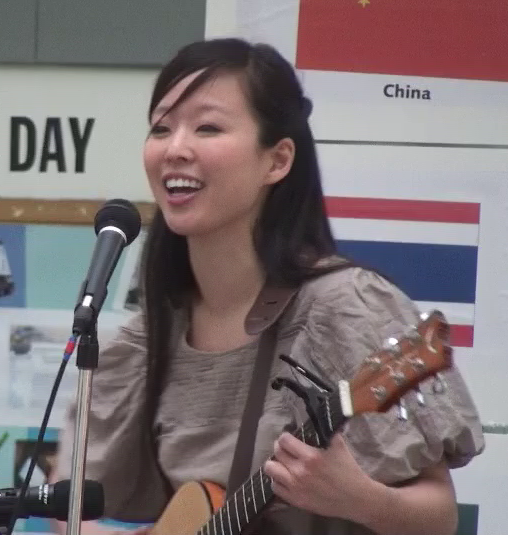
- Esther Ku in 2010
- Born: February 17, 1980 (age 46); Rogers Park, Illinois

Comedy career
- Years active: 2002–present
- Medium: Stand-up, television
- Website: funnyku.com

Esther Ku (born 17 February 1980) is an American comedian, television personality and actress. Ku was a cast member on the MTV shows Girl Code and Wild 'n Out. She was a finalist of Last Comic Standing, Showtime's AVN Awards Host, SAG Actor, host of Ku and the Gang Podcast.

== Early life ==
Ku was born in Rogers Park neighborhood of Chicago on February 17, 1980, to South Korean missionaries. She was raised in nearby Franklin Park, Illinois. She began doing comedy by joking with and about her parents. One of her idols is Joan Rivers.

During her childhood, her parents were a part of the University Bible Fellowship church, which had a location in River Grove, Illinois, which is next to Franklin Park. She was giving the name Lil' Esther Ku, being allowed to keep her first name since it was biblical. Ku made a TikTok series titled "I Grew Up In A Cult" where she talked about her experience and the practices they did.

In middle school, a librarian noticed her talent and recommended her to do the talent show that was going on. She attended East Leyden High School where she was a part of school newspaper, where students found her writing humorous.

Ku graduated from high school in 1998 attended the University of Illinois in Urbana, Illinois. She graduated with a bachelor's degree in marketing.

== Career ==
Ku started her comedy career in Boston, Massachusetts.

Ku was a featured performer at the New York Underground Comedy Festival and the Boston International Comedy Festival.

In 2008, Ku was the only female comedian from New York City to advance to the Las Vegas Semi-Finals of NBC's Last Comic Standing, becoming one of the top-ten finalists in Hollywood. Six months later, she was chosen as a finalist in the Hottest Funniest Chick Contest on the Howard Stern Show.

On July 29, 2015, Ku was a guest on the Joe Rogan Experience podcast episode #676. In 2017, she was a cast member on next-gen female comedy sketch called Sorry Not Sorry on Go90.com.

On January 28, Ku hosted the 2019 AVN Awards Show for Showtime. Cardi B was the musical guest, making this the first all-female-hosts line-up ever. Ku opened for Brian Regan in Florida at Hard Rock Live arena on December 8, 2021.

She was the host of her own podcast—Ku and the Gang, a pun on Kool and the Gang—from 2016 to 2018.

== Personal life ==
Ku lives in Brooklyn, New York. She has also worked in Queens, Harlem, and The Bronx.

== Filmography ==
Year	Title	Role	Notes
2010	The Umbrella	Ex-Girlfriend	Short film
2011	People We Know	Tammie Ko	Short film
2011	The Cookout 2	Ming Ling	Television film
2011	Climb It, Tarzan!	Pool Party Guest	
2014	Girl Code	Actress	Episode: "Picking-Up Guys, Getting Older, Sleeping"
2015	The Jack and Triumph Show	Tracy	3 episodes
2015	The Jim Gaffigan Show	Herself	Episode: "Maria"
2017	Sorry Not Sorry	Various	27 episodes
2018	Barbee Rehab	Korean Barbee #2	Episode: "The New Doctor is in..."
2018	Boy Band	Tina	
2019	Family Guy	Voice	Episode: "Christmas Is Coming"
