= Jessimae Peluso =

American actress

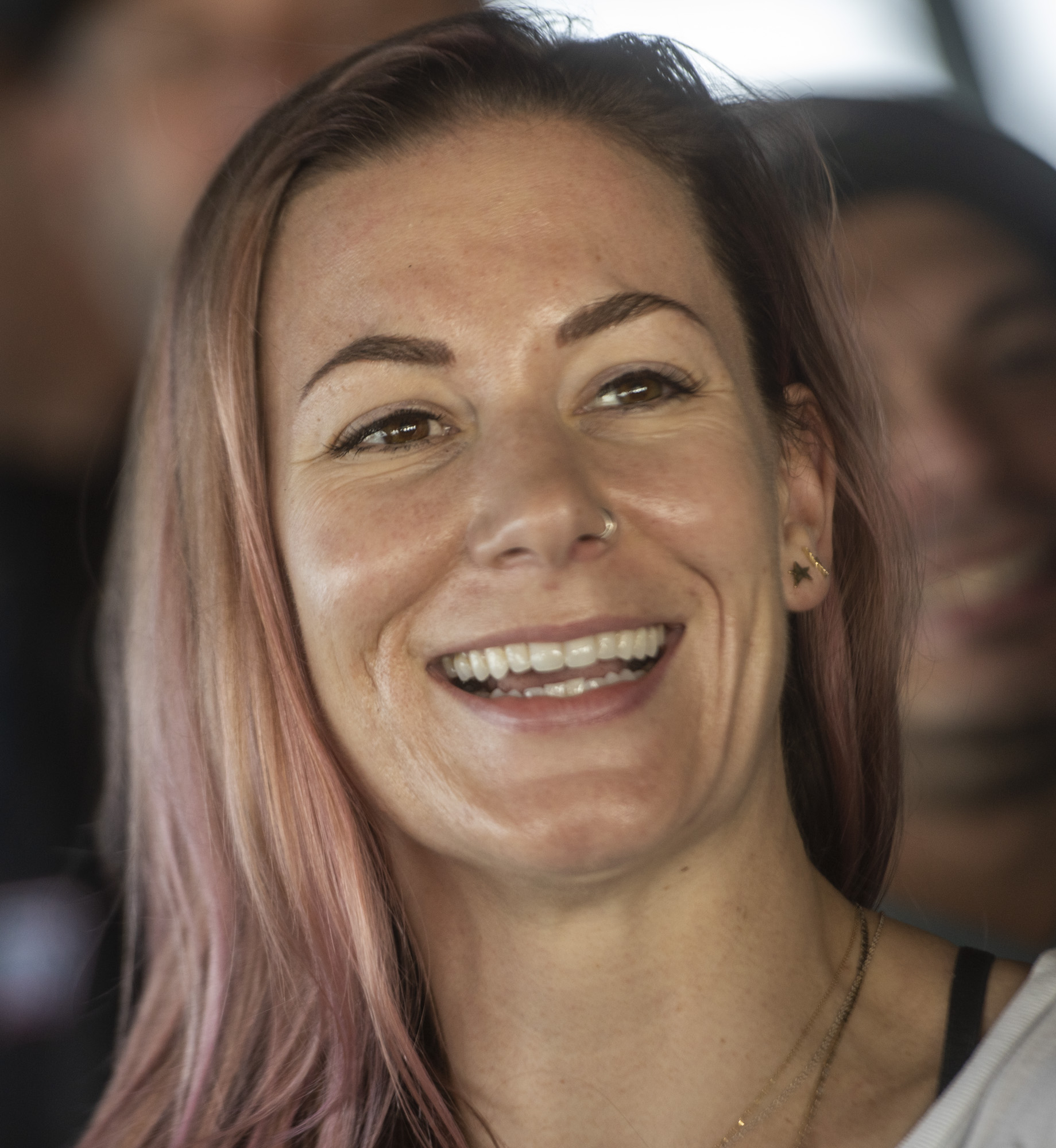
- Born: September 16, 1982 (age 44); Syracuse, New York, U.S.
- Notable work: Girl Code, Funny or Die, World's Funniest Fails

Comedy career
- Medium: Stand-up, sketch, television
- Genres: Observational comedy, current events, popular culture
- Website: jessimae.com

Jessimae Peluso (born September 16, 1982) is an American stand-up comedian and television personality. She is best known for being a cast member in the first two seasons of MTV's Girl Code.

== Biography ==
Jessimae Peluso was born in Syracuse, New York. She is of Italian descent. She went to Henninger High School, and graduated with the Class of 2000. Her first splash as a performer was as a dancer at the age of 16 for The United Booty Foundation, a theatrical production of retro disco and funk based out of Syracuse, NY. She started her comedy career in the Boston area performing improv comedy with The Tribe and standup comedy at the Cantab Lounge in Cambridge, Massachusetts. She moved to New York City in 2005.

In 2013, Peluso made her television debut when she became one of the cast members in MTV's Girl Code. She appeared in the first two seasons of the show, but left the show before the premiere of the third season.

Although she departed from Girl Code, Peluso continued to spread her humor using social media, such as Twitter and Instagram. Using her social media, she created a running gag about her having a "crush" on John Stamos. Stamos had acknowledged Peluso's humor and praised her for it.

Even after leaving Girl Code, Peluso kept a close relationship with former cast member, Carly Aquilino. They also have been touring different comedy clubs and doing stand-up shows together.

In 2021, she hosted the Netflix original series Tattoo Redo.
