= Comedy Central Records discography =

This is a comprehensive discography for Comedy Central Records, the record label of American cable channel Comedy Central.

== 2002 ==
Catalog #	Comedian / Artist	Album	Release date	Format	Notes
CCR0001	Crank Yankers	The Best Uncensored Crank Calls, Vol. 1	July 9, 2002	CD	
CCR0002	Jim Breuer	Smoke 'N' Breu	September 24, 2002	CD	
CCR0003	Jim Breuer	Hardcore	September 24, 2002	DVD	
CCR0004	Crank Yankers	The Best Crank Calls, Vol. 1	August 7, 2002	CD	censored version
CCR0005	Crank Yankers	The Best Uncensored Crank Calls, Vol. 2	November 5, 2002	CD	
CCR0006	Crank Yankers	The Best Crank Calls, Vol. 2	November 5, 2002	CD	censored version
CCR0007	Jim Breuer	Smoke 'N' Breu	December 3, 2002	CD	censored version
CCR0008	South Park	The Complete First Season: Episode Commentary	December 3, 2002	CD	

== 2003 ==
Catalog #	Comedian / Artist	Album	Release date	Format	Notes
CCR0009	Primetime Glick	The Best of Primetime Glick	May 6, 2003	DVD	
CCR0010	Insomniac with Dave Attell	The Best of Insomniac, Vol. 1	February 4, 2003	DVD	
CCR0011	Dave Attell	Skanks for the Memories...	February 4, 2003	CD	
CCR0012	Crank Yankers	The Best Uncensored Crank Calls, Vol. 3	April 22, 2003	CD	
CCR0014	David Alan Grier	The Book Of David: The Cult Figure's Manifesto	July 22, 2003	DVD	
CCR0015	Wanda Sykes	Tongue Untied	July 22, 2003	DVD	
CCR0016	Kevin James	Sweat the Small Stuff	July 22, 2003	DVD	
CCR0017	Dane Cook	Harmful If Swallowed	July 22, 2003	CD/DVD	
CCR0018	Bobcat Goldthwait	I Don't Mean to Insult You, But You Look Like Bobcat Goldthwait	September 23, 2003	CD	
CCR0019	Lewis Black	Unleashed	September 23, 2003	DVD	
CCR0020	Lewis Black	Rules of Enragement	September 23, 2003	CD	
CCR0021	Insomniac with Dave Attell	The Best of Insomniac, Vol. 2	October 21, 2003	DVD	
CCR0024	Mitch Hedberg	Mitch All Together	December 9, 2003	CD/DVD	
CCR0025	Mitch Hedberg	Strategic Grill Locations	December 9, 2003	CD	

== 2004 ==
Catalog #	Comedian / Artist	Album	Release date	Format	Notes	PR
CCR0027	Denis Leary	Merry F %$in' Christmas	November 16, 2004	CD		No
CCR0028	various artists	The Marijuana-Logues	December 14, 2004	CD		
CCR0029	Jim Gaffigan	Doing My Time	December 7, 2004	CD/DVD		
CCR0030	Todd Barry	Falling off the Bone	December 7, 2004	CD/DVD		
CCR0031	Ant	Follow My Ass	December 14, 2004	CD		

== 2005 ==
Catalog #	Comedian / Artist	Album	Release date	Format	Notes	PR
CCR0026	D.L. Hughley	Notes from the G.E.D. Section	June 21, 2005	CD		
CCR0033	Lewis Black	Luther Burbank Performing Arts Center Blues	January 25, 2005	CD		
CCR0034	Dane Cook	Retaliation	July 26, 2005	2 CD/DVD		
CCR0035	Todd Barry	Medium Energy	October 25, 2005	CD		
CCR0036	Daniel Tosh	True Stories I Made Up	November 8, 2005	CD/DVD		
CCR0037	Harland Williams	Har-Larious	November 22, 2005	CD		
CCR0038	various artists	Invite Them Up	December 6, 2005	3CD/DVD		

== 2006 ==
Catalog #	Comedian / Artist	Album	Release date	Format	Notes	PR
CCR0039	Jim Gaffigan	Beyond the Pale	February 7, 2006	CD		
CCR0040	Mike Birbiglia	Two Drink Mike	February 7, 2006	CD/DVD		
CCR0041	Lewis Black	The Carnegie Hall Performance	April 25, 2006	2 CD		
CCR0042	Kyle Cease	One Dimple	July 11, 2006	CD/DVD		
CCR0043	Norm Macdonald	Ridiculous	September 12, 2006	CD		
CCR0044	Demetri Martin	These Are Jokes	September 26, 2006	CD/DVD		
CCR0045	Greg Giraldo	Good Day to Cross a River	October 24, 2006	CD		
CCR0046	Pleaseeasaur	The Amazing Adventures of Pleaseeasaur	October 24, 2006	CD/DVD		
CCR0047	Christian Finnegan	Two for Flinching	October 24, 2006	CD		
CCR0048	various artists	Double Chunk		2 CD	Compilation	

== 2007 ==
Catalog #	Comedian / Artist	Album	Release date	Format	Notes	PR
CCR0049	Joe Rogan	Shiny Happy Jihad	April 10, 2007	CD		
CCR0050	Christopher Titus	The 5th Annual End of The World Tour	April 10, 2007	2 CD		
CCR0051	Dane Cook	Rough Around the Edges: Live From Madison Square Garden	November 13, 2007	CD/DVD		
CCR0052	Mike Birbiglia	My Secret Public Journal Live	September 25, 2007	CD		
CCR0053	various artists	Comedy Death-Ray	September 11, 2007	2 CD		
CCR0054	Steven Wright	I Still Have a Pony	September 25, 2007	CD		
CCR0055	Michael Ian Black	I Am a Wonderful Man	September 25, 2007	CD		
CCR0056	Nick Swardson	Party	October 23, 2007	CD/DVD		
CCR0057	George Lopez	America's Mexican	October 9, 2007	CD		
CCR0059	God's Pottery	Live at Comix	December 4, 2007	digital EP		
CCR0061	Mike Birbiglia	"Medium Man Song"	December 18, 2007	digital single		
CCR0062	Hard n' Phirm	Horses and Grasses	December 18, 2007	digital album		

== 2008 ==
Catalog #	Comedian / Artist	Album	Release date	Format	Notes	PR
CCR0058	Dane Cook	Vicious Circle	January 29, 2008	digital album		
CCR0060	Josh Sneed	Unacceptable	September 30, 2008	digital album		
CCR0063	Mitch Hedberg	Do You Believe In Gosh?	September 9, 2008	CD	posthumous album	
CCR0064	Dov Davidoff	The Point Is...	April 22, 2008	CD		
CCR0065	Todd Barry	From Heaven	March 4, 2008	CD		
CCR0066	Robert Kelly	Just the Tip	April 8, 2008	CD/DVD		
CCR0067	Christopher Titus	Norman Rockwell Is Bleeding	July 22, 2008	2 CD		
CCR0068	Bo Burnham	Bo Fo Sho	June 17, 2008	digital EP		
CCR0069	Lewis Black	Anticipation	August 5, 2008	CD		
CCR0070	Stephen Colbert	A Colbert Christmas: The Greatest Gift of All!	November 25, 2008	digital album	soundtrack	
CCR0072	Aaron Karo	Just Go Talk to Her	December 8, 2008	digital album		

== 2009 ==
Catalog #	Comedian / Artist	Album	Release date	Format	Notes	PR
CCR0071	Big Jay Oakerson	An American Storyteller	July 21, 2009	digital album		
CCR0073	Denis Leary	At the Rehab	March 24, 2009	digital single		
CCR0074	Todd Glass	Thin Pig	July 7, 2009	digital album		
CCR0075	Maria Bamford	Unwanted Thoughts Syndrome	April 21, 2009	CD/DVD		
CCR0076	Movits!	Äppelknyckarjazz	July 29, 2009	digital album	Not comedy related	
CCR0077	John Mulaney	The Top Part	March 24, 2009	CD		
CCR0078	Bo Burnham	Bo Burnham	March 10, 2009	CD/DVD		
CCR0079	Jim Gaffigan	King Baby	March 31, 2009	CD		
CCR0080	Matt Braunger	Soak Up The Night	July 14, 2009	digital album		
CCR0081	Greg Warren	One Star Wonder	June 23, 2009	digital album		
CCR0082	Christopher Titus	Love Is Evol	February 17, 2009	2 CD		
CCR0084	Doug Benson	Unbalanced Load	August 4, 2009	CD		
CCR0085	Dane Cook	Isolated Incident	May 19, 2009	CD/DVD		
CCR0087	JP Incorporated	An Album of Distinction	August 4, 2009	digital album		
CCR0088	George Lopez	Tall, Dark & Chicano	December 15, 2009	CD		
CCR0089	Nick Swardson	Seriously, Who Farted?	October 13, 2009	CD		
CCR0090	Greg Giraldo	Midlife Vices	October 20, 2009	CD		

== 2010 ==
Catalog #	Comedian / Artist	Album	Release date	Format	Notes	PR
CCR0083	Aziz Ansari	Intimate Moments for a Sensual Evening	January 19, 2010	CD/DVD, LP		
CCR0086	Nick Thune	Thick Noon	February 23, 2010	CD/DVD		
CCR0091	Joe Rogan	Talking Monkeys In Space	March 30, 2010	CD		
CCR0092	Drawn Together	The Uncensored Soundtrack	April 20, 2010	CD	Soundtrack	
CCR0093	Joe DeRosa	The Depression Auction	June 22, 2010	digital album		
CCR0094	Shane Mauss	Jokes to Make My Parents Proud	March 9, 2010	digital album		
CCR0096	Songs of The Sarah Silverman Program	From Our Rears To Your Ears	March 2, 2010	CD	Soundtrack	
CCR0097	various artists	The Awkward Comedy Show	April 6, 2010	digital album		
CCR0098	Reggie Watts	Why $#!+ So Crazy?	May 18, 2010	CD/DVD		
CCR0099	Denis Leary	"F.U." (feat. The Rehab Horns)	May 17, 2010	digital single		
CCR0100	Lewis Black	Stark Raving Black	June 15, 2010	CD		
CCR0101	Bo Burnham	Words Words Words	October 19, 2010	CD		
CCR0102	Kevin Hart	Seriously Funny	July 20, 2010	CD		
CCR0103	Anthony Jeselnik	Shakespeare	September 21, 2010	digital album, CD	re-released on CD, August 7, 2012	
CCR0104	Doug Benson	Hypocritical Oaf	August 31, 2010	CD/DVD		
CCR0106	Denis Leary	"Bless Me Father"	August 17, 2010	digital single		
CCR0107	GoRemy	The Falafel Album	September 14, 2010	digital EP		
CCR0112	MC Mr. Napkins	MC Mr. Napkins: The Album	November 30, 2010	digital album		
CCR0113	Stephen, Jon & Steve (feat. Tay Zonday)	"Everybody's Talking 'Bout Sully"	October 21, 2010	digital single		
CCR0119	Dane Cook	I Did My Best - Greatest Hits	November 22, 2010	2 CD	Compilation	

== 2011 ==
Catalog #	Comedian / Artist	Album	Release date	Format	Notes	PR
CCR0105	Denis Leary	"Douchebag"	January 11, 2011	digital single	single, remix and music video	
CCR0108	Kurt Metzger	Talks to Young People About Sex	June 28, 2011	digital album		
CCR0109	Dan Levy	Congrats On Your Success!	August 16, 2011	CD/DVD		
CCR0114	Louis C.K.	Hilarious	January 11, 2011	CD		
CCR0115	Eddie Griffin	You Can Tell 'Em I Said It	February 22, 2011	digital album		
CCR0116	Daniel Tosh	Happy Thoughts	March 8, 2011	CD		
CCR0117	Mike Birbiglia	Sleepwalk With Me Live	April 19, 2011	CD		
CCR0118	Amy Schumer	Cutting	April 26, 2011	digital album, CD	Re-released on CD, November 6, 2012	
CCR0120	Louis Katz	If These Balls Could Talk	March 8, 2011	digital album		
CCR0121	Natasha Leggero	Coke Money	March 22, 2011	digital album		
CCR0122	Marc Maron	This Has to Be Funny	August 9, 2011	CD		
CCR0123	Rachel Feinstein	Thug Tears	November 29, 2011	digital album		
CCR0124	Mo Mandel	The M Word	November 8, 2011	digital album		
CCR0125	Christopher Titus	Neverlution	June 28, 2011	2 CD		
CCR0126	Norm Macdonald	Me Doing Stand-Up	June 14, 2011	CD		
CCR0127	Tommy Johnagin	Stand Up Comedy 2	June 21, 2011	digital album		
CCR0128	Doug Benson	Potty Mouth	August 30, 2011	CD/DVD		
CCR0130	Lewis Black	The Prophet	September 27, 2011	CD		
CCR0131	Wyatt Cenac	Comedy Person	August 23, 2011	CD		
CCR0132	T.J. Miller	The Extended Play E.P.	September 13, 2011	CD		
CCR0133	Michael Ian Black	Very Famous	August 9, 2011	CD		
CCR0134	The Beards of Comedy	Cardio Mix	November 22, 2011	digital album		
CCR0135	Patton Oswalt	Finest Hour	September 20, 2011	CD		
CCR0136	Joe DeRosa	Return of the Son of Depression Auction	September 6, 2011	digital album		
CCR0138	Pete Holmes	Impregnated With Wonder	November 15, 2011	digital album		
CCR0139	Ryan Stout	Touché	December 6, 2011	digital album		
CCR0140	Carlos Mencia	New Territory	December 6, 2011	digital album		
CCR0141	Joberg & Gurner	Manhood	December 13, 2011	digital album		

== 2012 ==
Catalog #	Comedian / Artist	Album	Release date	Format	Notes	PR
CCR0095	Kyle Cease	I Highly Recommend This	September 4, 2012	CD/DVD		
CCR0129	Gary Gulman	No Can Defend	June 5, 2012	digital album		
CCR0137	John Mulaney	New In Town	January 31, 2012	CD		
CCR0142	Tom Papa	Live from New York City	January 10, 2012	digital album		
CCR0143	Jo Koy	Lights Out	April 3, 2012	digital album		
CCR0144	Sinbad	Afros + Bellbottoms	April 10, 2012	digital album		
CCR0145	Sinbad	Nothin' But The Funk	April 10, 2012	digital album		
CCR0146	Sinbad	Son of a Preacher Man	April 10, 2012	digital album		
CCR0147	Reggie Watts	A Live at Central Park	May 15, 2012	CD/DVD		
CCR0148	Eddie Griffin	Freedom of Speech	April 17, 2012	digital album		
CCR0149	Katt Williams	Pimpadelic	April 17, 2012	digital album		
CCR0150	Lewis Black	In God We Rust	September 11, 2012	CD		
CCR0151	Sommore	The Queen Stands Alone	April 17, 2012	digital album		
CCR0152	Steve Harvey	Don't Trip... He Ain't Through With Me Yet!	April 24, 2012	digital album		
CCR0153	Steve Harvey	Still Trippin'	April 24, 2012	digital album		
CCR0154	Hannibal Buress	Animal Furnace	May 22, 2012	CD		
CCR0155	Todd Barry	Super Crazy	July 24, 2012	CD		
CCR0156	George Lopez	It's Not Me, It's You	September 25, 2012	CD		
CCR0157	Jesse Popp	You Stink	June 12, 2012	digital album		
CCR0158	Doug Benson	Smug Life	July 3, 2012	2 CD		
CCR0160	Matt Braunger	Shovel Fighter	July 17, 2012	digital album		
CCR0161	South Park	"San Diego"	September 18, 2012	digital single, vinyl single		
CCR0162	Key & Peele	"Shot in the Dick"	September 18, 2012	digital single		
CCR0164	Demetri Martin	Standup Comedian	October 2, 2012	CD		
CCR0166	Aziz Ansari	Dangerously Delicious	May 20, 2012	digital album		
CCR0167	Rob Delaney	Live at the Bowery Ballroom	November 13, 2012	digital album		
CCR0169	Jim Gaffigan	Mr. Universe	August 28, 2012	CD		
CCR0172	T.J. Miller	Mash Up Audiofile	November 13, 2012	digital album		

== 2013 ==
Catalog #	Comedian / Artist	Album	Release date	Format	Notes	PR
CCR0163	Chris Hardwick	Mandroid	January 22, 2013	CD		
CCR0165	Eugene Mirman	An Evening of Comedy In a Fake Underground Laboratory	February 5, 2013	CD/DVD		
CCR0168	Anthony Jeselnik	Caligula	January 15, 2013	CD		
CCR0170	Kyle Kinane	Whiskey Icarus	November 27, 2013	CD/DVD		
CCR0171	Maria Bamford	Ask Me About My New God!	July 16, 2013	CD/DVD		
CCR0175	Trevor Moore	Drunk Texts to Myself	March 26, 2013	CD		
CCR0176	Al Madrigal	Why Is the Rabbit Crying?	April 30, 2013	CD		
CCR0177	Pete Holmes	Nice Try, The Devil	May 14, 2013	CD/DVD		
CCR0178	Owen Benjamin	High Five Til It Hurts	July 2, 2013	CD/DVD		
CCR0179	Kumail Nanjiani	Beta Male	June 25, 2013	CD/DVD		
CCR0181	Mike Lawrence	Sadamantium	May 28, 2013	digital album		
CCR0182	Myq Kaplan	Meat Robot	June 11, 2013	digital album		
CCR0183	Key & Peele	"Just Stay for the Night"	September 24, 2013	digital single		
CCR0185	Gabriel Iglesias	Aloha Fluffy	September 24, 2013	2 CD		
CCR0187	Dane Cook	Harmful If Swallowed (10th Anniversary Limited Edition)	November 26, 2013	LP	limited edition of 1,000 vinyl copies	
CCR0188	Christopher Titus	Voice In My Head	October 8, 2013	2 CD		
CCR0190	Bill Cosby	Far from Finished	November 24, 2013	CD		
CCR0191	Steve Rannazzisi	Manchild	November 19, 2013	digital album		
CCR0193	Chris D'Elia	White Male. Black Comic.	December 10, 2013	CD/DVD		
CCR0197	Bo Burnham	what.	December 17, 2013	digital album		

== 2014 ==
Catalog #	Comedian / Artist	Album	Release date	Format	Notes	PR
CCR0192	Neal Brennan	Women and Black Dudes	January 21, 2014	digital album		
CCR0194	Patton Oswalt	Tragedy Plus Comedy Equals Time	April 8, 2014	CD/DVD		
CCR0195	Tracy Morgan	Bona Fide	April 18, 2014	digital album		
CCR0196	Marc Maron	Thinky Pain	May 2, 2014	CD/LP		
CCR0199	Hannibal Buress	Live from Chicago	April 1, 2014	digital album		
CCR0201	Nick Thune	Folk Hero	March 11, 2014	digital album/LP		
CCR0202	Dan Mintz	The Stranger	October 7, 2014	CD		
CCR0203	David Spade	My Fake Problems	May 2, 2014	digital album		
CCR0204	Kurt Metzger	White Precious	July 11, 2014	digital album		
CCR0205	Sinbad	Make Me Wanna Holla	June 13, 2014	digital album		
CCR0208	Jim Gaffigan	Obsessed	April 25, 2014	CD/LP		
CCR0210	Jeff Dunham	I Was Wrong	March 21, 2014	digital single		
CCR0211	Nick Kroll	Thank You, Very Cool	March 25, 2014	digital album		
CCR0212	Kyle Kinane	Whiskey Icarus	July 11, 2014	LP	vinyl re-issue	
CCR0213	Whitney Cummings	I Love You	June 27, 2014	digital album		
CCR0214	Mark Normand	Still Got It!	July 11, 2014	digital album		
CCR0215	Cristela Alonzo	Some of the Hits	October 31, 2014	digital album		
CCR0216	Nick Vatterott	For Amusement Only	October 31, 2014	digital album		
CCR0218	Big Jay Oakerson	The Crowd Work Sessions: What's Your F@!?#ng Deal?!	November 17, 2014	digital album		
CCR0219	Artie Lange	The Stench of Failure	October 17, 2014	digital album		
CCR0221	Joe Rogan	Rocky Mountain High	November 24, 2014	digital album		
CCR0222	Kyle Dunnigan	Craig's All Star, Rockin' Christmas, You Guys!	November 24, 2014	digital album		
CCR0223	Key & Peele	"Where You At?"	September 19, 2014	digital single		
CCR0224	Kroll Show	For The Record	December 5, 2014	digital album		

== 2015 ==
Catalog #	Comedian / Artist	Album	Release date	Format	Notes	PR
CCR0233	Ari Shaffir	Paid Regular	January 20, 2015	digital album		
CCR0227	Kyle Kinane	I Liked His Old Stuff Better	January 27, 2015	digital album		
CCR0225	Aziz Ansari	Buried Alive	February 3, 2015	digital album		
CCR0230	Nate Bargatze	Full Time Magic	March 5, 2015	digital album		
CCR0229	Trevor Moore	High In Church	March 10, 2015	digital album		
CCR0228	Kyle Kinane	I Liked His Old Stuff Better	April 18, 2015	Vinyl Re-issue		
CCR0241	Amy Schumer	Girl You Don't Need Makeup	April 30, 2015	Single Release		
CCR0234	Nick Swardson	Taste It	June 2, 2015	digital album		
CCR0239	Christopher Titus	Angry Pursuit Of Happiness	June 4, 2015	digital album		
CCR0226	Aziz Ansari	Buried Alive	July 10, 2015	Vinyl Re-issue		
CCR0237	Bridget Everett	Gynecological Wonder	July 17, 2015	digital album		
CCR0243	Liza Treyger	Glittercheese	August 21, 2015	digital album		
CCR0235	Natasha Leggero	Live At Bimbo's	August 22, 2015	digital album		
CCR0244	Michelle Buteau	Shut Up	September 3, 2015	digital album		
CCR0236	Steve Rannazzisi	Breaking Dad	September 19, 2015	digital album		
CCR0245	Randy Liedtke	I'm On A Roll	October 9, 2015	digital album		
CCR0242	Sam Morril	Class Act	October 23, 2015	digital album		
CCR0246	Sean Donnelly	Manuel Labor Face	November 13, 2015	digital album		
CCR0247	Andrew Santino	Say No More	November 27, 2015	digital album		
CCR0248	Brian Regan	Live From Radio City Music Hall	November 27, 2015	digital album		
CCR0238	Kyle Kinane	Sold Out, Suck It	December 23, 2015	digital album		

== 2016 ==
Catalog #	Comedian / Artist	Album	Release date	Format	Notes	PR
CCR0231	Brian Regan	Standing Up	February 16, 2016	digital album		
CCR0232	Brian Regan	Epitome Of Hyperbole	February 16, 2016	digital album		
CCR0250	Jim Jefferies	Bare	February 16, 2016	digital album		
CCR0255	Nikki Glaser	Perfect	April 12, 2016	digital album		
CCR0251	Daniel Tosh	People Pleaser	April 19, 2016	digital album		
CCR0256	Rachel Feinstein	Only Whores Wear Purple	April 26, 2016	digital album		
CCR0257	Chris Hardwick	Funcomfortable	May 2, 2016	digital album	Deluxe edition	
