= Jack Vaughn Jr. =

American producer

- Born: January 27, 1974 (age 52); New York City, New York, U.S.
- Occupations: Music executive Television producer
- Parent: Jack Vaughn

Jack Vaughn Jr. (born January 27, 1974) is an American multi-Grammy winning record and television producer and label head. He created and ran Comedy Central Records, Slimstyle Records, and Third World Underground, and ran Comedy Dynamics producing television specials and albums.

In 2016, he joined SiriusXM as the SVP in charge of their comedy channels. He also co-owns the Vaughn Land And Cattle production company with his wife, Hanne Vaughn, and produces the television series Gary Busey: Pet Judge and other projects.

== Filmography and discography ==
=== Discography ===
Year	Artist	Album	Role
2003	Dave Attell	Skanks For The Memories	Producer
2003	Lewis Black	Rules of Enragement	Executive Producer
2004	Denis Leary	Merry F#%$in' Christmas	Executive Producer
2004	Various Artists	The Marijuana-Logues	Producer
2004	Jim Gaffigan	Doing My Time	Producer
2006	Lewis Black	Luther Burbank Performing Arts Center Blues	Executive Producer
2006	Jim Gaffigan	Beyond the Pale	Executive Producer
2006	Lewis Black	The Carnegie Hall Performance	Executive Producer
2006	Kyle Cease	One Dimple	Producer
2006	Demetri Martin	These Are Jokes	Producer
2006	Dane Cook	Dane Cook: Vicious Circle	Producer
2007	Greg Girlado	Good Day To Cross A River	Producer
2007	Joe Rogan	Shiny Happy Jihad	Producer
2007	Nick Swardson	Party	Producer
2007	Dane Cook	Rough Around the Edges: Live from Madison Square Garden	Producer
2008	Mitch Hedberg	Do You Believe in Gosh?	Producer
2008	Bo Burnham	Bo fo Sho	Producer
2008	Lewis Black	Anticipation	Executive Producer
2008	Various Artists	A Colbert Christmas: The Greatest Gift of All!	Executive Producer
2009	Maria Bamford	Unwanted Thoughts Syndrome	Producer
2009	Bo Burnham	Bo Burnham	Producer
2009	Jim Gaffigan	King Baby	Producer
2009	Doug Benson	Unbalanced Load	Producer
2009	Dane Cook	Isolated Incident	Producer
2009	Greg Giraldo	Midlife Vices	Producer
2010	Aziz Ansari	Intimate Moments for a Sensual Evening	Producer
2010	Nick Thune	Thick Noon	Producer
2010	Bo Burnham	Words Words Words	Producer
2010	Anthony Jeselnik	Shakespeare	Producer
2010	Doug Benson	Hypocritical Oaf	Producer
2010	Louis C.K.	Hilarious	Album Producer
2011	Norm Macdonald	Me Doing Standup	Album Producer
2011	Pete Holmes	Impregnated with Wonder	Producer

== See also ==
- Comedy Central Records
- Comedy Central Records discography
- New Wave Dynamics
- Jack Vaughn
