= Dan Schlissel =

American record label owner and producer

- Born: November 9, 1970 (age 56); Worcester, Massachusetts, U.S.
- Occupations: record label owner, record producer
- Years active: 1992–present
- Known for: Stand Up! Records, -ismist Recordings
- Awards: Grammy Award for Best Comedy Album, 2006 (Lewis Black, The Carnegie Hall Performance) and 2 nominations

Dan Schlissel (born November 9, 1970) is an American record producer from Minneapolis, Minnesota, and founder of the record labels Stand Up! Records, which specializes in comedy, and -ismist Recordings, which focused on punk and alternative rock from Nebraska and nearby Midwestern states. Schlissel won a Grammy as producer of Lewis Black's 2006 album The Carnegie Hall Performance, and was nominated for his work on Black's two Grammy-nominated albums, Luther Burbank Performing Arts Center Blues and Anticipation. He is known for his work with Black and other comics including Doug Stanhope, Maria Bamford, Marc Maron, and Mitch Hedberg, and helping release the debut record of Iowa metal band Slipknot.

Comedian and actor Marc Maron, who released his first three albums on Stand Up!, described Schlissel as "a guy who loves comedy, and is very attentive to the process of recording comedy," and, referencing the large number of noteworthy comics who were given important exposure in their early careers by the label, joked that "you've done everybody's first two records."

== Early life ==
Schlissel was born in Worcester, Massachusetts to Israeli immigrants Sam and Helena Schlissel. His father, born in Poland, was a Holocaust survivor who worked in the textile industry, and his mother was a native Israeli. His first language was Hebrew. His family moved up and down the East Coast when he was a child, living in New Jersey and Pennsylvania, and frequently visiting relatives in the Bronx, where Schlissel first discovered comedy via Saturday Night Live's first season and Johnny Carson's Tonight Show. Another early comedy influence was Monty Python-esque Israeli group HaGashash HaHiver, who performed in Hebrew, as well as the Marx Brothers, Charlie Chaplin, Abbott and Costello, Buster Keaton, Eddie Murphy's Comedian, and Woody Allen and Jackie Mason's standup albums. He cites Rodney Dangerfield's No Respect as his favorite comedy album.

In 1982, his family moved to Kearney, Nebraska, where he spent his teenage years. In 1988, he enrolled at the University of Nebraska–Lincoln, where he graduated with a Bachelor of Science degree in physics.

== -ismist Recordings ==
In 1992, inspired by the success of indie music labels such as Sub Pop, he founded the label which would eventually become -ismist Recordings, at first basing the business out of his dorm room. Over the 1990s, -ismist released nearly 80 albums and singles by Midwestern bands including Killdozer, Season to Risk, and House of Large Sizes, beginning with Nebraska indie-rock bands including Such Sweet Thunder. Schlissel, via -ismist, also distributed other Midwestern indie labels and organized two music festivals in 1996 and 1997. Schlissel helped then-unknown Iowa metal band Slipknot release its first album, Mate.Feed.Kill.Repeat, which it had originally self-pressed. Schlissel and -ismist distributed the last third of the 1,000-copy run of the album, and helped the band get its first significant notice from music critics and radio airplay.

Slipknot later moved on to major label Roadrunner Records, and Schlissel became disillusioned with running a music label; he moved to Minneapolis in 1998 to take a job at a software company. He considered folding -ismist, but instead found new focus after convincing Lewis Black to work with him after meeting the comedian after a show.

Schlissel recorded Black's The White Album in Madison, Wisconsin, in 1999, with John Machnik, who would be his production partner for many years. Released on -ismist, the album was an immediate success, eventually selling around 60,000 copies, more than the entire previous -ismist catalog combined. The label would go on to release several other comedy albums, including two by Doug Stanhope, Sicko and Something to Take the Edge Off, and Jimmy Shubert's Animal Instincts, while Schlissel launched a new label, Stand Up! Records, in 2000. By 2002, -ismist had effectively closed down and been replaced by Stand Up! Records.

== Stand Up! Records ==
Stand Up! has released more than 200 comedy albums and videos since its founding in 2000, including albums by Black, Stanhope, Patton Oswalt, Greg Proops, David Cross, Maria Bamford, Hannibal Buress, Judy Gold, the Sklar Brothers, and Eddie Pepitone.

A relatively small operation, the label is run almost entirely by Schlissel, who also served as recording engineer and producer on many of the label's albums. The label has been praised for bringing an independent approach to the comedy genre, inspired by Schlissel's roots in punk and indie rock. Henry Owings, founder of humor magazine Chunklet, stated that Schlissel "has done a great job trying to reintroduce some fresh blood into comedy albums. … If anybody's trying to bring back the idea of comedy albums being something that should be looked at in the same light as a music album, it's him."

Through Stand Up! Records, Schlissel produced the feature-length documentary 'ReConquistador' starring Daniel Lobell, and edited by Bruno Kohfield-Galeano. The film was accepted into multiple film festivals and had many screenings which included both Leammle theaters.

== Other work ==
=== Record producing ===
In addition to being Stand Up!'s label head, Schlissel was also producer and recording engineer on many of the label's releases. He has also produced albums for other labels.

Even after Lewis Black moved to the larger Comedy Central Records label, he continued to work with Schlissel, who produced or edited four more Black albums in the mid-2000s, Rules of Enragement, Luther Burbank Performing Arts Center Blues, The Carnegie Hall Performance, and Anticipation. Of these, Carnegie Hall won a Grammy Award for Best Comedy Album, while Luther Burbank and Anticipation were both nominated in that category. Stand Up! also released the vinyl editions of Luther Burbank Performing Arts Center Blues and Rules of Enragement.

Also for Comedy Central Records, Schlissel was the recording engineer on Mitch Hedberg's last album, Mitch All Together, which was recorded live in 2003 in Minneapolis, and produced Hannibal Buress' Animal Furnace and Ryan Stout's Touché. He was also recording engineer on Mitch Fatel's Miniskirts and Muffins, Dan Cummins' Revenge is Near, and Nick DiPaolo's Funny How?, and edited Ben Roy's I Got Demons.

=== Akumal Comedy Festival ===
From 2012 to 2015, Stand Up! hosted the annual Akumal Comedy Festival in Mexico, a nonprofit event held in Tulum, Playa del Carmen, and Akumal which raised money for the Mexican Red Cross. The festival featured comics performing in both English and Spanish. Headliners included Darryl Lenox, Maggie Faris, and Derek Sheen. The festival was co-founded by Schlissel and Twin Cities comic Gus Lynch, who also acted in the films Saving Silverman, North Country, and I Spy. Lynch died after an accidental fall at the Mayan ruins at Coba in 2014; the final festival was held in his honor.

=== Scottish tartan ===
In 2018, during the label's first visit to the Edinburgh Festival Fringe, Schlissel registered a Scottish tartan with the National Records of Scotland in the name of Stand Up! Records. Designed by Edinburgh kiltmaker Gordon Nicolson, the tartan blends the colors red, black, and tan (from Shepard Fairey's Stand Up! Records logo), blue (from the Israeli flag, symbolizing Schlissel's Jewish heritage), and silver-grey (for -ismist Recordings' 25th anniversary).

== Personal life ==
Schlissel is married and has a daughter. He lives in Minneapolis.
