= Brendon Walsh =

American comedian

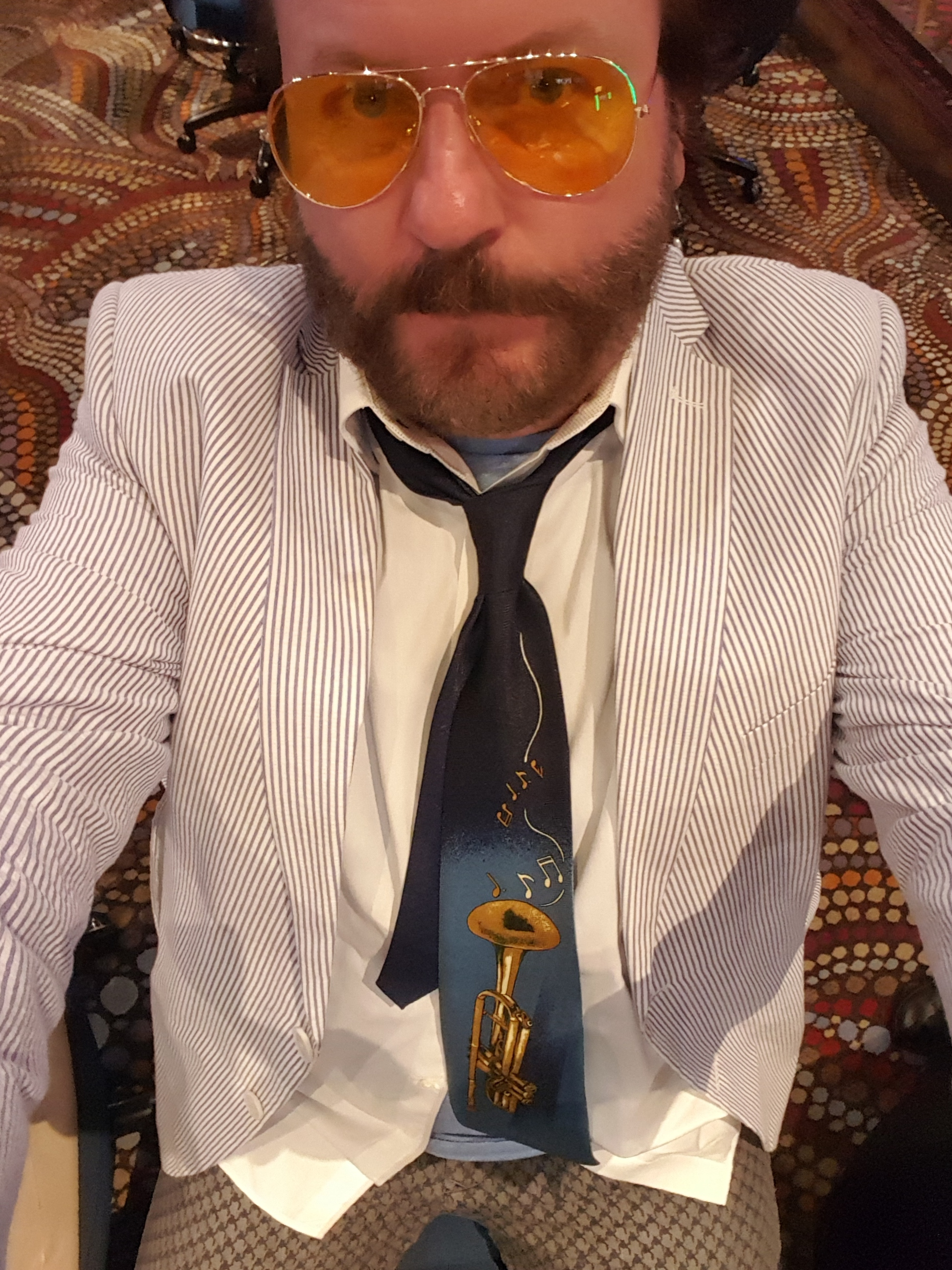
- Brendon Walsh in Las Vegas, March 2018
- Born: July 27, 1974 (age 52); Philadelphia, Pennsylvania
- Other name: Ol' BW

Comedy career
- Medium: Stand-up
- Website: www.brendonwalsh.com

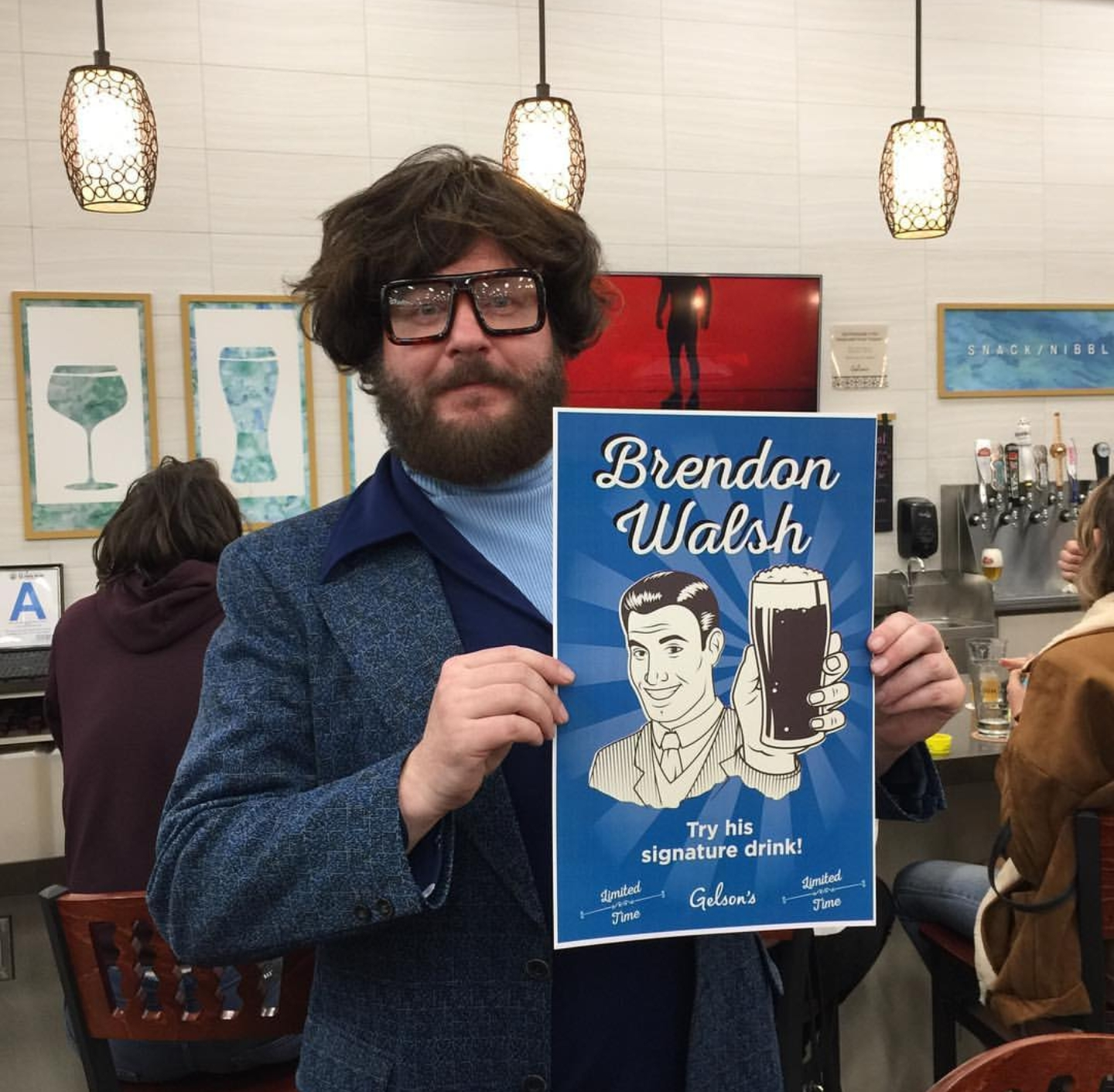
Brendon Walsh at a grocery store event in 2017

Brendon Michael Walsh (born July 27, 1974) is an American stand-up comedian and podcaster originally from Philadelphia.

== Career ==
Walsh started performing stand-up comedy in Austin, Texas in 2002. He has appeared on The Price Is Right, Premium Blend, Jimmy Kimmel Live!, Conan, Last Comic Standing, in sketches on the G4 network, @midnight, and The Bob & Tom Show. He toured from 2005 to 2008 as the opening act for Doug Stanhope.

Walsh has performed at the Vancouver Comedy Festival; Just for Laughs in Montreal; South by Southwest (SXSW); the first annual Bentzen Ball in Washington, D.C.; the Fun Fun Fun Fest in Austin, Texas; the Bridgetown Comedy Festival in Portland, Oregon; and the Aspen Comedy Festival. In 2007, he won the $10,000 grand prize on the comedy stage at Famecast.com. In 2008, he was named one of the "Top 9: Emerging Comedians" on AskMen.com.

On March 12, 2010, Walsh performed at A Night of 140 Tweets, a benefit for Haiti at the Upright Citizens Brigade Theatre in Los Angeles. In 2011, he appeared on WTF with Marc Maron and The Joe Rogan Experience. He previously co-hosted a podcast, The Bone Zone, with Randy Liedtke, and Do You Know Who Jason Segel Is? podcast with Nick Thune on the All Things Comedy network. He currently hosts The World Record Podcast, wherein each week he and a guest analyse a different world record. Guests have included Melissa Villaseñor, Josh Gad, Lin-Manuel Miranda, Christopher Nolan, Jared Fogle, Michael Keaton, Tom Brady, Corey Feldman, Dwayne "The Rock" Johnson, and Taylor Swift. Ted Danson also appeared on the show to discuss his pursuit to break a bowling world record.

In 2024, Walsh joined fellow comedians Doug Stanhope and Sean Green to launch the Get to the Points Podcast on Green's Sports Gambling Podcast Network.
