= One Dimple =

Studio album by Kyle Cease
- Released: July 11, 2006
- Recorded: 2005
- Genre: Comedy
- Length: 48:07
- Label: Comedy Central Records
- Producer: Kyle Cease Jack Vaughn Jr.

One Dimple is a CD/DVD released by comedian Kyle Cease in 2006. The CD contained a recorded performance of one of Kyle's acts in the Seattle, Washington comedy club, The Comedy Underground. The CD contains 13 tracks, all but one being part of the stand-up routine. The last was a comedy sketch. The DVD contains a 52-minute-long documentary of Kyle's road tour of 68 colleges. It also includes a performance by Kyle on the Comedy Central television show Premium Blend. The documentary follows Kyle through his "68 College Tour" slightly as an 80's Nintendo game, a gag on Kyle's joke about Nintendo.

== Track listing ==
1. 14 Hour Show
2. And That's Gonna Be Track 1
3. Me Telling You That Tracks 2 And 1 Are The 14 Hour Show
4. Four Hacky Travel Jokes
5. Generation Nintendo
6. Pills Drunk Daddy
7. My Weird Jokes
8. Elementary President
9. The Virgin Mary, The Alien, And My Grandma
10. Cheating, Dreaming Old People Who Won't Shut Up
11. Asian Bell
12. SCHMcDonalds
13. Bonus Sketch

== The DVD ==
The DVD of the Road Documentary is 52 minutes long, and displays the journey Kyle takes through visiting 68 colleges. The DVD allows the viewer to listen to commentary by Kyle and his brother Kevin, who made all the music for the movie. As a joke, it also contains commentary by a trombone, an electric toothbrush, and a vacuum cleaner.
