= Dane Cook: Vicious Circle =

Live album by Dane Cook
- Released: 2006
- Recorded: 2006
- Genre: Comedy
- Length: 2:12:00 (Original Uncut DANEgerous Edition); 1:34:12 (HBO Special); 1:13:00 (Comedy Central Secret Stash); 58:00 (Comedy Central Premier); 41:00 (Comedy Central Edited)
- Label: Comedy Central Records
- Producer: Dane Cook Jack Vaughn Jr.

Dane Cook chronology
Retaliation (2005)	Dane Cook: Vicious Circle (2006)	Rough Around the Edges: Live from Madison Square Garden (2007)

Professional ratings
Review scores
Source	Rating
Allmusic	4/5 stars

Dane Cook: Vicious Circle is a live stand-up comedy special performed for HBO written and produced by Dane Cook. It was aired on September 4, 2006. It was then released on DVD November 28, 2006, with the tagline, "What goes around has come around." The DVD includes the original unaired version and a "DANEgerous" edition.

== CD and DVD release ==
To coincide with the network television premiere of Dane Cook: Vicious Circle (Sunday, January 27, 2008), Comedy Central Records released the uncut audio of Vicious Circle the following Tuesday (January 29) through digital music vendors, such as iTunes.

Vicious Circle was also released in a box set in a CD format along with the DVD, the Dane Cook's Tourgasm DVD and a SUFI hat around the same time as Rough Around the Edges in November 2007.

== Track listing ==
=== DANEgerous ===
1. Intro – 2:25
2. The Truth About Lying – 8:32
3. My One Regret – 5:36
4. Painful Shits – 0:43
5. I Did My Best – 9:13
6. The Atheist – 9:18
7. My Son Optimus Prime – 1:26
8. The Robe – 3:52
9. B&E – 9:46
10. Kidnapped – 3:46
11. Hopes N Dreams – 3:37
12. Jake-Uh – 1:58
13. The Game of Love and How to Destroy It – 22:05
14. Post-Battle Sex – 0:39
15. Cheater 2.0 – 11:50
16. Cinematic Adventures – 12:11
17. Birthday Girl – 1:34
18. One Night Stand – 3:32
19. DJ Diddles – 10:06
20. Goodnights – 1:17
21. Encore – 2:41
22. I'll Never Be You – 4:58

=== Edited ===
1. Intro – 2:37
2. The Truth About Lying – 8:32
3. I Did My Best – 9:20
4. The Atheist – 9:19
5. My Son Optimus Prime – 0:38
6. Robe – 3:52
7. B&E – 8:41
8. Jake-Uh – 1:58
9. Bad Relationships – 9:53
10. Post-Battle Sex – 0:39
11. Cheater 2.0 – 11:50
12. Cinematic Adventures – 12:11
13. One Night Stand / DJ Diddles – 12:52
14. Goodnights – 2:55
