= The Bob's Burgers Music Album =

Soundtrack album by various artists
- Released: May 12, 2017
- Genre: Comedy
- Length: 1:56:07
- Label: Sub Pop

The Bob's Burgers Music Album is the soundtrack to American animated sitcom Bob's Burgers. It was released on May 12, 2017 via Sub Pop.

The album is composed of 112 songs, 107 of which are from the first six seasons of the show, performed by the main cast members (H. Jon Benjamin, John Roberts, Dan Mintz, Eugene Mirman and Kristen Schaal) and recurring/special guests like Aziz Ansari, Bill Hader, Carly Simon, Cyndi Lauper, Fred Armisen, Kevin Kline, Paul Rudd, Sarah Silverman and Zach Galifianakis. Five never-aired Bob's Buskers cover versions of songs from the show performed by The National, Låpsley, Stephin Merritt and St. Vincent.

== Critical reception ==
Professional ratings
Aggregate scores
Source	Rating
Metacritic	77/100
Review scores
Source	Rating
AllMusic	4/5 stars
Clash	8/10
Noisey	A−
Pitchfork	6.9/10
Record Collector	2/5 stars
The Skinny	5/5 stars

The Bob's Burgers Music Album was met with generally positive reviews. At Metacritic, the album received an average score of 77, based on 7 reviews.

Rachel Bowles of The Skinny praised the album saying, "The LP manages to consistently surprise and entertain for its entire running time, just two minutes shy of two hours. Bob's Burgers' unique music provides an offbeat, aural soundscape to its narrative and allows for characters to express themselves". Heather Phares of AllMusic said, "The sheer size of The Bob's Burgers Music Album means that Gene Belcher might be the only one with the stamina to listen to the entire set more than once, but it's great for obsessive fans who can finally own the whole shebang". In his review for Clash, Sam Walker-Smart stated, "Much like the show itself this is a wonderfully crafted set (check out the deluxe 'condiment' vinyl), which is at times both smart, sweet and very, very, stupid". Pretty Much Amazing reviewer Daniel Bromfield said, "Bouchard really puts work into these tunes. He strives to make each one better than it really needs to be". The 405 reviewer stated, "Of course, at nearly two hours long, it's probably not something you'll listen to all in one go (especially if you're not a Bob's Burgers fan), but it's quite easy to dip in and out of it at your leisure. If you like songs about butts and farts too, then you're well catered for here". Eric Thurm of Pitchfork said, "It's pitched almost entirely at "Bob's" die-hards and listening to this album without being a fan of "Bob's Burgers" is a fool’s errand. Even for fanatics, the two hours still feels like an ill-advised trek. The ease with which the soundtrack switches between novelty ditties and riot grrrl homage—a genre the show is most cozy with—is part of its draw".

In a mixed review, Record Collector's Mischa Pearlman stated: "Sadly, outside the context of the episodes, the actual ditties are only mildly humorous at best, and barely warrant more than one play through".

== Commercial performance ==
Reaching a peak position of number twenty-one on the US Billboard 200, The Bob's Burgers Music Album remained on the chart for a total of two weeks. It also topped the Billboard Comedy Albums chart, reached number two spot on the Vinyl Albums and the Independent Albums, peaked at number three on the Top Soundtracks, and landed at number eight on Tastemakers chart.

== Track listing ==
No.	Title	Performer(s)	Length
1.	"The Bob's Burgers Theme Song"		1:02
2.	"Lifting Up the Skirt of the Night"	John Roberts & H. Jon Benjamin	1:10
3.	"Butts, Butts, Butts"	John Roberts, Loren Bouchard, Jim Dauterive, Tobias Trost, Chuck Smith, Matt Beville & John Dylan Keith	0:27
4.	"Theme From Banjo"	H. Jon Benjamin & Loren Bouchard	0:37
5.	"Da Ding Ding"	Eugene Mirman, H. Jon Benjamin & John Roberts	1:06
6.	"Pirates of Panache"	H. Jon Benjamin, John Roberts, Larry Murphy & John Dylan Keith	0:16
7.	"Weekend at Mort's"	Kristen Schaal, John Roberts, Larry Murphy, H. Jon Benjamin, Eugene Mirman & Dan Mintz	0:40
8.	"Sex Music"	Loren Bouchard	0:19
9.	"Wing Man"	Ron Lynch & Sam Seder	0:36
10.	"Taffy Butt"	Cyndi Lauper	1:18
11.	"Getting Out of P.E."	Loren Bouchard, Nora Smith, Holly Schlesinger & Chris Maxwell	0:26
12.	"Groping for Glory"	John Roberts	1:18
13.	"Oil Spill"	Megan Mullally	0:35
14.	"One Way or Another"	Megan Mullally	0:56
15.	"The Prince of Persuasia"	Rob Huebel & Dan Mintz	1:26
16.	"Bad Girls"	Holly Schlesinger, Nora Smith & Loren Bouchard	0:32
17.	"You Got Beefsquatched"	Loren Bouchard	0:39
18.	"Milkin' the Cow"	Eugene Mirman & John Roberts	0:37
19.	"Fun! Fun! Fun! Fun!"	Eugene Mirman, Holly Schlesinger, Nora Smith, Loren Bouchard, Wendy Molyneux & Lizzie Molyneux	0:28
20.	"Parakeet in Your Hat"	Bill Hader, John Roberts & H. Jon Benjamin	1:26
21.	"Kill the Turkey"	John Roberts & H. Jon Benjamin	0:55
22.	"The Diarrhea Song"	John Roberts & Eugene Mirman	0:37
23.	"Silent Love"	Eugene Mirman, H. Jon Benjamin, Kristen Schaal, Dan Mintz, David Wain & John Michael Higgins	1:15
24.	"Silent Muffler"	Holly Schlesinger & Nora Smith	0:18
25.	"The Harry Truman Song"	John Roberts	0:35
26.	"Daddy/The Itsy Bitsy Stripper"	Fred Armisen, Larry Murphy, H. Jon Benjamin, Eugene Mirman & John Roberts	1:14
27.	"Sex Sex Sex Sex Sex"	Fred Armisen	0:40
28.	"You're the Best"	Sam Seder	1:29
29.	"Mad Pooper"	Will Forte & Loren Bouchard	0:36
30.	"Buckle It Up"	H. Jon Benjamin, Kristen Schaal, Eugene Mirman & Dan Mintz	0:06
31.	"Love Mission"	Loren Bouchard	0:16
32.	"Two People"	John Roberts & Larry Murphy	0:35
33.	"Can't Get Enough (of Your Woman Stuff)"	Loren Bouchard & Nora Smith	0:53
34.	"Funky Finger"	Loren Bouchard & John Dylan Keith	0:28
35.	"This Is Working"	H. Jon Benjamin & John Roberts	1:02
36.	"Baby Hold On"	John Roberts & Loren Bouchard	1:00
37.	"Electric Love"	Megan Mullally, Kevin Kline, Eugene Mirman, Kristen Schaal, H. Jon Benjamin, Larry Murphy, Dan Mintz, John Roberts, Mark Proksch, Loren Bouchard & Nora Smith	3:45
38.	"T-I-N-A"	H. Jon Benjamin & Dan Mintz	0:35
39.	"The Snake Song"	Eugene Mirman, John Dylan Keith, Loren Bouchard & Nora Smith	0:47
40.	"Fracas Foam"	Loren Bouchard & Jim Dauterive	0:35
41.	"The Kids Run the Restaurant"	John Roberts	0:38
42.	"Coal Mine"	Scott Jacobson, Steven Davis & Kelvin Chow-Min Yu	0:54
43.	"Whisper in Your Eyes"	Max Greenfield	1:16
44.	"I Wanna Hear Your Secrets"	Max Greenfield	0:52
45.	"I've Got a Yum Yum"	John Roberts, Kristen Schaal, H. Jon Benjamin, Loren Bouchard & Nora Smith	1:07
46.	"Rain, Rain, Flash, Flash"	Dan Mintz, Dave Herman & Lindsey Stoddart	0:37
47.	"We're Coming for Ya"	H. Jon Benjamin, Eugene Mirman, Kristen Schaal, John Roberts, Dan Mintz, Loren Bouchard & John Dylan Keith	0:51
48.	"Quicky Kiss It"	Loren Bouchard	0:42
49.	"Prankin'"	Loren Bouchard	0:34
50.	"Sneaky Pete"	Ken Jeong, John Roberts, Kristen Schaal, Eugene Mirman, H. Jon Benjamin, Nora Smith & Loren Bouchard	1:36
51.	"Gravy Boat"	Megan Mullally & John Roberts	0:41
52.	"We Won the Talent Show"	Sarah Silverman & Laura Silverman	2:34
53.	"Derek Dematopolis"	Megan Mullally & John Roberts	1:23
54.	"Not Bad for Havin' Three Kids"	Megan Mullally, John Roberts & Lindsey Stoddart	1:21
55.	"Jingle in the Jungle"	Steven Davis & Kelvin Chow-Min Yu	0:51
56.	"Slumber Party Fashion Show"	Loren Bouchard & Nora Smith	0:54
57.	"It's Not Magic It's Tragic"	Loren Bouchard	0:35
58.	"The Fart Song"	Eugene Mirman, Aziz Ansari, Kristen Schaal, H. Jon Benjamin, Dan Mintz, John Roberts, Loren Bouchard, Nora Smith, Rachel Hastings & Dave Herman	1:28
59.	"Hava Nagila"	Dan Mintz	0:43
60.	"Equestranauts Theme"	Dan Mintz, H. Jon Benjamin, Eugene Mirman, Kristen Schaal, Larry Murphy & John Roberts	1:13
61.	"Nice Things Are Nice"	H. Jon Benjamin, Kevin Kline, Jordan Peele, Eugene Mirman, Kristen Schaal, John Roberts & Dan Mintz	1:42
62.	"Wharf of Wonder"	John Roberts	0:39
63.	"Bad Things Are Bad"	H. Jon Benjamin, Kevin Kline, John Roberts, Zach Galifianakis, Jordan Peele, Paul F. Tompkins, Jenny Slate, Eugene Mirman, Larry Murphy, Laura Silverman, Bobby Tisdale & Brian Huskey	2:09
64.	"Die Hard/Working Girl Musical Medley"	David Wain, Eugene Mirman, Dan Mintz, H. Jon Benjamin, John Roberts, Kristen Schaal & Melissa Galsky	2:00
65.	"Work Hard or Die Trying, Girl"	Laura Silverman, Sarah Silverman, Aziz Ansari, H. Jon Benjamin, Carly Simon, Danny!, Kristen Schaal, Brian Huskey, John Roberts, David Wain, Eugene Mirman, Bobby Tisdale & Dan Mintz	3:35
66.	"Jeff (Il Est Mort)"	Loren Bouchard	0:38
67.	"Your Best Friend"	John Roberts & Larry Murphy	0:40
68.	"Love Is in Control (Finger on the Trigger)"	H. Jon Benjamin & John Dylan Keith	1:09
69.	"Christmas Magic"	John Roberts & Larry Murphy	0:52
70.	"Happy Crappy Place"	H. Jon Benjamin, John Roberts & Kristen Schaal	1:13
71.	"Darryl's Slow Jam"	Aziz Ansari & Chris Maxwell	0:55
72.	"I'm Jimmy Jr. Pesto"	H. Jon Benjamin, Kristen Schaal, Sarah Silverman, Eugene Mirman, Dan Mintz & Brian Huskey	0:35
73.	"The Sheriff Had a Piggy"	John Roberts, Eugene Mirman & Kristen Schaal	0:21
74.	"Lipstick on His Pickup"	Megan Mullally, Eugene Mirman & Larry Murphy	0:28
75.	"I'll Trade You These Tears/I Won't Go Solo on You"	John Roberts, Megan Mullally, Eugene Mirman, Dan Mintz & Rich Fulcher	1:16
76.	"Shimmy Tap"	John Roberts	0:46
77.	"Date Night"	John Roberts, H. Jon Benjamin & Kristen Schaal	0:53
78.	"Don't You Love Cotton Candy"	John Roberts, Dave Herman, Kristen Schaal & Eugene Mirman	1:01
79.	"Jam With Darryl"	Aziz Ansari & Eugene Mirman	0:18
80.	"His Name Is Lenny"	Aziz Ansari, Brian Huskey, Eugene Mirman & H. Jon Benjamin	0:56
81.	"I Don't Need Music"	Eugene Mirman, Kristen Schaal, Dan Mintz & John Dylan Keith	0:49
82.	"I Want Some Burgers and Fries"	Eugene Mirman, Kristen Schaal, Aziz Ansari & Dan Mintz	0:42
83.	"BM in the PM"	John Roberts & Chris Maxwell	0:51
84.	"I'm Falling for Helen"	Larry Murphy & Tim Dacey	0:40
85.	"99 Red Balloons"	H. Jon Benjamin & Kevin Kline	1:26
86.	"It's Called Fate (And It's Great)"	Dan Mintz, Kristen Schaal, Eugene Mirman, Ron Lynch, Sam Seder, John Dylan Keith & Loren Bouchard	0:45
87.	"I Love You So Much (It's Scary)"	Max Greenfield, H. Jon Benjamin, John Roberts, Dan Mintz, Eugene Mirman, Kristen Schaal, Steven Davis & Kelvin Chow-Min Yu	2:45
88.	"It's Thanksgiving for Everybody"	H. Jon Benjamin, Megan Mullally, John Roberts, Kristen Schaal, Dan Mintz & Eugene Mirman	1:13
89.	"The Spirits of Christmas"	Kevin Kline	3:05
90.	"The Nice-Capades"	Eugene Mirman, Dan Mintz, Kristen Schaal, John Roberts, H. Jon Benjamin & Larry Murphy	2:28
91.	"Amor Por Favor (Me Llamo Tina)"	Dan Mintz & Kristen Schaal	0:37
92.	"It's Valentine's Day"	Eugene Mirman, David Wain, Melissa Galsky & Bobby Tisdale	1:01
93.	"Hot Ham and Cheese Day"	David Wain, Loren Bouchard & Tim Dacey	0:38
94.	"Cease and Desist"	John Roberts, H. Jon Benjamin, Jon Glaser & John Dylan Keith	0:47
95.	"Muse Dance"	John Roberts, Loren Bouchard & Tim Dacey	0:37
96.	"If You Love Something"	Jordan Peele, John Roberts, Chris Maxwell & Scott Jacobson	0:38
97.	"Fart Stools (for the Gifted)"		0:37
98.	"Do the Dirty Pigeon"	Loren Bouchard, Chris Maxwell & H. Jon Benjamin	0:40
99.	"Two Butted Goat"	Bobby Tisdale & Eugene Mirman	0:46
100.	"Butt Phone"	Robert Ben Garant & John Dylan Keith	0:44
101.	"Breaking Out"	Dan Mintz, H. Jon Benjamin, Aziz Ansari, Rachel Hastings & Dave Herman	0:39
102.	"Mononucleosis"	Dan Mintz, H. Jon Benjamin & Aziz Ansari	0:35
103.	"Just What I Needed"	Dan Mintz, H. Jon Benjamin, Loren Bouchard, John Dylan Keith, John Roberts, Dave Herman & Bobby Tisdale	1:44
104.	"I Love Charades"	Chris Parnell & Chris Maxwell	0:52
105.	"I'm Tall Enough"	Max Greenfield	0:44
106.	"Yat Dat Dat Da"	Paul Rudd & Dan Mintz	0:37
107.	"Bad Stuff Happens in the Bathroom"	H. Jon Benjamin, Kristen Schaal, Dan Mintz, Eugene Mirman, John Roberts, Tim Dacey, Loren Bouchard, Nora Smith, Steven Davis, Kelvin Chow-Min Yu, Jim Dauterive, Jonathan Peter Schroeder, Wendy Molyneux, Lizzie Molyneux, Rachel Hastings, Larry Murphy & Jay Johnston	2:30
108.	"Electric Love"	Stephin Merritt & Kenny Mellman	1:54
109.	"Bad Girls"	St. Vincent	1:41
110.	"Sailors in Your Mouth"	The National	2:29
111.	"Christmas Magic"	The National	1:19
112.	"Bad Stuff Happens in the Bathroom"	The National & Låpsley	2:43
Total length:			1:56:07

== Personnel ==
- Jeff Kleinsmith – creative director
- Bernard Derriman – artwork, design
- Derek Schroeder – artwork, layout
- Tony Gennaro – artwork, layout
- Anthony Aguinaldo – artwork
- Maggie Harbaugh – artwork
- Tyler Garrison – artwork
- Kevin Bernier – artwork
- Devin Roth – artwork
- Jay Howell – artwork
- Joe Healy – artwork
- Phil Hayes – design

== Charts ==
=== Weekly charts ===
Chart (2017)	Peak position
US Billboard 200	21
US Top Comedy Albums (Billboard)	1
US Independent Albums (Billboard)	2
US Top Soundtracks (Billboard)	3

=== Year-end charts ===
Chart (2017)	Peak position
US Top Comedy albums (Billboard)	1
US Soundtracks (Billboard)	24
Chart (2018)	Peak position
US Top Comedy albums (Billboard)	2
