= Rules of Enragement =

Studio album by Lewis Black
- Released: September 23, 2003
- Recorded: June 26–29, 2003 in Minneapolis, Minnesota
- Genre: Comedy
- Length: 65:50
- Label: Comedy Central Records
- Producer: John Machnik, Dan Schlissel, Lewis Black, Jack Vaughn Jr. (executive producer)

Lewis Black chronology
The End of the Universe (2002)	Rules of Enragement (2003)	Luther Burbank Performing Arts Center Blues (2005)

Rules of Enragement is Lewis Black's third album as well as his first for Comedy Central Records. It was recorded at Acme Comedy Company in Minneapolis, Minnesota.

The title is a play on the military term, "Rules of engagement".

An LP edition of 500 was issued on clear blue vinyl by Stand Up! Records.

Professional ratings
Review scores
Source	Rating
Allmusic	link

== Track listing ==
1. "Minnesota Winters" – 3:00
2. "The Settling of Minnesota" – 3:32
3. "The Coldest Winter EVER!" – 3:05
4. "International Travel" – 3:27
5. "Ireland and Health" – 14:56
6. "Health Clubs" – 3:00
7. "Small Pox" – 1:59
8. "Greed" – 9:30
9. "Who's Fucking Who" – 4:48
10. "Homeland Security" – 3:47
11. "Bringing Democracy to Iraq" – 1:09
12. "The War in Iraq" – 10:45
13. "A Sense of Humor" – 2:48

== Notes ==
In this album Black swears close to 200 times, an average of every 20 seconds, and says fuck close to 100 times, an average of every 40 seconds.
