= Rough Around the Edges: Live from Madison Square Garden =

Live album by Dane Cook
- Released: November 13, 2007
- Recorded: November 12, 2006, at Madison Square Garden in New York City
- Genre: Comedy
- Length: 65:54
- Label: Comedy Central Records
- Producer: Dane Cook Jack Vaughn Jr.

Dane Cook chronology
Vicious Circle (2006)	Rough Around the Edges: Live from Madison Square Garden (2007)	Isolated Incident (2009)

Professional ratings
Review scores
Source	Rating
Allmusic	4/5 stars
Pop Matters	1/10 stars

Rough Around the Edges: Live from Madison Square Garden is an album by American stand-up comedian and actor Dane Cook. It was released on November 13, 2007, on both CD and DVD.

Released on Thanksgiving weekend, Rough Around the Edges: Live from Madison Square Garden debuted at #11 and sold 90,000 copies in its first week; Retaliation had sold 86,000 in its first week but debuted at #4.

On the "Your Mom's House Podcast", Dane Cook admitted to improvising about 50% of this.

== Track listing ==
1. Intro – 1:56
2. Benson's Animal Farm – 5:13
3. Regrets – 4:59
4. TiTo – 1:50
5. War Flute – 4:28
6. Copy Machine – 2:42
7. 15¢ – 4:11
8. Pedophiles – 5:42
9. Mannequin Sex – 2:13
10. Herpolie Urpolies – 4:25
11. A Condom? – 7:09
12. Come to Fruition – 6:14
13. Video Game Strip Club – 6:06
14. Motorcycle Helmet – 4:15
15. What Do You Want Me to Do to You? – 4:40

== Charts ==
=== Weekly charts ===
Chart (2007)	Peak position
Canadian Albums (Billboard)	20
US Billboard 200	11
US Top Comedy Albums (Billboard)	1
US Independent Albums (Billboard)	3

=== Year-end charts ===
Chart (2008)	Position
US Billboard 200	90
US Top Comedy Albums (Billboard)	1
Chart (2009)	Position
US Top Comedy Albums (Billboard)	12

== Certifications ==
Region	Certification	Certified units/sales
United States (RIAA)	Gold	500,000^{^}
^{^} Shipments figures based on certification alone.
