= Comedy Albums =

US record chart published by Billboard

Comedy Albums is a Billboard chart that lists the "top-selling spoken word and musical comedy albums" each week, as ranked by sales data compiled by Nielsen SoundScan. The chart debuted as Top Comedy Albums in October 2004 when it was published for the first time exclusively in Billboard's websites. The first number-one album on the Top Comedy Albums chart was Lord, I Apologize by Larry the Cable Guy. As of November 2023, the longest leading number-one album on the chart is Inside (The Songs) by Bo Burnham.

Its Billboard Year-End chart has been archived for public viewing back to 2006, with 15 entries for each year.

On May 16, 2014, Billboard published "Top 20 Best Selling Comedy Albums", featuring albums from as far back as 1991, the start of the Nielsen SoundScan era.

== Year-end #1 Comedy Albums ==
Year	Album	Artist	Ref.
2006	Retaliation	Dane Cook	
2007	Straight Outta Lynwood	"Weird Al" Yankovic	
2008	Rough Around the Edges: Live from Madison Square Garden	Dane Cook	
2009	Incredibad	The Lonely Island	
2010	Incredibad	The Lonely Island	
2011	Turtleneck & Chain	The Lonely Island	
2012	Rize of the Fenix	Tenacious D	
2013	The Wack Album	The Lonely Island	
2014	Mandatory Fun	"Weird Al" Yankovic	
2015	Professional Rapper	Lil Dicky	
2016	Professional Rapper	Lil Dicky	
2017	The Bob's Burgers Music Album	Soundtrack	
2018	Cool Patrol	Ninja Sex Party	
2019	Rick and Morty	Soundtrack	
2020	Professional Rapper	Lil Dicky	
2021	Inside (The Songs)	Bo Burnham	
2022	Inside (The Songs)	Bo Burnham	
2023	Inside (The Songs)	Bo Burnham	
2024	Hazbin Hotel	The Cast of Hazbin Hotel	
2025	Hazbin Hotel	The Cast of Hazbin Hotel	
