= Thick Noon =

Live album by Nick Thune
- Released: February 23, 2010
- Recorded: May 2009, Comedy Works, Denver
- Genre: Comedy
- Length: 47:52
- Label: Comedy Central
- Producer: Jack Vaughn Jr.

Nick Thune chronology
Thick Noon (2010)	Folk Hero (2014)

Thick Noon is the debut album from comedian Nick Thune released by Comedy Central Records on February 23, 2010. The CD contains live tracks as well studio songs. Packaged with a DVD containing various video footage. The title is a spoonerism of his name.

== Track listing ==
=== CD ===
No.	Title	Length
1.	"You're Welcome"	2:50
2.	"Life Saver"	1:28
3.	"I Don't Care"	4:02
4.	"Kick Ass Summer"	1:29
5.	"Red Bull Decaf"	2:35
6.	"Weed Timeline"	5:20
7.	"Instant Messenger"	5:49
8.	"Backflip"	5:20
9.	"Missed Connections"	7:59
10.	"Here Girl (For a Lost, Pregnant Dog) [Studio]"	2:07
11.	"Butterflies [Studio]"	0:27
12.	"Iron Man [Studio]"	3:32
13.	"Lobster [Studio]"	1:33
14.	"Dreams [Studio]"	3:24

=== DVD ===
1. "Comedy Central Presents (Aired Version)"
2. "Comedy Central Presents (Uncut Version)"
3. "Nick's Big Show Episodes 1 -3"
4. "iThunes Short Films"
