= Shiny Happy Jihad =

Studio album by Joe Rogan
- Released: April 10, 2007
- Recorded: September 2006
- Genre: Comedy
- Label: Comedy Central
- Producer: Chandra Keyes, Joe Rogan, Jeff Sussman, Jack Vaughn Jr.

Joe Rogan chronology
I'm Gonna Be Dead Someday (2000)	Shiny Happy Jihad (2007)	Joe Rogan: Talking Monkeys in Space (2010)

Professional ratings
Review scores
Source	Rating
AllMusic	4/5 stars

Shiny Happy Jihad is an album by American comedian Joe Rogan, released in 2007 by Comedy Central Records. On the album, he "gives his views on suicide bombers, proposes solutions for peace in the Middle East, and debunks the story of Noah's Ark, among other topics". In 2008, the Boston Globe listed it among its ten best comedy albums of the previous year.

== Track listing ==
1. "Fear Factor"
2. "Pot, Jet Packs, and Peace in the Middle East (And Drunk People Yelling Shit on My CD)"
3. "72 Virgins"
4. "Suicide Bombings, Sad Penis, and Big Party Girl"
5. "Jerk Off First, Safe Zone"
6. "Bisexual Dudes Givin' Advice"
7. "Gay Is Funny, Brokeback Mountain"
8. "Osama Is Right Out of a Comic Book and the Terrorist Cell Phone Network"
9. "Boycotting and People Who Like Animals More Than People, March of the Penguins"
10. "Weird Spots In the Middle"
11. "Big Dick Pills"
12. "Pussy Whipped, Best Friends"
13. "Dumb People Out-Breeding Smart People Explains the Pyramids"
14. "I Was Raised Catholic, In Search of Noah's Ark"
15. "We're on a Rock Flying Through Space"
16. "Wesley Snipes, The UFC, and Jim Brown"
17. "Fear Factor Is Cancelled, Telemundo, and Mike Goldberg"
18. "Eddie Bravo, Show Me Your Pussy, and Text Messaging"
19. "Lady and Her Son, Ex-Boyfriends Are Hungry Wolves"
