= Bad Johnson =

2014 film by Huck Botko

- Theatrical release poster
- Directed by: Huck Botko
- Written by: Jeff Tetreault
- Produced by: Reid Brody; Danny Roman
- Starring: Cam Gigandet; Nick Thune; Jamie Chung; Katherine Cunningham; Kevin Miller
- Cinematography: Luke Geissbuhler
- Edited by: Peter Tarter
- Music by: Didier Leplae; Joe Wong
- Production companies: 2DS Productions; Roman Empire
- Distributed by: Gravitas Ventures
- Release date: May 2, 2014
- Running time: 88 minutes
- Country: United States
- Language: English

Bad Johnson, known as Schlong Story in some markets, is a 2014 American sex comedy film directed by Huck Botko.

== Plot ==
Rich is a sex addict who ruins every relationship through infidelity. He wishes that his penis would leave him alone. He wakes up one day to find that his penis has taken on human form.

== Cast ==
- Cam Gigandet as Rich Johnson
- Nick Thune as Rich's Penis
- Katherine Cunningham as Lindsay Young
- Kevin Miller as Josh Nelson
- Jamie Chung as Jamie

== Reception ==
On the review aggregator website Rotten Tomatoes, 28% of 18 critics' reviews are positive.
