= Harmful If Swallowed =

Live album by Dane Cook
- Released: July 22, 2003
- Recorded: The Laff Stop, Houston, Texas, 2002
- Genre: Comedy
- Length: 58:27
- Label: Comedy Central Records
- Producer: Brian Volk-Weiss; Dane Cook; Jack Vaughn; Barry Katz

Dane Cook chronology
Harmful If Swallowed (2003)	Retaliation (2005)

Professional ratings
Review scores
Source	Rating
AllMusic	3/5 stars

Harmful If Swallowed is the first CD/DVD set from American comedian Dane Cook. It was released on July 22, 2003.

The attached DVD contains Dane's appearances on Comedy Central Presents (both the edited-for-television and unedited hour-long versions), Comics Come Home 5, and Premium Blend. As of 2014, sales in the United States have exceeded 1,404,000 copies, according to Nielsen SoundScan.

== Original version ==
Before this version produced by Comedy Central Records came out, there was a different version of this album that was independently produced by Cook himself that contained a track lampooning Steve Irwin, the Crocodile Hunter. This track was removed for the "official" CD / DVD release. To fill the gap of the missing track, the bonus track was added in this cut of the album.

The original release contained almost entirely different artwork and liner notes.

== Track listing ==
1. Intro – 0:46
2. Parking Structure – 1:28
3. Umm, Helllllo? – 3:50
4. Car Accident – 2:43
5. Tire in the Face – 2:07
6. Would You Rather... – 6:03
7. Fireman & Policeman & Miniature Golf Course Security Guard – 2:07
8. The BK Lounge – 3:29
9. Pregnant Lady – 1:48
10. Five Sisters – 0:58
11. Slip 'n' Bleed – 0:59 – referencing Slip 'N Slide
12. Speak 'n' Spell – 1:03
13. Operation – Monopoly – 2:16
14. Don't Tickle Me – 0:48
15. Bathroom – 2:24
16. Pranks – 1:48
17. Fuk and the Finga – 1:44
18. Just Wanna Dance – 4:18
19. Head – 2:34
20. Nightmare – 3:05
21. Hopped Up on the Q – 1:12
22. Not So Kool-Aid – 1:28
23. Pick a Number Please! – 1:44
24. Bonus Track – 7:36

== Certifications ==
Region	Certification	Certified units/sales
United States (RIAA)	Platinum	1,000,000^{^}
^{^} Shipments figures based on certification alone.
