= Doing My Time =

Live album by Jim Gaffigan
- Released: December 7, 2004
- Recorded: August 2004, Giggle's Comedy Club, Seattle
- Genre: Comedy
- Length: 63:51
- Label: Comedy Central Records
- Producer: Jack Vaughn Jr.

Jim Gaffigan chronology
The Last Supper (2004)	Doing My Time (2004)	Beyond the Pale (2006)

Professional ratings
Review scores
Source	Rating
AllMusic	3.5/5 stars

Doing My Time is the fifth album released by American stand-up comedian Jim Gaffigan. The album was released on December 7, 2004, by Comedy Central Records.

== Track listing ==
1. Elton John - 11:20
2. Recessive Genes - 1:09
3. Got Married - 4:40
4. Having My Baby - 4:08
5. Beautiful - 5:29
6. Midwest Thang - 4:01
7. Hoooot Pocket! - 5:13
8. Future Pope - 1:49
9. Slumberland - 7:55
10. Guy with the Red Umbrella - 2:56
11. Anti-Reading - 5:22
12. I'm a Manatee! - 4:22
13. Gravy Drinker - 5:30
