= These Are Jokes =

Studio album by Demetri Martin
- Released: September 26, 2006
- Genre: Stand-up comedy Comedy rock
- Length: 70:52
- Label: Comedy Central Records
- Producer: Jack Vaughn Jr.

Professional ratings
Review scores
Source	Rating
AllMusic	4/5 stars

These Are Jokes is the first CD/DVD set from American comedian Demetri Martin. Some of the jokes have previously appeared on his Comedy Central Presents special as well as his portion of the compilation Invite Them Up.

The attached DVD contains Martin's Comedy Central Presents special, a few of his jokes set to his animation, some short documentaries, some songs, and two very early performances.

The disc also features some of Martin's friends, including SNL cast member Will Forte (who appears in "Personal Information Waltz") and comedian Leo Allen (who appears in "These Jokes").

The album was certified gold by the RIAA in May 2009.

== Track listing ==
1. The Start – 3:01
2. Some Jokes – 7:09
3. The Remix – 5:40
4. Other Jokes – 1:27
5. Sames and Opposites – 8:04
6. These Jokes – 5:50
7. Personal Information Waltz – 7:12
8. One Story – 6:55
9. Some More Jokes – 3:30
10. The Jokes with Guitar – 13:58
11. The Grapes Song – 2:42
12. The Wisdom Song – 3:09
13. The Name Was Johnny – 2:15

== Extras and Easter eggs ==
- Includes two introductions: a CD introduction by Martin's grandmother and an onstage introduction by fellow comedian Arj Barker.
- The red letters on the packaging comprise a code. It says: "Demetri sea jokes" (on the front cover), "some see more seashores see the hue red" (on the back), "I am at a site it is demetri inthis .com" (behind the CD), and "the code is tides" (behind the DVD).
- Other messages in red on the back cover are "ego sum inconcinnus" (Latin meaning "I am awkward") and "double hawk"
