= Party (Nick Swardson album) =

Studio album by Nick Swardson
- Released: October 23, 2007
- Genre: Comedy
- Length: 50:15
- Label: Happy Madison; Comedy Central
- Producer: Jack Vaughn Jr.

Party is the first CD/DVD set from American comedian Nick Swardson. It was released on October 23, 2007 and later certified platinum status on May 26, 2009. It was also produced on the Comedy Central Records label by Adam Sandler's production company, Happy Madison.

== Track listing ==
1. "Blackout Morning" (featuring Peter Dante and Andy Samberg) – 5:36
2. "Opening" – 2:04
3. "Drinking" – 2:05
4. "Smoking Pot" – 6:20
5. "Retarded" – 1:55
6. "Gay" – 0:37
7. "Party" – 1:36
8. "Birthday Gift" – 3:06
9. "British Kid" – 1:13
10. "Cat/Ghost" – 2:13
11. "Movie Previews" – 1:50
12. "Dying" – 4:27
13. "1580s" – 0:56
14. "You Had to Be There" – 1:39
15. "Wheel of Fortune" – 3:33
16. "Old People" – 11:57
17. "Cary and Mindy" (featuring David Spade) – 2:28
