= Anticipation (Lewis Black album) =

Live album by Lewis Black
- Released: August 5, 2008
- Recorded: Wausau, Wisconsin
- Genre: Comedy
- Length: 52:29
- Label: Comedy Central Records
- Producer: Dan Schlissel; John Machnik; Jack Vaughn Jr. (executive producer)

Lewis Black chronology
| The Carnegie Hall Performance (2006) | Anticipation (2008) | Stark Raving Black (2010) |

Professional ratings
Review scores
| Source | Rating |
|---|---|
| Allmusic | 3/5 stars |

Anticipation is the sixth album by comedian Lewis Black. It was released on August 5, 2008, on Comedy Central Records. The album consists of stand-up material he has used on his tours over a three-year period, and was recorded on September 21, 2007, in Wausau, Wisconsin.

The album cover features part of the word "Anticipation" while the back features the rest of the word. It was designed for people to think Black was "anti-something".

== Track listing ==
1. This Moment – 3:55
2. My.......Virginity – 11:00
3. Golfers – 7:01
4. Gamblers – 1:51
5. Xmas – 2:30
6. Xmas Halftime – 3:05
7. Santa – 8:05
8. Chanooookah – 2:58
9. Chanukah – 4:45
10. A Great Headline – 2:38
11. Blueberry Pancakes – 4:35
