= Isolated Incident =

2009 live album by Dane Cook

ISolated INcident

Live album by Dane Cook
- Released: May 19, 2009; November 17, 2009 (DVD)
- Genre: Comedy
- Length: 64:38; 55:57 (DVD)
- Label: Comedy Central
- Producer: Jack Vaughn Jr.

Dane Cook chronology
Rough Around the Edges: Live from Madison Square Garden (2007)	ISolated INcident (2009)	I Did My Best – Greatest Hits (2010)

Professional ratings
Review scores
Source	Rating
Allmusic	2.5/5 stars

Dane Cook: ISolated INcident is a stand-up comedy special. ISolated INcident premiered on Comedy Central on May 17, 2009, with the CD/DVD release following on May 19. In the special, Cook performs for a crowd of 400 people at the Laugh Factory. The entire special was shot in one take with no edits. He then started performing the new material live for the Isolated Incident – Globo Thermo Tour 2009, which began on April 25, 2009. Dane Cook released the DVD special that was aired on Comedy Central on November 17, 2009.

== Track listing ==
1. Intro – 0:25
2. Obama – 3:45
3. Self Assassination – 1:52
4. Vernacular – 2:45
5. Pissed Off – 1:49
6. Twat Swatters – 2:21
7. Banter #1 – 0:35
8. Mom & Pops – 3:10
9. Haters – 4:30
10. Adoption – 1:24
11. Syncing Feelings – 1:01
12. W.W.Y.D.I.?? – 4:21 (What Would You Do, If??)
13. Interracial Tail – 2:01
14. Remote Location – 4:48
15. Push and Pray – 0:58
16. Big Shot – 2:40
17. Rigamarole – 2:26
18. Role Play – 4:56
19. Hidden Gems – 1:08
20. Peanut Butter Smack – 7:04
21. War Gamer – 1:47
22. Banter #2 – 0:33
23. The 'C' Word – 2:19
24. Novel Ideas – 1:23
25. Spiritual Comeback – 1:23
26. Alternate Ending to Track 13 – 0:26
27. Banter #3 – 2:53
- *Tracks 21–27 not on TV Special

== Certifications ==
Region	Certification	Certified units/sales
United States (RIAA) Video	2× Platinum	200,000^{^}
^{^} Shipments figures based on certification alone.
