= The Carnegie Hall Performance =

Live album by Lewis Black
- Released: April 25, 2006
- Recorded: September 24, 2005
- Venue: Carnegie Hall, New York City
- Genre: Comedy
- Length: 85:31
- Label: Comedy Central Records
- Producer: Dan Schlissel, Jack Vaughn Jr. (executive producer)

Lewis Black chronology
Luther Burbank Performing Arts Center Blues (2005)	The Carnegie Hall Performance (2006)	Anticipation (2008)

The Carnegie Hall Performance (2006) is Lewis Black's fifth album, and winner of the Grammy Award for Best Comedy Album at the 49th Annual Grammy Awards. Several pieces are derived from material that was published in his 2005 autobiography, Nothing's Sacred.

== Track listing ==
1. It's Just Not Right – 3:20
2. Mom and Pop – 1:25
3. Dr. Fuck Phil (Or, How Do You Top This) – 2:01
4. Getting Old Sucks – 1:02
5. Yom Kippur – 5:10
6. Candy Corn – 6:24
7. We Don't Know What We Are Doing Anymore: Air Traffic Control – 9:30
8. New Orleans – 5:28
9. Information – 4:45
10. Headlines Are Punchlines and Crazy Is Crazy – 4:45
11. That's Fucked Up – 2:01
12. The Real Problem Is Gay Marriage – 3:24
13. Rick Santorum: Idiot – 3:58
14. Congressional Correspondents Dinner – 17:23
15. Mom and Pop and Paul – 2:21
16. Terry Schiavo – 6:34
17. Dead President – 4:54
18. Thank You and Goodnight – 1:06

== Notes ==
On the first track, Lewis joked that a rule at Carnegie is that he was not allowed to say fuck more than 12 times. Over the course of the album, he says it at least 75 times.

The first track on the album features a hidden track. The track can be heard by playing the beginning of track one and then using the rewind/search button to go back 8:49.

== Personnel ==
The album was produced by Dan Schlissel, and mixed and engineered by Ian Stearns, Leszek Maria Wojcik, and Scott Jacoby, who shared in the Grammy awarded to the album.
