= Randy Liedtke =

American comedian, actor and podcaster

- Born: 1984 (age 41–42)
- Occupations: Comedian; actor; podcaster; producer
- Years active: 2007–present

Comedy career
- Medium: Stand-up; podcast; television; film
- Genres: Surreal comedy; deadpan comedy; anti-humor; observational comedy; anecdotal comedy
- Subjects: American culture; pop culture; human behavior; social awkwardness

Randy Liedtke (born 1984) (Note: Lidetke has stated his age multiple times, in his standup (see reference 1) and in his Indiegogo crowdfunding campaign for his video Randy Wants to try Marijuana) is an American stand-up comedian, actor, producer and podcaster originally from Oregon. He is known for his televised stand-up comedy and podcast work.

Liedtke guest-starred on @midnight and Comedy Bang! Bang! and has appeared on numerous comedy shows and podcasts. He formerly hosted The Bone Zone podcast with Brendon Walsh, with whom he has also collaborated with on other projects.

Liedtke has appeared in minor roles in several TV series including Maron, Garfunkel and Oates, and as a voice actor in Adventure Time. He has also appeared in film, as Stoner Lou in Expecting (2013) and in Slingshot Cops (2016) alongside Walsh, among other projects.

== Personal life ==
Liedtke is based in Los Angeles, but grew up in Oregon. Prior to starting a career in entertainment, Liedtke attended college and intended to pursue work in advertising. Following a breakup with his then girlfriend, he was inspired to move to Los Angeles after a friend did the same.

In 2013, Liedtke claimed he was taken into a police station over a warrant for unpaid parking tickets, after provoking a police officer to pull him over in his car as part of a recorded prank. Liedtke had been driving whilst holding a smartphone-shaped cookie, which he proceeded to eat in front of the officer. However, some have speculated the incident was staged.

Liedtke has previously admitted to creating social media hoaxes for the purpose of comedy, including a Twitter hoax in 2013 involving a fake account for Pace Foods. He uses social media as part of his surreal comedy style, such as posting a recipe for a Bloody Mary featuring a full pizza, burger, and fried chicken on a skewer.

== Career ==
Liedtke's early comedy career began with Internet videos and podcasts in the late 2000s. In 2008, Liedtke co-created a YouTube channel named CurtandRandy, writing and starring in a series of skits. In 2007, he performed shirtless at the 28th annual Seattle International Comedy Competition.

In the early 2010s, he began hosting comedy podcasts, notably the 2012 podcast The Bone Zone with comedian and collaborator Brendon Walsh. They would co-host the show for several years, before parting ways in the late 2010s.

=== Television and film ===
Since 2010, Liedtke has appeared in a number TV shows and movies playing minor characters. He was the voice of Randy and Hot Dog Knight in two episodes of the cartoon series Adventure Time. He has also played small roles in films, namely made-for-TV productions, appearing as Stoner Lou in Expecting (2013) and Elden in Slingshot Cops (2016).

In 2017, Liedtke reunited with Walsh to star and produce Weird Uncles, a project developed by Comedy Central.

In 2018, Liedtke released Randy Wants to try Marijuana, a 23-minute mockumentary which he produced and stars in, in which he smokes cannabis for the first time. It was developed by Funny or Die and released online. Liedtke used the crowd-funding website Indiegogo to raise funds for the production, receiving US$1,765 of its $10,000 goal. The concept was created in response to the absurdity of conflicting cannabis laws across different state lines.

=== Stand-up comedy ===
Liedtke performed stand-up comedy on Late Night with Seth Meyers in 2014, and on Conan in 2015. He was a recurring guest in series 8 of Last Comic Standing and series 3 of @midnight.

In 2014, Liedtke performed at the Just For Laughs festival in the "New Faces" showcase. That same year, LA Weekly listed him in their article "10 Comedy Acts to Watch in 2015."

In October 2015, Liedtke performed a special in season 4 of The Half Hour. Following this, he released his debut comedy album I'm On A Roll with Comedy Central Records.

Liedtke has previously toured and performed in festivals including the Moontower Comedy & Oddity Festival in 2016 and SF Sketchfest in 2015.

=== Podcasts ===
Liedtke was the co-host of The Bone Zone, a podcast which ran from 2012 until approximately 2022, when it became the World Record Podcast. Liedtke was not involved in the new podcast. In 2015, Liedtke started New Podcast, his own short-lived project.

Liedtke has been a guest on various other comedy podcasts, including with Joe Rogan and Joey Diaz on the Ice House Chronicles recorded at Ice House Comedy Club.

== Filmography and discography ==
=== Comedy specials ===
Year	Title	Format
2015	The Half Hour	Comedy Central, television
2015	I'm On a Roll	Album

=== Film ===
Year	Title	Role	Notes
2010	Break Up Breakdown	Andy	
2013	Expecting	Stoner Lou	
2014	It's Only Temporary	Mason	
2016	Slingshot Chops	Elden	
2017	Flulanthropy	Producer	Consulting producer

=== Television ===
Year	Title	Role	Notes
2010	Remember When	Randy	3 episodes
2012	Garfunkel and Oates		1 episode
2011–2013	Adventure Time	Randy, Hot Dog Knight #3	2 episodes
2013–2015	Maron	Tom	2 episodes
2014	Last Comic Standing	Himself	3 episodes
2014	Late Night with Seth Meyers	Himself	Guest
2015	Comedy Bang! Bang!	Himself	1 episode
2015	Drunk Driving with Brad Gage	Himself	2 episodes
2015	Conan	Himself	Guest
2015–2016	Inside Joke at Moontower	Himself	2 episodes
2015–2016	@midnight	Himself, Pterodactyl hunter	6 episodes
2016	The Night Time Show with Stephen Kramer Glickman	Himself	Guest
2017	Late Tonight with Nick Burton	Himself	Guest
2017	The Guest List	Himself	1 episode
2017	Last Call with Carson Daly	Himself	Guest
2018	Another Period	Ku Klux Klan member	1 episode
2018	Alone Together	Paul	1 episode
2019	Our House	Marty	Pilot
2020	Gary Busey: Pet Judge	Himself	
2020	Tacoma FD	Tripping Santa, Norman	1 episode
2021	Top Secret Videos	Ryan	1 episode

=== Web ===
Year	Title	Role	Notes
2017	Mythical Busters	Gary	Loot Crate video
2018	Randy Wants to Try Marijuana	Himself, producer	Funny or Die short
