= Retaliation (Dane Cook album) =

Live album by Dane Cook
- Released: July 26, 2005
- Recorded: 2004
- Genre: Comedy
- Length: 52:12 (Disc One); 51:16 (Disc Two); 103:28 (Total)
- Label: Comedy Central Records
- Producer: Brian Volk-Weiss; Dane Cook; Jack Vaughn; Barry Katz

Dane Cook chronology
Harmful If Swallowed (2003)	Retaliation (2005)	Vicious Circle (2006)

Professional ratings
Review scores
Source	Rating
AllMusic	4/5 stars
Okayplayer	4/5 stars

Retaliation is the second album by American comedian Dane Cook. It was released on July 26, 2005, by Comedy Central Records.

The CD contain a concert done by Cook at the Comedy Connection in Boston, Massachusetts. The DVD contains Dane's appearances on Shorties Watchin' Shorties and Crank Yankers, Comedy Central's Denis Leary Roast, and Comedy Central's Bar Mitzvah Bash. The Crank Yankers call Foreign Guy English Lessons is previously unreleased.

The album debuted at No. 4 on the Billboard 200, which was the most successful comedy album debut since Steve Martin's A Wild and Crazy Guy in 1978. It went gold six days after its initial release and platinum on November 30, 2005. Retaliation achieved double platinum status on February 15, 2007.

As of 2014, sales in the United States have exceeded 1,376,000 copies, according to Nielsen SoundScan.

== Track listing ==
=== Disc 1 – Want ===
1. "Intro / Riot" – 2:00
2. "Struck by a Vehicle" – 3:33
3. "Superbleeder" – 0:39
4. "Legacy" – 1:15
5. "Someone S#!t on the Coats" – 1:33
6. "Abducted" – 2:54
7. "Punkass / Are You Out of Your F!#kin' Mind?!" – 1:13
8. "Driveway Intruder" – 1:15
9. "Car Alarm" – 3:42
10. "Heist / Monkey" – 4:38
11. "BAMF" – 2:20
12. "Dream House" – 3:59
13. "At the Wall" – 10:44
14. "The Chicken Sangwich the Heckler and the Kabbash" – 12:31

=== Disc 2 – Need ===
1. "Intro / The Dane Train" – 0:53
2. "Itchy Asshole" – 0:44
3. "Superpowers" – 2:00
4. "The Friend Nobody Likes" – 2:23
5. "Obby" – 3:05
6. "Creepy Guy @ Work" – 3:23
7. "L-O-V-E" – 2:01
8. "Turn On's Slash Turn Off's" – 1:47
9. "Exaggerating GF / Bachelor" – 2:05
10. "The Nothing Fight" – 6:06
11. "Making Up" – 5:59
12. "My Son Optimus Prime" – 1:53
13. "One Night Stand / DJ Diddles" – 10:53
14. "Where's the Handle?" – 3:49
15. "Let's Do This, I'm a Cashew" – 4:11

=== DVD – Have ===
1. Cook appearances on Shorties Watchin' Shorties
2. Cook appearances on Crank Yankers
3. Unedited Comedy Central's Bar Mitzvah Bash
4. Unedited Comedy Central's Denis Leary Roast
5. Tourgasm Teaser

== Charts ==
=== Weekly charts ===
Chart (2005)	Peak position
US Billboard 200	4
US Top Comedy Albums (Billboard)	1
US Independent Albums (Billboard)	1

=== Year-end charts ===
Chart (2006)	Position
US Billboard 200	103
US Top Comedy Albums (Billboard)	1
Chart (2007)	Position
US Top Comedy Albums (Billboard)	3

== Certifications ==
Region	Certification	Certified units/sales
Canada (Music Canada)	Platinum	100,000^{^}
United States (RIAA)	2× Platinum	2,000,000^{^}
^{^} Shipments figures based on certification alone.

== Legacy ==
The term Karen from Cook's sketch "The Friend Nobody Likes" has become an internet meme that references stereotypes that are common to "basic white women"; the most notable is the stereotype that a Karen will demand to "speak with the manager" of a hypothetical service provider.

== Controversy ==
A 2007 article in Radar magazine about joke theft noted widespread internet discussion of the similarity between the bits "Struck by a Vehicle", "Itchy Asshole", and "My Son Optimus Prime" from Cook's 2005 album Retaliation and the bits "Guy on a Bike", "Itchy Asshole", and "Kid's Names" from comic Louis C.K.'s 2001 album Live in Houston.
