= Luther Burbank Performing Arts Center Blues =

Studio album by Lewis Black
- Released: January 25, 2005
- Recorded: June 18, 2004, at Santa Rosa, California
- Genre: Comedy
- Length: 58:29
- Label: Comedy Central Records
- Producer: Jack Vaughn Jr.

Lewis Black chronology
| Rules of Enragement (2003) | Luther Burbank Performing Arts Center Blues (2005) | The Carnegie Hall Performance (2006) |

Luther Burbank Performing Arts Center Blues is Lewis Black's fourth album. It was nominated for a Grammy for Best Comedy Album in 2006. It was recorded at the Luther Burbank Center for the Arts in Santa Rosa, California (which has since been renamed the Wells Fargo Center for the Arts). In 2016, it was renamed back to the Luther Burbank Center for the Arts. A limited vinyl edition of 500 for this release was issued by Stand Up! Records. The cover art was modified to look like a road case which contains a microphone.

Professional ratings
Review scores
| Source | Rating |
|---|---|
| AllMusic | 4/5 stars |

== Track listing ==
1. "Superbowl Redux" – 3:50
2. "MTV" – 3:44
3. "Halftime '04" – 3:04
4. "What Sex...........Are They?" – 2:17
5. "Gay Marriage" – 6:25
6. "Justin and Janet" – 3:59
7. "America Loses Its Mind" – 4:29
8. "Nipple Clamps" – 2:46
9. "One Nation Under God" – 3:52
10. "Michael Jackson, Arnold Schwarzenegger, and Ronald Reagan" – 4:05
11. "Voting (a Flashback)" – 3:32
12. "Iraq, an Idiot's Delight" – 16:23
