= Kyle Cease =

American actor

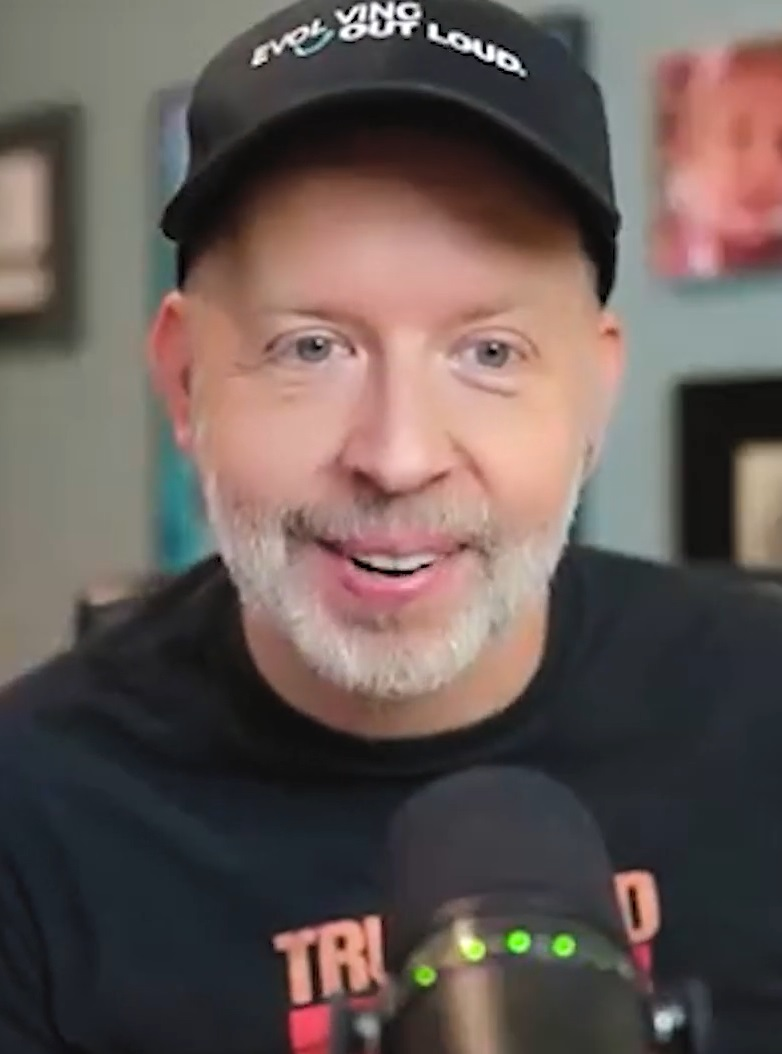
- Cease in 2023
- Born: Bothell, Washington
- Occupation(s): Actor, comedian, motivational speaker

Kyle Cease is an American motivational speaker and former actor and comedian.

== Career ==
While still residing in his hometown of Bothell, Cease was cast as Bogey Lowenstein in the 1999 movie 10 Things I Hate About You. Right after the film, he moved to Los Angeles. Two years later he was featured in Not Another Teen Movie, as the slow clapper. In the same year, he released his first CD, Wait Your Turn. He has made appearances on The Martin Short Show, One on One, Tuned Up, VH1's Super Secret Movie Rules, and in 2005, the movie The Hand Job. Cease has released a DVD of his nationwide tour called One Dimple. The DVD contains a road documentary, commentary and a performance clip of him on Premium Blend. He was also on Chelsea Lately and other shows that featured his off the cuff style.

In 2010, Cease released another Comedy Central album, entitled I Highly Recommend This.

He had a Comedy Central Presents special in 2006. He has had hundreds of TV and movie appearances in different commercials, sitcoms and late night shows, etc.

In 2007 Cease had a 1-hour Comedy Central special called Weirder Blacker Dimpler.

== Filmography ==
- 10 Things I Hate About You (1999)
- Not Another Teen Movie (2001)

== Albums ==
Album cover	Date of release	Title	Label	Chart positions	Sales
	Unknown, 2001	Wait Your Turn	N/A	N/A	N/A
	July 11, 2006	One Dimple	Comedy Central Records	N/A	N/A
	September 4, 2012	I Highly Recommend This	Comedy Central Records	9 (Top Comedy Albums)	N/A

== Works ==
- I Hope I Screw This Up: How Falling In Love with Your Fears Can Change the World (2018) ISBN 978-1501152108
- The Illusion of Money: Why Chasing Money is Stopping You from Receiving It (2019) ISBN 978-1401957445
