= Dane Cook =

American comedian and actor (born 1972)

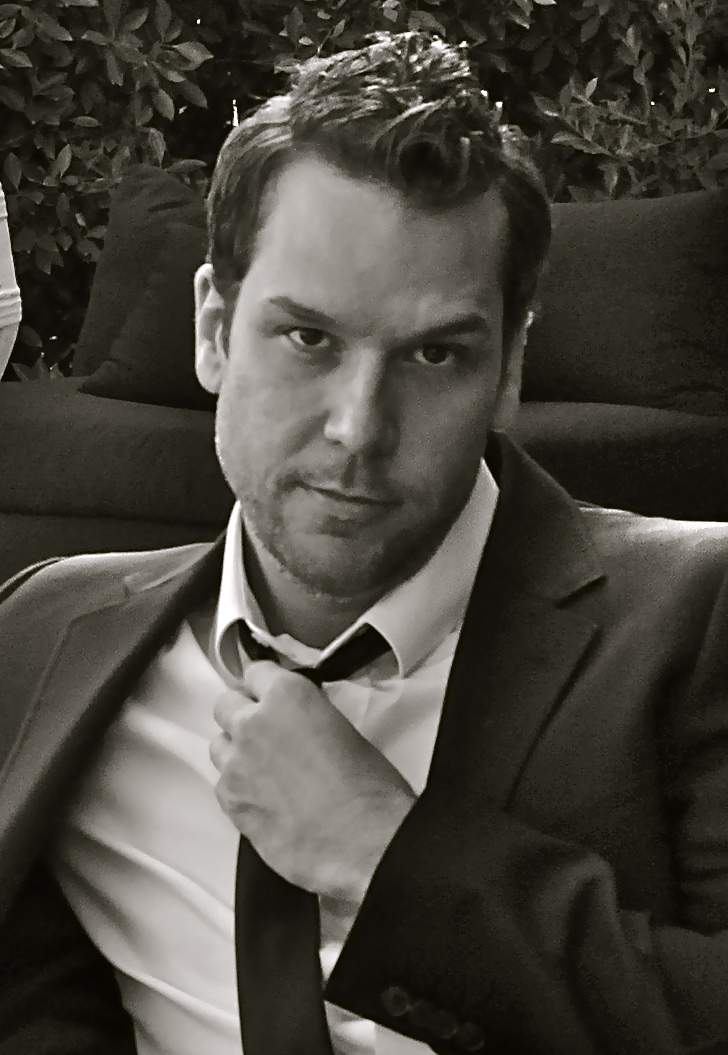
- Cook in 2011
- Born: Dane Jeffrey Cook; March 18, 1972 (age 54); Cambridge, Massachusetts, U.S.
- Occupations: Comedian; actor
- Years active: 1990–present
- Spouse: Kelsi Taylor (m. 2023)

Comedy career
- Medium: Stand-up, film, television
- Genre: Observational comedy
- Subjects: Human behavior; human sexuality; American politics; gender differences
- Website: danecook.com

Dane Jeffrey Cook (born March 18, 1972) is an American stand-up comedian and actor. He is known for his use of observational, often vulgar, and sometimes dark comedy. He has released five comedy albums: Harmful If Swallowed (2003), Retaliation (2005), Vicious Circle (2006), Rough Around the Edges: Live from Madison Square Garden (2007), and Isolated Incident (2009).

He is one of the first comedians to use a personal webpage and Myspace to build a large fan base, and in 2006 was described as "alarmingly popular". Cook starred in numerous films such as Employee of the Month (2006), Good Luck Chuck (2007), and My Best Friend's Girl (2008). He also acted in Mystery Men (1999), Waiting... (2005), Dan in Real Life (2007), Mr. Brooks (2007) and provided the lead voice role in the 2013 animated sports comedy film Planes, and its 2014 sequel Planes: Fire & Rescue as Dusty Crophopper.

He was the second comedian (after Andrew Dice Clay) to sell out Madison Square Garden's large arena space. In 2006, Retaliation became the highest-charting comedy album in 28 years and went platinum. He performed an HBO special in late 2006, Vicious Circle, a straight-to-DVD special titled Rough Around The Edges (which is included in the album of the same name), and a Comedy Central special in 2009 titled Isolated Incident.

== Early life and education ==
Cook was born in Cambridge, Massachusetts, the second son of Donna Jean (née Ford; died 2006) and George F. Cook (died 2007). He has an older half-brother, Darryl, and five sisters. He grew up in a Catholic family of Irish descent.

Cook has described himself as having been "pretty quiet, pretty introverted, shy" as a child, although he was a "wild child" at home. He overcame his shyness in his junior year of high school, when he began acting and doing stand-up comedy. After graduating from high school, he studied graphic design in college as a back-up plan, in case he did not achieve success in comedy. He now designs all of his merchandise, including the cover of his album, Harmful If Swallowed.

== Career ==
=== Early work ===
In 1990, Cook began performing stand-up in comedy clubs.

On October 30, 1992, Cook and a group of local emerging improv/sketch comedians were scheduled to appear at the Boston Garden as part of local radio station WBCN's "Rock of Boston" music concert. Although they anticipated appearing earlier in the lineup, they were scheduled to perform between popular band Spin Doctors and the final headline act Phish, making them somewhat nervous but determined to do well. Moments after they took the stage however, the crowd, neither expecting nor appreciating a comedy act at this late stage in the evening's program and impatient for Phish to go on, expressed their displeasure by throwing their shoes at the stage. Robert Kelly, also on stage as a member of the comedy group, pleaded with the audience to settle down and let them perform their act; the crowd instead escalated to throwing lighters. Sustaining minor injuries, Cook and the comedy group left the stage. Cook described the incident – as well as how dejected he felt and his resulting determination to someday return to the Boston Garden and perform successfully someday – as part of a web series for The Tonight Show entitled "Worst I Ever Bombed".

=== Stand-up ===
==== 1990s ====
In 1994, Cook moved to New York City and began performing. Two years later, he moved to Los Angeles, where he still lives today. His big break came in 1998 when he appeared on Comedy Central's Premium Blend. In 2000, Cook did a half-hour special on Comedy Central Presents. Since then his special has won the Comedy Central Stand-up showdown twice in a row.

==== 2000s ====
In 2003, Cook released his first CD/DVD, Harmful If Swallowed. He signed a contract with Comedy Central Records. The album is certified platinum. He released his second CD/DVD in 2005, entitled Retaliation. This album went double platinum and made Cook the first comic in 27 years to have an album in the top 5 on the Billboard charts after Steve Martin's A Wild and Crazy Guy moved as high as number two in late 1978. He performed at the MTV Video Music Awards, and then afterwards he joined Snoop Dogg in presenting the award for Best New Artist.

On April 15, 2005, Cook performed his first HBO Special entitled Vicious Circle. Vicious Circle was filmed "in the round" at the TD Garden. The same year, Cook shot two pilot episodes for his own sitcom, Cooked. The sitcom was not picked up and the two pilot episodes were later released on DVD as the Lost Pilot. That same year, he embarked on a 30-day, 20-show college tour called Tourgasm with his longtime friends Robert Kelly, Gary Gulman, and Jay Davis. The tour was filmed and was later made into a 9-episode documentary on HBO.

On December 3, 2005, Cook hosted Saturday Night Live (SNL). He would then go on to host the premiere of season 32 of SNL a year later. The same year Cook launched his own company, Superfinger Entertainment, in order to produce his own albums and videos.

In 2006, Cook headlined for Dave Attell's Insomniac Tour and hosted the 2006 Teen Choice Awards alongside Jessica Simpson. The following year he won the award for Best Comedian. On November 12, 2007, Cook became the second comic to sell out Madison Square Garden's large arena space after Andrew Dice Clay accomplished this feat in 1990. He did two sold-out shows in one night. The show was filmed and would later be put onto a DVD to be sold on Cook's third comedy album. Cook won the Big Entertainer Award at the VH1 Big in '06 Awards, and Rolling Stone magazine's Hot Comic of the Year. The following day, November 13, 2007, he released his third CD/DVD entitled Rough Around The Edges, which was filmed live at Madison Square Garden in New York City. During that time, he embarked on his first arena tour.

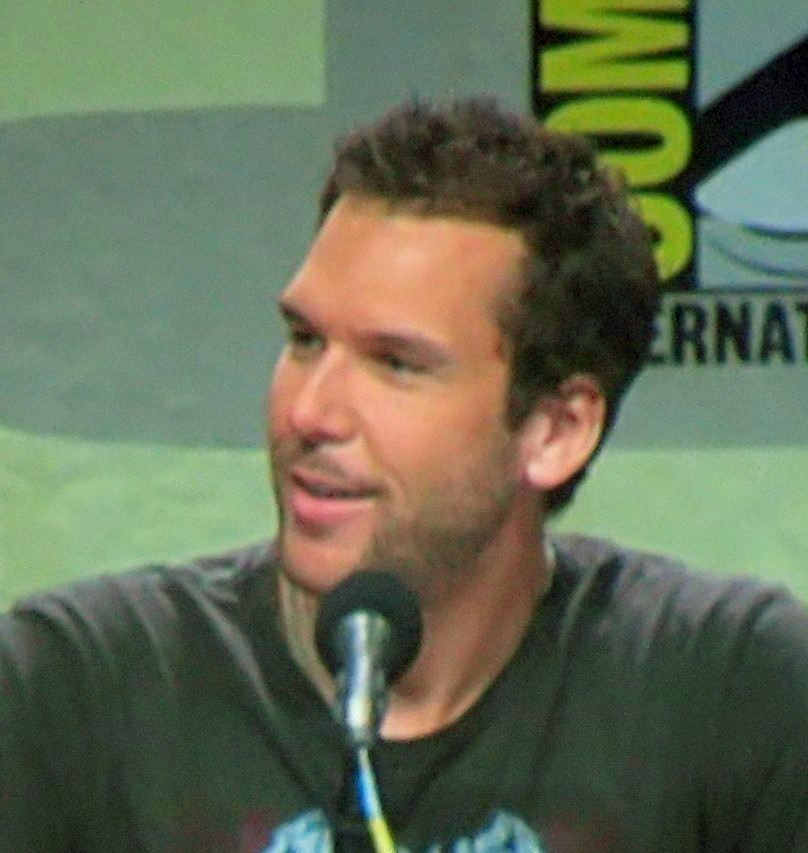
Cook at Comic Con 2007 promoting Good Luck Chuck

On April 10, 2007, Cook broke the Laugh Factory's endurance record (previously held by Richard Pryor) by performing on stage for three hours and 50 minutes. Dave Chappelle would break the record five days later by performing for six hours and seven minutes. Chappelle beat that record on December 3, 2007, by performing for six hours and twelve minutes. On January 1, 2008, Cook broke Chappelle's record, by performing on stage for seven hours.

From May 23, 2008, to May 25, 2008, Cook reunited with Robert Kelly and Al Del Bene for three shows at The Coliseum in Caesars Palace. From May 29-June 4, 2008, the trio went to Iraq to perform for the troops. Del Bene was the Emcee, Kelly was the feature, and Cook was the headliner.

He finished his fourth album, Isolated Incident; a performance which aired on Comedy Central on May 17, 2009, with the release of the record following two days later. He kicked off that tour at the Mohegan Sun in Uncasville, Connecticut, on April 25, 2009. This album was the last as part of Cook's four-record deal with Comedy Central Records. The new album was performed at Laugh Factory in Hollywood, which is considered to be Cook's home base, where he goes to work on new material. He released the DVD version of Isolated Incident in November 2009.

==== 2010s ====
In 2012, Cook caused a minor controversy when a joke he made in a comedy club about the 2012 Aurora, Colorado, shooting was recorded and made the headlines:

So I heard that the guy came into the theater about 25 minutes into the movie. And I don't know if you've seen the movie, but the movie is pretty much a piece of crap… Yeah, spoiler alert. And I know that if none of that would have happened, I'm pretty sure that somebody in that theater, about 25 minutes in, realizing it was a piece of crap, probably was like, "Ugh fucking shoot me".

He later apologized on Twitter: "I am devastated by the recent tragedy in Colorado & did not mean to make light of what happened. I made a bad judgment call with my material last night & regret making a joke at such a sensitive time. My heart goes out to all of the families & friends of the victims."

In 2014, Showtime aired Cook's Troublemaker special.

In September 2016 Cook headlined with Sebastian Maniscalco at the Oddball Comedy Festival in Dallas, Texas, and the Oddball Comedy & Curiosity Festival in Irvine, California. He also toured Canada in November at the annual Montreal "Just For Laughs" comedy festival.

In May 2018 he performed at Hard Rock Rocksino in Northfield Park, Ohio.

At the end of 2018 Cook announced the "Tell It Like It is" Tour, his first full-scale stand-up tour since "Under Oath" in 2013. The tour began in February 2019 in Huntington, New York and concluded in November in Los Angeles, California.

=== Film ===
Cook began his film career with small roles in the late 1990s, including Mystery Men as "The Waffler", and opposite Dennis Rodman in 1999's Simon Sez.

In 2006, Cook starred in his first leading role as Zack Bradley in Employee of the Month, which co-starred Jessica Simpson and Dax Shepard. The film made a modest $30 million against a $12 million budget. In June 2007, Cook co-starred in his first dramatic role as the devious photographer "Mr. Smith" in Mr. Brooks, which starred Kevin Costner. The film debuted at number 4 at the box office, grossing $10,017,067 in its opening weekend and $48 million in total.

In September 2007, Cook starred as dentist Charlie Logan in Good Luck Chuck, which co-starred Jessica Alba and Dan Fogler. The film was the second-highest-grossing film (number one comedy) at the U.S. box office in its opening weekend, grossing $13.6 million in 2,612 theaters. The film went on to have a total box office tally of approximately $35 million U.S. and $24 million foreign. A month later, Cook co-starred as Mitch Burns in Dan In Real Life, which starred Steve Carell. The film grossed $11.8 million in 1,921 theaters its opening weekend, ranking number 2 at the box office. As of July 6, 2008, it has grossed $62,745,217.

In 2008, Cook starred as air purifier call-center supervisor Tank Turner in My Best Friend's Girl with Kate Hudson, Jason Biggs, and Alec Baldwin. The film grossed $8.2 million in its opening weekend, debuting at number three at the box office. In 2010, Cook claimed that he had auditioned for the role of Captain America for Captain America: The First Avenger, although director Joe Johnston did not have him on the short list for the part.

In 2013, Cook voiced the character of Dusty Crophopper in the animated film, Planes, a spin-off of Pixar's Cars franchise. He reprised his role as Dusty in the 2014 sequel Planes: Fire & Rescue.

In 2015, Cook starred in the film 400 Days with Brandon Routh, Caity Lotz, and Ben Feldman. The film was directed by Matt Osterman and executive produced by Cook.

=== Stage ===
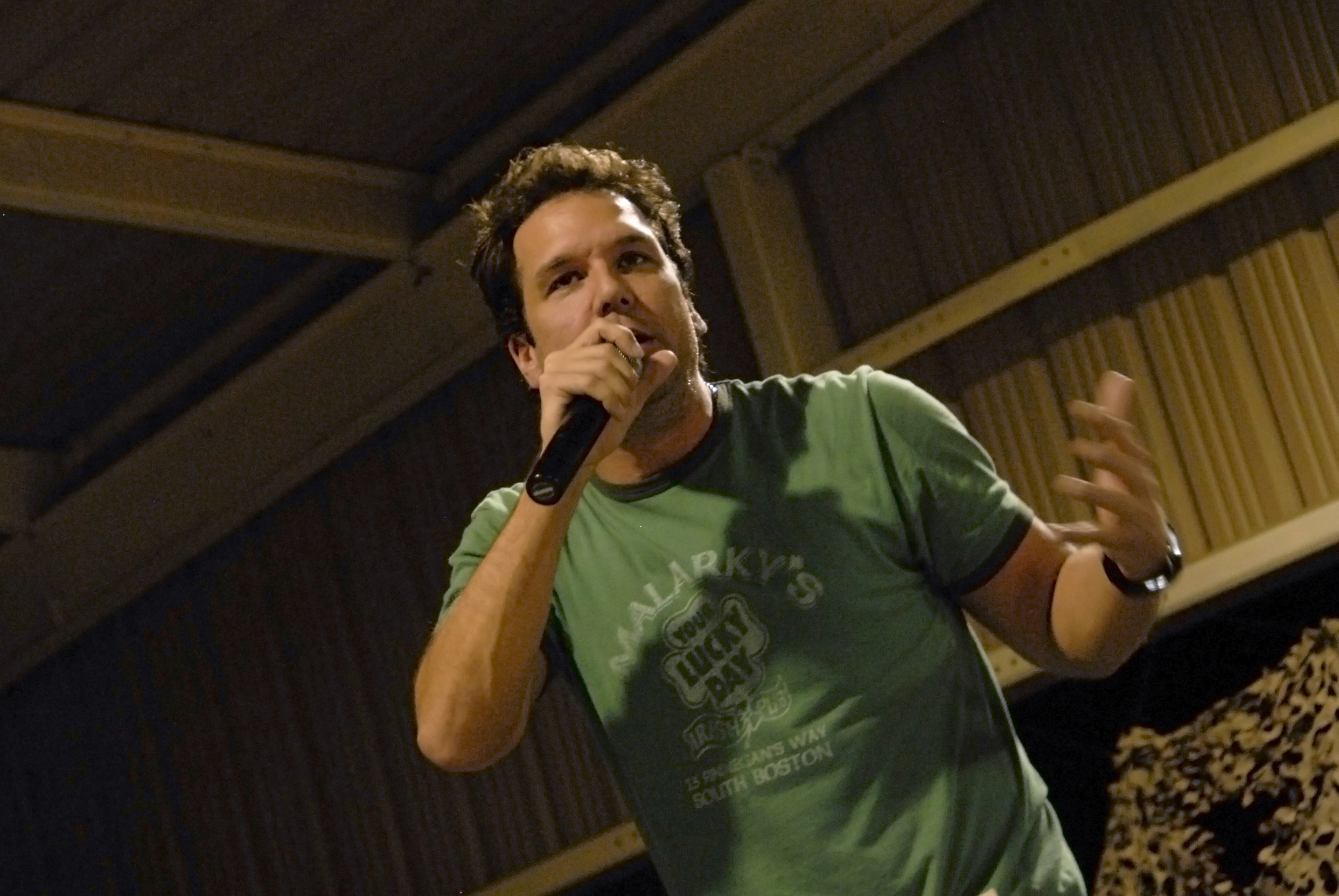
Cook at a USO tour in 2008

On November 18, 2010, it was announced that both Cook and Josh Hamilton would be starring in Neil LaBute's 2011 Broadway production of Fat Pig; however, before the show began it was postponed for financial reasons.

In 2012, he played Franz Liebkind in the Hollywood Bowl production of The Producers.

=== Television ===
His first TV role was playing a quarterback named Kyle on the 1995 ABC comedy Maybe This Time, which starred Marie Osmond, Betty White and Ashley Johnson.

In October 2005, during an interview with Jay Leno on The Tonight Show with Jay Leno, actress Charlize Theron leaned forward and allowed Cook to kiss her backside.

In May 2012, it was announced that Cook would be starring in the new NBC comedy Next Caller. On October 12, 2012, the show was canceled prior to its airing after filming four out of six episodes.

== Comedic style ==
Cook's style is principally "long-form storytelling" and "multipurpose phrases". Cook says his onstage persona is a combination of the personalities of his mother, Donna, and his father, George. "My mother is like a Looney Tunes cartoon. She's wiggly ... She has the ability to tongue in cheek a lot, and do it in a way where she's being physical. My dad is the polar opposite. He always had a little 'what the fuck' in his voice. Even if he knew nothing about what he was talking about, he could sell it. So I looked at these two extremely funny people and created a style of comedy from absorbing their actions."

He explains:

I wanted to create a stage persona for myself that allowed me to really speak about anything I want... So I can be a storyteller, I can be jokey, I can be corny, I can be a little vulgar, I can be a lot vulgar. And I'm not afraid to go anywhere to get the point of the joke across, even if I have to just blabber like a retard until it becomes apparent that I'm a retard and that the audience should laugh.

=== Reception ===
One reviewer noted that Cook attracted a young, growing audience through colorful observations and high-energy performances.

Commentators in a variety of media sources have characterized Dane Cook's humor as unfunny. Comedian Ron White has criticized Dane Cook for his lack of real material and for his inflated ego, saying: "[He] does not make me laugh, at all, in any way, shape or form." When asked about his opinion of Cook on The Howard Stern Show, comedian Nick DiPaolo said "he doesn't make me laugh, but that doesn't mean he's not funny." On Boston radio station WBCN, Dane Cook was named by radio show Toucher and Rich to a tournament of the top 16 "Worst Comedians" and, based on listener voting, was voted the "Worst Comedian" of all. In the Michigan Daily, Elie Zwiebel and co-author Jesse Bean wrote that "he's managed to become one of the most overrated comics ever" and that his act is "boringly stagnant". In an interview with Jason Tanamor of Zoiks! Online, Tanamor asked Cook why he was so despised. Cook stated that he'd had conversations with his therapist, attributing some of the negativity to his alpha demeanor. Add to that, Cook's highly successful career. "Unfortunately, what you find is, you know in your graduating class with the guys you came up with, there's going to be some dudes in front of you that don't want you catching up, and there's going to be some guys behind you that maybe they've never had an opportunity. That, coupled with, like you said, reaching the Billboard charts with 'Retaliation' and a lot of people going, 'Who the fuck does he think he is?'

Jim Breuer talked about Cook's reputation within the comedy industry, saying: "Everyone kills this guy ... Not one comedian comes on [my Sirius radio show] and says 'I'm so happy for him', which is weird. ... They can't stand this poor guy." Breuer went on to say that he personally thinks Cook is a "tremendous performer".

Paul Provenza said that he was not a fan of his earlier work, but "...caught a couple of Dane Cook shows at the Laugh Factory in Los Angeles, and he was fantastic", and became a fan because he felt he had "matured".

=== Accusations of plagiarism ===
Comedian Joe Rogan claimed that Cook performed a bit on an episode of Premium Blend that Rogan had developed on I'm Gonna Be Dead Someday, and claimed to have performed the routine earlier in clubs with Cook present. In 2010, Rogan had Cook as a guest on his podcast, telling him that he was a "good dude" and that he was "...glad we put all that shit past and hung out...I think you are doing some awesome shit." Cook replied: "That means the world hearing that from you, Joe ... You've got a lot of integrity and I've always had a lot of respect for you."

There was also widespread Internet discussion regarding three bits from Cook's 2005 album Retaliation, and similar bits from comic Louis C.K.'s 2001 album Live in Houston. In 2011, Cook played himself in an episode of Louie, scripted by C.K., centering on a fictional encounter between the two comics during which they discuss the controversy. In an interview in 2012, Louis C.K. defended Cook, saying: "I don't think he stole from me knowingly... I think he sort of got some of my jokes in his head and got sloppy. He's a good guy and not capable of maleficence."

== Tours ==
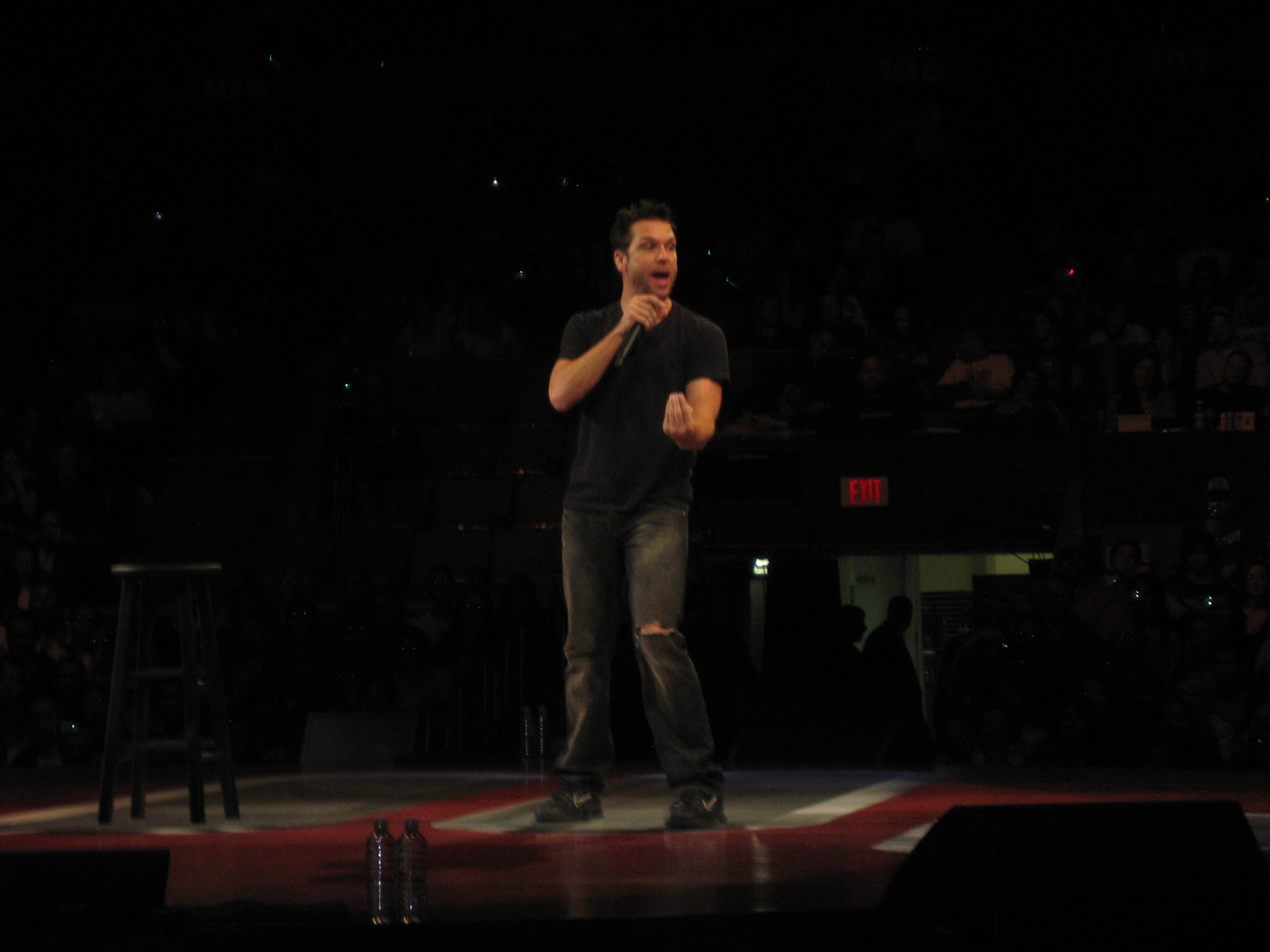
Cook at Madison Square Garden in 2008

- Tourgasm 2005 (w/ Robert Kelly, Gary Gulman, Jay Davis)
- Dave Attell's Insomniac Tour 2006 (w/ Dave Attell, Greg Giraldo and Sean Rouse)
- Rough Around The Edges Tour 2007
- Globo Thermo Tour 2008 (w/ Robert Kelly and Al Del Bene)
- Isolated Incident 2009
- Under Oath 2013
- Tell It Like It Is Tour 2019

== Personal life ==
Cook's half-brother, Darryl McCauley, served as his business manager until 2008, when Cook discovered that McCauley and his wife Erika had embezzled at least $12 million from him. They were charged with embezzlement and larceny in 2010, and pleaded guilty. Darryl was sentenced to six years in prison and 16 years of probation, and Erika was sentenced to three years in prison and 13 years of probation. Both were ordered to pay restitution to Cook.

Cook says he has never had a drink of alcohol or done drugs.

In 2017, Cook began dating fitness instructor Kelsi Taylor, who is 26 years his junior. They became engaged on July 13, 2022. The couple married on September 23, 2023, in a ceremony at a private estate in Oʻahu, Hawaii.

== Discography ==
=== Albums ===
Albums by Dane Cook
Title	Details	Peak chart positions				
Title	Details	US	US Heat	US Indie	US Comedy	CAN
Harmful If Swallowed	Released: July 22, 2003	67	19	25	2	—
Retaliation	Released: July 26, 2005	4	—	1	1	—
Vicious Circle	Released: November 28, 2006	—	—	—	—	—
Rough Around the Edges: Live from Madison Square Garden	Released: November 13, 2007	11	—	3	1	20
Isolated Incident	Released: May 19, 2009	4	—	1	1	5
I Did My Best: Greatest Hits Album	Released: November 22, 2010	165	—	15	1	94
"—" denotes the album didn't chart.

=== Other releases ===
- 2006: Dane Cook's Tourgasm (3DVD)
- 2007: The Lost Pilots (DVD) Sony Pictures Television.

=== Singles ===
- "I'll Never Be You" (2006)
- "Forward" (2007)
- "Drunk Girl/Red Car" (2010)

Cook co-wrote and performed the song "Ruthie Pigface Draper" for the Dan In Real Life film with Norbert Leo Butz.

Cook provided guest vocals on the 2011 song In the Future by Steel Panther from their third studio album Balls Out.

== Filmography ==
Dane Cook filmography
Year	Title	Role	Notes
1995–1996	Maybe This Time	Kyle	9 episodes
1997	Flypaper	Tim	
1997	Buddy	Fair Cop	
1999	Spiral	David	
1999	Simon Sez	Nick Miranda	
1999	Mystery Men	The Waffler	
2000	Comedy Central Presents	Himself	Stand-up comedy series Episode: June 28, 2000
1999–2001	The Late Show	Himself	Episode: April 12, 1999; Episode: March 14, 2001
2002	L.A.X.	Terrell Chasman	
2002	The Touch	Bob	
2002–2007	Crank Yankers	Sav McCauley / Jack Larson / Foreign Guy	4 episodes
2003	Stuck on You	Officer Fraioli	
2003	8 Guys	Dane	
2003	Windy City Heat	Roman Polanski	Television film
2004	Mr. 3000	Sausage Mascot	Voice
2004	Torque	Neal Luff	
2004	Good Girls Don't...	Max	Episode: "Whatever Happened to Jane's Baby?"
2005	Waiting...	Floyd	
2005	London	George	
2005	Duck Dodgers	Van Chancy	Episode: "The Kids Are All Wrong/Win, Lose or Duck"
2006	Employee of the Month	Zack Bradley	
2007	Farce of the Penguins	Online Penguin	Voice
2007	Mr. Brooks	Mr. Smith	
2007	Good Luck Chuck	Chuck/Charlie	
2007	Dan in Real Life	Mitch Burns	
2008	My Best Friend's Girl	Tank Turner	
2010, 2019	Laugh Factory	Himself / Comedian	Episodes: "Dane Cook: Laugh Factory Birthday", "Flashback Fridays: Birthday Jokes"
2011	Answers to Nothing	Ryan	
2011	Hawaii Five-0	Matt Williams	Episode: "Loa Aloha"
2011	Louie	Himself	Episode: "Oh Louie/Tickets"
2011	Detention	Principal Karl Verge	
2012	Guns, Girls and Gambling	Sheriff Hutchins	
2012–2013	Next Caller	Cam	5 episodes
2013	Planes	Dusty Crophopper	Voice
2014	Planes: Fire & Rescue	Dusty Crophopper	Voice
2014	Comedy Bang! Bang!	Himself	Episode: "Dane Cook Wears a Black Blazer & Tailored Pants"
2015	400 Days	Cole Dvorak	Also executive producer
2017	American Gods	Robbie	
2018	Robot Chicken	Harriet's Boss / Braveheart Mouse / Dave Seville	Voice Episode: "3 2 1 2 333, 222, 3...66?"
2018	The American Meme	Himself	Documentary film
2019	American Typecast	Alex	Also producer, writer and director
2019	American Exit	Charlie	
2026	Funny Money: The Dane Cook Story	Himself	
