= Nick Thune =

American actor, comedian, and musician

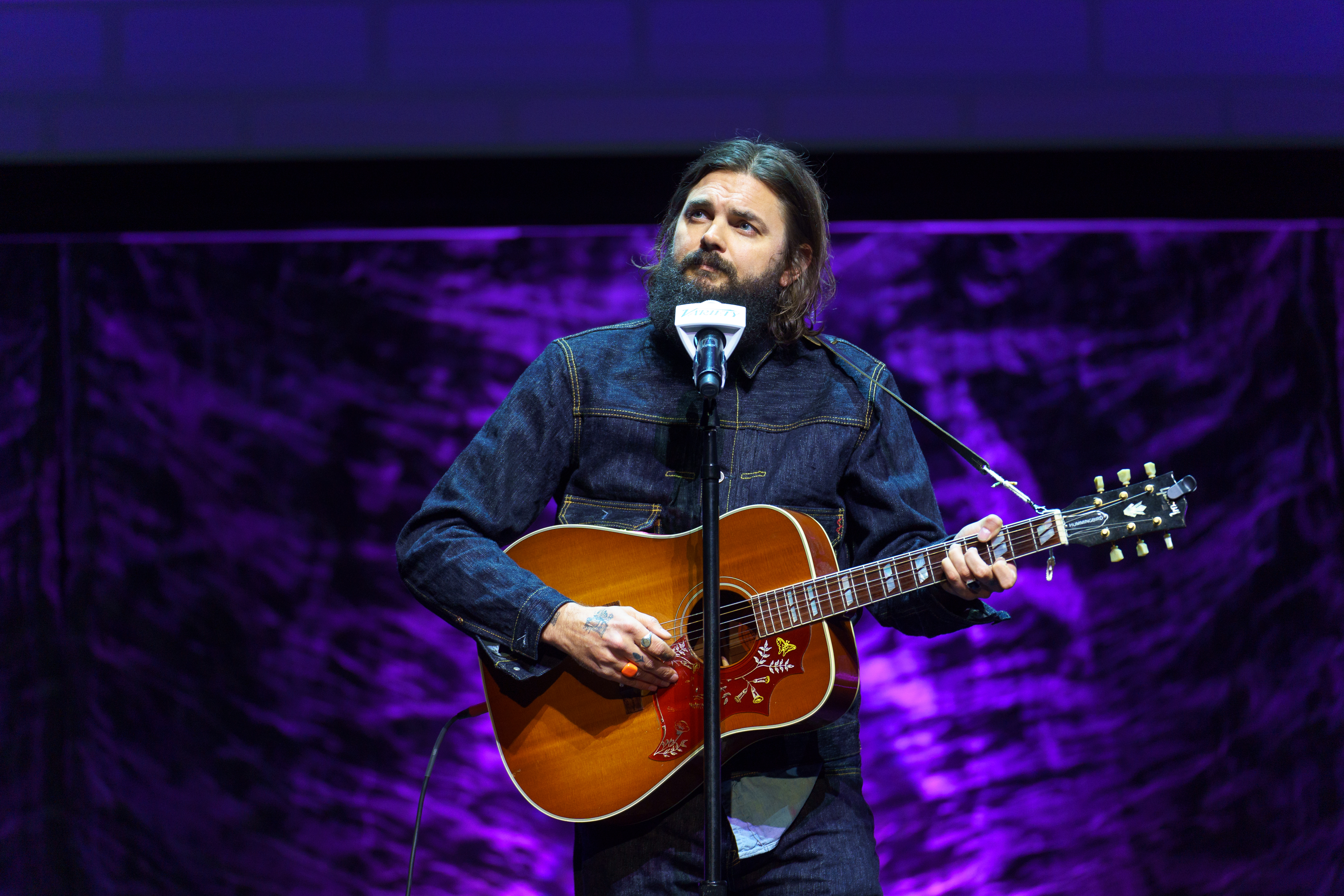
- Thune performing at SXSW 2024
- Born: Nicholas Ivan Thune; December 8, 1979 (age 46); Seattle, Washington, U.S.
- Occupations: Actor; comedian; musician
- Children: 1

Comedy career
- Medium: Stand-up, television, film
- Genre: Anecdotal comedy
- Website: NickThune.com

Nicholas Ivan Thune is an American actor, comedian, and musician.

== Life and career ==
Thune was born in Seattle, Washington, and grew up in Redmond. Thune moved to Los Angeles to pursue his career in stand-up. His early stand-up shows focused on wordplay while he played the guitar, which he has said was used as more of a prop than to create musical comedy. He has performed on The Tonight Show eight times, and was featured in a Comedy Central Presents special in 2007.

In February 2009, Thune performed at the DTD Reality concert at the University of Southern California.

Thune's debut album, Thick Noon, was released on February 23, 2010, by Comedy Central Records.

Thune's first hour-long stand-up special, Nick Thune: Folk Hero, premiered on Netflix in February 2014. The special was later released on CD and vinyl.

His second hour-long special, Good Guy, premiered on December 22, 2016 on NBC's Seeso platform. The special was filmed in October 2016 in Portland, Oregon. Much of the special was based on the thoughts Thune had prior to having his first child. The special is a change in style for him, as he no longer used his guitar throughout the performance. He first started performing without his guitar after breaking his arm in Tampa, and while continuing work without being able to play the guitar, he realized he enjoyed being on stage without it.

=== Television ===
Thune was cast as a lead in the 2010 NBC pilot for Beach Lane starring opposite Matthew Broderick. However, the pilot was not picked up as a series. He has since made guest appearances on the comedy programs Traffic Light and Happy Endings in 2011, and Don't Trust the B— in Apartment 23 in 2012.

Thune worked on a pilot in 2016 with his creative partner Kevin Parker Flynn, Holy Sh*t, a workplace comedy about a small church avoiding a mega-church takeover. The pilot was produced by Mila Kunis' production company.

Thune had a guest starring role on HBO's Love Life as Magnus, one of the relationships opposite Anna Kendrick during Season 1.

=== Film ===
Thune had small roles in the movies Knocked Up and Unaccompanied Minors. In 2017, Thune starred in Dave Made a Maze, playing the titular character. He also starred in the film People You May Know, directed by Sherwin Shilati.

== Personal life ==
Thune and his now ex-wife have one son.

== Discography ==
- Thick Noon (2010)
- Folk Hero (2014)
- Good Guy (2017)

== Filmography ==
Television
Year	Title	Role	Notes
2009	The Very Funny Show		
2010	Beach Lane	James Wilson	TV movie
2011	I Hate That I Love You	Brad	TV movie
2011	Traffic Light	Ben	Episode: "Pilot"
2011	Happy Endings	Tommy	Episode: "Barefoot Pedaler"
2012	Don't Trust the B— in Apartment 23	Willoughby	Episode: " A Weekend in the Hamptons..."
2013	Burning Love	Teddy	Recurring
2013	Crazytown	Boomer	TV movie
2013	Above Average Presents		Episode: "Finish What We Started - Behind the Scenes"
2013	Laugh Trek		4 episodes
2014	Old Soul	Charlie	TV movie
2014	Tom Green Live	Himself	Episode: "Guests: David Faustino, Stacy Keach & Nick Thune"
2014	Garfunkel and Oates	Nick	Episode: "Speechless"
2014	Comedy Bang! Bang!	Charlie Pedactor	Episode: "Dane Cook Wears a Black Blazer & Tailored Pants"
2015	WTF America	Casey	Pilot
2020	Love Life	Magnus Lund	Episodes: "Magnus Lund", "Luke Ducharme", "Magnus Lund Part II"

Film
Year	Title	Role	Notes
2006	Unaccompanied Minors	Handsome Santa	
2007	Knocked Up	Allison's Friend	
2009	Spring Breakdown	Dan - Announcer	
2009	Extract	Guitar Salesman #2	
2010	Successful Alcoholics	Alex	Short
2010	Ed Hardy Boyz: The Case of the Missing Sick Belt Buckle		Short
2010	Screwball: The Ted Whitfield Story	Petey Sinclair	
2010	Don't Fade Away	Matty P	
2011	Talking Hedz		Short
2011	Poolboy: Drowning Out the Fury	Barry	
2011	Nick and Andy: Coming Soon		Short
2012	Dream World	Deke	
2012	Not That Funny	Norm Getz	
2013	Miles Fisher: Finish What We Started		Short
2014	Bad Johnson	Rich's Penis	
2015	The Breakup Girl	Lewis	
2016	Dreamland	Jason	
2016	Urge	Danny	
2017	Dave Made a Maze	Dave	
2017	Mr. Roosevelt	Eric	
2017	People You May Know	Jed	
2017	61: Highway to Hell	The Haunted	
2018	Venom	Beardo at Bar	
2018	The Possession of Hannah Grace	Randy	
2021	The Right One	Godfrey	
2021	Mixtape	Anti	
