= A Colbert Christmas: The Greatest Gift of All! =

- DVD cover art.
- Written by: Stephen Colbert; Allison Silverman; David Javerbaum; Michael Brumm; Peter Gwinn
- Directed by: Jim Hoskinson
- Starring: Stephen Colbert; Elvis Costello; Toby Keith; Willie Nelson; John Legend; Feist; Jon Stewart; George Wendt
- Composers: David Javerbaum; Adam Schlesinger
- Country of origin: United States
- Original language: English

Production
- Producers: Allison Silverman; Stephen Colbert
- Running time: 60 minutes (including commercials)
- Production company: Spartina Productions

Original release
- Network: Comedy Central
- Release: November 23, 2008

A Colbert Christmas: The Greatest Gift of All! is a Grammy Award-winning Christmas special that debuted on Comedy Central on November 23, 2008.

The plot is that Stephen Colbert of The Colbert Report, while heading to the film studio to shoot his Christmas special with Elvis Costello, becomes trapped in a cabin in "bear country" (upstate New York or Vermont) when he hears a bear prowling outside. A number of his friends stop by the cabin to sing Christmas songs with him as Stephen tries to find ways to escape the cabin and make his Christmas as special as possible, ending by revealing that the titular "greatest gift of all" is the DVD release of the special.

== Cast ==
| Actor | Character |
|---|---|
| Stephen Colbert | Stephen Colbert |
| Elvis Costello | Himself/Bear |
| Toby Keith | Hunter |
| Willie Nelson | The Fourth Wise Man |
| Jon Stewart | Himself |
| John Legend | Forest Ranger |
| Feist | Angel |
| George Wendt | Santa Claus |
| Madeline Colbert; Peter Colbert; John Colbert | Colbert Children |

== Track listing ==
All of the songs in the special were written by David Javerbaum and Adam Schlesinger, except for "(What's So Funny 'Bout) Peace, Love, and Understanding", which was written by Nick Lowe and "Jingle Man, Christmas Boy", written by Colbert himself. "Please Be Patient" was written to the tune of "Angels We Have Heard on High". Schlesinger and Steven M. Gold produced the songs and created the theme music and score for the program.

1. "Another Christmas Song" performed by Stephen Colbert -2.40
2. "Have I Got a Present for You" performed by Toby Keith – 3.19
3. "Little Dealer Boy" performed by Stephen Colbert and Willie Nelson – 2.47
4. "Can I Interest You in Hannukah?" performed by Stephen Colbert and Jon Stewart – 2.59
5. "Nutmeg" performed by Stephen Colbert and John Legend – 2.46
6. "Please Be Patient" performed by Feist – 2.22
7. "(What's So Funny 'Bout) Peace, Love, and Understanding" performed by Stephen Colbert, Elvis Costello, Feist, Toby Keith, John Legend and Willie Nelson – 2.36
8. "There Are Much Worse Things to Believe In" performed by Stephen Colbert and Elvis Costello – 2.43
9. "A Cold, Cold Christmas" performed by Stephen Colbert (iTunes and DVD only) – 3.46

== DVD and music releases ==
The DVD went on sale on November 25, 2008. The special features include "a book burning Yule log, video advent calendar, alternate endings" and additional items, including an extra song "Cold, Cold Christmas". There is also a laugh track option as the special uses stock audience cheers.

However, the DVD differs from the Comedy Central airing in several ways (compared to its premiere on November 23, 2008, at 10 pm). The DVD's laugh track is not the same as the televised version, and it includes 5-second bumps after each act with the wreathed image of a guest, not seen on TV. The DVD includes two brief parts during the introduction to Jon Stewart and John Legend not seen on the TV version: Jon referring to his having a cabin in the woods a half hour earlier, and John extolling rangerhood by saying singing and the ladies in the audience are OK but his passion is moss and leaves.

On the other hand, the DVD is entirely missing one televised part. Comedy Central puts the credits on split screen, and while the DVD just continues the full-screen credits with music, the premiere has a coda with Elvis Costello helping Stephen finish his "Jingle Bells" parody and supplying the missing line "fighting crime with toys", and then Stephen going to put some coffee on, before cutting to split screen ads. This is not included as one of the alternate endings, or anywhere else on the DVD.

In addition, the DVD is missing the commercial/sponsor (Buff your jingle bells) parody that was shown on TV.

The songs from the special were released as a digital-only format available for download on iTunes. As of 2009, the album has not been released on CD. All proceeds from the iTunes and DVD sales go towards the Feeding America charity.

=== Operation Humble Kanye ===
On November 25, 2008, the songs went on sale as an album on iTunes, where, for a short while, it was #1.

This, coupled with Kanye West's belief that he is the "voice of this generation of this decade," prompted Colbert to ask everyone watching his show to download his album on December 3 at 5:00 p.m. Eastern Time, in "Operation Humble Kanye," an attempt to bring him back to the number one spot and earn him the title of the "voice of this generation of this decade". This bumped the album into 2nd place, overtaking West's album. On December 4, Colbert proclaimed Kanye officially humbled.

== Reception ==
The special has received generally favorable reviews. It currently has a Rotten Tomatoes score of 78%. Alessandra Stanley of The New York Times wrote that "Mr. Colbert is delightful, a few of the song parodies are clever, but over all, the show is too long and more than a little strained, much like the holiday specials it mocks". Some critics noted that the production values of the special were low, but Tim Goodman of the San Francisco Chronicle said "that's part of the reason it's so funny". Goodman concluded that "it's not a classic, but there are worse ways to spend an hour". The album won the 2010 Grammy Award for Best Comedy Album.
