= Comedy Central Records =

American record label

- Parent company: Skydance Corporation
- Founded: 2002
- Founder: Jack Vaughn Jr.
- Distributor: Alternative Distribution Alliance
- Genre: Comedy
- Country of origin: U.S.
- Location: New York City, New York
- Official website: cc.com

Comedy Central Records is a record label based in New York and owned by Skydance Corporation. The label specializes in stand-up comedy albums and is distributed by Alternative Distribution Alliance, a subsidiary of Warner Music Group.

The label has released albums from artists such as Aziz Ansari, Louis C.K., Dave Attell, Amy Schumer and Kevin Hart. As of December 2016, Comedy Central Records has issued over 200 albums.

== History ==
=== 2002–06 ===
Comedy Central Records was founded in 2002 by American multi-Grammy winning record and television producer, Jack Vaughn Jr. along with Comedy Central.

The first release under the label was Comedy Central's Crank Yankers, an uncensored album featuring human-like puppets voiced by comedic talent such as Adam Carolla, Jimmy Kimmel, Sarah Silverman and Fred Armisen, making off-color crank calls to one another. Upon its release, the album sold more than 80,000 copies, prompting network executives to release three more volumes of calls, including The Best Uncensored Crank Calls, Vol. 2 and the two part The Best Crank Calls.

In the early years, the label signed talent such as Dave Attell, Daniel Tosh, Dane Cook, Lewis Black and Mitch Hedberg to record deals. Their early releases included Daniel Tosh's True Stories I Made Up (RIAA-certified Gold) and Dane Cook's Harmful if Swallowed and Retaliation (RIAA-certified Platinum and 2× Platinum, respectively).

=== 2007–11 ===
Comedy Central Records received its first Grammy Award nomination in 2006 for Lewis Black's Luther Burbank Performing Arts Center Blues and won its first Grammy a year later for Lewis Black's The Carnegie Hall Performance. The label also received Grammy nominations for albums from Steven Wright, Stephen Colbert and George Lopez, and won Grammy's for A Colbert Christmas: The Greatest Gift of All! as well as Lewis Black's Stark Raving Black. Other notable releases during this period include Jim Gaffigan's platinum-selling King Baby and Demetri Martin. Person., the follow-up album to the RIAA-certified Gold, Martin's These Are Jokes.

Dane Cook continued to be one of the label's biggest names during this time, with his 2007 release, Rough Around the Edges: Live from Madison Square Garden debuting at #11 on US Charts and selling 90,000 copies in its first week. Two years later, the label released Dane Cook: Isolated Incident, with Cook opting to tape this album in front of a smaller crowd of 400 at The Laugh Factory in Los Angeles. Dane Cook's greatest hits album I Did My Best was released on the label in 2010.

Comedy Central Records posthumously released Mitch Hedberg's Do You Believe in Gosh? in 2008. The album was recorded just two months before the comedian's death in 2005.

=== 2012–17 ===
After ten years with Comedy Central Records, Jack Vaughn departed in 2012. Steve Raizes and David Derrick, who were at the time overseeing other businesses within Comedy Central Consumer Products, assumed label management.

The label continued to receive critical acclaim for its top performing talent, including a Grammy win for Louis C.K.'s Hilarious in 2012, and nominations for Lewis Black's In God We Rust in 2013, and Patton Oswalt: Tragedy Plus Comedy Equals Time and Jim Gaffigan's Obsessed in 2014.

Dara Frank, who oversaw production and creative direction for the team began signing new artists to the label in 2015 such as Liza Treyger, Andrew Santino, Sam Morril, Randy Liedtke, Joe List and Michelle Buteau. In 2016 she was promoted to oversee the business.

In 2016, the label partnered with Milan Records, Matt FX, Abbi Jacobson and Ilana Glazer of Comedy Central's Broad City to produce and distribute the original soundtrack for the television show, featuring never before released songs and original artwork by Mike Perry.

That same year, Comedy Central Records released Mitch Hedberg: The Complete Vinyl Collection. The box set was a joint effort with Producer, Michael Slaboch and the late comedian's wife, Lynn Shawcroft who served as an Executive Producer. The collection included never before heard recordings, bonus videos, and a book of rare photos and essays.

Since 2012, the label has released over 100 albums, including releases from Maria Bamford, Chris Hardwick, Marc Maron, Aziz Ansari and Hannibal Buress.

== RIAA Certifications ==
Artist	Album	Award	Format
Dane Cook	Harmful If Swallowed	Platinum	Album
Dane Cook	Retaliation	Platinum 2x	Album
Dane Cook	Rough Around The Edges	Gold	Album
Nick Swardson	Party	Platinum	Video Longform
Daniel Tosh	True Stories I Made Up	Gold	Video Longform
Daniel Tosh	Happy Thoughts	Gold	Video Longform
Bo Burnham	Bo Burnham	Gold	Video Longform
Demetri Martin	These Are Jokes	Gold	Video Longform
Jim Gaffigan	Doing My Time	Gold	Video Longform

== Grammy Award for Best Comedy Album ==
Year	Artist	Album	Result	Ref
2006	Lewis Black	Luther Burbank Performing Arts Center Blues	Nominated	
2007	Lewis Black	The Carnegie Hall Performance	Won	
2008	Steven Wright	I Still Have a Pony	Nominated	
2008	George Lopez	America's Mexican	Nominated	
2009	Lewis Black	Anticipation	Nominated	
2010	Stephen Colbert	A Colbert Christmas: The Greatest Gift of All!	Won	
2010	George Lopez	Tall, Dark & Chicano	Nominated	
2011	Lewis Black	Stark Raving Black	Won	
2012	Louis C.K.	Hilarious	Won	
2012	Patton Oswalt	Finest Hour	Nominated	
2013	Jim Gaffigan	Mr. Universe	Nominated	
2013	Lewis Black	In God We Rust	Nominated	
2014	Jim Gaffigan	Obsessed	Nominated	
2014	Patton Oswalt	Tragedy Plus Comedy Equals Time	Nominated	

== Discography ==
- Comedy Central Records discography

== See also ==
- List of record labels
- List of stand-up comedians
- Stand Up! Records
