= Thoughts and Prayers =

Thoughts and prayers is a phrase commonly used by officials and celebrities, particularly in the United States, as a condolence after a tragedy.

Thoughts and Prayers may refer to:

- Thoughts and Prayers (album), a 2019 album by Good Riddance
- "Thoughts and Prayers" (BoJack Horseman), a 2017 episode of the American animated television series BoJack Horseman
- Thoughts and Prayers (2015 film), an American stand-up comedy film by Anthony Jeselnik
- Thoughts & Prayers (2025 film), an American documentary film by Zackary Canepari and Jessica Dimmock
- "Thoughts & Prayers", a song by Grandson
- "Thoughts & Prayers", a song by Motionless in White from their 2019 album Disguise
- "Thoughts and Prayers", a song by the Raconteurs from their 2019 album Help Us Stranger
- "Thoughts and Prayers", a song by Animals as Leaders from their 2022 album Parrhesia
