= Caligula (Anthony Jeselnik album) =

Live album by Anthony Jeselnik
- Released: January 15, 2013
- Venue: Vic Theatre, Chicago
- Genre: Comedy
- Length: 52:39
- Label: Comedy Central Records

Anthony Jeselnik chronology
Shakespeare (2010)	Caligula (2013)	Anthony Jeselnik: Thoughts and Prayers (2015)

Caligula is the second live album by comedian Anthony Jeselnik, released January 15, 2013 by Comedy Central Records.

== Track listing ==
No.	Title	Length
1.	"Rape"	2:33
2.	"Good Guy"	2:12
3.	"Death"	3:49
4.	"Bad Dates"	3:00
5.	"Ex-Girlfriend"	3:24
6.	"Girlfriend"	7:06
7.	"All Over the World"	3:18
8.	"Delay"	1:44
9.	"Father"	3:46
10.	"Mother"	3:46
11.	"Suicide Chunk"	2:16
12.	"Offensive"	5:57
13.	"Showstoppers"	2:59
14.	"Shut the Fuck Up"	6:49

== Charts ==
Chart (2013)	Peak position
US Billboard 200	194
US Top Comedy Albums (Billboard)	1
US Independent Albums (Billboard)	29
US Heatseekers Albums (Billboard)	5
