= The Pete Holmes Show =

- Created by: Pete Holmes
- Written by: Oren Brimer; Joe DeRosa; Nate Fernald; Pete Holmes; Jamie Lee; Eric Ledgin; Adam Stein; Chris Thayer; Karen Kilgariff
- Presented by: Pete Holmes
- Starring: Pete Holmes; Matt McCarthy
- Country of origin: United States
- Original language: English
- No. of seasons: 2
- No. of episodes: 80 (list of episodes)

Production
- Executive producers: Nick Bernstein; Oren Brimer; David Kissinger; Dave Rath; Jeff Ross; Pete Holmes; Conan O'Brien
- Production locations: Warner Bros. Studios; Burbank, California
- Running time: 22 minutes
- Production company: Conaco

Original release
- Network: TBS
- Release: October 28, 2013 – June 18, 2014

Related
- Conan; Deon Cole's Black Box

The Pete Holmes Show is an American late-night talk show starring comedian Pete Holmes. It aired Monday through Thursday at midnight on TBS, from October 28, 2013 until June 18, 2014. The show was atypical among late-night talk shows for having personal as opposed to topical monologues, more sketch comedy, and taking place within a half-hour format.

== History ==
=== Pilot episodes and pre-production ===
In July 2012, Pete Holmes and Conan O'Brien began developing a show called The Midnight Show with Pete Holmes. Three pilot episodes were shot on the Conan set on August 21 and August 23, 2012. On February 26, 2013, it was announced that the show had been picked up for a seven-week run. On July 19, 2013, it was revealed that the show would be titled The Pete Holmes Show. Pete Holmes officially began work on the show on September 23, 2013. Pete Holmes hosted a panel promoting the show at the 2013 New York Comic Con, showing the show's Ex-Men sketch and a CollegeHumor sketch with his Badman character. Test shows were shot on October 16 and 18, 2013.

=== Debut ===
The debut episode was taped on Tuesday, October 22 and aired on October 28, 2013. The show began with a cold open sketch called "Ex-Men" (a parody of X-Men) in which Pete played Professor X firing Wolverine for being useless. In the monologue Pete told a story of going to an Enrique Iglesias concert. Pete also visited Daily Show host Jon Stewart in New York to seek advice for hosting a talk show. The interview segment featured comedian and long-time friend Kumail Nanjiani as the first guest, and the show closed with the segment "All the Games" in which the titles of lesser-known (fake) video games were shown. The first episode was viewed by approximately 407,000 people.

=== Run and cancellation ===
A total of 28 episodes aired in the show's first season in 2013. On January 8, 2014, the show was renewed for a 13-week second season, beginning on February 24. The show was broadcast Monday through Thursday on TBS at midnight in the United States.

On May 23, 2014, TBS announced the cancellation of The Pete Holmes Show, citing insufficient audience numbers. The show's second and final season ended in June 2014.

== Format and production ==
In the show's first season, episodes began with a cold open pre-taped sketch, were followed by the opening titles, and a personal monologue delivered by Holmes. After the first commercial break, a remote segment or another sketch was shown, or a live comedy bit was performed. The third segment was a short interview, usually with another comedian. The show would close with another short comedy piece. The show's second run featured a less formal structure, relying more heavily on pre-taped interviews. Most notably, the final episode entirely lacked a monologue, and was closed with the show's only musical performance ("Poke" by Scott Hutchison of Frightened Rabbit). Unlike most late-night talk shows (including its lead-in, Conan), The Pete Holmes Show had a half-hour format.

The show was taped in front of a live studio audience on Stage 10 of the Warner Bros. lot in Burbank, California. For budgetary reasons, shows were not taped on the days they air. Conan O'Brien, Jeff Ross, Nick Bernstein, and Dave Rath are presumed to have been involved in production. Show highlights were posted on Pete Holmes's YouTube account.

== Episodes ==
=== Season 1 (2013) ===
No.	Original release date	Original release date
October
1	October 28, 2013	Kumail Nanjiani
Pete visits Jon Stewart in New York.
2	October 29, 2013	Allison Williams
3	October 30, 2013	Jim Jefferies
Pete visits NBA All Star James Harden in Houston.
4	October 31, 2013	Chelsea Peretti
November
5	November 4, 2013	Ike Barinholtz
6	November 5, 2013	Anthony Jeselnik
Pete visits the BET Awards.
7	November 6, 2013	Casey Wilson & June Diane Raphael
Olympic hopefuls Max Aaron and Gracie Gold teach Pete how to skate.
8	November 7, 2013	Deepak Chopra
9	November 11, 2013	Eric André
10	November 12, 2013	Rob Corddry
11	November 13, 2013	Rory Scovel
Pete visits Rachel Maddow in New York.
12	November 14, 2013	Whitney Cummings
Pete practices with US Olympic freeskier Devin Logan in Park City, Utah.
13	November 18, 2013	Jeff Garlin
14	November 19, 2013	Nick Kroll
Pete visits Skyler Grey
15	November 20, 2013	Doug Benson
16	November 21, 2013	Adam Pally
17	November 25, 2013	Joe Mande & Noah Garfinkel
Pete and Lolo Jones win a gold medal in the "Awkward Interaction" Competition.
18	November 26, 2013	Neal Brennan
19	November 27, 2013	Bill Burr
20	November 28, 2013	Conan O'Brien
December
21	December 2, 2013	John Mulaney
22	December 3, 2013	Marc Maron
Pete goes surfing with pastor Rob Bell.
23	December 4, 2013	Iliza Shlesinger
24	December 5, 2013	Tig Notaro
Chelsea Peretti helps Pete with his wardrobe.
25	December 9, 2013	Schoolboy Q
Gabe Liedman performs stand-up.
26	December 10, 2013	Mark-Paul Gosselaar
27	December 11, 2013	Moshe Kasher
28	December 12, 2013	Patton Oswalt
"Gabbin' Like Gals" with Ellie Kemper.

=== Season 2 (2014) ===
No.	Original release date	Original release date
February
29	February 24, 2014	Bode Miller
Pete pitches movie ideas to Judd Apatow.
30	February 25, 2014	T. J. Miller
Pete learns how to MMA fight with Ronda Rousey.
31	February 26, 2014	Kyrie Irving
32	February 27, 2014	Jenny Slate
March
33	March 3, 2014	John Daly
34	March 4, 2014	Nick Thune
Pete talks skiing with 2014 Olympic gold medal winner Ted Ligety.
35	March 5, 2014	Bo Burnham
36	March 6, 2014	Paul Scheer (part 1 interview)
Adam Cayton-Holland performs stand-up.
37	March 10, 2014	Paul Scheer (part 2 interview)
38	March 11, 2014	Devin Logan
39	March 12, 2014	Grace Helbig
Jared Logan performs stand-up.
40	March 24, 2014	David Wolfe
Pete and one of his writers (Joe DeRosa) test out their alternative "I Can't Believe It's Not Butter" titles.
41	March 25, 2014	Erin Hamlin & Kate Hansen
42	March 26, 2014	Lauren Cohan
Eliza Skinner performs stand-up.
43	March 31, 2014	Harrison Barnes
April
44	April 1, 2014	Jason Mantzoukas, Anthony Davis
45	April 2, 2014	Rob Riggle
46	April 3, 2014	Gillian Jacobs
Byron Bowers performs stand-up.
47	April 7, 2014	Matt Berninger
48	April 8, 2014	Dikembe Mutombo
49	April 9, 2014	Jay Larson and Ryan Sickler
50	April 10, 2014	Robert Rodriguez
Brent Sullivan performs stand-up.
51	April 14, 2014	Ashley Rickards, Jillian Rose Reed, Molly Tarlov
52	April 15, 2014	Zach Woods
53	April 16, 2014	Adam Scott, Roy Hibbert
54	April 17, 2014	Jim Jefferies, Jamie Lee
55	April 28, 2014	Jessica St. Clair, Lennon Parham
56	April 29, 2014	Retta
57	April 30, 2014	Bob Mankoff
Pete challenges US Secretary of Education Arne Duncan and President Obama to a game of two-on-two against him and Conan.
May
58	May 1, 2014	Phil Hanley
Joel McHale plays Guile in "Street Fighter Red Tape"
59	May 5, 2014	Adam Pally
60	May 6, 2014	Kristen Schaal
61	May 7, 2014	Jerrod Carmichael
62	May 8, 2014	Trixie Garcia
Zach Sherwin performs.
63	May 12, 2014	Ben Schwartz
64	May 13, 2014	Kumail Nanjiani
65	May 14, 2014	Kid Ink
Dan Telfer performs stand-up.
66	May 19, 2014	Patton Oswalt
Matt McCarthy (comedian) plays Blanka in "Street Fighter Red Tape"
67	May 20, 2014	Thomas Middleditch, Jim Breuer, Matt Braunger
68	May 21, 2014	Nicole Byer, Andy Haynes, Jim Breuer, Matt Braunger
69	May 22, 2014	Joe DeRosa
Rob Huebel plays Magneto in "Ex-Men"
June
70	June 2, 2014	Ray Romano
71	June 3, 2014	Big Jay Oakerson
Patrick Heusinger plays M. Bison in "Street Fighter Red Tape"
72	June 4, 2014	Natasha Leggero
73	June 5, 2014	Eliza Coupe
Beth Stelling performs stand-up.
74	June 9, 2014	Daniel Sloss
75	June 10, 2014	Ben Schwartz, Karl Koppertop
76	June 11, 2014	Schoolboy Q
77	June 12, 2014	Gary Gulman, Martellus Bennett
78	June 16, 2014	Duncan Trussell
79	June 17, 2014	Joe Manganiello
80	June 18, 2014	Andrew W.K., Scott Hutchison
