= Thoughts and prayers =

English-language phrase used when offering condolences

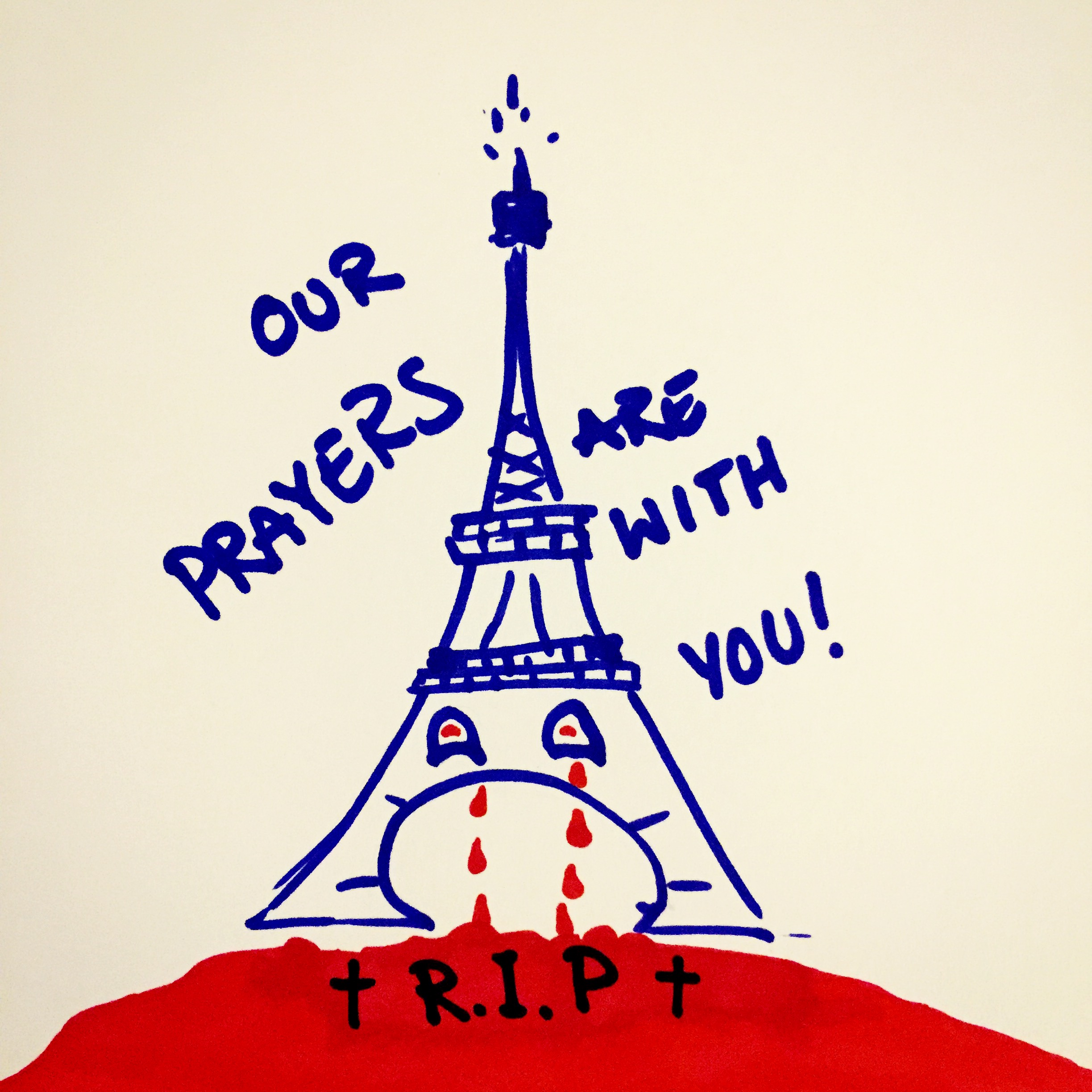
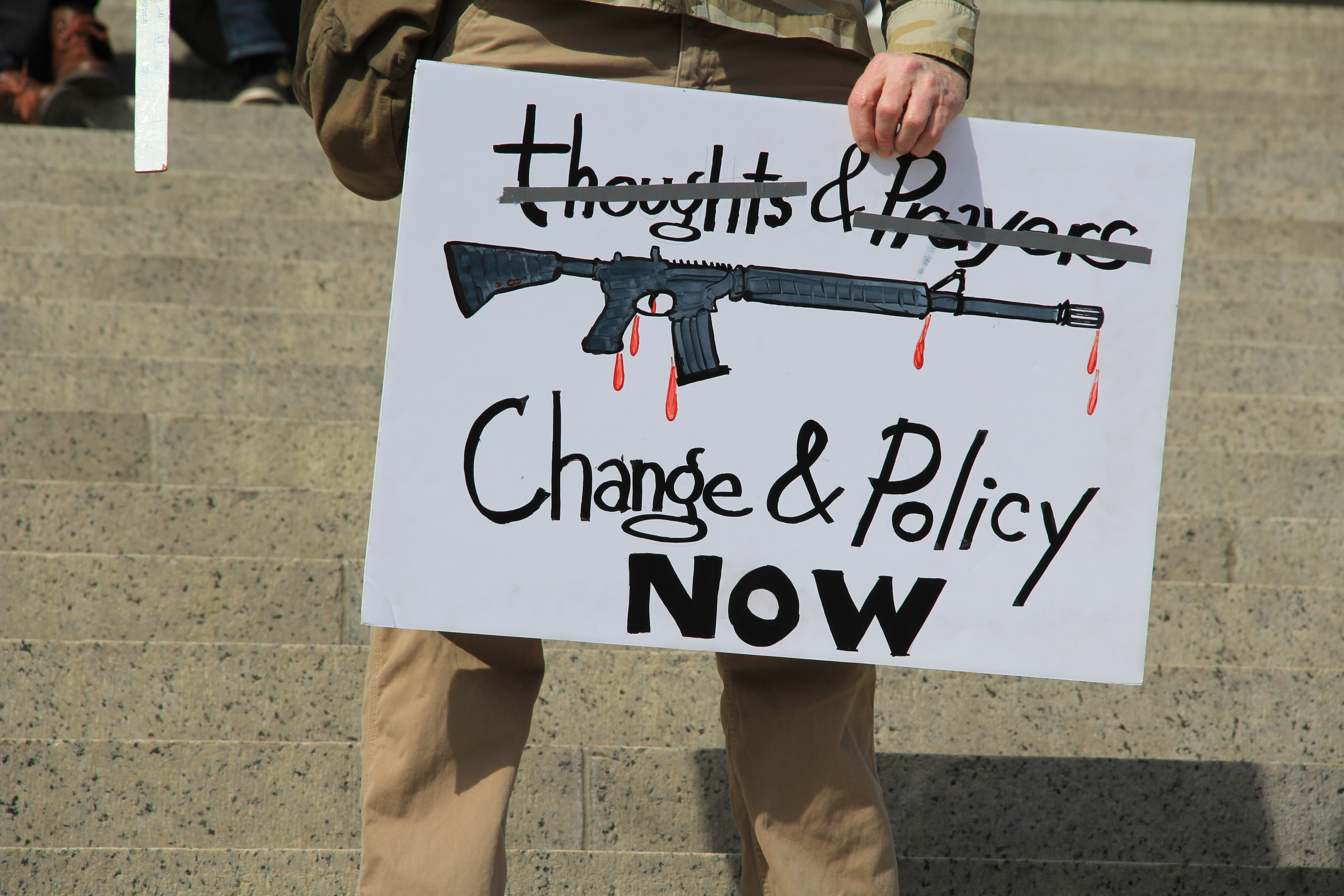
- (Top) A crying Eiffel Tower in remembrance of those victims who lost their lives in the November 2015 Paris attacks (Bottom) Protestor's sign at March for Our Lives, Washington DC (2018)
- Original form: Public expression of condolences
- Context: Natural disaster; gun violence
- Meaning: Token support, moral self-licensing

"Thoughts and prayers" is a phrase commonly used by politicians, public figures, and celebrities, particularly in the United States, as a condolence after a deadly event such as a natural disaster or mass shooting.

Critics of the phrase find it trite from overuse, feeling that it is used as an expression of apathy or a signal that the speaker will take no action to prevent similar events. Gun control activists say the phrase is insulting and used it sarcastically to ridicule the National Rifle Association's financial difficulties.

Defenders of the phrase suggest it is effective in bringing comfort to victims and that critics wish to politicize tragedy.

== History ==
White House spokesperson Sarah Huckabee Sanders using the term "thoughts and prayers" in reference to the 2017 Las Vegas shooting and the victims of Hurricane Maria

After the 2017 Congressional baseball shooting, Nancy Pelosi sends "thoughts and prayers" for Steve Scalise.

The phrase thoughts and prayers is frequently used in the United States as an expression of condolences for victims of natural disasters (e.g. Hurricane Katrina in 2005, the 2010 Canterbury earthquake 2011 Christchurch earthquake, the 2017 Central Mexico earthquake, and Hurricane Maria in 2017). In addition, "thoughts and prayers" are also offered to victims of numerous mass shootings, including the Columbine High School massacre (1999), the November 2015 Paris attacks, the Orlando nightclub shooting, and the 2017 Las Vegas shooting.

Barack Obama used the term throughout his presidency. Following the disappearance of Malaysian Airlines Flight 370, he stated that "our thoughts and prayers are with the families". Later, in 2015, he used the term to criticize inaction on gun violence in the United States, saying that "our thoughts and prayers are not enough" after the 2015 Umpqua Community College shooting.

Additionally, Donald Trump frequently used the phrase, both while campaigning and as U.S. president. In 2016, he used it following the St. Joseph courthouse shooting, the Great Smoky Mountains wildfires, and the shooting of Nykea Aldridge, cousin of professional basketball player Dwyane Wade. In 2017, he used it following the Congressional baseball shooting in June and the Southern California wildfires in December. In 2018, Trump used the phrase following the 2018 Marshall County High School shooting in January, the Carcassonne and Trèbes attack in March, the YouTube headquarters shooting in April, and the Capital Gazette shooting in June.

Scott Morrison, the prime minister of Australia, offered his thoughts and prayers to the victims of the 2019 Australian bushfires in November 2019, for which Morrison was criticized and compared to American politicians who repeated similar phrases in lieu of gun ownership reforms.

== Views ==
After a natural or human-caused disaster, people may be urged to "go beyond thoughts and prayers" by donating blood or sending aid or money to help the victims. After the Las Vegas shooting, authorities said that although thoughts and prayers are appreciated, the most effective way to help was to give blood. Academic studies have been performed on whether an act of token support leads to sustained contributions; the concept of moral self-licensing, in which prior good deeds can empower individuals to subsequently behave badly, or conversely, whether prior immoral actions can lead to compensatory moral actions has also been cited as a factor in the use of "thoughts and prayers" in lieu of action.

=== Criticism ===
As "thoughts and prayers" became associated with post-tragedy condolences, many have criticized the phrase as a form of slacktivism. Jonathan Foiles, writing in Psychology Today, compared the phrase to an infantile response and explained that "'Thoughts and prayers' is the linguistic equivalent of yelling for something to be different when you have the ability to effect that change yourself".

After the 2007 Virginia Tech shooting, Katrina vanden Heuvel, editor of The Nation, called on politicians to "move beyond thoughts and prayers". In her post, vanden Heuvel referred to a press release by Paul Helmke, then-president of the Brady Campaign, who offered his thoughts and prayers but also stated "it is long overdue for us to take some common-sense actions to prevent tragedies like this from continuing to occur."

Video of President Obama delivering a statement on a 2015 shooting and criticizing "thoughts and prayers" (1:22–1:58)

In October 2015, following the Umpqua Community College shooting, US president Barack Obama said that "thoughts and prayers [do] not capture the heartache and grief and anger that we should feel, and it does nothing to prevent this carnage from being inflicted some place else in America next week or a couple months from now." The White House subsequently announced that Obama would continue to take more executive action on the subject of gun control.

On December 2, 2015, in the wake of the San Bernardino mass shooting, Senator Chris Murphy (D-CT) tweeted his frustration with the phrase "thoughts and prayers", a sentiment echoed by the December 3 cover of the New York Daily News, which bore the headline "God isn't fixing this" and included tweets from senators and representatives the newspaper characterized as "meaningless platitudes".

After the Stoneman Douglas High School shooting in February 2018, demands for "policy and change" were used as a pithy rejoinder to the typical "thoughts and prayers" offered by politicians. Student survivors of the shooting were joined by religious leaders in calling for concrete legislative actions.

[Prayers] are something we do when we feel our survival depends so much upon sheer luck that no one can help us but God.

These people, these congressmen and legislators who are praying, are not powerless. There is so much they could do, if only they chose to. When they offer their prayers, they attempt to make it seem as though they are in the same boat as us, their hands sadly tied.

— Jennifer Wright, Harper's Bazaar, August 5, 2019

By August 2019, as reported by the Gun Violence Archive, there were 251 mass shootings in the United States only 216 days into the year. Robin Lloyd, managing director of the nonprofit Giffords, stated "The days when politicians can get away with offering thoughts and prayers are over. The public knows thoughts and prayers won't prevent the next tragedy." Lloyd called upon Senate Majority Leader Mitch McConnell to take action on gun control legislation passed by the House but not heard in the Senate.

After the 2022 Buffalo shooting, New Jersey governor Phil Murphy called for stricter federal and state gun laws. He criticized gun control opponents and conspiracy theorists, saying "I think every single one of them knows where they can shove their 'thoughts and prayers'".

Shortly after the 2023 Michigan State University shooting, Michigan House of Representatives member Ranjeev Puri released a statement which included the phrase "Fuck your thoughts and prayers."

=== Religious criticism ===
Some critics of the phrase "thoughts and prayers" point to the Christian New Testament to argue that action is needed in addition to expressions of faith. One verse cited to back up this argument is James 2:14–16: "What good is it, my brothers, if someone says he has faith but does not have works? Can that faith save him? If a brother or sister is poorly clothed and lacking in daily food, and one of you says to them, 'Go in peace, be warmed and filled,' without giving them the things needed for the body, what good is that?"

=== Defense ===
Laura Coward, a writer for The Huffington Post, defended the use of the phrase "thoughts and prayers", acknowledging the inadequacy of not taking actions, but arguing that prayer "jolts us and disrupts us, removing us from our comfort zones [... it] takes us to uncomfortable places – spiritually, physically and emotionally – and asks us to do the hard work of accepting more than one perspective."

The criticism of the phrase "thoughts and prayers" has itself received criticism as insensitive to those who sincerely pray for victims. Katelyn Beaty argued that prayer "is perhaps the most powerful form of action you can engage in during a crisis", citing studies which showed that regular meditation and prayer improved focus and reduced anxiety, touting the potential beneficial effects for "better policy solutions than would an urgent, fretful, ill-considered response".

In 2019, following a weekend in which mass shootings occurred in El Paso, Texas, and Dayton, Ohio, former Arkansas governor Mike Huckabee suggested that, of the continued occurrence of mass shootings, "the lack of thought and prayers is probably the single biggest factor in what is behind them".

In The Week, Pascal-Emmanuel Gobry wrote that:

Some people have to offer "thoughts and prayers" because they genuinely want to express their grief over an unthinkable act. If the only thing you think about after a tragedy is the next bill that should be passed, then you have no consideration for the victims as human beings — they are simply pawns in your political calculations. You are using still-warm bodies as props in a political marketing campaign — how noble!

According to Mark Tapson of the David Horowitz Freedom Center, the "value of thoughts and prayers is that they help victims and survivors get through an atrocity or tragedy by offering compassion, solace, and encouragement, and by invoking divine healing."

== "Now is not the time" ==
Critics say the use of "thoughts and prayers" can be part of a political effort to avoid legislative action intended to reduce gun violence.

Such efforts can include the use of "now is not the time" and similar phrases to dismiss calls for reforms as inappropriate attempts to politicize a tragedy. Such efforts can also include suggestions for alternatives to gun-control laws such as mental health reform or increased efforts to prevent terrorism.

=== Gun politics in the United States ===
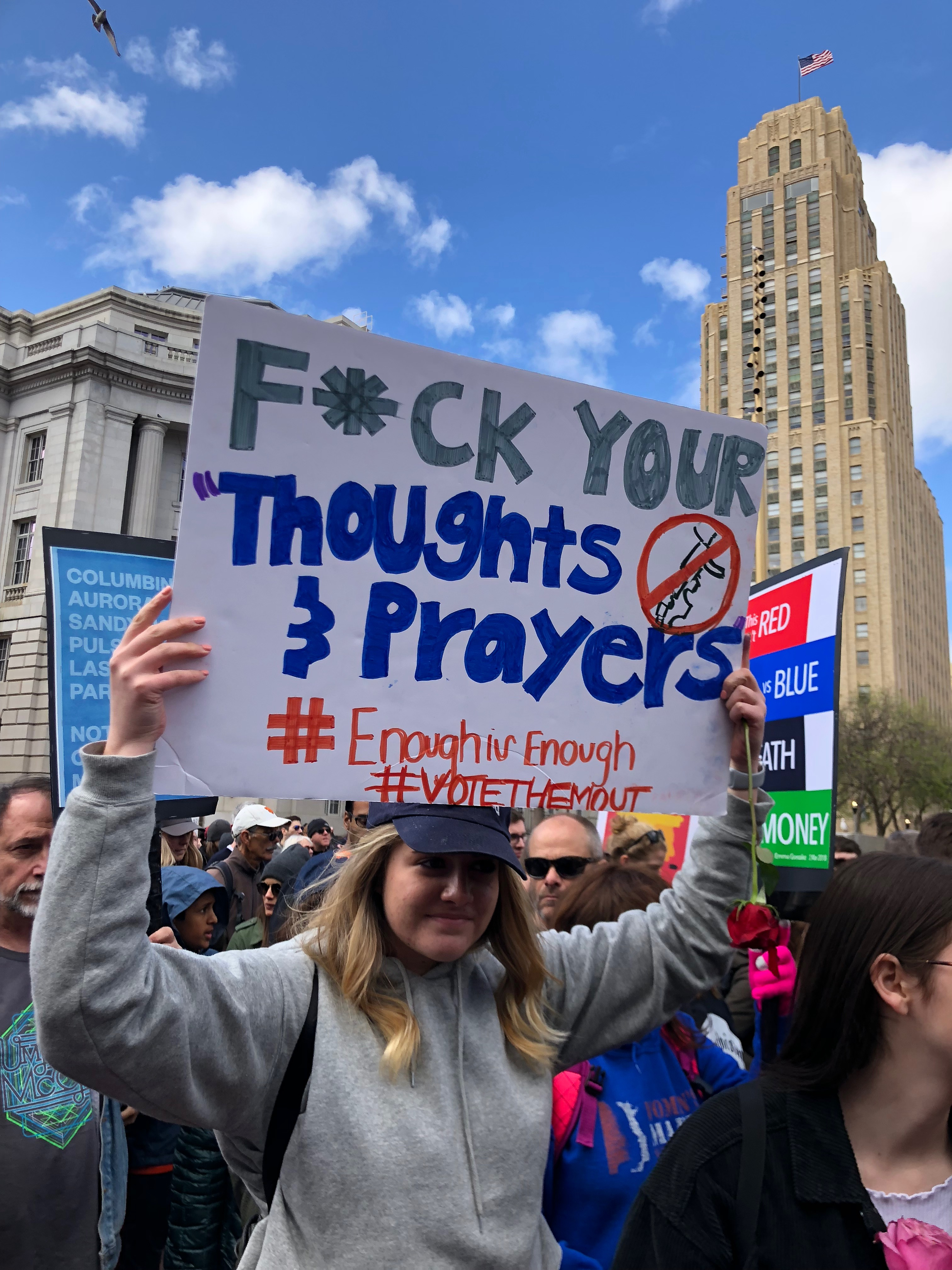
Protest sign decrying the phrase "thoughts and prayers" at March for Our Lives (2018)

Advocacy for gun control legislation in response to gun violence in the United States has been criticized repeatedly by the use of the phrase "now is not the time", offered as a defense against what could potentially be hastily drafted laws. David Weigel pointed out that repeated calls to wait for an "appropriate time" to discuss gun control is the strategy used by the National Rifle Association (NRA) to avoid meaningful legislative action. The BBC called "the enthusiasm gap" the "single biggest obstacle to new gun-control laws" in the United States: "Pro-gun politicians offer their thoughts and prayers, observe moments of silence and order flags flown half-staff. Then, in the quiet, legislative efforts are deferred and ultimately derailed."

Following the December 2012 Sandy Hook Elementary School shooting, several politicians used the phrase "thoughts and prayers" in place of taking immediate legislative action. President Obama called for "meaningful action to prevent more tragedies like this regardless of the politics", and New York mayor Michael Bloomberg challenged him to go further: "the country needs [Obama] to send a bill to Congress to fix this problem – and take immediate executive action. Calling for 'meaningful action' is not enough. We have heard that rhetoric before. What we have not seen is leadership – not from the President and not from Congress. That must end today. This is a national tragedy and it demands a national response." The resulting proposed federal legislation to control guns, including universal background checks, failed to pass Congress; after the bipartisan Manchin-Toomey amendment failed on April 17, 2013, Obama called it "a pretty shameful day for Washington".

Following the Orlando nightclub shooting in June 2016, astronomer and skeptic Phil Plait wrote that while it was "natural and very human" to "send their thoughts and express their grief ... it's cynically hypocritical when politicians do it and nothing else", later noting it was "particularly galling" to see "all the NRA-funded lawmakers tweeting their 'thoughts and prayers'". An accompanying Slate post provided a selected list of members of Congress who had tweeted "thoughts and prayers" along with the amount of campaign contributions they had received from gun rights groups, based on research provided by Igor Volsky of the Center for American Progress. NRA donations to politicians who expressed "thoughts and prayers" in lieu of meaningful gun control legislation were again publicized after the Las Vegas shootings in October 2017 and the Stoneman Douglas shooting in February 2018.

=== Gun control response in other countries ===
After the Christchurch mosque shootings in 2019, prominent international figures offered their thoughts and prayers, including Queen Elizabeth II, Prime Minister of Pakistan Imran Khan, Pope Francis, and President of the Republic of China Tsai Ing-wen. New Zealand legislators responded by passing a law banning the ownership of most semi-automatic weapons aside from pistols under limited circumstances. The response in New Zealand was singled out as a counterexample to "the same old tired script: one politician after another condemning the attack and offering thoughts and prayers to the victims and families. But something different happened. Instead of offering thoughts and prayers, New Zealand's Prime Minister Jacinda Ardern promised action". New Zealand had previously had less restrictions on gun ownership than many other Western countries. Social media posts were made mocking the effectiveness of "thoughts and prayers", comparing the rapid passage of gun control legislation in New Zealand with the repeated failure of United States gun control laws.

In many other Western countries, stricter gun control laws have been passed in response to gun violence. Besides New Zealand, new gun control laws were introduced in the United Kingdom (after the Hungerford massacre in 1987, and again after the Dunblane massacre in 1996), Australia (the National Firearms Agreement, following the Port Arthur massacre of April 1996), Germany (after shootings in Erfurt in 2002 and Winnenden in 2009), and Norway (a belated response to the 2011 Norway attacks). The sustained grassroots campaign that resulted in a ban of all handguns in the UK following the Dunblane massacre of 1996 was contrasted with American inaction in 2018 by a Dunblane resident: "I wouldn't want thoughts and prayers, I would want policies and regulation and a grown-up discussion about changing the American gun culture."

=== Climate change ===
In the wake of the February 2009 Black Saturday bushfires, Australian Prime Minister Kevin Rudd sent his "thoughts and prayers" to those affected; a royal commission was set up to investigate the cause and response. The Climate Institute of Australia and the United Firefighters Union of Australia concluded that climate change had caused the extreme forest fire danger index leading up to Black Saturday and may have contributed to earlier bushfires dating back to 2001.

During the disastrous 2019–20 Australian bushfire season, Prime Minister Scott Morrison and other government officials extended their "thoughts and prayers" to the victims; the phrase was criticized for how it was used to deflect attention away from how climate change and government policy may have affected the duration and intensity of the fire season. Also, PM Morrison was singled out for failing to provide support to fire victims.

David Littleproud, Minister for Agriculture and Water Resources, stated he did not "want to weaponise [climate change policy] in the middle of someone's misery", stating it was "not the time" to discuss the government's policy. Deputy Premier of New South Wales John Barilaro called those who would link climate change to Australia's deadly 2019 bushfires a "bloody disgrace" for politicizing the tragedy.

== In culture ==
=== Visual media ===
In his 2015 stand up special Thoughts and Prayers, comedian Anthony Jeselnik skewers people who tweet out "thoughts and prayers" on the day of a tragedy, calling it a way for those people to garner attention in the face of a tragedy and saying that tweeting thoughts and prayers is so useless that it achieves "less than nothing".

In 2016, a web-based video game, Thoughts and Prayers: The Game, was published to argue that thoughts and prayers have had no effect on saving lives in the context of mass shootings.

The fifth episode of the fourth season of animated series BoJack Horseman, titled "Thoughts and Prayers", presents a real-life shooting that delays the opening of a new movie featuring gun violence.

In the Doctor Who episode "Boom" (2024), robot ambulances use the phrase while killing soldiers. The episode's writer Steven Moffat revealed that its incorporation was to critique its perceived futility, saying, "I thought that if I can just get it in there like, 'Exterminate,' as what evil robots say, then maybe people will stop saying that idiotic phrase."

=== Ironic sympathy for the NRA ===
In early August 2018, after court documents were made public showing the National Rifle Association was having financial issues, satirical tweets were made offering thoughts and prayers for the NRA's troubles. Thoughts and prayers were again directed to the NRA in November 2018 after news broke that free coffee at the headquarters was being discontinued amid a sharp drop in revenue and again in December 2018 after suspected spy Maria Butina pleaded guilty to using her connections with the NRA as a way to infiltrate American conservative groups.

After the state of New York announced it would investigate the tax-exempt status of the NRA in April 2019, Governor Andrew Cuomo announced he would remember the organization in his thoughts and prayers. In June 2019, after the NRA discontinued live programming that had been carried on NRATV, "thoughts and prayers" were sent via social media.

In August 2020, New York Attorney General Letitia James filed a lawsuit against the NRA, seeking to dissolve it for illegal conduct. The NRA is registered in the state of New York as a 501(c)(4) non-profit corporation, and the suit charges the NRA and four named defendants with failure to fulfill their fiduciary duty, resulting in a loss of $64 million in three years. The March for Our Lives organization responded by sarcastically offering 'thoughts and prayers' to the NRA via Twitter.

=== In music ===
A song entitled "Thoughts and Prayers" appears on the 2018 album My American Dream by singer-songwriter Will Hoge, who wrote it after the Sutherland Springs church shooting. Hoge told Rolling Stone writer Jonathan Bernstein "I know that phrase can be a kind and thoughtful way to express sympathy when there is no other way to help, but after these shootings, using that stock response from these cowards on Capitol Hill is incredibly insulting. They have all the opportunities in the world to make a difference, but they do nothing. Then to just send out a phrase like 'thoughts and prayers,' as if we don't all know that there is something they could do? It's shameful."

After the Stoneman Douglas shooting in Parkland, Florida, Canadian-American musician grandson wrote and released the song "thoughts & prayers" on March 23, 2018, which also criticizes politicians who resist "any attempt at meaningful gun reform".

The heavy metal band Motionless in White released a song entitled "Thoughts & Prayers" on June 2, 2019, the first single from their album Disguise. According to Chris "Motionless" Cerulli, "It's my commentary on the very evil ways that [religion is] used".

The Raconteurs also released their album Help Us Stranger in June 2019; the closing track is entitled "Thoughts and Prayers". When asked about that song, Jack White stated "That phrase has become meaningless. It's a thoughtless phrase. Basically an insult."

The punk group Good Riddance released an album entitled Thoughts and Prayers in August 2019. According to Russ Rankin, "I'm sick of hearing that [phrase], especially when there's a mass shooting in New Zealand and the nation takes steps to outlaw semi-automatic weapons in the same week. Meanwhile, here in America, we're dealing with hundreds and hundreds of mass shootings and not doing anything about it."

The Drive-By Truckers publicized their song "Thoughts and Prayers" from the studio album The Unraveling in January 2020, which contains the lyric "stick it up your ass with your useless thoughts and prayers". In his review of the album for Rolling Stone, Jonathan Bernstein characterizes the song as taking aim at the phrase he called "phony right-wing piety".

Filter released "Thoughts and Prayers" ahead of their album Murica in June 2020. Vocalist Richard Patrick called for action in lieu of the phrase: "'Thoughts and Prayers' has become a meaningless catchphrase that gets thrown out every time something bad happens. Usually a mass murder etc. It's an empty gesture. It's time for more than thoughts and prayers."

== See also ==
- List of attacks related to secondary schools
- List of mass shootings in the United States
- List of rampage killers (school massacres)
- Christianese
- Prayer healing and faith healing—more general discussions on effectiveness or lack thereof
- Thought-terminating cliché
- 'No Way to Prevent This,' Says Only Nation Where This Regularly Happens
