= 2018 YouTube headquarters shooting =

Workplace shooting in California, U.S.

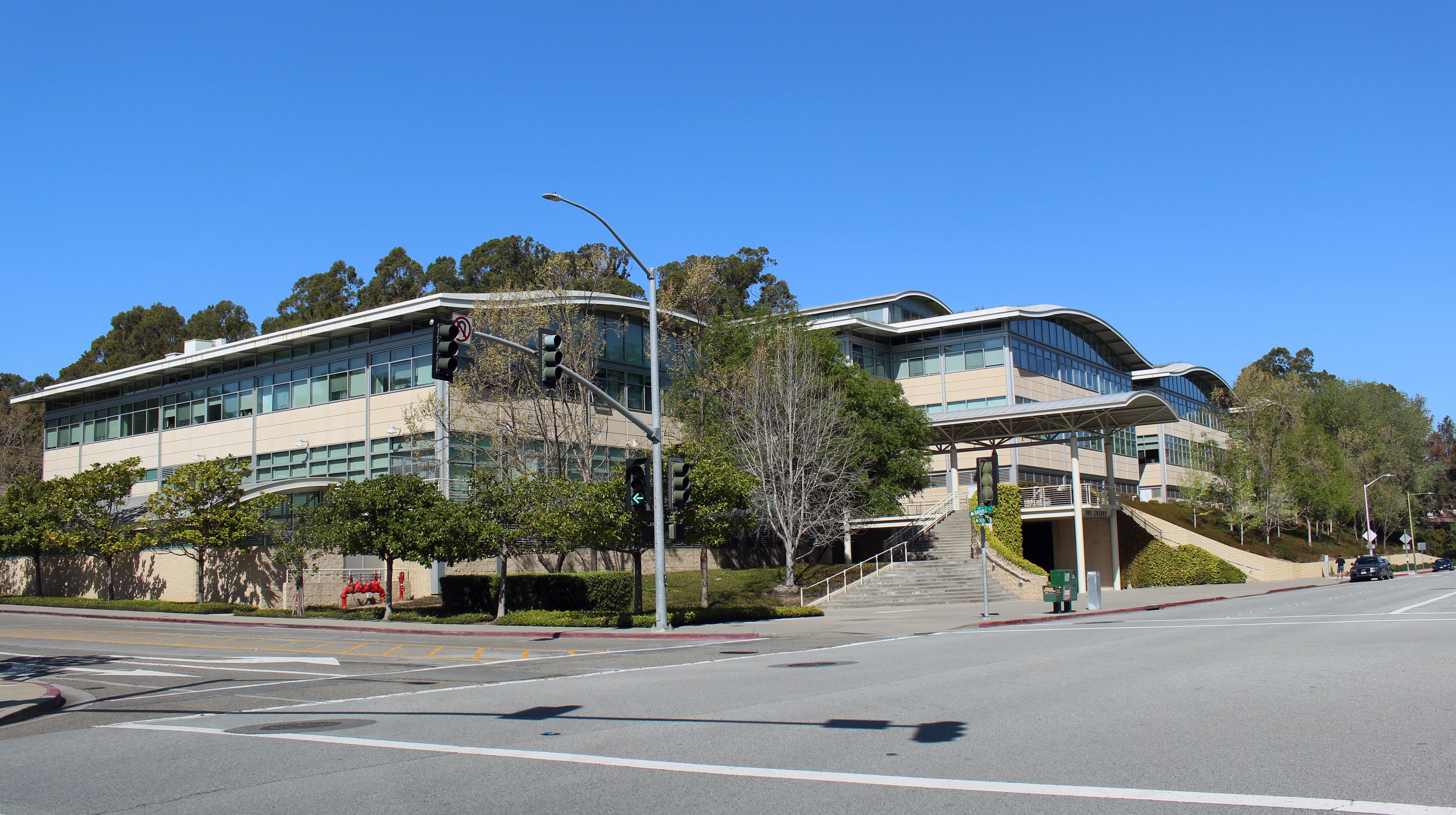
- YouTube's headquarters in San Bruno, California pictured in April 2017

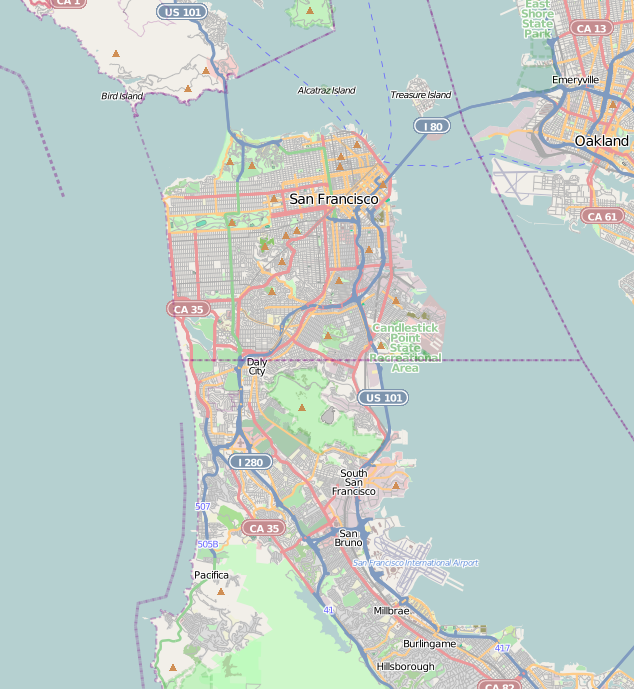
- San Bruno (San Francisco) San Bruno (San Francisco Bay Area) San Bruno (California) San Bruno (the United States)
- Location: 37°37′39″N 122°25′36″W; YouTube headquarters 901 Cherry Avenue; San Bruno, California, U.S.
- Date: April 3, 2018; 8 years ago (PDT, UTC−7)
- Attack type: Shooting; attempted murder-suicide
- Weapon: Smith & Wesson SD9VE semi-automatic pistol
- Deaths: 1 (the perpetrator)
- Injuries: 4 (3 by gunfire)
- Perpetrator: Nasim Najafi Aghdam
- Motive: Retaliation for YouTube channel demonetization

On April 3, 2018, at approximately 12:46 p.m. PDT, a shooting occurred at the headquarters of the American video-sharing website YouTube in San Bruno, California. The shooter was identified as 38-year-old Nasim Najafi Aghdam, who entered through an exterior parking garage, approached an outdoor patio, and opened fire with a Smith & Wesson 9 mm semi-automatic pistol. Aghdam wounded three people, one of them critically, before killing herself with her own firearm.

== Shooting ==
At 12:46 p.m., San Bruno police received reports of a shooter at the YouTube headquarters. Aghdam's weapon had a capacity of 10 rounds and she emptied one magazine before reloading. Helicopter footage later showed a large hole and broken glass in the building's lobby doors. A coroner's report found that Aghdam died of a self-inflicted gunshot to the heart, finding no evidence of drugs or alcohol in her system. Twenty ejected shell casings were found at the scene, and one unfired round was left in the gun.

== Perpetrator ==
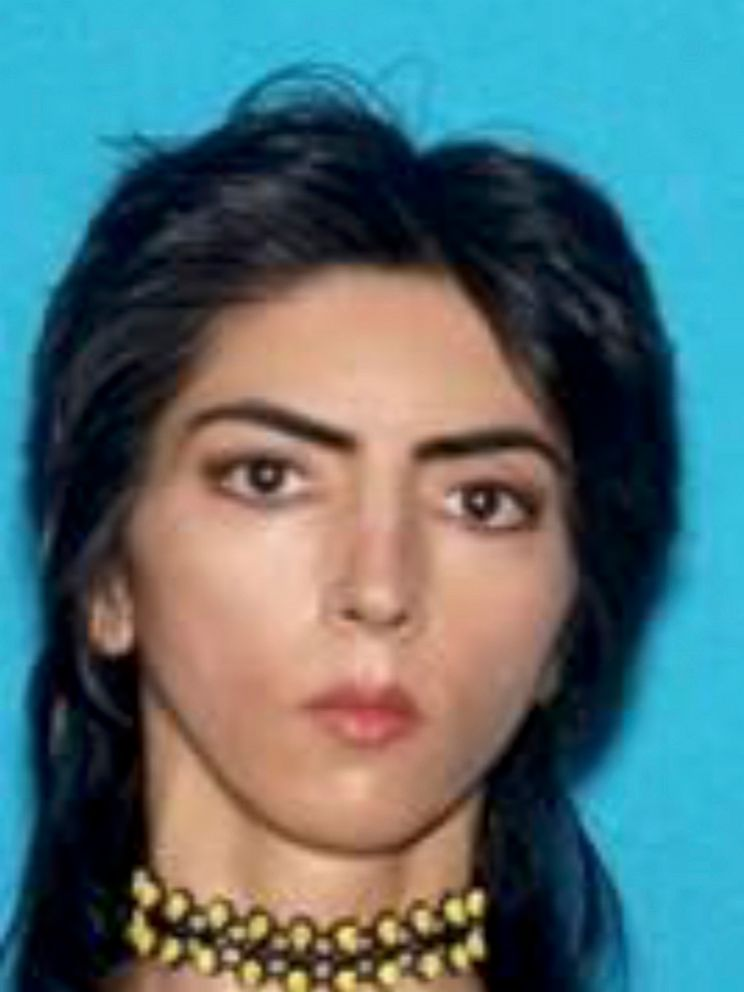
Nasim Najafi Aghdam

The perpetrator was identified by police as Nasim Najafi Aghdam (Persian: نسيم نجفى اقدم; April 5, 1979 – April 3, 2018), a vegan activist and fitness personality of Iranian-Azerbaijani heritage. Aghdam committed the shooting two days before her birthday. Aghdam was born in Urmia, Iran; her parents immigrated to Iran from the Republic of Azerbaijan. Aghdam immigrated to the United States with her family in 1996. Aghdam was a registered member of the Baháʼí Faith and described how veganism aligned with her religion. Aghdam was critical of Muslims and Baháʼís who ate meat. Aghdam lived with her grandmother in Riverside County, California, and posted content on Facebook, Instagram, Telegram, and YouTube in Persian, Azerbaijani, English, and Turkish. Adgham's content went viral on Iranian social media and drew widespread attention. Agdham protested with People for the Ethical Treatment of Animals (PETA) against the use of pigs in United States Marine Corps' training procedures for victims of trauma.

== Preparation ==
Aghdam purchased and registered a 9 mm Smith & Wesson semi-automatic pistol from The Gun Range San Diego, a gun dealer, on January 16, 2018. On March 31, 2018, Aghdam's family reported to the police that she was missing. According to her father, she hated YouTube, and the family was worried she might be traveling to the company's offices.

The morning before the shooting, police officers found Aghdam sleeping in her car in a Walmart parking lot in Mountain View, 23 miles (37 km) south of YouTube's headquarters. The officers did not identify her as a threat, and it is unclear whether they were aware of the concerns of Aghdam's father. Aghdam visited a shooting range the day before the shooting.

== Motive ==
Police believe Aghdam was motivated by perceived discrimination by YouTube towards her channels. She complained about the company on her website, writing that "Youtube filtered my channels to keep them from getting views!" and that the company had demonetized most of her videos.

Her father Ismail, of Riverside County, said that his daughter was a "vegan activist and animal lover" who told him YouTube had been censoring her videos and stopped paying her for her content. "She was angry," he said. According to The Mercury News, her YouTube channel included strange workout video clips, comedy sketches, bizarre homemade music videos, graphic anti-animal abuse videos, and vegan cooking tutorials.

== Victims ==
San Francisco General Hospital and Stanford University Medical Center treated four victims: a 36-year-old man in critical condition, a 32-year-old woman in serious condition, a 27-year-old woman in fair condition, and one woman who injured her ankle while fleeing.

== Reactions ==
U.S. President Donald Trump tweeted, "Our thoughts and prayers are with everybody involved. Thank you to our phenomenal law enforcement officers and first responders that are currently on the scene." Other politicians who extended condolences included Vice President Mike Pence, Minority Leader of the United States House of Representatives Nancy Pelosi, and California U.S. senator Dianne Feinstein.

YouTube CEO Susan Wojcicki wrote on Twitter: "There are no words to describe how horrible it was to have an active shooter @YouTube today. Our deepest gratitude to law enforcement & first responders for their rapid response. Our hearts go out to all those injured & impacted today. We will come together to heal as a family." Google CEO Sundar Pichai echoed his sentiments on Twitter, and sent an email to his employees describing the shooting as an "unimaginable tragedy" and a "horrific act of violence."

Tim Cook and Jeff Bezos, the CEOs of Apple and Amazon respectively, offered their condolences. Twitter CEO Jack Dorsey, Uber CEO Dara Khosrowshahi, and Box CEO Aaron Levie called for stricter gun control legislation. On Twitter, some right-wing accounts used the hashtag #CensorshipKills to blame the shooting on YouTube and portray Aghdam as a free speech martyr.

The Baháʼí National Center condemned the shooting and extended their condolences.

== See also ==
- 2025 Midtown Manhattan shooting
