= The Jeselnik Offensive =

American late-night television series

- Genre: Dark Humor; Black comedy
- Created by: Anthony Jeselnik; Tom Johnson
- Presented by: Anthony Jeselnik
- Starring: Anthony Jeselnik
- Theme music composer: Tim Mosher & Stoker
- Country of origin: United States
- Original language: English
- No. of seasons: 2
- No. of episodes: 18

Production
- Executive producers: Anthony Jeselnik; Christie Smith; Jim Sharp; Krysia Plonka; Monika Zielinska; Tom Johnson
- Running time: 22 minutes
- Production company: Mosaic Media Group

Original release
- Network: Comedy Central
- Release: February 19 – August 27, 2013

The Jeselnik Offensive is an American late-night television series that aired on Comedy Central. It was hosted by stand-up comedian Anthony Jeselnik, who extended his onstage character into weekly, topical humor with a sociopathic, dark twist. The show primarily consisted of a monologue and two panelists who joined Jeselnik in adding a humorous take on shocking, lurid news stories. The series premiered February 19, 2013, on Comedy Central and was renewed for a second season on April 26, 2013, and aired July 9, 2013. On November 11, 2013, Comedy Central cancelled The Jeselnik Offensive after two seasons, due to low ratings.

== Format ==
The Jeselnik Offensive has been described as combination of the late-night comedy series and a podcast. Each episode opens with a monologue from Jeselnik, which focuses on tragic news and dark humor. The following segment can sometimes be a comedic remote or an audience-participation game ("Which Kind of Asian Is This?"). Several recurring bits are used: "Sacred Cow" is a segment that takes a subject deemed off limits, and proceeds to make several jokes about it. Each segment uses its platform to tackle such "off-topic" topics as cancer, bullying and missing children through jokes. The following two segments feature guest panelists who continue the wicked take on news. The final segment, "Defend Your Tweet", in which Jeselnik digs up an old tweet by each of the panelists and confronts them with it. At the end of each show, Jeselnik looks back at faux "Best Moments" from the broadcast, and closes the show with his sign-off phrase, "Good night, kids, go read a book."

The series was live at Hollywood Center Studios in Los Angeles.

== History ==
In preparing the show, Comedy Central was looking for a half-hour, four-nights-a-week show following The Colbert Report titled Midnight. Jeselnik's main draw was the monologue, where he felt he could tell jokes that he was unable to do on Late Night with Jimmy Fallon, where he worked in 2009. For the pilot, Jeselnik did a test interview with a celebrity but felt "so wrong [...] it just fit me like a bad suit." For the show's first episode, Jeselnik performs cancer-related standup for a cancer support group. "I had to fight with Comedy Central to put that on the first episode", said Jeselnik. The network felt uneasy using the sketch as an introduction. Jeselnik pointed to the premiere episode of Chappelle's Show, in which Dave Chappelle plays a blind African-American Klansman, which he regarded as "one of the edgiest things they ever did." As such, the sketch opened the first episode and received a positive reception; Jay Leno called to inform Jeselnik how much he loved the cancer segment. Season 2 premiered July 9.

Jeselnik revealed in his Netflix Special "Thoughts and Prayers" that Comedy Central threatened to cancel the show after Jeselnik made a joke about the Boston Marathon bombing the day it happened on his Twitter account. After Jeselnik told Comedy Central he would not delete it (once they threatened to fire only him), they then informed him that they would simply cancel the show and fire everyone who worked on the show to which Jeselnik then deleted the joke citing "what I could not do, what I cannot do, is walk up to my cameraman and say, 'Hey, buddy, no work for you on Monday; I had this sweet Tweet.{{'"]]

== Episodes ==
=== Season 1 (2013) ===
| No. overall | No. in season | Panelists | Original release date | Prod. code | US viewers (millions) |
|---|---|---|---|---|---|
| 1 | 1 | Aziz Ansari and Amy Schumer | February 19, 2013 | 101 | 1.363 |
Monologue references: to Christopher Dorner's manhunt, Pope resignation, Catholic Church and HIV/AIDS, North Korea's threats of 2013, Storage Wars' Mark Balelo suicide, naming of park after Ku Klux Klan's founder, Detroit's Osama Bin Laden targets sale, Chris Brown's Porsche crash, Navy SEAL soldier unemployed. Segments: Who Wore It Better?, Sacred Cow (Cancer, with Christy A. Russell, M.D.), Panel, Show's Best Moments. During panel, there were additional segments, namely Best Worst Thing of The Week, Worst Worst Thing of The Week, The JonBenét Ramsey Memorial Parenting Segment, Latino Voices, Defending your Tweet.
| 2 | 2 | Nick Kroll and Patton Oswalt | February 26, 2013 | 102 | 1.26 |
Monologue references: ex-pornstar Scarlett Rouge charge with second degree murder, Adam Lanza tried to beat Anders Breivik murder record, Mindy Kaling's new show. Segments: Black Name Spelling Bee. Panel references: man was stabbed during a ménage à trois after he refused to change positions, Oscar Pistorius' alleged murder of Reeva Steenkamp and segments Not Buying It(about Four Loko) and Defending Your Tweet.
| 3 | 3 | Billy Eichner and Kristen Schaal | March 5, 2013 | 103 | N/A |
Monologue references: Hot Air Balloon crash - Egypt hot air balloon crash killing 19 people, Miss Teen Delaware porn video, Boston face transplant recipient, Mindy Kaling new show, 'One Million Moms' Wants Geico Pig Commercial Pulled, Carrie Fisher Bipolar episode, Man who claims to have $7500 of porn stolen, Joe Francis's Girls Gone Wild creator files for bankruptcy, Xavier Nunez who stabbed a classmate with a screwdriver, Bobby Brown convicted of DUI Segments: Sacred Cow (Missing Children, with private investigator Logan Clarke), Elderly Shaming, What's their problem? and Defending your Tweet. Panel references: Scott Lively proof that President Obama is Homosexual, Veteran Pornstar Ron Jeremy aneurism heart surgery, Abducted Alabama child, Elder abuse, Tiffany Ennis who Duct Taped Children's Faces and Sent Pictures To Dad, Daytona 500 Crash, Kara Vandereyk caught having sex with pit bull, man broke into a firehouse and masturbated on gear.
| 4 | 4 | Brian Posehn and Doug Benson | March 12, 2013 | 104 | 1.12 |
| 5 | 5 | Andy Kindler and Brett Gelman | March 19, 2013 | 105 | 1.266 |
| 6 | 6 | Jonah Ray and Jeff Ross | March 26, 2013 | 106 | 1.38 |
| 7 | 7 | John Mulaney and T. J. Miller | April 2, 2013 | 107 | 1.206 |
| 8 | 8 | Jason Mantzoukas and Natasha Leggero | April 9, 2013 | 108 | 1.29 |
| 9 | 9 | Abby Elliott and Pete Holmes | April 16, 2013 | 109 | 1.23 |
| 10 | 10 | Reggie Watts and Kumail Nanjiani | April 23, 2013 | 110 | 0.88 |

=== Season 2 (2013) ===
| No. overall | No. in season | Panelists | Original release date | Prod. code | US viewers (millions) |
|---|---|---|---|---|---|
| 11 | 1 | Jim Norton and Amy Schumer | July 9, 2013 | 201 | 0.655 |
| 12 | 2 | David Koechner and Kumail Nanjiani | July 16, 2013 | 202 | 0.551 |
| 13 | 3 | Adam Pally and Casey Wilson | July 23, 2013 | 203 | 0.765 |
| 14 | 4 | Doug Benson and Rob Huebel | July 30, 2013 | 204 | 0.600 |
| 15 | 5 | Dave Attell and Joan Rivers | August 6, 2013 | 205 | 0.572 |
| 16 | 6 | T.J. Miller and Eric André | August 13, 2013 | 206 | 0.846 |
| 17 | 7 | Thomas Lennon and Marc Maron | August 20, 2013 | 207 | 0.64 |
| 18 | 8 | Nick Kroll and John Mulaney | August 27, 2013 | 208 | 0.613 |

== Reception ==
The series received positive reviews. Kevin McFarland of The A.V. Club wrote, "The Jeselnik Offensive is one of the best [Comedy Central shows]. It's a highly intriguing and reliably funny take on the late-night format," adding, "Jeselnik and his writers prove that the key to making jokes about touchy subjects is actually being funny instead of simply trying to be edgy."

== See also ==
- List of programs broadcast by Comedy Central
