= Nice Try, The Devil =

Studio album by Pete Holmes
- Released: May 14, 2013
- Recorded: The Moody Theatre, 2013
- Genre: Comedy
- Length: 57:45
- Label: Comedy Central Records

Pete Holmes chronology
Impregnated With Wonder (2011)	Nice Try, The Devil (2013)

Nice Try, The Devil is the second album by comedian Pete Holmes. The stand-up TV special was directed by Marcus Raboy and premiered on Comedy Central on May 12, 2013. The album was released digitally on May 14, 2013, by Comedy Central Records.

== Track listing ==
No.	Title	Length
1.	"No Need Teef / Salon Dijon"	3:35
2.	"White Wine / Youth Pastor"	1:19
3.	"Pierce!!! / Juan!!!"	2:35
4.	"Good Time McDonald's"	2:16
5.	"Atlanta"	4:05
6.	"Dropped a Dog"	4:53
7.	"Single Give & Take"	4:18
8.	"Gay for Gosling"	4:40
9.	"Hate Girlfriend's Friends"	2:38
10.	"Video Game Doctor"	3:26
11.	"Breast Milk"	2:09
12.	"Arrows"	4:42
13.	"Belief Choices / Raptures"	7:09
14.	"Tighten Up"	2:11
15.	"Boysenberries / Cake Porn"	3:44
16.	"Telemarketers"	4:11

== Reception ==
Nice Try, The Devil was met with positive reviews. The A.V. Club named it the 6th-best comedy album of 2013, saying that it "builds on what Holmes established with his great 2011 album, Impregnated With Wonder, [where] folks would kill for the kind of guffaws Nice Try, The Devil produces". Paste ranked it as the 10th-best stand-up special of 2013, saying that it "shows off Pete Holmes’ comedic voice hilariously, loudly and undeniably". Consequence of Sound said that it "is a haphazard rodeo molded in the mind of a charismatic optimist [...] There are plenty of laughs, plus a nice dose of weirdness, if you're into that sort of thing".
