= Shakespeare (album) =

Live album by Anthony Jeselnik
- Released: September 21, 2010
- Recorded: May 2010
- Venue: UCB Theatre, New York City
- Genre: Comedy
- Length: 48:40
- Label: Comedy Central Records
- Producer: Jack Vaughn Jr.

Anthony Jeselnik chronology
Shakespeare (2010)	Caligula (2013)

Shakespeare is the debut album by comedian Anthony Jeselnik released digitally on September 21, 2010 by Comedy Central Records.

== Track listing ==
No.	Title	Length
1.	"Pleased to Meet You"	2:54
2.	"Standards and Practices"	4:02
3.	"School Sucks"	4:34
4.	"Bad Parents"	3:06
5.	"Fun Family"	2:30
6.	"Romance"	2:49
7.	"Seduction"	5:02
8.	"Odd Jobs"	4:34
9.	"Sacrilege"	3:17
10.	"Bad, Bad Things"	5:47
11.	"Can't Make Fun"	1:35
12.	"Baby Go Bye Bye"	5:30
13.	"Shakespeare"	2:59

=== Bonus track ===
No.	Title	Length
1.	"Ninja"	4:59

A bonus track released separately and used to help promote the album. It features Anthony berating an audience member who interrupted his set by shouting, "Ninja".

== Reception ==
Shakespeare was met with extremely positive reviews. Napster claimed "[His] outstanding writing and shameless self-promotion bordering on cult of personality are a winning combination. One of the best comedy albums of the season." Punchline Magazine's Brendan McLaughlin praised the album stating, "Anthony Jeselnik writes great jokes—plain and simple. He’s a master of the one-two punch. Now, he’s not the only game in town when it comes to slinging one liners, but he’s one of the best, and here’s why: Jeselnik’s stand-up embodies one of the most distinct, specific, unflinching comic personas on the scene today." The same publication then even chose it as its comedy album of the year. Saying, "Despite his relatively young age (he’s 31 as of this writing), Jeselnik is one of the best joke writers in comedy. His album Shakespeare is that confirmation. From start to finish, he delivers pristine, precise and economical bits with the polish of a 20-year stand-up veteran. There was a lot of solid comedy released this year; but no other album gave us as rich an experience as Shakespeare.

== Chart positions ==
Chart (2010)	Peak position
U.S. Billboard Comedy Albums	2
