= Fire in the Maternity Ward =

2019 Netflix stand-up comedy special

- Written by: Anthony Jeselnik
- Directed by: Marcus Raboy
- Starring: Anthony Jeselnik
- Country of origin: United States
- Original language: English

Production
- Running time: 64 minutes

Original release
- Network: Netflix
- Release: April 30, 2019

Fire in the Maternity Ward is a 2019 Netflix stand-up comedy special by American comic Anthony Jeselnik, his second Netflix stand-up special after Anthony Jeselnik: Thoughts and Prayers. In Fire in the Maternity Ward, directed by Shannon Hartman in New York City, Anthony Jeselnik talks about his grandmother's dementia, dropping babies and more.

== Release ==
Anthony Jeselnik: Fire in the Maternity Ward was released on April 30, 2019 on Netflix streaming.
