= Matt McCarthy (comedian) =

American comedian and actor

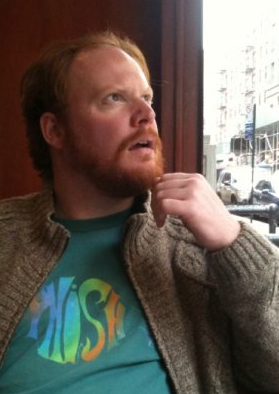
- Born: November 9, 1979 (age 47); Providence, Rhode Island, U.S.

Comedy career
- Years active: 2003–present
- Medium: Comedy, movie, television
- Genre: Comedy
- Website: themattmccarthy.com

Matt McCarthy (born November 9, 1979) is an American comedian, actor, writer, and improviser living in Los Angeles. He is best known for appearances on Conan, The Pete Holmes Show and CollegeHumor.com and as host of the We Watch Wrestling Podcast. McCarthy co-starred as Carl on the CBS show How We Roll.

== Early life ==
Matthew McCarthy, the youngest of three, was born in Providence, Rhode Island, at the old Women & Infants Hospital on Maude Street. He grew up in an Irish-Catholic home in Rumford, Rhode Island, and attended St. Margaret's School and La Salle Academy.

== Career ==
Described by The New York Times as a "John Belushi-like madman", McCarthy began performing standup comedy after graduating from Fordham University where he was the mascot, The Ram, from 1999 to 2001. He then studied improvisation at the Upright Citizens Brigade Theater in New York. Before becoming a performer, he appeared as a contestant on an episode of Cash Cab, which aired on June 26, 2006.

In 2008, he starred in a St. Patrick's Day commercial for Guinness. The next year he portrayed The Cable Guy in a series of Verizon FiOs commercials.

McCarthy co-founded the sketch video group Front Page Films with fellow comedians and creators, including frequent collaborator Pete Holmes. FPF made sketches, commercials and viral videos for Doritos, Crunch Fitness, CollegeHumor, and Comedy Central. McCarthy also starred in many shorts for CollegeHumor. Numerous Front Page Film videos were featured on Atom.com and Comedy Central's Tosh.0.

In 2010, McCarthy hosted Action Pack on AMC with Nick Stevens.

An avid pro wrestling fan, from 2011 to 2012 and 2016-2018 McCarthy worked as a creative writer for the WWE. In 2013, McCarthy began recording episodes of the We Watch Wrestling Podcast with fellow stand-up comedians Vince Averill and Tom Sibley and producer Rob Sibley.

From October 2013 through June 2014, McCarthy was a series regular and writer on The Pete Holmes Show on TBS following Conan.

== Stand-up comedy ==
McCarthy began performing comedy in New York City in 2003 at various open mics, barker shows, and bringer shows. He quickly found a home in the East Village at the now-defunct Comedy Social, with a weekly comedy showcase at Sin Sin bar. Soon after, McCarthy hosted a stand-up at Mo Pitkin's House of Satisfaction. McCarthy had a month-long run of his solo show "McCarthyism" at the infamous Rififi Cinema Classics. McCarthy also ran "The Matt McCarthy Stand-Up Comedy Show" at Comix NY for several months.

In 2011, McCarthy ran a monthly comedy extravaganza called MARKING OUT in Manhattan.

His standup comedy television performances include season 3 of Live at Gotham, John Oliver's New York Stand Up Show' on Comedy Central.

McCarthy has performed at such festivals as Just for Laughs in Montreal, All Tomorrow's Parties, Sasquatch! Music Festival, Outside Lands Music and Arts Festival and Bonnaroo.

He was named one of LA Weekly's Comics to Watch in 2014.

== Filmography ==
=== Film ===
Year	Title	Role	Notes
2010	The Other Guys	Therapy Cop #2	
2011	The Music Never Stopped	Carl	
2012	The Normals	Ossap	
2013	All That I Am	Pat	
2016	The Angry Birds Movie	Rodney Pig / Acrobat Pig	
2025	Companion	Sid	

=== Television ===
Year	Title	Role	Notes
2008	Live at Gotham	Himself	Episode #3.5
2010	John Oliver's New York Stand-Up Show	Himself	Episode: "Hannibal Buress, Pete Holmes, Matt McCarthy, & Janeane Garofalo"
2011	Bored to Death	Tiger	Episode: "We Could Sing A Duet"
2011	Curb Your Enthusiasm	Baseball Heckler	Episode: "Mister Softee"
2011	The Whitest Kids U' Know	Union Soldier	Episode: "Civil War on Drugs: part 8 & 9"
2012	Louie	Actor Louie	Episode: "Dad"
2012	White Collar	Mr. Cooper	Episode: "Upper West Side Story"
2013	Adam Devine's House Party	Bowling Team Buddy	Episode: "Neighbor Party"
2013–2014	The Pete Holmes Show	Series regular	Also writer
2015	@midnight	Himself	Episode 223
2015	Brooklyn Nine-Nine	Arman	Episode: "Payback"
2015–2017	Adam Ruins Everything	Striking Union Man / Joe 'Cray Cray' Crazyzowitz	4 episodes
2015–2021	Conan	Sketch performer	Recurring
2016	Bad Internet	John Snow	Youtube Red
2018–2020	Corporate	Richard	4 episodes
2019	Black Monday	Flanny	Episode: "Money Pot"
2022	How We Roll	Carl	11 episodes

== Discography ==
- Come Clean (2010)
- Pro Wrestling Fan (2016)
- Sober Dad (2020)
