= Impregnated with Wonder =

Impregnated With Wonder

Studio album by Pete Holmes
- Released: November 8, 2011
- Recorded: Punch Line San Francisco, 2011
- Genre: Comedy
- Length: 54:47
- Label: Comedy Central Records
- Producer: Jack Vaughn Jr.

Pete Holmes chronology
Impregnated With Wonder (2011)	Nice Try, The Devil (2013)

Impregnated With Wonder is the debut album by comedian Pete Holmes released digitally on November 8, 2011, by Comedy Central Records.

== Track listing ==
No.	Title	Length
1.	"Laughing Alone"	3:25
2.	"Killer In The Backseat"	4:26
3.	"YouTube Comments"	3:54
4.	"KKC / Sven Diagram"	1:50
5.	"Facebookery"	4:12
6.	"Magic Sound"	5:02
7.	"Fun Dad / Blonde Moustaches"	2:50
8.	"The King / Standing Like A Pregnant Woman"	5:08
9.	"Non-Fiction"	1:01
10.	"Sex In My Dreams"	3:17
11.	"Pieeeeeeeece!"	2:42
12.	"Google and Not Knowing"	2:49
13.	"Really? / "Must Be Free""	4:03
14.	"Subway"	3:13
15.	"Kid Bit"	4:32
16.	"I Need A Lawyer!!!!!"	2:22

== Reception ==
Impregnated With Wonder was met with positive reviews upon its release. The A.V. Club named it the 5th-best album of 2011, saying: "Impregnated With Wonder has plenty of gratuitously silly moments, each highlighting Holmes' over-the-top sense of humor." LaughSpin said, "This album may very well be one of the most quotable comedy albums of 2011. The end result is the portrait of a comedian embracing a component of comedy that may seem obvious in having fun." The Laugh Button reviewed the album by stating: "From the moment Impregnated With Wonder begins and without even having a visual, you can tell Holmes is all smiles, with his cherub-like "fat Val Kilmer" looks. It's a must-own record for anyone serious about comedy."
