= You Made It Weird with Pete Holmes =

Comedy podcast

You Made It Weird
- Genre: Comedy, entertainment, spirituality
- Language: English

Cast and voices
- Hosted by: Pete Holmes

Production
- Length: About 2 hours

Technical specifications
- Audio format: mp3

Publication
- No. of episodes: 721 (as of August 11, 2022)
- Original release: October 25, 2011
- Updates: Weekly

Related
- Website: https://youmadeitweird.libsyn.com

You Made It Weird is a weekly comedy interview podcast, hosted by Pete Holmes. It was hosted on the Nerdist network since October 25, 2011; however, as of August 2022, it is independently distributed. The show originated under the premise that Holmes would ask his guest, usually a fellow comedian, about three "weird" things he knew about them, but the show has since evolved into a much more loose conversation about topics such as comedy, religion, and sexuality.

== History ==
While initially focusing on interviews with comedians, an increasing number of guests from other fields have appeared on the show, including musicians, pastors, scientists, and authors. Katie Levine is the producer of the podcast.

The show is usually recorded in-studio at the Nerdist studio at Meltdown Comics in Los Angeles, California. Since March 21, 2012, Holmes has recorded multiple live episodes of the podcast, including in Austin at South by Southwest, New York, Bloomington, Chicago, Montreal, Quebec, San Francisco, Los Angeles at the LA Riot Festival, and Toronto at Just For Laughs. These have featured several guests rather than the usual one, and focus more on comedy rather than the in-depth discussion of a regular episode.

In August 2020, a spin-off version of the show entitled We Made It Weird aired its first episode. The show is much like the original in its format and topics covered; however, unlike the celebrity guests that make up episodes of You Made It Weird, We Made it Weird consists solely of Holmes and his wife, Valerie, on every episode. The show has been described by Holmes as a weekly catch-up between the two, and it airs on Fridays.

== Notable guests ==
In a 2013 A.V. Club interview, Holmes listed his favorite guests as Emily Gordon and Bert Kreischer. Harris Wittels described his long battle with addiction and his newfound sobriety just months before his death in February 2015.

Notable guests have included Marvel star Chris Evans, astrophysicist Neil deGrasse Tyson, and comedy actress Maya Rudolph.
