= Pete Holmes =

American comedian

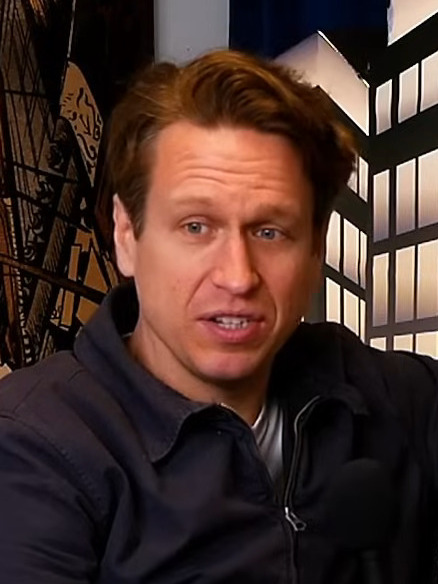
- Holmes in 2024
- Born: Peter Benedict Holmes; March 30, 1979 (age 47); Boston, Massachusetts, U.S.
- Spouse: Valerie Chaney (m. 2017)
- Children: 1

Comedy career
- Years active: 2001–present
- Medium: Stand-up, television, film, podcast
- Genres: Improvisational comedy; observational comedy; sketch comedy; blue comedy; surreal humor; sarcasm; satire
- Website: PeteHolmes.com

Peter Benedict Holmes (born March 30, 1979) is an American stand-up comedian, actor, writer, producer, and podcaster.

Holmes gained recognition in the early 2010s as a stand-up comic, during which he launched his podcast You Made It Weird (2011–present), released his first comedy special, and worked as an actor and television writer. Subsequently, he began his own late-night talk show The Pete Holmes Show (2013–2014), which ran on TBS for two seasons in the time-slot after Conan, a frequent champion of his work. He has released six comedy specials: Impregnated with Wonder (2011), Nice Try, The Devil (2013), Faces and Sounds (2016), Dirty Clean (2018), I Am Not For Everyone (2023), and Silly Silly Fun Boy (2026).

Holmes created and starred in the semi-autobiographical scripted comedy series Crashing, which aired on HBO for three seasons (2017–2019). He has worked as a voice actor and starred in the 2022 CBS sitcom How We Roll.

== Early life ==
Peter Benedict Holmes was born in Boston on March 30, 1979. His mother is a Lithuanian refugee, while his father is American with Irish ancestry. He has a brother who composes music under the name Dr. Holmes. He grew up in Lexington, Massachusetts, where he graduated from Lexington High School before attending Gordon College in Wenham, Massachusetts, where he graduated with a degree in English and Communications in 2001. During this time, he played in a punk rock band and participated in an improvisational comedy troupe called The Sweaty-Toothed Madmen.

Partly at the behest of his mother, Holmes had plans to become a youth pastor. This gave way to public speaking, and his love for comedy won over his need to preach. Finding little success as a comedian in his home state, he lived in Sleepy Hollow, New York, then moved to Chicago and then Los Angeles.

== Career ==
=== 2001–2009: Early career ===
Holmes began his comedy career in New York City. In the mid-2000s, he was making club appearances and took part in Comedy Central's Premium Blend, as a regular panelist on VH1's Best Week Ever, and on VH1's All Access. He began working as a touring comic, including on the Christian comedy circuit. Since 2006, his cartoons have appeared in The New Yorker.

Holmes also created and appeared in a Super Bowl XLIII ad for Doritos in 2009 featuring a fictional new beer flavor of the product, in which each chip contains as much alcohol as a 16 o.z. can of beer.

=== 2010–2013: Breakthrough ===
==== Stand-up and You Made It Weird with Pete Holmes ====
In 2010, he performed on John Oliver's New York Stand Up Show as well as Late Night with Jimmy Fallon. On February 26, 2010, he performed his first television special on the series Comedy Central Presents. On March 21, 2011, and on November 17, 2011, he appeared on the TBS talk show Conan.

Holmes released his first album, Impregnated With Wonder, on iTunes on November 15, 2011. In 2013, he released his second album, Nice Try, The Devil.

In 2011, Holmes launched his long-form comedy podcast You Made It Weird with Pete Holmes. It has featured guests such as Garry Shandling, Judd Apatow, Aziz Ansari, John Mulaney, Ben Schwartz, and Dana Carvey. Topics typically discussed in each episode are the guests' views on comedy, sexuality, and religion.

==== Television and The Pete Holmes Show ====
Holmes has provided the voices for several of the characters on Comedy Central's cartoon Ugly Americans. He was the voice of the E-Trade baby on several television commercials and was credited as a writer for those commercials.

He wrote for the NBC primetime sitcom Outsourced and for the Fox sitcom I Hate My Teenage Daughter.

Holmes has created a comedic portrayal of Batman in CollegeHumor's internet series Badman. He ran a YouTube channel which was focused around skits alongside Matthew McCarthy called frontpagefilms.

On August 21 and 23 in 2012, Holmes recorded three episodes of a talk show pilot for TBS, produced by Conan O'Brien, entitled The Midnight Show with Pete Holmes. Holmes's guests on the unaired pilots included Nick Offerman, Joel McHale, T.J. Miller, and Bill Burr. On February 26, 2013, TBS picked up the show and began airing in late 2013. By July 10, 2013, the name of the show was The Pete Holmes Show. The series premiered on October 28, after Conan.

The show was picked up for a second season by TBS. On December 9, 2013, Gabe Liedman performed the show's first stand-up routine. On May 23, 2014, TBS canceled the talk show after two seasons following poor audience ratings. The show ended its run on June 19, 2014.

=== 2014–present: Crashing and new projects ===
Holmes released his third comedy special, Faces and Sounds, in 2016. In 2019, he released his fourth album, Dirty Clean.

Holmes created and starred in the TV series Crashing, a semi-autobiographical show which aired on HBO. It revolves around Holmes' character Pete, a young comedian who pursues a career in stand-up comedy after his wife cheats on him, leaving him homeless. Holmes successfully pitched the idea of the show to Judd Apatow and it was picked up by HBO for filming in September 2015, with Apatow as director. The success of the pilot led HBO to give the green-light to the first season in January 2016. After four episodes had aired, HBO renewed the series for a second season which premiered on January 14, 2018. On February 21, 2018, HBO renewed the series for a third season. HBO canceled Crashing in March 2019.

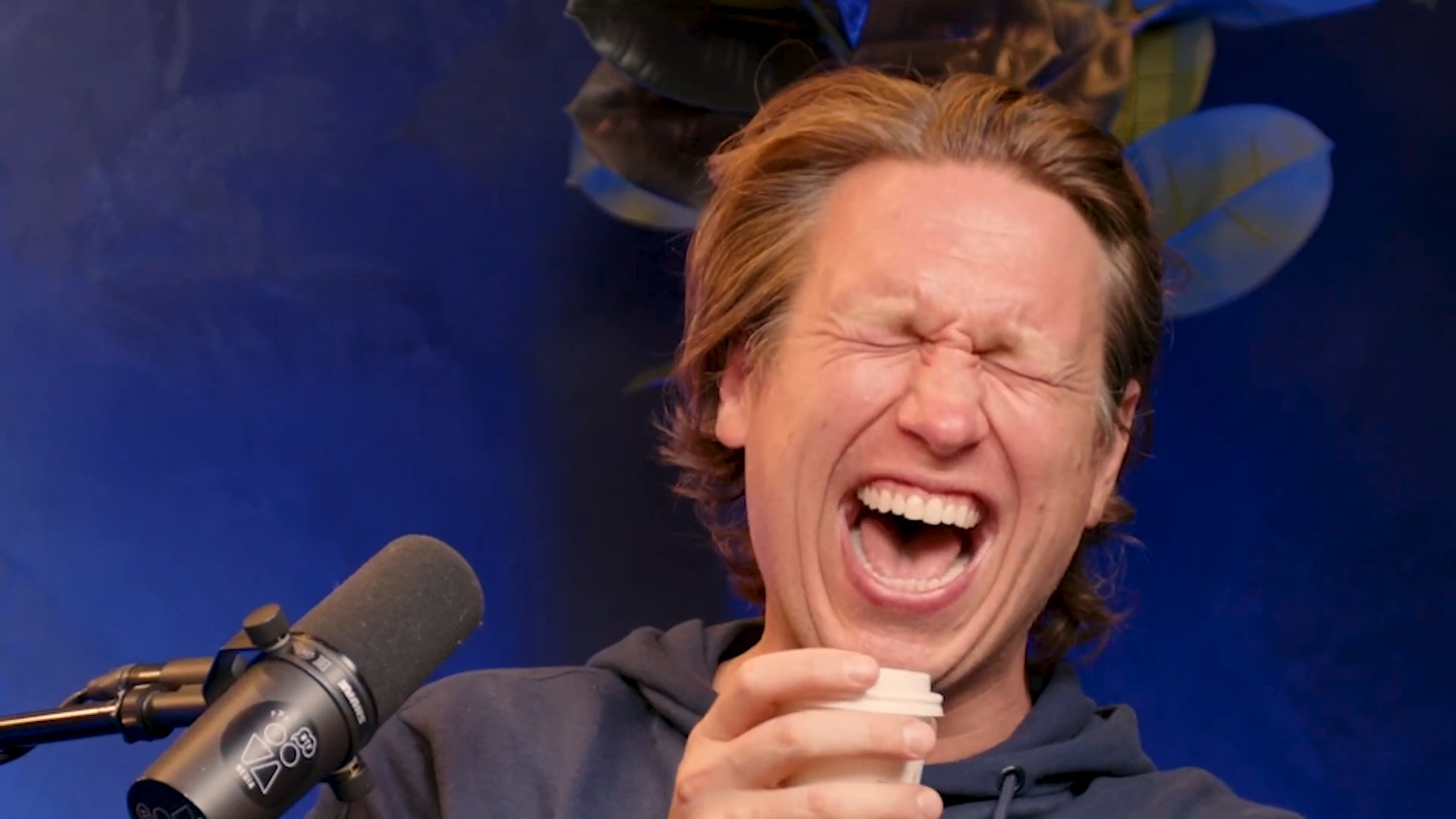
Holmes in 2023

On May 14, 2019, Holmes released his book Comedy Sex God, which is described as "part autobiography, part philosophical inquiry, and part spiritual quest".

On March 29, 2021, Holmes was selected to play the lead role of a laid-off auto worker-turned-professional bowler (based on the life of Tom Smallwood) in a CBS sitcom pilot. On May 14, 2021, the pilot for Smallwood was ordered to series, with a mid-season debut planned for the 2021–22 television season. On November 24, CBS announced the sitcom had been retitled How We Roll, and received an adjusted first-season order of 11 episodes. On December 10, 2021, CBS announced the series would premiere on March 31, 2022. On May 12, 2022, CBS announced the show had been canceled after one season.

== Influences ==
Holmes has listed "Weird Al" Yankovic, Brian Regan, Sinbad, Steve Martin, Conan O'Brien, Jerry Seinfeld, Chris Farley, Dane Cook, and Ray Romano as his biggest comedic influences.

== Personal life ==
Holmes married his college girlfriend, whose identity he has not disclosed, at the age of 22; they divorced six years later after he discovered that she was cheating on him, which later inspired his semi-autobiographical sitcom Crashing (2017–2019). He married Valerie Chaney in late 2017. Their daughter was born in September 2018.

Holmes is a vegan. He originally planned to become a youth pastor, and now jokingly refers to himself as "Christ-leaning" and a "hooraytheist".

== Filmography ==
=== Comedy specials ===
Year	Title	Role	Notes
2011	Impregnated with Wonder	Himself	
2013	Nice Try, The Devil	Himself	
2016	Faces and Sounds	Himself	
2018	Dirty Clean	Himself	
2023	I Am Not for Everyone	Himself	
2026	Silly Silly Fun Boy	Himself	

=== Film ===
Year	Title	Role	Notes
2014	I Am Road Comic	Himself	
2016	Don't Think Twice	Pete Holmes	
2019	The Secret Life of Pets 2	Chuck	Voice role
2020	Gutbuster	Himself	
2021	Home Sweet Home Alone	Uncle Blake	
2023	Family Switch	Peter	
2023	Woman of the Hour	Terry	
2024	The Best Christmas Pageant Ever	Bob Bradley	
TBA	(Saint) Peter	Buck Blanes	Post-production

=== Television ===
Year	Title	Role	Notes
2005	Premium Blend	Himself	Episode: "8.6"
2007	Scott Batman Presents Scott Batman Presents	Earth's New Robot Overlord (voice)	Episode: "One"
2010–2011	Outsourced		Writer
2010–2012	Ugly Americans	Toby (voice)	20 episodes
2010–2013	John Oliver's New York Stand-Up Show	Himself	3 episodes
2011	Pete Holmes: Impregnated With Wonder	Himself	Stand-up special
2011–2012	I Hate My Teenage Daughter		Writer
2013	The Jeselnik Offensive	Himself	Episode 1.9
2013	Maron	Himself	Episode: "Marc's Dad"
2013	Pete Holmes: Nice Try, the Devil	Himself	Stand-up special
2013	American Dad!	Toby (voice) / Millionaire Matt Davis (voice)	Episode: "Lost in Space" "The Longest Distance Relationship"
2013–2014	The Pete Holmes Show	Himself (host)	Also creator, writer, and executive producer
2014	Mulaney	Trey	Episode: "In the Name of the Mother, and the Son, and the Holy Andre"
2016	Animals.	Patrick (voice)	Episode: "Rats."
2016	Pete Holmes: Faces and Sounds	Himself	Stand-up special
2016–17	Mighty Magiswords	Teri Gargantuan, Thaddeus Thirdwell III (voice)	4 episodes
2017	Penn Zero: Part-Time Hero	Ryan (voice)	Episode: "A Tale of Two Wizards"
2017–2019	Crashing	Pete	Also creator, writer, and executive producer
2018	Bob's Burgers	Connor (voice)	Episode: "Something Old, Something New, Something Bob Caters For You"
2018	Pete Holmes: Dirty Clean	Himself	Stand-up special
2018–2020	The Simpsons	Matthew / Bode Wright (voice)	Episodes: "Bart's Not Dead", "Warrin' Priests"; also writer
2019	Star Wars Resistance	Flobb / Fleez (voice)	Episode: "From Beneath"
2022	How We Roll	Tom Smallwood	Lead role
2023	Night Court	Rand	4 episodes
2024-2026	Make Some Noise	Himself	Episodes: "A Celebrity's Unflattering Wax Figure Reveal", "Pete, Lisa, and Paul Roast Sam A Lot"
2024	The Pradeeps of Pittsburgh	Dark Suit	8 Episodes
2025	Hollywood Squares	Himself	Episode: "S1 Ep2 - The Mayor of the Sun"
2025	Dancing with Sharks	Himself	Judge; Shark Week special

=== Web series ===
Year	Title	Role	Notes
2023	Star Trek: Very Short Treks	Capitain	Episode: "Skin A Cat"
