= How We Roll (TV series) =

2022 American sitcom television series

- Genre: Sitcom
- Created by: Mark Gross
- Starring: Pete Holmes; Chi McBride; Katie Lowes; Julie White; Mason Wells
- Composers: P.J. Hanke; Mark Mothersbaugh; Bob Mothersbaugh
- Country of origin: United States
- Original language: English
- No. of seasons: 1
- No. of episodes: 11

Production
- Executive producers: Mark Gross; Pete Holmes; David Hollander; Brian d'Arcy James
- Producers: Marina Dompke; Patricia Fass Palmer
- Editor: Patricia Barnett
- Camera setup: Multi-camera
- Running time: 22 minutes
- Production companies: Hi Mom Productions; Three Rivers Entertainment; Horicon Productions; CBS Studios

Original release
- Network: CBS
- Release: March 31 – May 19, 2022

How We Roll is an American biographical sitcom created by Mark Gross, that aired on CBS from March 31 to May 19, 2022. The series was inspired by the life of professional bowler Tom Smallwood. In May 2022, the series was canceled after one season.

== Premise ==
A 35-year old Midwestern husband and father gets laid off from his auto plant job, and makes the bold decision to provide for his family by following his dream of becoming a professional bowler.

== Cast and characters ==
=== Main ===
- Pete Holmes as a fictionalized version of Tom Smallwood, a laid-off auto worker turned professional bowler
- Chi McBride as Archie Betts, proprietor of Archie's Lanes and Tom's long-time friend/mentor
- Katie Lowes as Jen Smallwood, Tom's wife who works as a hair stylist
- Julie White as Helen Smallwood, Tom's mother, and Jen's mother-in-law
- Mason Wells as Sam Smallwood, Tom and Jen's son

=== Recurring ===
- Tahj Mowry as Lew, an employee at Archie's Lanes
- Rondi Reed as Ruth, a hair salon owner and Jen's boss
- Judy Kain as Mimi
- Amanda Perez as Tia, Jen's co-worker
- Matt McCarthy as Carl, a regular customer at Archie's Lanes

=== Notable guests ===
- French Stewart as Jacob Powell
- Sheryl Lee Ralph as Loretta

== Episodes ==
No.	Title	Directed by	Written by	Original release date	U.S. viewers (millions)
1	"Pilot"	Mark Cendrowski	Mark Gross	March 31, 2022	4.22
Two months after he was laid off just before Christmas, Tom is conflicted between another auto plant job his mother found for him or following his dream of joining the professional bowlers tour. He is encouraged by friend, coach and bowling alley owner Archie to choose the latter. Tom is later inspired by watching his son Sam pursue his passion for tap dancing, not caring what other boys think. His wife Jen is initially not on board, but comes around when she realizes she wants a happy husband more than anything else.
2	"The Sponsor"	Betsy Thomas	Michael Glouberman	April 7, 2022	2.98
Tom is encouraged by Lew to accept a real, paying sponsorship from a funeral home rather than honor the "friendly" sponsorship agreement he made with Archie. Ultimately, Tom realizes that Archie has already paid his sponsorship fee with years of free lane time and coaching. Meanwhile, Jen's boss will not allow her to give a younger customer a non-traditional hair color and style, so Jen decides to service the customer in her own home.
3	"The Hustle"	Betsy Thomas	Tommy Johnagin	April 14, 2022	3.98
With his first tournament still weeks away, Tom feels guilty that Jen is putting in extra hours at the salon to make ends meet, causing her to miss out on time with Sam. He tries a bowling hustle at Archie's suggestion and makes some extra cash, but later pays the guy back after realizing it sets a bad example for Sam. Tom then sells his prized baseball card collection so Jen can take a couple days off.
4	"The First Tournament"	Mark Cendrowski	Susan McMartin	April 21, 2022	3.99
As Tom leaves for his first pro tournament, Helen invites herself to help Jen with Sam. Helen later argues with Jen's boss over the way she's treating Jen, and gets her daughter-in-law fired. At the tournament, Tom has to overcome his opponents' mind games (in his own way), but ultimately makes the cash-cut line. He returns home with the good news and a check, only to learn the bad news that Jen is unemployed.
5	"The Laundry Basket"	Mark Cendrowski	Story by : Pete Holmes; Teleplay by : Mateo Gomez & Jacob Brown	April 28, 2022	3.32
When Tom finds Helen stuck in a laundry basket at her home and learns she's been there for hours, he suggests she move into his house, much to Jen's chagrin. Meanwhile, Jen is frustrated over looking for a new job, but soon learns that some of her salon clients are willing to get their hair done in her home.
6	"The Date"	Mark Cendrowski	Nicole Sun	April 28, 2022	3.17
When Tom and Jen suggest that Helen start dating again, she reluctantly agrees. Helen then mentions she has one guy in mind: none other than Archie, whom she claims asked her out a few years ago and she refused. She suggests a double-date with Tom and Jen might be an easier first step, but the date becomes awkward when Helen and Archie instantly take a shine to each other.
7	"The Power of Positive Thinking"	Mark Cendrowski	Hugh Moore	May 5, 2022	2.97
Tom has been cashing regularly in regional tournaments, but still hasn't met his goal of a top-ten finish, which would qualify him for the PBA World Series of Bowling. He partly blames Archie's coaching, insisting that he only emphasizes what Tom is doing wrong. Feeling that some positive encouragement would go a long way, Tom he gets Archie to listen to a favorite podcast. This backfires, as Archie's over-the-top compliments become annoying. Meanwhile, Tia quits Ruth's salon and wants to go into business with Jen. However, the two learn that a vengeful Ruth has sent an inspector to the Smallwood home, hoping to get their operation shut down before it starts.
8	"The Big Secret"	Mark Cendrowski	Janene Lin	May 12, 2022	3.68
Archie is down in the dumps and useless as a coach to Tom. Tom soon learns the reason: Helen ghosted Archie after what he thought was a nice date. Tom confronts his mother, who reveals she found out a secret about Archie: he's still legally married to his estranged wife.
9	"The Houseguest"	Betsy Thomas	Story by : Susan McMartin; Teleplay by : Zen Freese & Ben Lyerly	May 12, 2022	3.26
Tom is visited by Rick Rholla, "The Rock & Roll Bowla," whom he encountered during his first pro tournament. Rick relays how he messed up his marriage and became miserable after chasing the fame and glory that accompanies being a well-known sports celebrity. Tom then annoys Jen by inviting Rick to stay awhile in the Smallwood home. Despite Rick's warnings, Tom finds himself missing Sam's tap recital due to attending a ceremony at a restaurant that is naming a menu item after him.
10	"The PTQ"	Phill Lewis	Michael Glouberman	May 19, 2022	3.32
As Tom and Archie drive to a tournament in Milwaukee, the last pre-tournament qualifier (PTQ) for the World Series of Bowling, they find that Sam has stowed himself away in the truck. Jen later shows up to retrieve Sam, and Helen arrives to be with Archie. A chaotic situation ensues when all five have to spend the night in the same hotel room. Despite missing his practice time and getting very little sleep, Tom not only makes the World Series qualifying cut, he also wins first place in the tournament.
11	"The Big One"	Phill Lewis	Tommy Johnagin	May 19, 2022	3.06
While preparing Tom for the World Series of Bowling, Archie collapses and is taken to the hospital. It's revealed he had a cardiac event and needs surgery to have a stent put in. Tom does not want to leave Archie behind, and suggests skipping his first major tournament. Through Jen, Archie is able to convince Tom that he can't miss the chance to accomplish the goal they've worked so hard to achieve. After Tom and Jen leave, Helen and Archie profess their love for each other. While driving to the tournament, Jen tells Tom that she's pregnant with their second child. NOTE: In his very first PBA World Series of Bowling, the real Tom Smallwood won the PBA World Championship, a major title on the PBA Tour.

== Production ==
=== Development ===
On March 1, 2021, a sitcom titled The Tom Smallwood Project was given a pilot order with Mark Gross writing the pilot. In May 2021, the sitcom titled Smallwood was given a series order with Mark Cendrowski directing the pilot, and was scheduled for a mid-season premiere in the 2021–22 television season. On November 24, 2021, it was announced that the series title had been changed to How We Roll with an 11-episode count. On May 12, 2022, CBS canceled the series after one season.

=== Casting ===
On March 29, 2021, Pete Holmes was cast as the lead role for the pilot. In April 2021, Chi McBride and Katie Lowes were cast in main roles for the pilot. On November 1, 2021, Julie White was cast in a main role for the pilot. On December 10, 2021, Mason Wells was cast in a main role. On December 17, 2021, Tahj Mowry, Rondi Reed, Judy Kain, Amanda Perez and Matt McCarthy were cast in recurring roles.

=== Filming ===
How We Roll was filmed at Radford Studio Center in Studio City, California, but it is set in Saginaw, Michigan.

== Release ==
The series premiered on March 31, 2022 and ended on May 19, 2022.

== Reception ==
=== Critical response ===
On review aggregator website Rotten Tomatoes, the series holds a 67% approval rating based on six critic reviews, with an average rating of 6.8/10. On Metacritic, the series has a score of 57 out of 100, based on five critics, indicating "mixed or average reviews".

=== Ratings ===
Viewership and ratings per episode of How We Roll
No.	Title	Air date	Rating (18–49)	Viewers (millions)	DVR (18–49)	DVR viewers (millions)	Total (18–49)	Total viewers (millions)
1	"Pilot"	March 31, 2022	0.3	4.22	TBD	TBD	TBD	TBD
2	"The Sponsor"	April 7, 2022	0.3	2.98	TBD	TBD	TBD	TBD
3	"The Hustle"	April 14, 2022	0.4	3.98	TBD	TBD	TBD	TBD
4	"The First Tournament"	April 21, 2022	0.4	3.99	TBD	TBD	TBD	TBD
5	"The Laundry Basket"	April 28, 2022	0.4	3.33	TBD	TBD	TBD	TBD
6	"The Date"	April 28, 2022	0.3	3.17	TBD	TBD	TBD	TBD
7	"The Power of Positive Thinking"	May 5, 2022	0.3	2.97	TBD	TBD	TBD	TBD
8	"The Big Secret"	May 12, 2022	0.4	3.68	TBD	TBD	TBD	TBD
9	"The Houseguest"	May 12, 2022	0.3	3.26	TBD	TBD	TBD	TBD
10	"The PTQ"	May 19, 2022	0.3	3.32	TBD	TBD	TBD	TBD
11	"The Big One"	May 19, 2022	0.3	3.06	TBD	TBD	TBD	TBD
