= Joe DeRosa (comedian) =

American comedian

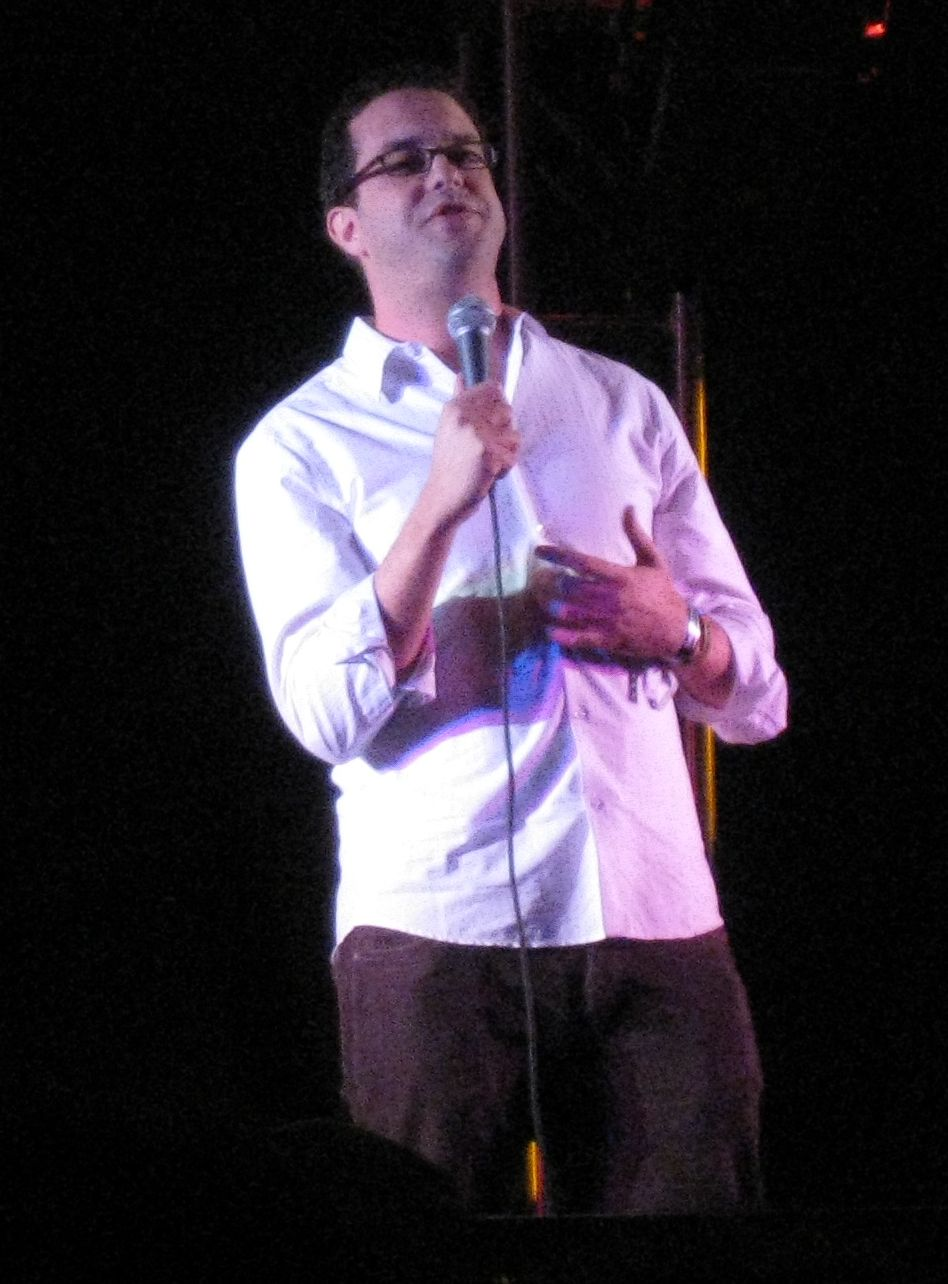
- DeRosa in 2008
- Born: August 6, 1977 (age 49); Collegeville, Pennsylvania, United States

Comedy career
- Medium: Stand-up, acting, podcasts
- Website: joederosa.com

Joe DeRosa (born August 6, 1977) is an American stand-up comedian, actor, restaurateur, musician, and podcaster.

== Career ==
=== Stand-up comedy, radio, television and film ===
DeRosa got his start in comedy performing as part of a comedic musical duo called Deep at the New Road Brewhouse in his hometown of Collegeville, Pennsylvania. After the duo split, DeRosa began performing stand-up comedy regularly at the Laff House in Philadelphia. DeRosa moved to New York City, performing regularly in comedy clubs. Beginning in 2006, DeRosa began co-hosting the Uninformed radio show with Bill Burr on Sirius Satellite Radio. The monthly show aired on Saturday nights. After new episodes began airing more sporadically, the show was dropped. It ran as a podcast for several more episodes before ending altogether in 2009.

In 2009, DeRosa starred in his first half-hour Comedy Central Presents special. On June 21, 2010, Comedy Central Records released DeRosa's first album The Depression Auction. DeRosa's second album, Return of the Son of Depression Auction, was released on September 6, 2011. That same year, DeRosa, Burr and Robert Kelly, co-wrote, co-produced and co-starred in a short film titled Cheat which DeRosa also directed.

In August 2012, a four-episode web short series titled Overrated debuted on the Official Comedy YouTube channel and featured DeRosa and Kurt Metzger discussing overrated and underrated pop culture subjects. In October 2012, a six-part web short series titled What Are We Waiting For?, which DeRosa wrote, directed and starred in, debuted on Warner Bros.' The Warner Sound website. The series featured DeRosa as an unnamed, obnoxiously overzealous music fan. Guest stars for the series include Bill Burr, Bonnie McFarlane, Gregg "Opie" Hughes, Anthony Cumia, Jim Norton, Carmine Famiglietti and Mike Robinson. In December 2012, a third web short series titled We Should Break Up starring DeRosa and fellow comedian and former girlfriend, Nikki Glaser, debuted on the Official Comedy channel on YouTube. The six-part series featured DeRosa and Glaser as an on again, off again couple in situations based on actual events that happened during their time as a real-life couple. Besides co-writing and co-starring in the shorts, DeRosa also directed the series.

DeRosa's third album, You Will Die, was released on September 3, 2013. In October 2013, DeRosa relocated from New York City to Los Angeles to take a job as a writer on The Pete Holmes Show which aired from October 28, 2013, through June 18, 2014. DeRosa has also made appearances on comedy series such as Louie, Bored to Death, Inside Amy Schumer and Sullivan & Son. Also in 2013, DeRosa voiced a character named Rufus Bellows in the video game, Grand Theft Auto V and starred in his second half-hour Comedy Central special.

DeRosa's fourth album, Mistakes Were Made: The B Sides, was released on September 2, 2014. In October 2014, DeRosa joined the writing team for the Netflix original series, Wet Hot American Summer: First Day of Camp, a prequel to the film Wet Hot American Summer. 2014 was also the release date for the Bonnie McFarlane film, Women Aren't Funny which DeRosa served as a writer on. In 2015, DeRosa first appeared as Dr. Caldera, a veterinarian with criminal ties, on the AMC television series, Better Call Saul. Caldera was a recurring character throughout the show's six seasons. On November 14, 2015, DeRosa performed at Madison Square Garden as an opening act for Bill Burr. On October 13, 2016, DeRosa taped his first one-hour special for Comedy Central at The Masonic Lodge at the Hollywood Forever Cemetery in Los Angeles, California. The special, titled You Let Me Down, debuted on February 3, 2017. A digital audio version, DeRosa's fifth album, was released four days later through outlets such as iTunes and Amazon. DeRosa was also the writer of one episode of Comedy Central's Jeff & Some Aliens during its first and only season. The episode, titled "Jeff & Some Confidence", aired on February 15, 2017. Beginning in 2017, DeRosa served as a writer and consultant on Pete Holmes' HBO television series, Crashing during its three-season run.

On February 26, 2018, DeRosa appeared as Gary on the debut episode of Living Biblically, a CBS sitcom created by Patrick Walsh and produced by Johnny Galecki. Additionally, DeRosa executive produced and also starred as The Nocturnal in the horror anthology series, By Night: Origins which became available to stream via Amazon Prime on April 13, 2018. DeRosa's sixth album, I Go To Atlanta All The Time was released on October 31, 2018, and aired exclusively on Sirius XM Satellite Radio's Raw Dog Comedy channel for approximately one year before being made available for purchase on November 15, 2019.

In May 2019, Comedy Central released three weekly shorts titled You Let Me Down. The series, written by and starring DeRosa, is based on his regular column published in Penthouse magazine throughout 2017 and 2018. In late 2019, DeRosa moved back to New York City and resumed working at New York comedy clubs on a full-time basis.

In November 2020, DeRosa partnered with The Stand Comedy Club in New York City to create the pop-up sandwich shop, Joey Roses. Located within the club itself, the eatery offered "neighborhood-style sandwiches." On November 21, 2021, DeRosa partnered with The Stand Comedy Club owner Paul Italia to open Joey Roses Sandwich Shoppe in its own location at 174 Rivington Street in New York City.

=== Podcasting ===
From July 2011 through March 2012, DeRosa was the co-host of fellow comedian Robert Kelly's podcast, You Know What Dude? on the Riotcast Network. In February 2014, he began hosting his own podcast, Down With Joe DeRosa, which the next year became part of Al Madrigal and Bill Burr's All Things Comedy podcast network. Soon after, DeRosa noted that he had grown tired of the podcast and its format. He ended the podcast in June 2015 but noted that a new podcast was already planned.

On July 10, 2015, Fangoria announced that DeRosa would co-host a new podcast with writer, Patrick Walsh. The podcast, We'll See You In Hell, has horror films as one of its topics and debuted on August 3, 2015. In 2017 it moved to the HeadGum podcast network due to changes occurring within Fangoria. The show made its return on HeadGum on March 6, 2017. It went on hiatus in May 2018, and returned in September as part of Starburns Audio, the podcast network division of Starburns Industries. The show took another extended hiatus in May 2019. The show resumed on September 2, although it was now no longer attached to any podcast network. It was instead exclusively available only to the show's Patreon subscribers with two episodes being released monthly. In August 2020, an additional tier was made available for subscribers to receive an additional two episodes each month, bringing the total amount of monthly shows to four. The show ended in August 2025, shortly after its ten-year anniversary.

On February 17, 2017, DeRosa debuted another podcast, Emotional Hangs, on Feral Audio. The show, co-hosted with fellow comedian, Kurt Braunohler, began as one of several rotating formats on Braunohler's Nerdist Industries podcast, The K Ohle with Kurt Braunohler before spinning off into its own show. The podcast took a humorous look at forming and maintaining adult male friendships. The podcast has been on hiatus since its December 13, 2017 episode. Initially, the hiatus was due to Braunohler's need to relocate to Montreal for several months but during that time, Feral Audio ceased operation, leaving Emotional Hangs without a network home and no episodes have been released since.

On November 4, 2018, DeRosa and Burr released the first two new episodes of the Uninformed podcast. Two episodes a month, released simultaneously, were made available exclusively to Burr's paid Patreon subscribers. In May 2019, after twelve episodes, it was announced that Burr would no longer be using the Patreon subscription model and that all future episodes, as well as existing ones, would be available for free. No further episodes have been released since August 2019.

Following DeRosa's return to living in New York City, he teamed with fellow New York comedian, Corinne Fisher, for the podcast Without a Country. The taping of the show became a weekly event at the Stand Comedy club as of January 7, 2020, and is released as a weekly podcast. On January 10, 2021, DeRosa announced his departure from Without a Country which would continue airing new episodes without him.

On December 1, 2020, Derosa and Sal Vulcano of Impractical Jokers debuted their podcast network, No Presh Network. The network debuted with two podcasts, Taste Buds featuring DeRosa and Vulcano and Hey Babe! featuring Vulcano and stand-up comedian, Chris Distefano. As of June 2024, both podcasts have gone on indefinite hiatus.

=== Musical projects ===
DeRosa and childhood friend James Pinkstone formed a comedic sex rap group called Deep. After releasing their debut album, The Game Plan, in 2005 and performing several live shows, the duo felt that people were taking the act too seriously and not understanding that their extreme misogyny was a parody of existing sex rap acts. As a result, the friends disbanded Deep. In 2007, DeRosa and his friend Paul Chell released an album titled Twointheoneinthe under the name Salsa Windfall. In 2009, DeRosa and Pinkstone reunited as an electropop act, named Funeral In The Mirror, to release an album titled Old Wolf Thoughts. In 2012, DeRosa teamed with fellow comedians Bob Place, Ben Evans, Michael Albanese and Jamey McDaniel for a comedy rap video reminiscent of Deep, titled "Grab Dat Dolla" which was released through Laughing Skull Studios' YouTube channel. In January 2016, DeRosa released a five-song digital EP under the name DemonRiot through the Bandcamp website. A second EP, titled Deformed Disco, was made available on the site one month later. Salsa Windfall released their second album, Artificial Birth, on August 1, 2023.

DeRosa has also composed and recorded the theme songs for four of his podcasts, Down With Joe DeRosa, We'll See You In Hell, Emotional Hangs, and Without A Country.

== Personal life ==
DeRosa is an Egyptian-American who was adopted by an Italian family. In 2007, he stated to Newsweek that he faced ignorant stereotypes as a kid, and that he bases his comedy bits around the comments of an uncle who kept implying that his biological family had oil-wells.

== Discography ==
Year	Album	Artist	Notes
2005	The Game Plan	Deep	Comedic musical project with James Pinkstone
2007	TwoInTheOneInThe	Salsa Windfall	Musical project with Paul Chell
2009	Old Wolf Thoughts	Funeral In The Mirror	Musical project with James Pinkstone
2010	The Depression Auction	Joe DeRosa	Stand-up comedy album
2011	Return Of The Son Of Depression Auction	Joe DeRosa	Stand-up comedy album
2013	You Will Die	Joe DeRosa	Stand-up comedy double album
2014	Mistakes Were Made: The B Sides	Joe DeRosa	Stand-up comedy double album
2016	DemonRiot	DemonRiot	Five-song digital EP released via Bandcamp
2016	Deformed Disco	DemonRiot	Four-song digital EP released via Bandcamp
2017	You Let Me Down	Joe DeRosa	Stand-up comedy album
2018	Just for Laughs: The Nasty Show, Vol. 1	Various Artists	One track on a compilation featuring comedians performing at the annual Just for Laughs festival.
2018	Just for Laughs: The Nasty Show, Vol. 2	Various Artists	Two tracks on a compilation featuring comedians performing at the annual Just for Laughs festival.
2018	I Go To Atlanta All The Time	Joe DeRosa	Stand-up comedy album originally aired exclusively on Raw Dog Comedy before hard copy release on November 15, 2019
2019	Just for Laughs: Funny AF, Vol. 5	Various Artists	Two tracks on a compilation featuring comedians performing at the annual Just for Laughs festival.
2023	Artificial Birth	Salsa Windfall	Musical project with Paul Chell

== Filmography ==
=== Film ===
Year	Film	Role	Notes
2006	Hysterical	Miles Mayfield	Short film
2010	Iron Manly	Producer	Short film
2010	Body Secrets	Joe	Short film
2010	The Jesus Fix	Guy	Short film
2010	Quarter Magic	Mel	Short film
2011	Hulks	Scientist	Short film
2011	Cheat	Joseph	Short film
2011	Bloopers	Reporter	Short film
2014	Women Aren't Funny	Himself	Writer
2020	The Opening Act	Radio Host	
2025	Screamboat	Paul Sanguino	

=== Television ===
Year	Series	Role	Notes
2004–2006	Last Call with Carson Daly	Himself	Episodes: "December 22, 2004" and "June 14, 2006"
2007	The Watch List	Himself	
2008	Z Rock	Squirt Reynolds	Episode: "1.6"
2008	Down and Dirty with Jim Norton	Himself	Episode: "1.4"
2009	Comedy Central Presents	Himself	Stand-up Special
2010	Bored to Death	Bob	Episode: "2.4 - I've Been Living Like a Demented God!"
2010	Chelsea Lately	Himself	Episodes: "4.20, 4.96 & 4.132"
2010–2013	Red Eye	Himself	37 episodes
2011	Louie	Evan	Episode: "Halloween/Ellie"
2012	I Love the 1880s	Himself	12 episodes
2013	The Half Hour	Himself	Stand-up Special
2013–2014	Inside Amy Schumer	John / Detective 1	2 episodes
2013–2014	The Pete Holmes Show	New Material Seinfeld (voice)	Also staff writer
2014	Comedy Underground with Dave Attell	Himself	Episode: "1.1"
2014	Sullivan & Son	Male Sex Addict	Episode: "3.4 - Sexual Healing"
2015–2022	Better Call Saul	Dr. Caldera	7 episodes (recurring character)
2015	Wet Hot American Summer: First Day of Camp		Staff writer
2016	This Is Not Happening	Himself	Episode: "2.5 - Melee"
2016–2017	Big Jay Oakerson's What's Your F@%king Deal?!	Himself	Episode: "1.1" as a comedian Episode: "2.8" as a co-host
2016	Take My Wife	Kent	Episode: "Punchline"
2016–2017	@midnight	Himself	Competed on four episodes of the show throughout 2016 and 2017
2017	You Let Me Down	Himself	Stand-up Special
2017	Jeff & Some Aliens		Writer of episode: "1.6 - Jeff & Some Confidence"
2017	Crashing		Writer and series consultant
2017	Pitch Off With Doug Benson	Himself	Episode: "1.13 - Pitch the Next Old Man Logan-style Superhero Movie to Doug"
2018	Living Biblically	Gary	Episode: "1.1 - Pilot"
2018	By Night: Origins	The Nocturnal	Three-episode horror anthology series. Also served as an executive producer.
2018	The Roast of Rich Vos	Himself	Released via Vimeo
2018	Take One Thing Off	The Producer	Episode: "Here We Are"
2019	Shit Show	Himself	Episode: "Joe DeRosa"
2019	Straight Up, Stand Up	Himself	Episode: "Back At UCB"
2019	Just Roll with It	Manager	Episode: "Blair Gets Grounded"
2024	Impractical Jokers	Himself	Episode: "Bowling for Dollars"
2025	Tires	Joe DeRosa	Episodes: 2.2 "HR" & 2.8 "Retirement" Also staff writer for second season

=== Web series ===
Year	Series	Role	Notes
2008	God & Co.	Voice actor	"Episode 3 - Getting There is Half the Fun"
2012	Overrated.	Co-host	Four-episode Official Comedy web series co-hosted with Kurt Metzger
2012	What Are We Waiting For?	Actor/Writer/Director	Six-part series for The Warner Sound
2012–2013	We Should Break Up	Actor/Writer/Director	Six-part series with Nikki Glaser
2019	You Let Me Down	Actor/Writer	Comedy Central shorts based on DeRosa's Penthouse column

=== Video games ===
Year	Video game	Voice role
2013	Grand Theft Auto V	Rufus Bellows
