= Anthony Jeselnik =

American actor and stand-up comedian (born 1978)

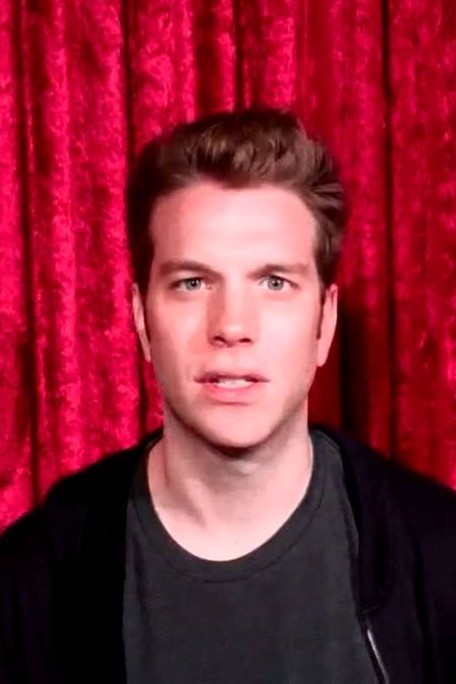
- Jeselnik in 2012
- Born: December 22, 1978 (age 47)
- Education: Tulane University
- Notable work: Comedy Central Roast; The Jeselnik Offensive; Shakespeare; Caligula

Comedy career
- Years active: 2001–present
- Medium: Stand-up, television
- Genres: Observational comedy; deadpan; black comedy; cringe comedy; insult comedy; shock humor; satire; one-liner
- Subjects: Everyday life; death; religion; philosophy; family; pop culture
- Website: AnthonyJeselnik.com

Anthony Jeselnik (/ˈdʒɛsəlnɪk/ JES-əl-nik; born December 22, 1978) is an American comedian, writer, actor, and producer. He is known for his dark comedy style, which emphasizes ironic misdirection, non sequiturs, biting insults, an arrogant demeanor, and a stage persona that frequently takes amoral stances.

Jeselnik was a writer for Late Night with Jimmy Fallon in its first season and hosted a Comedy Central Presents in 2009. After releasing his critically acclaimed debut album Shakespeare in 2010, he began writing for the Comedy Central Roasts and moved up to performer in the 2011 roast of Donald Trump. He continued to perform on the roasts of Charlie Sheen and Roseanne Barr in 2012. In 2013, he hosted his own Comedy Central series for two seasons, The Jeselnik Offensive, and released his second album, Caligula, which doubles as an hour-long stand-up special.

On July 22, 2015, Jeselnik replaced J. B. Smoove as the new host of NBC's Emmy Award-nominated series Last Comic Standing. His second stand-up special, Thoughts and Prayers, premiered in October 2015 on Netflix; his third, Fire in the Maternity Ward, premiered on Netflix in April 2019; his fourth, Bones and All, premiered on Netflix in November 2024. Jeselnik starred in the first season of the NFL Media podcast The Rosenthal & Jeselnik Vanity Project (or RJVP) along with best friend Gregg Rosenthal. The second season debuted in 2018 on the Comedy Central Podcast Network under the slightly different name of The Jeselnik & Rosenthal Vanity Project (or JRVP).

== Early life ==
Anthony Jeselnik grew up the oldest of five children in a Catholic family in Upper St. Clair, Pennsylvania. His father was a lawyer and his mother a housewife.

Jeselnik was interested in making others laugh from an early age. In elementary school, he would often interrupt the class to tell a joke. On one occasion, a classmate was moving to a different town that was not generally regarded well, and Jeselnik cracked a sarcastic comment: "Oh, well, send us a postcard." When the teacher laughed at his joke, he realized: "If you're smart enough that adults get it, you can get away with anything." He would often stay up attempting to watch Saturday Night Live and, as he grew older, The Ben Stiller Show and Mr. Show.

Jeselnik graduated from Upper St. Clair High School in 1997. He earned a bachelor's degree in English literature with a business minor from Tulane University in 2001. During his senior year at Tulane, his girlfriend accidentally burned down his apartment, which he would later use as early stand-up material. He was a member of the Alpha Tau Omega fraternity while at Tulane University. His original dream was to write the Great American Novel, but an internship in Los Angeles between his junior and senior years of college convinced him there were other avenues for a writer.

Jeselnik first tried standup in the early 2000s, while in his early 20s, after moving to Los Angeles and taking a day job at a Borders. He found a book by writer and comedian Greg Dean that promoted Dean's Santa Monica comedy workshops. In his first attempt at a joke, Jeselnik did an impression of his father being stung by wasps. By the end of the skit—which lasted only one minute, but Jeselnik claimed "felt like 10"—no one had laughed, leading Jeselnik to swear off physical comedy forever. After being fired by Borders, he worked behind the scenes as an accounting clerk for the TV series Deadwood, during which time he would perform at open-mic nights.

Inspired in part by Mitch Hedberg, Dennis Miller, Sarah Silverman, and Steven Wright, it was two years into his stand-up comedy career when Jeselnik had a "lightbulb moment". After writing a bizarre joke with a dark twist to it, the audience response encouraged Jeselnik to focus more in that area. The joke, titled "My Girlfriend Loves to Eat Chocolate", was later featured on Shakespeare.

At the Comedy Cellar, Jeselnik was influenced by how comedians derided each other, especially Jim Norton, Colin Quinn, Bobby Kelly, and Keith Robinson.

== Career ==
Jeselnik's Comedy Central Presents stand-up special premiered in 2009, and he was named one of Comedy Central's breakout comedians of the year alongside Nick Kroll, Aziz Ansari, Whitney Cummings, Donald Glover, Matt Braunger, T. J. Miller, Kumail Nanjiani, and Jon Lajoie. In 2009, Jeselnik was hired as a writer for Late Night with Jimmy Fallon. His dream job, predating stand-up or his first comedy class, was to sit around a table and "throw out jokes with people you respected." After getting the job, Jeselnik's pitches would be continually shot down as they were too dark. For example, he routinely fought for a single joke regarding obesity each day for a month, and although Fallon liked the joke, he felt uncomfortable performing it as it would likely jeopardize his likability with the obese. During this period, he was a regular at the Comedy Cellar in Greenwich Village, New York City. Jeselnik would work hard each day for the show and then proceed to go to Comedy Cellar, have a "big stiff drink", and do his act, feeling "miserable". In March 2010, he approached the show's producers and told them he wanted to leave. "We understand—you want to go be Anthony Jeselnik", they said.

He recorded his debut album, Shakespeare, and in 2010 began writing for the Comedy Central Roasts. Jeselnik, who refers to roasts as "the Super Bowl of comedy", loved roasts during college and always tried to write for them. While Jeselnik was writing for the David Hasselhoff roast, Comedy Central executives took an interest in him and offered him an opportunity to perform on the next roast. Knowing that this would be his "big moment", Jeselnik refers to the Roast of Donald Trump as "one of my favorite moments of my life [...] because no one knew who I was and it just really caught everybody by surprise. And the next day, my life was completely different." While Jeselnik had previously been headlining clubs, the audience often was unfamiliar with his brand of comedy; after the Trump roast, the crowds got bigger and Jeselnik felt more comfortable. Immediately following his performance, the network offered Jeselnik a "three-point deal" in which one receives an hour special, three Comedy Central roasts, and a development deal. Jeselnik went on to perform at two more roasts, the Comedy Central Roasts of Charlie Sheen in 2011 and Roseanne Barr in 2012.

Jeselnik appeared at the Power of Comedy event in November 2012.

In 2013, Jeselnik hosted his own Comedy Central series, The Jeselnik Offensive. In preparing the show, Comedy Central was looking for a half-hour, a four-nights-a-week show following The Colbert Report titled Midnight. Jeselnik's main draw was the monologue, where he felt he could tell jokes that he was unable to do on Late Night with Jimmy Fallon. For the pilot, Jeselnik did a test interview with a celebrity but felt "so wrong [...] it just fit me like a bad suit." For the show's first episode, Jeselnik performs cancer-related stand-up for a cancer support group. "I had to fight with Comedy Central to put that on the first episode", said Jeselnik. The network felt uneasy using the sketch as an introduction. Jeselnik pointed to the premiere episode of Chappelle's Show, in which Dave Chappelle plays a blind African-American Klansman, which he regarded as "one of the edgiest things they ever did." As such, the sketch opened the first episode and received a positive reception; Jay Leno called to inform Jeselnik "how much he loved the cancer segment." The Jeselnik Offensive ran for two seasons on Comedy Central from February 19, 2013, to August 27, 2013.

Jeselnik's first stand-up special, Caligula, premiered in 2013.

October 2015 saw the debut of The Rosenthal & Jeselnik Vanity Project (RJVP), a podcast available on NFL.com hosted by Jeselnik and fellow Tulane graduate, NFL Network's Gregg Rosenthal.

In 2015 Jeselnik released his critically acclaimed third stand up special, and first for Netflix, Thoughts and Prayers. The hourlong special offers Jeselnik's trademark dark humor for the first forty minutes and personal anecdotes for the last twenty. He discusses his grandmother's funeral, the Boston Marathon bombing, the cancelation of The Jeselnik Offensive, and the death threats he receives.

In September 2018 Jeselnik returned to Comedy Central, signing a multi-platform development deal which includes new episodes of a weekly podcast, The Jeselnik & Rosenthal Vanity Project (JRVP), where Jeselnik is joined by his friend and NFL Network analyst Gregg Rosenthal, and by producer and NFL Network director Erica Tamposi. As of April 2024, over 240 episodes have been released.

Jeselnik's fourth stand-up special, Fire in the Maternity Ward, was released by Netflix on April 30, 2019. This was followed recently by a fifth Netflix special, Bones and All, released on November 26, 2024.

== Personal life ==
Jeselnik dated comedian Amy Schumer from 2009 until 2011.

Jeselnik is an atheist.

He is of Slovenian descent. He said that he found out online that the surname Jeselnik is Slovenian.

== Discography ==
- Shakespeare (2010)
- Caligula (2013)
- Thoughts and Prayers (2015)
- Fire in the Maternity Ward (2019)
- Bones and All (2024)

== Filmography ==
=== Television ===
| Year | Title | Role | Notes |
|---|---|---|---|
| 2006 | Premium Blend | Himself | |
| 2008 | Down and Dirty with Jim Norton | Himself | Episode: "1.1" |
| 2009 | Comedy Central Presents | Himself | Stand-up special |
| 2009–2010 | Late Night with Jimmy Fallon | Himself, Ron Dempsey (uncredited) | Performed stand-up twice; also writer |
| 2011 | Just for Laughs | Himself | Episode: "The Nasty Show" |
| 2011 | Comedy Central Roast of Donald Trump | Himself | TV special |
| 2011 | Comedy Central Roast of Charlie Sheen | Himself | TV special |
| 2011 | John Oliver's New York Stand-Up Show | Himself | Episode: "2.3" |
| 2012 | Comedy Central Roast of Roseanne Barr | Himself | TV special |
| 2012–2013 | The Burn with Jeff Ross | Himself | 2 episodes |
| 2013 | Anthony Jeselnik: Caligula | Himself | Stand-up special |
| 2013 | The Jeselnik Offensive | Host | 18 episodes; also creator, writer, executive producer |
| 2013 | Maron | Himself | Episode: "Sex Fest" |
| 2014 | Garfunkel & Oates | Thomas | Episode: "The Fadeaway" |
| 2014 | Comedy Bang! Bang! | Himself | Episode: "Amber Tamblyn Wears a Leather Jacket & Black Booties" |
| 2015 | Last Comic Standing | Host | 8 episodes |
| 2015 | Anthony Jeselnik: Thoughts and Prayers | Himself | Netflix stand-up special |
| 2018 | Jeff Ross Presents Roast Battle | Himself | Judge |
| 2019 | Anthony Jeselnik: Fire in the Maternity Ward | Himself | Netflix stand-up special |
| 2019 | Good Talk with Anthony Jeselnik | Host | 6 episodes |
| 2024 | Bones and All | Himself | Netflix stand-up special |

=== As writer ===
| Year | Title | Notes |
|---|---|---|
| 2007 | 2007 MTV Movie Awards | TV special |
| 2008 | Night of Too Many Stars: An Overbooked Concert for Autism Education | TV special |
| 2010 | Comedy Central Roast of David Hasselhoff | TV special |
| 2010 | Night of Too Many Stars: An Overbooked Concert for Autism Education | TV special |
| 2013 | Comedy Central Roast of James Franco | TV special |
