= Thoughts and Prayers (2015 film) =

- Written by: Anthony Jeselnik
- Directed by: Adam Dubin
- Starring: Anthony Jeselnik
- Country of origin: United States
- Original language: English

Production
- Running time: 59 minutes

Original release
- Network: Netflix
- Release: October 16, 2015

Thoughts and Prayers is a 2015 Netflix stand-up comedy special by American comic Anthony Jeselnik, his first Netflix stand-up special for Netflix. In Thoughts and Prayers, directed by Adam Dubin in San Francisco at The Fillmore, Anthony talks about death, animal cruelty, serial killing, and more.

== Release ==
Anthony Jeselnik: Thoughts and Prayers was released on October 16, 2015 on Netflix.

== Reception ==
Anthony Jeselnik: Thoughts and Prayers received critical acclaim, with many critics highlighting the eponymous track and Jeselnik's delivery of serious topics.
