= Four Winds =

Four Winds may refer to:

- Classical compass winds, the winds associated with the points of the compass

== Mythology ==
- The Anemoi, personifications of winds in Greek mythology
- The Four Winds (Mesopotamian)

== Businesses ==
- Four Winds Casinos, Michigan, United States
- Four Winds International, a motorhome manufacturer (now known as Thor Motor Coach)

== Literature ==
- Four Winds (play), a 1953 play by Alex Atkinson
- The Four Winds, a 2021 novel by Kristin Hannah

== Music ==
- Four Winds (EP), a 2007 EP by Bright Eyes, or the title track
  - "Four Winds", a cover of the song by The Killers
- Four Winds (album), a 2009 album by The Lightning Seeds
- "Four Winds", a song from the 1999 album Guitars by Mike Oldfield

== Places ==
- Four Winds (New Orleans), a historic apartment building in New Orleans, Louisiana, United States
- Casinos in Michigan, United States:
  - Four Winds Dowagiac
  - Four Winds Hartford
  - Four Winds New Buffalo
- Four Winds Field at Coveleski Stadium, baseball facility, South Bend, Indiana, United States

== See also ==
- Four Winns, former American boat-builder
- The Four Winds of Love, series of novels by Compton Mackenzie
