= Greg Fitzsimmons =

American comedian and writer (1966)

- Fitzsimmons performing stand-up comedy
- Born: Gregory Sebastian Fitzsimmons; April 5, 1966 (age 60); New York, New York, U.S.

Comedy career
- Years active: 1988–present
- Medium: Stand-up, television
- Genre: Stand-up comedy
- Subject: observational comedy
- Website: www.gregfitzsimmons.com

Gregory Sebastian Fitzsimmons (born April 5, 1966) is an American stand-up comedian, actor, podcaster, and Emmy Award–winning television writer.

== Early life ==
Fitzsimmons was raised in Tarrytown, New York to Bob (1939–1993) and Patricia Marie Judith (née McCarthy) Fitzsimmons. Greg's father was a New York City radio and television personality who was one of the original presenters of Good Day New York and was a host of the Jerry Lewis Muscular Dystrophy Telethon from 1973 to 1989.

Greg began his stand-up comedy career while attending Boston University, where he earned his undergraduate degree and was part of comedy troupe Uncontrolled Substance.

== Career ==
Fitzsimmons made his late-night debut in 1996 on the Late Show with David Letterman. That same year he began hosting MTV's Idiot Savants which received a CableACE Award for Best Game Show Special or Series.

Fitzsimmons served as a writer on the first three seasons of The Ellen DeGeneres Show for which he received one nomination and four Daytime Emmy Awards. In a 2010 interview with Howard Stern, he described the work environment as "toxic." A decade later these allegations were substantiated in an exposé by Buzzfeed News citing the experiences of ten former employees.

From 2004 to 2009 Fitzsimmons was a regular commentator on Vh1's Best Week Ever and from 2010 to 2014 he made over 40 appearances on Chelsea Lately.

Fitzsimmons was a frequent guest on The Howard Stern Show throughout the late nineties and early 2000s. He was a finalist to replace Jackie Martling after Martling's departure, a position that ultimately went to Artie Lange. In 2006, he began hosting The Greg Fitzsimmons Show on SiriusXM's Howard 101. There were several memorable moments over the course of the series including his interview with Andy Dick that resulted in Dick being banned from the channel over antisemitic comments toward Stern in 2011. The final episode of The Greg Fitzsimmons Show aired in 2018.

Fitzsimmons has toured the United States as a stand-up comedian and has performed on such programs as The Tonight Show with Jay Leno, Late Show with David Letterman, Late Night with Conan O'Brien and Jimmy Kimmel Live!.

In 2013, his one-hour special "Life on Stage" premiered on Comedy Central.

Fitzsimmons hosts a comedy podcast Fitzdog Radio. The show features interviews with celebrities, musical guests and comedians. Listener call-ins are encouraged throughout the show. Guests have included Zach Galifianakis, Leslie Jones, Whitney Cummings and Judd Apatow. As of August 2023, the series has aired over 1,000 episodes. He also hosts Sunday Papers with sidekick/producer Mike Gibbons (aka "Gibby") and Childish with comedian Alison Rosen.

== Writing ==
Fitzsimmons began his writing career on Politically Incorrect with Bill Maher. From 2003 to 2005, he was a writer and producer on The Ellen DeGeneres Show for which he received one nomination and four Daytime Emmy Awards. He has also written for Cedric the Entertainer, The Man Show, The Wanda Sykes Show, Lucky Louie, and most recently HBO's Crashing.

== Personal life ==
Greg is married and has two children. He is a cousin of professional golfer Denny McCarthy.

== Filmography ==
=== Stand-up comedy releases ===
Solo albums and TV specials
Title	Release date	Debut medium
Comedy Central Presents: Greg Fitzsimmons	December 29, 1998	Television (Comedy Central)
Fitz of Laughter	2000	Audio CD
Comedy Central Presents: Greg Fitzsimmons 2	March 17, 2006	Television (Comedy Central)
Life on Stage	August 27, 2013	Television (Comedy Central)
You Know Me	August 27, 2024	Streaming TV (YouTube)

Collaborative albums and TV specials
Title	Release date	Debut medium
Bob & Tom: Fun House	August 1997	Audio CD
The World Comedy Tour: Melbourne 2001	2001	Television (The Comedy Channel)
The N.Y. Friars Club Roast of Chevy Chase	December 1, 2002	Television (Comedy Central)
Just For Laughs: Volume 5 – Over the Edge	August 18, 2009	DVD Video

=== Television and film ===
Performances in television and film
Year	Title	Role	Notes
1999	Doing Time		Unaired pilot written by Dave Attell
2002	The Andy Dick Show	Brother	1 episode
2003	The Gynecologists	Chick	Short film by Adam Dubin
2004	The Man Show	Frozen Ted Williams	1 episode
2008	CSI Crime Scene Investigation		1 episode
2011	Division III: Football's Finest	Jerry	
2014	Louie	Greg	1 episode
2015	Aqua Teen Hunger Force	Randy (voice)	1 episode
2015	Comedy Bang! Bang!	Mailman	1 episode
2017	Santa Clarita Diet	Sheriff's Deputy	1 episode
2018–2019	Crashing	Greg Fitzsimmons	2 episodes

=== As himself ===
Non-acting television and film credits
Year	Title	Credited as	Notes
1996–1997	Idiot Savants	Host	
1997	Make Me Laugh	Self	
1997–2006	Just For Laughs	Self	3 episodes
1997	Premium Blend	Self	1 episode
1998	Inside Jokes	Self	
2001	The Test with Jillian Barberie	Panelist	1 episode
2001	Late Friday with Joe Rogan	Self	2 episodes
2002	Tough Crowd with Colin Quinn	Panelist	1 episode
2002	I Love the '80s	Self	
2003	I Love the '70s	Self	
2003	Shorties Watchin' Shorties	Self	1 episode
2004	I Love the '90s	Self	
2005	I Love the '90s	Self	
2005	I Love the '80s	Self	3 episodes
2005	I Love the Holidays	Self	
2005	23rd AVN Awards	Host	
2006	I Love Toys	Self	
2006	I Love the '70s	Self	4 episodes
2007	Porky's: A Comedy Classic	Self	Short film with Dante
2007	What I Learned About... From the Movies	Self	
2007	Heckler	Self	Documentary film
2007	Rock Band Cometh: The Rock Band Band Story	Self	Documentary film
2008	History of the Joke	Self	Documentary film
2008	Here Come the Newlyweds	Self	1 episode
2008	25th AVN Awards	Host	
2008	I Love the New Millennium	Self	3 episodes
2008	Best Week Ever with Paul F. Tompkins	Self	1 episode
2009	Naked Ambition: An R Rated Look at an X Rated Industry	Self	Documentary film
2010	John Oliver's New York Stand Up Show	Self	2 episodes
2010	The Wanda Sykes Show	Self	1 episode
2010	A Night of 140 Tweets: A Celebrity Tweet-A-Thon for Haiti	Self	Web special by Red Hour Productions and Funny or Die
2010–2014	Chelsea Lately	Panelist	41 episodes
2011	Pumped!	Host	19 episodes
2011	Dave's Old Porn	Self	1 episode
2011	AM Northwest	Self	1 episode
2012	Un-Cabaret	Self	1 episode
2014	Upload with Shaquille O'Neal	Self	1 episode
2014–2015	How To Be A Grown Up with Tom Segura	Self	11 episodes
2016	This Is Not Happening	Self	1 episode
2019–2020	Lights Out with David Spade	Panelist	6 episodes

== Books ==
- Greg Fitzsimmons. (2010). Dear Mrs. Fitzsimmons: Tales of Redemption from an Irish Mailbox. New York: Simon & Schuster. ISBN 978-1-43918-26-9-7.
