= River Lights =

2015 Sculpture by Rob Shakespeare in South Bend, Indiana, US

Coordinates: 41.677°N 86.247°W

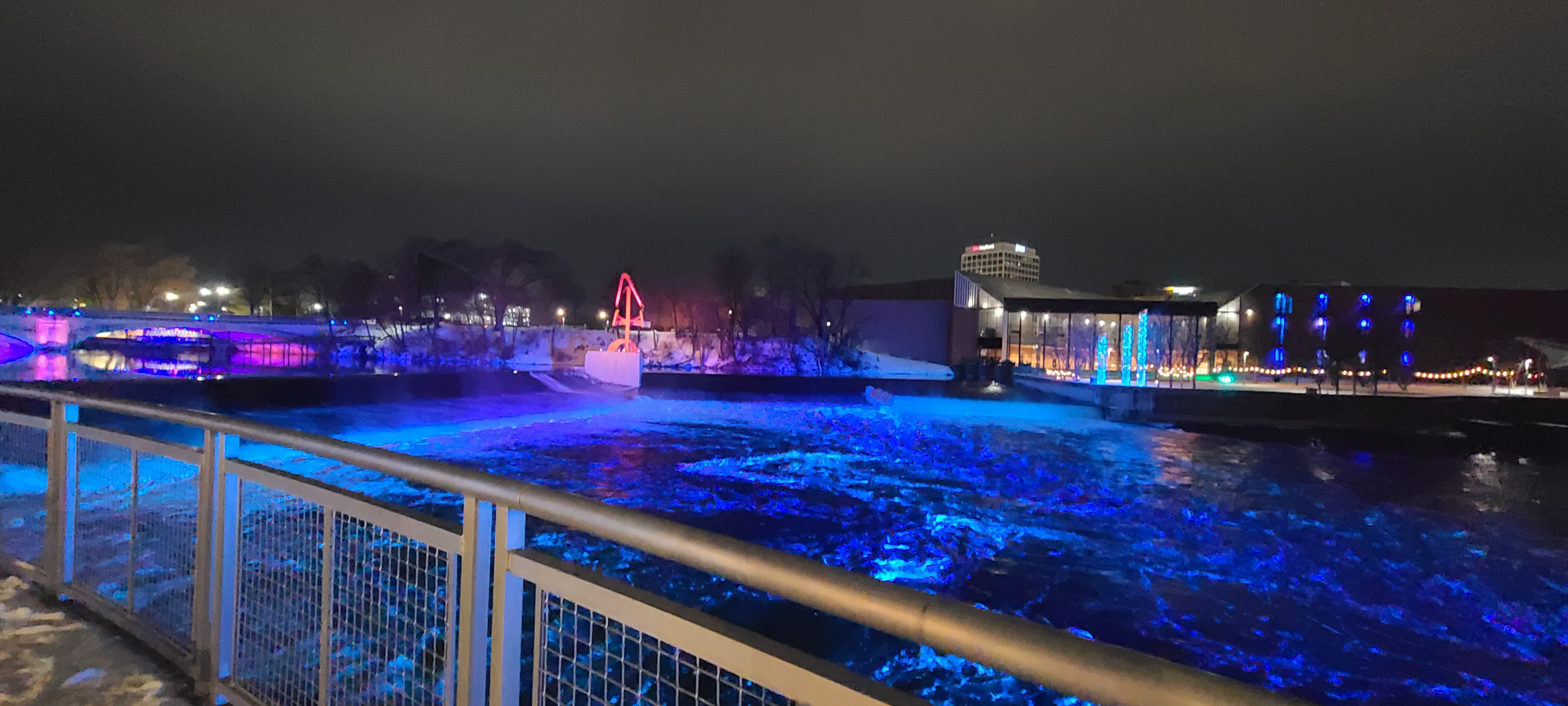
- Artist: Rob Shakespeare
- Year: 2015
- Location: South Bend, Indiana, US
- Website: sbvpa.org/places/river-lights/

The River Lights, also known as the South Bend River Lights, are a 2015 permanent interactive light sculpture along several places on the St. Joseph River in South Bend, Indiana, U.S. The River Lights, designed by Bloomington-based artist Rob Shakespeare, commemorate the 150th anniversary of South Bend being granted a city charter. It was installed under South Bend's Venues Parks and Arts director Aaron Perri.

== Design ==
The River Lights were one part of a $25 million downtown renewal project, with planning starting in 2012. Pete Buttigieg, then-mayor of South Bend, envisioned the lights increasing the appeal of South Bend's downtown area. The lights activate daily, turning on 30 minutes before sunset. The display uses roughly 12kWh of energy, and is powered by a nearby hydroelectric generator in the river.

Light fixtures were added under the Jefferson Boulevard Bridge and below Mark di Suvero's Keepers of the Fire sculpture. The River Lights project also encompassed the building of three new sculpture installations along the river. Two self-illuminated aluminum tower sculptures stand at opposite river banks. The sculpture known as Trio stands on the west bank. It consists of three 30 ft (9.1 m) brushed aluminum towers. Forest, the sculpture on the east bank, consists of five 24 ft (7.3 m) towers on steel trunks. Crescent is a curved structure that casts light across the river. The installation of over 200 lights was artist Rob Shakespeare's largest project at the time of its completion. The interactive features share some similarities with Shakespeare's previous work, Indiana University Bloomington's Light Totem, although the interactive elements of River Lights are more refined.

The equipment was manufactured by Martin Professional, Lumenpulse Lighting, and Philips Color Kinetics. The control system, designed by Mike Brubaker, can be operated remotely by a programmer. Three Pharos brand lighting playback controllers control the light display. The controls enable a 5-minute light show to play at sunset as well as enabling pedestrians along the river walk to "throw" light via motion controls. Colors of the lights are coordinated with holidays and special occasions (such as pink for Breast Cancer Awareness Month or blue and gold for Notre Dame victories).

== Construction ==
Design and fabrication of the sculptures was underway by December 2014. Installation was done by a team of volunteers that included members of a local electrical union. The sculptures were unveiled in a special lighting ceremony celebrating South Bend's 150th anniversary that took place on May 22, 2015. The opening of the ceremony included performances by the Pokagon band of Potawatomi, a special community choir assembled for the SB150 celebrations, and a speech by Pete Buttigieg. The ceremony began at 9:30 P.M.

Between design and construction, total cost for the entire light project was roughly $750,000. An additional $150,000 of funding came from the city's budget for the 150th anniversary celebration. Other contributions by local residents and businesses including monetary donations, discounts, and reduced-price labor aided the financing as well. Estimated maintenance costs were projected at $5,000 per year.

=== Seitz Park renovations ===
Renovation of Seitz Park for the University of Notre Dame's hydroelectric plant project necessitated the take-down and storage of parts of the installation. These parts were restored for the reopening of the park on July 17, 2025.

== Gallery ==
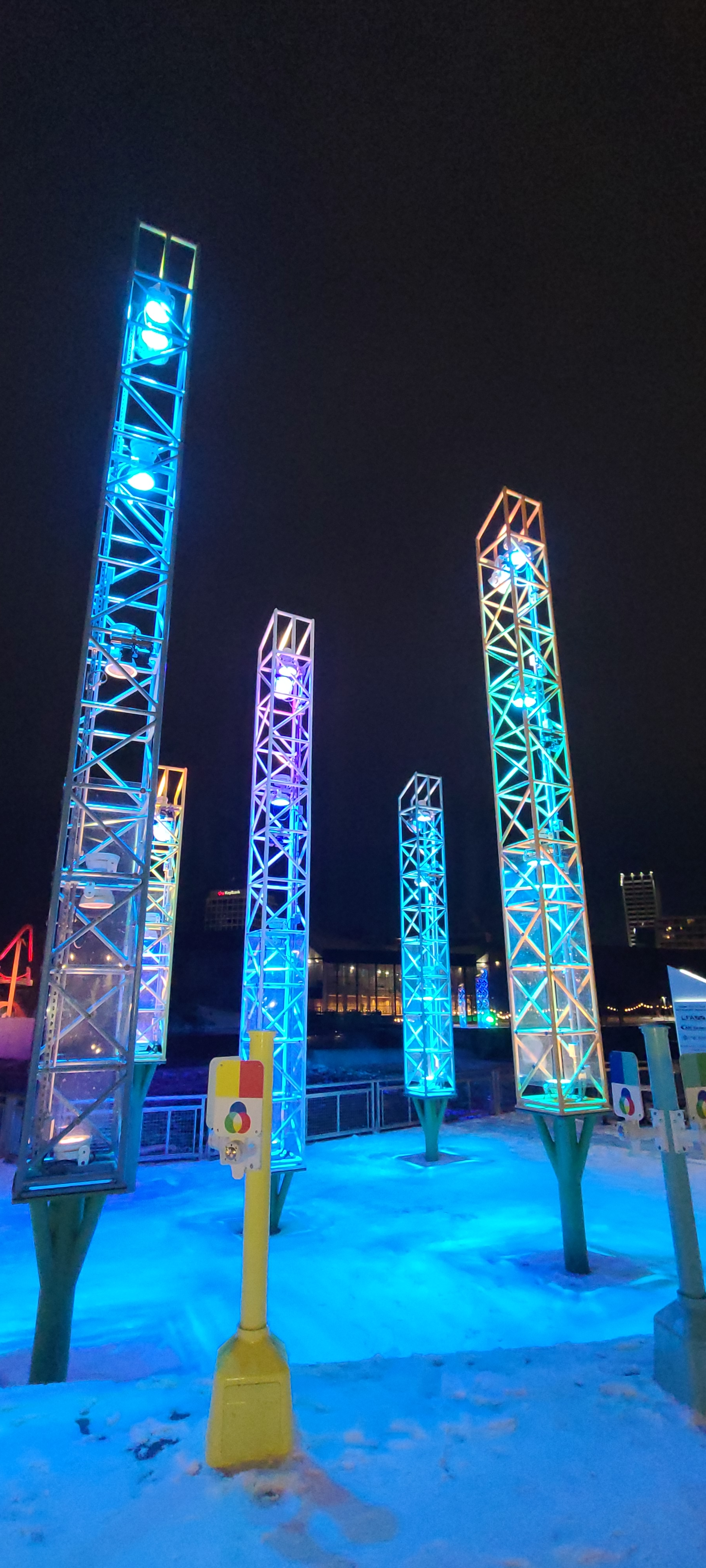
The Forest sculpture illuminated

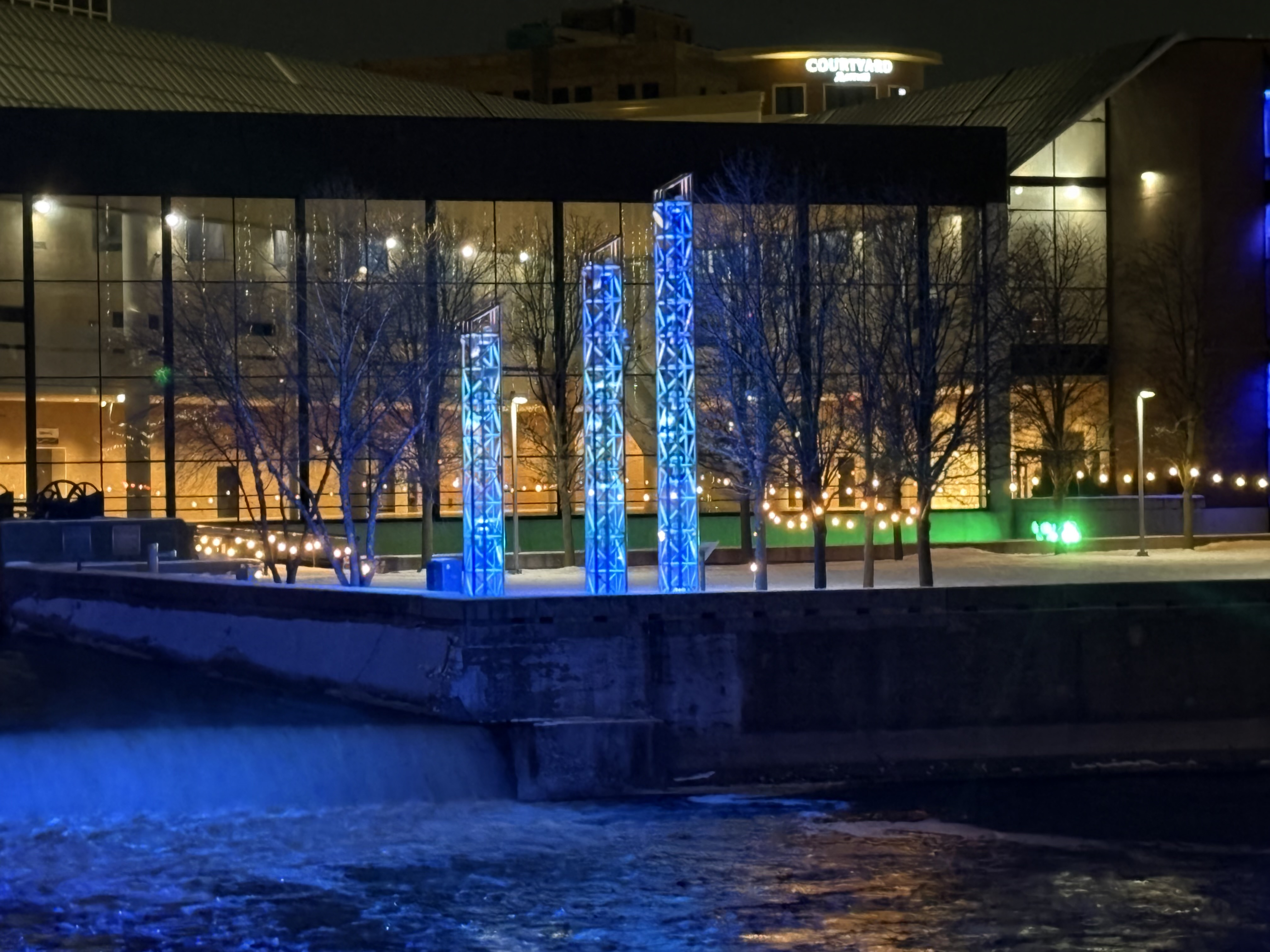
Trio as viewed from the east bank of the River Lights installation

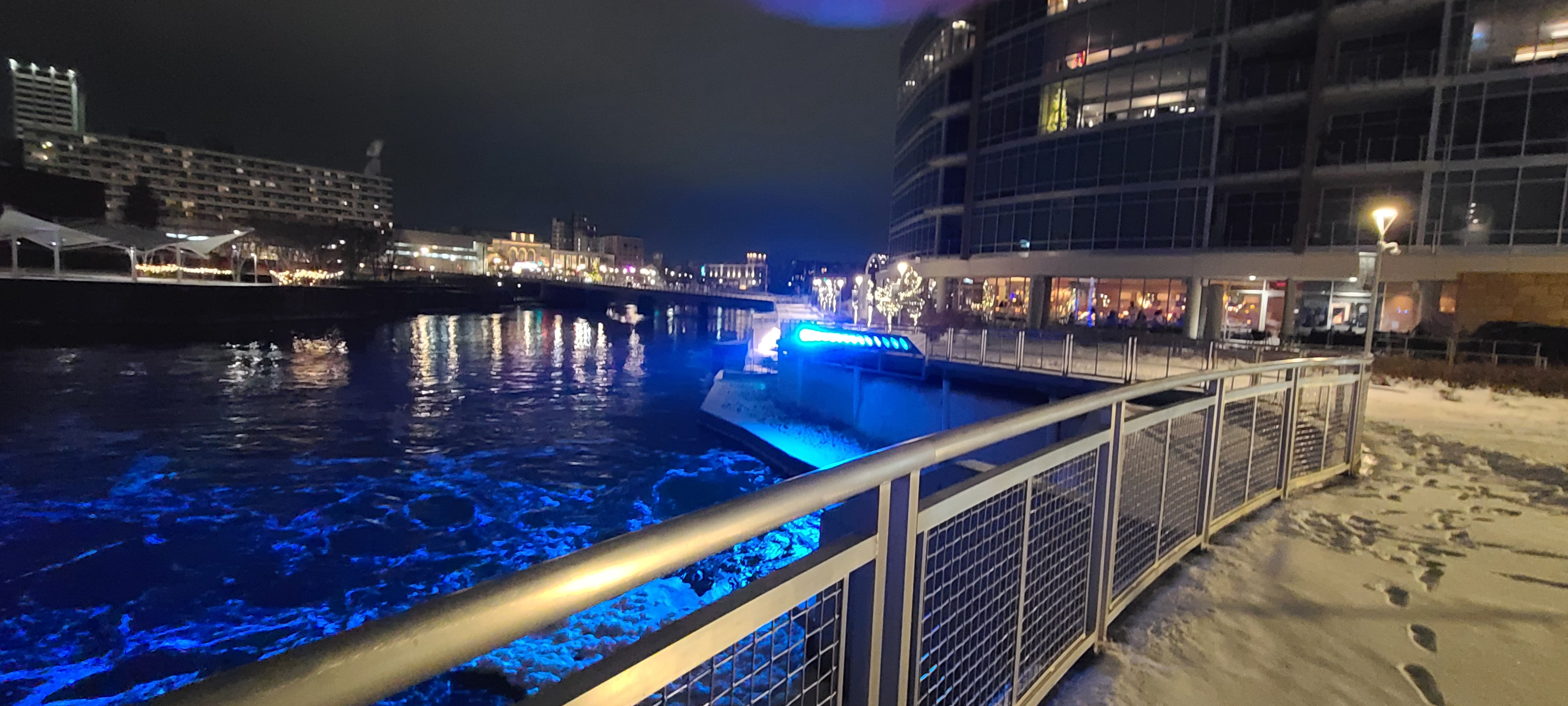
Crescent casting light over the waters of the St. Joseph

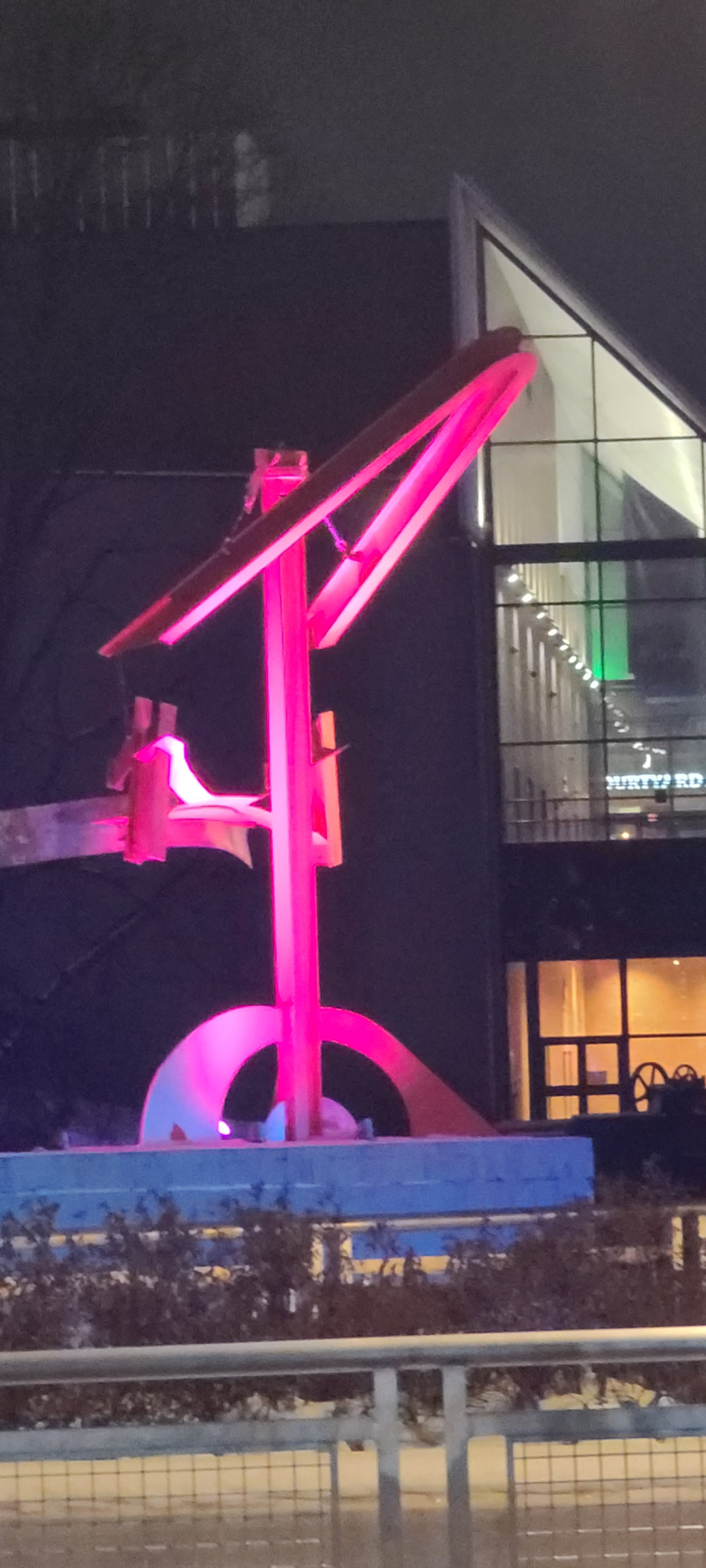
The Keepers of the Fire sculpture lit

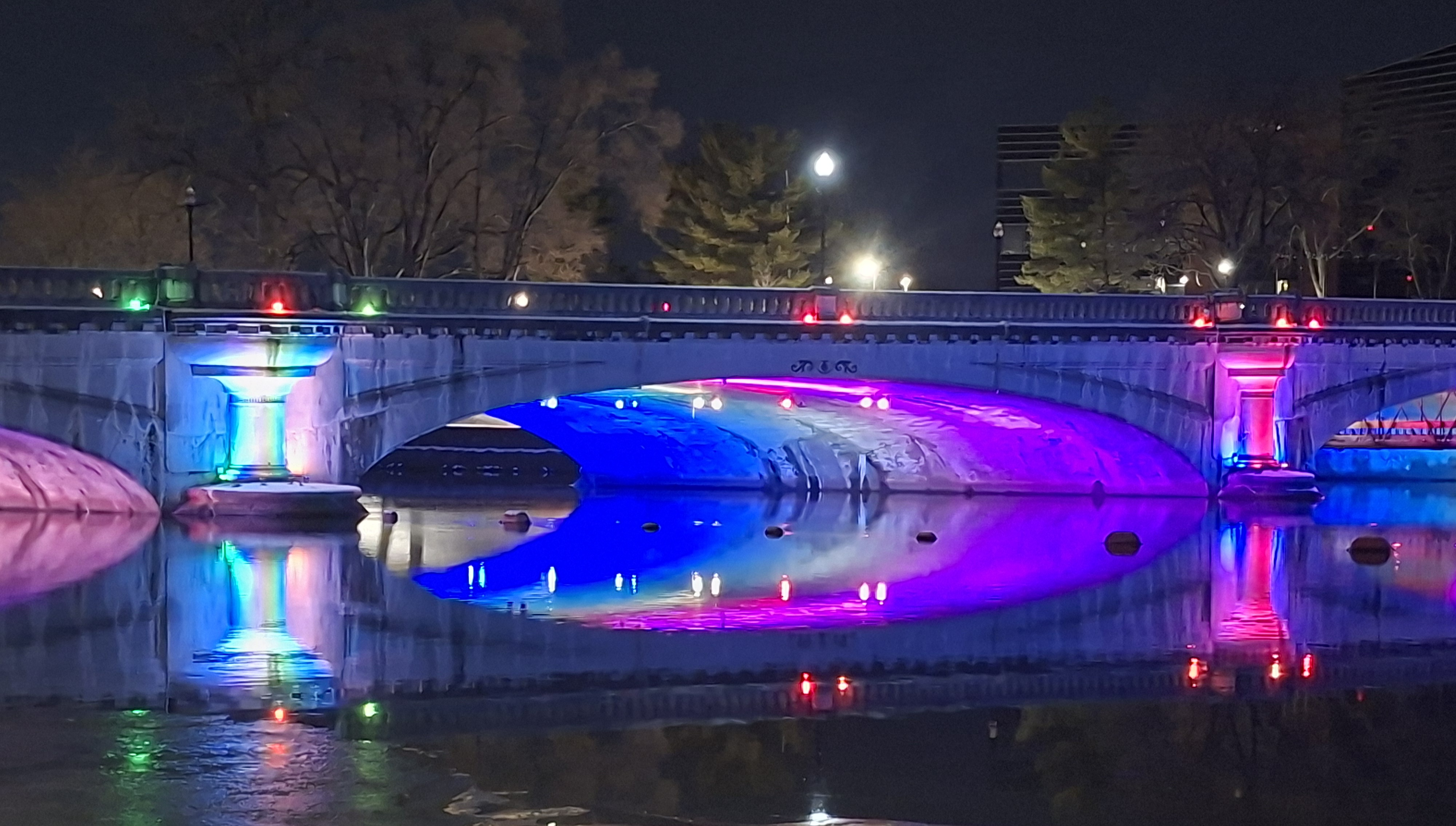
The lights under the Jefferson Blvd. bridge
