= History of the Joke =

American TV documentary about humor

- Narrated by: Lewis Black
- Country of origin: United States

Original release
- Release: February 18, 2008

History of the Joke is a two-hour television special documentary film that was premiered on February 18, 2008, in the USA on History.

This special was hosted by Lewis Black and starred Mitch Fatel, Ed Galvez, Jessica Glassberg, George Carlin, Shelley Berman, Jimmy Carr, Jeff Dunham, Steve Byrne, Gallagher, Patton Oswalt, Aisha Tyler, Robin Williams, Brian Posehn, Greg Fitzsimmons, Gina Yashere, George Lopez, Lynne Koplitz, Kathy Griffin, Dave Attell, and Penn & Teller. In the show, Black considers all of the different components of the perfect joke and all types of comedy, including physical comedy and slapstick. The jokes ranged over all types of subject matter: children, race, sex and religion. The show is broken down into thirteen parts: comedy, physical comedy, timing is everything, improv, born funny?, ladies and gentlemen, dirty jokes, taboos, the bomb, hecklers, pain, the truth and what is laughter? Professor Richard Wiseman explains the scientific and psychological source of comedy and talks about his search for the world's funniest joke. The history of comedy is covered from ancient Greek street performers, the masked performers of mid-16th century Italy to possibly the first female comedians from Shakespearean actresses (although there were few if any female actresses in Shakespearean times because all female roles were played by men) and English Restoration.
