= Idiot Savants (game show) =

American game show

- Genre: Comedy/Game Show
- Created by: Michael Dugan; Chris Kreski
- Written by: Tom Cohen
- Directed by: Steve Paley
- Presented by: Greg Fitzsimmons
- Narrated by: Marc Price; Paul Kozlowski
- Country of origin: United States

Production
- Production location: New York City
- Running time: 30 minutes
- Production company: MTV Productions

Original release
- Network: MTV
- Release: December 9, 1996 – April 25, 1997

Idiot Savants is an American television game show on the MTV network which ran from December 9, 1996, to April 25, 1997. It was created by Michael Dugan and Chris Kreski, directed by Steve Paley, and hosted by comedian Greg Fitzsimmons.

The show's title is a reference to savant syndrome.

== Format ==
Four contestants competed through an entire week of shows (Monday through Friday), answering questions in a variety of categories. In each of the first four shows of the week, contestants were eliminated one by one, and the day's top scorer played a bonus round for a prize. However, all four contestants returned to start each new episode, and each contestant's scores from the Monday through Thursday episodes were added together to create a total that served as his/her starting point for Friday's game. The contestant who had the highest total at the end of the Friday episode won the week's grand prize, usually a vacation or a car.

Before appearing on the show, each contestant chose a specific topic in which he/she was particularly knowledgeable as his/her "savant category." These categories covered a broad range of fields such as entertainment, academics, and popular culture.

Many of the questions were asked (or performed) by the "Savant Players", a group of actors who presented comical sketches that led to the questions. Many of these actors were also writers on the show, including senior writer Tom Cohen, along with Jason Nash, Paul Kozlowski, Eric Friedman, and Shonda Farr.

=== Monday–Thursday ===
The contestants' scores were set to zero at the start of each day. On Monday episodes, initial control of Round 1 was determined first by a toss-up question, and later by a random draw.

==== Round 1 ====
The contestant in control chose one of eight categories from a board. A toss-up question was asked, and the first contestant to buzz in with the right answer received 100 points and the chance to answer a bonus question worth 200 points. If that contestant answered the bonus correctly, he/she then had the right to try for a 300-point "Big Gamble" question, the last in the category. No points were deducted for a miss on the toss-up or bonus questions, but an incorrect response on the Big Gamble deducted 300. Whenever a contestant answered incorrectly or ran out of time on a bonus or Big Gamble, the other contestants could buzz in and give the correct answer to steal the points, after which the category would be closed and the contestant in control would choose another one. A category would also end if the same contestant answered the toss-up and bonus, but declined the Big Gamble, or if no one answered the toss-up or bonus correctly.

The round ended when either time ran out or all eight categories had been used. At this point, the lowest scorer was labeled as the day's "dunce" and made to sit in a corner of the stage, separate from the other contestants.

==== Round 2 ====
The question format remained the same, but all point values were doubled (200, 400, +/-600 points), and category selection was given to the "Brain" (an on-stage oversized brain featuring a monitor showing a close-up of announcer Marc Price's face). If none of the three contestants could answer a particular question correctly, the dunce was given a chance to answer and steal the points, after which a new category was announced. At the end of this round, both the dunce and the lowest scorer of the other three contestants were eliminated for the day. The dunce on any given episode received initial control of Round 1 for the next day.

==== Round 3: Brainstorm Round ====
Rapid fire questions from a specific category were asked over a period of 60 seconds (later reduced to 45 seconds). Contestants earned 200 points for a correct answer, and lost 200 points for an incorrect answer. The contestant in the lead after this round advanced to the Grand Savant Round.

==== Grand Savant Round ====
The winner of each day's contest played the bonus round for a mid-level prize, such as a vacation or a television set. For the Grand Savant Round, the contestant was placed into a device called the "Cylinder of Shush", a clear tube somewhat reminiscent of the "Cone of Silence" from Get Smart, but covering the entire upper half of the contestant's body.

The contestant was then asked a series of rapid fire questions from his or her savant category, and had to answer 10 of them correctly within the allotted time to win the bonus prize. Win or lose, 200 points were added to the contestant's weekly total for each question answered correctly. The time limit was originally 45 seconds, but was soon increased to 60 seconds.

=== Friday Finals ===
Each contestant started with the total points they had accumulated over the previous four episodes. Point values for the first two rounds were doubled (200/400/600, then 400/800/1200), and the lowest scorer at the end of each round was permanently eliminated from the game.

Instead of playing a Brainstorm after Round 2, the two remaining players competed for the weekly grand prize in the "Double Grand Savant" final round. Each contestant entered the Cylinder of Shush and answered questions in his/her savant category for 60 seconds, receiving 1,000 points per correct answer. Once both contestants had played, the one in the lead became that week's champion and won the high-level grand prize. Four new contestants appeared the following Monday.

== Awards ==
In spite of its short run, Idiots Savants won the CableAce Award for Outstanding Game Show in 1997.
