= Thanks for Risking Your Life =

Comedy film

- Written by: Lewis Black
- Directed by: Benjamin Brewer
- Starring: Lewis Black
- Country of origin: United States
- Original language: English

Production
- Producers: Jack Gulick; Benjamin Brewer
- Editor: Derek Ambrosi
- Running time: 63 minutes

Original release
- Release: October 6, 2020

Thanks for Risking Your Life

Live album by Lewis Black
- Released: October 6, 2020
- Recorded: Four Winds New Buffalo, New Buffalo Township, Michigan, March 13, 2020
- Genre: Comedy
- Length: 1:17:17
- Label: The Laugh Button Records

Thanks for Risking Your Life is a stand-up comedy film starring Lewis Black and directed by Benjamin Brewer. The set was recorded shortly before all live entertainment was halted due to the COVID-19 pandemic. The show was filmed on sovereign land at the Four Winds New Buffalo casino in New Buffalo Township, Michigan. The album version was nominated for the Grammy Award for Best Comedy Album but lost to Sincerely by Louis C.K.

== Track listing ==
1. "Thanks for Risking Your Life" – 2:01
2. "2 Day Free Shipping" – 9:07
3. "Don’t Worry, Be Happy" – 5:33
4. "An Important Lesson from Our Leader" – 2:49
5. "Prevagen" – 5:40
6. "The New Drug Dealers" – 4:09
7. "My Parents" – 5:48
8. "The Real Survivor" – 6:34
9. "Chicken or the Egg" – 8:40
10. "Our Leader" – 7:33
11. "What’s Wrong with America" – 3:44
