= Nothing's Sacred (book) =

2005 autobiography by Lewis Black

- Editor: Hank Gallo
- Author: Lewis Black
- Publisher: Simon Spotlight Entertainment
- Publication date: 2005 (Hardcover); 2006 (Paperback, Audiobook)
- Pages: 217

Nothing's Sacred is the autobiography of comedian Lewis Black. It was published in 2005, and republished in 2006 (paperback edition). The 2006 publication contains new material and one of the plays he wrote during his career as a playwright. The book has also been released in unabridged audio CD format, narrated by Black himself. The book is narrated in the same fashion as Black's stand-up routines, with explicit language, sarcasm, and constant fits of rage.

The book primarily accounts Lewis' admiration for his seemingly eccentric family, his disregard for authority, his education, past habitual drug use, his perspectives on current issues, and other real-life events such as his hitchhiking trip in Europe or his late pet dog, John-John. The book's layout is in semi-chronological order. The book has no table of contents and a lengthy page of acknowledgments.

== See also ==
- The Parts That Were Left Out of the Kennedy Book
