= Urban Design Group =

Urban Design Group (UDG) was a professional architectural, interior, planning and urban design services firm with studios in Atlanta, Chicago, Georgia, and Dallas, Texas.

== Organizational background ==
Urban Design Group was founded in 1975, by John M. Novack Jr., after leaving his position as design director at C. F. Murphy Associates of Chicago. The organization grew steadily, designing several urban projects, including Rivercenter in San Antonio, Texas; One Tabor Center in Denver, Colorado; Disney's Wilderness Lodge in Orlando, Florida; and Carlson Center in Minnetonka, Minnesota.

== Notable projects ==
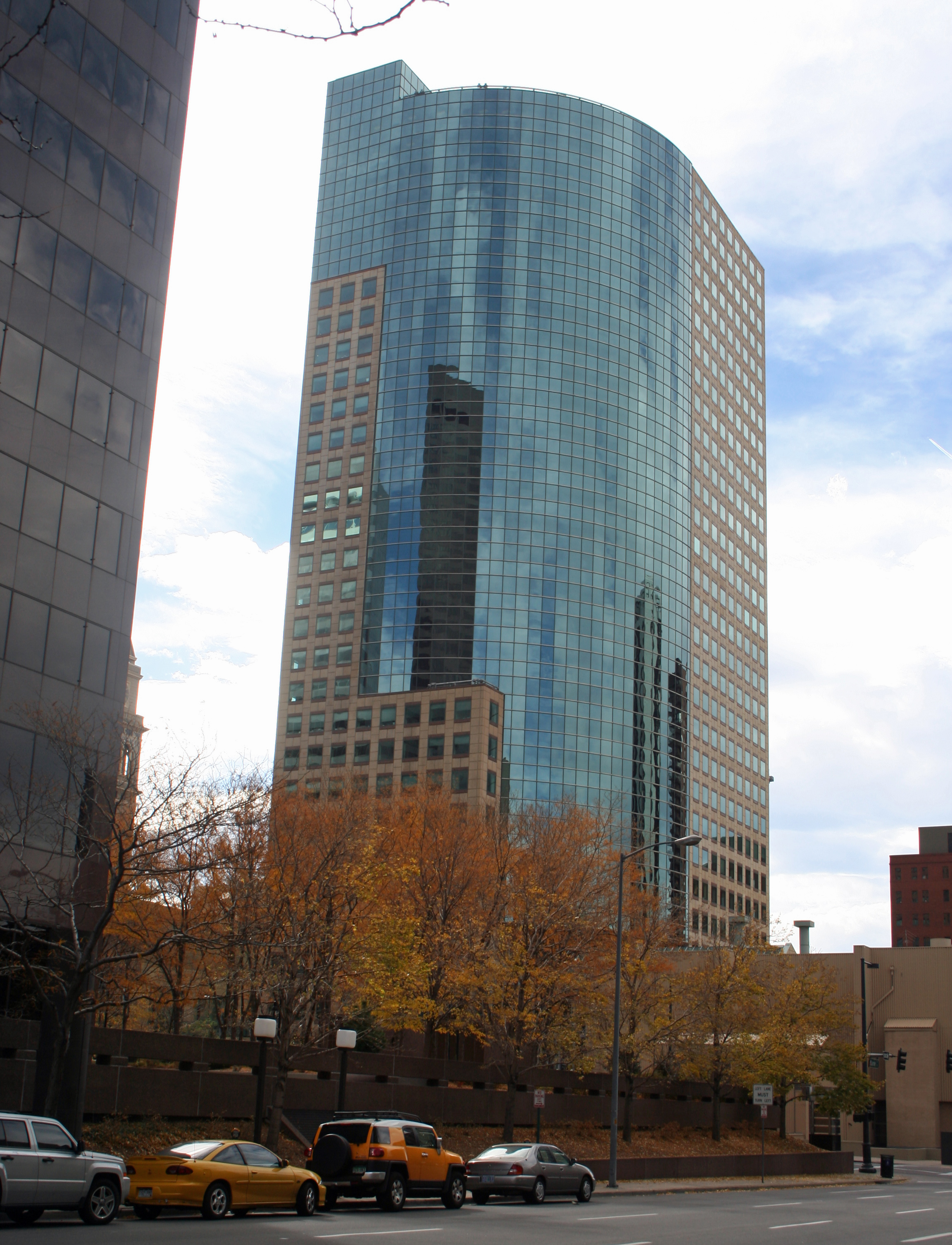
One Tabor Center, Denver, Colorado

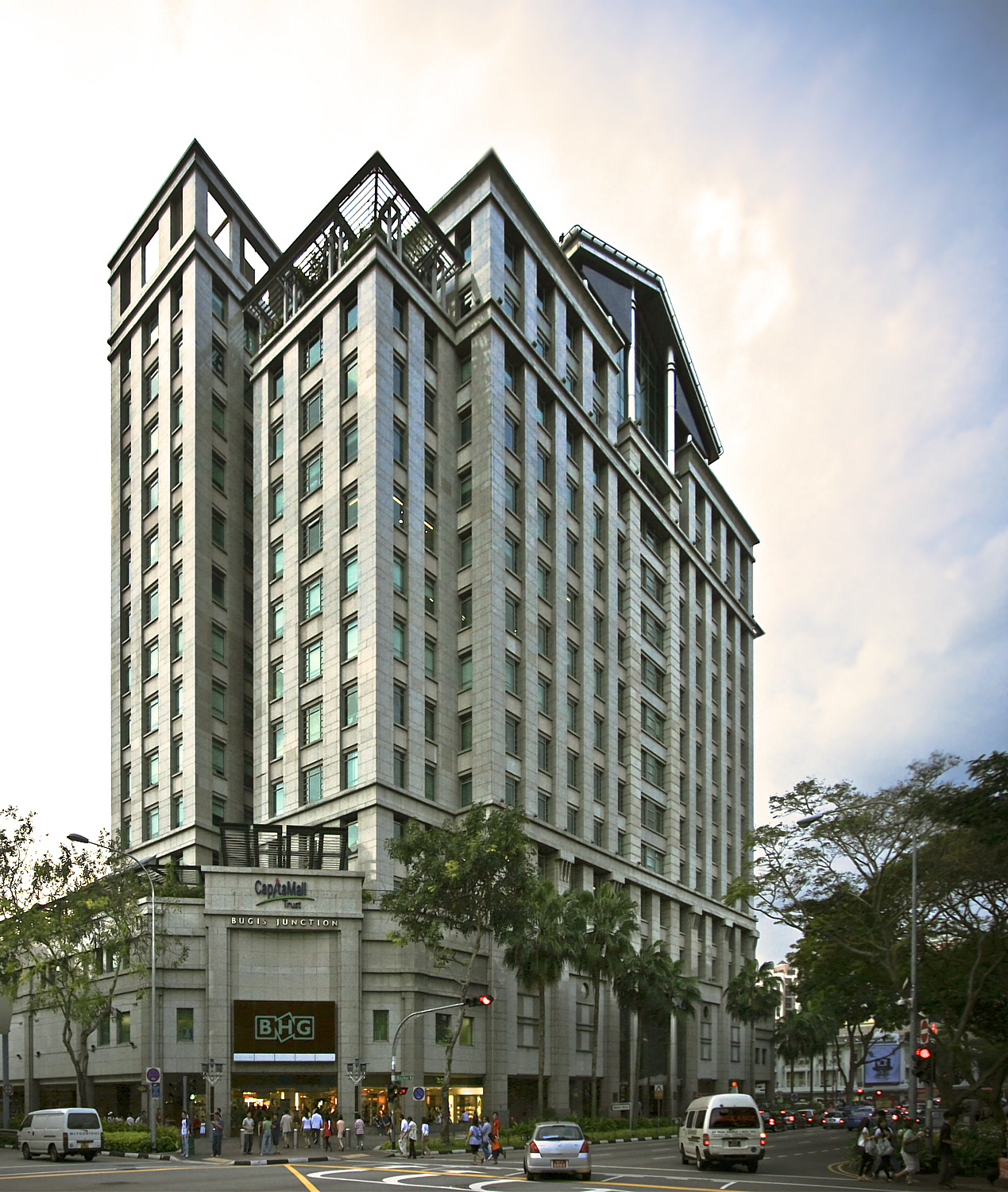
Bugis Junction, Singapore

- Amrit Touristic Development, Tartous District, Syria
- Animal Kingdom Lodge, Walt Disney World, Orlando, Florida
- Carlson Center, Minnetonka, Minnesota
- Cameron University Science Complex, Lawton, Oklahoma
- Castle Creek Lodge, Aspen, Colorado
- Convergence Center, Virginia Beach, Virginia
- Denver Dry Goods, Denver, Colorado
- Eagles Nest Ranch, Northeastern, Colorado
- E.M. Dirksen Federal Building: Phase III Renovation, Chicago, Illinois
- Fallen Oak Golf Clubhouse, Gulfport, Mississippi
- Four Winds New Buffalo, New Buffalo, Michigan
- Grand Californian, Disney's California Adventure, Anaheim, California
- Great Platte River Road Archway Monument, Kearney, Nebraska
- Galleria 400, Atlanta, Georgia
- Grand Bear Golf Clubhouse, Gulfport, Mississippi
- Hollywood Slots at Bangor, Maine
- Hollywood Casino at Penn National, Grantville, Pennsylvania
- International Baptist Theological Seminary, Prague, Czech Republic
- Law Offices/Crawford Hill Mansion, Denver, Colorado
- Nakheel Design Summit, Dubai, United Arab Emirates
- OCT Yantian Eco Park and Resort, Shenzhen, China
- One Ten Broadway, San Antonio, Texas
- Opera Galleria, Fort Collins, Colorado
- Quartz Mountain Arts and Conference Center, Lone Wolf, Oklahoma
- Philbrook Museum of Art, Tulsa, Oklahoma
- Preston Ridge I & II, Alpharetta, Georgia
- Rivercenter, San Antonio, Texas
- Silver Legacy, Reno, Nevada
- Sinclair Cabin, Montrose County, Colorado
- Sogang University Graduate School of Business, Seoul, Korea
- Tabor Center, Denver, Colorado
- Tramway Renovation, Denver, Colorado
- Tulsa Community College West Campus Tulsa, Oklahoma
- Tulsa Union Depot (1980), Tulsa, Oklahoma
- University of Southern California School of Cinematic Arts, Los Angeles, California
- United Artist Theatres, Bugis Junction, Singapore
- United Artist Theatres, Shatin, Hong Kong
- Wilderness Resort, Walt Disney World, Orlando, Florida
- Windward Fairways I and II, Atlanta, Georgia

== Gallery ==
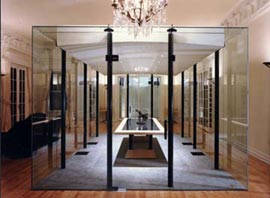
Law Office/Crawford Hill Mansion, Denver, Colorado

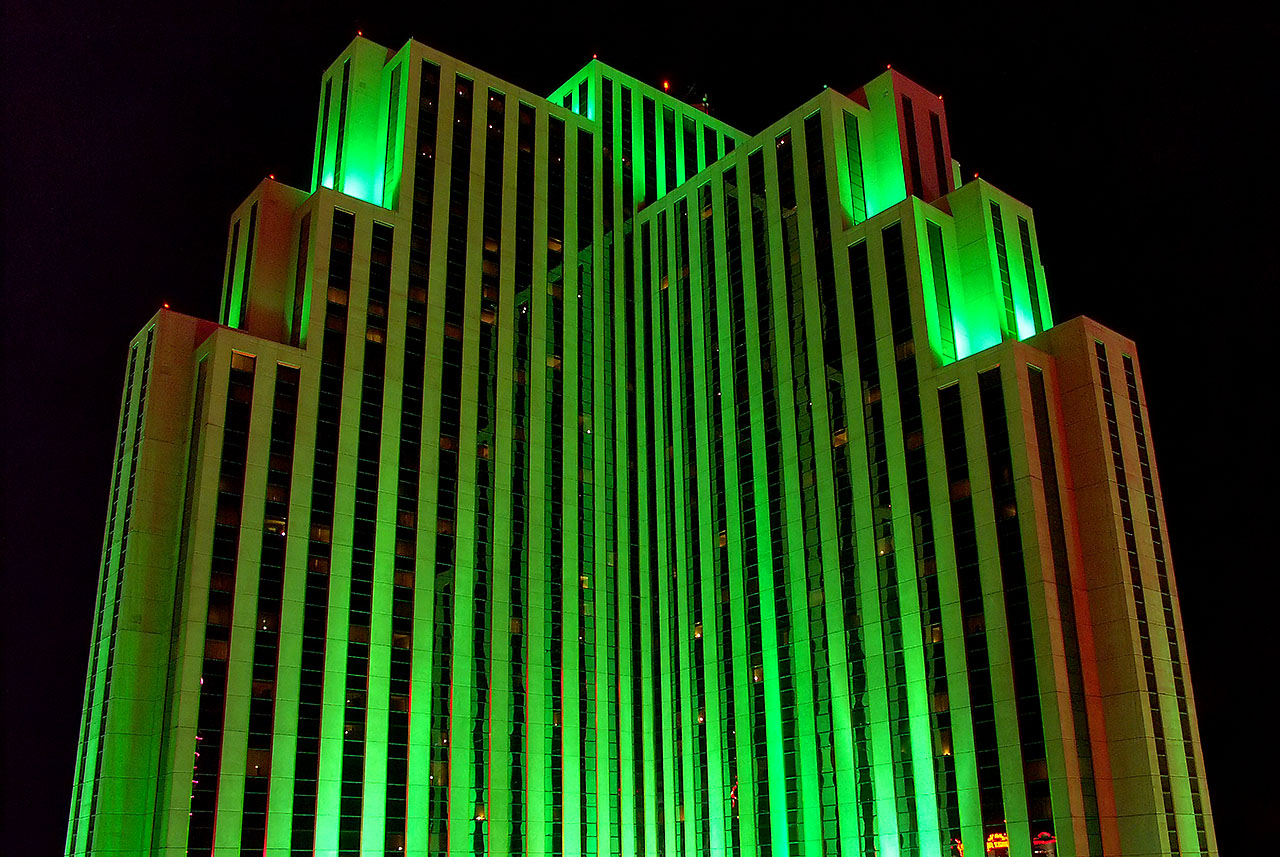
Silver Legacy Resort Casino, Reno, Nevada

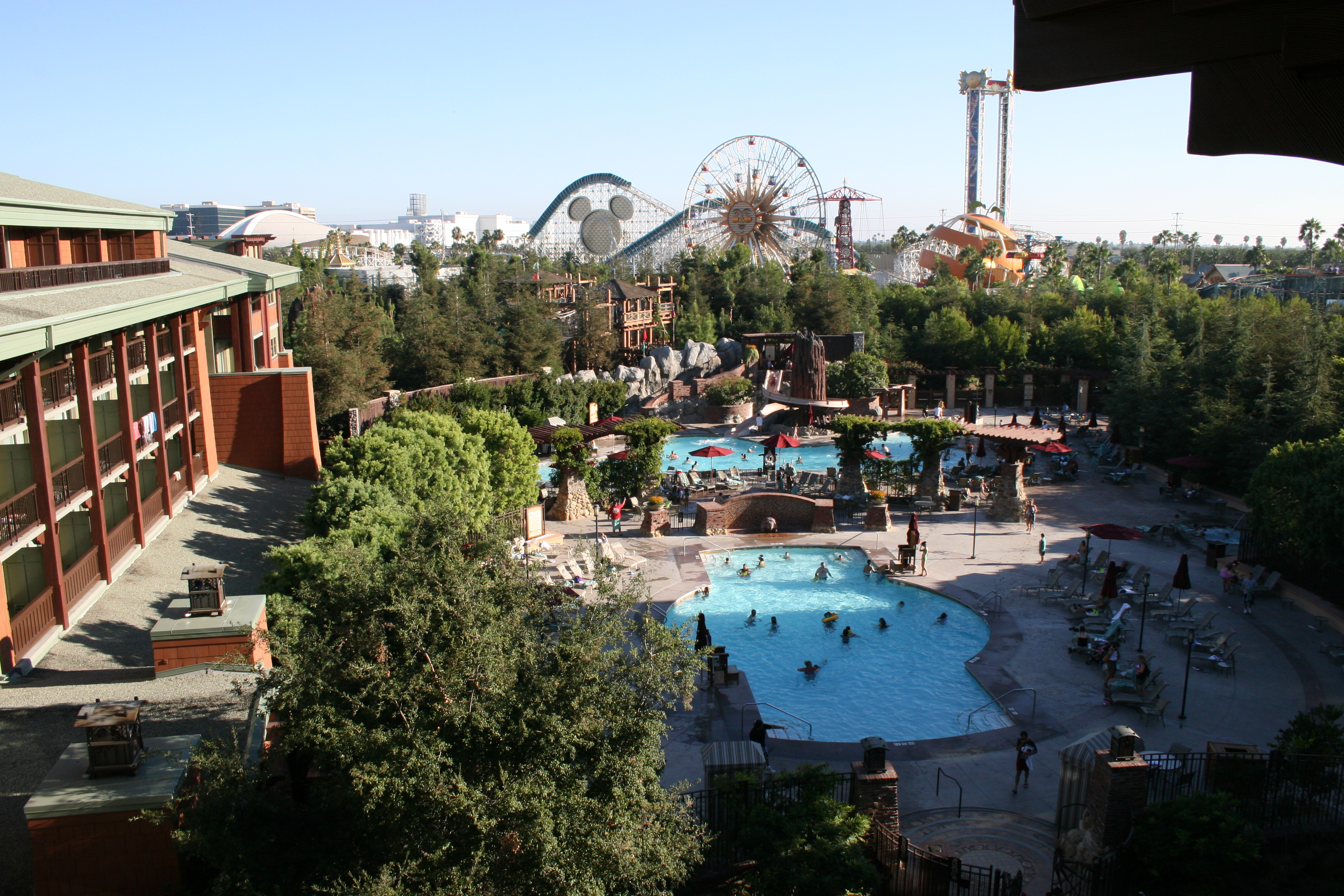
California Adventure, Anaheim, California

Rivercenter, San Antonio, Texas

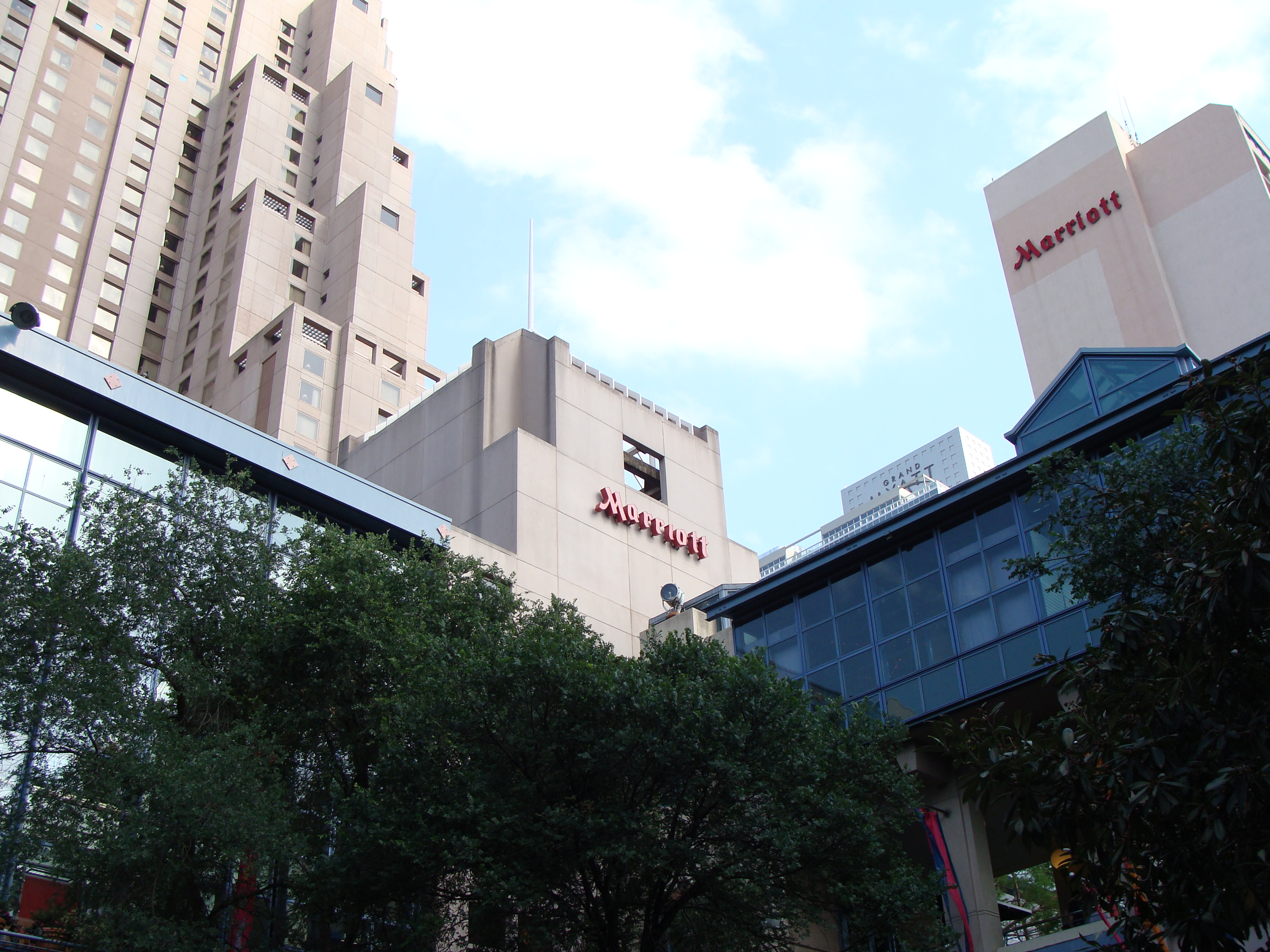
Rivercenter, San Antonio, Texas
