= Black on Broadway =

Black on Broadway is a 2004 HBO stand-up comedy special by Lewis Black. In it Black discusses topics such as George W. Bush, bottled water, and the 2004 winter. He apparently said the word "fuck" 78 times, but was informed that the number was 42: this arose when the Kennedy Center wanted him to do Red White & Screwed there, but required him to tone down his language.

== CD format ==
1. Intro - 2:12
2. Coldest Weather Ever! - 6:09
3. Jobs - 4:32
4. Water - 5:47
5. Milk - 6:21
6. School Attack - 4:12
7. Outro - 1:09

== Information on the CD ==
- Artist - Lewis Black
- Genre - Comedy
- Length - 50:40
- Released - 2004 (limited CD)

== External reviews ==
- Variety.com: Review by Brian Lowry
- DVD Verdict: Reviewed by Judge Sandra Dozier
- CurrentFilm.com: DVD review^{[usurped]}
