= Adam Dubin =

American filmmaker

Adam C. Dubin (born January 10, 1964) is an American filmmaker who co-directed the Beastie Boys music videos "(You Gotta) Fight for Your Right (To Party!)" and "No Sleep till Brooklyn" with Ric Menello. "Fight for Your Right" is number three on MTV's all time funniest music videos. In 2007, Fuse interviewed Dubin when it aired a 30-minute episode about "Fight for Your Right" as part of their series Videos That Rocked the World.

A graduate of the NYU film program, Dubin was roommates at NYU with record producer Rick Rubin.

Dubin directed A Year and a Half in the Life of Metallica feature-length documentary for heavy metal band Metallica and their music video "Nothing Else Matters". Dubin has directed several short comedy films with comedians Lewis Black and Jim Norton.

In 2009, Dubin directed the concert film Stark Raving Black starring comedian Lewis Black. In 2012, he directed the concert film In God We Rust, also starring Black. In 2013, Dubin directed the documentary film Hit The Lights: The Making of Metallica Through the Never, starring Metallica and actor Dane DeHaan.
