= Four Winds Hartford =

Casino in Hartford, Michigan

- Interactive map of Four Winds Hartford
- Location: 68600 Red Arrow Highway Hartford, Michigan 49057; 42.20204°N 86.21243°W
- Opened: August 30, 2011
- Gaming space: 52,000 square feet (4,800 m^{2})
- Casino type: Land-based
- Owner: Pokagon Band of Potawatomi Indians
- Architect: Hnedak Bobo Group
- Website: Official website

Four Winds Hartford is a 52,000-square-foot (4,800 m^{2}) casino in Hartford, Michigan that opened on August 30, 2011. It is one of the Four Winds Casinos, which are all owned and operated by the Pokagon Band of Potawatomi Indians.

The design of the casino was inspired by the traditions of the Potawatomi people.

== History ==
The casino opened on August 30, 2011, after 14 months of design and construction. It was the second Four Winds casino opened by the Pokagon Band. The original project cost US$40,000,000 (equivalent to $57,248,521 in 2025) and was designed by Hnedak Bobo Group.

== Gaming ==
The 52,000-square-foot (4,800 m^{2}) gaming floor features over 550 slot machines and nine table games, including blackjack, poker, and roulette. The Four Winds Casinos loyalty program, the W Club, is in use at this property.

== Dining ==
The casino includes a 74-seat restaurant with an attached 15-seat bar.

== See also ==
- List of casinos in Michigan
