= Stark Raving Black =

- Theatrical Release Poster
- Written by: Lewis Black
- Directed by: Adam Dubin
- Starring: Lewis Black
- Country of origin: United States
- Original language: English

Production
- Producers: Jack Gulick; Benjamin Brewer
- Editor: Christine Mitsogiorgakis
- Running time: 80 minutes

Original release
- Release: October 8, 2009

Stark Raving Black is a stand-up comedy film starring Lewis Black and directed by Adam Dubin. The 80 minute show was filmed in HD and 5.1 Surround Sound in Detroit, Michigan at The Fillmore Detroit on August 2, 2009. In the film, Black discusses politics and current events from the state of the economy to alternative energy. The DVD has 70 minutes of unedited and uncensored content, which is 40 minutes more than the television special.

== Album ==
Stark Raving Black

Live album by Lewis Black
- Released: June 15, 2010
- Recorded: The Filmore, Detroit, August 2, 2009
- Genre: Comedy
- Length: 1:17:17
- Label: Comedy Central Records
- Producer: Jack Vaughn Jr.

Lewis Black chronology
Anticipation (2008)	Stark Raving Black (2010)	The Prophet (2011)

Stark Raving Black is the seventh album by comedian Lewis Black, released through Comedy Central Records. Containing the audio of a concert stand-up special of the same name. The album was awarded the 2011 Grammy Award for Best Comedy Album.

=== Track listing ===
1. "Expectations" – 4:52
2. "Democrats & Republicans" – 3:26
3. "Mainstream Comedian" – 1:43
4. "Vince Gill, Amy Grant, & Me" – 12:03
5. "Hitting 60" – 5:30
6. "Birth & Death" – 8:49
7. "Parents" – 9:07
8. "The Economy" – 5:36
9. "Greed" – 9:04
10. "Alternative Energy" – 4:27
11. "Hope" – 12:40
