= Pokagon Band of Potawatomi Indians =

Tribe of Native Americans

Pokégnek Bodéwadmik

Total population
- c. 5,660 as of 2019

Regions with significant populations
- Michigan & Indiana

Languages
- English, Potawatomi

Religion
- Christianity Roman Catholic, traditional tribal religion

The Pokagon Band of Potawatomi Indians (Potawatomi: Pokégnek Bodéwadmik) is a federally recognized Potawatomi-speaking tribe based in southwestern Michigan and northeastern Indiana. Tribal government functions are located in Dowagiac, Michigan. They occupy reservation lands in a total of ten counties in the area.

The Pokagon are descendants of the residents of allied Potawatomi villages that were historically located along the St. Joseph, Paw Paw and Kalamazoo rivers in what are now southwest Michigan and northern Indiana. They were one of few Potawatomi bands to successfully resist removal by the United States government in the 1830s. The tribe has been federally recognized since 1994 legislation affirmed its status; it has established self-government.

== History ==
Some believe the Potawatomi originated as a people along the Atlantic coastline at the mouth of the St. Lawrence River. Archaeologists say they migrated south from Ontario about 1,000 years ago. Other tribal elders, including Michael Williams, told that Potawatomi originated at the mouth of the Grand River at its mouth at Lake Michigan or along the St. Joseph River near Mishawaka, Indiana. Some followers believe over centuries, along with the Ojibwe and Odawa Anishinaabe peoples, they migrated west to the Great Lakes region some 500–800 years ago in a "Great Migration."

The Pokagon Band of Potawatomi Indians were party to 11 treaties with the federal government, with the major land cession being under the 1833 Treaty of Chicago. During the Indian removals, many Potawatomi bands were moved west, but Chief Leopold Pokagon negotiated to keep his Potawatomi band of 280 people in southwestern Michigan. They were the only Potawatomi band from Michigan that did not remove west of the Mississippi River.

Under the Indian Reorganization Act of 1934, the Pokagon Band wanted to restore self-government and requested recognition as a tribe by the Department of the Interior, but were denied because of conditions of their treaties and the legislation. After years of petitioning, the Pokagon Band regained recognition in 1994 through legislation affirming their status.

== Contemporary ==
=== Casinos ===
As a federally recognized tribe, the Pokagon Band were able to develop and open in 2007 the Four Winds New Buffalo casino on the Pokagon Reservation. It is located in New Buffalo Township, near New Buffalo, Michigan. The casino is operated in accordance with the Indian Gaming Regulatory Act and a compact with Michigan. It expanded in 2011 due to its success. The Chicago Tribune reported that if the casino were on the Las Vegas Strip, it would be the second largest there. Architecturally the casino's rotunda is built in the style of the Potawatomi people's traditional lodges. A second, satellite casino, Four Winds Hartford, opened in 2011 in Hartford, Michigan. The tribe opened a third, Four Winds Dowagiac, in 2013 in Dowagiac, Michigan. The band has been limited to three casinos by its 2008 compact with the state of Michigan. In 2018 the tribe opened Four Winds South Bend in South Bend, Indiana, which it has claimed qualifies for gaming pursuant to specific provisions of the Indian Gaming Regulatory Act.

In February 2021, the Pokagon Band of Potawatomi Indians announced the rollout of its online gaming platform, making it the 11th licensee to offer both online sports betting and casino gaming in Michigan.

The tribe has invested revenues from gaming in building needed housing and plans a community center. In a competition for federal stimulus funds, the Pokagon were granted $2 million from the Department of Housing and Urban Development to build a planned community center at their tribal center in Dowagiac. The 8,500-square-foot (790 m^{2}) building has been designed to satisfy Silver LEED standards, and incorporates a number of innovations to reduce its energy use and create a sustainable building: including a green roof, thick concrete flooring to act as a heat sink, windows to the south to gain winter sun and heat, and geothermal systems.

=== Land ===
In 2018 the Field Museum in Chicago, which stands on Pokagon land, included a tribal member in its advisory committee of scholars and museum professionals. The committee is tasked with informing the transformation of the Native North American Hall to incorporate perspectives and voices of Native peoples and Indigenous nations.

=== Language ===
A decreasing number of elders among the Potawatomi bands speak the language, but the Pokagon are participating in a program to restore teaching and use of the language: See Potawatomi language § Language revitalization.

== Tribal government ==
Members of the tribal council, including the chairman, are elected by members of the tribe. By their positions, they also serve as members of the Pokagon Gaming Authority.

=== Tribal Court ===
The Tribal Judiciary is a separate and independent branch of the Pokagon Band government. The Tribal Court Judiciary consists of the Chief Judge, one Associate Judge, and three Appellate Court Justices. All members of the Judiciary are appointed by the Tribal Council to serve staggered four (4)-year terms.

=== Tribal Police ===
The Pokagon Tribal Police Department was established in 2003 to provide direct law enforcement services to the tribal members and visitors in the ten-county tribal geographic boundaries in Michigan and Indiana. The Pokagon Tribal Police Department is a full-service police department, servicing all areas within the Tribe's jurisdiction. The Tribal Police are charged with enforcing federal, state, and local laws, including the Pokagon Band Code of Offenses.

=== Gaming Commission ===
The Pokagon Band Gaming Commission was established the in 2007 as an independent subdivision. The Gaming Commission regulates all gaming conducted within Pokagon Band jurisdiction under the Gaming Regulatory Act, the federal Indian Gaming Regulatory Act, and the tribal-state Gaming Compact between the Band and the State of Michigan and Indiana.

== See also ==
- Leopold Pokagon
- Simon Pokagon
