= Four Winds New Buffalo =

Casino and hotel in the United States

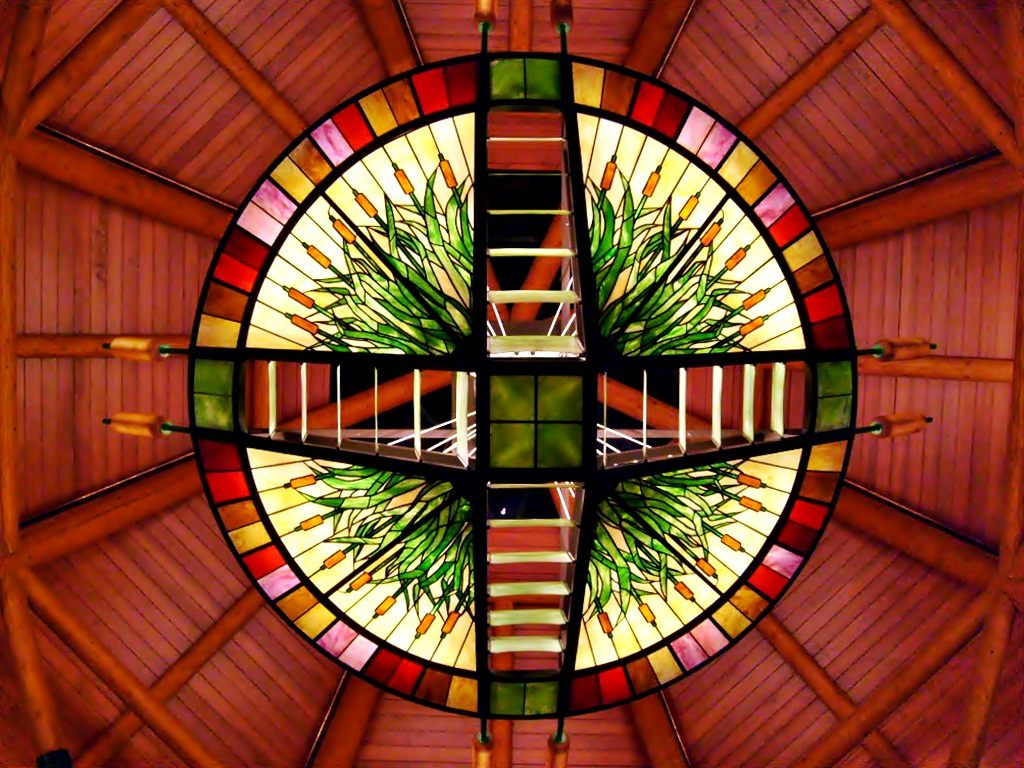
- Stained glass entryway of Four Winds New Buffalo in March 2008
- Interactive map of Four Winds New Buffalo
- Location: 11111 Wilson Road New Buffalo Township, Michigan 49117; 41.77006°N 86.72340°W
- Opened: August 2, 2007
- No. of rooms: 415
- Gaming space: 130,000 square feet (12,000 m^{2})
- Notable restaurants: Kankakee Grille, Copper Rock Steakhouse, Timbers
- Casino type: Land-based
- Owner: Pokagon Band of Potawatomi Indians
- Architect: Urban Design Group
- Website: Official website

Four Winds New Buffalo is a casino, hotel and entertainment venue located in New Buffalo Township, Michigan, near New Buffalo, which opened on August 2, 2007. It is the primary property of Four Winds Casinos, which are all owned and operated by the Pokagon Band of Potawatomi Indians.

Architecturally the casino's rotunda is built in the style of the Potawatomi people's traditional lodges.

In March 2015, USA Today named it one of the ten best casinos located outside of Las Vegas.

== History ==
Four Winds New Buffalo was first planned in May 1996. The original project was designed by Urban Design Group and cost approximately US$180,000,000 (equivalent to $279,489,649 in 2025). It expanded in 2011 due to its success, adding 250 hotel rooms and a multi-purpose facility.

== Gaming ==
The 130,000-square-foot (12,000 m^{2}) gaming floor features over 3,000 slot machines and over 60 table games featuring games such as blackjack, craps, poker, and roulette. The Four Winds Casinos loyalty program, the W Club, is in use at this property. In 2021 the Michigan Gaming Control Board gave approval to the Pokagon to begin online and sports betting in all three Four Winds casino locations.

== Dining ==
The casino includes several dining establishments, including the Kankakee Grille, Timbers Deli, and the Copper Rock Steakhouse.

== Hotel ==
The facility includes a 416-room hotel. It originally opened with 165, and 251 rooms were added in 2012.

== Entertainment ==
=== Silver Creek Event Center ===
The Silver Creek Event Center is an event and concert venue at the casino. Opened in July 2012, the center has featured performers such as Diana Ross, Gregg Allman, Colbie Caillat, B.B. King, Peter Cetera, Michael Bolton, Sammy Hagar, Foreigner, Huey Lewis & the News, Frankie Valli, Jackie Evancho, ZZ Top, Gladys Knight, Heart, Sharon Resultan, Kenny Loggins, Jay Leno, Eric Burdon, Joan Jett and the Blackhearts, Patti LaBelle, and Frank Sinatra, Jr. On March 13, 2020 Lewis Black recorded his stand-up comedy special Thanks For Risking Your Life live at The Silver Creek Event Center.

== Shopping ==
The facility includes limited shopping, including a Hard Rock Cafe Rock Shop, a gift shop, a clothing store, and a boutique featuring Landau, Michal Negrin, and Boccelli merchandise.

== See also ==
- Four Winds Casinos
- List of casinos in Michigan
