= Four Winds Dowagiac =

Casino in the United States

- Interactive map of Four Winds Dowagiac
- Location: 58700 M-51 South Dowagiac, Michigan 49047; 41.97836°N 86.13194°W
- Opened: April 30, 2013
- Gaming space: 12,000 square feet (1,100 m^{2})
- Casino type: Land-based
- Owner: Pokagon Band of Potawatomi Indians
- Website: Official website

Four Winds Dowagiac is a 27,000-square-foot (2,500 m^{2}) casino in Dowagiac, Michigan which opened on April 30, 2013. It is one of the Four Winds Casinos, which are all owned and operated by the Pokagon Band of Potawatomi Indians.

The design of the casino was inspired by the traditions of the Potawatomi people.

== Gaming ==
The 12,000-square-foot (1,100 m^{2}) gaming floor features 404 slot machines and seven table games: 21+3 and Lucky Lucky Bonus Blackjack, High Card Flush, Mississippi Stud, and Roulette. The Four Winds Casinos loyalty program, the W Club, is in use at this property. In 2021 the Michigan Gaming Control Board gave approval to the Pokagon to begin online and sports betting in all three Four Winds casino locations.

== Dining ==
The casino includes a 30-seat restaurant with an attached 15 seat bar.

== See also ==
- Four Winds Casinos
- List of casinos in Michigan
