= Red Arrow Highway =

The Red Arrow Highway name applies to highways named for the 32nd Infantry Division of the United States Army that used a red arrow as its insignia. These highways include:

- The former route of U.S. Route 12 in Michigan as dedicated in 1952, including segments of the former highway in Berrien and Van Buren counties that still bear the name;
- Wisconsin Highway 32 across the state of Wisconsin.
