= Four Winds Casinos =

American gambling business in Michigan and Indiana

Four Winds Casinos and hotel
- Industry: Gambling
- Headquarters: New Buffalo, Michigan, United States
- Area served: Midwestern United States
- Owner: Pokagon Band of Potawatomi Indians
- Website: www.fourwindscasino.com

The Four Winds Casinos are a set of casinos located in the states of Indiana and Michigan in the United States. The casinos are owned by the Pokagon Band of Potawatomi Indians. The primary property is located in New Buffalo Township, Michigan, with satellite locations in Hartford, Michigan; Dowagiac, Michigan; and South Bend, Indiana.

== History ==
In 2007, as a federally recognized tribe, the Pokagon Band were able to develop the Four Winds New Buffalo on the Pokagon Reservation, in New Buffalo Township in accordance with the Indian Gaming Regulatory Act and a compact with Michigan. A second, satellite casino, Four Winds Hartford, opened on August 30, 2011, and a third, Four Winds Dowagiac, opened April 30, 2013.

The band was limited to three casinos by its 2008 compact with the state of Michigan. It has since constructed a casino on lands that it claimed qualified for gaming pursuant to specific provisions of the Indian Gaming Regulatory Act, in South Bend, Indiana. The band announced plans in 2012 to build this 164-acre "tribal village", which includes housing, healthcare, and government facilities, and a casino and hotel. Four Winds South Bend opened January 16, 2018. In 2022, the South Bend location expanded to 98,000 square feet and features 1900 slot machines on its gaming floor, the most in Indiana. Four Winds South Bend's hotel, the second-tallest building in South Bend, opened March 1, 2023.

== Properties ==
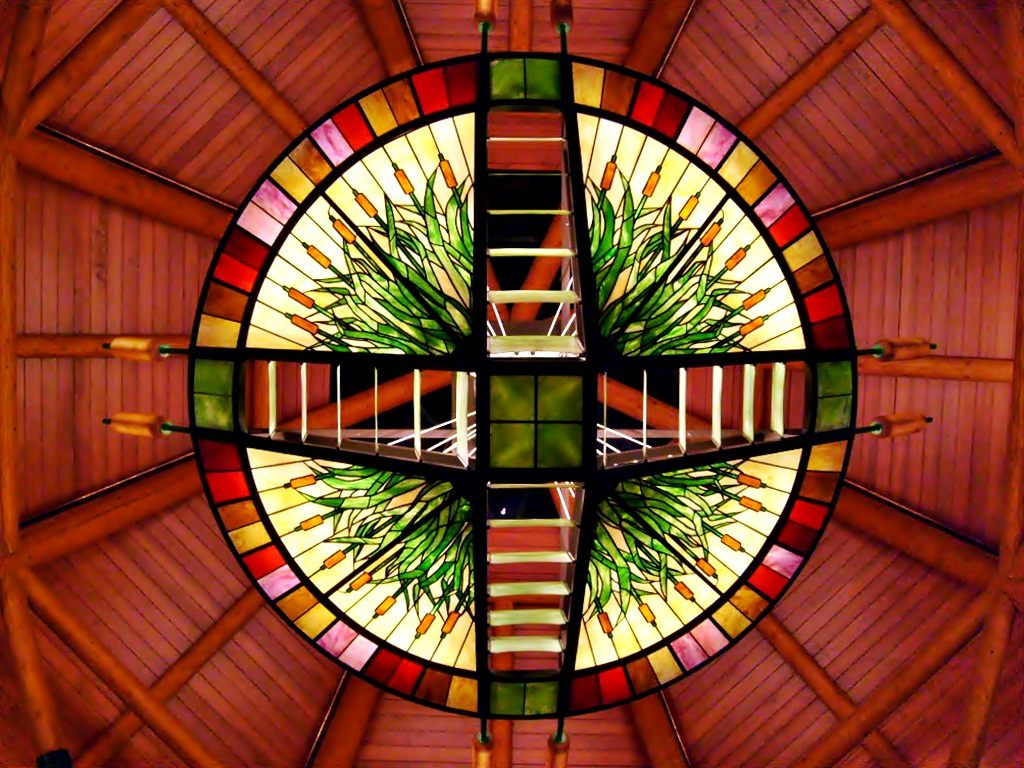
Stained glass entryway of Four Winds New Buffalo in March 2008

Four Winds Casinos includes these properties:

Name	Location	Opened	Notes
Four Winds New Buffalo	New Buffalo Township, Michigan	August 2, 2007	
Four Winds Hartford	Hartford, Michigan	August 30, 2011	
Four Winds Dowagiac	Dowagiac, Michigan	April 30, 2013	
Four Winds South Bend	South Bend, Indiana	January 16, 2018	

== Marketing ==
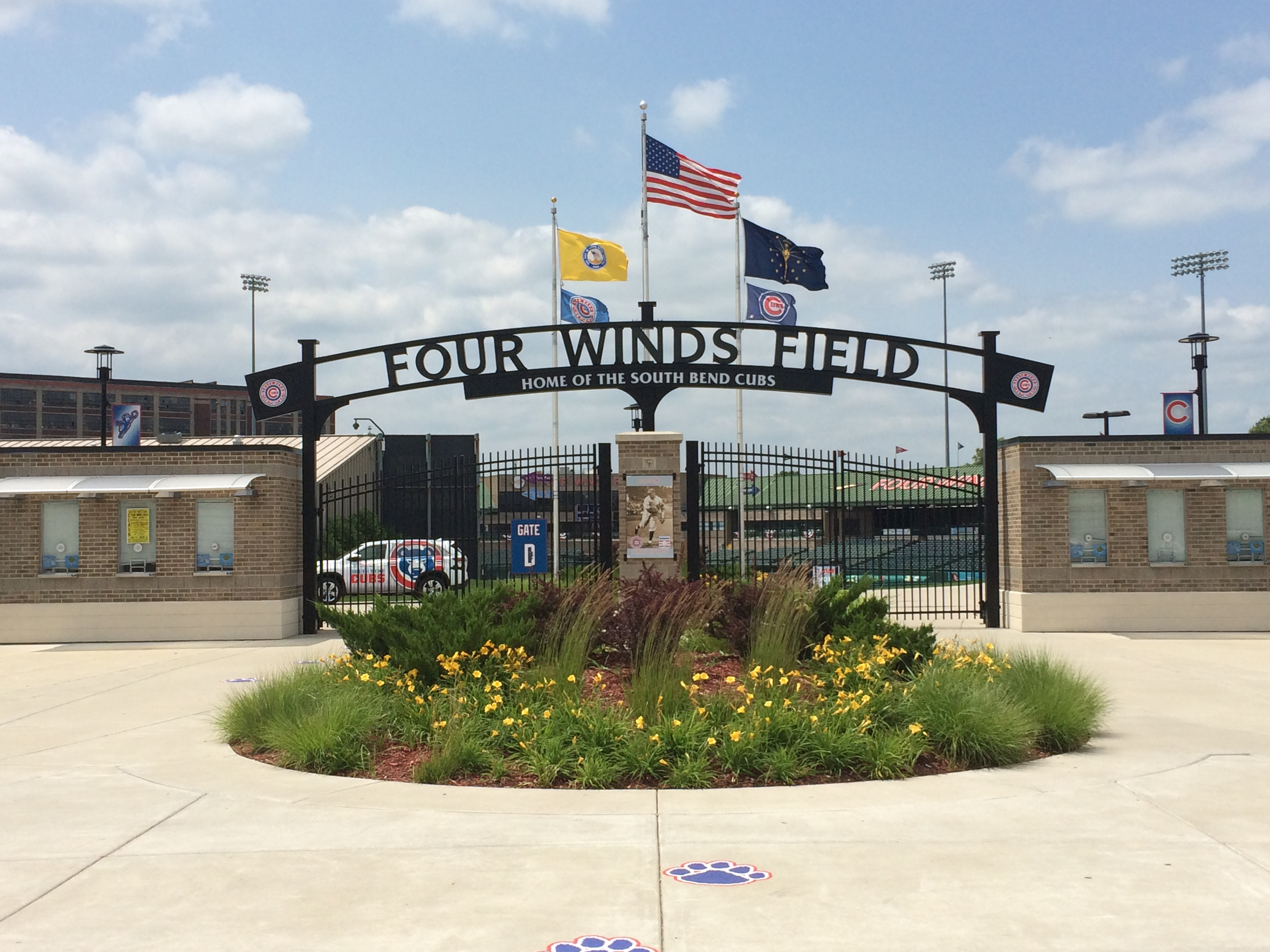
Entrance to Four Winds Field at Coveleski Stadium in July 2015

The casinos utilize a loyalty program, known as the W♣ Players Club or simply the W Club.

On September 5, 2013, a ten-year naming agreement between the casinos and what became known as the Four Winds Field at Coveleski Stadium was announced.

== See also ==
- Gambling in Indiana
- List of casinos in Michigan
