= Lewis Black =

American comedian and actor (born 1948)

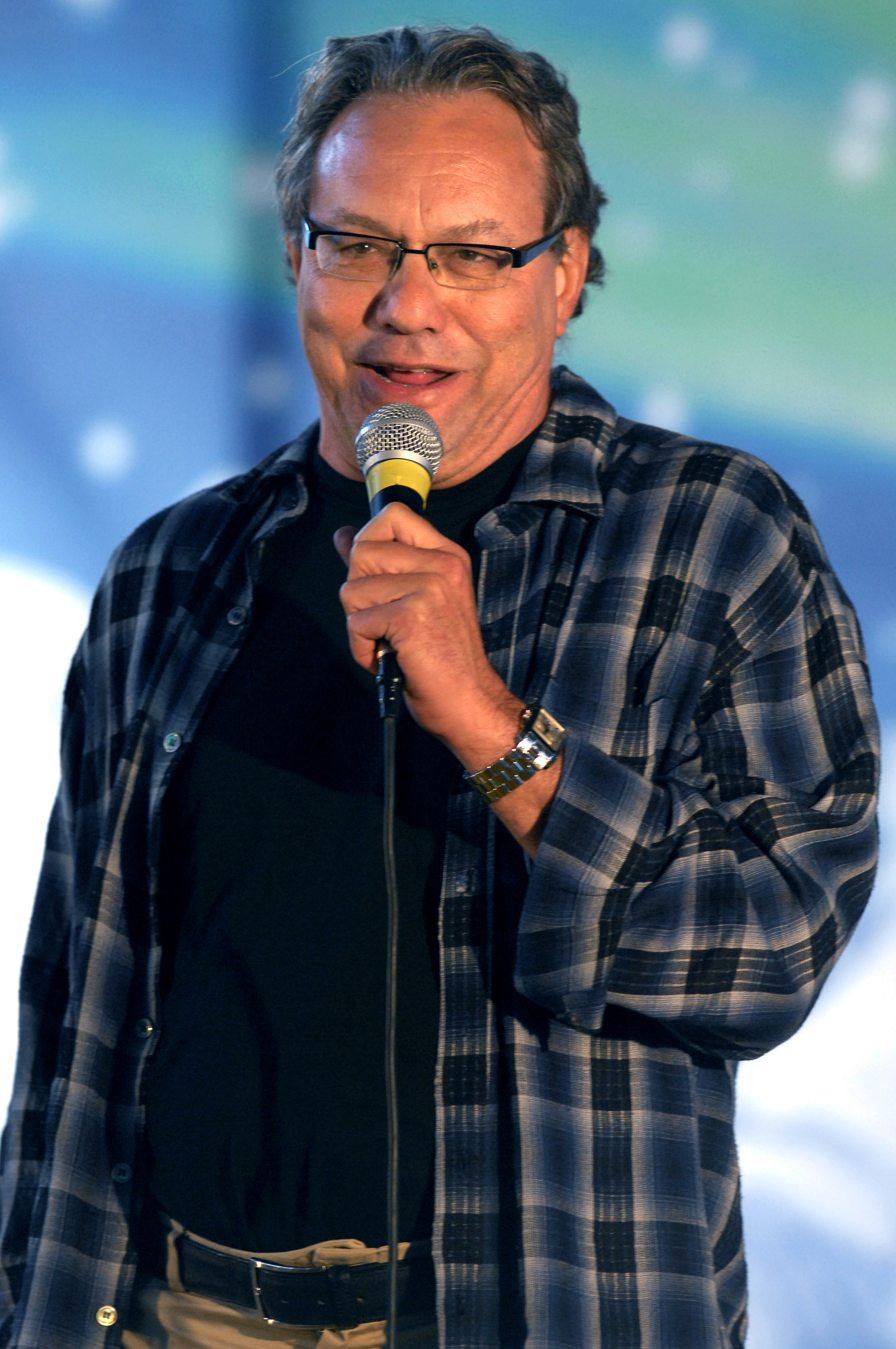
- Black at Aviano Air Base in 2007
- Born: Lewis Niles Black; August 30, 1948 (age 78); Silver Spring, Maryland, U.S.
- Education: University of North Carolina at Chapel Hill (BA); Yale University (MFA)
- Occupations: Stand-up comedian; actor

Comedy career
- Years active: 1970–present
- Medium: Film; stand-up; television
- Genres: Black comedy; news satire; observational comedy; political satire
- Subjects: American culture; American politics; current events; pop culture
- Website: lewisblack.com

Lewis Niles Black (born August 30, 1948) is an American stand-up comedian and actor. His comedy routines often escalate into angry rants about history, politics, religion and cultural trends.

He hosted the Comedy Central series Lewis Black's Root of All Evil and makes regular appearances on The Daily Show delivering his "Back in Black" commentary segment, which he has been doing since 1996, when The Daily Show was hosted by Craig Kilborn. He was voted 51st of the 100 greatest stand-up comedians of all time by Comedy Central in 2004 and was voted 5th in Comedy Central's Stand Up Showdown in 2008 and 11th in 2010. In 2015, he appeared as the voice of Anger in the Pixar film Inside Out, a role he reprises in the 2024 sequel.

Lewis Black is also a spokesman for the Aruba Tourism Authority, appearing in television ads that first aired in late 2009 and 2010. He has served as an "ambassador for voting rights" for the American Civil Liberties Union since 2013. Since 2022, he has also been on the board of directors of the Kurt Vonnegut Museum and Library. He had been an honorary member of the board for about 10 years before that.

When not on the road performing, Black resides in Manhattan but also maintains a residence in Chapel Hill, North Carolina.

== Early life ==
Lewis Black was born on August 30, 1948, in Washington, D.C., the elder son of Jeannette Black (née Kaplan; 1918–2022), a teacher, and Samuel Black (1918–2019), an artist and mechanical engineer. He had a younger brother, Ronald, who died of cancer in 1997 at the age of 47.

He is Jewish and was raised in a middle-class Jewish family in the Burnt Mills neighborhood of Silver Spring, Maryland. His grandparents emigrated from Chornyi Ostriv in Ukraine and Białystok in Poland and his paternal grandfather was originally named Leib Blech, later changed to Louis Black. Black graduated from Springbrook High School in 1966.

Lewis Black recounts in his book Nothing's Sacred that he scored highly on the math section of his SAT exam and later applied to Yale, Princeton, Brown, Amherst, Williams and Georgetown. Every college he applied to except Georgetown rejected him, but by that point he had decided he did not want to go there, so he attended the University of Maryland, College Park for one year before transferring to the University of North Carolina at Chapel Hill. There, he studied playwriting and was a brother of Pi Lambda Phi International fraternity and a member of Student Congress. After graduating in 1970, Black moved to Colorado Springs with a group of performers based in Chapel Hill, purchased an old log cabin theater and attempted to establish a theater company. Calling themselves the Homestead Arts Theatre, the group performed regionally at parks, schools, and prisons, but were unable to open the theater due to code violations. He eventually returned to Washington where he worked at the Appalachian Regional Commission, wrote plays, and performed stand-up comedy at the Brickskeler in Dupont Circle.

He earned an MFA degree at the Yale School of Drama in 1977, and was married for ten months when he was 26 years old.

Black's career began in theater as a playwright; however, he has stated that he was always doing stand-up "on the side." He served as the playwright-in-residence and associate artistic director of Steve Olsen's West Bank Cafe Downstairs Theatre Bar in Hell's Kitchen in New York City, where he collaborated with composer and lyricist Rusty Magee and artistic director Rand Foerster on hundreds of one-act plays from 1981 to 1989. Also with Magee, Black wrote the musical The Czar of Rock and Roll, which premiered at Houston's Alley Theatre in 1990. Black's stand-up comedy began as an opening act for the plays; he was also the master of ceremonies. After a management change at the theater, Black left and began working as a comedian, as well as finding bit parts in television and films.

== Comedic style ==
Lewis Black lists his comedic influences as George Carlin, Lenny Bruce, Richard Pryor, Lily Tomlin, Bob Newhart, & Shelley Berman.

== Career ==
=== Stand-up comedy ===
In 1994, Black appeared on A&E's An Evening at the Improv.

In 1998, Black starred in his first comedy special on the series Comedy Central Presents. He starred in two additional episodes of the series in 2000 and 2002. He starred in another special for the network in 2002, titled Taxed Beyond Belief. In 2004 and 2005, Black hosted the World Stupidity Awards ceremony at Montreal's Just for Laughs comedy festival. In 2004, he had an HBO stand-up special titled Black on Broadway. Black hosted Comedy Central's Last Laugh '07, which aired on December 2, 2007, along with Dave Attell and D.L. Hughley.

In 2006, Black performed at the Warner Theatre in Washington, D.C. for an HBO special, Red, White, and Screwed. It aired in June and a DVD was released in October. When explaining his choice of venue, Black said that "some asshole" was paid to count the number of times the word "fuck" was said in his previous HBO special, Black On Broadway, and that the original location, the Kennedy Center, wanted him to cut back on its use. Black was told the number was 42, when actually it was approximately 78.

Black received a 2007 Grammy Award for "Best Comedy Album" for his album The Carnegie Hall Performance. He hosted the Comedy Central television series The Root of All Evil in 2008. The show pitted two people or pop-culture topics against each other as a panel of comedians argued, in the style of a court trial, which is more evil, e.g., "Paris Hilton vs. Dick Cheney" and "Internet Porn vs. YouTube". After hearing arguments from both sides, Black, acting as judge, made the final decision as to which is more evil. In 2008, Black hosted History of the Joke with Lewis Black, a 2-hour comedy-documentary on The History Channel.

Comedy Central's "Stand-Up Month" in 2008 featured specials originally presented on HBO by Black, along with programs featuring Dane Cook and Chris Rock. That year, as part of Comedy Central's "Stand-Up Month", Black's routine finished at #5 on "Stand-Up Showdown 2008", a viewer-based countdown of the top Comedy Central Presents routine. In 2009, Black filmed two shows at the Fillmore Theater in Detroit, Michigan. These were the basis for the concert film Stark Raving Black, which appeared in theaters for a limited time in October, and was released on video the next year. At the end of 2009, Black returned to the History Channel to host Surviving the Holidays with Lewis Black, in which he discussed the year-end pressures of Thanksgiving, Channukah, Christmas, and New Year's.

In 2011, Black filmed two shows at the State Theatre in Minneapolis, Minnesota. The shows were used for Black's comedy special In God We Rust. The special premiered on Epix HD. An extended and uncensored version of the special was released on DVD and Blu-ray on September 11, 2011.

In August 2013, Black recorded his ninth stand-up special Old Yeller: Live at the Borgata. Deadline reported that Black and the company that was releasing the stand-up special, Image Entertainment, would later air it in the form of pay-per-view and VOD, making it the first comedy special to air simultaneously on all cable, satellite and telco platforms.

In October 2020, Black released his fourteenth stand-up special, Thanks for Risking Your Life, live at the Four Winds New Buffalo casino. The special was filmed at the start of the COVID-19 lockdown and reflects that in material.

=== Film and television career ===
==== On the screen ====
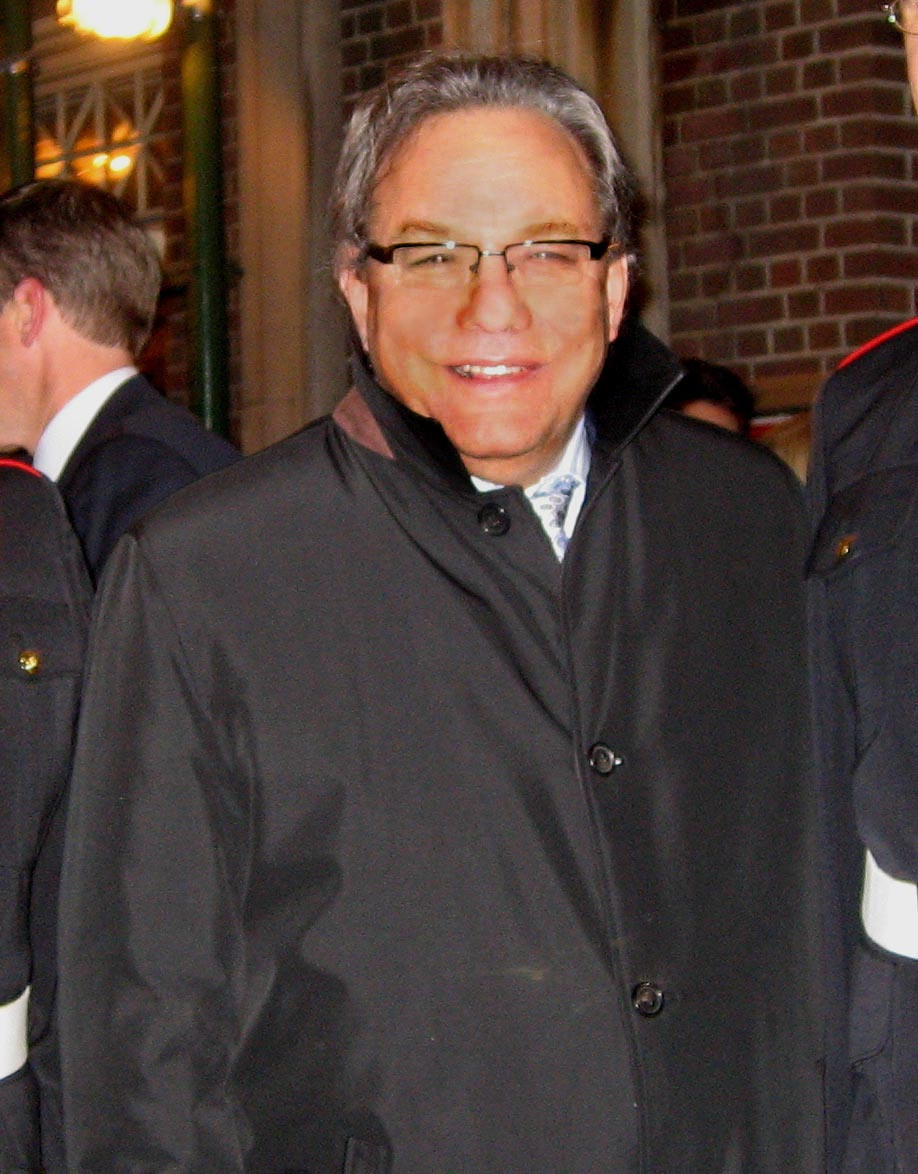
Black in 2007 at "Stand Up for Heroes"

Black appeared in episode 25 "Aria" (1991) of Law and Order as porn director Franklin Frome, Law & Order: Special Victims Unit episode "Obscene" (2004) as a shock jock, and in The Big Bang Theory episode "The Jiminy Conjecture" (2009) as Professor Crawley, an entomologist. He also released his autobiography, Nothing's Sacred, in 2005. Since November 9, 2005, Black has been making appearances in small segments on The Weather Channel. In December 2005, he appeared in an animated holiday special The Happy Elf, as the voice of the extremely tightly wound elf, Norbert.

In the film Accepted, a film about high school graduates who create a college when they fail to get accepted into any, he played Dean Ben Lewis of the school "South Harmon Institute of Technology". He also appeared in the 2006 films Man of the Year and Unaccompanied Minors. Black hosted Comedy Central's Last Laugh '06, which aired on December 10, 2006.

==== Voice ====
Black was the voice of "Manobrain" during the third season of the Cartoon Network series Duck Dodgers. He was the inventor of a diet pill which was stolen while he was in college. He blamed the theft on his college friend Dr. I. Q. Hi, not realizing that the actual thief was Duck Dodgers. The theft set Manobrain on the path of evil.

He provided the voice of the Deadly Duplicator in four episodes of the Adult Swim show Harvey Birdman, Attorney at Law and in the video game based on the show.

Black provided the voice of oxpecker Ted in the My Gym Partner's a Monkey episode, "Hornbill and Ted's Bogus Journey". The character is portrayed in the same fashion as his comedy shows, though without profanity. In addition, the bird's clothes, looks, and mannerisms resemble his.

He also voiced Mr. E/Ricky Owens in Scooby-Doo! Mystery Incorporated and for Teenage Mutant Ninja Turtles played a middle-aged man named Vic who is kidnapped by the Kraang and mutated into a spider-like monster called "Spider-Bytez" by Michelangelo.

Black voiced Anger in the Pixar films Inside Out and Inside Out 2.

He also guest starred as the voice of Santa Claus in the SpongeBob SquarePants episodes "Goons on the Moon", "SpongeBob's Road to Christmas" and would reprise the role in spinoff series Kamp Koral: SpongeBob's Under Years.

=== Tours ===
On June 18, 2007, he sat in with Southern rock/Jam band Gov't Mule at the 6th annual Bonnaroo music festival, where he had performed earlier that weekend, for what was to be a quick joke. A member of the audience threw a bottle at Black, which struck him. Black was upset and he encouraged the audience to boo the heckler before leaving the stage in disgust, while shouting obscenities at the heckler. This act was seen in an episode of Lewis Black's Root of All Evil titled "YouTube vs. simply".

On June 29, 2007, Black gave a benefit show at Springbrook High School, his alma mater, in the school's auditorium for 1,100 alumni, faculty, and students. He performed in his usual style, stopping at points to remark how good it felt to use that language on that particular stage. At the end of the show he was given a Springbrook football jersey, and cursed at one teacher for giving him a B and causing him not to graduate first in his class.

In mid-December 2007, Black went with Robin Williams, Kid Rock, Lance Armstrong and Rachel Smith, Miss USA 2007, on a United Service Organizations trip to support the troops in Iraq and Kuwait. The last show was on December 22 at the U.S Naval Station in Rota, Spain. In 2008, Black went on tour to promote his book Me of Little Faith. Black did a stand-up tour called "Let Them Eat Cake", with material from that tour being featured on his comedy album Anticipation. Beginning in January 2010, Black embarked on a new tour called "In God We Rust".

== Legal issues ==
In 2000, Black and fellow comedian Jim Norton were arrested for their involvement with "The Naked Teen Voyeur Bus", a specially designed bus with acrylic glass walls containing numerous 18- and 19-year-old topless women. This bus was driven around Manhattan while reports about it were broadcast on the Opie and Anthony radio show. The radio station management did not inform the O&A show that the bus's route was also the route that President Bill Clinton was using that day. Twenty-eight hours after their arrest, Black and Norton were released. Black appeared on The Daily Show the following night where he stated he was exercising his constitutional rights. He then joked that the location of this particular right was unclear, but that it was "between 'all men are created equal' and 'don't shit where you eat.'"

== Published works ==
- Nothing's Sacred (2005)
- Nothing's Sacred (audio book) (2006)
- Nothing's Sacred (softcover version) (2007)
- Me of Little Faith (2008) (New York: Riverhead Books – Penguin Group) 240 pages, ISBN 978-1-59448-994-5.
- Me of Little Faith (paperback version with added content) (2009)
- I'm Dreaming of a Black Christmas (2010)
- One Slight Hitch (Play, Dramatist Play Service) (2013)

== Media releases ==
=== CDs ===
- The White Album (2000)
- Revolver (EP) (2002)
- The End of the Universe (2002)
- Rules of Enragement (2003)
- Luther Burbank Performing Arts Center Blues (2005)
- The Carnegie Hall Performance (2006)
- Anticipation (2008)
- Stark Raving Black (2010)
- The Prophet (2011, unreleased album from 1991)
- In God We Rust (2012)
- Old Yeller (2013)
- The Rant is Due (2017)
- Black to the Future (2017)
- Thanks For Risking Your Life (2020)
- Tragically, I Need You (2023)

=== DVDs ===
- Unleashed (compilation of his four Comedy Central specials plus his appearances on The Daily Show: Indecision 2000) (2002)
- Black on Broadway (2003 HBO Special) (2004)
- A Pair of Lewis Black Shorts (Sidesplitters: The Burt & Dick Story and The Gynecologists) (2006)
- Red, White, and Screwed (2006 HBO Special)
- History of the Joke with Lewis Black (2008 History Channel special)
- Surviving the Holidays with Lewis Black (2009 History Channel special)
- Stark Raving Black (2009)
- In God We Rust (2012 Epix Special)
- Lewis Black: Old Yeller - Live At the Borgata In Atlantic City (2013)
- Black to the Future (2017)
- Thanks for Risking Your Life (2020)

== Filmography ==
=== Film ===
Year	Title	Role	Notes
1986	Hannah and Her Sisters	Paul	
1990	Jacob's Ladder	Jacob's Doctor	
1991	The Hard Way	Banker	
1993	The Night We Never Met	Marty Holder	
1993	Joey Breaker	Pete Grimm	
2000	Sidesplitters: The Burt & Dick Story	Burt	Short film
2002	American Dummy	Club Owner	Short film
2003	The Gynecologists	Cookie LaMotte	Short film
2006	Accepted	Ben Lewis	
2006	Man of the Year	Eddie Langston	
2006	Falling for Grace	Rob York	
2006	Unaccompanied Minors	Oliver Porter	
2007	Farce of the Penguins	Jimmy (voice)	
2008	History of the Joke	Narrator	Documentary
2008	No Free Lunch	Lewis	Short film
2008	What Blows Up Must Come Down!	Furry Murray	Short film
2009	Ollie & the Baked Halibut	Baked Halibut	Short film
2010	Peep World	Narrator	
2011	Afghan Luke	Himself	
2013	Comedy Warriors: Healing through Humor	Himself	
2015	Introducing Parker Dowd	Drew	Short film
2015	Inside Out	Anger (voice)	
2015	Riley's First Date?	Anger (voice)	Short film
2015	Stereotypically You	Charlie's Therapist	
2016	Rock Dog	Linnux (voice)	
2016	Better Off Single	Therapist	
2017	Gilbert	Himself	Documentary
2017	Imitation Girl	Lew	
2019	The Last Laugh	Max Becker	
2024	Inside Out 2	Anger (voice)	
2025	Atrabilious	Roy Altman	

=== Television ===
Year	Title	Role	Notes
1990–1991	The Days and Nights of Molly Dodd	Bernie	5 episodes
1991	Law & Order	Director Franklin Frome	Episode: "Aria"
1994	A&E's An Evening at the Improv	Himself	Season 15, episode 17
1996–present	The Daily Show	Commentator	"Back in Black" segment
1997	Homicide: Life on the Street	Laslo "Punchy" Deleon	Episode: "Deception"
1997	Mad About You	The Pizza Slice	Episode: "Le Sex Show"
2003	The Brak Show	Brain Slug / Zorak	2 episodes
2004	Law & Order: Special Victims Unit	BJ Cameron	Episode: "Obscene"
2005	Duck Dodgers	Manobrain (voice)	Episode: "A Lame Duck Mind"
2005	The Happy Elf	Norbert (voice)	Television film
2005–2007	Harvey Birdman, Attorney at Law	The Deadly Duplicator, Elliott (voice)	4 episodes
2006	Lewis Black: Red, White & Screwed	Himself	HBO comedy special
2007	My Gym Partner's a Monkey	Ted (voice)	Episode: "Hornbill and Ted's Bogus Journey"
2008	Lewis Black's Root of All Evil	Himself	
2009	The Big Bang Theory	Professor Crawley	Episode: "The Jiminy Conjecture"
2010–2013	Scooby-Doo! Mystery Incorporated	Mr. E / Ricky Owens (voice)	Recurring role
2011	Robotomy	Gore-Ax (voice)	Episode: "Mean Green"
2011	The Penguins of Madagascar	Dale (voice)	Episode: "Arch-Enemy"
2012–2014	Teenage Mutant Ninja Turtles	Spider Bytez / Vic (voice)	2 episodes
2016	Madoff	Ezra Merkin	Miniseries
2016	Crisis in Six Scenes	Al	2 episodes
2017	Be Cool, Scooby-Doo!	Mayor Stoughton (voice)	Episode: "World of Witchcraft"
2017	The President Show	Trump's Psyche	Episode: "Joe Cirincione"
2018, 2021	SpongeBob SquarePants	Santa Claus (voice)	2 episodes
2019	The Epic Tales of Captain Underpants	Ragely J. Snarlingtooth (voice)	Episode: "The Angry Abnormal Atrocities of the Astute Animal Aggressors"
2021	Devil May Care	Atheist Steve (voice)	Episode: "The Atheist"
2021	Kamp Koral: SpongeBob's Under Years	Santa Claus (voice)	Episode: "The Ho! Ho! Horror!"
2024	Dream Productions	Anger (voice)	4 episodes

=== Video games ===
Year	Title	Role
2008	Harvey Birdman: Attorney at Law	The Deadly Duplicator
2015	Disney Infinity 3.0	Anger
