= The Bob's Burgers Music Album Vol. 2 =

Soundtrack album by various artists
- Released: August 20, 2021
- Genre: Comedy
- Length: 1:46:07
- Label: Sub Pop

The Bob's Burgers Music Album Vol. 2 is a 2021 soundtrack album for the American animated sitcom Bob's Burgers. It is the second Bob's Burgers soundtrack following the first soundtrack, released in 2017. It contains songs made for seasons 7–9 of the show. It contains an about one minute cast cover of Meat Loaf's "Bat Out of Hell".

== Critical reception ==
Professional ratings
Review scores
Source	Rating
AllMusic	4/5 stars
Clash	8/10
The Line of Best Fit	8/10

Writing for AllMusic, Heather Phares wrote that "Once again, the series' music gives each character and cast member time to shine", noting that "The biggest difference between the music from the show's earlier seasons and the songs on The Bob’s Burgers Music Album Vol. 2 is that the music is even more integrated into Bob's Burgers' increasingly rich storytelling", concluding by stating that "in other words, the whole point of Bob's Burgers. There may be nothing quite as iconic as "Electric Love" or "Bad Things Happen in the Bathroom," but The Bob's Burgers Music Album, Vol. 2 is still a hugely entertaining showcase for the series' creativity as it approached its tenth season." Writing for The Line of Best Fit, Steven Loftin states that "At a whopping ninety tracks, including pre-scene amble, it gives a chance to highlight something that often goes unnoticed. Once these minute-plus tracks are compiled what shines is the talent of the writers and voice actors", noting that "To bring comedy to life with such seeming effortlessness is where the music of Bob’s Burgers thrives. Beholden to a world of wonder, it's based around knowing that life’s too short to listen to a double-length album picking apart the philosophy of life. Why not enjoy a cartoon family battle-singing about the best type of fries instead?"

== Track listing ==
Disc one
No.	Title	Length
1.	"Not the Forgiving Type"	2:00
2.	"That Fortress Is the Worstest (Bakaneko)"	1:16
3.	"That Fortress Is the Worstest (Akkoro Kamui)"	1:21
4.	"That Fortress Is the Worstest (Mizuchi and Dodomeki)"	1:07
5.	"Nobody's Getting In"	0:50
6.	"The Forgiving Type"	1:54
7.	"Flu-ouise"	0:56
8.	"Beyond the Sea"	3:06
9.	"Witchy Witchy"	0:36
10.	"Here Comes the Meat Plane"	0:59
11.	"The Briefest of Glances"	1:45
12.	"You've Got the Guts"	1:49
13.	"You Can't Spell Christmas Without Us"	1:19
14.	"Watching You from a Distant Place"	0:39
15.	"Sky Kiss (Intro)"	1:01
16.	"Sky Kiss"	1:51
17.	"Cat Trainin'"	1:01
18.	"Chunky Blast Offs"	0:48
19.	"Dad-chelor Party"	0:48
20.	"Tuscaloosa Twister"	0:40
21.	"Meat Man"	1:04
22.	"Street Life"	0:55
23.	"Winthrope Manor"	0:44
24.	"Attention Humans of America"	0:53
25.	"General Inzanity Intro"	1:20
26.	"Let My People Rock (Part 1)"	1:34
27.	"Fortess of Inzanity"	1:24
28.	"Let My People Rock (Part 2)"	0:55
29.	"Rock a Rock to Rock and Roll"	0:55
30.	"Don't Rock In, Rock Out"	0:45
31.	"(I've Had) The Time of My Life"	3:03
32.	"Mombo"	0:35
33.	"I Sure Would Like a Mom"	2:02
34.	"Hot Pants, Rain Dance"	2:51
35.	"I Want to Take You Higher"	1:09
36.	"Sexy Little Tiger"	0:42
37.	"Playdates"	1:02
38.	"Who's a Fun Mom on Halloween"	1:39
39.	"Bad at Being a Nun"	1:14
40.	"Give It to Teddy"	1:09

Disc two
No.	Title	Length
1.	"Christmas of My Dreams"	1:32
2.	"Teddy's Bleaken Story"	1:01
3.	"The Bleaken"	1:30
4.	"Art Song"	1:36
5.	"O Christmas Tree"	0:41
6.	"The Bleaken Reprise"	0:58
7.	"Do You Hear What I Hear?"	1:38
8.	"Twinkly Lights"	2:27
9.	"Girl Power Jam"	0:58
10.	"Ga Ga"	0:58
11.	"Makin' It by Hand"	0:59
12.	"BFOT on the Kiss Spot"	0:55
13.	"See Something Sing Something"	0:49
14.	"Sleepovers"	0:46
15.	"Best Couple Friends"	0:44
16.	"Weasel Weasel"	0:58
17.	"Happy Birthday We Forgot"	1:09
18.	"Sugar Cookies"	1:23
19.	"Bat Out of Hell"	1:19
20.	"Mommies Are the Best"	0:38
21.	"Burobu"	0:48
22.	"This Wedding Is My Warzone"	1:15
23.	"Napkining"	0:39
24.	"Gumboy"	0:31
25.	"Friend Zone"	1:34
26.	"Hate the Way I Love You"	2:06
27.	"No Pants in Space"	1:44
28.	"The Right Number of Boys"	1:34
29.	"Wheelie Mammoth"	1:22
30.	"Quarter Assin"	0:38
31.	"Business Monster"	0:53
32.	"Trick or Treat, Sticky Sweets"	0:34
33.	"None of Your Business"	1:03
34.	"Let's Swap Eyes so We Can Empathize"	0:51
35.	"Radar Love"	0:45
36.	"Saving the Bird"	1:23
37.	"Alone"	1:18
38.	"Rollin With Me"	0:48
39.	"Doot Doo I Love You"	1:01
40.	"Snowballs and Sledding"	0:43
41.	"Hey Ange"	0:42
42.	"Bruce the Goose"	1:06
43.	"Pesto in My Pants"	0:43
44.	"Nothing Makes Me Happy"	1:41
45.	"Nothing Makes Me Happier"	1:23
46.	"How Many Sandwiches Can You Name?"	041
47.	"Bioluminescence"	0:45
48.	"Puppet Battle"	0:58
49.	"Regular Fries (Cruel to Be Kind)"	1:05
50.	"CAKE"	0:44
Total length:		1:46:07
