= Greatest Hits (Aqua album) =

Compilation album by Aqua
- Released: 15 June 2009
- Recorded: 1996–2009
- Genre: Bubblegum pop; eurodance; europop; pop
- Length: 70:45
- Label: Universal
- Producer: Claus Norreen; Delgado; Jan Langhoff; Johnny Jam; Peter Hartman; Per Adebratt; Søren Rasted; Tommy Ekman

Aqua chronology
Cartoon Heroes: The Best of Aqua (2002)	Greatest Hits (2009)	Megalomania (2011)

Singles from Greatest Hits
- 1. "Back to the 80's" Released: 25 May 2009; 2. "My Mamma Said" Released: 25 June 2009

Greatest Hits is the first internationally released greatest hits album by Danish-Norwegian pop band Aqua. The album was released on 15 June 2009, on Universal. It is their second greatest hits album overall, with Cartoon Heroes: The Best of Aqua (2002) only being released in Japan. The compilation was not released on any physical or digital format in North America. Greatest Hits includes digitally remastered versions of sixteen songs from Aqua's two previous studio albums, Aquarium (1997) and Aquarius (2000), and three new songs: "Back to the 80s", "My Mamma Said", and "Live Fast – Die Young". "Back to the 80s" was released as the album's lead single on 25 May 2009.

A Special Edition re-issue was released in Denmark on 16 November 2009. It includes a new song, "Spin Me a Christmas", and replaces "Be a Man" with "Good Morning Sunshine". It also includes a DVD with a live recording of Aqua at Tivoli in Copenhagen, recorded on 7 August 2009. The DVD track listing features the unreleased song "Shakin' Stevens (Is a Superstar)", which supposedly were written for the band's third studio album before their split in July 2001. The song was re-written as "Sucker For a Superstar" for the band's third studio album, Megalomania (2011).

The album peaked at number one in Denmark and therefore was released in the rest of Europe on 22 September 2009, but without repeating the same success.

== Commercial performance ==
On the chart dated 26 June 2009 the album debuted at number one in Denmark, where it stayed for two weeks. In its third week on the chart the album fell to number two, and stayed there for six weeks before reaching number one on the chart dated 21 August 2009. The album stayed in the top 40 for thirty-nine weeks. In December 2009 the album was certified two-times platinum by the International Federation of the Phonographic Industry (IFPI) for shipments of 60,000 copies in Denmark.

== Singles ==
"Back to the 80's" was released digitally as the lead single of the album on 25 May 2009. It is Aqua's first single in eight years. On 25 May, it premiered on the Danish radio channel Radio 100FM. The song reached number one in Denmark, replacing the 2009 Eurovision Song Contest winner Alexander Rybak's song "Fairytale" off the top spot for five weeks. "My Mamma Said" was released as the second single from the album in November 2009. Previously, the song had already reached number 11 on the Danish Singles Chart due to strong digital sales from the album. The new song made for the Special Edition re-release.

"Spin Me a Christmas", was released on 16 November 2009.

== Track listings ==
No.	Title	Writer(s)	Producer(s)	Length
1.	"Back to the 80's"	Søren Rasted; Claus Norreen	Rasted	3:44
2.	"My Mamma Said"	Rasted; Lene Nystrøm	Rasted	3:37
3.	"Live Fast Die Young"	Rasted; Nystrøm; Steve Robson; John McLaughlin	Rasted	3:03
4.	"Happy Boys & Girls" (from Aquarium, 1997)	Rasted; Norreen; René Dif; Nystrøm	Johnny Jam; Delgado; Rasted; Norreen	3:34
5.	"Barbie Girl" (from Aquarium, 1997)	Rasted; Norreen; Dif; Nystrøm	Jam; Delgado; Rasted; Norreen	3:15
6.	"Around the World" (from Aquarius, 2000)	Rasted; Norreen	Rasted; Norreen	3:29
7.	"Doctor Jones" (from Aquarium, 1997)	Anders Øland; Rasted; Norreen; Dif	Jam; Delgado; Rasted; Norreen	3:22
8.	"Aquarius" (from Aquarius, 2000)	Rasted; Norreen	Rasted; Norreen	4:21
9.	"Cuba Libre" (from Aquarius, 2000)	Rasted; Norreen	Rasted; Norreen	3:35
10.	"Lollipop" (from Aquarium, 1997)	Rasted; Norreen; Nystrøm	Jam; Delgado; Rasted; Norreen	3:35
11.	"Cartoon Heroes" (from Aquarius, 2000)	Rasted; Norreen	Rasted; Norreen	3:39
12.	"Be a Man" (from Aquarium, 1997)	Rasted; Norreen	Per Adebratt; Tommy Ekman	4:21
13.	"My Oh My" (from Aquarium, 1997)	Rasted; Norreen; Dif	Jam; Delgado; Rasted; Norreen	3:23
14.	"Freaky Friday" (from Aquarius, 2000)	Rasted; Norreen; Dif	Rasted; Norreen	3:44
15.	"We Belong to the Sea" (from Aquarius, 2000)	Rasted; Norreen; Dif	Rasted; Norreen	4:17
16.	"Roses Are Red" (from Aquarium, 1997)	Rasted; Norreen; Dif; Nystrøm; Peter Hartmann; Jan Langhoff	Hartmann & Langhoff	3:42
17.	"Halloween" (from Aquarius, 2000)	Rasted; Norreen; Dif	Rasted; Norreen	3:49
18.	"Turn Back Time" (from Aquarium, 1997)	Rasted; Norreen	Rasted; Norreen	4:02
19.	"Goodbye to the Circus" (from Aquarius, 2000)	Rasted; Norreen	Rasted; Norreen	3:59

Special Edition
No.	Title	Writer(s)	Producer(s)	Length
1.	"Back to the 80's"	Søren Rasted; Claus Norreen	Rasted	3:44
2.	"My Mamma Said"	Rasted; Lene Nystrøm	Rasted	3:37
3.	"Live Fast Die Young"	Rasted; Nystrøm; Steve Robson; John McLaughlin	Rasted	3:03
4.	"Happy Boys & Girls" (from Aquarium, 1997)	Rasted; Norreen; René Dif; Nystrøm	Johnny Jam; Delgado; Rasted; Norreen	3:34
5.	"Barbie Girl" (from Aquarium, 1997)	Rasted; Norreen; Dif	Jam; Delgado; Rasted; Norreen	3:15
6.	"Around the World" (from Aquarius, 2000)	Rasted; Norreen	Rasted; Norreen	3:29
7.	"Doctor Jones" (from Aquarium, 1997)	Anders Øland; Rasted; Norreen; Dif	Jam; Delgado; Rasted; Norreen	3:22
8.	"Aquarius" (from Aquarius, 2000)	Rasted; Norreen	Rasted; Norreen	4:21
9.	"Cuba Libre" (from Aquarius, 2000)	Rasted; Norreen	Rasted; Norreen	3:35
10.	"Lollipop" (from Aquarium, 1997)	Rasted; Norreen; Nystrøm	Jam; Delgado; Rasted; Norreen	3:35
11.	"Cartoon Heroes" (from Aquarius, 2000)	Rasted; Norreen	Rasted; Norreen	3:39
12.	"Good Morning Sunshine" (from Aquarium, 1997)	Rasted; Norreen; Dif	Jam; Delgado; Rasted; Norreen	4:03
13.	"My Oh My" (from Aquarium, 1997)	Rasted; Norreen; Dif	Jam; Delgado; Rasted; Norreen	3:23
14.	"Freaky Friday" (from Aquarius, 2000)	Rasted; Norreen; Dif	Rasted; Norreen	3:44
15.	"We Belong to the Sea" (from Aquarius, 2000)	Rasted; Norreen; Dif	Rasted; Norreen	4:17
16.	"Roses Are Red" (from Aquarium, 1997)	Rasted; Norreen; Dif; Nystrøm; Peter Hartmann; Jan Langhoff	Hartmann & Langhoff	3:42
17.	"Halloween" (from Aquarius, 2000)	Rasted; Norreen; Dif	Rasted; Norreen	3:49
18.	"Turn Back Time" (from Aquarium, 1997)	Rasted; Norreen	Rasted; Norreen	4:02
19.	"Goodbye to the Circus" (from Aquarius, 2000)	Rasted; Norreen	Rasted; Norreen	3:59
20.	"Spin Me a Christmas"	Rasted; Norreen	Rasted; Norreen	3:33

Special edition DVD: Live at Tivoli
No.	Title	Length
1.	"Back to the 80s"
2.	"Cartoon Heroes"
3.	"My Oh My"
4.	"Doctor Jones"
5.	"Live Fast – Die Young"
6.	"Turn Back Time"
7.	"Shakin' Stevens"
8.	"Lollipop"
9.	"Aquarius"
10.	"Freaky Friday"
11.	"My Mamma Said"
12.	"Happy Boys & Girls"
13.	"Barbie Girl"
14.	"We Belong to the Sea"
15.	"Goodbye to the Circus"
16.	"Around the World"
17.	"Roses Are Red"

== Charts ==
=== Charts ===
Chart (2009)	Peak position
Danish Albums Chart	1
Norwegian Albums Chart	7
Swedish Albums Chart	24
UK Albums Chart	135

== Certifications ==
Region	Certification	Certified units/sales
Denmark (IFPI Danmark)	2× Platinum	60,000^{^}
Norway (IFPI Norway)	Gold	15,000^{*}
^{*} Sales figures based on certification alone.^{^} Shipments figures based on certification alone.

== Release history ==
Region	Date	Format
Denmark	15 June 2009	Standard edition
Denmark	16 November 2009	Special edition
United Kingdom	14 September 2009	Standard edition
European Union	22 September 2009	Standard edition
