= Aqua: The Videos =

Video by Aqua
- Released: 1998
- Recorded: 1996–1997
- Genre: Pop, Europop, Eurodance, Bubblegum pop
- Length: 14 minutes
- Label: Universal Music Denmark
- Director: Peder Pedersen

Aqua chronology
Aqua: The Videos (1998)	Aqua: The Video Collection (2000)

Aqua: The Videos is a compilation of Aqua's music videos, released in 1998. It includes four videos, representing the band's 1997 singles, though not in chronological order of release.

== Track listing ==
- "Barbie Girl"
- "Doctor Jones"
- "My Oh My"
- "Lollipop"

== Personnel ==
- Lene Nystrom Rasted – female vocals
- Rene Dif – male vocals
- Soren Nystrom Rasted – keyboard, guitar
- Claus Norreen – keyboard
