= Lollipop (Candyman) =

1997 single by Aqua

Single by Aqua

from the album Aquarium
- B-side: "Good Morning Sunshine"
- Released: 25 November 1997
- Genre: Euro-NRG
- Length: 3:35
- Label: Universal
- Songwriters: Søren Rasted; Claus Norreen; Lene Nystrøm; René Dif; Peter Hartmann; Jan Langhoff
- Producers: Johnny Jam; Delgado; Søren Rasted; Claus Norreen

Aqua singles chronology
"Doctor Jones" (1997)	"Lollipop (Candyman)" (1997)	"Turn Back Time" (1998)

Music video
- "Lollipop (Candyman)" on YouTube

"Lollipop (Candyman)" is a song by Danish-Norwegian dance-pop group Aqua. It was released in November 1997 by Universal Records as the fifth overall single from their debut album, Aquarium (1997), in Australasia, North America, and mainland Europe. However, it was not released in the United Kingdom. "Lollipop" features a prominent role for René Dif, with vocals also from main vocalist Lene. The US CD and cassette single include "Good Morning Sunshine" as the B-side.

The song failed to replicate the success of "Barbie Girl", "Doctor Jones", and "My Oh My" where it was released. In the United States, it became their second top-40 hit and last song to chart there, peaking at No. 23, until 26 years later, when the group was credited on the 2023 Nicki Minaj and Ice Spice single "Barbie World". The single reached the top 10 in Sweden and Australia, staying at number three for five consecutive weeks in the latter country.

== Critical reception ==
Larry Flick from Billboard magazine described the song as a "Barbie Girl" "similar-sounding Euro-NRG ditty" and noted that "although 'Lollipop' does not have such an immediate, media-friendly punch, it's ultimately just as fun and goofy as its predecessor. Sure, this is pop music at its most frivolous and disposable." Dave Sholin from the Gavin Report commented, "Nothing like a sugar rush, and this is yet another double dose of ear candy from Denmark's leading confectioners." Retrospectively, Pop Rescue wrote that it "is laden with pumping beats, and vocal play between René and Lene." They added that "it's quite close to 'Barbie Girl'."

== Music video ==
The accompanying music video features the group in space, much like in the later "Cartoon Heroes", and includes a fight against aliens and a small robot saving the day.

== Track listings ==
- Scandinavian and European CD single
1. "Lollipop (Candyman)" (radio edit) – 3:35
2. "Lollipop (Candyman)" (extended version) – 5:29
- US CD and cassette single
1. "Lollipop (Candyman)" – 3:35
2. "Good Morning Sunshine" – 4:03
- US 12-inch single

A1. "Lollipop (Candyman)" (Fitch Brother's "Sugar Mix") – 6:52
A2. "Lollipop (Candyman)" (extended original mix) – 5:51
B1. "Lollipop (Candyman)" (Razor-N-Go "Lick It Mix") – 12:18

- Australian CD single
1. "Lollipop (Candyman)" (radio edit) – 2:54
2. "Lollipop (Candyman)" (extended mix) – 5:24
3. "Lollipop (Candyman)" (DJ Greek's Candy Mix) – 7:28
4. "Doctor Jones" (Adrenaline club mix) – 6:22
5. "Doctor Jones" (Antiloop club mix) – 9:59
6. "Doctor Jones" (Molella & Phil Jay mix) – 6:22
7. "Barbie Girl" (video)
8. "Doctor Jones" (Metro's full video)

== Charts ==
=== Weekly charts ===
Weekly chart performance for "Lollipop (Candyman)"
Chart (1997–1998)	Peak position
Australia (ARIA)	3
Canada Top Singles (RPM)	38
Canada Dance/Urban (RPM)	9
Europe (Eurochart Hot 100)	70
France (SNEP)	29
Italy (Musica e dischi)	23
New Zealand (Recorded Music NZ)	22
Sweden (Sverigetopplistan)	10
US Billboard Hot 100	23
US Dance Singles Sales (Billboard)	23

=== Year-end charts ===
Year-end chart performance for "Lollipop (Candyman)"
Chart (1998)	Position
Australia (ARIA)	19

== Certifications ==
Certifications and sales for "Lollipop (Candyman)"
Region	Certification	Certified units/sales
Australia (ARIA)	Platinum	70,000^{^}
^{^} Shipments figures based on certification alone.
