= Turn Back Time (Aqua song) =

1998 single by Aqua

Single by Aqua

from the album Aquarium and Sliding Doors: Music from the Motion Picture
- Released: 13 January 1998
- Genre: Pop; downtempo
- Length: 4:09
- Label: Universal
- Songwriters: Søren Rasted; Claus Norreen
- Producers: Johnny Jam; Delgado; Søren Rasted; Claus Norreen

Aqua singles chronology
"Lollipop (Candyman)" (1997)	"Turn Back Time" (1998)	"Good Morning Sunshine" (1998)

Music video
- "Turn Back Time" on YouTube

"Turn Back Time" is a song by Danish dance-pop group Aqua, released as their seventh single overall, and the sixth from their debut album, Aquarium (1997). The song was also included on the soundtrack for the 1998 film Sliding Doors, starring Gwyneth Paltrow, and was released across the world throughout 1998, starting with the United States in January. The track possesses less of a bubble pop sound than Aqua's other releases; it is slow-paced and shows the full range of Lene Nystrøm's vocals but maintains the Aqua sound. In Japan, "Turn Back Time" was released along with "My Oh My". "Turn Back Time" was successful on the charts on several countries, becoming Aqua's third consecutive number one on the UK Singles Chart.

== Composition ==
A soul-searching ballad, "Turn Back Time" involves the vocalist, with a tone of Madonna on "Material Girl", soulfully performing over a downtempo pseudo-funk arrangement of saxophone riffs and plucked guitars over a trip-hop beat. This is a deviation from the Europop aspects, particularly the "plastic pop and twee lyrics" and "kewpie-doll speak", of Aquarium's other singles, such as "Barbie Girl" and "Doctor Jones".

== Critical reception ==
"Turn Back Time"'s restraint in style and sound was a pleasant surprise to critics; some suggested that it indicated the group's versatility. Sarah Davis from Dotmusic argued that it "shows that Aqua can write songs which move beyond the cartoon world of their stylists." Single reviews from Larry Flick, who called it Aqua's "most credible pop offering", and the Gavin Report by Dave Sholin, who called it a "standout", predicted commercial success. Sholin reported that it had "all the elements necessary to quickly float to the top", and that "more than a handful of PDs and MDs consider this ballad to have Number One potential."

== Chart performance ==
"Turn Back Time" peaked at number one in the United Kingdom, becoming the group's third consecutive number-one single. The Official Charts Company reported "Turn Back Time" as a "Pop Gem", UK Singles Chart number-one hits that were forgotten in later years, for the week of 8 March 2014. Writer Justin Myers theorized the track lacked being "larger Than life", of which the group's previous two singles were. In Hungary, it reached number two. "Turn Back Time" entered the top 10 in Ireland and Sweden and was a top-20 hit in Austria, Belgium, Italy and the Netherlands, as well as on the Eurochart Hot 100, where it peaked at number 12 in May 1998. Outside Europe, it reached number two in New Zealand, number 10 in Australia, number 14 on the Canadian RPM 100 Hit Tracks chart, and number 18 on the US Billboard Mainstream Top 40 chart. The single earned a gold record in Australia, New Zealand and Sweden, and a silver record in the UK.

== Retrospective response ==
Can't Stop the Pop declared it to be "their finest song by a country mile – and one of the best pop ballads of the '90s to boot." They also added it as "one of the biggest surprises of the '90s." Alex Young from Consequence of Sound said that the "slower paced song allows Lene's vocal range to shine." Tom Ewing of Freaky Trigger described it as a "cryptic, self-hating ballad about choices and dire consequences." He noted that Nystrøm "has a strong, torchy voice" and "can set a mood." He also added that "in half a verse she's established a lonely, withdrawn, guilty feeling she might push against in the rest of the song." Bob Waliszewski of Plugged In opined that it deals with "regrets over unfaithfulness with a desire for reconciliation".

Pop Rescue said "Turn Back Time" is the best song of their career, adding that "here, Lene shows off her vocal range beautifully, and it's great to hear her pitched against the soft beats, piano, and gentle synths without some randomly thrown in 'eye-pee-eye-ohs. Perfect." Dave Fawbert from ShortList described it as "one of the all-time great lost pop classics. No ifs, no buts, no irony, just a glorious, timeless piece of songwriting."

== Music video ==
The accompanying music video for "Turn Back Time" contained footage from Sliding Doors, and was therefore a departure from the campy and humorous style by the group. There are two different edits of this video, one contains more clips from the film. In the video, the doppelgänger of the lead singer Lene Nystrøm is chasing her in the London Underground. Much of the video was filmed on the abandoned platform 5 at Holborn tube station.

== Track listings ==
- Scandinavian and European CD single, UK cassette single
1. "Turn Back Time" (original version) – 4:10
2. "Turn Back Time" (Love to Infinity's classic radio mix) – 3:17
- Scandinavian maxi-CD single
1. "Turn Back Time" (original version) – 4:08
2. "Turn Back Time" (Love to Infinity's classic radio mix) – 3:17
3. "Turn Back Time" (Love to Infinity's classic Paradise mix) – 7:25
- UK CD1
1. "Turn Back Time" (original version) – 4:08
2. "Turn Back Time" (Love to Infinity's classic radio mix) – 3:20
3. "Turn Back Time" (Metro Scuba club mix) – 6:34
4. "Turn Back Time" (Master mix) – 5:13
5. "Turn Back Time" (Thunderball mix) – 6:59
- UK CD2
1. "Turn Back Time" (original version) – 4:08
2. "Turn Back Time" (Metro radio edit) – 3:22
3. "Turn Back Time" (Love to Infinity's classic Paradise mix) – 7:29
4. "Turn Back Time" (CD-ROM video)
- UK 12-inch single

A1. "Turn Back Time" (album version)
A2. "Turn Back Time" (Love to Infinity's classic Paradise mix)
B1. "Turn Back Time" (Thunderball mix)
B2. "Turn Back Time" (Master mix)

- Australian CD single
1. "Turn Back Time" (album version) – 4:09
2. "Turn Back Time" (Love to Infinity's classic radio mix) – 3:20
3. "Turn Back Time" (Love to Infinity's classic Paradise mix) – 7:25
4. "Turn Back Time" (Metro Scuba club mix) – 6:34
- Japanese CD single
1. "Turn Back Time" (original version)
2. "Turn Back Time" (Love to Infinity's classic radio mix)
3. "My Oh My" (radio edit)
4. "My Oh My" (Spike, Clyde'N'Eightball club mix)

== Charts ==
=== Weekly charts ===
Weekly chart performance for "Turn Back Time"
Chart (1998)	Peak position
Australia (ARIA)	10
Austria (Ö3 Austria Top 40)	19
Belgium (Ultratop 50 Flanders)	42
Belgium (Ultratop 50 Wallonia)	14
Canada Top Singles (RPM)	14
Canada Adult Contemporary (RPM)	41
Croatia (HRT)	8
Estonia (Eesti Top 20)	20
Europe (Eurochart Hot 100)	12
Germany (GfK)	42
Hungary (Mahasz)	2
Ireland (IRMA)	4
Italy (Musica e dischi)	19
Netherlands (Dutch Top 40)	18
Netherlands (Single Top 100)	26
New Zealand (Recorded Music NZ)	2
Scottish Singles Sales (Official Charts)	1
Sweden (Sverigetopplistan)	4
Switzerland (Schweizer Hitparade)	26
UK Singles (Official Charts)	1
UK Airplay (Music Week)	4
US Radio Songs (Billboard)	49
US Pop Airplay (Billboard)	18

=== Year-end charts ===
Year-end chart performance for "Turn Back Time"
Chart (1998)	Position
Australia (ARIA)	50
Belgium (Ultratop 50 Wallonia)	90
Canada Top Singles (RPM)	76
Netherlands (Dutch Top 40)	142
New Zealand (RIANZ)	39
Sweden (Hitlistan)	95
UK Singles (OCC)	68
US Mainstream Top 40 (Billboard)	85

== Certifications ==
Certifications and sales for "Turn Back Time"
Region	Certification	Certified units/sales
Australia (ARIA)	Gold	35,000^{^}
New Zealand (RMNZ)	Gold	5,000^{*}
Sweden (GLF)	Gold	15,000^{^}
United Kingdom (BPI)	Silver	200,000^{^}
^{*} Sales figures based on certification alone.^{^} Shipments figures based on certification alone.
