= Roses Are Red (Aqua song) =

1996 single by Aqua

Single by Aqua

from the album Aquarium
- Released: 24 September 1996
- Length: 3:45
- Label: Universal
- Songwriter(s): Søren Rasted; Claus Norreen; René Dif; Lene Nystrøm; Hartmann & Langhoff
- Producer(s): Hartmann & Langhoff

Aqua singles chronology
"Itzy Bitzy Spider" (1995)	"Roses Are Red" (1996)	"My Oh My" (1997)

Music video
- "Roses Are Red" on YouTube

"Roses Are Red" is a song by Danish dance-pop group Aqua. It was released in September 1996 as their second single—their first under the name of Aqua, as their debut single had been released under the name of Joyspeed. The track would also later feature on Aqua's debut album, Aquarium (1997).

The single was successful primarily in Scandinavia, where it reached No. 1 in their native Denmark as well as No. 2 in Norway and No. 5 in Sweden. Unlike the subsequent singles from Aquarium, "Roses Are Red" did not achieve widespread distribution or airplay outside Scandinavia.

== Track listing ==
Denmark CD single

1. "Roses Are Red" (radio edit) – 3:33
2. "Roses Are Red" (original version) – 3:43
3. "Roses Are Red" (extended version) – 5:58
4. "Roses Are Red" (club version) – 7:00
5. "Roses Are Red" (club edit) – 4:14
6. "Roses Are Red" (Disco 70s Mix) – 3:17
7. "Roses Are Red" (radio instrumental) – 3:44

iTunes (21 April 2017)

1. "Roses Are Red" (Svenstrup & Vendelboe Remix edit) – 3:22
2. "Roses Are Red" (Scenstrup & Vendelboe Remix) – 5:22
3. "Roses Are Red" (original version) – 3:43
4. "Roses Are Red" (instrumental) – 3:42

== Charts ==
=== Weekly charts ===
Chart (1996–1997)	Peak position
Denmark (IFPI)	1
Norway (VG-lista)	2
Sweden (Sverigetopplistan)	5

=== Year-end charts ===
Chart (1997)	Position
Sweden (Topplistan)	24

== Certifications ==
Region	Certification	Certified units/sales
Denmark (IFPI Danmark)	Gold	45,000^{‡}
Norway (IFPI Norway)	Gold	
Sweden (GLF)	Gold	25,000^{^}
^{^} Shipments figures based on certification alone.^{‡} Sales+streaming figures based on certification alone.
