= My Oh My (Aqua song) =

1997 single by Aqua

Single by Aqua

from the album Aquarium
- Released: 11 February 1997
- Genre: Europop; dance
- Length: 3:24
- Label: MCA
- Songwriters: Søren Rasted; Claus Norreen; René Dif
- Producers: Johnny Jam; Delgado; Søren Rasted; Claus Norreen

Aqua singles chronology
"Roses Are Red" (1996)	"My Oh My" (1997)	"Barbie Girl" (1997)

Music video
- "My Oh My" on YouTube

"My Oh My" is a song recorded by Danish dance-pop group Aqua, written by group members Søren Rasted, Claus Norreen and René Dif and produced by Rasted and Norreen with Johnny Jam and Delgado. It was released by MCA as the second single from their debut album, Aquarium (1997), and was initially released in February 1997 before being reissued following the success of "Barbie Girl", "Doctor Jones" and "Turn Back Time" in August 1998. Like many early Aqua tracks, the song featured vocals from both Lene Nystrøm Rasted and Rene Dif. It was the fourth release from the album in the UK, where it peaked at number six, the group's lowest performing single there until "Good Morning Sunshine". The accompanying music video was directed by Peder Pedersen.

== Critical reception ==
British newspaper Birmingham Evening Mail noted that Aqua "got into swashbuckling mood" in the song's accompanying music video. Can't Stop the Pop deemed it "as brilliantly absurd as ever", complimenting the chorus as "terrifically catchy and – surprisingly for a song where galloping hooves form part of the beat – underpinned with a hint of melancholy." Alex Young of Consequence of Sound gave mixed reception, writing, "The sound of a horse galloping in the beginning really draws one’s inner equestrian out", but Dif’s lyrics were lacking."

Sarah Davis from Dotmusic declared it as "another cartoon twist on Europop with an addictive chorus". She added that the music video of the song is "memorable". A reviewer from People Magazine complimented "unexpected flourishes", like the classical harpsichord. Also Pop Rescue noted that the sound of "hooves [that] come galloping alongside the sound of a harpsichord" goes on to form the beat of this "dancey fairtale song". They added that "the end result is quite a catchy little dance baroque number."

== Music video ==
The music video for "My Oh My" featured the four members of the group on a pirate ship, with Lene being captured by the other members (playing pirates) before turning the tables around and taking over. They then go on to discover treasure. The video was one of five Aqua videos directed by Peder Pedersen. It took over two weeks to build the setting for the video which consisted of a tropical island and a real size pirate ship surrounded by water.

== Track listing ==
1. "My Oh My" (Radio edit) – 3:22
2. "My Oh My" (Extended version) – 5:03
3. "My Oh My" (Disco '70s Mix) – 3:23
4. "My Oh My" (Spike, Clyde'n'Eightball Club Mix) – 5:02
5. "My Oh My" (H2O Club Mix) – 7:32
6. "Original Spinet Theme"* – 0:59
7. "My Oh My" – 3:16

* A short instrumental version of the track, from the early development stages of "My Oh My"'s production.

=== Denmark ===
1. "My Oh My" (Radio edit) – 3:22
2. "My Oh My" (Extended version) – 5:03
3. "My Oh My" (Disco '70s Mix) – 3:23
4. "My Oh My" (Spike, Clyde'N'Eightball Club Mix) – 5:02
5. "My Oh My" (H²O Club Remix) – 7:32
6. "Original Spinet Theme" – 0:59

=== UK vinyl ===
Side A:

1. "My Oh My" (Spike, Clyde'N'Eightball Club Mix)
2. "My Oh My" (Extended version)

Side B:

1. "My Oh My" (H2O Club Remix)
2. "My Oh My" (Disco '70s Mix)

=== Australia (1998) ===
1. "My Oh My" (Radio edit) – 3:22
2. "My Oh My" (Extended version) – 5:03
3. "My Oh My" (Disco '70s Mix) – 3:23
4. "My Oh My" (Spike, Clyde'N'Eightball Club Mix) – 5:02
5. "My Oh My" (H2O Club Remix) – 7:32

=== Italy vinyl (1998) ===
Side A:

1. "My Oh My" (Radio) – 3:22
2. "My Oh My" (Extended) – 5:03
3. "My Oh My" (Disco '70s) – 3:23

Side B:

1. "My Oh My" (Spike, Clyde'N'Eightball) – 5:02
2. "My Oh My" (H2O) – 7:32
3. "My Oh My" (Original) – 0:59

== Charts ==
=== Weekly charts ===
Chart (1997–1998)	Peak position
Austria (Ö3 Austria Top 40)	15
Belgium (Ultratop 50 Flanders)	14
Belgium (Ultratop 50 Wallonia)	3
Denmark (IFPI)	2
Estonia (Eesti Top 20)	3
Europe (Eurochart Hot 100)	6
Europe (MTV European Top 20)	4
France (SNEP)	4
Germany (GfK)	12
Iceland (Íslenski Listinn Topp 40)	7
Ireland (IRMA)	30
Italy (Musica e dischi)	6
Italy Airplay (Music & Media)	5
Netherlands (Dutch Top 40)	12
Netherlands (Single Top 100)	17
New Zealand (Recorded Music NZ)	17
Norway (VG-lista)	20
Scotland (OCC)	2
Spain (AFYVE)	6
Sweden (Sverigetopplistan)	4
Switzerland (Schweizer Hitparade)	19
UK Singles (OCC)	6

=== Year-end charts ===
Annual chart rankings for "My Oh My"
Chart (1998)	Position
Belgium (Ultratop 50 Wallonia)	34
France (SNEP)	28
Germany (Media Control)	92
Italy (Musica e dischi)	66
Mainland Europe (Border Breakers)	26
Netherlands (Dutch Top 40)	108
UK Singles (OCC)	137

== Certifications ==
Region	Certification	Certified units/sales
Belgium (BRMA)	Gold	25,000^{*}
France (SNEP)	Gold	250,000^{*}
^{*} Sales figures based on certification alone.
