= Doctor Jones =

1997 single by Aqua

Single by Aqua

from the album Aquarium
- Released: October 1997
- Genre: Pop
- Length: 3:22
- Label: Universal
- Songwriters: Anders Øland; Søren Rasted; Claus Norreen; René Dif
- Producers: Johnny Jam; Delgado; Claus Norreen; Søren Rasted

Aqua singles chronology
"Barbie Girl" (1997)	"Doctor Jones" (1997)	"Lollipop (Candyman)" (1997)

Music video
- "Doctor Jones" on YouTube

"Doctor Jones" is a song by Danish-Norwegian dance-pop group Aqua, released as the fourth single from their debut album, Aquarium. It was the follow-up to their most successful song, "Barbie Girl", and first released as a single in most of Europe in October 1997 by Universal Records. The song reached the top 10 in 15 countries, topping the charts of Australia, Croatia, Ireland and the United Kingdom. Its music video, directed by Peder Pedersen, continued the same cinematic style as in "Barbie Girl", this time using Indiana Jones characters from the film series of the same name.

== Critical reception ==
Scottish Daily Record remarked that the band "give Indiana Jones the pop treatment last offered to Mattel's Barbie dolls." A reviewer from Music & Media wrote, "The motto 'if it ain't broke, don't fix it' seems to have been the creed of the Aqua team when they came up with this worthy successor to the phenomenon that is "Barbie Girl". Not only is it a strong pop song in its own right, but the inclusion of some tasty remixes by Antiloop and Molella & Phil Jay among others could arouse interest from programmers who usually chart their course away from the mainstream."

Music Week gave "Doctor Jones" four out of five, adding, "While not quite as insanely catchy as "Barbie Girl", this is still perfect pop. The now familiar girl/boy chemistry will appeal to kids of all ages." The magazine's Alan Jones said, "Looking set to become rather more than one-hit wonders — their third single sounds like a Madonna song — Aqua must nevertheless first prove themselves with "Doctor Jones", another cutesy novelty along the lines of "Barbie Girl", though taken at a more frantic pace, with the same cutesy girl and more brisk and less musical male counter. Horribly commercial, with lots of Yippy-yiyying and every chance of success."

== Chart performance ==
"Doctor Jones" peaked at No. 1 in Ireland, Italy, and the United Kingdom. In the latter, it reached the top spot during its first week at the UK Singles Chart, on 1 February 1998, spending two weeks at the top. It entered the top 10 also in Austria, Belgium, Denmark, Finland, Germany, Italy, the Netherlands, Spain and Sweden, as well as on the Eurochart Hot 100, where it reached No. 3. Outside Europe, "Doctor Jones" was a No. 1 hit in Australia for seven weeks while peaking at No. 2 in New Zealand. In the United States, it charted on the Billboard Hot Dance Club Play, peaking at No. 18. "Doctor Jones" was awarded with a gold record in Germany and the Netherlands, and a platinum record in Belgium, New Zealand, Sweden and the UK. In Australia, the single earned a triple platinum record.

== Retrospective response ==
In a 2019 retrospective review, Can't Stop the Pop wrote, "Swimming amidst a sea of killer hooks is the chorus, which at times feels almost a little forgotten. It’s testament to the rest of the song being so good that this winds up being the case, rather than the chorus itself being poor." Bob Waliszewski of Plugged In found that the "bouncy" tune deal with "the end to a summer of love". In a 2015 review, Pop Rescue commented, "Again, the contrast and back-and-forth between René's gruff vocals and Lene's higher pitched dance 'eye-pee-eye-ay' vocals really help this track to keep it's up-tempo pace and catchiness. The track is fun, aided by the duo's vocal play and caricatures." Nick Reed from The Quietus named the song a stand out of the album, adding, "It's so effortlessly catchy, with all these little bouncy melody lines, an awesome call-and-response bit, and a chorus with an out-of-nowhere "Wake up now!" line that still makes me laugh today. For this one moment, Aqua were able to channel ABBA at their best, and managed to write a truly perfect pop song in the process."

== Music video ==
The accompanying music video for "Doctor Jones" implies the song is based around the Indiana Jones character from the film series of the same name, with René Dif playing Jones and rescuing his fellow band members from a stereotypical voodoo tribe. The title logo is written in a similar form to that of the Indiana Jones logo. There is also a shot of airplane's flight path over a map, which is used in the film series. The lyric "Dr. Jones, wake up now" may also be a reference to Indiana Jones and the Temple of Doom where Short Round implores Indiana Jones to "wake up" after being brainwashed by the blood of Kālī Ma, or during a scene on an airplane when Willie Scott says, "Calling Dr. Jones, wake up!".

The video was one of five Aqua videos directed by Peder Pedersen, who would later spoof the Indiana Jones-movies again in his computer-animated short film Lego Indiana Jones and the Raiders of the Lost Brick (2008).

== Track listings ==
- European CD1 and UK cassette single
1. "Doctor Jones" (radio edit) – 3:22
2. "Doctor Jones" (extended version) – 5:13
- European CD2
1. "Doctor Jones" (radio edit)
2. "Doctor Jones" (extended mix)
3. "Doctor Jones" (Adrenalin club mix)
4. "Doctor Jones" (Molella and Phil Jay mix)
5. "Doctor Jones" (MPJ speed dub)
6. "Doctor Jones" (Antiloop club mix)
7. "Doctor Jones" (D-Bop's Prescription mix)
- UK CD1
1. "Doctor Jones" (radio edit) – 3:22
2. "Doctor Jones" (extended mix) – 5:13
3. "Doctor Jones" (Adrenalin club mix) – 6:21
4. "Doctor Jones" (Molella and Phil Jay mix) – 5:19
5. "Doctor Jones" (Antiloop club mix) – 10:00
6. "Doctor Jones" (D-Bop's Prescription mix) – 8:02
- UK CD2
1. "Doctor Jones" (radio edit) – 3:22
2. "Doctor Jones" (Metro's 7-inch edit) – 3:36
3. "Doctor Jones" (Metro's X-ray dub) – 6:22
4. "Doctor Jones" (Metro's full video)
- Australian CD single
1. "Doctor Jones" (radio track)
2. "Doctor Jones" (extended mix)
3. "Barbie Girl" (extended version)
4. "My Oh My" (extended version)
5. "Roses Are Red" (club version)
6. "Barbie Girl" (Dirty Rotten Scoundrel Clinical 12-inch mix)

== Charts ==
=== Weekly charts ===
Weekly chart performance for "Doctor Jones"
Chart (1997–1998)	Peak position
Australia (ARIA)	1
Austria (Ö3 Austria Top 40)	8
Belgium (Ultratop 50 Flanders)	3
Belgium (Ultratop 50 Wallonia)	5
Canada Dance/Urban (RPM)	3
Croatia (HRT)	1
Denmark (IFPI)	8
Estonia (Eesti Top 20)	4
Europe (Eurochart Hot 100)	3
Finland (Suomen virallinen lista)	6
Germany (GfK)	7
Iceland (Íslenski Listinn Topp 40)	21
Ireland (IRMA)	1
Italy (FIMI)	3
Italy Airplay (Music & Media)	2
Netherlands (Dutch Top 40)	3
Netherlands (Single Top 100)	3
New Zealand (Recorded Music NZ)	2
Scottish Singles Sales (Official Charts)	1
Spain (AFYVE)	6
Sweden (Sverigetopplistan)	2
Switzerland (Schweizer Hitparade)	11
UK Singles (Official Charts)	1
US Dance Club Songs (Billboard)	18

=== Year-end charts ===
1997 year-end chart performance for "Doctor Jones"
Chart (1997)	Position
Australia (ARIA)	14
Belgium (Ultratop 50 Flanders)	64
Netherlands (Dutch Top 40)	55
Netherlands (Single Top 100)	35
Sweden (Topplistan)	14

1998 year-end chart performance for "Doctor Jones"
Chart (1998)	Position
Australia (ARIA)	20
Belgium (Ultratop 50 Flanders)	52
Belgium (Ultratop 50 Wallonia)	28
Canada Dance/Urban (RPM)	49
Europe (Eurochart Hot 100)	20
Europe Border Breakers (Music & Media)	21
Germany (Media Control)	36
Italy (Musica e dischi)	34
Netherlands (Dutch Top 40)	124
Netherlands (Single Top 100)	60
UK Singles (OCC)	15

== Certifications ==
Certifications for "Doctor Jones"
Region	Certification	Certified units/sales
Australia (ARIA)	3× Platinum	210,000^{^}
Belgium (BRMA)	Platinum	50,000^{*}
Denmark (IFPI Danmark)	Platinum	90,000^{‡}
Germany (BVMI)	Gold	250,000^{^}
Netherlands (NVPI)	Gold	50,000^{^}
New Zealand (RMNZ)	Gold	15,000^{‡}
Sweden (GLF)	Platinum	30,000^{^}
United Kingdom (BPI)	Platinum	600,000^{^}
^{*} Sales figures based on certification alone.^{^} Shipments figures based on certification alone.^{‡} Sales+streaming figures based on certification alone.

== Release history ==
Release dates and formats for "Doctor Jones"
Region	Date	Format(s)	Label(s)	Ref.
Europe	October 1997	CD	Universal	
Australia	1 December 1997	CD	Universal	
United Kingdom	26 January 1998	CD; cassette	Universal	
