= Aquarium (Aqua album) =

Studio album by Aqua
- Released: 26 March 1997
- Recorded: 1996
- Genre: Eurodance; Eurodisco
- Length: 40:44
- Label: Universal
- Producer: Per Adebratt; Delgado; Tommy Ekman; Peter Hartman; Johnny Jam; Jan Langhoff; Claus Norreen; Søren Rasted

Aqua chronology
Aquarium (1997)	Aquarius (2000)

Singles from Aquarium
- 1. "Roses Are Red" Released: 24 September 1996; 2. "My Oh My" Released: 11 February 1997; 3. "Barbie Girl" Released: April 1997; 4. "Doctor Jones" Released: October 1997; 5. "Lollipop (Candyman)" Released: 25 November 1997; 6. "Turn Back Time" Released: 13 January 1998; 7. "Good Morning Sunshine" Released: 14 December 1998

Professional ratings
Review scores
Source	Rating
AllMusic	3.5/5 stars
Entertainment Weekly	C
Music Week	5/5 stars
NME	1/10
Smash Hits	4/5 stars
Village Voice	(dud)

Aquarium is the debut studio album by Danish band Aqua, released on 26 March 1997. The album is best known for including the globally successful single "Barbie Girl", which went on to become a widely recognizable hit around the world, as well as the popular track “Lollipop (Candyman)”. The album also featured the songs "Doctor Jones" and "Turn Back Time". In early 1997, the release of Aquarium was initially preceded by the singles "Roses Are Red" and "My Oh My", which was released a second time in 1998.

The album's third (and most popular) single, "Barbie Girl", brought the group to international attention after reaching number one across Europe, Australia, and New Zealand, among other territories. The song later peaked at number 7 in the United States, at the end of 1997. Its success helped the album reach number one in both the group's home countries, and make the top 10 in the UK and US. While not selling as highly as "Barbie Girl", the album's fourth single, "Doctor Jones", was released in late 1997 and became a number one hit in Australia and the UK. "Turn Back Time" would later give the group their third consecutive number-one single in the UK, despite reaching only number 16 in their native Denmark. The record's final single, "Good Morning Sunshine", was notably more low-key than the band's previous dance-pop, uptempo releases; the song failed to chart highly, only being released in select regions and, like the earlier "Lollipop (Candyman)", was the group's third and final song to chart in the US. The album has sold 14 million copies worldwide.

== Chart performance ==
Aquarium debuted at number one in Denmark. As of August 2001, the album had sold 430,000 copies in Denmark. It is the third best-selling album in Denmark to date, only beaten by Danish recording artist Kim Larsen's 1983 album Midt om natten and his 1986 album Forklædt som voksen. The album debuted at number 15 on the Billboard 200 in the United States, and later peaked at number seven. It would spend a total of 50 weeks on the album sales chart, and sold 1.7 million copies in 1997. On 4 March 1999, the album was certified three times platinum by the Recording Industry Association of America (RIAA) for sales of three million units, becoming the most successful Eurodance album in the US since Ace of Base's The Sign (1993). Aquarium has been certified four times platinum by the International Federation of the Phonographic Industry (IFPI) for shipments of four million copies inside Europe.

== Track listings ==
Aquarium track listing
No.	Title	Writer(s)	Producer(s)	Length
1.	"Happy Boys & Girls"	Søren Rasted; Claus Norreen; René Dif; Lene Nystrøm	Johnny Jam; Delgado; Rasted; Norreen	3:37
2.	"My Oh My"	Rasted; Norreen; Dif	Johnny Jam; Delgado; Rasted; Norreen	3:25
3.	"Barbie Girl"	Rasted; Norreen; Dif; Nystrøm	Johnny Jam; Delgado; Rasted; Norreen	3:16
4.	"Good Morning Sunshine"	Rasted; Norreen; Dif	Johnny Jam; Delgado; Rasted; Norreen	4:03
5.	"Doctor Jones"	Anders Øland; Rasted; Norreen; Dif	Johnny Jam; Delgado; Rasted; Norreen	3:22
6.	"Heat of the Night"	Rasted; Norreen	Rasted; Norreen; Hartmann & Langhoff	3:33
7.	"Be a Man"	Rasted; Norreen; Nystrøm	Tommy Ekman; Per Adebratt	4:22
8.	"Lollipop (Candyman)"	Rasted; Norreen; Nystrøm; Dif; Peter Hartmann; Jan Langhoff	Johnny Jam; Delgado; Rasted; Norreen	3:35
9.	"Roses Are Red"	Rasted; Norreen; Dif; Nystrøm; Hartmann; Langhoff	Hartmann & Langhoff	3:43
10.	"Turn Back Time"	Rasted; Norreen	Johnny Jam; Delgado; Rasted; Norreen	4:09
11.	"Calling You"	Rasted; Norreen; Dif; Hartmann; Langhoff	Rasted; Norreen; Dif; Hartmann & Langhoff; Johnny Jam (vocals); Delgado (vocals)	3:33

Disc 2: Aquarium – Remixed
No.	Title	Length
1.	"Barbie Girl" (extended version)	5:16
2.	"My Oh My" (extended version)	5:06
3.	"Roses Are Red" (club version)	7:01
4.	"Lollipop" (Razor 'N' Go "Lick It" Mix)	12:20
5.	"My Oh My" (H2O Club Remix)	7:34
6.	"Barbie Girl" (Dirty Rotten Scoundrel Clinical 12" Mix)	8:37

Re-issue edition bonus tracks
No.	Title	Length
12.	"Barbie Girl" (extended version)	5:16
13.	"My Oh My" (extended version)	5:06
14.	"Roses Are Red" (club version)	7:00
15.	"Lollipop" (Razor 'N' Go "Lick It" Mix)	12:16
16.	"Barbie Girl" (Dirty Rotten Scoundrel Radio Mix)	4:12

Limited Christmas edition bonus tracks
No.	Title	Length
12.	"Didn't I"	3:17
13.	"My Oh My" (Spike, Clyde 'N' Eightball Club Mix)	5:02
14.	"Lollipop (Candyman)" (extended version)	5:28
15.	"Turn Back Time" (Love to Infinity's Classic Radio Mix)	3:20
16.	"Doctor Jones" (Metro's 7" Edit)	3:36
17.	"The Official Megamix"	11:16

Picture disc edition bonus tracks
No.	Title	Writer(s)	Producer(s)	Length
12.	"Didn't I"		Rasted, Norreen, Johnny Jam, Delgado	3:22
13.	"Doctor Jones" (Molella & Phil Jay Mix)	Anders Øland, Dif	Rasted, Norreen, Johnny Jam, Delgado	5:29

Japan bonus tracks
No.	Title	Length
12.	"Didn't I"	3:17
13.	"Roses Are Red" (Disco 70' Mix)	3:17

South Korea bonus tracks
No.	Title	Length
12.	"Roses Are Red" (club version)	7:01
13.	"Roses Are Red" (club edit)	4:12
14.	"Roses Are Red" (Disco 70' Mix)	3:10

== Personnel ==
- Per Adebratt – producer, arrangement, mixing
- Bee – backing vocals
- Marian Binderup – backing vocals
- Mogens Binderup – backing vocals
- Vivian Cardinal – backing vocals
- Douglas Carr – guitar
- Delgado – producer, vocal producer, arrangement, mixing
- René Dif – songwriter, lead vocals
- Tommy Ekman – producer, arrangement, mixing
- Björn Engelmann – mastering
- Peter Hartmann – songwriter, producer, arrangement, mixing
- Claus Hvass – guitar
- Johnny Jam – producer, vocal producer, arrangement, mixing
- Kati – backing vocals
- Jan Langhoff – songwriter, producer, arrangement, mixing, guitar
- Claus Norreen – songwriter, producer, arrangement, mixing, instruments
- Lene Nystrøm – songwriter, lead and backing vocals
- Søren Rasted – songwriter, producer, arrangement, mixing, instruments, backing vocals
- Anders Øland – songwriter

Credits adapted from album liner notes.

== Charts ==
=== Weekly charts ===
Weekly chart performance for Aquarium
Chart (1997–1998)	Peak position
Australian Albums (ARIA)	1
Austrian Albums (Ö3 Austria)	4
Belgian Albums (Ultratop Flanders)	4
Belgian Albums (Ultratop Wallonia)	3
Canadian Albums (Billboard)	1
Danish Albums (Hitlisten)	1
European Albums (Top 100)	3
Dutch Albums (Album Top 100)	6
Finnish Albums (Suomen virallinen lista)	2
French Albums (SNEP)	11
German Albums (Offizielle Top 100)	6
Hungarian Albums (MAHASZ)	10
Irish Albums (IRMA)	6
Italian Albums (FIMI)	1
Japanese Albums (Oricon)	41
Malaysian Albums (RIM)	3
New Zealand Albums (RMNZ)	1
Norwegian Albums (VG-lista)	1
Portuguese Albums (AFP)	5
Scottish Albums (OCC)	4
Spanish Albums (PROMUSICAE)	3
Swedish Albums (Sverigetopplistan)	1
Swiss Albums (Schweizer Hitparade)	3
Taiwanese International Albums (IFPI)	1
UK Albums (OCC)	6
US Billboard 200	7

=== Year-end charts ===
1997 year-end chart performance for Aquarium
Chart (1997)	Position
Australian Albums (ARIA)	43
Belgian Albums (Ultratop Flanders)	35
Belgian Albums (Ultratop Wallonia)	76
Canadian Albums (SoundScan)	6
Danish Albums (Hitlisten)	1
Dutch Albums (Album Top 100)	63
European Albums (Top 100)	22
New Zealand Albums (RMNZ)	27
Norwegian Albums (VG-lista)	1
Swedish Albums & Compilations (Sverigetopplistan)	1
UK Albums (OCC)	79
US Billboard 200	74

1998 year-end chart performance for Aquarium
Chart (1998)	Position
Australian Albums (ARIA)	2
Austrian Albums (Ö3 Austria)	20
Belgian Albums (Ultratop Flanders)	15
Belgian Albums (Ultratop Wallonia)	17
Canadian Albums (RPM)	5
Canadian Albums (SoundScan)	8
Danish Albums (Hitlisten)	15
Dutch Albums (Album Top 100)	29
European Albums (Top 100)	5
French Albums (SNEP)	34
German Albums (Offizielle Top 100)	19
New Zealand Albums (RMNZ)	15
Swedish Albums & Compilations (Sverigetopplistan)	17
Swiss Albums (Schweizer Hitparade)	15
UK Albums (OCC)	36
US Billboard 200	36

== Certifications and sales ==
Certifications and sales for Aquarium
Region	Certification	Certified units/sales
Australia (ARIA)	6× Platinum	420,000^{^}
Austria (IFPI Austria)	Gold	25,000^{*}
Belgium (BRMA)	Platinum	50,000^{*}
Brazil (Pro-Música Brasil)	Gold	100,000^{*}
Canada (Music Canada)	Diamond	1,083,000
Denmark (IFPI Danmark)	15× Platinum	430,000
Finland (Musiikkituottajat)	2× Platinum	72,757
France (SNEP)	Platinum	300,000^{*}
Germany (BVMI)	Gold	250,000^{^}
Hong Kong (IFPI Hong Kong)	Platinum	20,000^{*}
India	—	330,000
Italy	—	700,000
Japan (RIAJ)	Platinum	200,000^{^}
Korea	—	58,000
Netherlands (NVPI)	Platinum	100,000^{^}
New Zealand (RMNZ)	Platinum	15,000^{^}
Norway (IFPI Norway)	4× Platinum	200,000^{*}
Portugal	—	75,000
Singapore	—	75,000
Spain (Promusicae)	5× Platinum	500,000^{^}
Sweden (GLF)	5× Platinum	400,000^{^}
Switzerland (IFPI Switzerland)	Gold	25,000^{^}
Thailand	—	150,000
United Kingdom (BPI)	Platinum	565,000
United States (RIAA)	3× Platinum	4,000,000
Summaries
Asia Pacific	—	3,000,000
Europe (IFPI)	4× Platinum	4,000,000^{*}
Latin America	—	400,000
Worldwide	—	14,000,000
^{*} Sales figures based on certification alone.^{^} Shipments figures based on certification alone.

== Release history ==
Release formats for Aquarium
Country	Date	Format	Label
Denmark	26 March 1997	CD	MCA; Universal
Norway	May 1997	CD	MCA; Universal
Sweden	May 1997	CD	MCA; Universal
Netherlands	1 September 1997	CD	Universal
United States	9 September 1997	CD	Universal
Europe	22 April 2017	LP	Universal
