= Good Morning Sunshine =

Single by Aqua

from the album Aquarium
- Released: 14 December 1998
- Length: 4:03
- Label: Universal
- Songwriter(s): Søren Rasted; Claus Norreen; René Dif
- Producer(s): Johnny Jam; Delgado; Claus Norreen; Søren Rasted

Aqua singles chronology
"Turn Back Time" (1998)	"Good Morning Sunshine" (1998)	"Cartoon Heroes" (2000)

Music video
- "Good Morning Sunshine" (live) on YouTube

"Good Morning Sunshine" is a song by Danish-Norwegian band Aqua from their debut album, Aquarium (1997). The group's eighth overall single as well as the seventh and last from Aquarium, the song was the first not to be released worldwide since "Lollipop (Candyman)" (1997). The song was released in December 1998, peaking at number 25 in Denmark and number 18 in the United Kingdom, becoming their lowest-charting song in the UK from the Aquarium album.

The song itself was similar to "Turn Back Time", with a slower beat to previous tracks. In a documentary released in the early 2000s, the group members and principal songwriters Søren Rasted and Claus Norreen played part of an early version of the song, which was similar to their more bubblegum dance songs. According to the two, the song was going to be released as another pop song, but was changed later on.

Following the release of "Good Morning Sunshine", the group went on a 14-month hiatus in order to go on tour and record their second album, Aquarius (2000).

== Track listings ==
UK CD1

No.	Title	Length
1.	"Good Morning Sunshine" (radio edit)	4:03
2.	"Good Morning Sunshine" (Love to Infinity's classic radio mix)	3:46
3.	"Good Morning Sunshine" (CD-ROM video)	4:33

UK CD2

No.	Title	Length
1.	"Good Morning Sunshine" (radio edit)	4:03
2.	"The Official Megamix"	11:14

Scandinavia

No.	Title	Length
1.	"Good Morning Sunshine" (radio edit)	4:05
2.	"Good Morning Sunshine" (Love to Infinity's classic radio mix)	3:46
3.	"Good Morning Sunshine" (Love to Infinity's master mix)	6:47
4.	"Good Morning Sunshine" (Love to Infinity's Nassaunautics mix)	7:10

Europe

No.	Title	Length
1.	"Good Morning Sunshine" (radio edit)	4:03
2.	"Good Morning Sunshine" (Love to Infinity's classic radio mix)	3:46

== Charts ==
Chart (1998–1999)	Peak position
Germany (GfK)	94
Netherlands (Dutch Top 40 Tipparade)	17
Netherlands (Single Top 100)	80
Scotland (OCC)	18
UK Singles (OCC)	18
