= Lego Star Wars: The Quest for R2-D2 =

2009 film by Peder Pedersen

- Written by: Michael Pratt; Keith Malone; John McCormack; Daniel Lipkowitz; Ole Holm Christensen; Peder Pedersen
- Directed by: Peder Pedersen
- Theme music composer: Anthony Lledo; John Williams
- Country of origin: Denmark
- Original language: English

Production
- Producers: Ole Holm Christensen; Torsten Jacobsen
- Editor: Thomas J. Mikkelsen
- Running time: 5 minutes
- Production companies: M2Film; Lego; Lucasfilm

Original release
- Network: Cartoon Network
- Release: August 27, 2009

Lego Star Wars: The Quest for R2-D2 is a 2009 comedy short film directed by Peder Pedersen and produced by M2Film for Lego and Cartoon Network in collaboration with Lucasfilm. It is based on The Lego Group's Lego Star Wars construction toy line, which is based on George Lucas' movie franchise of the same name.

It was made as a follow-up to Lego Indiana Jones and the Raiders of the Lost Brick (2008) and premiered on Cartoon Network on August 27, 2009, "in celebration of 10 years of LEGO Star Wars". The story follows the characters from the 2008 series, Star Wars: The Clone Wars. Similar to Lego Indiana Jones and the Raiders of the Lost Brick the film also includes several inside-jokes that pay homage to the Star Wars series, the Indiana Jones films and George Lucas's THX 1138.

== Plot ==
R2-D2 is blasted out of Anakin Skywalker's Jedi Starfighter during their escape from a droid control ship. Anakin returns to the Jedi Temple on Coruscant, where Obi-Wan Kenobi, Master Yoda, and other Jedi masters task him with recovering R2 and R2's blueprints, as Separatist leaders are desperate to recover the droid. Meanwhile, R2-D2 relaxes on Tatooine.

Anakin and his Padawan Ahsoka Tano defeat an Exogorth while searching for R2 in an asteroid field. On Tatooine, a group of Jawas kidnap R2. The Jawas hold an auction where R2 is purchased by General Grievous, who takes him back to a Trade Federation battlecruiser. However, R2 manages to escape and hide. Captain Rex and Commander Cody, sent by Chancellor Palpatine to Hoth to aid in the search, narrowly avoid detection by an army of droids.

Aboard the Twilight, Anakin and Ahsoka receive R2's signal. In hiding, R2 meets another droid named R2-KT, whom he is attracted to. The Galactic Republic launches an assault on the battlecruiser, and Anakin and Ahsoka board the ship. Anakin, Ahsoka, Captain Rex, and Commander Cody confront General Grievous, Count Dooku, and Asajj Ventress, who are holding R2 hostage. Obi-Wan and Yoda appear, and Yoda uses the Force to defeat the trio.

With R2 safe, he projects a holographic image of the grand opening advertisement for Skywalker World, an amusement park. At Skywalker World, R2-D2 goes on a Tunnel of Love ride with R2-KT.

== Voice cast ==
- Matt Lanter as Anakin Skywalker (grunts)
- James Arnold Taylor as Obi-Wan Kenobi (grunts)
- Dee Bradley Baker as Captain Rex, Commander Cody, Clone Troopers (archived audio)
- Frank Welker as the Exogorth
- Matthew Wood as General Grievous and Battle Droids (grunts and archived audio)
- Christopher Lee as Darth Tyranus (also known as Count Dooku) (grunts)
- Tom Kane as Yoda (grunts)

== Video game ==
In October 2009, Lego announced a free online video game tie in to The Quest for R2-D2 created using the Unity engine. The version on Lego.com features four playable characters (two to start, two unlockable) and the ability to save the player's progress. Each character the player wins with gets them another quarter of instructions for a Lego Trade Federation Cruiser. The version on starwars.com allows only the use of Anakin Skywalker and does not have a save feature. The game version on the Lego website also allows the use of Asajj Ventress. The player has a choice to fight for the dark side or the light side of the force (between Anakin or Asajj).

The game was well received, with Jim Squires of GameZebo calling it "even better than the originals".
