= René Dif =

Danish musician and actor

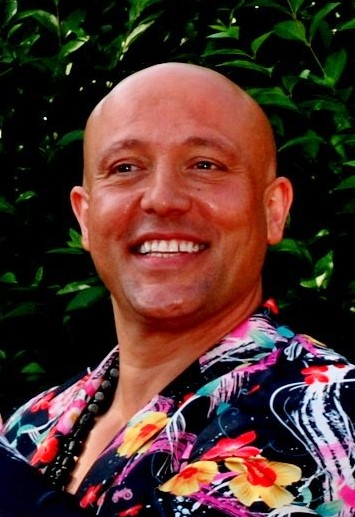
- Dif in 2013

Background information
- Born: 17 October 1967 (age 58); Copenhagen, Denmark
- Origin: Copenhagen, Denmark
- Genres: Pop, dance-pop, Eurodance, europop
- Occupations: Musician, singer-songwriter, DJ, actor
- Instruments: Vocals; turntables; guitar
- Years active: 1989–present
- Label: Universal
- Formerly of: Aqua

René Dif (born 17 October 1967) is a Danish musician, singer-songwriter, DJ and actor, best known as the male vocalist of the Danish-Norwegian Eurodance group Aqua.

== Biography ==
=== 1994–1995: Groove your soul ===
While he was in Barbados, Dif heard a local DJ on the radio and decided to become a DJ. He went to Norway to pursue his dream of becoming a star. Dif met Lene Nystrøm on a cruise ship in 1994. When he, Claus Norreen, and Søren Rasted were setting up a band, they needed a singer, and Lene was asked to join. The band, which was later known as Aqua, became an international success. While a DJ in Norway, Dif met DJ Alligator, with whom he made an album, Groove Your Soul, and the debut single "I Believe".

=== 1996–2001: Aqua ===
Dif, as a member of Aqua, has had over ten top 10 hits in his home country. The band sold more than 28 million records worldwide and appeared in the Guinness Book of Records as the only debut band with three "self-penned" number one hits in the UK. He has received more than 140 Gold and Platinum albums, and a Diamond album (1 million albums sold) in Canada. Aqua's main hits were "Roses Are Red", "My Oh My", "Barbie Girl", "Lollipop (Candyman)", "Doctor Jones", "Turn Back Time", "Good Morning Sunshine", "Cartoon Heroes" and "Around the World".

=== 2001–present: Solo career ===
Following Aqua's split in 2001, Dif released solo singles, including "Let It All Out (Push It)" and "The Uhh Uhh Song". In 2004 he began a career as an actor, starring in several movies directed by Lasse Spang Olsen. He owned a short-lived bar in downtown Copenhagen. In 2002 he published an autobiography titled Popdreng – Ud af skabet.

=== 2007–present: Aqua reunion ===
Aqua reunited in 2008 as a live band. In March 2011, Aqua released the first single, "How R U Doin?", from their third album Megalomania, released in September 2011 following the release of two more singles, "Playmate to Jesus" and "Like a Robot".

== Personal life ==
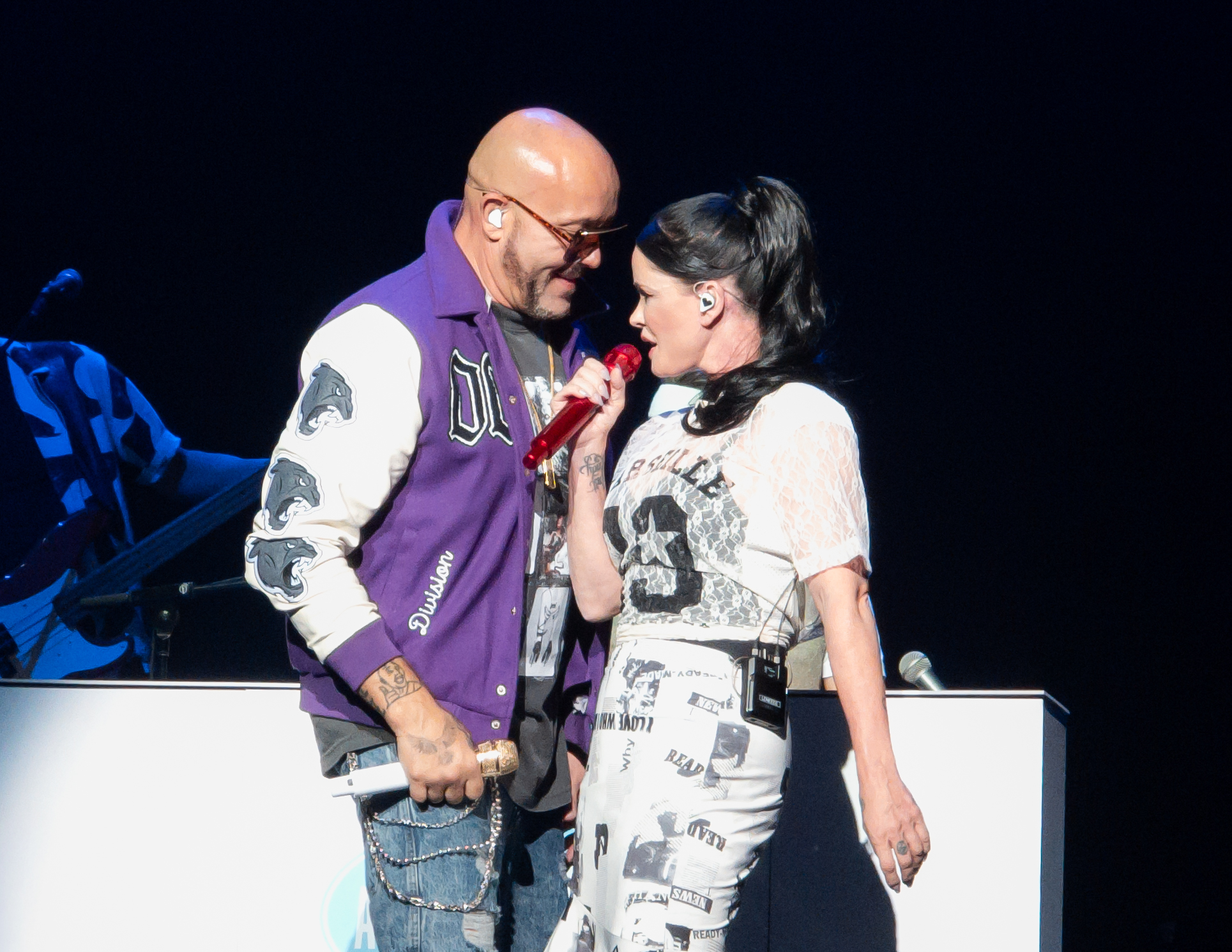
Dif performing with Lene Nystrøm, 2025; he invited her to join Aqua when they were in a relationship

Dif was in a relationship with fellow Aqua band member Lene Nystrøm, whom he invited to join the band in 1994. They were in a relationship for three years, before they broke up.

He later married Rikke Maija, a health coach with whom he has two children. They have since divorced.

He is now in a relationship with Linet Jo.

== Discography ==
=== Studio albums ===
List of albums, with selected chart positions and certifications
Year	Album details	Peak chart positions				Certifications
Year	Album details	DEN	NOR	SWE	GER	Certifications
1995	Groove your soul (Factual Beat feat. René Dif): Released: 1995; Label: Happy One Records (HAP 013–2); Formats: CD	—	—	—	—	
"—" denotes items that did not chart or were not released.

=== Singles ===
List of singles, with selected chart positions
Year	Title	Peak chart positions				Album
Year	Title	DEN	NOR	SWE	GER	Album
2003	"Let it all out (Push it)"	2	—	—	—	Non-album single
2003	"The uhh uhh song"	–	—	—	—	Non-album single
2004	"Uhh la la la"	–	—	—	—	Non-album single
2007	"Jamaica ska"	14	—	—	—	Non-album single
2007	"All up to you"	17	—	—	—	Non-album single
"—" denotes items that did not chart or were not released.

=== Guest appearances ===
List of guest appearances, with selected chart positions
Year	Title	Peak chart positions				Album
Year	Title	DEN	NOR	SWE	GER	Album
1995	"I believe" (Factual Beat feat. René Dif)	–	—	—	—	Groove your soul
1995	"Give me your love" (Factual Beat feat. René Dif)	–	—	—	—	Groove your soul
1995	"Itzy Bitzy Spider" (Joyspeed)	–	–	54	—	Non-album single
"—" denotes items that did not chart or were not released.

=== Promotional singles ===
- 1999: "I bif med Dif"
- 2006: "Way to go" (MySpace release only)
- 2011: "Sitting in a room" (Digital release only)

=== Music videos ===
Year	Title	Director(s)	Notes
2003	"Let it all out (Push it)"	Andreas Tibblin	René Dif's debut solo music video for "Let it all out (Push it)" is directed by Andreas Tibblin for Coolcleaner Films. He appears as a macho player and a DJ in various locations surrounded by beautiful women. In some scenes René's popping out of the video. This song samples Salt-n-Pepa's song "Push It".
2011	"Sitting in a room"	Unknown	A fun video nearly shot eight years after his debut solo music video for "Let it all out (Push it)".
2012	"Til døden os skiller"	Sidney Lexy Plaut	Directed by the group DP Sidney Lexy Plaut & Co in cooperation with René Dif.

== Filmography ==
=== Motion pictures ===
- 1999: Get ready to be boyzvoiced (Cameo)
- 2004: Den gode strømer (The good cop) (Thomas)
- 2004: Inkasso (The collector) (Omar Halim)
- 2007: Pistoleros (Eurotrash) (Luc)
- 2009: Sorte Kugler (Black eggs) (Cameo)
- 2011: Far til fire – På japansk (Father of four – In Japanese mode) (TV Producer)
- 2011: Det grå guld (The grey gold) (Neighbour #1)

=== Television ===
- 2000: Reimer Bo møder (1 Episode)
- 2001: Venner for livet – Friends forever (1 Episode)
- 2001: Eurovision Song Contest 2001 (1 Episode)
- 2002: Danish Dance Awards 2002 (1 Episode)
- 2002: Go' aften Danmark (1 Episode)
- 2003: Robbie Williams – Live in Horsens (1 Episode)
- 2003: Stjerne for en aften – Portræt af en stjerne (1 Episode)
- 2003: Rundfunk (1 Episode)
- 2003: Go' aften Danmark (1 Episode)
- 2004: Boogie Århus Listen (1 Episode)
- 2004: Shooting Stars (1 Episode)
- 2004: Sara & Signe (1 Episode)
- 2005: aHA! (1 Episode)
- 2005: Kanal 5's Bet on Bet Pokershow (1 Episode)
- 2005: Clement direkte med Clement Kjersgaard (1 Episode)
- 2006: Musikprogrammet – Dance 90'ernes danske eksportsucces (1 Episode)
- 2006: Go' aften Danmark (1 Episode)
- 2007: Gu'skelov du kom (1 Episode)
- 2008: Zulu djævleræs (2 Episodes)
- 2009: Den store klasse fest (1 Episode)
- 2009: Zulu djævleræs (3 Episodes)
- 2009: Vild med dans (6 Episodes)
- 2014: South park (Cock Magic) (Performing Barbie Girl)

=== Commercials ===
- 2006: Extra Bladet (Magazine)
- 2007: Kim's Crisps – Chips Kongen (Food; 3 Commercials)
- 2012: CBB Mobile (Mobile)

== Books ==
- 2002: Popdreng – Ud af skabet (Autobiography)
