= Barbie Girl =

1997 single by Aqua

Single by Aqua

from the album Aquarium
- Released: April 1997
- Genre: Bubblegum pop; dance-pop; Europop; Eurodance; novelty
- Length: 3:16
- Label: Universal; MCA
- Songwriters: Søren Rasted; Claus Norreen; René Dif; Lene Nystrøm
- Producers: Johnny Jam; Delgado; Søren Rasted; Claus Norreen

Aqua singles chronology
"My Oh My" (1997)	"Barbie Girl" (1997)	"Doctor Jones" (1997)

Music video
- "Barbie Girl" on YouTube

Audio sample
- file; help

"Barbie Girl" is a song by Danish-Norwegian dance-pop group Aqua. It was released in April 1997 by Universal and MCA as the third single from the group's debut studio album, Aquarium. The song was written by band members Søren Rasted, Claus Norreen, René Dif, and Lene Nystrøm, and was produced by the former two alongside Johnny Jam and Delgado. It was written after Rasted saw an exhibit on kitsch culture in Denmark that featured Barbie dolls. The accompanying music video was directed by Danish directors Peder Pedersen and Peter Stenbæk.

The song topped the charts worldwide, particularly in European countries such as the United Kingdom, where it was a number-one hit for four weeks and remains one of the best-selling singles of all time. It also reached number two in the group's homeland and peaked at number seven on the US Billboard Hot 100. It is Aqua's most popular work and was also performed as the interval act in the Eurovision Song Contest 2001. Mattel accused Aqua's label of diluting the image of Barbie, leading to the controversial lawsuit Mattel, Inc. v. MCA Records, Inc.. Twenty-five years later, Mattel licensed the song in the film Barbie and additionally sampled it for a new song, Nicki Minaj and Ice Spice's "Barbie World" for Barbie the Album. That same year, Billboard magazine ranked it among the "500 Best Pop Songs of All Time".

== Background ==
Rene came up with the original lyric Come on Barbie, Let's go party! and we wanted to put voices to the dolls and imagine what they would say to each other.

— Lene Nystrøm talking to Music Week about the song

The lyrics of the song "Barbie Girl" are about Barbie and Ken, the dolls made by Mattel. Both the song and its music video feature Lene Nystrøm as Barbie and René Dif as Ken. As such, the lyrics drew the ire of Barbie's corporate owners, and a lawsuit was filed by Mattel. A footnote on the back of the Aquarium CD case precisely stated that "The song 'Barbie Girl' is a social comment and was not created or approved by the makers of the doll."

"Barbie Girl" is written in the key of C-sharp minor, using major chords and an upbeat tempo to create an effect band member Søren Rasted calls "the plus and minus". The song has a tempo of 130 beats per minute.

Although "Barbie Girl" was released the same year as the pitch correction software Auto-Tune, it was not yet available when the song was recorded and mastered. Rasted said that Nystrøm naturally portrayed the high-pitched Barbie voice in the studio.

== Content ==
As critics such as Larry Flick and David Browne summarized, "Barbie Girl" is a Balearic-tinged Europop, Euro-dance and dance-pop novelty song where Nystrøm, in a squeaky high pitch as Barbie, satirizes the doll's inherent misogyny by excitedly talking about the inappropriate, unethical things some people secretly do with a Barbie doll. René, as a leery Ken, serves as a "equally playful and biting" counterpart to Barbie.

== Critical reception ==
"Barbie Girl" received acclaim from publications such as People Magazine, who called it "the year's best novelty record, a cartoonish anthem you'll need surgery to remove from your head". 5/5 scores and Single of the Week honors were given to the song by publications such as the Irish Times, who called it "a supreme slice of cheese which out-hums even the mighty Whigfield" and saying that Aqua had "hit the perfect wally beat, and this awful tune is set to dominate the dance-floor and do kinky things to it." The Scottish Daily Record stated, "Love them or hate them, you have to admit Aqua's silly doll song is pure pop and the video is great, too".

== Commercial performance ==
"Barbie Girl" has sold more than eight million copies worldwide. Stalling at number two in the band's native Denmark, the song was a sales chart topper in the entire continent of Europe and more than ten countries. In the United Kingdom, it debuted on the UK Singles Chart at number two and reached number one the next week, on 26 October 1997. It stayed at that position for four weeks and has sold and streamed 2.4 million units in the United Kingdom as of September 2023. On the US Billboard Hot 100, one of few records to combine airplay and sales, it debuted at number seven; it sold 82,000 copies in its first week and debuted at number five on the Hot 100's component chart for sales, Hot Singles Sales.

"Barbie Girl" was part of a mid-to-late-1990s trend of popular music coming from Scandinavian acts like Sweden's Ace of Base and the Cardigans that Jeremy Helligar labeled as "fun, fun, fun—but oh so disposable". Critics from Music Week and Record Mirror attributed the commercial success to its "mix of perky vocals, barbed lyrics and infectious energy", as well as its "irresistible video".

== Legacy ==
In later decades, critics remember "Barbie Girl" as one of the best songs of the 1990s, as well as one of the decade's best dance and eurodance songs. Of all-time, Billboard ranked "Barbie Girl" number 220 in their list of the 500 best pop songs, and a VH1 one-hit wonder countdown ranked it number 88. Stephen Thomas Erlewine from AllMusic called "Barbie Girl" an inexplicable pop culture phenomena. While post-modern irony had been a staple of popular culture throughout the 1990s up to "Barbie Girl"'s release, the song was popular music's introduction to it. Andrew Unterberger of Billboard, who ranked "Barbie Girl" the ninth-best song of 1997 in 2017, called it a cartoon version of "Supermodel" (1995) by Jill Sobule, the theme of the teen comedy film Clueless (1995). The song has also become an "absolutely transcendent karaoke" staple, attributed by Unterberger to its "absurd male-female vocals and Babelfished-sounding lyrics".

== Music video ==
The music video for "Barbie Girl" was directed by Danish directors Peder Pedersen and Peter Stenbæk, and depicts the band members in different scenes that a Barbie doll would be in. It has Nystrøm dressed as various Barbie dolls skulking around her swimming pool at home after Dif, dressed as Barbie's love interest Ken, accidentally pulls her arm off. The video was also the number one most requested video in the US, having shot from 30 to number one on the US channel The Box. The video was uploaded to their official YouTube channel in August 2010 and reached 1 billion views in February 2022.

== Controversies ==
=== Mattel lawsuit ===
In September 1997, six months after the release of the song by Aqua, Mattel, the toy manufacturer of the Barbie doll line, sued MCA Records, Aqua's North American record label. The company claimed that "Barbie Girl" violated their trademark and turned the doll into a sex object, and referred to her as a "blonde bimbo". Their case also alleged that the song infringed its copyrights and trademarks on the Barbie doll and that the lyrics had ruined the longtime popularity and reputation of their trademark, impinging on their marketing plan. Aqua and MCA Records claimed that Mattel injected their own meanings into the song's lyrics, contesting Mattel's claims and countersuing for defamation, after Mattel had likened MCA to a "bank robber". The lawsuit filed by Mattel was ultimately dismissed by the lower courts, with this dismissal upheld and a certiorari petition denied by the Supreme Court of the United States.

In 2002, the U.S. Court of Appeals for the Ninth Circuit ruled that the song was protected as a parody under the trademark doctrine of nominative use and the First Amendment to the United States Constitution; Judge Alex Kozinski also threw out the defamation lawsuit that MCA Records filed against Mattel, concluding his ruling thus: "The parties are advised to chill." The case was dismissed.

In 2009, as part of a marketing strategy to revive sales, Mattel released a series of advertisements and a promotional music video featuring the song, with modified lyrics. In 2023, with the global release of the Mattel-produced film Barbie (starring Margot Robbie and Ryan Gosling as Barbie and Ken), a new song entitled "Barbie World" (performed by rappers Nicki Minaj and Ice Spice) was included on the film's soundtrack.

=== Eurovision Song Contest 2001 ===
As the interval act during the Eurovision Song Contest 2001, Aqua performed a medley of their singles along with percussion ensemble Safri Duo. There were several complaints due to the profanity used during the performance, both at the beginning and end of "Barbie Girl".

== Track listings ==
- Danish and European CD and cassette single
1. "Barbie Girl" (radio edit) – 3:16
2. "Barbie Girl" (extended version) – 5:14
- UK CD1
1. "Barbie Girl" (radio edit) – 3:16
2. "Barbie Girl" (extended version) – 5:14
3. "Barbie Girl" (Perky Park club mix) – 6:13
4. "Barbie Girl" (Spike's Anatomically Correct dub) – 7:55
- UK CD2
1. "Barbie Girl" (CD-ROM video)
2. "Barbie Girl" (radio edit)
3. "Barbie Girl" (Dirty Rotten Scoundrels 12-inch G-String mix)
4. "Barbie Girl" (Dirty Rotten Peroxide radio mix)
- US CD and cassette single
1. "Barbie Girl" (radio edit) – 3:16
- US, Canadian, and Australian maxi-CD single
1. "Barbie Girl" (radio edit) – 3:16
2. "Barbie Girl" (Spike's Plastic mix) – 8:44
3. "Barbie Girl" (Spike's Anatomically Correct dub) – 7:55
4. "Barbie Girl" (extended version) – 5:14
- US 12-inch single

A1. "Barbie Girl" (Spike's Plastic mix) – 8:44
A2. "Barbie Girl" (radio edit) – 3:16
B1. "Barbie Girl" (Spike's Anatomically Correct dub) – 7:55
B2. "Barbie Girl" (extended version) – 5:14

- Remix digital download
1. "Barbie Girl" (Tiësto remix) – 2:35
2. "Barbie Girl" (original mix) – 3:17

== Credits ==
Credits are adapted from liner notes of the "Barbie Girl" CD single and Aquarium.

- Written by Claus Norreen, Lene Nystrøm, René Dif, and Søren Rasted
- Performed by Norreen, Rasted
- Vocals by Nystrøm, Dif
- Hair and make-up by Fjodor Øxenhave
- Styling by Aqua, Bjarne Lindgreen
- Artwork by Peter Stenbæk
- Photo by Robin Skoldborg
- Produced, arranged, and mixed by Norreen, Jam, Delgado, Rasted

== Charts ==
=== Weekly charts ===
1997 weekly chart performance for "Barbie Girl"
Chart (1997)	Peak position
Australia (ARIA)	1
Austria (Ö3 Austria Top 40)	2
Belgium (Ultratop 50 Flanders)	1
Belgium (Ultratop 50 Wallonia)	1
Canada Top Singles (RPM)	4
Canada Dance/Urban (RPM)	1
Canada (Nielsen SoundScan)	7
Denmark (IFPI)	2
Estonia (Eesti Top 20)	6
Europe (Eurochart Hot 100)	1
Europe Airplay (European Radio Top 50)	10
Europe Border Breakers (Music & Media)	1
Finland (Suomen virallinen lista)	3
France (SNEP)	1
Germany (GfK)	1
Hungary (Mahasz)	4
Iceland (Íslenski Listinn Topp 40)	15
Ireland (IRMA)	1
Israel (Israeli Singles Chart)	1
Italy (FIMI)	2
Italy Airplay (Music & Media)	4
Netherlands (Dutch Top 40)	1
Netherlands (Single Top 100)	2
New Zealand (Recorded Music NZ)	1
Norway (VG-lista)	1
Scottish Singles Sales (Official Charts)	1
Spain (AFYVE)	2
Sweden (Sverigetopplistan)	1
Switzerland (Schweizer Hitparade)	1
UK Singles (Official Charts)	1
UK Airplay (Music Control UK)	15
US Billboard Hot 100	7
US Dance Club Songs (Billboard)	21
US Dance Singles Sales (Billboard)	2
US Pop Airplay (Billboard)	15
US Rhythmic Airplay (Billboard)	8

2017 weekly chart performance for "Barbie Girl"
Chart (2017)	Peak position
UK Vinyl (Official Charts)	23

2023 weekly chart performance for "Barbie Girl"
Chart (2023)	Peak position
France (SNEP)	61
Global 200 (Billboard)	77
Ireland Sales+Streaming (Irish Singles Chart)	41
Italy Dance Airplay (EarOne) Tiësto remix	15
UK Sales+Streaming (UK Singles Chart)	40
US Digital Song Sales (Billboard)	19
US Dance Streaming Songs (Billboard)	3

=== Year-end charts ===
1997 year-end chart performance for "Barbie Girl"
Chart (1997)	Position
Australia (ARIA)	2
Austria (Ö3 Austria Top 40)	11
Belgium (Ultratop 50 Flanders)	2
Belgium (Ultratop 50 Wallonia)	2
Brazil Airplay (Crowley)	22
Canada Top Singles (RPM)	67
Canada Dance/Urban (RPM)	5
Europe (Eurochart Hot 100)	4
France (SNEP)	5
Germany (Media Control)	8
Iceland (Íslenski Listinn Topp 40)	99
Israel (Israeli Singles Chart)	1
Italy (Musica e dischi)	9
Netherlands (Dutch Top 40)	3
Netherlands (Single Top 100)	4
New Zealand (RIANZ)	49
Norway (VG-lista)	9
Romania Airplay (Romanian Top 100)	19
Sweden (Topplistan)	5
Switzerland (Schweizer Hitparade)	34
UK Singles (Official Charts)	2
US Billboard Hot 100	94
US Maxi-Singles Sales (Billboard)	37
US Rhythmic Top 40 (Billboard)	62
US Top 40/Mainstream (Billboard)	74

1998 year-end chart performance for "Barbie Girl"
Chart (1998)	Position
Europe (Eurochart Hot 100)	15
France (SNEP)	33
Germany (Media Control)	45
Italy (Musica e dischi)	85
Netherlands (Dutch Top 40)	189
Netherlands (Single Top 100)	96
Switzerland (Schweizer Hitparade)	19
UK Singles (Official Charts)	139

=== Decade-end charts ===
Decade-end chart performance for "Barbie Girl"
Chart (1990–1999)	Position
Austria (Ö3 Austria Top 40)	67
Belgium (Ultratop 50 Flanders)	2
Netherlands (Dutch Top 40)	27

=== All-time charts ===
All-time chart performance for "Barbie Girl"
Chart	Position
UK Singles (Official Charts)	16

== Certifications and sales ==
Certifications and sales for "Barbie Girl"
Region	Certification	Certified units/sales
Australia (ARIA)	3× Platinum	210,000^{^}
Austria (IFPI Austria)	Platinum	50,000^{*}
Belgium (BRMA)	4× Platinum	200,000^{*}
Denmark (IFPI Danmark)	Platinum	90,000^{‡}
France (SNEP)	Diamond	750,000^{*}
Germany (BVMI)	Platinum	500,000^{^}
Italy	—	100,000
Italy (FIMI) sales since 2009	Platinum	100,000^{‡}
Netherlands (NVPI)	Platinum	75,000^{^}
New Zealand (RMNZ)	2× Platinum	60,000^{‡}
Norway (IFPI Norway)	2× Platinum	
Spain (Promusicae)	Platinum	60,000^{‡}
Sweden (GLF)	3× Platinum	90,000^{^}
Switzerland (IFPI Switzerland)	Platinum	50,000^{^}
United Kingdom (BPI)	4× Platinum	2,400,000^{‡}
United States (RIAA)	3× Platinum	3,000,000^{‡}
Summaries
Worldwide	—	8,000,000
^{*} Sales figures based on certification alone.^{^} Shipments figures based on certification alone.^{‡} Sales+streaming figures based on certification alone.

== Release history ==
Release dates and formats for "Barbie Girl"
Region	Date	Format(s)	Label(s)	Ref(s).
Denmark	April 1997	CD	Universal	
Europe	14 May 1997	CD	Universal	
United States	12 August 1997	Rhythmic contemporary; contemporary hit radio	MCA	
United States	19 August 1997	12-inch vinyl; CD; cassette	MCA	
Japan	21 August 1997	CD	Universal	
United Kingdom	13 October 1997	CD; cassette	Universal	

== Cover versions and parodies ==
The song has been covered by several artists over the years. Alternative metal band Faith No More covered the song live in 1997 during their Album of the Year Tour. Identical twin sisters Amanda and Samantha Marchant, better known as Samanda, released their cover of the song on 8 October 2007, and it entered the UK Singles Chart at number 26. Girls' Generation's Jessica Jung covered this song as her solo performance during the first Asian concert tour Into the New World. The Swedish artist Loke Nyberg did a new version of this song for the Swedish radio show Morgonpasset. He interprets the song as criticism of today's beauty ideals. In 2013, Ludacris sampled the song in his single "Party Girls" featuring Wiz Khalifa, Jeremih and Cashmere Cat. In 2016, Caramella Girls released a version called "Candy Girl" on iTunes, as well as a YouTube music video. The most recent rendition of the song was recorded by Ice Spice and Nicki Minaj, accompanied by Aqua, titled "Barbie World". The track was released as the fourth single on the official Barbie soundtrack Barbie the Album in June 2023, ahead of the film's release on 21 July 2023.

There are also many parodies of the song, including a parody called "Ugly Girl", with an unverified author (often wrongly credited to "Weird Al" Yankovic, Adam Henderson, or Jack Off Jill). German duo Lynne & Tessa made a lip-synched Internet video of the song in 2006, and on British Indian sketch comedy show Goodness Gracious Me, where a version titled "Punjabi Girl" was featured in the radio series and later on television, performed by Asifa Lahore. In 2012, the song was parodied in an Australian lamb advertising campaign, relying on the Australian use of the term "barbie" to refer to the outdoor barbecue popularly held in Australia. The advertisement starred Melissa Tkautz and Sam Kekovich. In 2014, the song was used in the South Park season 18 episode "Cock Magic". Ava Max recorded a version with new lyrics, titled "Not Your Barbie Girl", for her album Heaven & Hell in 2018.

=== Kelly Key version ===
"Barbie Girl"

Single by Kelly Key

from the album Kelly Key
- Released: 15 August 2005
- Recorded: 2004
- Length: 3:19
- Label: Warner
- Songwriters: Claus Norreen; Søren Nystrøm Rasted; Gustavo Lins; Humberto Tavares
- Producer: DJ Cuca

Kelly Key singles chronology
"Escuta Aqui Rapaz" (2005)	"Barbie Girl" (2005)	"Papinho" (2005)

In 2005, Brazilian recording artist Kelly Key recorded a version in Portuguese for her third studio album Kelly Key, which was released as the album's second single on 15 August 2005. Key said she loved the song and wanted to cover it as a tribute to the original, stating: "I've loved this song ever since I heard it. I made a point of recording it, without worrying about whether it was for my audience or not."

"Barbie Girl" received generally negative reviews from music critics. Vinícius Versiani Durães of IMHO felt it was humorous and would later become a hit. Marcos Paulo Bin of Universo Musical commented that the song was significantly different from her previous releases, which were known for explicit lyrics, but ultimately give it a positive review. Rodrigo Ortega of Pilula Pop said "Barbie Girl" was sensational and funny, calling it the best song on the album. He also stated that Key should have released "Escuta Aqui Rapaz" as her first single because "the song was boring", but "Barbie Girl" saved the album. Carlos Eduardo Lima of Scream & Yell said the song was "childish, silly and boring" and killed Kelly Key's status as a sex symbol.

The music video for "Barbie Girl" was directed by Ricardo Vereza, Bidu Madio, Rentz and Mauricio Eça. It was filmed on 17 and 18 August, later premiering on 30 August. The video features Key playing a determined and feminist woman.

A YouTube video of Czech model Dominika Myslivcová lip syncing to the song became a viral video worldwide. Due to its success, it has often been wrongly attributed to Myslivcová.

==== Track listing ====
1. "Barbie Girl" – 3:20
2. "Barbie Girl" (Cuca Mix) – 5:12
3. "Barbie Girl" (Music video) – 3:23

==== Release history ====
Region	Date	Format	Label
Brazil	15 August 2005	Mainstream radio	Warner Music

== References in media ==
Environmental movements, like Fridays for Future, when trying to bring attention to the heavy amounts of plastic thrown by humans into the seas, have referred the song lyrics in their slogans with the words "Life in plastic is not fantastic".

In 2022, British singer Tom Aspaul named his album Life in Plastic after a line from the song.
