= Aqua (band) =

Danish eurodance group

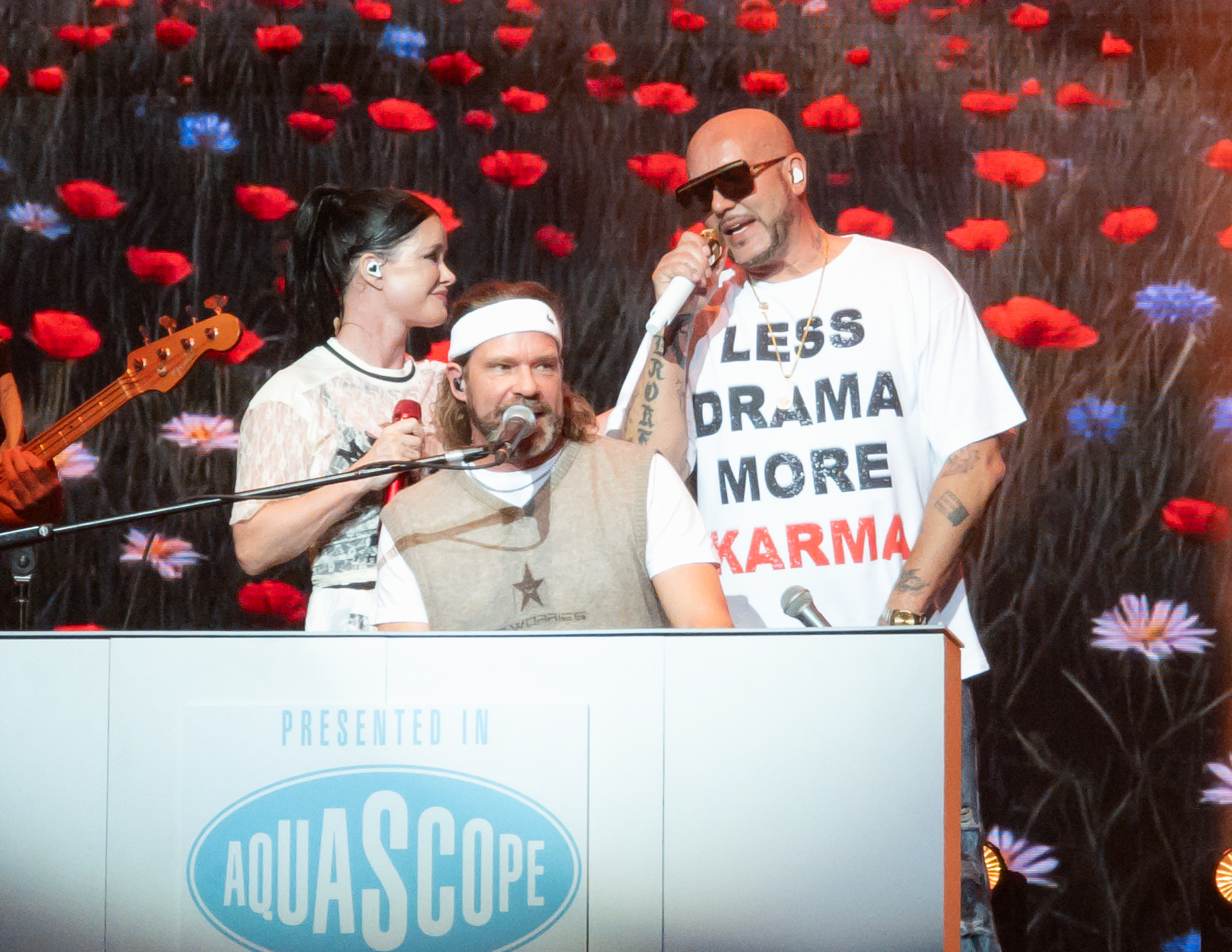
- The core members of Aqua in 2025; from left: Nystrøm, Rasted, and Dif

Background information
- Also known as: Joyspeed (1995)
- Origin: Copenhagen, Denmark
- Genres: Pop; dance-pop; bubblegum pop; Europop; Eurodance
- Years active: 1995–2001; 2007–2012; 2016–2026
- Labels: Universal Music Denmark; MCA; Mercury; Geffen
- Spinoffs: Lazyboy; Hej Matematik
- Past members: Claus Norreen; René Dif; Søren Rasted; Lene Nystrøm
- Website: aquaofficial.com

Aqua was a Danish-Norwegian eurodance band, best known for their 1997 single "Barbie Girl". The group formed in 1995 in Copenhagen and achieved international success around the world in the late 1990s and early 2000s. The band released three albums: Aquarium in 1997, Aquarius in 2000 and Megalomania in 2011. The group sold an estimated 33 million albums and singles, making them the most profitable Danish band ever.

The group managed to top the UK Singles Chart with three of their singles. The group also caused controversy with the double entendres in their "Barbie Girl" single, with Mattel filing a lawsuit against the group. The lawsuit was finally dismissed by a judge in 2002, who ruled "The parties are advised to chill".

The band's members are vocalists René Dif and Lene Nystrøm, keyboardist Søren Rasted, and guitarist Claus Norreen. During their hiatus, Nystrøm, Dif and Rasted all achieved solo chart success, while Norreen remixed other artists' material. The band broke up again in 2026.

== Career and history ==
=== 1995: Formation ===
In 1993, Søren Rasted and Claus Norreen won a contest and were hired to produce a soundtrack for a film titled Frække Frida og de frygtløse spioner. At that time, René Dif was working as a club DJ; he was hired for some of the songs. A few months after the film was released, Dif met Lene Nystrøm who was singing on the Norway–Denmark ferry, M/S Peter Wessel. They began dating, and the trio later hired her as to be the lead singer of Joyspeed. The formation of Joyspeed was on the basis that both Norreen and Rasted would do the production for the group, with Dif rapping and Nystrøm performing the main vocals. A Swedish record label signed them in 1995, and their first single "Itzy Bitzy Spider" was released in Sweden. The single was a commercial failure, and after one week at the lower end of the Swedish charts, it disappeared completely. The four canceled their contract with the record label.

=== 1996–1998: Aquarium and international breakthrough ===
With a new manager and no record deal, the group started over. The four began to produce and write songs in a different style, attracting the attention of major label Universal Music Denmark. They renamed themselves Aqua, choosing the name seen on a poster in their dressing room, and accepted Universal Music Denmark's offer of a recording contract in 1996. The group's first release under their new name was "Roses Are Red", a dance song with a bubblegum pop sound. It was released in Denmark in September 1996, and stayed in the charts for over two months, eventually selling enough copies to be certified platinum. The success of the single was further proven when Aqua received a nomination for "Best Danish Dance Act", although the group did not win.

Their follow-up single in February 1997 followed the same style. Titled "My Oh My", the single broke all Danish sales records by being certified gold within six days. The single went straight to number one in Denmark, and made Aqua a household name in the country. Aqua released their debut album Aquarium in Denmark on 26 March 1997. The album contained 11 tracks, including their first two singles and their then-upcoming third single "Barbie Girl". Universal Music Group had by now begun to market the group in other countries, releasing "Roses Are Red" in Japan in February 1997 and in various countries across Europe. The single had proven popular everywhere it was sold, convincing Universal that the group could be an international success.

Aqua released their third single "Barbie Girl" in May 1997. The song, at first glance, appears to be about the Barbie doll. However, at a second glance, the song contains several sexual overtones, such as "You can brush my hair, undress me everywhere", "You can touch, you can play", and "Kiss me here, touch me there, hanky-panky." Despite complaints about the double meanings in "Barbie Girl", Universal Music released the single around the world in 1997. The release was highly successful, making number one in the United Kingdom for four weeks, in Australia for three weeks, and making the top ten of the Billboard Hot 100, something rarely achieved at the time by European pop acts.

Aqua's follow-up to "Barbie Girl" in Australia, Canada and the United Kingdom was "Doctor Jones", although another single, "Lollipop (Candyman)", was released in the United States through MCA Records. "Doctor Jones" entered at number one in several countries, including the United Kingdom, where it stayed at the top spot for two weeks, and Australia, where it spent seven weeks at No. 1. "Lollipop (Candyman)" became the group's second Top 40 hit in the US, peaking at No. 23 on the Billboard Hot 100. The song peaked at No. 3 in Australia. In Japan both songs were released as a double A-side, and achieved reasonable success in the singles chart.

"Doctor Jones" was followed up by "Turn Back Time". The song was featured on the soundtrack to the film Sliding Doors, and achieved a large amount of radio and video airplay. The song became their third single to make it to number one in the United Kingdom. Elsewhere, the song also performed well, including reaching No. 10 in Australia.

Aqua's second Danish single, "My Oh My", was rereleased in August 1998. The single was also released in several other European countries where it had not been released initially. Following the release of "Good Morning Sunshine", which achieved limited success, Aqua concentrated on their second album, and on touring around Australia. The group also released a documentary on 1 December 1998 containing several live performances of songs from the Aquarium album and interviews with the members.

Lene Nystrøm was in 1998 awarded the "Special Price of the Jury" at the Norwegian music award Spellemannprisen for her contributions to Aqua in the year of 1997.

=== 1999–2006: Aquarius, lawsuit and split up ===
According to promotional interviews with the group, over 30 songs were recorded for Aquarius, out of which only twelve made it onto the final version. The group released their second album in February 2000. Aquarius contained several different musical styles. "Cartoon Heroes" was released as the first single, and sold well across Europe and Australia, reaching No. 1 in Denmark, No. 7 in the United Kingdom, and No. 16 in Australia. The follow-up single "Around the World" was released in June 2000, and peaked at No. 26 in the UK and No. 35 in Australia. It reached the top spot in Denmark. "Around the World" would be Aqua's final UK single release.

In December 2000, Mattel filed a lawsuit against the group's record label Mattel v. MCA Records, 296 F.3d 894 9th Cir. 2002, claiming that "Barbie Girl" had damaged the reputation of the Barbie brand. Judge Alex Kozinski, writing for the United States Court of Appeals for the Ninth Circuit, upheld the district court finding the use of Mattel's trademark in "Barbie Girl" fell within the non-commercial use exemption to the Federal Trademark Dilution Act. Judge Kozinski concluded his opinion by writing, "The parties are advised to chill."

Aqua released "Bumble Bees" as a single in Scandinavia, Europe and Australia, achieving reasonable success. "We Belong to the Sea" followed as a fourth single in fewer nations, failing to chart in most countries. Aqua spent the first few months of 2001 touring internationally, and working on material for their third album. The group also performed at the Eurovision Song Contest 2001, collaborating with the Safri Duo and providing the music during the voting stages of the competition. This performance also caused controversy, as a number of offensive phrases and gestures were added during the performance of "Barbie Girl" (which was involved in a major lawsuit). During a couple of low-key events in Denmark the group performed live versions of songs intended for inclusion on the third album, including "Couch Potato" and "Shakin' Stevens Is a Superstar", the latter a tribute to the 1980s performer Shakin' Stevens. Aqua split up in 2001.

=== 2007–2015: Reunion and Megalomania ===
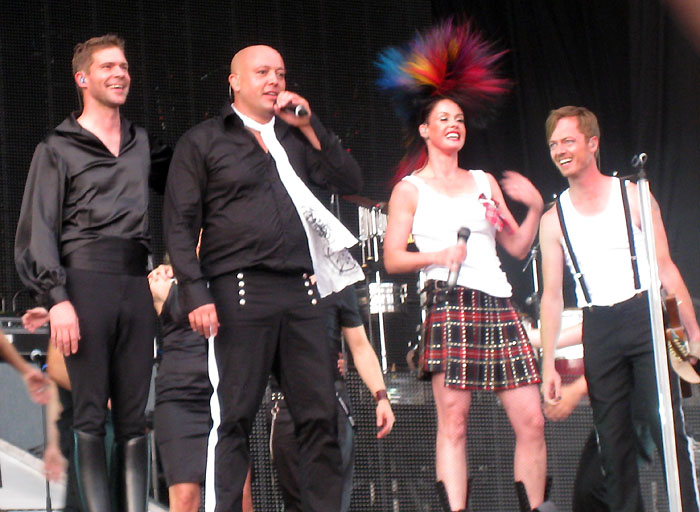
Aqua at the Grøn Koncert in 2008 (from left: Rasted, Dif, Nystrøm, Norreen)

Aqua reunited on 26 October 2007, and announced a Danish tour would commence in 2008. Aqua performed at the Grøn Koncert festival between 17 and 27 July 2008. Aqua released a greatest hits album on 15 June 2009, which includes 16 old remastered tracks and three new songs: "My Mamma Said", "Live Fast, Die Young", and "Back to the 80s". "Back to the 80s" debuted at number one in Denmark where it stayed for six weeks, becoming the band's fifth number-one single. It has since been certified platinum by the International Federation of the Phonographic Industry (IFPI) for sales of 30,000 copies in Denmark. Aqua has also toured Scandinavia between May and August 2009 and performed at several gigs in Germany, United Kingdom and France. The greatest hits album was released in North America and many European countries on 22 September 2009 and in the UK on 29 September 2009.

Aqua commenced the recording of Megalomania at the beginning of 2010, scheduled for a release in the spring of 2011. Aqua released the album's lead single, "How R U Doin?", on 14 March 2011, after a preview of the song was posted onto the band's official Facebook page on 10 March 2011. Co-written by Thomas Troelsen, the song peaked at number four in Denmark, becoming the band's tenth top-ten single. It has since been certified gold by the International Federation of the Phonographic Industry for sales of 15,000 copies in Denmark. Aqua were originally set to release their third studio album on 14 July 2011, however the release was pushed back to 5 September 2011 with the record label citing bad timing. The album, titled Megalomania, was then further rescheduled to be released on 3 October 2011. On 7 September 2011, Aqua released a preview of their new single, "Playmate to Jesus", on their official Facebook page, which was released on 12 September 2011. On 8 September 2011, it was announced that "Like a Robot" would also be released as a single on 12 September, and would battle against "Playmate to Jesus" in the charts. After the moderate chart success of Megalomania in Denmark, an expanded version of the band featuring all four original members (Lene Nystrøm Rasted, René Dif, Søren Rasted, Claus Norreen), plus new additions Niels Lykke Munksgaard Rasmussen (guitar) Frederik Thaae (bass) and Morten Hellborn (drums), toured Australia in March 2012. They initially announced six concerts but quickly added three additional shows to Melbourne, Sydney and Perth (Fremantle) due to popular demand. Aqua appeared on Sunrise, an Australian morning TV show on the Seven Network. They performed a slower tempo acoustic version of "Barbie Girl" and it was revealed that Lene had pneumonia, but the concerts would proceed as the group prided themselves on never having cancelled a show. They then appeared on the Seven Network's The Morning Show, performing "Doctor Jones". After the tour, the band split again. In 2014, the band announced a tour in Australia and New Zealand.

=== 2016–2026: Second reunion with "Barbie World" and disbandment ===
In September 2016, it was announced that Aqua will perform "at least 10 concerts" as part of the Vi Elsker 90'erne ("We Love the '90s") music festival. It was the first time Aqua performed live in Denmark since 2011. On 20 September 2016, Aqua announced that Claus Norreen would not return to the group. Norreen said in a statement that his "musical focus" has changed and that he no longer desires to tour with Aqua, but still considers the remaining members of Aqua "his family".

On 29 May 2018, Aqua announced "The Rewind Tour" in Canada, with fellow 1990s acts Prozzäk and Whigfield. In June 2018, Aqua released their single called "Rookie".

In July 2021, the band released a cover of "I Am What I Am" for Copenhagen Pride 2021.

On 29 April 2022, during a concert in Tivoli, Copenhagen, the band announced that they would be going on a tour that would continue through 2023.

In 2023, Aqua was sampled by Nicki Minaj and Ice Spice on the song "Barbie World", for the soundtrack of the film Barbie. The song debuted at number seven on the Billboard Hot 100, becoming Aqua's second single to enter the Top 10, and their first since "Barbie Girl". "Barbie World" also reached the Top 5 in the UK Singles Chart, in the same week that "Barbie Girl" returned to the UK Top 40 for the first time in 25 years.

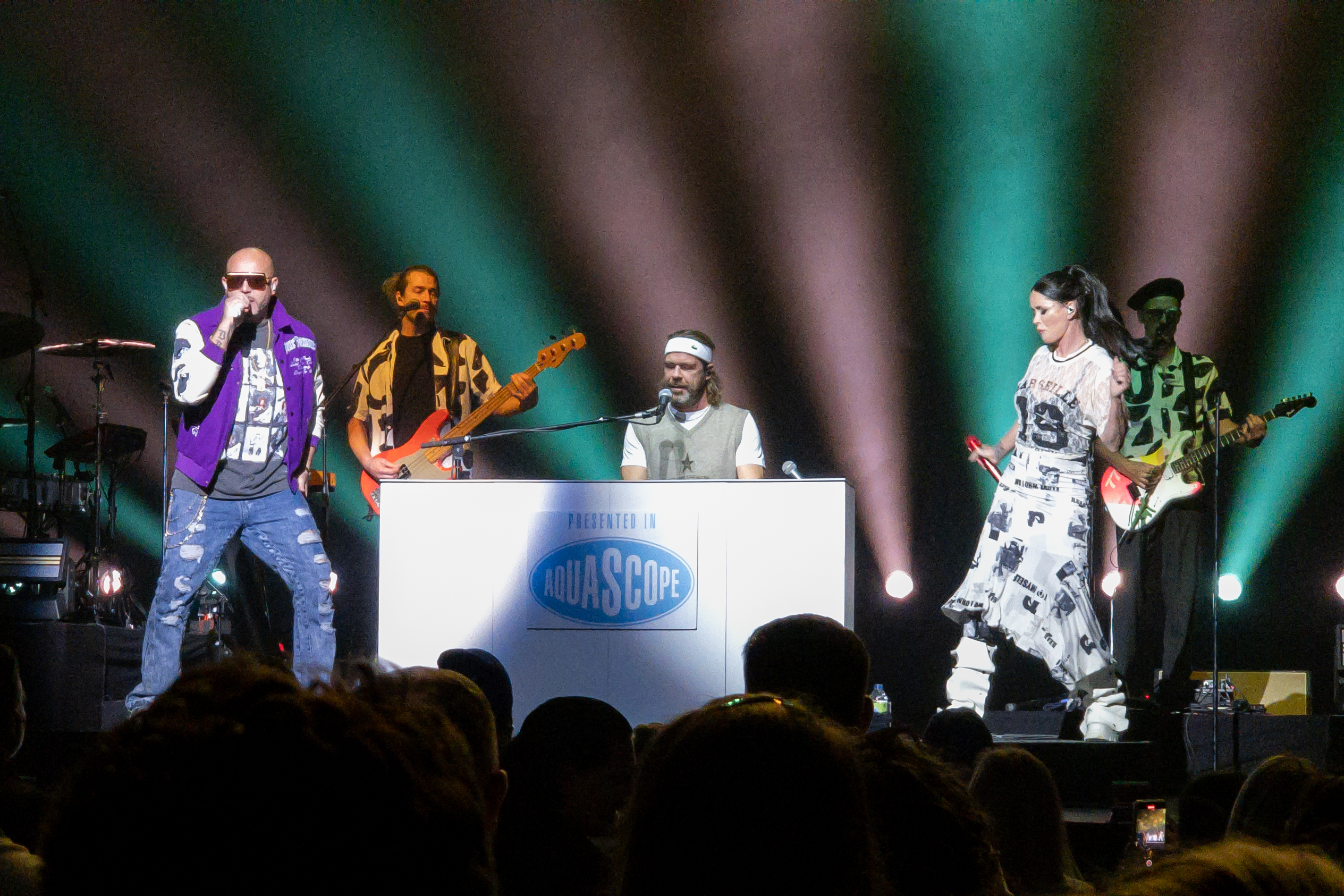
Aqua during their 2025 tour

"Barbie World" debuted at number seven on the US Billboard Hot 100, becoming Minaj's 23rd, Ice Spice's fourth, and Aqua's second top-ten hit. Elsewhere, the single also reached the top ten in Australia, Austria, Canada, Denmark, Germany, Greece, Luxembourg, Ireland, New Zealand, Norway, Poland, South Africa, Sweden, Switzerland and the United Kingdom, top twenty in Iceland, Finland, France and Hungary, top thirty in Czech Republic and Lithuania, top forty in Belgium and Slovakia and top fifty in Portugal and Italy. The song also earned Aqua their first Grammy nominations.

In 2025, it was announced that Aqua the Musical, featuring the group's music and story, will premiere in 2028 in Copenhagen at The Royal Opera House. It will be directed by Thomas Agerholm and was written by playwrights Claus Reenberg, Mads Æbeløe, and Nikolaj Tarp, with scenography by Benjamin La Cour.

On 18 May 2026, the group announced on social media that they were breaking up, this one being their third split.

== Awards and nominations ==
| Year | Awards | Work | Category | Result | Ref. |
|---|---|---|---|---|---|
| 1997 | IFPI Platinum Europe Awards | Aquarium | Award Level 1 | Won | |
| 1997 | Billboard Music Video Awards | "Barbie Girl" | Best New Artist Clip (Pop/Rock) | Nominated | |
| 1997 | GAFFA Awards (Denmark) | "Barbie Girl" | Best Danish Hit | Won | |
| 1997 | GAFFA Awards (Denmark) | "Doctor Jones" | Best Danish Hit | Nominated | |
| 1997 | GAFFA Awards (Denmark) | Aquarium | Best Danish Album | Nominated | |
| 1997 | GAFFA Awards (Denmark) | Lene Nystrøm | Best Danish Female Act | Nominated | |
| 1997 | GAFFA Awards (Denmark) | Themselves | Best Danish Group | Nominated | |
| 1997 | GAFFA Awards (Denmark) | Themselves | Best Danish New Act | Won | |
| 1997 | GAFFA Awards (Denmark) | Themselves | Mest håbløse danske | Won | |
| 1998 | GAFFA Awards (Denmark) | "Turn Back Time" | Best Danish Video | Nominated | |
| 1998 | GAFFA Awards (Denmark) | Themselves | Best Danish Group | Nominated | |
| 1998 | Danish Music Awards | Themselves | Årets Danske Gruppe | Won | |
| 1998 | Danish Music Awards | Themselves | Årets Nye Danske Navn | Won | |
| 1998 | Danish Music Awards | Themselves | Grøn Pris | Won | |
| 1998 | Danish Music Awards | Themselves | P3's Lytterpris | Won | |
| 1998 | Danish Music Awards | "Barbie Girl" | Årets Danske Hit | Won | |
| 1998 | Danish Music Awards | "Barbie Girl" | Årets Danske Musikvideo | Won | |
| 1998 | Danish Music Awards | Aquarium | Årets Danske Pop Udgivelse | Won | |
| 1998 | IFPI Platinum Europe Awards | Aquarium | Award Level 4 | Won | |
| 1998 | Juno Awards | Aquarium | Best Selling Album (Foreign or Domestic) | Nominated | |
| 1998 | NME Awards | "Barbie Girl" | Worst Single | Won | |
| 1998 | TMF Awards | "Barbie Girl" | Best Video International | Won | |
| 1998 | TMF Awards | Themselves | Best Newcomer International | Won | |
| 1998 | MTV Europe Music Awards | Themselves | Best New Act | Nominated | |
| 1998 | MTV Europe Music Awards | Themselves | Best Pop | Nominated | |
| 1998 | Music Television Awards | Themselves | Best Pop | Nominated | |
| 1998 | Music Television Awards | Themselves | Best Breakthrough | Nominated | |
| 1998 | World Music Awards | Themselves | World's Best-Selling Scandinavian Artist | Won | |
| 1999 | ECHO Awards | Themselves | Best International Group | Nominated | |
| 1999 | Hungarian Music Awards | Aquarium | Best Foreign Pop Album | Nominated | |
| 2000 | TMF Awards | "Cartoon Heroes" | Best Video International | Won | |
| 2000 | IFPI Platinum Europe Awards | Aquarius | Award Level 1 | Won | |
| 2001 | World Music Awards | Themselves | World's Best-Selling Scandinavian Artist | Won | |
| 2001 | Danish Music Awards | Themselves | Eksportprisen | Won | |
| 2001 | Danish Music Awards | Aquarius | Årets Danske Pop Udgivelse | Won | |
| 2024 | Grammy Awards | "Barbie World" | Best Rap Song | Nominated | |
| 2024 | Grammy Awards | "Barbie World" | Best Song Written for Visual Media | Nominated | |

== Members ==
Final line-up

- René Dif – vocals (1995–2001, 2007–2012, 2016–2026)
- Søren Rasted – keyboards, piano, guitar, bongos, backing vocals (1995–2001, 2007–2012, 2016–2026)
- Lene Nystrøm – vocals (1995–2001, 2007–2012, 2016–2026)

Former members

- Claus Norreen – keyboards, piano, guitar, bongos, backing vocals (1995–2001, 2007–2012, 2016)

Touring members

- Steffen Drak Andersen – guitar, keyboards, backing vocals (2016–2026)

== Discography ==
- Aquarium (1997)
- Aquarius (2000)
- Megalomania (2011)

== See also ==
- Barbie

| Preceded by Once Upon a Time Europe Was Covered With Ice | Eurovision Song Contest; Final Interval act 2001 | Succeeded by Annely Peebo; Marko Matvere |
