= Peder Pedersen (director) =

Danish film director (born 1971)

Peder Pedersen (born 26 April 1971) is a Danish film director, best known for his humorous music videos, commercials and animated shorts.

Since 1996 he has directed over 400 commercials for international brands such as Kellogg's, Carlsberg, Lego, McDonald's, Bayer and Panasonic, as well as appr. 35 music videos for such bands as The Raveonettes, VETO, Superheroes and Aqua.

Barbie Girl and his other cheerful, cartoony music videos for Aqua helped fuel the wave of bubblegum dance pop music.

In 2008 he worked on Lego / Indiana Jones mini-epic, Lego Indiana Jones and the Raiders of the Lost Brick (2008). It led to the follow-ups Lego Star Wars: The Quest for R2-D2 (2009) and Lego Star Wars: Bombad Bounty (2010).

He has received several nominations and awards for his commercials at Cannes Lions etc. and is the director with most wins and most nominations for Best Music Video at the Danish Music Awards (previously called Dansk Grammy).

Peder Pedersen has also directed the documentary-films When the Music’s Over – i Jim Morrisons fodspor (1996) and Kontrol: P-vagten (1999), as well as many other short films in a variety of genres from horror and action to drama and comedy, including The End (1999), Code of Conduct (2001), Stille hjerte (2002) and Det hvide guld (2009). The latter won first prize at the 2009 BornShorts Film Festival.

He originally made a mark as publisher and editor of Inferno (1989–96), a Danish film journal dedicated to horror and science fiction films.

== Short films ==
- Friday the 13th the Final Chapter Part II (co-director) (1986)
- Mark Damon: Mission Matrix (co-director) (1986)
- Skriig (co-director) (1986)
- Schoolcamp Massacre (1988)
- Slut! (1991)
- Lykantrop (1991)
- En ulv i fåreklæder - bag kulisserne på Lykantrop (1991)
- Vågn op! (1993)
- Memoria (1993)
- Destination: Frihed (1993)
- When the Music’s Over – i Jim Morrisons fodspor (1997)
- The End (1999)
- Kontrol: P-vagten (1999)
- Code of Conduct (2001)
- Stille hjerte (2002)
- Lego Indiana Jones and the Raiders of the Lost Brick (2008)
- Det hvide guld (2009)
- Lego Star Wars: The Quest for R2-D2 (2009)
- Lego Star Wars: Bombad Bounty (2010)
- Lego City: Hot Chase (2011)
