= Lene Nystrøm =

Norwegian singer-songwriter

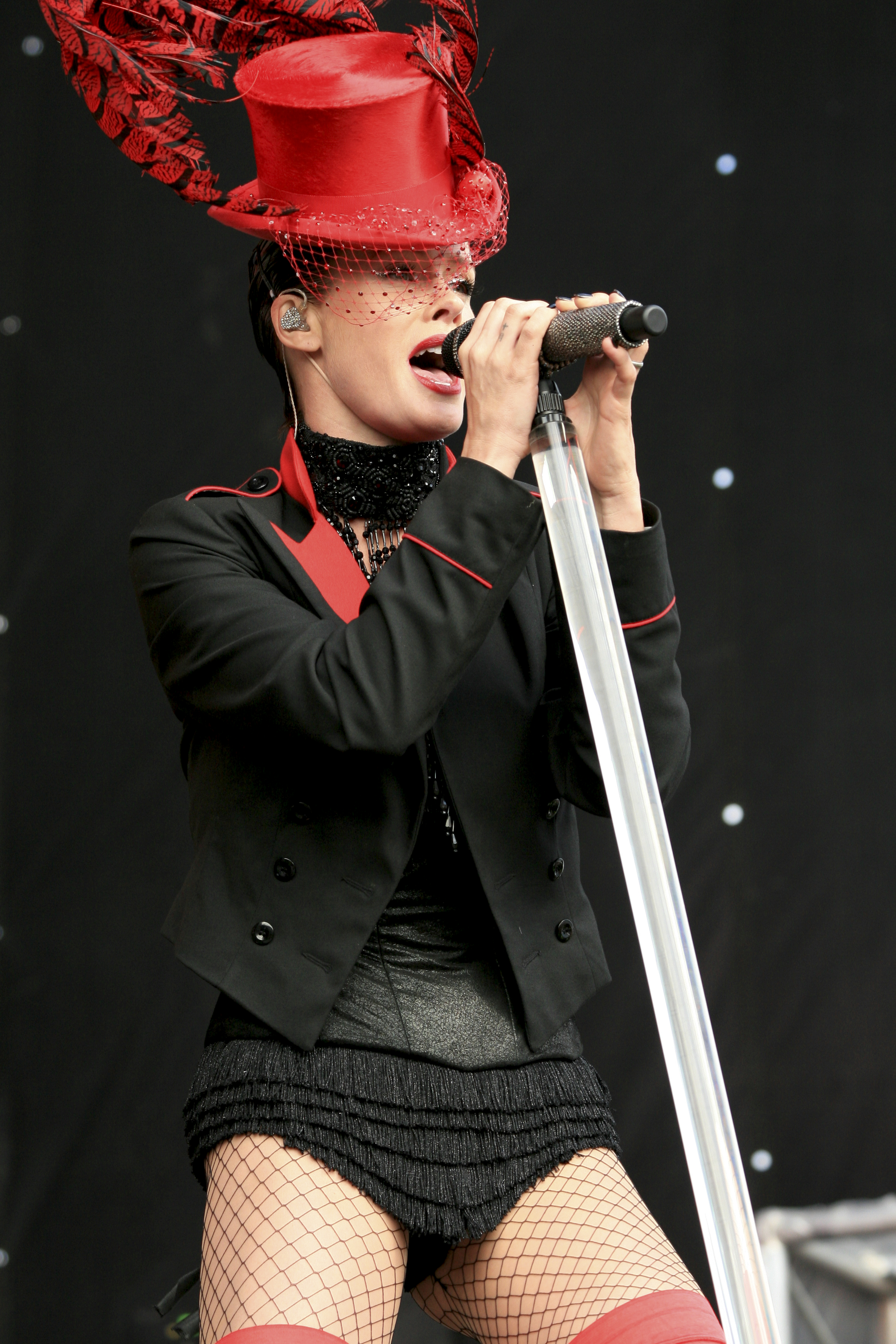
- Nystrøm performing in 2008

Background information
- Also known as: Lene; Aqua-Lene
- Born: Lene Grawford Nystrøm; 2 October 1973 (age 52); Tønsberg, Norway
- Genres: Pop; dance-pop; Eurodance; R&B
- Occupations: Musician; singer-songwriter
- Instrument: Vocals
- Years active: 1990–present
- Label: Polydor (2002–2004)
- Formerly of: Aqua

Lene Grawford Nystrøm (born 2 October 1973) is a Norwegian musician, singer-songwriter and actress who was the female lead vocalist of the Danish-Norwegian Eurodance group Aqua.

== Life and career ==
=== 1973–1994: Early life ===
Nystrøm was born in Tønsberg, Norway. When she was a teenager, she became interested in performing. She began modeling whilst also working as a bartender. From 1990 to 1993, she appeared on the Norwegian game show Casino, which aired on TVNorge.

=== 1994–2001: Aqua and Aquarium ===
In 1994, Nystrøm was working as a singer on the Norwegian cruise ship MS Peter Wessel and was spotted by musician René Dif. He recruited her as lead singer for the music group Joyspeed, later renamed Aqua. The group consisted of vocalists Nystrøm, Dif along with Søren Rasted and Claus Norreen. In 2001, the band split.

=== 2002–2006: Solo career and Play With Me ===
After the breakup of Aqua, Nystrøm continued as a soloist. In 2003, she released her first album Play with Me. It marked a change in her musical style, from the bubblegum sound of Aqua to a more R&B-influenced style. It reached number 30 on Denmark's Hitlisten chart and 74 on Norway's VG-lista chart. The album single "Virgin Superstar" was given some radio airplay, but did not chart and was not released. Her debut single "It's Your Duty" was released on 8 September. It peaked at number 3 on Denmark's Hitlisten chart and number 9 on Norway's VG-lista chart.

In 2004, she released the second single "Pretty Young Thing", a cover of Stella Soleil, which did not chart. She released a third and fourth single as limited vinyl promos of a cover version of "Here We Go", which originally was performed by Moonbaby, and "Scream" to DJs and radio stations. The song "We Wanna Party", which Nystrøm recorded and co-wrote with Xenomania, appeared on Girls Aloud's 2008 album Out of Control. Nystrøm and Xenomania co-wrote two more Girls Aloud songs, the tracks "No Good Advice" and "You Freak Me Out", which appeared on the Girls Aloud debut album Sound of the Underground. "No Good Advice" became a breakout hit for the group. In 2005, Nystrøm provided guest vocals on the LazyB single "I Love N.Y." and as part of charity project Giv Til Asien on the single Hvor små vi er, which peaked at number 1 at Danish single charts.

=== 2007–present: Aqua reunion ===
On 26 October 2007, Nystrøm reunited with the other members of Aqua. After fielding offers by record companies in Denmark, Canada, United States, and United Kingdom, they settled with an eight concert tour in Denmark as part of the 2008 Grøn Koncert festival. After the big success of the summer concert, Nystrøm continued with work with Aqua and released a new track, "Back to the 80s", on 25 May 2009. They released their greatest hits album on 15 June, which featured the track, along with sixteen remastered tracks and three other new songs, "My Mamma Said", "Spin Me a Christmas" and "Live Fast, Die Young". From May to August, they toured Scandinavia and performed at several gigs in Germany, the UK, and France.

The greatest hits CD was released in North America and many European countries on 22 September, and in the UK on 29 September. In 2009, Nystrøm had a major role in the 2009 film Deliver Us from Evil under Danish director Ole Bornedal. On 14 March 2011, Aqua released the single "How R U Doin?". They released the album Megalomania, on 3 October. She is one of the judges for Voice – Danmarks største stemme (Denmark's version of The Voice) which aired from November 2011 to February 2012 and also a judge in The Voice of Norway. Nystrøm acted in the movie Varg Veum – Cold Hearts (2012 film) as Varg Veum's girlfriend, whose profession was that of a social worker.

== Personal life ==
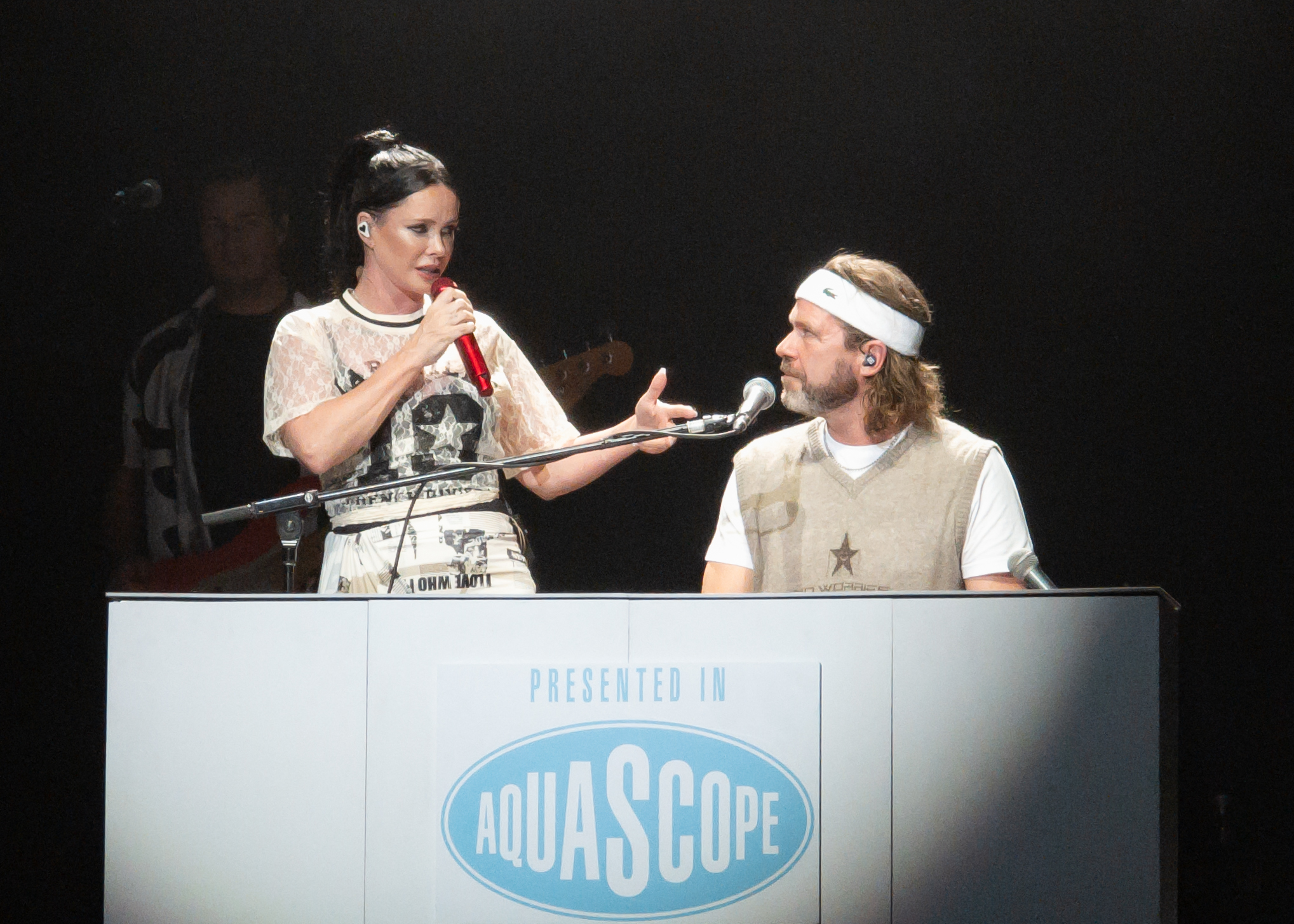
Nystrøm with her ex-husband Søren Rasted, 2025

Nystrøm was in a relationship for three years with fellow Aqua band member René Dif, who originally invited her to join the band in 1994.

On 25 August 2001, Nystrøm married fellow Aqua band member Søren Rasted, with the ceremony being held in Las Vegas. In 2004, the couple relocated to Denmark from London. They have a daughter and a son. The couple divorced on 27 April 2017 after nearly 16 years of marriage.

== Discography ==
=== Studio albums ===
Year	Album details	Peak chart positions		Certifications
Year	Album details	DEN	NOR	Certifications
2003	Play with Me: Released: 21 September 2003; Label: Polydor; Formats: CD	30	74	
"—" denotes albums that did not chart or were not released.

== Singles ==
=== As lead artist ===
Year	Title	Peak chart positions		Album
Year	Title	DEN	NOR	Album
2003	"It's Your Duty"	3	9	Play With Me
2004	"Pretty Young Thing"	–	—	Play With Me
"—" denotes singles that did not chart or were not released.

=== As featured artist ===
Year	Title	Peak chart positions				Album
Year	Title	DEN	NOR	SWE	GER	Album
2005	"Hvor små vi er" (as part of Giv Til Asien)	1	—	—	—	—N/a
2008	"Vi ka alt vi to" (Hej Matematik featuring Lene)	–	—	—	—	Vi Burde Ses Noget Mere
2012	"2012 (Shift happens)" (LazyB featuring Lene)	–	—	—	—	—N/a
"—" denotes singles that did not chart or were not released.

=== Promotional singles ===
Year	Title	Peak chart positions				Album
Year	Title	DEN	NOR	SWE	GER	Album
2004	"Here We Go"	–	—	—	—	Play With Me
2004	"Scream"	–	—	—	—	Play With Me
"—" denotes promotional singles that did not chart or were not released.

== Other appearances ==
Title	Year	Other artist(s)	Album
"Two Directions"	1992	—N/a	Something Special: Melodier av Tom Hansen
"I Love N.Y."	2005	LazyB	Lazyboy TV

== Filmography ==
=== Films ===
Film	Year	Director	Character	Description
Fri os fra det onde	2009	Ole Bornedal	Pernille	Film debut. Internationally released as "Deliver us from evil".
Svik	2009	Håkon Gundersen	Eva Karlsen	Internationally released as "Betrayal" includes three exclusive recorded songs in German, called "Wenn der Krieg gewonnen ist", "Die französische Sängerin" and "Tigerin und Vögellein", which are yet unreleased.
G-Force	2009	Hoyt Yeatman	Juarez	Nystrøm's first voice role, where she dubbed Penélope Cruz as the female guinea pig, FBI Special Agent, in Norwegian. Alternative title "Spy Animal: G-Force".
Varg Veum – Skriften på veggen	2010	Stefan Faldbakken	Karin Bjørge	First movie of the second series. Nystrøm plays the girlfriend of Trond Espen Seim's character Varg Veum. Internationally broadcast as "The Wolve – The writing on the wall". German title is "Der Wolf – Das Geschriebene an der Wand".
Varg Veum – Svarte får	2011	Stefan Faldbakken	Karin Bjørge	Second movie of the second series. Internationally broadcast as "The Wolve – Black sheep".
Varg Veum – Dødens drabanter	2011	Stephan Apelgren	Karin Bjørge	Third movie of the second series. Internationally broadcast as "The Wolve – Consorts of death".
Klassefesten	2011	Niels Nørløv Hansen	Eva	Supporting role.
Varg Veum – I mørket er alle ulver grå	2011	Stephan Apelgren	Karin Bjørge	Fourth movie of the second series. Internationally broadcast as "The Wolve – At night all wolves are grey".
Varg Veum – De døde har det godt	2012	Stephan Apelgren	Karin Bjørge	Fifth movie of the second series. Internationally broadcast as "The Wolve – The dead has it easy".
Varg Veum – Kalde hjerter	2012	Stephan Apelgren	Karin Bjørge	Sixth and final movie of the second series. Internationally broadcast as "The Wolve – Cold hearts"

=== Series ===
Television show	Year	Character	Description
Lulu & Leon	2009	Alexandra von Linden	Subtitled "Bankrøverens Kone". Season 1, Episodes 3-5 ("Hvad der ligger i kortene", "Naboens kone" and "Faldne kvinder").

=== Music videos ===
Year	Title	Artist	Director(s)	Notes
2003	"It's Your Duty"	Lene	Harvey & Carolyn for Alchemy Films	In her solo debut video, Nystrøm plays a sexy seducer in four different dominant roles: a massagist, an executive woman, a dancer and a dominatrix.
2004	"Pretty Young Thing"	Lene	Harvey & Carolyn for Alchemy Films	Nystrøm changes her clothes and poses in a photo session for magazine articles and covers.
2005	"Hvor små vi er"	Giv Til Asien	Poul Krebs & Remee	A charity single performed by Danish artists (singers, actors and musicians) under the name Giv Til Asien (translated as Give to Asia). A small number of artists from other European countries also joined in. The single with lyrics by Remee and music by Nicolai Seebach and Rasmus Seebach, was released in aid of various charities for tsunami relief as a result the 2004 Indian Ocean earthquake.
2005	"I Love N.Y."	LazyB feat. Lene	Søren Rasted for Ding Dong Productions	The LazyB video features street interviews and footage in New York City, and can be found on the Danish Limited Edition of the Lazyboy TV DVD. Lene doesn't appear in the music video.
2008	"Walkmand"	Hej Matematik	Various	The video footage is from Hej Matematik's 2008 tour. It features a cameo appearance of Nystrøm.
2012	"2012 (Shift happens)"	LazyB feat. Lene	Alan Smithee	Lene doesn't appear in the music video but provides vocals for this video.
2014	"Ik Ordinær"	Hej Matematik feat. Jesper Binzer	Søren Rasted for Ding Dong Productions	Self produced music video from Hej Matematik featuring Jesper Binzer, lead singer from the Danish band "D.A.D.". Nystrøm makes a cameo appearance.

=== Commercials ===
Company/product	Year	Director	Description
Synsam	2011	—N/a	

=== TV appearances ===
- 2000: "Danish Grammy Awards 2000"
- 2000: "Harald Schmidt Show" – "Show No. 791 – Harald Und Die Windsors"
- 2003: "Boogie Århus Lisen" – 13 September 2003
- 2003: "Stjerne for en aften – Vinderen" – Episode 1.2
- 2003: "Først & sist med Fredrik Skavland" – Episode 10.2
- 2003: "Senkveld med Thomas og Harald" – 3 October 2003
- 2003: "Junior Eurovision Song Contest 2003"
- 2003: "God kveld Norge" – 27 September 2003
- 2003: "God kveld Norge" – 22 November 2003
- 2005: "Hele Historien"
- 2005: "Nordic Music Awards 2005 – Countdown" – (Host)
- 2006: "Go' aften Danmark" – 10 December 2006
- 2007: "Miss Africa Danmark 2007" – (Opening Speech)
- 2007: "DR1's Grand Danois Awards 2007"
- 2008: "Reimers" – Episode 1.3 – 10 October 2008
- 2008: "21st European Film Awards 2008"
- 2009: "Bornedal og det onde – bag kameraet"
- 2010: "Det nye talkshow" – 12 November 2010
- 2010: "Litt av et liv" – 17 November 2010
- 2011: "Skavlan" – 28 January 2011
- 2011: "Familien fra Bryggen" – Episode 1.1
- 2012: "Voice – Danmarks største stemme" – 8 Episodes
- 2013: "The Voice – Norges største stemme"
- 2015: "Hver gang vi møtes" – 8 Episodes
