= Claus Norreen =

Danish musician

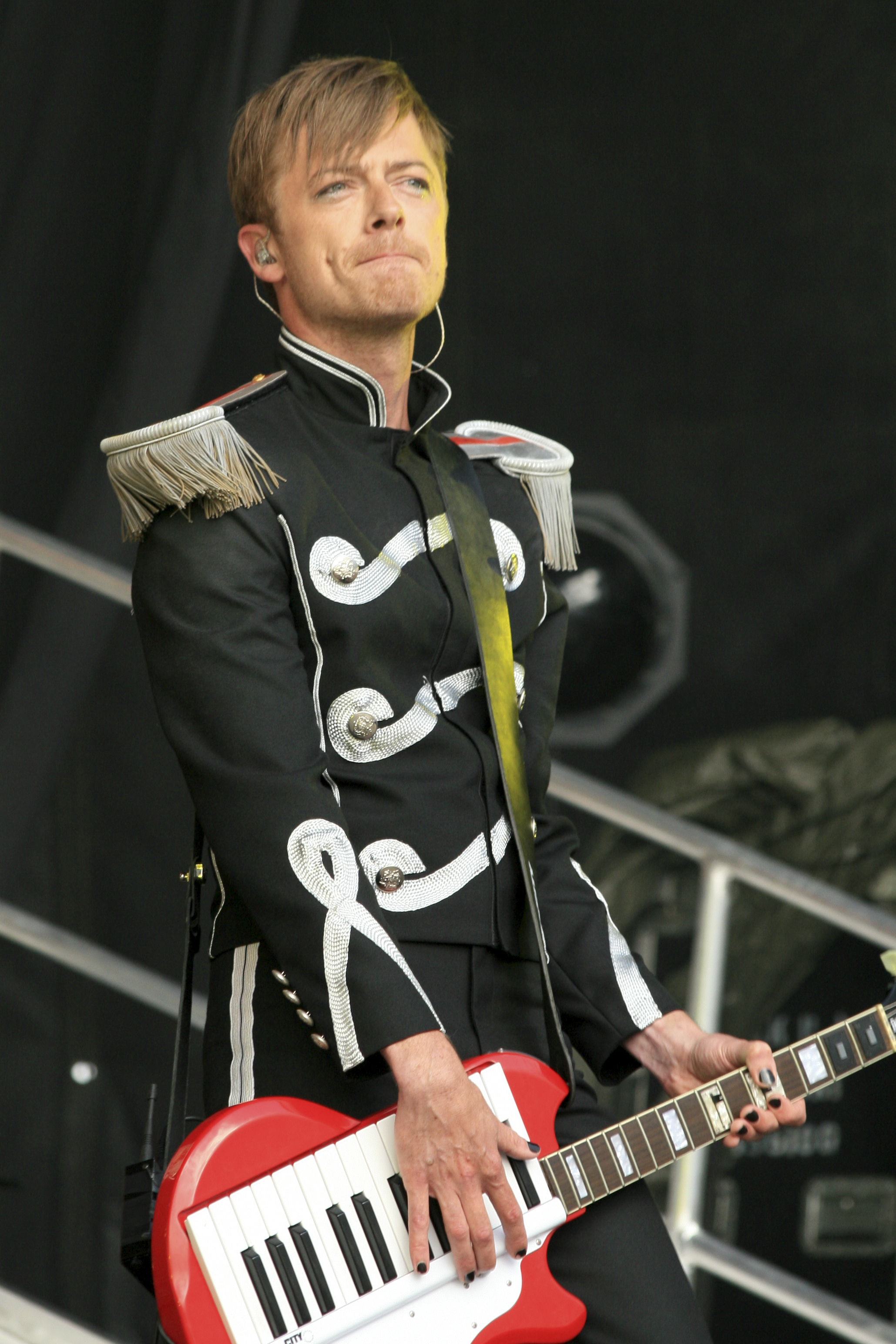
- Norreen in 2008

Background information
- Born: 5 June 1970 (age 55); Charlottenlund, Denmark
- Genres: Electropop, industrial techno, pop, europop, eurodance, dance-pop
- Occupations: Musician, songwriter, record producer
- Instruments: Guitar, keyboards
- Years active: 1988–2016
- Formerly of: Aqua

Claus Norreen (born 5 June 1970) is a Danish musician known for being a part of the pop band Aqua, which sold around 33 million records. He left the band in September 2016 to take on other musical ventures.

== Biography ==
Norreen was born in Charlottenlund, near Copenhagen. One of his biggest interests was electropop music. Hence, he bought a keyboard and started playing industrial techno.

When he finished school he started to work in his sisters' clothing store. The work in the store inspired him and influenced his style of music. In 1989, he met Søren Rasted and moved his music instrument to his residence.

Claus married Danish journalist Siggy Norreen (née Madsen) in 2001. Their son Elliott was born in February 2003. The couple have since separated.

== Discography ==
=== Aqua albums ===
- Aquarium (1997)
- Aquarius (2000)
- Megalomania (2011)

=== Albums ===
- Frække Frida Og De Frygtløse Spioner (1994, various artists)

=== Singles ===
- "Submerged" (1992) (Aeroflot)
- "Itzy Bitzy Spider" (1995) (Joyspeed)

=== Remixes ===
- "In my mind" (Danny Red Remix) (1998) (Antiloop)
- "Living in your head" (Aeroflot Remix) (2000) (Soundlovers)
- "Forever" (Aeroflot & Feindflug Remix) (2003) (Bruderschaft)
- "Facts of life" (Danny Red Remix) (2004) (LazyB)

=== Remix versions ===
- Aeroflot – "Submerge" (4:18)
- Antiloop – "In my mind" (Danny Red Remix) (3:27)
- Bruderschaft – "Forever" (Aeroflot & Feindflug Remix) (5:55)
- LazyB – "Facts of life" (Danny Red Mix Edit) (3:20)
- LazyB – "Facts of life" (Danny Red Remix) (5:29)
- LazyB – "Facts of life" (Danny Red vs. Claus Noreen Mix) (4:01)
- Soundlovers – "Living in your head" (Aeroflot Mix) (5:00)
- Soundlovers – "Living in your head" (Aeroflot Radio) (3:19)
- Soundlovers – "Living in your head" (Aeroflot Remix) (4:50)
