= Søren Rasted =

Danish musician (born 1969)

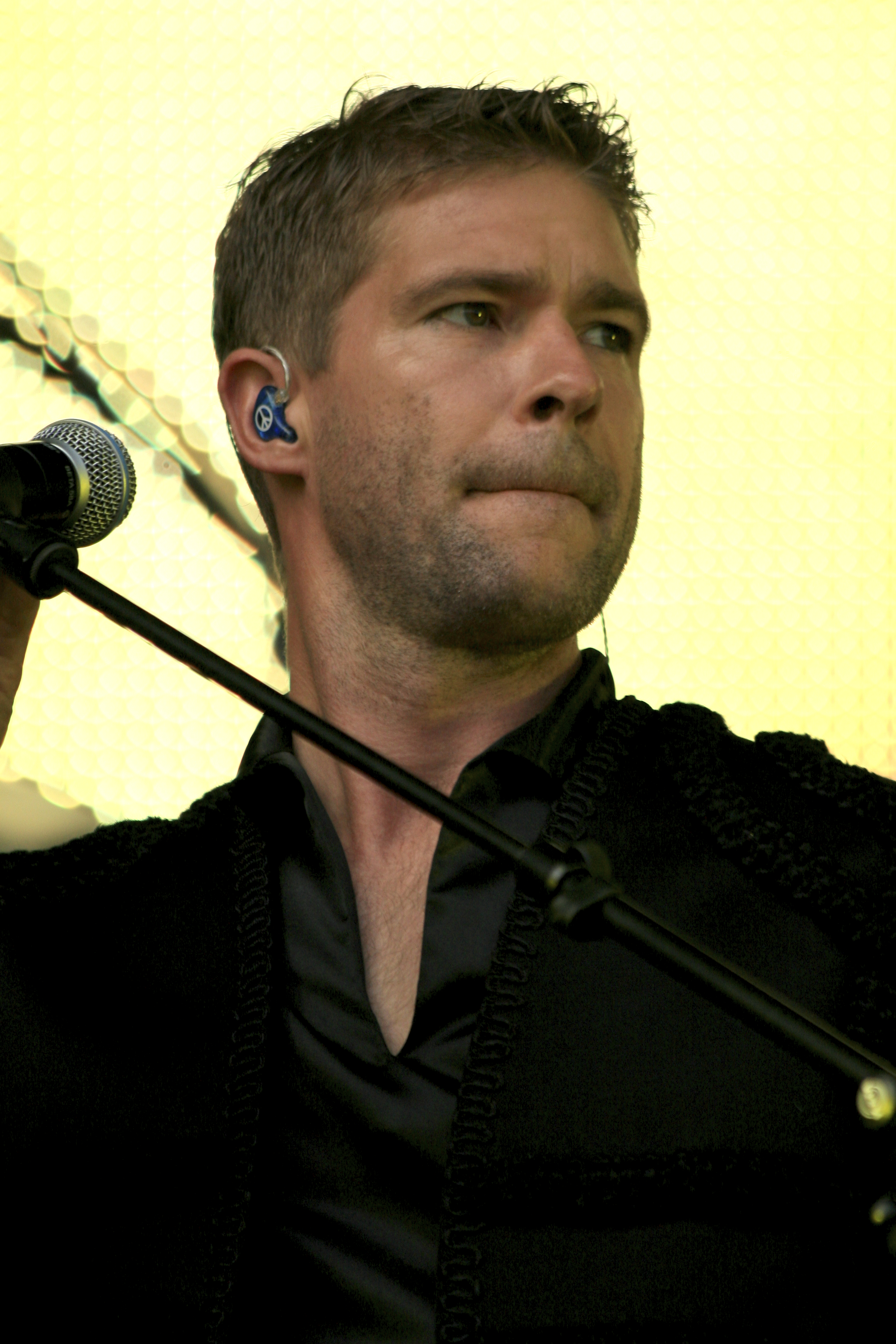
- Rasted in 2008

Background information
- Also known as: Lazyboy
- Born: 13 June 1969 (age 57); Blovstrød, Denmark
- Genres: Pop, dance-pop, Eurodance, Europop, spoken word, comedy
- Occupations: Musician, singer, songwriter, record producer
- Instruments: Keyboards, guitar, drums, vocals
- Years active: 1987–present
- Label: Universal
- Member of: Hej Matematik
- Formerly of: Aqua

Søren Nystrøm Rasted (born Søren Rasted; 13 June 1969) is a Danish musician, singer, songwriter and record producer. He plays keyboards, guitar and sings backing vocals. He was a member of the Danish-Norwegian Eurodance group Aqua.

== Musical career ==
Rasted was a member of the Danish pop-dance group Aqua. He and his fellow band member Claus wrote and produced the three Aqua albums Aquarium, Aquarius and Megalomania. Aqua was formed in 1994 and split up in 2001, but reunited in 2008. The band sold more than 28 million records worldwide, and appeared in the Guinness Book of Records as the only debut band with three "self penned" Number One hits in the UK.

In 2004 Rasted released the spoken word album Lazyboy TV under the name Lazyboy. The album included the singles "Facts of Life", "Inhale Positivity" and "Underwear Goes Inside the Pants".

Rasted has worked as producer and songwriters on various Danish artists such as Sort Sol writing their "Holler High". Rasted also worked with Jon on "Right Here Next to You" and "This Side Up". He also wrote the single "Teardrops in Heaven" for Sanne Salomonsen, The single "Det bedste til sidst" for X-Factor winner Linda, and the single for Mathias Pachler "Mit Et & Alt".

In 2006 Rasted wrote and arranged music for "Det Kgl Teater", the music for the Royal Danish Opera ballet American Mixtures.

Rasted is a member of the Danish band Hej Matematik.

He has also made various TV scores and film scores, including - in collaboration with Nicolaj Rasted - score music for the Jonatan Spang movie "Talenttyven" (2012).

In 2009, Aqua released their second greatest hits album, for which Rasted produced three new songs: "Back to the 80's", "Live Fast - Die Young" and "My Mamma Said". In 2011, Aqua released their third album Megalomania.

In 2012, Rasted started the Label LabelLand, distributed by ArtPeople, and released "2012 Shift Happens", the first Lazyboy track in seven years.

== Personal life ==
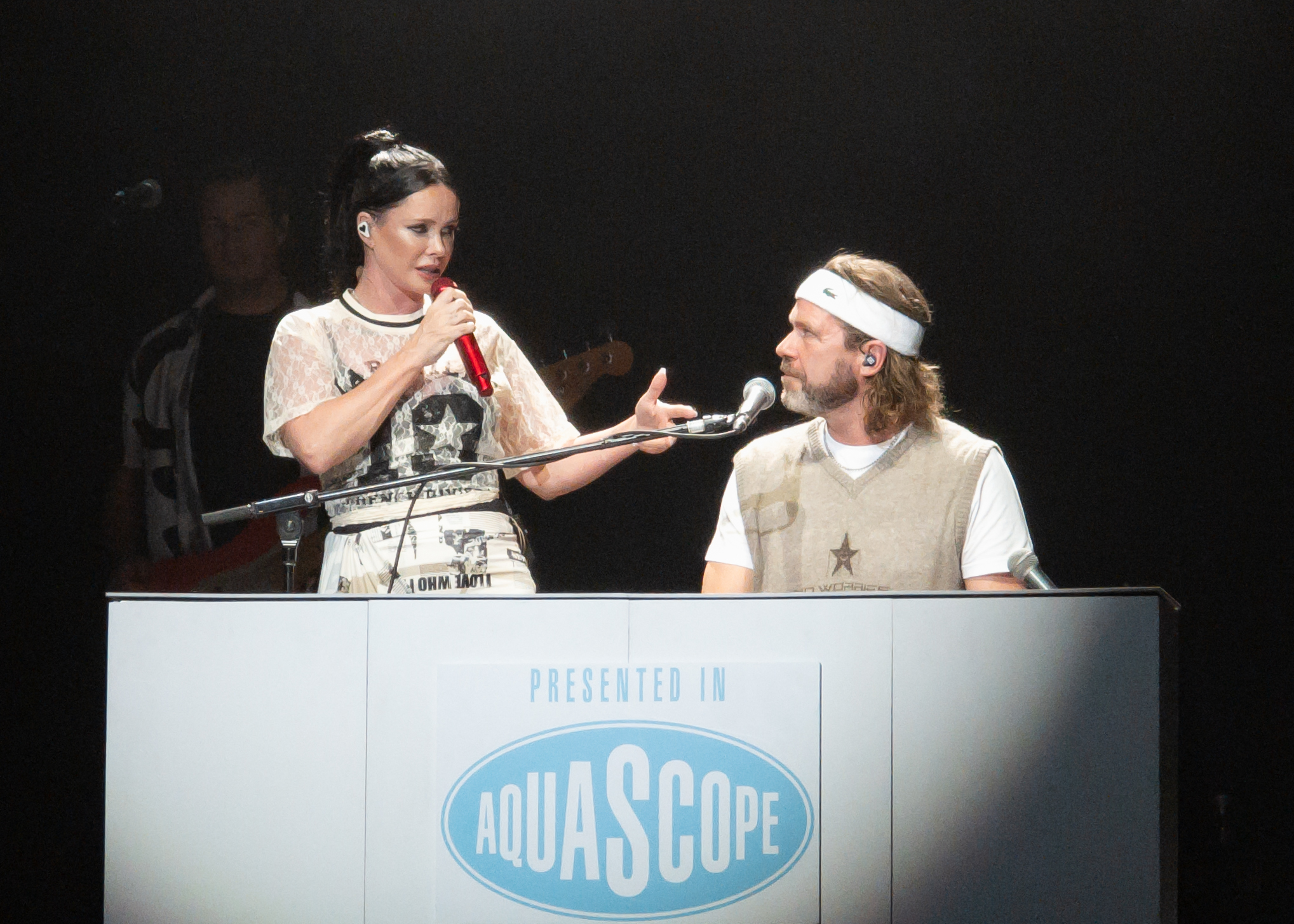
Rasted with his ex-wife Lene Nystrøm, 2025

On 25 August 2001, Rasted married fellow Aqua band member Lene Nystrøm, with the ceremony being held in Las Vegas. In 2004 the couple moved to Denmark from London. Together, they have a daughter, India, and a son, Billy. The couple divorced on 27 April 2017 after sixteen years of marriage.

== Discography ==
with Aqua

1996 Roses are red
1997 My Oh My
1997 Aquarium – (ALBUM)
1997 Barbie Girl
1997 Dr. Jones
1997 Goodmorning Sunshine
1997 Lollipop/Candyman U.S. Version
1998 Turn Back Time
1998 Diddnt I (The B Sides)
1998 Aquarium – The Remixes – (ALBUM)
2000 Cartoon Heroes
2000 Aquarius – (ALBUM)
2000 Around the world
2000 Bumble bees
2000 We belong to the sea
2000 Freaky Friday – For the U.S. Motion Picture
2000 Halloween
2009 Back to the 80s
2009 My Mamma Said
2009 Aqua – Best of – (ALBUM)
2011 How R U Doin'?
2011 Playmate To Jesus
2011 Megalomania - (ALBUM)

For Jon

2002 Right here next to you
2002 This side up
2002 Endlessly

For Sort Sol

2003 Holler High
2003 Golden Wonder

For Sanne Salomonsen

2003 Teardrops in heaven

For Lene

2003 Scream

For Linda

2009 Bedste til sidst (X-Factor winner-song)

with Lazyboy

2004 Facts of life
2004 Underwear goes inside the pants
2004 LazyboyTV (ALBUM)
2004 Inhale Positivity
2004 It's all about love
2012 2012 – Shift Happens

with Hej Matematik

2007 Gymnastik
2007 Centerpubben
2008 Du og Jeg
2008 Walkmand
2008 Vi Burde Ses Noget Mere (ALBUM)
2009 Party I Provinsen
2010 Alt Går Op I 6 (ALBUM)
2010 Legendebørn
2010 Kato på maskinerne
2011 The Loser Sign
2012 Livet i Plastik
2012 Det blir en go dag. Feat. Ankerstjerne
2012 Sikke en fest

for Mathias Pachler

2012 Mit Et & Alt

Score songs for the soundtrack to the motion picture Talenttyven

2012 Ovre mig
2012 Jo-Ann
