= Skanks for the Memories... (album) =

Studio album by Dave Attell
- Released: February 4, 2003
- Recorded: November 2002
- Venue: Comedy Works
- Genre: Stand-up comedy
- Length: 54:30
- Label: Comedy Central Records

Dave Attell chronology
The Best of Insomniac Uncensored (Vol. 2) (2003)	Skanks for the Memories... (2003)	Dave Attell: Hey, Your Mouth's Not Pregnant! (2005)

Skanks for the Memories... is a comedy album by Dave Attell released in 2003 on Comedy Central Records. It was recorded live in November 2002 at Comedy Works in Denver, Colorado.

The album reached #24 on Billboard's Independent Albums Chart and #36 on the Heatseekers Chart.

== Critical reception ==
WTOP News wrote "I guess you could say that his travel-show stardom is ironic because his seminal comedy album “Skanks for the Memories” (2003) saw him admit, “I hate traveling, mostly because my dad used to beat me with a globe.”"

Professional ratings
Review scores
Source	Rating
AllMusic	4.5/5 stars

== Track listing ==
1. "Odd Look"
2. "Drinking Tips"
3. "Fun Happens Late"
4. "Travel"
5. "Flying"
6. "Bus Station"
7. "The Unfuckables"
8. "Tattoos"
9. "Smoking"
10. "Lonely Bug"
11. "I Miss My Dad"
12. "Fireworks"
13. "Homophobic"
14. "Midget Friend"
15. "Parrot"
16. "Condoms"
17. "Love"
18. "Gambling"
19. "Shaved Pubes"
20. "Religion"
21. "Drugs"
22. "Breast Feeding"
23. "Sex with Animals"
24. "Amish Sex"
25. "Dick Jokes"
26. "Sex Store"
27. "Masturbation"
28. "Find the Smell"
