= Stand-up special =

Film and TV genre

A stand-up special is a film and television genre featuring a live performance by a stand-up comedian that has been recorded for later broadcast or exhibition. In the United States, stand-up series and specials were aired on cable TV channels like HBO in the 1970s, and Showtime, VH1 and Comedy Central in the 1980s and 1990s. They have become increasingly popular and cost-effective content for streaming services like Hulu and Netflix.

Standup specials may "interweave additional filmic material such as sketches (Sarah Silverman's Jesus is Magic), interviews (Gary Gulman's The Great Depresh) or surrealistic cut-aways (Chelsea Peretti's One of the Greats)." Stand-up specials can feature multiple comedians. Subject matter within even one comedian's specials may range from political commentary (John Mulaney's "there's a horse loose in the hospital" bit) to self-conscious confessional (John Mulaney's "and this is the story I'm willing to tell you..." recounting of his drug addictions and stint in recovery).

By contrast, "documentaries about comedians and comedy (Joan Rivers: A Piece of Work, Why We Laugh: Black Comedians on Black Comedy) don't become specials by virtue of their presentation of actual stand-up set."

In ideal scenarios for the comedian, bits from the set can go viral on social media and elevate the comedian to a new level of public recognition, such as was the case with Sindhu Vee's segment from the BBC's Live at the Apollo series. As a rule, live-show comedy-club stand-up is not a particularly lucrative or reliable income stream for the traveling bards.

== See also ==
- Concert film
- Marty Callner
- Eddie Murphy Raw – 1987 stand-up special directed by Robert Townsend
- Comedians in Cars Getting Coffee
- Stand-Up Spotlight
- Netflix Is a Joke Festival
- Edinburgh Comedy Awards
