= Greg Giraldo =

American comedian (1965–2010)

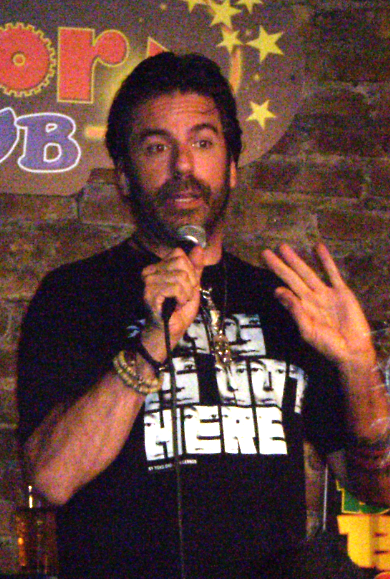
- Greg Giraldo's final performance, September 24, 2010, in New Brunswick, New Jersey
- Born: Gregory Carlos Giraldo; December 10, 1965; Queens, New York, U.S.
- Died: September 29, 2010 (aged 44); New Brunswick, New Jersey, U.S.
- Resting place: Good Ground Cemetery, Hampton Bays, New York
- Education: Columbia University (BA); Harvard University (JD)
- Notable work: Tough Crowd with Colin Quinn; Stand-Up Nation; Comedy Central Roasts; Lewis Black's Root of All Evil
- Spouse: Maryann McAlpin-Giraldo (m. 1999)
- Children: 3

Comedy career
- Years active: 1992–2010
- Medium: Stand-up; television
- Genres: Observational comedy; black comedy; surreal humor; insult comedy
- Subjects: Current events; everyday life; self-deprecation; marriage; parenting; pop culture

Gregory Carlos Giraldo (December 10, 1965 – September 29, 2010) was an American stand-up comedian, television personality, and lawyer. He is remembered for his appearances on Comedy Central's televised roast specials, and for his work on that network's television shows Tough Crowd with Colin Quinn, Lewis Black's Root of All Evil, and the programming block Stand-Up Nation, the last of which he hosted.

== Early life and education ==
Giraldo was born and raised in Bayside, Queens. His father, Alfonso, was from Colombia and worked for Pan Am, and his mother, Dolores, was from Spain. Giraldo was raised Roman Catholic and spoke fluent Spanish. He was the oldest of three children (brother John and sister Elizabeth). Giraldo played the guitar in a band in his late teens/early twenties.

Giraldo was an excellent student and received an academic scholarship to the private Jesuit Regis High School in Manhattan. After graduating from Regis in 1983, he earned a bachelor's degree in English from Columbia University in 1987. While at Columbia, he was an active member of the Psi Upsilon fraternity.

Giraldo was admitted to Harvard Law School after achieving a near perfect score on his Law School Admission Test (LSAT), scoring in the 99th percentile of students taking the test. He earned a J.D. degree from Harvard Law School in 1990.

== Legal career ==
Giraldo passed the bar and began a career as a lawyer, working for eight months as an associate for Skadden, Arps, Slate, Meagher & Flom before changing his occupation.

In 1993, Giraldo provided pro bono defense counsel services to his friend and fellow comedian Jeffrey Ross, who was charged with inciting a riot. Ross was performing at a comedy club on Long Island when a member of the audience pulled out a toy gun that looked real. Ross grabbed the gun and fought with the man for control; he was arrested in the incident.

When Ross went to court to face the charges, "Greg volunteered to be my attorney as a favor. I remember we slept in his parents' basement in Queens. We drove to court in a Jeep and had dirty blue sport jackets on. It took him two tries, but he got the case dismissed."

Giraldo said that, at the time of the case, he had never litigated in a courtroom before. When the case was upgraded to a weapons charge, he had nearly told Ross to plead guilty, which would have resulted in his friend serving jail time. "The judge called us over... and I had to plead, 'I have no idea what I'm doing here.' We ended up having to get a real lawyer and come back a month later," said Giraldo.

Giraldo found that, although he did well in law school, he did not like the practice of corporate law.

His family was disappointed that Giraldo left law practice, but he said:

I always wanted to do something creative. I've always had real trouble knowing what my actual desires and goals are. I've just been dragged along by fate. I can't even tell you why I thought to go to law school.

Because I went to Harvard Law School it seemed like I had my shit together, but I did only because it’s not hard. Everyone is so self-motivated that they leave you alone. You get study outlines and just cram, but then when you get out into the real world, it gets tricky. Most comedians are people who couldn’t really work in the real world, they’re too disorganized, too lazy, too fucked up, too erratic, too unstable. If you could work in the real world you would have stayed there because it is so many years of misery in comedy before you really start popping.

In August 2000, Giraldo was featured in an Esquire magazine article that profiled several members of the Harvard Law School class of 1990 who ended up choosing career paths other than law. After turning to comedy, Giraldo rarely discussed his prior career; the Esquire article was one of the few times that he referred to his time as a lawyer.

== Career ==
Giraldo started doing stand-up comedy in 1992. When asked who his comedic influences were, Giraldo stated: "For me, I wasn't really influenced by the good people. I was influenced by the (crappy) people. I would watch 'Evening at the Improv' and those kind of shows, and I'd think, 'Man, those guys blow so bad. I can do that.' And I went from there."

Giraldo performed regularly at the Comedy Cellar comedy club in Manhattan, as well as clubs all over the U.S. Additionally, he was the star of the short-lived sitcom Common Law. Giraldo landed the sitcom after being spotted by Hollywood agents at the 1995 Just for Laughs festival in Montreal. From 2002 to 2004, he was a regular panelist on Tough Crowd with Colin Quinn. Giraldo also starred in several pilots, including Drive for CBS and The Greg Giraldo Show, Adult Content and Gone Hollywood for Comedy Central. In 2004, he was featured in the spoken-word Lazyboy song "Underwear Goes Inside the Pants".

Giraldo performed more than a dozen times on Late Night with Conan O'Brien, Late Show with David Letterman, and Jimmy Kimmel Live! and appeared regularly on The Howard Stern Show. He also appeared as a member of the panel in the NBC show The Marriage Ref.

Giraldo acted in two Adam Dubin features, 2002's comedic short American Dummy, in which he played a psychiatrist, and 2008's animated film, What Blows Up Must Come Down!, in which he did the voice of Jihad Jo. He also did the voice of President Theodore Roosevelt in the audiobook version of Sarah Vowell's 2005 book Assassination Vacation.

He appeared on The Late Late Show with Craig Kilborn, Politically Incorrect, The View, Fox News Channel's The Full Nelson and Beyond the News, Louie Anderson's Comedy Showcase, Comedy Central's Comic Cabana, Showtime's Latino Comedy Festival and Funny is Funny, as well as on the BBC's Live at Jongleurs. Giraldo also performed at the United States Naval Base in Guantanamo Bay, Cuba, as part of a USO tour in 2002.

He had two half-hour specials on Comedy Central Presents, wrote segments for Last Call with Carson Daly, and was a panelist on Comedy Central's 100 Greatest Stand-ups of All Time special. In 2004, his stand-up material was featured in Comedy Central's animated series Shorties Watchin' Shorties. He appeared in both English and Spanish-language commercials for "1-800-OK-Cable". Giraldo also appeared on the IFC show, Z Rock, playing an angry record producer.

Giraldo said on Late Night with Conan O'Brien on July 7, 2005, that he had quit drinking alcohol. His series Friday Night Stand-Up with Greg Giraldo began on Comedy Central in late 2005 and ran until 2006. His album Good Day to Cross a River was released in 2006 by Comedy Central Records. Giraldo was featured (along with Dane Cook and Sean Rouse) in Dave Attell's Insomniac Tour, released April 2006. This 98-minute film is thought by many of his fans to be one of his best performances—showing him on stage at work and also behind the scenes, with a glimpse of life on the road as a comedian.

Giraldo appeared in several Comedy Central's annual roasts, roasting Chevy Chase, Pamela Anderson, William Shatner, Jeff Foxworthy, Flavor Flav, Bob Saget, Joan Rivers, Larry the Cable Guy, and David Hasselhoff, as well as the TBS roast of Cheech & Chong.

He was a regular guest on Comedy Central's television series Lewis Black's Root of All Evil and was one of the advocates lobbying for his side to be considered the "root of all evil." He won Black's decision in two of his nine appearances, but won the audience poll six times. Giraldo served as a judge during season seven of the NBC reality competition show Last Comic Standing.

In 2008, Giraldo appeared in venues across the United States as the headlining act of the Indecision '08 Tour, produced by Comedy Central. Midlife Vices, his only one-hour special for Comedy Central, was released in 2009. In June 2010, Giraldo performed at the Bonnaroo Music and Arts Festival in Tennessee. That same month, he hosted The Nasty Show in Chicago, and in July, The Nasty Show in Montreal.

== Personal life ==
Giraldo was married twice. He married first at age 23, and the couple divorced after two years.

He married his second wife, Maryann, on January 23, 1999. She was a former waitress at Caroline's comedy club. Together they had three sons. Giraldo had the tattoo "Maryann 1-23-99" on his right biceps. Giraldo and Maryann separated in 2008 and had many reconciliations before his death. Although they were in the process of divorce when he died, it was never finalized.

Giraldo had a tribal design tattoo on his left forearm that contained the number 525. He was reluctant to discuss its meaning. Comedian Jim Norton of Opie and Anthony later said that it represented his sobriety struggle; May 25 was the day that he first sobered up. Giraldo had been to rehab for alcohol and other drug abuse several times. He said that once he had been so intoxicated that he punched something and broke four bones in his hand while performing at Gotham Comedy Club. Through the early 2000s, Giraldo was candid about his struggles with drug and alcohol addiction, and the challenges of life on the road, often incorporating these themes into his act. In 2009 he said that he had freed himself from addiction.

== Death ==
Giraldo was scheduled to perform as a part of a four night engagement at The Stress Factory on Saturday September 25, 2010. He was also scheduled to appear at a concert at the 3rd Annual New York Recovery Rally, introducing singer Courtney Love. The event, held on Randalls Island in New York City, was "to celebrate the reality of recovery from addiction and offer hope to those who have yet to find recovery". The concert was held between noon and 3 p.m., but Giraldo never showed up. Instead paramedics found him unconscious in a Hyatt Regency Hotel in New Brunswick, New Jersey.

Giraldo was taken to nearby Robert Wood Johnson University Hospital, where he remained in a coma on life support. His family decided to take him off life support, and he died on September 29, 2010, at the age of 44. His death was ruled a prescription drug overdose.Giraldo was buried at Good Ground Cemetery in Hampton Bays, New York, with the inscription "Beloved Father / Always Loved / Forever Remembered".

== Tributes ==
On September 29, 2010, on The Daily Show with Jon Stewart, Jon Stewart honored Giraldo during the end-of-show "Your Moment of Zen" segment by playing a clip of his stand-up and renaming the segment for that night "Your Moment of Greg". John Popper, lead singer of Blues Traveler, dedicated the song "The Mountains Win Again" to Giraldo during the band's concert on September 29; he had worked with the comedian on the TV show Z Rock. On September 30, 2010, numerous comedians and celebrities expressed their sorrow over Giraldo's death on Twitter. Comedy Central posted a series of clips from Giraldo's past works, titled "The Best of Greg Giraldo," on their website.

On October 9, 2010, Comedy Central aired a special titled Comics Anonymous: Addictive Stand-Up. Filmed prior to Giraldo's death, it featured several comedians who had been sober for 10 years or more. The show's executive producer, comedian Mike DeStefano, dedicated the special to Giraldo. On October 12, 2010, the series premiere of Nick Swardson's Pretend Time, Swardson dedicated the episode to Giraldo.

On November 2, 2010, Comix comedy club in New York hosted the Jim Florentine roast, at which Giraldo had been scheduled to perform. Throughout the show, many of the comedians paid tribute to Giraldo, roast-style. Host Rich Vos joked: "I wasn't the first choice to host. Greg Giraldo was asked, but he said he'd rather be dead than host this."

On February 9, 2011, a benefit titled "The Big Time Comedy Show" was held at NYC's Beacon Theatre. It was to raise money for Giraldo's sons and for The Greg Giraldo Fund, founded in his memory. Maryann Giraldo said it was "to help children living within families of addiction... to be educated, encouraged and empowered, and given the tools they need to make different choices in their lives". The lineup included sets by Jerry Seinfeld, Lewis Black, Colin Quinn, Dave Attell, Jim Norton, Ted Alexandro, Nick DiPaolo, Jesse Joyce, and Eddie Brill, and the event was hosted by Tom Papa. Another benefit show was held in Los Angeles at the Wiltern Theater on June 29, 2011, and featured sets by Jeffrey Ross, Daniel Tosh, Marc Maron, Ralphie May, Brian Posehn, Bill Burr, Dave Attell, and Tom Papa; it was hosted by Jesse Joyce.

The Columbia University Alumni Association staged two benefit shows on March 28, 2011, at the Gotham Comedy Club in NYC. The comedians who performed sets were Todd Barry, Amy Schumer, John Mulaney, Joe Mande, Morgan Murphy, Godfrey, Rachel Feinstein, Michael Ian Black, and Robert Kelly, and the shows were hosted by Gabe Liedman and Stress Factory owner Vinnie Brand.

Seth MacFarlane, Anthony Jeselnik, and Jeffrey Ross paid tribute to Giraldo during the Comedy Central Roast of Donald Trump in March 2011, and dedicated the program to him.

On March 18, 2011, Comedy Central aired Give It Up for Greg Giraldo, a two-hour television special honoring his memory in which multiple comedians, including Jon Stewart, Nick Swardson, Colin Quinn, Jeffrey Ross, Denis Leary, Sarah Silverman, Dave Attell, Tom Papa, Lewis Black, Bill Burr, Daniel Tosh, Chelsea Peretti, Conan O'Brien, Jesse Joyce and Whitney Cummings, talked about his life and career. It also contained short clips of his roasts and other acts.

Greg Fitzsimmons dedicated his 2010 book Dear Mrs. Fitzsimmons: Tales of Redemption from an Irish Mailbox, to Giraldo and several other comedians. Holly George-Warren's 2012 book Bonnaroo: What, Which, This, That, The Other was also dedicated to Giraldo.

Social worker Joe Schrank, a friend of Giraldo's, has a tattoo that says "Best Wishes, God," a phrase that Giraldo often wrote into hotel room Bibles.

A biography by Matt Balaker and Wayne Jones, Greg Giraldo: A Comedian's Story, was published in March 2019. It features interviews with family, friends, fans, and colleagues.

Vice dedicated an episode of its 2022 series Dark Side of Comedy to Giraldo, including interviews with his sons Lucas, Daniel, and Greg Jr.; friends and fellow comics Felipe Esparza, Jim Gaffigan, Tom Papa and Ritch Shydner; talent manager Rick Dorfman; author Matt Balaker; addiction counselor Joe Shrank; and writing partner Jesse Joyce, another former addict. Giraldo was universally praised as a brilliant man—his blessing and his curse, said Papa—who took to substance abuse to "quiet the mind chatter." When Giraldo compared his career to that of Larry the Cable Guy and asked for advice on sobriety, Shydner said, "you've got to have acceptance ... you can't outsmart addiction." Shrank recalled walking in on some of the worst scenes of self-hatred. Lisa Lampanelli once tried to hide from Giraldo after he said some "mean shit" during one of her roast appearances but, when they saw each other, he kissed her cheek and said, "'great fuckin' job!' ... [and I was] crying because, like, that's the real fuckin' Greg."

== Filmography ==
=== Television ===
Year(s)	Title	Role	Notes
1996	Common Law	John Alvarez	10 episodes produced (only 4 aired)
1997	Live At Jongleurs	Himself	Stand-up
1997	Later	Himself	Guest host
2000–2004	Comedy Central Presents	Himself	Stand-up (2 appearances)
2000–2008	Late Night with Conan O'Brien	Himself	Stand-up (5 appearances)
2001	Late Friday	Himself	
2002	Comedy Central Presents: The N.Y. Friars Club Roast of Chevy Chase	Himself	Roaster
2002	The Greg Giraldo Show	Greg	NBC pilot
2002	The Colin Quinn Show	Himself/Various	
2002–2004	The View	Himself	(2 appearances)
2002–2004	Last Call with Carson Daly	Himself	Stand-up/Writer
2002–2004	Tough Crowd with Colin Quinn	Himself/Various	Writer
2003–2005	Late Show with David Letterman	Himself	Stand-up (2 appearances)
2004	Comedy Central Presents: 100 Greatest Stand-ups of All Time	Himself	Panelist
2004	Shorties Watchin' Shorties	Himself	Stand-up (2 episodes)
2004	Last Laugh '04	Himself	
2005	The Greg Giraldo Show	Himself/host	Writer & executive producer - Comedy Central pilot
2005	Comedy Central Roast of Jeff Foxworthy	Himself	Roaster
2005	Comedy Central Roast of Pamela Anderson	Himself	Roaster
2005	Gone Hollywood	Himself/host	Writer & co-executive producer (Unaired pilot later became The Showbiz Show with David Spade)
2005–2007	Friday Night Stand-Up with Greg Giraldo	Himself/host/Various	Writer - In 2006, the title was changed to Stand-Up Nation with Greg Giraldo.
2005	Dave Attell's Insomniac Tour	Himself	Stand-up
2005	Last Laugh '05	Himself	
2005–2010	Just For Laughs	Himself	Stand-up, writer (3 appearances)
2006	Tattoo Fixation	Himself	A&E special
2006	Howard Stern On Demand	Himself	
2006	Comedy Central Roast of William Shatner	Himself	Roaster
2006	Drive/II		Pilot
2006	Last Laugh '06	Himself	
2007	Adult Content with Greg Giraldo	Himself	Writer - Comedy Central pilot
2007	Comedy Central Roast of Flavor Flav	Himself	Roaster
2008	Caiga Quien Caiga (CQC)	Himself	U.S. pilot of Argentine show
2008	Comedy Central Roast of Bob Saget	Himself	Roaster
2008	The Gong Show with Dave Attell	Himself	Judge
2008	Lewis Black's Root of All Evil	Himself	
2008	Cheech & Chong: Roasted	Himself	Roaster
2008	Z Rock	Harry Braunstein	IFC show; appeared in 3 episodes
2009	Comedy Central Roast of Larry the Cable Guy	Himself	Roaster
2009	Martin Short: Let Freedom Hum	Himself	TBS special
2009	Comedy Central Roast of Joan Rivers	Himself	Roaster
2009	Burned: The Roasts' Most Outrageous Moments	Himself/host	
2009	Midlife Vices	Himself	Stand-up
2010	Jimmy Kimmel Live!	Himself	Stand-up
2010	The Marriage Ref	Himself	
2010	Last Comic Standing	Himself	Judge
2010	Comedy Central Roast of David Hasselhoff	Himself	Roaster

=== Film ===
Year(s)	Title	Role	Notes
1999	Game Day	Zippy	
2000	Choices	Mike	Directed by Steve Klein
2000	Eventual Wife	Jim	Short film
2002	American Dummy	Dr. Mabuse	Short film
2002	Comedian	Himself	
2006	Dave Attell's Insomniac Tour	Himself	
2008	What Blows Up Must Come Down!	Jihad Joe	Short film
2010	Joan Rivers: A Piece of Work	Himself	
2010	I Am Comic	Himself	

== Discography ==
- Underwear Goes Inside the Pants (2004) Universal Music
- Good Day to Cross a River (2006) Comedy Central Records
- Midlife Vices (2009) Comedy Central Records
