= Pudgy (comedian) =

American comedian (1946–2007)

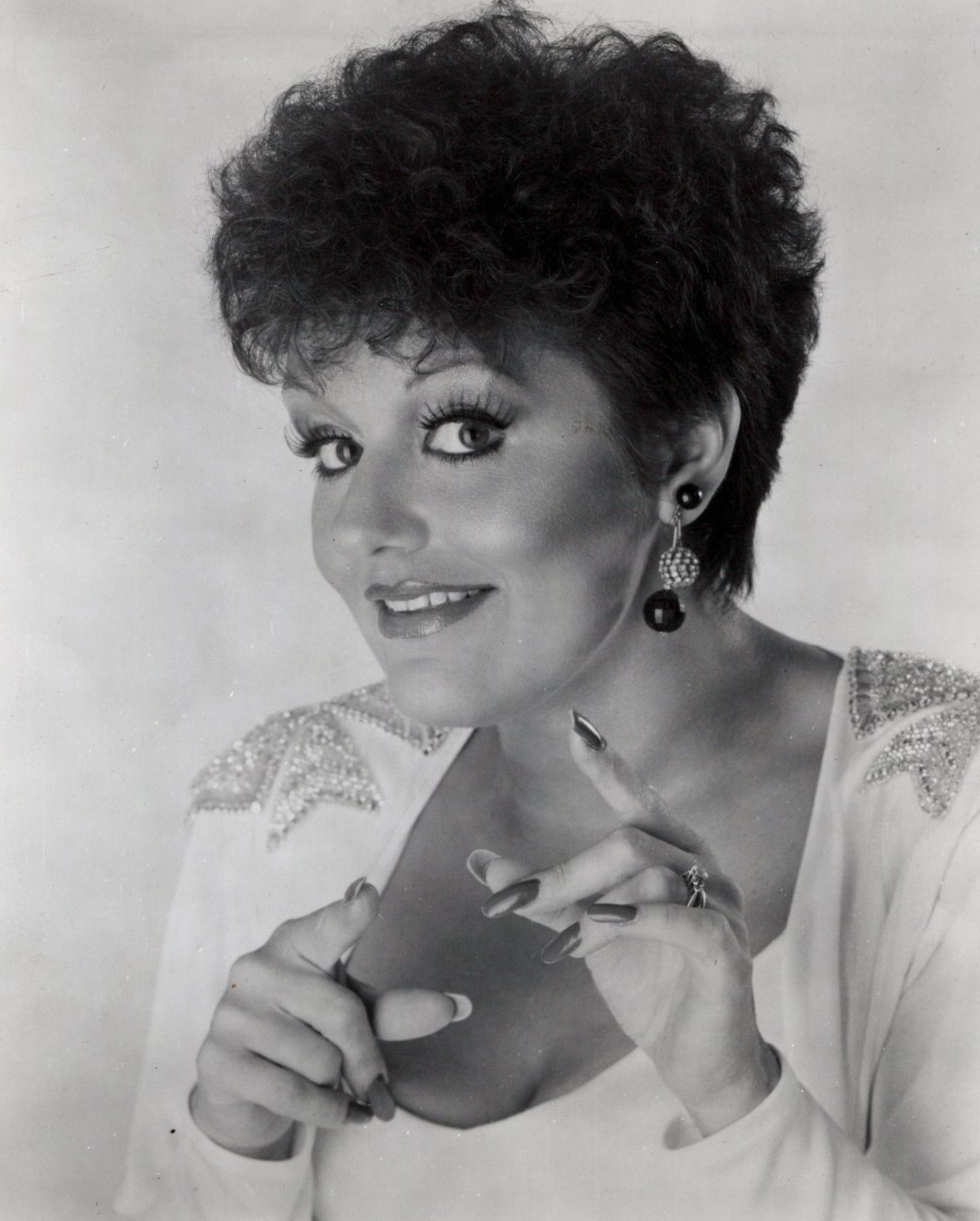
- Pudgy in 1980
- Born: Beverly Wisniewski; March 19, 1946; Chicago, Illinois, U.S.
- Died: December 24, 2007 (aged 61); Las Vegas, Nevada, U.S.
- Other names: Beverly Wines; Beverly Cardella; Pudgy Cardella
- Education: Steinmetz High School; Wright Junior College
- Spouse: Michael Cardella (m. 1979)
- Children: 3

Comedy career
- Years active: 1975–2007
- Medium: Stand-up; television
- Genres: Observational comedy; insult comedy; burlesque
- Subjects: American culture; current events; religion; self-deprecation

Beverly Wisniewski (March 19, 1946 – December 24, 2007), known professionally as Pudgy (stylized as Pudgy!), was an American stand-up comedian and singer.

Nicknamed the "Queen of Tease", she was honored as Rising Comedy Star of the Year by the American Guild of Variety Artists in 1981. The Association of Comedy Artists presented her with their Charlie Award for Best Female Comedian in 1982.

Known for her impeccable crowd work, Wisniewski starred in multiple TV specials for the Showtime network. She also starred in the second season of the E! reality series Vegas Showgirls: Nearly Famous.

== Early life and education ==
Born in Chicago, Wisniewski was given the nickname "Pudgy" by her father when she was an infant. The nickname was bestowed due to her chubby cheeks. She credited her father, a milkman with a dry sense of humor, as her inspiration for taking up comedy. Her family was of German and Polish heritage.

In her youth, Wisniewski played a small role in a community theatre production of Bye Bye Birdie, which she credited as her first experience in entertainment. She graduated from Steinmetz High School in 1963. Wisniewski considered becoming a mortician, applying to Worsham Mortuary College before deciding against it. She attended Wright Junior College for three semesters, but dropped out before graduating to join beauty school and become a hairdresser.

After developing an allergy to hair care products, Wisniewski left hairdressing to become a waitress. At Toffenetti's Chicago restaurant, she began telling jokes, earning her a following amongst local dignitaries including Richard M. Daley, Joel Daly and Harry Volkman.

== Career ==
=== 1975–1979: Cabaret work and transition to stand-up ===
Wisniewski was discovered by pianist Les Tucker while she was singing "Hard Hearted Hannah (The Vamp of Savannah)" and telling jokes about her restaurant job at an open mic. He gave Wisniewski regular work as a cabaret entertainer in 1975, allowing her to adopt the stage name Beverly Wines and quit waitressing.

Local cabaret singers Cathy Ford, Karen Mason and Nan Mason befriended Wines and were supportive of her career transition.

Adopting the stage name Pudgy, she opened for Barbara Eden at the Hyatt Regency O'Hare in 1977. Genie Campbell of the Daily Herald favorably compared Pudgy's performance to that of a young Totie Fields, opining that she should be a headliner.

Gary Chichester made her a regular performer at the newly-opened Center Stage gay club in 1978.

She expanded her stage name to Pudgy Cardella in 1979 after marrying singer Michael Cardella, who became her manager. The couple met in 1978 while she was performing at Punchinello's on Rush Street, and they worked together to develop her act for a national audience.

Author Robert Greenman described Pudgy's stand-up act:

Pudgy's style is to "work a room." The frenetic comedian, whose other name is Beverly Cardella, stalks the tables of a nightclub, insulting guests in a style somewhat reminiscent of Don Rickles but with less reliance on name calling or criticism of people's appearances.

Chicago restaurateur Arnie Morton hired Pudgy to headline a 1979 party he threw for Hugh Hefner at Zorine's to celebrate the 25th anniversary of Playboy.

William Morris Agency signed Pudgy, leading to her first bookings outside of Chicago.

=== 1980–1983: Success in Hollywood, television specials ===
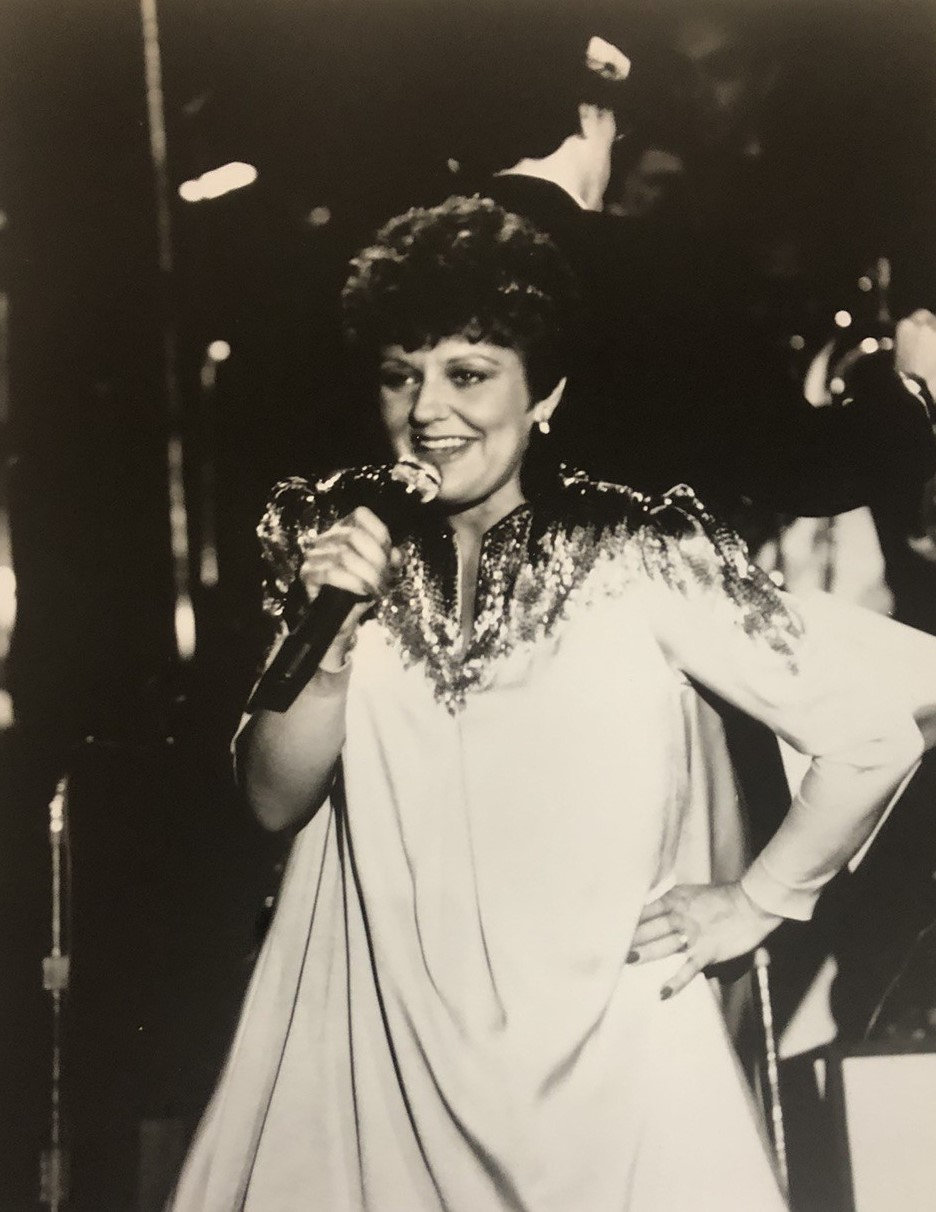
Pudgy filming The Unpredictable Pudgy! aboard RMS Queen Mary, 1983

After selling out New York's supper clubs, she began playing Los Angeles, and her act became popular among celebrities at the Studio One cabaret in West Hollywood.

Pudgy appeared in the 1980 HBO special Don Rickles and His Wise Guys, and she often credited Don Rickles for supporting her early career and giving her that platform.

In 1981, she was named Rising Comedy Star of the Year by the American Guild of Variety Artists.

Her first Showtime special Ladies Night Out Starring Pudgy! was filmed in 1982 at the Chippendales nightclub in Los Angeles. That same year, she was presented with the Charlie Award for Best Female Comedian by the Association of Comedy Artists.

Showtime filmed The Unpredictable Pudgy! in 1983 aboard RMS Queen Mary in Long Beach, featuring Pudgy performing before a celebrity-filled crowd.

The comedian moved with her family to the Chicago suburb of Deerfield, Illinois, by the end of 1983.

=== 1984–1992: Return to the East Coast ===
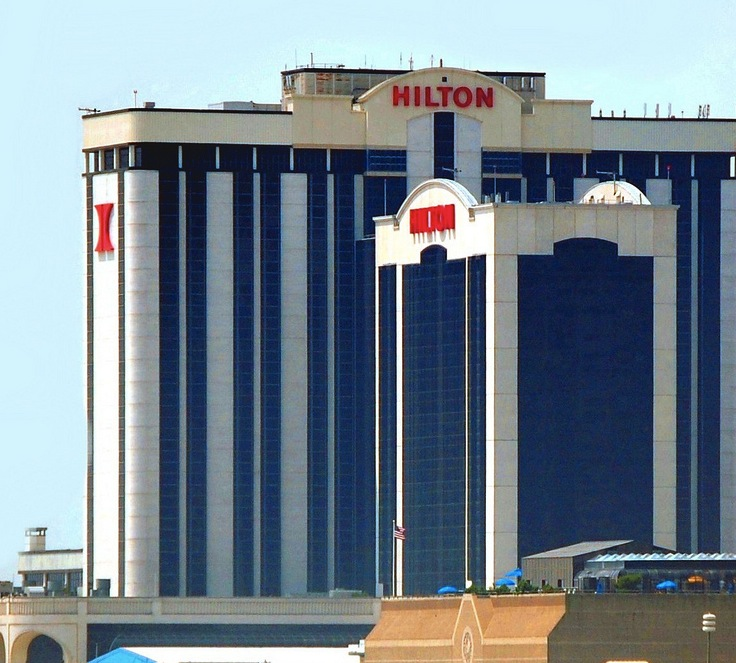
Bally's Grand, which built Pudgy's Parlor to honor the comedian in 1992

Pudgy had a 1985 residency at Atlantis Hotel and Casino, opening for acts including Jerry Lewis, Sérgio Mendes and Bobby Vinton. Don Rickles' longtime manager Joseph Scandore considered signing Pudgy after seeing her show during this residency, but they could not come to terms.

She filmed an unsold pilot for Paramount Television in 1986, a daily call-in show where Pudgy would have discussed that afternoon's soap opera broadcasts with viewers.

Pudgy performed at The Pump Room's 50th birthday gala in 1988 with Morey Amsterdam and Rose Marie.

In 1989, she starred as Sister Mary Regina in the musical Nunsense when it played for two months at Harrah's Atlantic City.

Pudgy returned to Los Angeles in 1990 to headline the opening of The Improv's new cabaret space, with Jaye P. Morgan as her warm-up act.

Following her 1992 residency at Bally's Grand, the casino built a new cabaret space called Pudgy's Parlor to honor the comedian.

=== 1993–2007: Burlesque work and final years ===
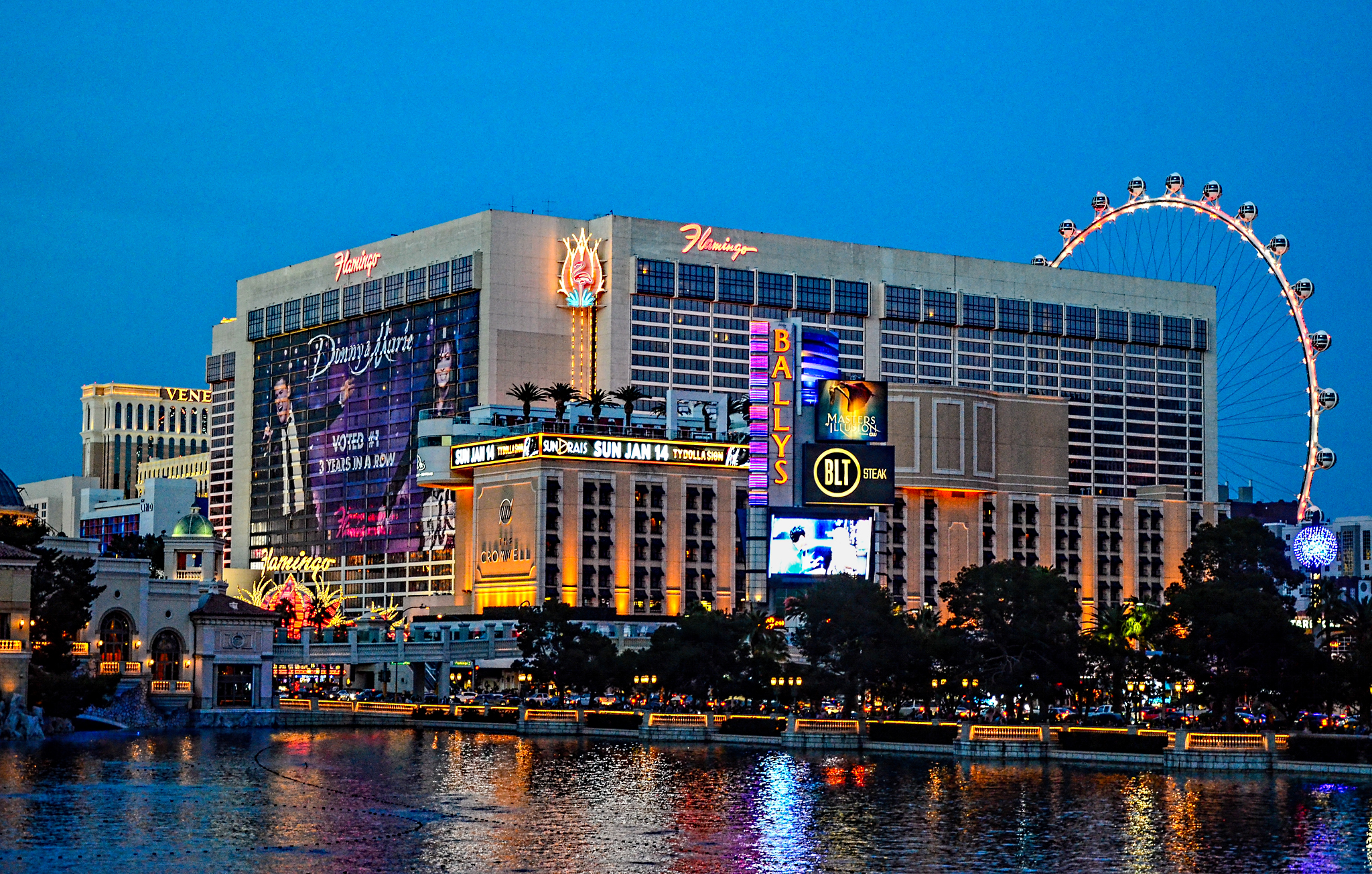
Flamingo Las Vegas, where Pudgy gave her final performance in 2007

Pudgy moved with her family to Las Vegas in 1993, where she began working comic relief for the burlesque show "Crazy Girls" at the Riviera. In 1995, she appeared on The John Debella Show to promote her ongoing engagement with "Crazy Girls".

She returned to Chicago in 1997 to launch her Gotta Heart Tour. Later that year, Pudgy starred in "Camouflage aux Folles" at the Trump Taj Mahal in Atlantic City.

She starred in "More Glitz" at Grand Casino Biloxi in 1999.

Pudgy performed in "Skintight" at Harrah's Las Vegas in 2003, and starred in the second season of the E! reality show Vegas Showgirls: Nearly Famous that documented its production.

Beginning in 2006, Pudgy regularly performed in "X Burlesque" at Flamingo Las Vegas.

== Death and legacy ==
She was "the next big thing," but because she had us (her three children), that was her main focus. She didn't want to do the Hollywood parties or whatever it took. We were her priority.

— Michael Cardella Jr.

Pudgy died of a heart attack on December 24, 2007, after having performed earlier that evening in "X Burlesque" at Flamingo Las Vegas. She had previously undergone bypass surgery in 1996.

Her freeform style of comedy won over live crowds, but without traditional written jokes, Pudgy was unable to get booked on network outlets such as The Tonight Show that would have exposed her to a wider audience. She had a loose format for her shows and refused to plan material ahead of time, preferring to go into each performance without seeing the audience beforehand.

Joan Rivers had Pudgy escorted out of an L.A. Improv show in 1982, accusing her of joke theft. Rivers was a regular guest host of The Tonight Show at that time. Pudgy's husband denied Rivers' claim since her style of comedy made joke theft unnecessary, but believed the incident hurt her career.

Phyllis Diller broke down Pudgy's sustained appeal: "She has a genius for people's names. She can remember so much. You can see her four shows a night and never see the same thing. And the way she uses her eyes, it's such a putdown. You take all of that, rolled up into one and add her sheer energy: I'm a mad fan."

== Personal life ==
Pudgy performed at the first International Mr. Leather competition in 1979, and was a supporter of the LGBTQ community.

She was politically conservative in her youth, having supported the Richard Nixon 1972 presidential campaign. In 1986, Pudgy headlined a fundraiser for Democratic Chicago mayor Harold Washington at Navy Pier Auditorium.

Pudgy and Michael Cardella had three children together.

== Influences ==
=== Pudgy's influences ===
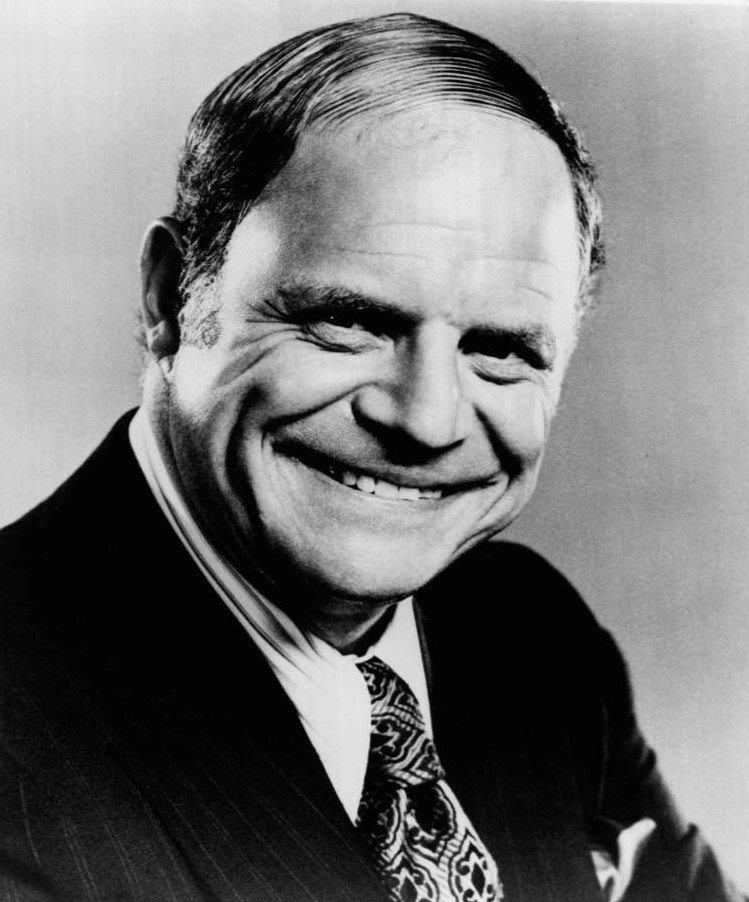
Don Rickles, who Pudgy admired and was often compared with

Pudgy named her favorite entertainers as Don Rickles, Howie Mandel, Jackie Mason, Jerry Lewis, Jerry Seinfeld, Mal Z. Lawrence, Mel Brooks, Milton Berle, Phyllis Diller, and Totie Fields.

Often referred to as the "female Don Rickles", she welcomed the comparison, but disliked being described as an insult comic. Pudgy explained: "A man can use four-letter words and be effective. A woman can't."

Her favorite films were Funny Girl, Giant, Good Morning, Vietnam, The Idolmaker, and The World According to Garp.

=== Comedians influenced by Pudgy ===
Andy Cohen was a fan of Pudgy, stating he wore out his VHS recording of Ladies Night Out Starring Pudgy! after repeatedly showing it to family and friends.

Rosie O'Donnell personally requested that Pudgy headline her VH1 series Stand-Up Spotlight in 1991.

Pudgy mentored Chicago cabaret singer Daryl Nitz, who described her as his role model. San Francisco comic Tony Sparks, founder of the city's famed BrainWash Cafe open mic, named Pudgy as his all-time favorite comedian.

== Filmography ==
=== Television ===
Year	Title	Role	Notes	Ref.
1979	The Phil Donahue Show	Herself	1 episode	
1980	The Mike Douglas Show	Herself	1 episode	
1980	The Tomorrow Show	Herself	1 episode	
1980	Don Rickles and His Wise Guys	Herself	HBO special	
1981	Madame in Manhattan	Herself	Showtime special	
1981–1984	The Merv Griffin Show	Herself	2 episodes	
1982	Ladies Night Out Starring Pudgy!	Herself	Showtime special	
1982	People Now with Mike Douglas	Herself	1 episode	
1982	An Evening at the Improv	Herself	1 episode	
1983	The Unpredictable Pudgy!	Herself	Showtime special Alternate title: Pudgy! Aboard the Queen Mary	
1985	Comedy Tonight	Herself	1 episode	
1986	Untitled (Paramount)	Herself	Pilot (unaired)	
1986–1987	The New Hollywood Squares	Herself (panelist)	10 episodes	
1987	Hamtramck	Herself	Pilot (unaired)	
1987	Regis Philbin's Lifestyles	Herself	1 episode	
1987	Live on City Line	Herself	1 episode	
1987	The Morning Program	Herself	1 episode	
1990	Caroline's Comedy Hour	Herself	1 episode	
1991	Stand-Up Spotlight	Herself	1 episode	
1997	The Celeste Johnson Show	Herself	1 episode	
1997	The Johnny Petillo Show	Herself	1 episode	
1998	The Entertainment Files	Herself	1 episode	
2003	Vegas Showgirls: Nearly Famous	Herself	13 episodes	

== Awards and nominations ==
Awards and nominations
Year	Award	Category	Work	Result	Ref.
1981	American Guild of Variety Artists	Rising Comedy Star of the Year	—N/a	Won	
1982	Association of Comedy Artists	Charlie Award for Best Female Comedian	—N/a	Won	
