= Jesse Joyce =

American stand-up comedian

Jesse Joyce (born September 24, 1978) is an American stand-up comedian, Emmy Nominated and WGA Award winning writer. Joyce has made many television appearances, including Jimmy Kimmel Live, Comedy Central's @midnight with Chris Hardwick, Comedy Underground with Dave Attell, Live At Gotham, The Tonight Show With Jay Leno, Last Call with Carson Daly, AXS's Gotham Comedy Live, Comedy.TV, AMC's Date Night, Comedy Central's Roast Battle, Seeso's The Guest List and was a regular guest on History Channel's I Love The 1880s and VH1’s Big Morning Buzz Live with Carrie Keagan. He was a recurring guest on Red Eye with Greg Gutfeld and was a semi-finalist on the 2010 season of Last Comic Standing. In addition he has written for numerous television specials and award shows, most notably the 85th Academy Awards, 90th Academy Awards, and 95th Academy Awards, the 72nd Emmy Awards, the 71st Tony Awards and the Comedy Central Roasts.

== Early life and education ==
Joyce was born in Pittsburgh, Pennsylvania. He is a graduate of Bishop Canevin High School and Duquesne University in Pittsburgh with a dual major in Studio art and communication and a minor in art history. While in high school he attended art classes at Carnegie Mellon University. He first took the stage as a comedian while working as a barback/janitor at The Pittsburgh Funnybone at the age of 18. Joyce continued to perform stand-up comedy while attending Duquesne in 1998.

== Career ==
After graduation, Joyce worked for a year as a designer and copywriter for Elisco Advertising in Pittsburgh; he won two ADDY Awards for his work. He took part in comedy in his spare time. He saved his money, and in 2001 he moved to New York City.

Over the next few years he made several television appearances including Comedy Central's Live at Gotham and hosting Date Night for AMC. In 2005 his manager paired him with another of his clients, Greg Giraldo, since both had recently given up alcohol and could support each other while working together. Joyce was Giraldo's opening act and writing partner until Giraldo's death in 2010. Together they wrote scripts for the many roasts which Giraldo performed, on including the Comedy Central Roasts of Flavor Flav, Bob Saget, Larry The Cable Guy, Joan Rivers, and David Hasselhoff and the TBS Celebrity Roast of Cheech and Chong. At the time of Giraldo's death, the pair had begun working on the Cringe Humor Roast of Jim Florentine, which Joyce performed in his place. He was then hired onto the staff for the Comedy Central Roasts of Donald Trump, Charlie Sheen, Roseanne, James Franco and Justin Bieber where he met and wrote for Seth MacFarlane. MacFarlane hired Joyce to write for him when he hosted the 85th Academy Awards.

Joyce was a staff writer for the first two seasons of The Burn with Jeff Ross on Comedy Central . In addition to Giraldo, MacFarlane, and Ross, Joyce has also written for Sacha Baron Cohen, Kevin Spacey, Dave Attell, Jim Norton, Johnny Knoxville, Jeff Dunham, Triumph the Insult Comic Dog and the Today Show's Matt Lauer. From 2014 through 2017 he was writer and regular guest on @midnight with Chris Hardwick In 2016 Joyce was nominated for a Primetime Emmy in the category of Outstanding Writing for A Variety Special for Triumph's 2016 Election Special on Hulu, for which he went on to win a 2017 Writers' Guild Award for Best Comedy/Variety Special. Since 2017 Jesse has been a writer for Jimmy Kimmel Live on ABC and was nominated for a 2018 and 2023 Writer's Guild Award for Best Comedy/Variety Series.

Joyce has performed for American Service Men and Women in Iraq, Kuwait, Bahrain, Qatar, Saudi Arabia, Djibouti, South Korea and Japan. He has also performed internationally in Switzerland, Ireland, China, Malaysia, Singapore and was invited to perform at the Just For Laughs Comedy Festival in 2013 in Montreal Canada.

In 2009 Joyce was chosen for the role of Price in the independent film Stags produced by Ben Barenholtz. In 2010 he was a semi-finalist on NBC's Last Comic Standing finishing in the top 20. He was a regular guest on the Fox News late night comedy program Red Eye w/Greg Gutfeld from 2009-2017. Joyce has released two albums, the first, Joyce To The World was released independently in 2005 and his sophomore album Pro Joyce was released through Rooftop Records in 2011.

== Personal life ==
Joyce is a recovering alcoholic who has been sober since June 5, 2005 and often performs at rehabilitation and recovery centers. In 2010, he married Haley Kozlowski, but the couple divorced in 2012. In 2015, he married Emily Cook.
