= Bumping Mics with Jeff Ross & Dave Attell =

- Genre: Stand-up comedy
- Directed by: Andrew Jarecki
- Starring: Jeff Ross; Dave Attell; Michelle Wolf; Amy Schumer; Gilbert Gottfried; Bob Saget; Michael Che; Paul Rudd; Nikki Glaser; Bruce Willis; Ken Jeong
- Country of origin: United States
- Original language: English
- No. of seasons: 1
- No. of episodes: 3

Production
- Production locations: Comedy Cellar, Manhattan, New York City, New York, U.S.
- Running time: 30 minutes
- Production companies: Choadville Entertainment, Inc. Enough with the Bread Already Productions; 3 Arts Entertainment; Thruline Entertainment; Jax Media

Original release
- Network: Netflix
- Release: November 27, 2018

Bumping Mics with Jeff Ross & Dave Attell is a 2018 Netflix comedy television show featuring comedians Jeff Ross and Dave Attell.

The series was directed by Andrew Jarecki.

== Overview ==
Bumping Mics follows three days with Jeff Ross and Dave Attell as their touring stand-up comedy show Bumping Mics comes to an end and features the two improvising on stage with various guests at the Comedy Cellar in Manhattan.

== Critical reception ==
Forbes wrote "What makes the series so spectacular is not just its hilarity, formatting or celebrity guests. It's its ability to portray a softer side to two of stand-up's most notoriously hard-edged personalities. Ross and Attell have built careers on being the neighborhood jerks. But, they transcend into something far deeper in this new series." Sophie Wiener, of The Daily Free Press, said the show was "crude and mean, but heartwarming".
