= Roadwork (disambiguation) =

Roadwork is when part of a road has to be occupied for work relating to the road.

Roadwork or Road Works may also refer to:

== Music ==
- Roadwork (album), a 1972 live album by Edgar Winter and his band White Trash
- Roadworks (album), a 1997 album by Shona Laing
- Roadwork (album series), a series of 2000s live albums by Motorpsycho (band)
- Roadworks (album series), a series of 2010s live albums by Joe Crabtree

== Other uses ==
- Roadwork (novel), a novel by Stephen King published in 1981
- Dave Attell: Road Work (a.k.a. "Road Work"), a 2014 stand-up comedy special starring Dave Attel

== See also ==
- Billboard Roadworks Touring Awards.
- Road (disambiguation)
- Works (disambiguation)
- Work (disambiguation)
