= Lazyboy =

Lazyboy may refer to:

- Lazyboy (musical project) or Lazy B, a musical project started by Aqua member Søren Nystrøm Rasted
- Lazyboy (band), a British band composed of Rob da Bank and Dan Carey
- La-Z-Boy, a furniture company based in Monroe, Michigan, United States
- Ronaldo Rodríguez, a Mexican mixed martial arts fighter commonly known by the nickname Lazy Boy.
