= Heidi Van Horne =

American actress, pin-up model and filmmaker

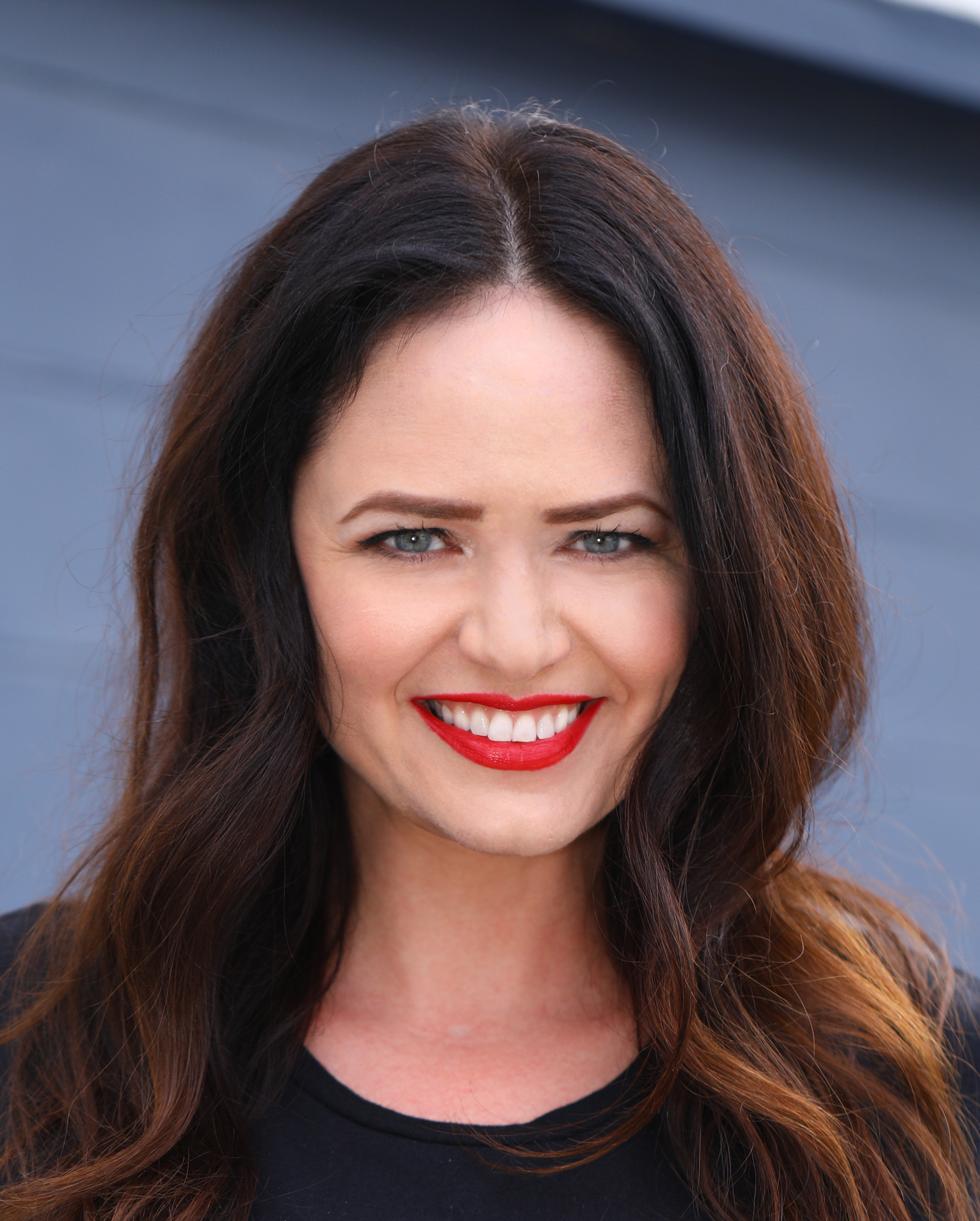
- Van Horne in January 2017
- Born: Heidi Cole Trenbath; New Jersey
- Occupations: actress; author; filmmaker; model; producer
- Years active: 1993–present
- Known for: Dazed and Confused; "Heidi's Pics" in the Houston Chronicle; "Heidi's Customs & Classics" in the Houston Chronicle; The O.C.; The Gong Show with Dave Attell
- Height: 5 ft 7 3/4 in (1.72 m)
- Website: http://www.heidivanhorne.com

Heidi Van Horne is an American actress, pin-up model, filmmaker and newspaper columnist.

== Life ==
Horne was born in New Jersey. At the age of 14, she was cast in Dazed and Confused by director Richard Linklater through which she was "Taft-Hartley'd" into the Screen Actors Guild), and thus launching her professional acting career.

Horne has acted in independent films and on TV series, including Days of Our Lives, ER, The O.C. and Gilmore Girls; and as herself including appearing as the prize girl on the revival of The Gong Show with Dave Attell for Comedy Central and Happy Madison Productions.

Horne wrote two popular newspaper columns for Hearst Publications' Houston Chronicle from 2008-2018, "Heidi's Pics", a weekly top section cover story, and "Heidi's Customs & Classics", a biweekly section cover story that was syndicated in 14 markets across the U.S. and the columns' corresponding blogs at chron.com She has authored pieces for other publications, such as Rewire.org and Traditional Rod & Kulture.

== Filmography ==
Film
Year	Title	Role	Notes
1993	Dazed and Confused	Freshman Girl #3	
2003	A Couple on the Side	Sherri	(short)
2004	Clean	Jules	
2004	Lightning Bug	Hollywood Actress	(uncredited)
2004	SoulMates	Brittney	(short)
2005	Guy in Row Five	Joey	
2009	The Master Plan	Devan	
2010	Angels Die Slowly	Angel	
2016	Making Over Molly	Self	
2020	Tick Tock	Dr. White	(short)
2022	T in Teen	Barbara	(short)
2022	broken home movies	Miss Pre	(short)

Television
Year	Series	Role	Notes
1998	Conrad Bloom	Becky	Episode: "The Spazz Singer"
2000	Days of Our Lives	Woman	Episode: #1.8818
2001	Dead Last	Sexy Bartender	Episode: "Pilot"
2003	The O.C.	Cameo	Episode: "The Countdown"
2004	ER (TV series)	Jolie	Episode: "Intern's Guide to the Galaxy"
2005	The Inside	Hottie Record Buyer	Episode: "Declawed"
2005	Gilmore Girls	Vintage Girl	Episode: "We've Got Magic to Do"
2006	The Jeff Garlin show	Phil's Hot Wife	Episode: Pilot
2006	The Vintage Vehicle Show	Self	
2008	The Gong Show with Dave Attell	Self / Prize Girl	8 episodes
2019	You (TV series)	Waitress	Episode: "Just the Tip"

== Production filmography ==
Year	Title	Director	Producer	Other Position	Notes
2009	Fit to Rock	Yes	Yes		
2016	Making Over Molly	Yes	Yes		
2016-2017	Agents of S.H.I.E.L.D.			Production Assistant	3 episodes
2017	Angie Tribeca			Production Assistant	1 episode
2022	T in Teen (short)			Co-Producer	
2022	broken home movies (short)	Yes	Yes		

== Modeling ==
Van Horne has modeled for numerous clients including multiple book covers, magazine covers and spreads; various album covers; and for several companies, including Lucky 13, West Coast Choppers, General Electric, Borgata Casino Atlantic City and Pleaser shoes.

== Book covers ==
- Go With Moon! by Laurent Bagnard/Cast Iron Productions
- Modern Vixens by Octavio Arizala/Goliath Press
- Hot Rod Pin Ups by David Perry/Motorbooks Inc.
- How to Be a Dominant Diva by Avalon Press
