= I Love New York (disambiguation) =

I Love New York is a slogan and song from an advertising campaign promoting the state of New York.

I Love New York or I Love NY may also refer to:

- I Love N.Y. (1987 film), American film
- I Love NY (2015 film), or I Love New Year, Indian film
- I Love New York (TV series), American reality television program
- I Luv NY, a Filipino soap opera
- "I Love New York", a song by Casiopea from Super Flight
- "I Love New York", a song by Madonna from Confessions on a Dance Floor
- "I Love New York", a song by Selfish Cunt
- "I Love N.Y.", a song by 1000 Clowns
- "I Love N.Y.", a song by Lazyboy featuring Lene from Lazyboy TV

== See also ==
- "I Love NYC", song by Andrew W.K. from I Get Wet
- Go Bowling at The Glen, previously named I Love New York 355, NASCAR Cup Series stock car race
- List of songs about New York City
