= Inhale Positivity =

Single by Lazyboy

from the album Lazyboy TV
- Released: 28 March 2004
- Recorded: Unknown
- Genre: Dance; Spoken word
- Length: 3:16
- Label: Universal
- Songwriter(s): Søren Nystrøm Rasted, Johnny Douglas, Toby Chapman
- Producer(s): Søren Nystrøm Rasted; Johnny Douglas

Lazyboy singles chronology
| "Underwear Goes Inside the Pants" (2004) | "Inhale Positivity" (2004) |

"Inhale Positivity" is a single from the Lazyboy musical project (known as Lazy B in the UK), released as the follow-up to the hit "Underwear Goes Inside the Pants". It features spiritual and sensual self-help advice spoken by the iconic tones of the late Patrick Allen (a renowned voice over artist and actor), set to sunny club-friendly dance music and a vocoded chorus repeating the mantra "Inhale positivity, exhale negativity". However the song did not follow up on the success of the previous single and failed to chart.

The B-side, "Spread the Love", contains outtakes from Greg Giraldo's stand-up routine on "Underwear Goes Inside the Pants" set to the music of "The Manual (Chapter 4)". It was also included as a bonus track in the 2006 UK release of LazyB TV.

== Track listing ==
1. "Inhale Positivity"
2. "Spread the Love"
3. "Man/Woman (Yin & Yang)

== Charts ==
Chart performance for "Inhale Positivity"
| Chart (2005) | Peak position |
|---|---|
| Australia (ARIA) | 78 |
