= Dave Attell: Hot Cross Buns =

- Genre: Stand-up comedy
- Directed by: Scott Gawlik
- Starring: Dave Attell
- Country of origin: United States
- Original language: English

Production
- Production locations: Cobb's Comedy Club, San Francisco, California, U.S.
- Running time: 40 minutes

Original release
- Network: Netflix
- Release: 2024

Dave Attell: Hot Cross Buns is a 2024 Netflix comedy special starring Dave Attell.

== Critical reception ==
Decider wrote "Attell introduces several of his jokes as offensive or naughty or transgressive (“I don’t care if lose my entire North Korean fanbase”), but ultimately so few of them actually are worth protesting because of just how well he has crafted not only the construction of the jokes themselves, but also in how ludicrous it sounds when he delivers them. With Attell, there’s no confusion. Just comedy."
