= Insomniac with Dave Attell =

- Genre: Travel documentary Comedy
- Created by: Dave Attell
- Written by: Dave Attell
- Directed by: Nick McKinney
- Presented by: Dave Attell
- Theme music composer: Bob Golden
- Opening theme: "Insomniac Theme"
- Country of origin: United States
- Original language: English
- No. of seasons: 4
- No. of episodes: 40 + 4 specials

Production
- Executive producer: Nick McKinney
- Producers: Dave Hamilton; Mala Chapple
- Editors: Doug Abel; Randi Snitz; Jason Goldberg; Andrew Mathason
- Running time: 21 minutes

Original release
- Network: Comedy Central
- Release: August 5, 2001 – November 21, 2004

Insomniac with Dave Attell is an American television show on Comedy Central hosted by comedian Dave Attell, which ran from August 5, 2001, until November 21, 2004.

== Overview ==
Host Dave Attell goes through a particular city at night, beginning with stand-up comedy performance at a local comedy club, then going to various bars, clubs and city landmarks.

Episodes include a visits to New Orleans, Houston, New York City, Montreal, Key West, Las Vegas, Miami, Anchorage and Chicago's world-famous The Wieners Circle.

The 30-minute program ran for four seasons on Comedy Central and continued with four one-hour specials. In 2003, two volumes of the show under the title The Best of Insomniac Uncensored were released on DVD.

The producers of Insomniac were Nick McKinney, Dave Hamilton and Mala Chapple. McKinney and Hamilton also directed all the episodes. The show's theme song and series composer was Bob Golden.

== Episodes ==
Season	Episodes	Originally released		
Season	Episodes	First released	Last released	Network
1	10	August 5, 2001	October 1, 2001	Comedy Central
2	10	January 23, 2002	May 1, 2002	Comedy Central
3	10	December 5, 2002	February 6, 2003	Comedy Central
4	10	May 29, 2003	July 31, 2003	Comedy Central
5	4	January 11, 2004	November 21, 2004	Comedy Central

=== Season 1 ===
No. overall	No. in season	Title	Original release date
1	1	"New York City"	August 5, 2001
2	2	"San Francisco"	August 12, 2001
3	3	"Miami"	August 19, 2001
4	4	"Kansas City"	August 26, 2001
5	5	"New Orleans"	September 2, 2001
6	6	"Houston"	September 9, 2001
7	7	"Memphis"	September 16, 2001
8	8	"Tijuana"	September 23, 2001
9	9	"Baltimore"	September 30, 2001
10	10	"New York City"	October 1, 2001

=== Season 2 ===
No. overall	No. in season	Title	Original release date
11	1	"Chicago"	January 23, 2002
12	2	"Philadelphia"	January 30, 2002
13	3	"Boston"	February 6, 2002
14	4	"Boise"	February 13, 2002
15	5	"Reno"	February 20, 2002
16	6	"Atlanta"	February 27, 2002
17	7	"Phoenix"	April 10, 2002
18	8	"Montreal"	April 17, 2002
19	9	"Charleston"	April 24, 2002
20	10	"New York City"	May 1, 2002

=== Season 3 ===
No. overall	No. in season	Title	Original release date
21	1	"Toronto"	December 5, 2002
22	2	"Nashville"	December 12, 2002
23	3	"Little Rock"	December 19, 2002
24	4	"Myrtle Beach"	December 26, 2002
25	5	"Cleveland"	January 1, 2003
26	6	"Albuquerque"	January 9, 2003
27	7	"Anchorage"	January 16, 2003
28	8	"Portland"	January 23, 2003
29	9	"Oakland"	January 30, 2003
30	10	"Long Island"	February 6, 2003

=== Season 4 ===
No. overall	No. in season	Title	Original release date
31	1	"Amsterdam"	May 29, 2003
32	2	"Las Vegas"	June 5, 2003
33	3	"London"	June 12, 2003
34	4	"Salt Lake City"	June 19, 2003
35	5	"Key West"	June 26, 2003
36	6	"Austin"	July 3, 2003
37	7	"Dublin"	July 10, 2003
38	8	"Honolulu"	July 17, 2003
39	9	"Columbus"	July 24, 2003
40	10	"New York City"	July 31, 2003

=== Specials ===
No. overall	No. in season	Title	Original release date
S1	1	"Dave's March on the South"	January 12, 2004
This special sees Dave visiting North Carolina, South Carolina, and Georgia.
S2	2	"Rio Dave Janeiro"	May 31, 2004
Dave visits Rio.
S3	3	"Sloshed in Translation"	August 22, 2004
This special sees Dave visiting Tokyo.
S4	4	"Insomni-Achtung, Baby!"	November 21, 2004
Dave visits Berlin.

== Critical reception ==
The New York Times, "By liberating Mr. Attell from his small stage and his brick wall, Comedy Central has helped create a remarkably robust hybrid genre: part reality TV (without the boring and predictable real people), part travel and part comedy."

G. Noel Gross in an April 2003 review for DVD Talk wrote, "A taylor-made showcase of his rapier wit, the mark of Dave's true genius, manifested with the Comedy Central debut of "Insomniac."

G. Noel Gross in a December 2003 review for DVD Talk said, "Dave Attell's hilarious graveyard-shift travelogue."

Salon, “Part of the reason it’s good is that “Insomniac” avoids the kind of gawking that most shows of its kind make their stock in trade.”

== See also ==
- Dave Attell's Insomniac Tour
