= Dave Attell: Hey, Your Mouth's Not Pregnant! =

- Directed by: Nick McKinney
- Written by: Dave Attell
- Starring: Dave Attell
- Release date: 2005
- Country: United States
- Language: English

Dave Attell: Hey, Your Mouth's Not Pregnant! is a 2005 direct-to-DVD stand-up comedy special by comedian Dave Attell.

== Critical reception ==
Iowa State Daily said "If you thought touring the country to sold-out venues would be a dream job, disorderly comedian Dave Attell sees it differently than you."

Miami New Times wrote "Can’t stay out late on a school night? You’re a pussy and don’t deserve to see Dave live and imbibed anyway."
