= Dave Attell =

American stand-up comedian (born 1965)

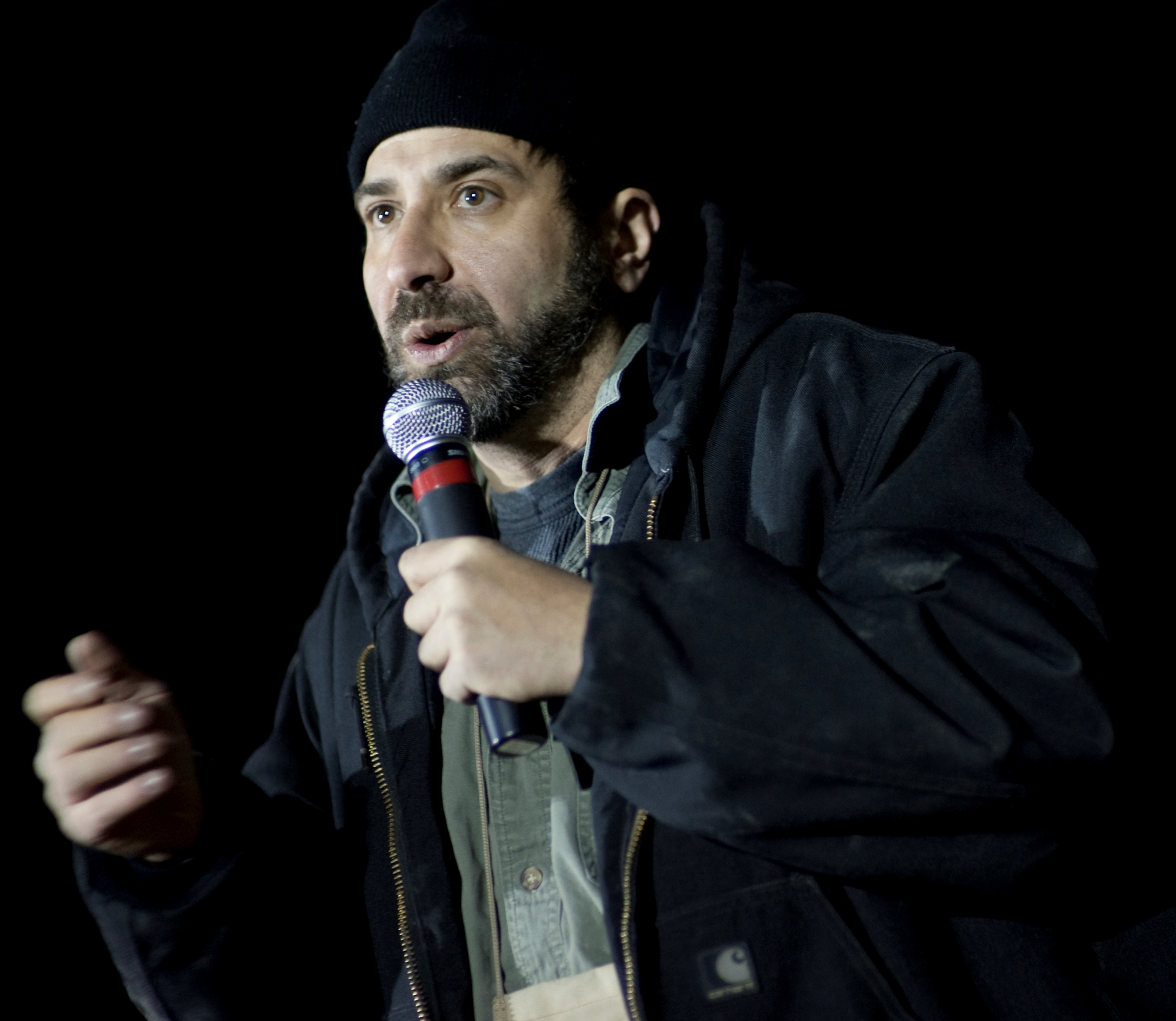
- Attell in 2009
- Born: January 18, 1965 (age 61); New York City, New York, U.S.
- Notable work: Saturday Night Live (writer, 1993–1994); The Jon Stewart Show (writer, 1993–1995); The Ugly American on The Daily Show; Insomniac with Dave Attell; The Gong Show with Dave Attell; Frank in Pootie Tang; Bumping Mics with Jeff Ross & Dave Attell; Everybody Loves Raymond

Comedy career
- Years active: 1988–present
- Medium: Stand-up, television, film
- Genres: Blue comedy; insult comedy; black comedy
- Subjects: American culture; current events; everyday life; drug use; self-deprecation; sex; religion

David Attell (born January 18, 1965) is an American stand-up comedian, actor and writer best known as the host of Comedy Central's Insomniac with Dave Attell.

== Early life ==
Attell was born on January 18, 1965, in the New York City borough of Queens to a Jewish family. He was raised in Rockville Centre on Long Island. He graduated from South Side High School.

After graduating from New York University in 1987 with a degree in communications, Attell began performing at open-mic nights.

== Career ==
Attell's first appearance on television was in 1988 on VH1's Stand-Up Spotlight, which also featured early appearances by Lewis Black, Margaret Cho, Jeff Garlin, Jay Mohr and Wanda Sykes.

On November 23, 1993, he made his first appearance on Late Show with David Letterman. The appearance was seen by Saturday Night Live creator Lorne Michaels, who then recruited Attell to be a writer and occasional performer on SNL. Attell can be seen behind Chris Farley during the "Rudy Giuliani Inauguration" sketch. Attell worked on the show for the 1993–94 season.

In 1995, Attell was featured on two HBO specials alongside up-and-comers Louis C.K. and Dave Chappelle. He was a featured performer on the 1995 Young Comedians Special hosted by Garry Shandling. He was given his own 60-minute special on the channel's HBO Comedy Showcase. Subsequently, Attell was also given an episode of HBO Comedy Half-Hour in 1997.

In 1995 and 1997, Attell appeared on Dr. Katz, Professional Therapist.

In 1999, the network issued Attell an installment in the second season of Comedy Central Presents series. The same year the network signed him as a regular commentator to its satirical news series The Daily Show, on which he appeared for three years. Attell's commentary segment was called "The Ugly American". He returned for the finale episode of host Jon Stewart's tenure.

In 2001, the television series Insomniac with Dave Attell premiered on Comedy Central. Attell described it as "Wild on E! for Ugly People".

In 2003, Attell began appearing on Tough Crowd with Colin Quinn. The show featured many of the performers he works with at the New York City comedy club the Comedy Cellar and is based on the conversations they would have off-stage at the Olive Tree Cafe, the restaurant above the club.

Attell appeared on Comedy Central's Last Laugh in 2007. His first one-hour special, Dave Attell: Captain Miserable aired December 8, 2007, on HBO. In 2008, Attell began hosting The Gong Show with Dave Attell for Comedy Central. Like the 1970s version, the show had a rotating panel of celebrity judges grading unusual acts.

In May 2008, Attell announced a casting call on his MySpace page for Comedy Central's relaunch of The Gong Show. Attell was host, along with Greg Fitzsimmons serving as head writer on the series. However, The Gong Show with Dave Attell aired only from July to September 2008.

In January 2010, he co-hosted the AVN Awards show, along with porn actresses Kirsten Price and Kayden Kross; and again in 2012 with co-hostesses Sunny Leone and Bree Olson.

Attell returned to television on Showtime beginning October 20, 2011, in Dave's Old Porn, a TV series in which Attell views and jokes about retro 1970s and 1980s pornographic films with different guest comedians. Typically, during a given show, Attell and his guest view clips that give an overview of a particular retro porn star's career. Near the end of the show, that particular actor appears and also comments on clips from some of their films.

In April 2014, Comedy Central premiered Comedy Underground with Dave Attell, a late-night stand-up comedy show taped live in New York.

His comedy special Dave Attell: Road Work aired 2014 on Comedy Central.

In 2018, he toured with Jeff Ross on the Bumping Mics Tour. Over the last three days of the tour they taped a three-part documentary series, Bumping Mics with Jeff Ross & Dave Attell for Netflix. Interspersed footage showcases the duo's interactions both off-stage and on as they return to the Comedy Cellar, where a spontaneous first performance marked the birth of their ensemble act.

In 2024, Attell released the Netflix comedy special Dave Attell: Hot Cross Buns.

== Personal life ==
Dave Attell dated comedienne Sarah Silverman in the 1990s. He has been sober since the late 2000s.

== Filmography ==
=== Films ===
| Year | Title | Role | Notes | Ref. |
|---|---|---|---|---|
| 1990 | Caesar's Salad | Policeman | Short film | |
| 1999 | Los Enchiladas! | Don | | |
| 2000 | The Office Party | Don | Short film | |
| 2001 | Pootie Tang | Frank | | |
| 2003 | Abby Singer | | Cameo | |
| 2005 | My Suicidal Sweetheart | Efram the driver | | |
| 2006 | Scary Movie 4 | Knifeman | Cameo | |
| 2007 | Twisted Fortune | Abbot | | |
| 2007 | Heckler | Himself | | |
| 2008 | The Great Buck Howard | Las Vegas Husband | Credited as David Attell | |
| 2008 | Harold | Barker | | |
| 2009 | Funny People | Himself | Cameo | |
| 2010 | Scooby-Doo! Abracadabra-Doo | The G.P.S. | Voice, direct-to-video | |
| 2015 | Trainwreck | Noam | | |
| 2017 | Gilbert | Himself | Documentary film | |
| 2018 | I Feel Pretty | Really Tan Dude | | |
| 2025 | Kinda Pregnant | Shirley's Father | | |
| TBA | The Adventures of Drunky | Belkor | Voice | |

=== Stand-up releases ===
| Year | Title | Notes |
|---|---|---|
| 1996 | HBO Comedy Half-Hour | Special |
| 1999 | Comedy Central Presents | Special |
| 2003 | Skanks for the Memories... | Album |
| 2005 | Dave Attell: Hey, Your Mouth's Not Pregnant! | DVD |
| 2006 | Dave Attell's Insomniac Tour | Special |
| 2007 | Dave Attell: Captain Miserable | Special |
| 2014 | Dave Attell: Road Work | Special |
| 2024 | Dave Attell: Hot Cross Buns | Special |

=== Television ===
| Year | Title | Role | Notes |
|---|---|---|---|
| 1988-1991 | Stand-Up Spotlight | Himself | |
| 1995–1997 | Dr. Katz, Professional Therapist | Dave | Voice, 2 episodes |
| 1996–1997 | Everybody Loves Raymond | Dave | 2 episodes |
| 2001–2004 | Insomniac with Dave Attell | Himself | 44 episodes |
| 2002 | Crank Yankers | Frank Demore | Voice, episode: "David Alan Grier & Dave Attell" |
| 2003 | Ed | Brad Campbell | Episode: "Business as Usual" |
| 2005 | Arrested Development | Himself | 2 episodes |
| 2005 | New Car Smell | Harry | Television film |
| 2008 | The Gong Show with Dave Attell | Himself | 8 episodes |
| 2011 | Dave's Old Porn | Himself | 16 episodes |
| 2013 | Inside Amy Schumer | Ghost | Episode: "Terrible People" |
| 2014 | Louie | Dave | Episode: "So Did the Fat Lady" |
| 2014 | Comedy Underground with Dave Attell | Himself | 8 episodes |
| 2014 | TripTank | Dave Attell | Voice, episode: "Roy & Ben's Day Off" |
| 2014 | Teachers Lounge | School Photographer | |
| 2015–2016 | The Jim Gaffigan Show | Himself | 3 episodes |
| 2017 | Bob's Burgers | Scalper | Voice, episode: "The Laser-inth" |
| 2017 | Difficult People | New York City | Voice, episode: "Sweet Tea" |
| 2017–2019 | Crashing | Himself | 3 episodes |
| 2018 | The Simpsons | Luke | Voice, episode: "Bart's Not Dead" |
| 2018 | Bumping Mics with Jeff Ross & Dave Attell | Himself | 3 episodes |
| 2024 | Mr. and Mrs. Smith | Kosher Food Mart Clerk | 1 episode |

=== Video games ===
| Year | Title | Role | Notes |
|---|---|---|---|
| 2004 | Outlaw Golf 2 | Commentator | |
| 2009 | Leisure Suit Larry: Box Office Bust | Merv Wallski | |
