= Jocelyn Chia =

American comedian (born 1979 / 1980)

- Born: 1979 or 1980 (age 46–47); Boston, Massachusetts, U.S.
- Education: St Nicholas Girls' School; National Junior College
- Alma mater: Georgetown University
- Occupation: Stand-up comedian
- Years active: 2013–present

Jocelyn Chia (born 1979 or 1980) is an American stand-up comedian. She was formerly a lawyer before becoming a comedian in 2013.

== Early life and education ==
Chia was born in Boston, Massachusetts. She spent her childhood in Singapore, the birthplace of her parents. She studied in St Nicholas Girls' School and National Junior College in Singapore. She then returned to the United States to earn her college degree at Georgetown University.

== Career ==
After graduating from college, Chia worked for 3 years as a corporate lawyer between 2006 and 2009.

In 2013, Chia then entered the stand-up comedy circuit, beginning her career as a comedian.

She was the head of corporate events at New York's Magnet Theater in 2014.

In 2016, she won the Ladies of Laughter competition, and was also a finalist at the 2017 New York's Funniest.

In 2017, she received the Rising Star Award – Comedy at the Asian American Television & Film Festival, and made her Comedy Central debut in 2018.

=== Stand-up routine on Malaysia and MH370 ===
On June 7, 2023, a video clip of Chia making remarks about the retrospective effects of Malaysia's expulsion of Singapore and the missing Malaysia Airlines Flight 370 in an audience interaction during a stand-up routine, performed at Comedy Cellar in New York City, became viral on social networks. The clip drew criticism from some Malaysians, who deemed it "crude" or "insulting". TikTok removed the original video for "breach[ing] community guidelines and depicting discriminatory content". One hundred protesters from the United Malays National Organisation (UMNO) protested outside the United States Embassy in Kuala Lumpur in response to Chia's performance and called to "ban" her from Malaysia. Malaysian comedian Jason Leong supported Chia's routine, earning rebuke from some, while Harith Iskander urged caution to fellow comedians that their content could easily be taken out of context. Singaporean entertainer Kumar criticised Chia. The Singaporean ambassador to Malaysia apologised on her behalf. Vivian Balakrishnan, Singapore's Foreign Minister, condemned Chia's jokes.

Chia responded that the clips had lacked the necessary context, with the segment being condensed into a short clip for social media, and that it was performed at the comedy club for more than a year and half without issues. A few days later, the Royal Malaysia Police (RMP) stated that they would be making an application with Interpol to seek for Chia's full identity and whereabouts, without providing further details. During her interview with the BBC, Chia added that Malaysia's reactions to her jokes as being "ridiculous" and that it's only making her more famous. Despite the RMP's claim of an application with Interpol, on June 14, 2023, Interpol stated with CNA that there was no request for assistance from Malaysia. Its spokesperson also added that any request for assistance must be "compliant with Interpol's Constitution which forbids any activities which are religious, racial, military or political in nature" and that "any request associated with offences related to freedom of expression would also be assessed in line with international human rights standards."

== Personal life ==
Chia is American. She previously held Singaporean citizenship by descent but had to renounce it in adulthood as Singaporean nationality law does not permit multiple citizenships.
