= Lazyboy TV =

Studio album by Lazyboy
- Released: 2 November 2004
- Recorded: Early 2004
- Genre: Pop, spoken word
- Length: 51:43 (US release)
- Label: Universal Music Denmark
- Producer: Johnny Douglas; Soren N. Rasted; Tony Swain

Lazyboy TV is the 2004 album by pop music/spoken word project Lazyboy (known as Lazy B in the UK). The album contains trivia, philosophical advice, stand-up comedy and social commentary on American society spoken over contemporary hip hop-esque beats. The project was initiated by producers Søren Rasted (of the bands Aqua and Hej Matematik) and Johnny Douglas, who dubbed the style "Rhythm'n'Speak". Performers featured include American comedian Greg Giraldo, British voice-over artist Julie Berry and singer Toby Chapman.

In many countries several songs from the album were re-dubbed in various languages. The Japanese release, for example, featured Japanese language versions of "Facts of Life", "Inhale Positivity", "This is the Truth", "We Only Read the Headlines" and "The Manual (Chapter 4)", with the original English versions of the first two featured as bonus tracks.

Initial European and Japanese pressings included the song "I Love N.Y." featuring Lene Nystrøm on vocals, also formerly of Aqua. Subsequent releases removed the song for unknown reasons and substantially changed the track listing.

Many copies came with four music videos—"Underwear Goes Inside the Pants", "Facts", "Inhale", and "Manual"—either on a bonus DVD or as enhanced content on the disc. Original pressings of the bonus DVD also included the video for "I Love N.Y.". The song "DVD Players" is hidden approximately 11 minutes of silence after the final track.

The single "Underwear Goes Inside the Pants" was a success in Australia and reached number five, and it was also the most-downloaded song on iTunes for that week. The accompanying music video got regular airplay on MTV, along with the video for "Facts of Life". However, the album release as well as the third single, "Inhale Positivity", failed to reach the charts anywhere in the world.

== Track listing ==
1. "Are You Qualified?" – 3:26
2. "Facts of Life" – 3:57
3. "Inhale Positivity" – 3:16
4. "This Is the Truth" – 4:01
5. "Underwear Goes Inside the Pants" – 4:54
6. "Man Woman (Yin & Yang)" – 3:54
7. "Desiderata" – 3:39
8. "We Only Read the Headlines" – 3:41
9. "The Manual (Chapter 4)" – 3:36
10. "It's All About Love" – 4:00/"DVD Players" (hidden track) – 1:11
11. "Spread the Love" (UK bonus track)

Original pressing

1. "Are You Qualified?" – 3:26
2. "Facts of Life" – 3:57
3. "Inhale Positivity" – 3:16
4. "Desiderata" – 3:39
5. "I Love N.Y." (featuring Lene) – 3:39
6. "The Manual (Chapter 4)" – 3:36
7. "Underwear Goes Inside the Pants" – 4:54
8. "Man Woman (Yin & Yang)" – 3:54
9. "This Is the Truth" – 4:01
10. "We Only Read the Headlines" – 3:41
11. "It's All About Love" – 4:00/"DVD Players" (hidden track) – 1:11

Bonus DVD

1. "Underwear Goes Inside the Pants" – 4:54
2. "Facts of Life" – 3:57
3. "Inhale Positivity" – 3:16
4. "I Love N.Y." (featuring Lene) – 3:39 (only on original pressing)
5. "The Manual (Chapter 4)" – 3:36
