= Underwear Goes Inside the Pants =

Single by Lazyboy featuring Greg Giraldo

from the album Lazyboy TV
- Released: 26 April 2004
- Recorded: 2004
- Genre: Spoken word
- Length: 4:54
- Label: Universal
- Songwriters: Johnny Douglas; Greg Giraldo; Lasee Mosegaard Jensen; Søren Nystrøm Rasted
- Producers: Søren Nystrøm Rasted; Johnny Douglas

Lazyboy featuring Greg Giraldo singles chronology
"Facts of Life" (2004)	"Underwear Goes Inside the Pants" (2004)	"Inhale Positivity" (2004)

"Underwear Goes Inside the Pants" is a song by Norwegian musical project Lazyboy, which was formed by former Aqua member Søren Rasted. A musical project combining spoken word with hip hop beats and other musical styles, the vocals on this track were performed by stand-up comedian Greg Giraldo. Giraldo speaks in an observational humour style critical of American society, discussing issues such as the legalisation of marijuana, the homeless problem, and the obesity epidemic. The accompanying music video was shot in Los Angeles with homeless people singing the chorus. The song was a hit in Australia in 2005, reaching number five. It was released in the UK on 21 August 2006, and it peaked at number 30 on the UK Singles Chart.

== Track listing ==
1. "Underwear Goes Inside the Pants" – 4:55
2. "Underwear Goes Inside the Pants" (Nobody Beats the Beats Remix) – 4:01
3. "It's All About Love..." – 4:03
4. "Underwear Goes Inside the Pants" (video)

== Charts ==
Chart performance for "Underwear Goes Inside the Pants"
Chart (2005–2006)	Peak position
Australia (ARIA)	5
Scottish Singles Sales (Official Charts)	25
UK Singles (Official Charts)	30

== Certifications ==
Certifications for "Underwear Goes Inside the Pants"
Region	Certification	Certified units/sales
Australia (ARIA)	Gold	35,000^{^}
^{^} Shipments figures based on certification alone.
