= The Gong Show with Dave Attell =

Television series

- Created by: Chris Bearde
- Directed by: Michael Dimich
- Presented by: Dave Attell
- Country of origin: United States
- Original language: English
- No. of seasons: 1
- No. of episodes: 8

Production
- Executive producers: Jennifer Heftler; Dave Attell; Adam Sandler; Jack Giarraputo; Allen Covert
- Running time: 22 minutes
- Production companies: Happy Madison Productions; GOLDer Productions; Sony Pictures Television

Original release
- Network: Comedy Central
- Release: July 17 – September 4, 2008

Related
- The Gong Show (1976–1980, 1988–1989, 2017–2018); Extreme Gong (1998–2000)

The Gong Show with Dave Attell was a short-lived revival of the 1970s Chuck Barris comedy game show called The Gong Show, hosted by comedian Dave Attell. The show premiered on July 17, 2008. It was produced by Adam Sandler's production company Happy Madison Productions and Sony Pictures Television.

== Show format ==
Faithful to the classic format, each show presented a contest between amateur performers of often dubious talent, with a panel of three celebrity judges. If any judge considered an act to be particularly bad, he or she could strike a large gong, thus forcing the performer to stop and eliminating that contestant from the competition.

If the act survived without being gonged, the performers were given a score by each of the three judges on a scale of 0 to 500 (instead of 0 to 10), for a maximum possible score of 1,500. The contestant who achieved the highest combined score won the grand prize of $600 and a "Gong Show Championship Belt" trophy.

The final act of each show (which was interrupted by a siren and the doors closing) was usually performed by David Juskow.

The scores and prizes were brought out by Prize Girls Heidi Van Horne and Amie Harwick.

Comedian Michelle Biloon interviewed the participants backstage, mainly for the website, but clips of the interviews were played over each episode's credits.

=== Judges ===
Among the new show's celebrity judges were J.B. Smoove, Dave Navarro, Andy Dick, Steve Schirripa, Brian Posehn, Ron White, Jim Norton, Adam Carolla, Kate Walsh, Triumph the Insult Comic Dog, and Greg Giraldo.
