= Dave Attell's Insomniac Tour =

- Starring: Dave Attell; Dane Cook; Greg Giraldo; Sean Rouse
- Original language: English

Production
- Running time: 98 minutes

Original release
- Network: Comedy Central
- Release: October 2, 2005

Dave Attell's Insomniac Tour was a comedy tour featuring Dave Attell along with fellow stand-up comedians Greg Giraldo, Sean Rouse and Dane Cook which took place in Las Vegas, Nevada.

== Critical reception ==
PopMatters, “A slickly shot comedy concert filmed at the Las Vegas House of Blues, the last stop on their tour.”

DVD Talk, “Delivered more than enough solid chuckles to warrant my recommendation. If you already know these guys, you'll probably have a ball. If you don't, well, now you do.”

Maxim, "Yet Attell still steals the show. Offensive in all the right places, and tubby everywhere else, his theory on why a penguin can never be a waiter deserves to be scientific law. Separately, they are impressive, but combining like a comedy Voltron, the quartet could be the most impressive force in stand-up—with Attell forming the very bald lion head."
