= Lewis Black's Root of All Evil =

American television series

- Created by: Scott Carter; David Sacks
- Presented by: Lewis Black
- Country of origin: United States
- No. of seasons: 2
- No. of episodes: 18

Production
- Running time: 20 minutes
- Production companies: Efficiency Studios; Never Give Up Productions; Black Humour, Inc.

Original release
- Network: Comedy Central
- Release: March 12 – October 1, 2008

Lewis Black's Root of All Evil is an American television series that premiered on March 12, 2008, on Comedy Central and was hosted by comedian Lewis Black. The series was produced by Scott Carter and written by David Sacks. Sometimes there were pre-recorded video segments directed by supervising producer Michael Addis.

Lewis Black's Root of All Evil is formatted as a tongue-in-cheek mock trial acted in deadpan. Black presided over two opposing guest comedians championing a person or thing as the "root of all evil" (YouTube, beer, Oprah Winfrey, PETA, etc.). The series ended on October 1, 2008, with a total of 18 episodes. The series' cancellation was confirmed by Lewis Black in September 2009. The entire first season of Lewis Black's Root of All Evil was released on DVD in the United States on September 30, 2008. The remaining episodes from season two are not currently available on DVD.

After the show ended, it was determined that the ears of stand-up comedian Greg Giraldo was the root of all evil.

== Format ==
Each show followed the same format: Black welcomed the viewer to his courtroom and announced the two Evil candidates for the Root of All Evil. Black gave a brief history of each of the Evils and introduced the two advocates, who presented their oral arguments why their Evil is the greater. Black began his inquisition, questioning the advocates about their Evils. Usually, the answers pointed out the good or usefulness of the opponent's Evil or the greater evil of their own. Black asked the advocates to predict what would happen if their Evil continued to spread. The Ripple of Evils used absurd, comedic logic and were generally very silly. After the advocates gave their closing arguments, Black asked for the audience's opinion, which he seldom followed, and announced his verdict and the loser's sentence.

== Advocates ==
The advocates were not the same every week, but six of the eight appeared multiple times. The advocates and their Win/Loss records are:

Advocate	Wins	Losses	Ties	Poll wins	Poll losses
Andrew Daly	4	2	0	2	4
Andy Kindler	3	1	0	1	3
Patton Oswalt*	3	2	1	3	3
Kathleen Madigan	2	1	0	1	2
Greg Giraldo	2	7	0	6	3
Paul F. Tompkins*	1	4	1	3	3
Jerry Minor	1	0	0	1	0
Andrea Savage	1	0	0	1	0

- *No winner was declared in "Red States vs. Blue States". Instead, Black declared that the Root of All Evil was Puerto Rico. Therefore, the results were not counted in the Advocates' Win/Lose column. However, the audience poll declared Red States the Root of All Evil, which was counted in the Audience Poll columns.

== Episodes ==
=== Season 1 (2008) ===
No.	Advocate 1	Advocate 2	Root of All Evil	Poll winner	Original air date
1	Paul F. Tompkins for Oprah	Greg Giraldo for Catholic Church	Oprah	Catholic Church	March 12, 2008
2	Andy Kindler for Donald Trump	Greg Giraldo for Viagra	Donald Trump	Viagra	March 19, 2008
3	Paul F. Tompkins for Weed	Andrew Daly for Beer	Beer	Weed	March 26, 2008
4	Patton Oswalt for YouTube	Greg Giraldo for Porn	YouTube	YouTube	April 2, 2008
5	Greg Giraldo for Paris Hilton	Patton Oswalt for Dick Cheney	Dick Cheney	Paris Hilton	April 9, 2008
6	Patton Oswalt for High School	Andy Kindler for American Idol	American Idol	High School	April 16, 2008
7	Kathleen Madigan for Kim Jong-il	Greg Giraldo for Tila Tequila	Kim Jong-il	Tila Tequila	April 23, 2008
8	Andrew Daly for Las Vegas	Patton Oswalt for The Human Body	Las Vegas	Las Vegas	April 30, 2008

=== Season 2 (2008) ===
Season two was dedicated to the memory of George Carlin, who died on June 22, 2008, due to a heart failure; but a dedication message did not appear until the end of "Olympic Games vs. Drinking Games" on August 13, 2008.

No.	Advocate 1	Advocate 2	Root of All Evil	Poll winner	Original air date
9	Andrew Daly for Ultimate Fighting	Patton Oswalt for Bloggers	Bloggers	Bloggers	July 30, 2008
10	Greg Giraldo for Steroids	Andrew Daly for Boob Jobs	Boob Jobs	Steroids	August 6, 2008
11	Andrew Daly for Olympic Games	Greg Giraldo for Drinking Games	Drinking Games	Drinking Games	August 13, 2008
12	Andy Kindler for NRA	Paul F. Tompkins for PETA	NRA	PETA	August 20, 2008
13	Paul F. Tompkins for Red States	Patton Oswalt for Blue States	Puerto Rico	Red States	August 27, 2008
14	Kathleen Madigan for Disney	Andy Kindler for Scientology	Disney	Scientology	September 3, 2008
15	Greg Giraldo for Going Green	Andrea Savage for Spring Break	Spring Break	Spring Break	September 10, 2008
16	Paul F. Tompkins for Gen X	Andrew Daly for Baby boomers	Baby boomers	Baby boomers	September 17, 2008
17	Greg Giraldo for Strip Clubs	Kathleen Madigan for Sororities	Strip Clubs	Sororities	September 24, 2008
18	Jerry Minor for The Hills	Paul F. Tompkins for Rocket Scientists	The Hills	The Hills	October 1, 2008

== Reception ==
Even before the first episode was broadcast, Brian Lowry in Variety attacked the show, saying that the guest comedians were "second-tier" and that the set "resembles a cut-rate version of The Weakest Link set" and that "Comedy Central's programming usually falls squarely into the sublime or the ridiculous, so consider Root of All Evil a rare tweener in terms of quality—one that proves a whole lot of Black is preferable, albeit marginally, to a black hole." Attracting about 2.3 million viewers, the debut episode was the most-watched premiere episode of a Comedy Central series since the premiere of Chappelle's Show in 2003 and topped the demographics for male audiences ages 18 to 34.

Mark Dawidziak of The Plain Dealer wrote in his review, "I'm a sucker for a good Lewis rant, and sometimes Root of All Evil would benefit from more Lewis fomenting and less formula. For as long as it's around, though, it does make a good fit with a Comedy Central lineup that includes Jon Stewart, Stephen Colbert, Sarah Silverman and, of course, South Park."

The 3rd Annual Independent Investigative Group IIG Awards presented an award to Root of All Evil recognizing the promotion of science and critical thinking in popular media on May 18, 2009.

== Cancellation ==
While there was no official notice from Comedy Central, Lewis Black stated in a September 2009 interview that "the show is dead".

== Home media ==
The entire first season of Lewis Black's Root of All Evil was released on two disc DVD set in the United States on September 30, 2008. All episodes are available on iTunes.

DVD name	Release date	Ep #	Features
Season One	September 30, 2008	8	Post show interviews, "Meet Judge Black", "Meet The Lawyers", "PolitiBits", "Your Day In Court", Reno 911! - "Prostitution Sting", "What What in the Butt" parody from South Park episode "Canada on Strike", The Daily Show with Jon Stewart - "Baracknophobia", and The Colbert Report - "Cookie Monster"

== See also ==
- The Debaters - CBC comedy debate show
