= Comedy Cellar =

Comedy club in New York City

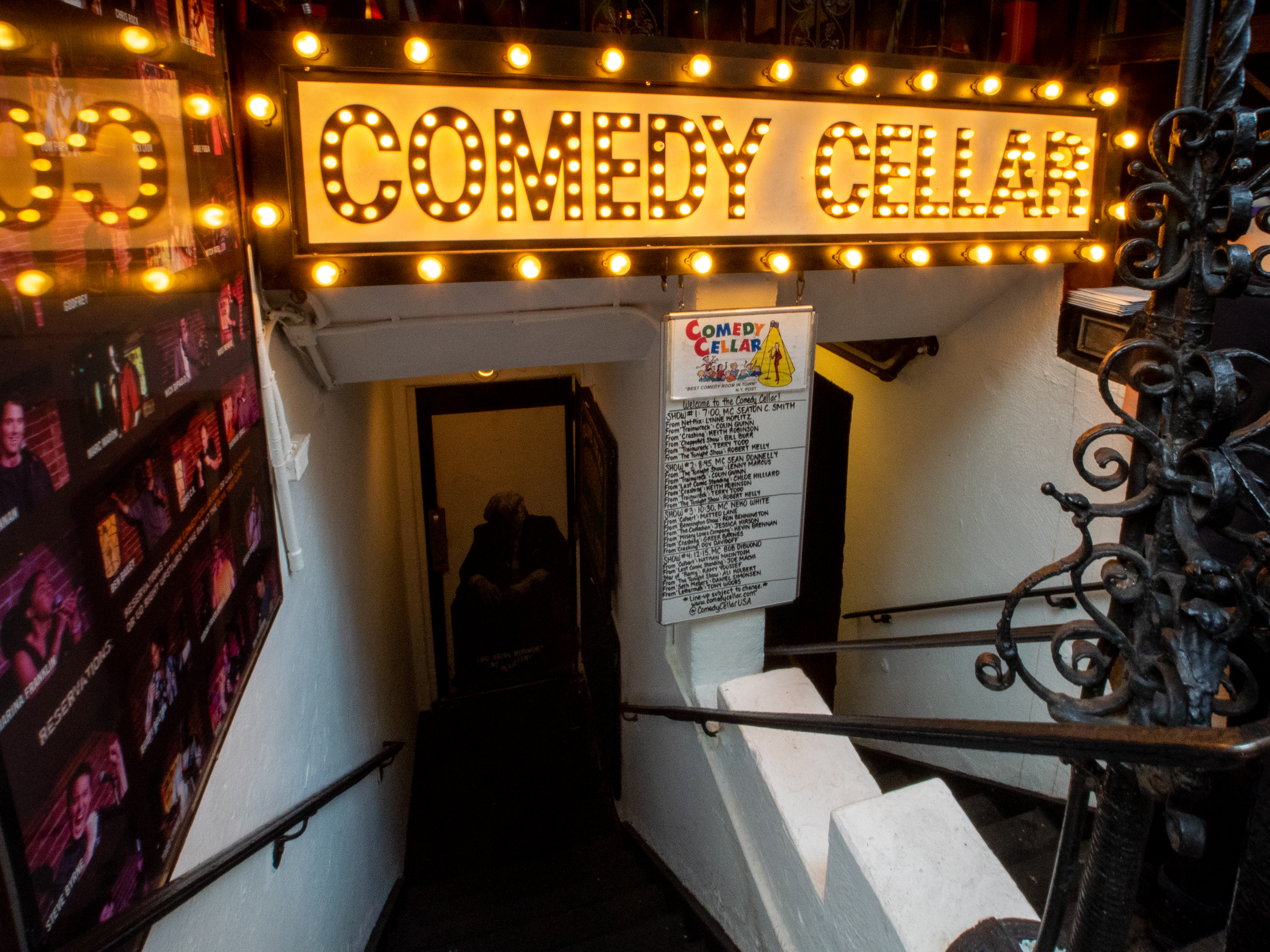
- Comedy Cellar entrance
- Interactive map of Comedy Cellar
- Address: 117 MacDougal Street
- Location: Manhattan, New York City, New York, U.S.
- Coordinates: 40.730131°N 74.000403°W
- Owner: Noam Dworman
- Type: Comedy club

Construction
- Opened: 1982 (44 years ago)

Website
- comedycellar.com

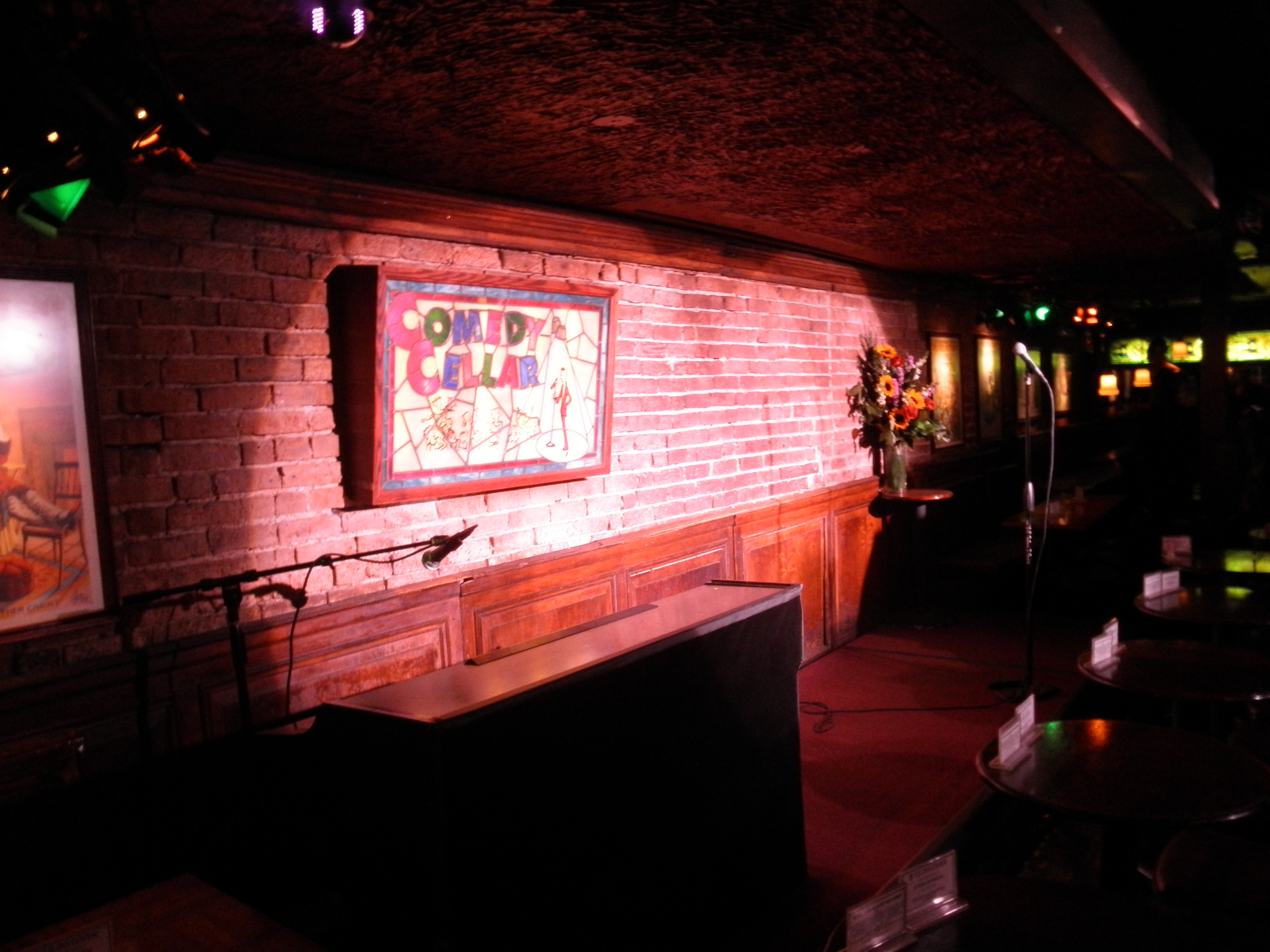
The Comedy Cellar stage as seen from the audience left

The Comedy Cellar is a comedy club in Manhattan where stand-up comics perform; it is sometimes referred to as the "Harvard of comedy clubs".

== Operations ==
It was founded in 1981 by then-stand-up comedian, and current television writer and producer Bill Grundfest. It is located in Greenwich Village on 117 MacDougal Street between West Third Street and Minetta Lane.

The club is owned by Noam Dworman, who inherited it from his late father, Manny, in 2003. It is being booked by Estee Adoram, who has developed the club's talent for nearly four decades.

Above the club is a restaurant called The Olive Tree Cafe to which it is connected, where many of the comedians hang out after performing. The businesses share the same menu, kitchen, and staff as the Olive Tree Cafe.

The Comedy Cellar, like The Comedy Store, uses a showcase format, as opposed to a headline format like most clubs. A show will consist of between five and seven comics performing sets of roughly ten to fifteen minutes each. Each week consists of three to six shows a night on Sunday through Thursday and ten shows each Friday and Saturday, between both the original room and the larger Village Underground around the corner.

=== Notable comedians ===
Notable comedians who started with stage time at the Comedy Cellar include Louis C.K., Dave Chappelle, Amy Schumer, Ali Wong, Dave Attell, Andrew Schulz, Todd Barry, Judah Friedlander, Colin Quinn, Kevin Hart, Jim Norton, Jeff Ross, Jon Stewart, Ray Romano, Darrell Hammond, Michael Mittermeier, Rich Vos, Nick Di Paolo, Artie Lange, Greer Barnes, and Marc Maron.

Popular established comedians frequently perform at the Comedy Cellar, including Dov Davidoff, Mark Normand, Ryan Hamilton, Robert Kelly, Harrison Greenbaum, Sherrod Small, Keith Robinson, Eric Neumann, Gregg Rogell, Nikki Glaser, Ben Bailey and Andrew Schulz.

Celebrity comedians Aziz Ansari and Jon Stewart started their comedy careers at the Comedy Cellar, and both continue to perform there occasionally. Other celebrity comics who have performed at the club include Sarah Silverman, Amy Schumer, Robin Williams, Patton Oswalt, Kevin Hart, Chris Rock, Patrice O'Neal, Bill Burr, and Matteo Lane. Musician John Mayer has also been seen performing stand-up.

== In the media ==
Much of Jerry Seinfeld's 2002 documentary film Comedian was filmed at the club, and it also can be seen in a 2006 Pepsi commercial starring Jimmy Fallon.

The beginning sequence of Louis C.K.'s television series Louie shows him walking into the Comedy Cellar. Many scenes in the show are filmed in and around the Comedy Cellar and Olive Tree Cafe. Speaking with ESPN's Bill Simmons about the club on a Grantland podcast in June 2012, C.K. discussed playing shows at the Cellar to empty rooms in the 1990s, stating that then-owner Manny Dworman "kept comedy alive" by making comedians perform on empty stages, in an effort to lure in potential customers.

The club was also featured in Chris Rock's 2014 film Top Five, including a performance by his character, Andre Allen. It appeared regularly on HBO's Crashing, and is the home for Comedy Central's This Week at The Comedy Cellar.

In September 2015, the club launched its public-policy debate series with a debate on the Iran nuclear deal. The debate featured professor and lawyer Alan Dershowitz and journalist Fred Kaplan, among others.

The New York Post regularly rates the Cellar as the best comedy club in New York.

In March 2016, writers Jessica Pilot and Katla McGylnn wrote an oral history of the club for Vanity Fair magazine.

The club has been the location for comedians taping Netflix specials. Aziz Ansari shot his special Nightclub Comedian at the Comedy Cellar in 2021; Ray Romano recorded his special Right Around the Corner there in 2019; Dave Attell and Jeff Ross recorded their Netflix series Bumping Mics with Jeff Ross & Dave Attell at the club in 2018.

In June 2023, a video clip from the location showed Jocelyn Chia making remarks about the retrospective effects of Malaysia's expulsion of Singapore and the missing Malaysia Airlines Flight 370 in an audience interaction during a stand-up routine, performed at Comedy Cellar in New York City, became viral on social networks.

The 2025 film Is This Thing On?, directed by Bradley Cooper and starring Will Arnett, depicts a lead character who starts doing stand-up on open mic nights at the Comedy Cellar and has actual comedians from the club in supporting roles. Comedians from the Comedy Cellar also assisted Cooper in being able to authentically portray the stand-up comedy world.

== Las Vegas location ==
In 2018, the Comedy Cellar opened a third location at the Rio Hotel in Las Vegas.
