= Dave Attell: Captain Miserable =

- Directed by: Beth McCarthy-Miller
- Written by: Dave Attell
- Starring: Dave Attell
- Distributed by: HBO
- Release date: 2007
- Country: United States
- Language: English

Dave Attell: Captain Miserable is a 2007 HBO stand-up comedy special starring Dave Attell.

== Critical reception ==
Metro Silicon Valley wrote "Scintillating raunch is available in this HBO special, with standup comedian Dave Attell performing live at the Lincoln Theater in Washington, D.C. Attell, a balding pudge with skeevy beard and friendly dark eyes, combines deeply pervy and palsy-walsy qualities in a way not seen since Telly Savalas went to that big casino in the sky."

CHUD.com said "It’s not dirty humor (which I love), it’s dirty for the sake of being dirty. There’s no substance to it. He just throws out random lame drug and sex jokes and see what sticks…. it doesn’t make for a deep or even fun stand-up experience."

DVD Talk wrote "In trying to break down why I enjoy Attell's comedy, it became clear that it's not his material that makes him so good, but his delivery. Jokes about porn, soup and pot-heads aren't breaking new ground comedically, and honestly, they are old hat for him, but with his drunken energy and unique vocal tics, including perfectly timed whispers and yelling, he can make the simplest line into something funny."
