= Jessica Pilot =

American television producer and writer

Jessica Pilot is an American producer and communications strategist. She often speaks at industry roundtables and workshops regarding her profession. She was featured on CNN for their series "The History of Comedy." In her role as a producer and storyteller, Pilot has produced several art installations and exhibits in New York City.

== Career ==
Pilot is best known as the talent booker for The Late Show with Stephen Colbert where she produced the stand up comedy segments of the show.

Pilot's writing revolves around the world of stand up comedy. Pilot has written articles that have been published in Vanity Fair, Esquire, New York magazine, The Village Voice, and other outlets.

In 2018, Pilot started a podcast called "Are We Still Talking About This?"

Pilot created a documentary series for The Village Voice titled "This is Stand Up" where she interviewed several comedians on the art form. In 2019 she created the mental health series "Hi Anxiety" for Teen Vogue.

In 2025, Pilot created the art installation "REFLECTIONS: Processing the Pandemic" and worked as an exhibit partner for "Path of Liberty" an outdoor art installation in Manhattan.
