= Lazyboy (musical project) =

Solo music project of Søren Rasted

Lazyboy is a musical project started by Aqua member Søren Nystrøm Rasted, also known as Lazy B in the UK. It uses spoken word trivia, self-help advice, voices of people on the street and criticism of modern society set to hip hop-esque beats in a style dubbed "Rhythm'n'Speak" by the creators.

The album Lazyboy TV debuted in 2004 and received some initial airplay with the video for "Facts of Life". The single release of "Underwear Goes Inside the Pants", featuring Greg Giraldo, made a name for Lazyboy, charting at #5 in Australia and topping the iTunes download chart. However, both the second single "Inhale Positivity" and the Lazyboy TV album missed the charts internationally.

In 2006, it was announced the project would change its name to LazyB for the impending UK release in July. According to the official site, LazyB was commissioned to produce a piece for the Royal Danish Ballet to commence in Copenhagen in March 2007.

On 5 December 2012, LazyB released "2012 - Shift happens". Its companion music video was directed by Alan Smithee and features footage of the past year's events. The track featured Lene Nystrøm on vocal and David Bateson on spoken word.

== Discography ==
=== Albums ===
List of albums, with selected details
Title	Details
Lazyboy TV	Released: November 2004; Label: Universal; Format: CD+DVD, digital

=== Singles ===
List of singles, with selected chart positions
Title	Year	Peak chart positions		Certification	Album
Title	Year	AUS	UK	Certification	Album
"Underwear Goes Inside the Pants"	2004	5	30	ARIA: Gold	Lazyboy TV
"Inhale Positivity"	2004	78	—		Lazyboy TV
"2012 – Shift Happens"	2012	—	—		Non-album single
