= Dave Attell: Road Work =

- Directed by: Scott Gawlik
- Written by: Dave Attell
- Starring: Dave Attell
- Distributed by: Comedy Central
- Release date: 2014
- Country: United States
- Language: English

Dave Attell: Road Work is a 2014 stand-up comedy special starring Dave Attell.

== Overview ==
Road Work is a Comedy Central stand-up special that cuts together multiple performances from Dave Attell's past tour.

== Critical reception ==
Paste wrote "As expected, Attell doesn’t hold back on disgusting and self-deprecating humor. He confesses that his genitals look more and more like a tent that no one knows how to fold and that on his best day his junk smells like a foot. His transitions make no sense at all, going from sex toys to his wishful plans of having a family, and the absurdity only makes it funnier."
