= The Vintage Vehicle Show =

The Vintage Vehicle Show, produced by Tim Stansbury and hosted by Lance Lambert, is dedicated to custom cars, hot rods and classics, although cars from vintage to present have been featured on the program.

Each episode focuses on an automotive museum, a car show, or a private collection somewhere in the United States although most episodes are located in the western United States. The program began on one station in Seattle in 1993 and is currently syndicated throughout the U.S. on 101 stations and in 27 foreign markets. As of 6/26/14 over 450 new episodes have been produced.
