= List of stand-up circuits =

Stand-up comedians are selected for bookings on the basis of how clean or dirty their act is, their popularity, and their ability to draw an audience. Circuit runners, agents, and production companies have the power to make or break a comedian's career.

== Contemporary circuits ==
=== Def comedy jam circuit ===
In its original form, HBO's "Def Comedy Jam" was an alternative to the club circuit, providing opportunities to black stand-ups and has since grown into something larger. The stylistic origins of the Def Jam comedy genre directly borrow from the hip-hop scene and the rap "arena".

=== Open mic circuit (UK) ===
The open mic scene is referred to as the open mic circuit in the United Kingdom.

=== College circuit ===
There are two associations that lead the college circuit: the Association for the Promotion of Campus Activities (APCA) (which has 200 member colleges) and the National Association for Campus Activities (NACA) (which has 1,100 member colleges). Comedians in the US and Canada audition for NACA to hundreds of college and university bookers, first with a 90-second video submission, and then a ten-minute, in-person audition to perform hour-long sets. Sets must not trigger students by "punching down", contain any denigrating material, or contain dark or blue humor; it must be "intelligent humor" and contain subjects that college-aged adults express contempt for. Higher education, that was once seen as the bastion of free speech is now criticized by some comedians for being too PC (politically correct). Some stand-ups no longer perform at colleges and universities due to an incompatibility with new audiences.

=== Cruise circuit (CLIA) ===
The Cruise Lines International Association contains 60 cruise liners. Comedians work an average of two days per week; this circuit is said to not aid in moving up in the field. Cruiseliners have both clean comedy and blue comedy at different times during the day, but opinionated political material is frowned upon. Hecklers are tolerated more in a cruise setting.

=== Corporate circuit ===
In the UK, corporate gigs are called corporates. Corporate circuit comedy must be clean comedy that neither swears nor references sexual acts; church (or "squeaky clean") comedy is preferred; two celebrities that perform this type of comedy are Jim Gaffigan and Brian Regan. In a lecture given at the University of Oxford, Stewart Lee stated that his character is unable to do corporate gigs, because he takes on the role of being superior to his audience.

==== USO Tours ====
Starting in 1941 and continuing to the present, the United Service Organizations is a nonprofit corporation that employs performers like stand-up comedians for the entertainment of the United States troops and its allies. During WWII, there were four sub-circuits: the Victory Circuit and Blue Circuit entertained stateside military personnel, the Hospital Circuit performers visited the wounded and the Foxhole Circuit performers went overseas.

=== Christian comedy circuit (CCA) ===
The Christian Comedy Association started in the 90s, in an attempt to use comedy as a "spiritual vehicle." Comedian Doug Stanhope has criticized Christian comedy. Heckling is almost nonexistent in the church circuit. Christian comedy is clean comedy that claims to help one's soul.

=== Late night television circuit ===
This form of variety entertainment gives emerging headliners guest spots to deliver their "tight five".

== Defunct circuits ==
=== Defunct American circuits ===
==== Lecture circuit ====
The lecture circuit hosted the US's precursory stand-up comedians, with humorists like Artemus Ward and Mark Twain. Twain prepared, rehearsed, revised and adapted his material for his popular humorous presentations.

==== Theatre Owners Booking Association (T.O.B.A.) ====
TOBA was started in 1912 by comedian Sherman H. Dudley in response to segregation and discrimination from social clubs, circuits, and unions.

==== Keith-Albee circuit and Orpheum circuit ====
In the era of vaudeville, the United Booking Office (UBO) controlled all the high-end theaters; B. F. Keith Circuit controlled everything east of Chicago and Orpheum controlled Chicago and everything to the west of it.

==== Chitlin' Circuit ====
The Chitlin' Circuit was a "collection of all-black venues, clubs, [and] theaters". Reopened during the Harlem Renaissance in 1934, the Apollo Theater was the performers' most sought after venue. Notable performers for this circuit include Richard Pryor, Moms Mabley, Dick Gregory, Redd Foxx, and the duo Tim and Tom.

==== Borscht Belt ====
Also called the Jewish Alps, they hired performers that included stand-up comedians. The Catskill Mountains are depicted in The Marvelous Mrs. Maisel. The booking agency, Charles Rapp Enterprises controlled most of the Catskill resorts—owning the two largest: the Concord and Grossinger's.

==== Playboy comedy circuit ====
Before the advent of full-fledged American comedy clubs, Hugh Hefner created a chain of Playboy Clubs and employed people like Dick Gregory, Mort Sahl, Steve Martin, and Lenny Bruce. Hugh Hefner ok'd Burns and Carlin at the Playboy Club Tonight, which was not recorded in a Playboy club.

=== Defunct Australian circuits ===
==== Tivoli circuit ====
The Tivoli circuit was Australian vaudeville from the late 1800s to the mid-1900s.
