= Insult comedy =

Comedy genre

Insult comedy is a comedy genre in which the act consists mainly of offensive insults, usually directed at the audience or other performers. Typical targets for insult include people in the show's audience, the town hosting the performance, or the subject of a roast. The style can be distinguished from an act based on satire, or political humor. Insult comedy is often used to deflect or silence hecklers even when the rest of the show is not focused on it.

== Performers ==
- Fred Allen, especially towards his longtime friend and industry rival Jack Benny
- Bianca Del Rio
- Greg Giraldo
- Bob Hope
- Pudgy
- Don Rickles, widely considered the master of the genre
- Jeffrey Ross, known as the "Roastmaster General" for being emcee of roasts on Comedy Central
- Rob Smigel, specifically when puppeteering Triumph the Insult Comic Dog

== See also ==
- Roast (comedy)
- The dozens
