= Stand-Up Spotlight =

- Presented by: Rosie O'Donnell
- Country of origin: United States
- Original language: English

Original release
- Release: 1988 – 1991

Stand-Up Spotlight is a VH1 stand-up comedy television series.
