= Stand-up comedy =

Comedy style where the performer addresses the audience directly

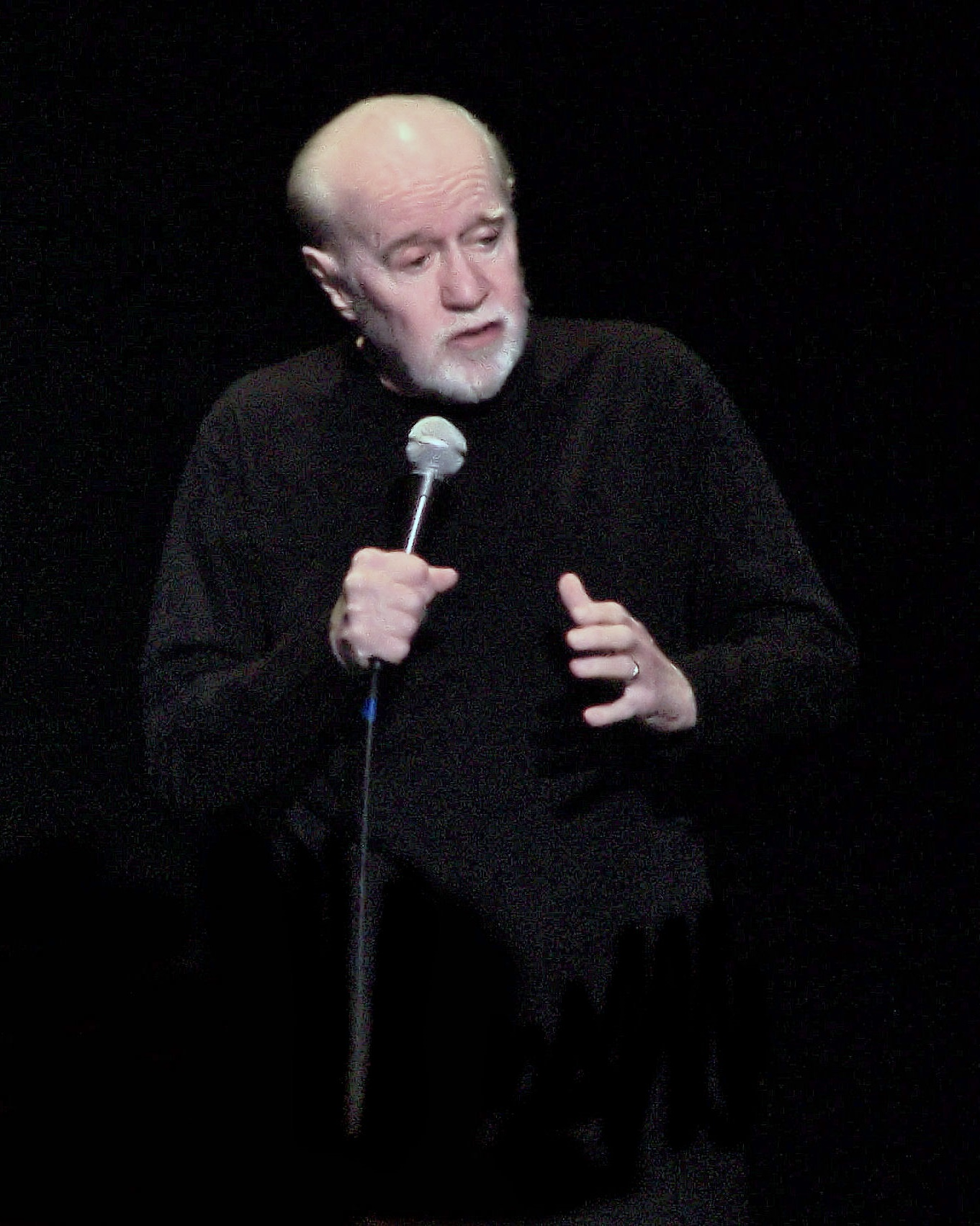
George Carlin performing in 2008

Stand-up comedy is an art form that involves a stand-up comic and an audience. Comics perform on a stage and deliver humorous and satirical monologues, sometimes incorporating physical acts (act outs). These performances are typically composed of tightly crafted sets or acts, and often include varying degrees of live crowd interaction (crowdwork). Stand-up comedy consists of one-liners, stories, observations, or shticks that can employ props, music, impressions, dialects, magic tricks, or ventriloquism.

Performances can take place in various venues, including comedy clubs, comedy festivals, bars, nightclubs, colleges, casino showrooms, or theaters. During the COVID-19 pandemic, comics performed using video conferencing tools, on social media, on rooftops, parking lots and other open-air locations.

== History ==
Stand-up comedy originated in various traditions of popular entertainment in the late 19th century. These include vaudeville, the stump-speech monologues of minstrel shows, dime museums, concert saloons, freak shows, variety shows, medicine shows, American burlesque, English music halls, circus clown antics, Chautauqua, and humorist monologues, such as those delivered by Mark Twain in his 1866 touring show Our Fellow Savages of the Sandwich Islands.

Charles Farrar Browne (April 26, 1834 – March 6, 1867), better known by his nom de plume, Artemus Ward, is considered by comedian historians America's first stand-up comedian.

The first documented use of stand-up in this context appeared in The Stage in 1911, describing Nellie Perrier delivering "stand-up comic ditties in a chic and charming manner". However, this referred to a performance of comedy songs rather than stand-up comedy in its modern form.

The term appeared again in the "Stage Gossip" column of the Yorkshire Evening Post on November 10, 1917. The article discussed the career of a comedian Finlay Dunn, stating that Dunn was "what he calls a stand-up comedian'" during the latter part of the 19th century. However, the term may have been used retrospectively.

== Genres ==
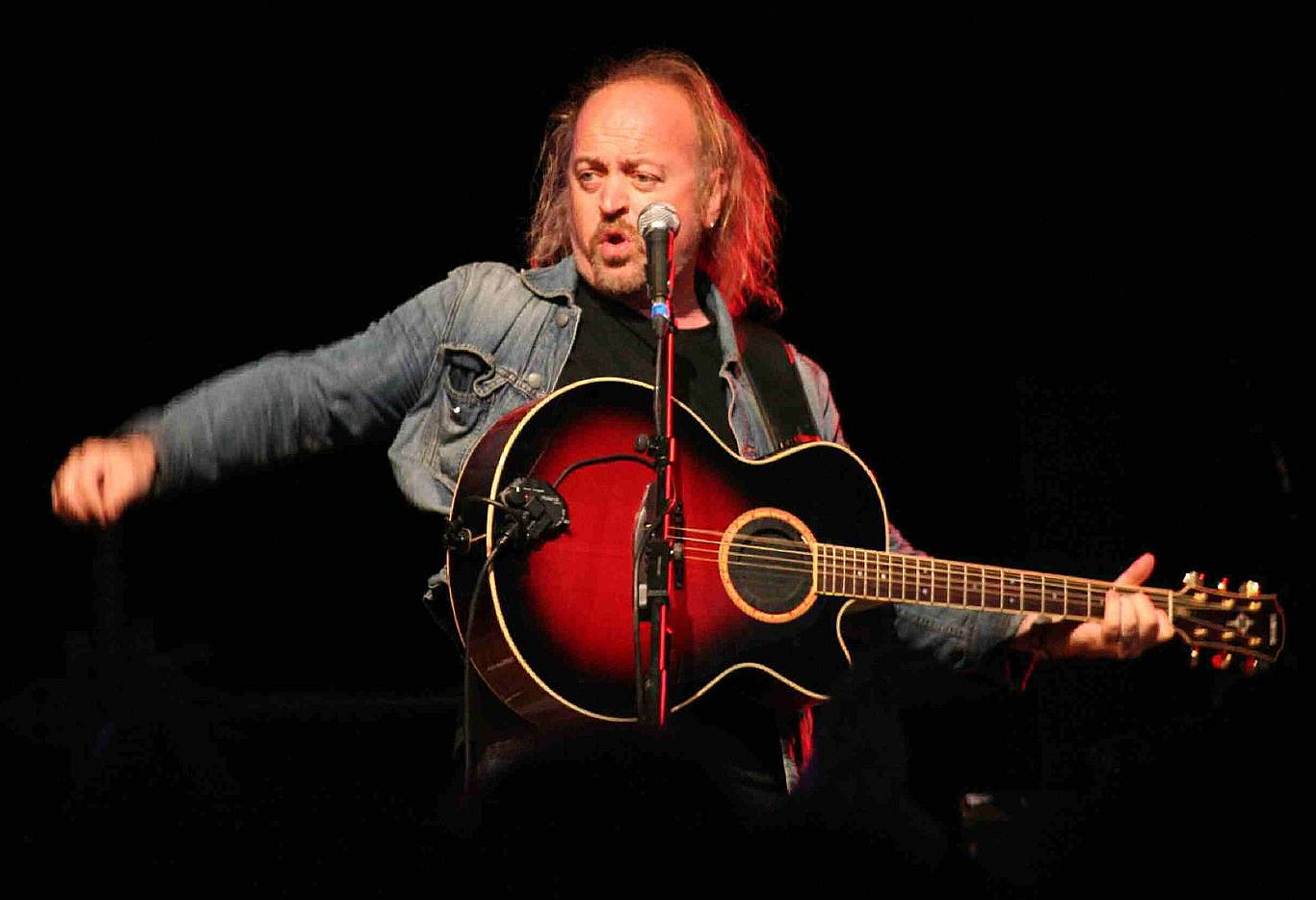
Bill Bailey performing in 2007

Stand-up has multiple genres and styles with their formats. Common ones include:

- Alternative comedy: Intended to counter the established approach of set up/punchline in mainstream comedy.
- Anecdotal comedy: Storytelling using exaggeration and humor.
- Character: A fictional persona created by the performer.
- Deadpan: The deliberate display of emotional neutrality or no emotion, commonly as a form of comedic delivery to contrast with the ridiculousness or absurdity of the subject matter. This is also called dry humor, or dry-wit humor.
- Impressionist: Imitating notable figures.
- Insult: Consists mainly of offensive insults, usually directed at the audience or other performers.
- Musical: Humorous songs or musical parodies, sometimes without lyrics.
- Observational: Conversation on the absurdities of everyday life.
- Satire: Ridicule of people, institutions, or ideas through jokes.
- Topical: Framed around a specific topic related to current events or dealing with issues that are important or popular at the current time.
- Wordplay comedy: Tends to involve the use of tactics like puns, double entendres and rhymes to entertain audiences. Thus, delivery tends to be filled with many one-liners.
- Self-Deprecating comedy: In this genre, comedians make jokes at their own expense, often poking fun at their own flaws, insecurities, or embarrassing experiences. The humor comes from vulnerability and relatability, which can make the comedian more likable. (see: Self-deprecation)

== Stand up performances ==
=== Opener, feature, and headliner ===
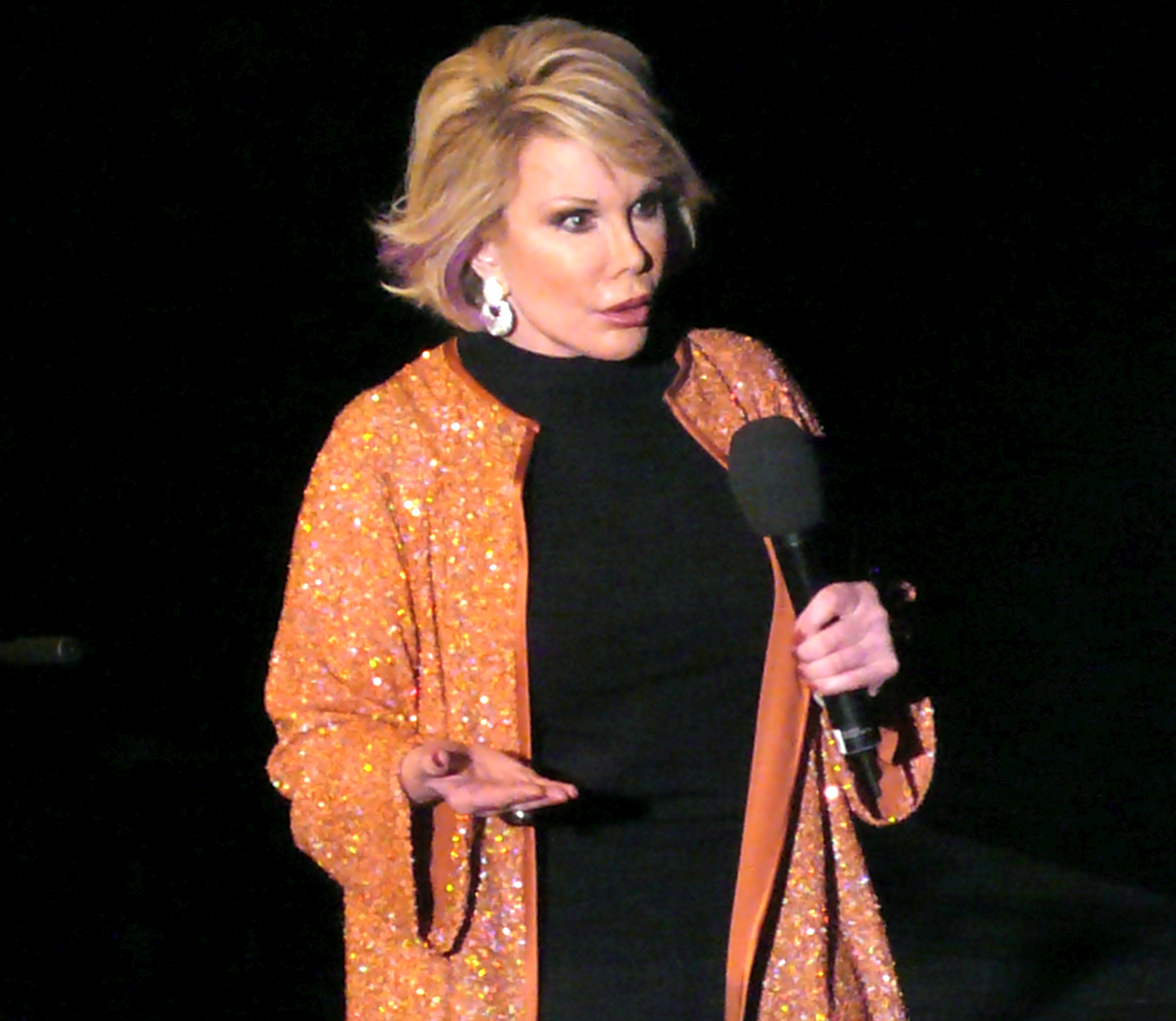
Joan Rivers performing in 2009

In a typical stand-up show, the host, compere, or emcee "warms up" the audience and introduces the other performers. This is followed by the opener, the feature, and then the headliner. The host may also act as the opener for smaller shows. Proven comics tend to earn regular bookings at clubs that are part of a chain and comedy venues. Jobbing stand-ups may perform sets at two or more venues on the same day.

=== Open mic ===
Clubs and small venues often run open mic events; these slots may be booked in advance or left for walk-ins. Comedians use open mics to work on material or to show off their skills to get an opener slot. Open mics are often bringer shows but not all bringer shows are open mics. "Bringer shows" are shows that require amateur performers to bring a specified number of paying guests with them to receive stage time.

=== Festivals ===
As well as being a mainstay of the comedy circuit, festivals often also showcase up-and-coming acts, with promoters and agents using the festivals to seek out new talent.

=== TV specials and albums ===
Experienced comics with a following may produce a television special or a comedy album. It may be recorded on tour or at a show advertised and performed specifically for the purpose. A TV special originally released on television, video on demand, or in film theatres may be re-released as an album on audio CD, LP record, or audio streaming. A "half-hour special" is typically between 20 and 35 minutes in runtime excluding commercial breaks and an "hour-long special" is typically between 40 and 65 minutes excluding commercial breaks.

== Comedy set ==
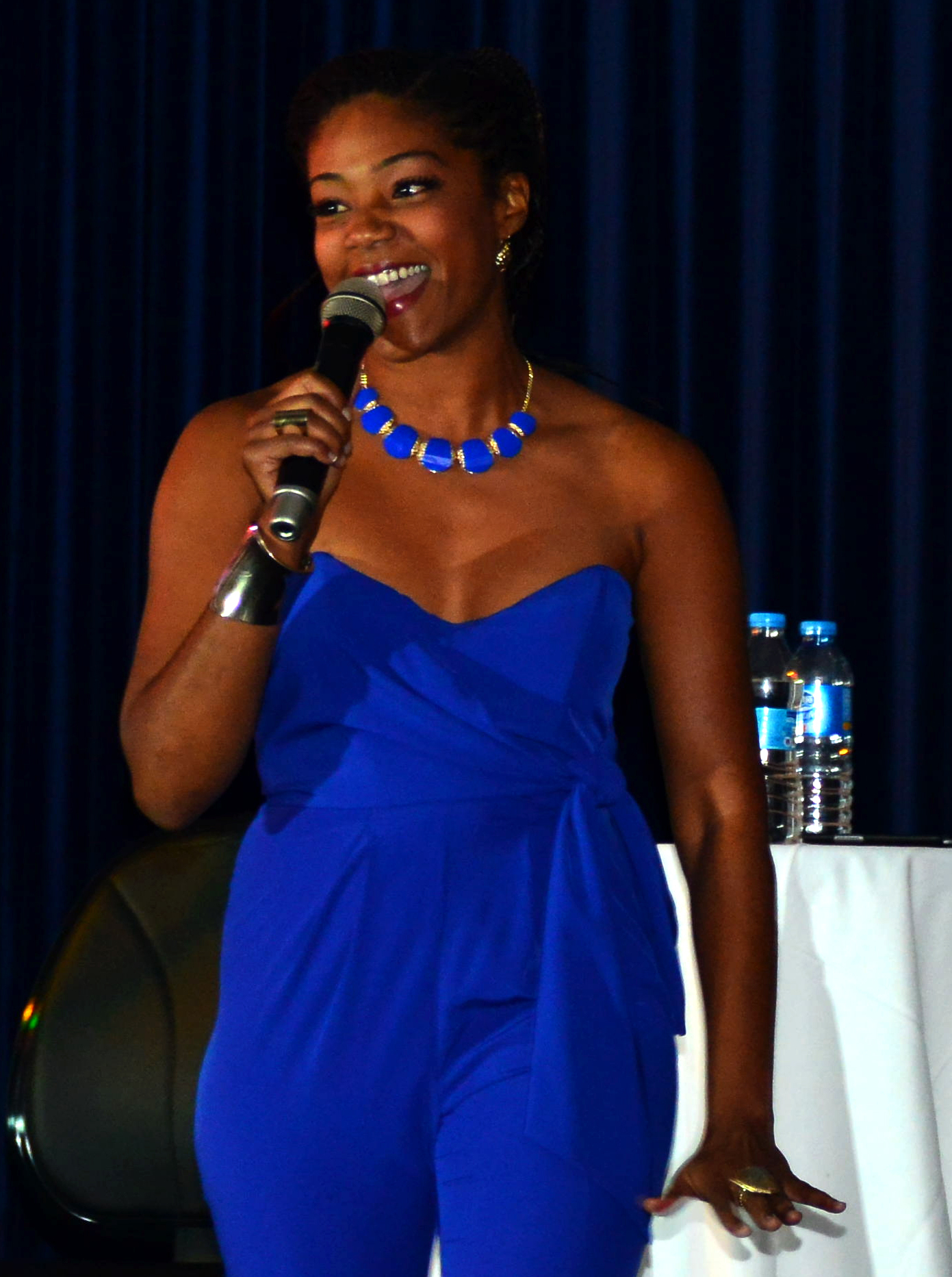
Tiffany Haddish performing in 2013

=== Routine ===
Stand-up comedians define their craft through the development of routines, which they construct and refine with jokes and interconnected "bits." These bits form an interwoven narrative, leading to the "closer," the final joke that ties the show's themes together for a satisfying conclusion.

Many but not all jokes are the juxtaposition of two incongruous things and are made up of the premise, set-up, and punchline, often adding a twist, topper, or tagline for an intensified or extra laugh. Delivery relies on the use of intonation, inflection, attitude, and timing as well as other stylistic devices, such as the rule of three, idioms, archetypes, or wordplay. Another popular joke structure is the paraprosdokian, a surprising punchline that changes the context or meaning of the setup.

To falsely frame their stories as true or to free themselves of responsibility for breaking social conventions, comedians can use the jester's privilege, which is the right to discuss and mock anything freely without being punished. Social commentators have referred to the concepts of "punching up" and "punching down" in attempting to describe who should be the "butt of the joke". This carries the assumption that, relative to the comedian's own socio-political identity, comedy should "punch up" at the rich and powerful without "punching down" at those who are marginalized and less fortunate. Many comedians have criticized the cultural rhetoric concerning "punching up" and "punching down", including Colin Quinn, who described the terms as a product of activism and "not created by humorous people."

=== Joke theft ===
Appropriation and plagiarism are considered "social crimes" by most stand-ups. There have been several high-profile accusations of joke theft, some ending in lawsuits for copyright infringement. Those accused will sometimes claim cryptomnesia or parallel thinking, but it is difficult to successfully sue for joke theft regardless due to the idea–expression distinction.

== Audiences ==
Damon Wayans performing in 2007

According to Anna Spagnolli, stand-up comedy audiences "are both 'co-constructors of the situation' and 'co-responsible for it'".

In stand-up comedy, an unspoken contract with the audience allows for the exploration of unexpected, controversial, or scandalous subjects. The reception of a joke, whether met with laughter or disapproval, hinges on the audience's understanding of the premise and appreciation of the punchline. A seasoned comic is able to instantly react to the audience's reaction and use it to further the narrative.

Stand-up comedy, distinct from traditional performing arts, features a lone comedian directly engaging the audience. Success hinges on creating spontaneity, fostering intimacy, and deterring heckling.

Part of the appeal of stand-up is in appreciation of the skill of the performer, as studies have shown that many people find the idea of standing on stage daunting; research on the subject has consistently found that the fear of public speaking is more intense than the fear of dying.

The audience is integral to live comedy, both as a foil to the comedian and as a contributing factor to the overall experience. The use of canned laughter in television comedy reveals this, with shows often seeming "dry" or dull without it. Shows may be filmed in front of a live audience for the same reason.

An audience delegates the success of a joke with their laughter. If the audience is not laughing, the joke is not working.

== Terms ==
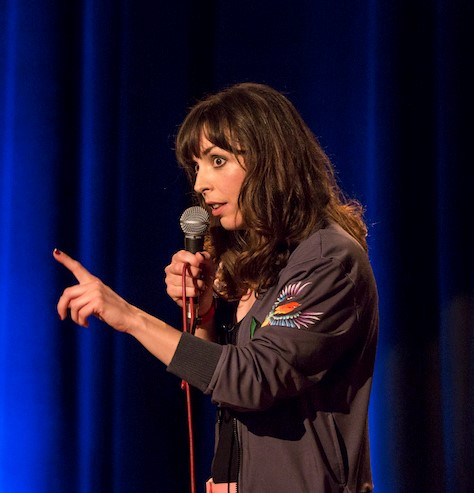
Bridget Christie performing in 2016

Beat
1. A section of material (see "bit" below).
2. To take a pause for some comedic effect.
Bit
1. A section of material, or a part of a section depending on context.
2. An entire self-contained comedic piece with its own purpose.
Bombing, Dying
Failing to get laughs.
Callback
A reference to a joke earlier in the set.
Chewing the scenery
Being overly theatrical or "trying too hard" to get a laugh, especially when failing.
Chi-chi room
The ritzy room of a nightclub or a comedy club with niche performances.
Clapter
When the audience cheers or applauds an opinion that they agree with, but which is not funny enough for them to laugh at. Coined by Seth Meyers.
Corpsing or breaking
When the comedian laughs unintentionally during a portion of the show in which they are supposed to keep a straight face.
Crowd work
Talking directly with audience members through prewritten bits, improvisation or both.
Hack
A clichéd or unskilled comic.
Killing, Crushing, Destroying
When a stand-up does well, they are killing. Same with Crushing and Destroying.
Mugging
Pulling silly faces to elicit a cheap laugh, often relying on exaggerated expressions and physical gestures. This comedic technique aims to generate amusement through visual absurdity and can be employed by performers to enhance the comedic impact of their delivery.
Punter
A member of the audience. Primarily a British term.
The room
The space where the performance takes place. Stand-ups can "read the room" to interpret signs from the audience or "work the room" by interacting with the audience directly.
Tight five
A five-minute routine that is well-rehearsed and consists of a comedian's best material that reliably gets laughs. It is often used for auditions and is a stepping stone to getting a paid spot.
Warm up
To warm up a "cold" audience during the opening act before the main show. Often used at the filming of television comedies in front of studio audiences.
Work out
The process in which brand new jokes are introduced and polished over time.

== Records ==
In 2015, Jessica Delfino broke the record for most comedy sets performed in one night by a female comedian.

Phyllis Diller holds the Guinness World Record for most laughs per minute, with 12.

Taylor Goodwin holds the Guinness World Record for most jokes told in an hour with 550.

Lee Evans sold £7 million worth of tickets for his 2011 tour in a day, the biggest first-day sale of a British comedy tour.

== See also ==
- Comedy
- List of stand-up circuits
- Women in comedy
- Theories of humor
- Macchietta, 19th-century Italian comedy
- Rakugo, Japanese one-man comedy
- Manzai, Japanese double act comedy
- Owarai, Japanese stand-up comedy
- Xiangsheng, Chinese stand-up comedy
