= The Roast of Tom Brady =

Television special

- Genre: Roast, comedy
- Directed by: Beth McCarthy-Miller

Production
- Executive producers: Tom Brady; Kevin Hart; Casey Patterson; Jeff Ross
- Running time: 3 hours

Original release
- Network: Netflix
- Release: May 5, 2024

The Roast of Tom Brady (occasionally stylized as The Greatest Roast of All Time: Tom Brady) is a celebrity roast special that aired on the streaming service platform Netflix. Former American football quarterback Tom Brady of the New England Patriots and the Tampa Bay Buccaneers served as the night's roastee with many celebrities in attendance, in addition to comedians, former teammates, and former Patriots head coach Bill Belichick. The show was hosted by Kevin Hart and "roastmaster general" Jeff Ross with an introduction from Rich Eisen. It aired live on Netflix as part of the Netflix Is a Joke Fest comedy festival in Los Angeles, California on May 5, 2024.

== Summary ==
The roast included jokes surrounding Brady's divorce from Gisele Bündchen, Spygate, Deflategate, trainer Alex Guerrero, O. J. Simpson, Bill Belichick's job status, New England Patriots owner Robert Kraft, cryptocurrency, and Brady losing to Eli Manning in the Super Bowl twice in 2008 and 2012. During the special, Kim Kardashian was booed by the crowd while toasting to Brady. There was a joke made by Ross referencing Robert Kraft's 2019 soliciting prostitution charges, which Brady objected to by getting up and warning Ross "don't say that shit again." Numerous references were also made to Aaron Hernandez, a former teammate of Brady's found guilty of murder who later took his own life while serving time in prison; and to Brady's previous relationship with actress Bridget Moynahan who got pregnant with their child just before their relationship ended in 2006.

== Participants ==
=== Comedians ===
- Kevin Hart
- Nikki Glaser
- Tony Hinchcliffe
- Sam Jay
- Jeff Ross
- Tom Segura
- Andrew Schulz

=== Athletes ===
- Tom Brady
- Danny Amendola
- Drew Bledsoe
- Julian Edelman
- Rob Gronkowski
- Rodney Harrison
- Randy Moss
- Matt Light
- Peyton Manning
- Willie McGinest
- Nate Solder

=== Surprise guests ===
- Ben Affleck
- Bill Belichick
- Robert Kraft
- Will Ferrell as Ron Burgundy
- Kim Kardashian
- Peyton Manning
- Bert Kreischer

=== In the audience ===
Numerous celebrities attended the event including:

- Dane Cook
- Jim Gaffigan
- Shane Gillis
- Chelsea Handler
- Todd Glass
- Richard Kind
- Charles Woodson
- Amanda Kloots
- Jimmy Carr
- Joel McHale
- Sean O'Malley
- Guillermo Rodriguez
- Dana White
- Jim Harbaugh
- Yvonne Orji
- Max Holloway
- Sal Iacono
- Snoop Dogg
- Seth Green
- Galen Gering
- Mina Kimes
- Hasan Minhaj
- Gary Dell'Abate
- Hannah Berner

== Production ==
Airing on Netflix, the roast was executive produced by Brady, Hart, Ross, and Casey Patterson, and was directed by Beth McCarthy-Miller. Live and unedited, it was promoted as "The GROAT" by Netflix.

== Reception ==
The roast was viewed two million times on its debut night. It broke into the top 10 most-watched shows of the week in early May 2024.

Gisele Bündchen, Brady's ex-wife, was reportedly "deeply disappointed" by the roast's "irresponsible" jokes.

Moynahan later posted on her Instagram account a day after the roast quoted:

Loyal people take shit more personal because they never would've did that shit to you

which she captioned "So true."

Brady himself commented on the roast, saying that while he enjoyed the jokes, he would never do it again due to the effect it had on his children:

I liked when the jokes were about me. I thought they were so fun. I didn’t like the way they affected my kids...It’s the hardest part about…like the bittersweet aspect of when you do something that you think is one way and then all of a sudden you realize I wouldn’t do that again because of the way that it affected actually the people that I care about the most in the world. It makes you in some ways a better parent going through it.
