= Punching Henry =

- Theatrical release poster
- Directed by: Gregori Viens
- Written by: Gregori Viens; Henry Phillips
- Produced by: Jim Hart; Arun Kumar; David Permut; Henry Phillips; Matt Ratner; Rick Rosenthal; Gregori Viens
- Starring: Henry Phillips; Tig Notaro; Jim Jefferies; Doug Stanhope; Sarah Silverman; J. K. Simmons
- Cinematography: Bryce Fortner
- Edited by: Michael R. Miller; Gregori Viens
- Production companies: Permut Presentations; Kandoo Films; Lola's Productions; Tilted Windmill Productions; Whitewater Films
- Distributed by: Well Go USA Entertainment
- Release dates: March 13, 2016 (SXSW); February 24, 2017 (United States)
- Running time: 95 minutes
- Country: United States
- Language: English

Punching Henry is a 2016 American comedy film directed by Gregori Viens and written by Gregori Viens and Henry Phillips. It is a sequel to the 2009 film Punching the Clown. The film stars Henry Phillips, Tig Notaro, Jim Jefferies, Doug Stanhope, Sarah Silverman and J. K. Simmons. The film was released on February 24, 2017, by Well Go USA Entertainment.

== Plot ==
Henry Phillips (Phillips, in a semi-fictional version of himself) is trying to make it big as a comedian. He is lured to Los Angeles by a producer (Simmons) to join a reality show, where he finds himself the butt of jokes rather than telling them.

== Cast ==
- Henry Phillips as himself
- Tig Notaro as Jillian
- Jim Jefferies as Charlie
- Doug Stanhope as Cab Dispatcher
- Sarah Silverman as Sharon Levine
- J. K. Simmons as Jay Warren
- Mark Cohen as Stupid Joe
- Ellen Ratner as Ellen Pinksy
- Mike Judge as Ed
- Stephanie Allynne as Zoe
- Clifton Collins Jr. as Dramatic Actor
- Michaela Watkins as Mara
- Derek Waters as Dave the Producer
- Wayne Federman as Carl Rohmer
- Ashley Johnson as Danielle
- Al Madrigal as Officer Delgado
- Myq Kaplan as Zack
- Matt Kirshen as Matt
- Ginger Gonzaga as Erica
- Amy Hill as Adjudicator
- Adam Nee as Funny Guitar Boy
- Nikki Glaser as Claire the Bartender
- Angela Trimbur as Sascha
- Brendon Walsh as Jon
- Greg Warren as Kalamazoo MC
- Peter White as Phil

== Release ==
The film premiered at South by Southwest on March 13, 2016. The film was released on February 24, 2017, by Well Go USA Entertainment.
