= Nikki Glaser =

American comedian (born 1984)

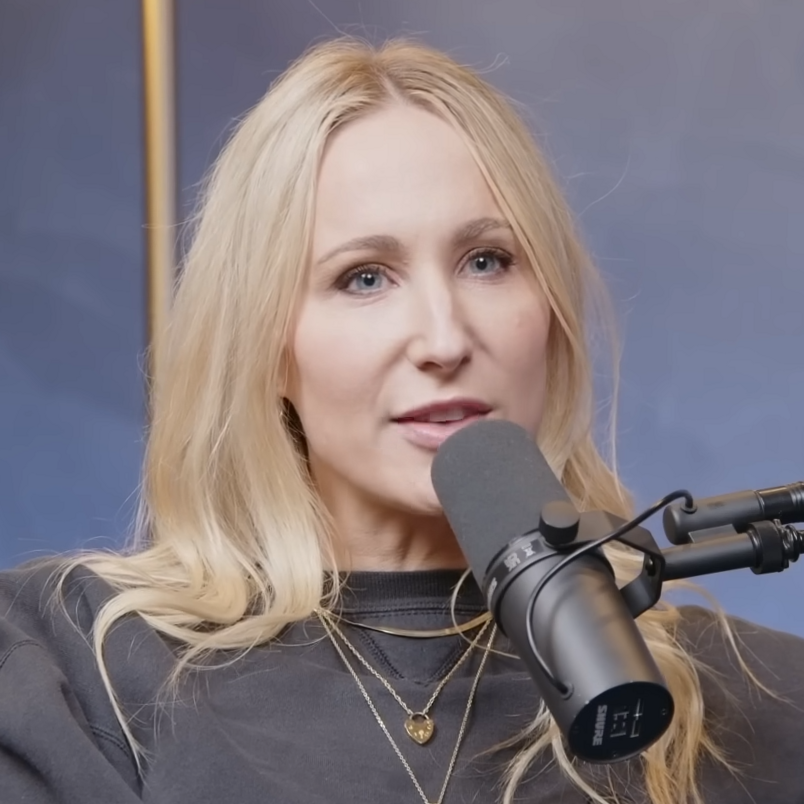
- Glaser in 2022
- Born: June 1, 1984 (age 42); Cincinnati, Ohio, U.S.
- Education: University of Kansas (BA)
- Partner: Chris Convy

Comedy career
- Years active: 2002–present
- Medium: Stand-up; television; film; podcast
- Genres: Observational comedy; blue comedy; cringe comedy; insult comedy; shock humor; satire
- Subjects: Interpersonal relationships; sex; everyday life; self-deprecation; current events; pop culture
- Website: nikkiglaser.com

Nicole Rene Glaser (/ˈɡleɪzər/; born June 1, 1984) is an American stand-up comedian and actress. She has had five television stand-up specials, hosted numerous award shows, and performed at numerous televised roasts, gaining significant popularity for her set on The Roast of Tom Brady. Previously, she hosted the television talk show Not Safe with Nikki Glaser, which premiered on Comedy Central in 2016. She starred in the 2022 reality show Welcome Home Nikki Glaser? on E! She hosted the reality TV dating shows Blind Date (2019) on Bravo and FBoy Island (2021–2023) on HBO Max and The CW and its spinoff Lovers and Liars on The CW. She also hosted the 2025 and 2026 Golden Globe Awards, which made her the first solo female host in Golden Globes history.

She has acted in the Amy Schumer comedy films Trainwreck (2015) and I Feel Pretty (2018) and has appeared on shows such as Inside Amy Schumer and A.P. Bio. She has competed in competition shows such as Dancing with the Stars (2018) and The Masked Singer (2022). She has also participated in the roasts of Rob Lowe (2016), Bruce Willis (2018), Alec Baldwin (2019), and the aforementioned roast of Tom Brady (2024). She has received nominations at the Critics' Choice Television Awards, Golden Globes, Grammy Awards, and Primetime Emmy Awards. She was included in the annual Time 100 list of the most influential people in the world in 2026.

== Early life and education ==
Glaser was born in Cincinnati, Ohio, the daughter of Julie E. (née Burke) and Edward J. Glaser. She has one sibling, a younger sister, Lauren. She was raised as Catholic and has Irish and German ancestry. Glaser spent most of her childhood living in the St. Louis suburb of Kirkwood, Missouri. She graduated from Kirkwood High School and briefly attended the University of Colorado Boulder before transferring to, and graduating from, the University of Kansas with a degree in English literature.

== Career ==
=== Stand-up comedy ===
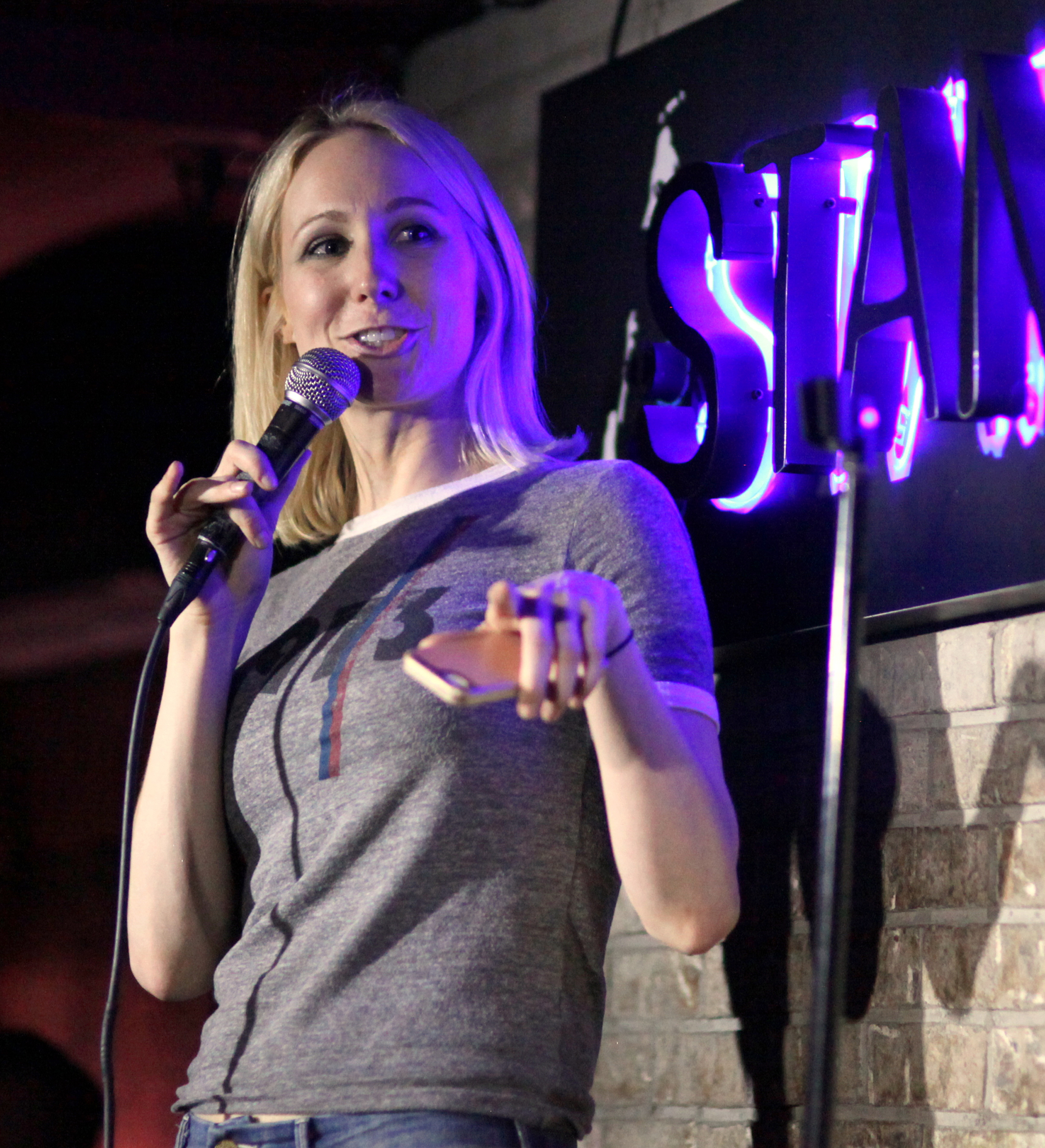
Glaser performing in 2016

Glaser started performing stand-up at age 18. Her first jokes were written in college. She recalled in an interview: "I remember it. I was a freshman in college and everyone in my dorm took over the cafeteria as like a study hall. I went in there and instead of studying I just looked at them, judged them and tried to think, 'What would Sarah Silverman say about these people?' I didn't know how to write jokes — I just knew the stand-ups I knew. I wrote from the perspective of my favorite stand-ups because I didn't know what my perspective was yet."

Glaser performed stand-up on The Tonight Show with Jay Leno, Conan, and two seasons of the reality series Last Comic Standing. Her first feature stand-up special, Perfect, aired on Comedy Central on April 9, 2016. Her second special, Bangin', premiered on Netflix on October 1, 2019. In 2024, she performed at The Roast of Tom Brady which aired live on Netflix.

Since 2022, St. Louis has celebrated "Nikki Glaser Day" each year. For "Nikki Glaser Day" on September 1, 2025, Glaser was honored with a St. Louis Cardinals bobblehead at Busch Stadium.

=== Podcast and radio ===
From 2011 to 2014, Glaser hosted a podcast with comedian Sara Schaefer called You Had to Be There. In July 2013, Glaser performed on the radio show The Debaters, debating the 'Early to Bed' adage. In March 2015, Glaser appeared on Giant Bomb's life-advice podcast, Danswers, talking about subjects such as her experience with co-host Dan Ryckert at college.

Glaser co-hosted the podcast We Know Nothing with comedian Phil Hanley and roommate/musician Anya Marina. We Know Nothing is a humorous relationship-based podcast that takes calls from listeners and attempts to give them love advice. From January to October 2016, she hosted the companion podcast to her Comedy Central show Not Safe with Dan St. Germain and Brian Frange. Each episode, they discussed sex and relationship issues as well as apples. Beginning in 2018, Glaser hosted multiple shows on Sirius XM channel 38 and on the pop music channel 314. In February 2018, Glaser began hosting You Up? With Nikki Glaser, aired on SiriusXM's Comedy Central Radio. The show was dropped by Sirius XM on May 7, 2020, and continued as a podcast until its final episode on October 2, 2020.

Throughout 2018 and 2019 Glaser appeared on the Howard Stern channels on Sirius XM, including the roast of Ronnie the Limo driver and as a guest on the wrap-up show. On September 24, 2019, she was the feature guest with Howard Stern for a full-length interview. Glaser appeared on The Joe Rogan Experience on October 3, 2018; October 3, 2019; and August 20, 2020.

The Nikki Glaser Podcast was hosted by Glaser, featured theme music performed by Anya Marina and was co-hosted by fellow stand-up comedian Andrew Collin until Collin left the show in fall 2022. He was replaced by comedian Brian Frange. The first episode released on March 22, 2021. The final episode of The Nikki Glaser Podcast posted on March 12, 2025.

=== Instagram ===
Glaser has developed a substantial following on Instagram, making her the 26th most followed comedienne on the platform in 2022. Glaser regards maintaining a social media presence to be demanding work for comedians, describing it as "a television show that never ends."

=== Film and television ===
Glaser played a small role in Henry Phillips's 2009 film Punching the Clown. She appeared as herself in Jordan Brady's 2010 documentary I Am Comic and its 2014 sequel, I Am Road Comic. On January 29, 2013, Nikki & Sara Live, a weekly television series hosted by Glaser and Schaefer, premiered on MTV. The show was canceled on October 29, 2013, after two seasons. On April 19, 2013, Glaser appeared in the pilot episode of Those Who Can't, a television series originally created by Amazon Studios. Glaser's character was replaced by Maria Thayer in 2015 when the series was picked up by TruTV.

Glaser appeared on MTV shows such as Money from Strangers, Awkward. After Show. You're Welcome., and Failosophy. Glaser had a role in the Judd Apatow-directed film Trainwreck (2015) and I Feel Pretty (2018). On June 2, 2015, Comedy Central approved a sex-themed talk show hosted by Glaser, titled Not Safe with Nikki Glaser. The show premiered on February 9, 2016. The show was picked up by 4Music in the United Kingdom. The show was cancelled in November 2016. On September 5, 2016, Glaser appeared on the Comedy Central Roast of Rob Lowe as a Roaster. She appeared on the Comedy Central Roast of Bruce Willis on July 28, 2018.

On September 12, 2018, Glaser was announced as one of the celebrities competing on season 27 of Dancing with the Stars. Her professional partner was Gleb Savchenko. They were the first couple eliminated from the competition on September 25. On February 6, 2019, Glaser appeared in the third episode of the third season of the celebrity rap-battle competition show Drop the Mic. She competed against fellow comedian Brad Williams, winning the battle. In November 2019, the dating show Blind Date was revived by Bravo, with Glaser as the new host.

On July 30, 2020, Glaser appeared as a panelist on To Tell the Truth along with co-panelists Joel McHale, Oliver Hudson, and Vivica A. Fox. This was one of her eleven appearances on the show from 2017 through 2021. Glaser is the host of The CW comedic dating reality television series FBOY Island and Lovers and Liars. The former first aired on HBO Max on July 29, 2021. Glaser's life was featured in the E! reality series Welcome Home Nikki Glaser?, which first aired May 1, 2022. Glaser appeared as herself in the 7th season of the Netflix reality series Selling Sunset. Glaser competed in season eight of The Masked Singer as "Snowstorm". After besting Chris Jericho as "Bride" and Adam Carolla as "Avocado" on "Comedy Roast Night" and Linda Blair as "Scarecrow" and Ray Parker Jr. as "Sir Bug a Boo" on "Fright Night", she was eliminated during the semifinals, where she finished in third place.

In July 2023, Glaser appeared on Celebrity Family Feud with her family. They competed against Bebe Rexha and her family. On January 3, 2024, Glaser appeared with her dad E.J. on the first episode of We Are Family, the game show hosted by Anthony Anderson. In May 2024, she appeared on Netflix's The Roast of Tom Brady. Since October 2024, Glaser has also appeared in the first season of Are You Smarter than a Celebrity? hosted by Travis Kelce.

Glaser hosted the 82nd Golden Globe Awards on CBS on January 5, 2025. She hosted the 2026 Golden Globes on January 11, delivering jokes about Bari Weiss' editorialization at CBS News, the age of Leonardo DiCaprio's girlfriends, and the Epstein files. Rolling Stone called Glazer's 2026 Golden Globes monologue a "master class in awards show monologues".

== Personal life ==
Glaser is in a relationship with producer Chris Convy. As of 2022, she lives in the Central West End neighborhood of St. Louis near her parents.

She has abstained from alcohol since 2011, and also stopped smoking. She credits the writing of Allen Carr in her recovery. Glaser has also divulged that she battled an eating disorder earlier in her life and sought help through a recovery program.

Glaser is a longtime animal-rights activist and has been a vegan since 2016. Starting in October 2023, she attended 22 Taylor Swift concerts during the Eras Tour.

== Comedy tours ==
=== Tours ===
Year	Title
2020–21	Bang It Out
2021–22	One Night with Nikki Glaser
2023–24	The Good Girl Tour
2024–25	Alive and Unwell
2026–27	The Stunning Tour

== Filmography ==
=== Film ===
Film credits
Year	Title	Role	Notes
2009	Punching the Clown	Olympia	
2010	I Am Comic	Herself	Documentary film
2015	Trainwreck	Lisa	
2016	Punching Henry	Claire the Bartender	
2018	I Feel Pretty	Woman at Lily Leclaire HQ	
2021	Hysterical	Herself	Documentary film
2026	The Angry Birds Movie 3	(voice)	In production
2026	Steps	Priscilla (voice)	In production
2027	The Fifth Wheel		Filming

=== Television ===
Television credits
Year	Title	Role	Notes
2013	Nikki & Sara Live	Herself (host)	24 episodes; also co-creator, writer, and executive producer
2013	The Half Hour	Herself	Season 2, Episode 2: Stand-up comedy set
2013–15	Inside Amy Schumer	Various	5 episodes
2016	Not Safe with Nikki Glaser	Herself (host)	20 episodes; also creator, writer, and executive producer
2016	Nikki Glaser's Perfect	Herself	Comedy Central stand-up special
2016	Comedy Central Roast of Rob Lowe	Herself (roaster)	Television special
2017	The Standups	Herself	Episode: "With Nikki Glaser"
2017	Adam Ruins Everything	Sallie Mae	Episode: "Adam Ruins College"
2018	A.P. Bio	Chloe from Baltimore	Episode: "Dating Toledoans"
2018	Alone Together	Annette	Episode: "Property Management"
2018	Comedy Central Roast of Bruce Willis	Herself (roaster)	Television special
2018	Dancing with the Stars	Herself/Contestant	Season 27; eliminated first
2019	Historical Roasts	Kurt Cobain	Episode: "Freddie Mercury"
2019	Nikki Glaser: Bangin'	Herself	Netflix stand-up special
2019	Comedy Central Roast of Alec Baldwin	Herself (roaster)	Television special
2019	Blind Date	Host	55 episodes
2020	Crank Yankers	Herself (voice)	Episode: "Nikki Glaser, Jimmy Kimmel & Tracy Morgan"
2021	MTV Movie & TV Awards: Unscripted	Host	Television special
2021–23	FBOY Island	Herself (host)	30 episodes; also executive producer
2022	Robot Chicken	Cheetah (voice)	Episode: "May Cause Indecision...Or Not"
2022	Nikki Glaser: Good Clean Filth	Herself	HBO stand-up special
2022	Welcome Home Nikki Glaser?	Herself	8 episodes; also creator and executive producer
2022	Close Enough	Ranessa (voice)	2 episodes
2022	RuPaul's Drag Race All Stars	Herself/Guest Judge	Episode: "Draguation Speeches"
2024	The Roast of Tom Brady	Herself	Netflix special
2024	Nikki Glaser: Someday You'll Die	Herself	HBO stand-up special
2024	Lovers and Liars	Herself (host)	10 episodes; also executive producer
2025	82nd Golden Globe Awards	Herself (host)	Television special
2025	Saturday Night Live	Herself (host)	Episode: "Nikki Glaser/Sombr"
2026	83rd Golden Globe Awards	Herself (host)	Television special
2026	Nikki Glaser: Good Girl	Herself	Hulu stand-up special

=== Music videos ===
Music video credits
Year	Title	Band	Notes
2021	"Pillar of Salt"	Matt Pond PA	
2022	"Monotony"	The Natural Lines	

=== Video games ===
Video game credits
Year	Title	Role	Notes
2025	Call of Duty: Black Ops 7	New Replacer	

== Discography ==
All credits adapted from Apple Music and Spotify.

=== Albums ===
- Perfect (2016)
- Someday You’ll Die (2024)

=== Singles ===
==== As lead artist ====
Year	Title	Album	Writer(s)	Producer(s)
2024	"Someday You’ll Die"	Someday You’ll Die	Nikki Glaser, Dan Monahan, Tim Convy	Dan Monahan
2026	"Good Girl"	Good Girl	Nikki Glaser, Dan Monahan, Tim Convy	Dan Monahan

=== Compilations ===
- Women Who Kill (2013)
- Just for Laughs: Funny AF, Vol. 1 (2019)
- Just for Laughs - Premium, Vol. 37 (2019)
- First Nations Comedy Experience Vol 5 (2021)
- Adam Ray's Hot Mic: Dr Phil LIVE! Vol. 1 (2024)
- Adam Ray's Hot Mic: Dr Phil LIVE! Vol. 2 (2025)

== Awards and nominations ==
Association	Year	Category	Work	Result	Ref.
Critics' Choice Television Awards	2025	Best Comedy Special	Nikki Glaser: Someday You'll Die	Nominated	
Golden Globes	2025	Best Stand-Up Comedy Performance	Nikki Glaser: Someday You'll Die	Nominated	
Grammy Awards	2025	Best Comedy Album	Nikki Glaser: Someday You'll Die	Nominated	
Grammy Awards	2027	Best Comedy Album	Nikki Glaser: Good Girl	Pending	
Primetime Emmy Awards	2024	Outstanding Variety Special (Pre-Recorded)	Nikki Glaser: Someday You'll Die	Nominated	
Primetime Emmy Awards	2026	Outstanding Variety Special (Live)	83rd Annual Golden Globes	Nominated	
Primetime Emmy Awards	2026	Outstanding Variety Special (Pre-Recorded)	Nikki Glaser: Good Girl	Nominated	
Primetime Emmy Awards	2026	Outstanding Writing for a Variety Special	Nikki Glaser: Good Girl	Nominated	
Writers Guild of America Awards	2025	Best Comedy/Variety – Specials	Nikki Glaser: Someday You'll Die	Won	
