= Mike MacRae =

American actor (born 1977)

- Born: July 29, 1977 (age 49); St. Louis, Missouri, U.S.
- Education: Rice University
- Occupations: Actor; stand-up comedian; producer; director; writer
- Years active: 1999–present

Comedy career
- Medium: Stand-up; film; television
- Genres: Observational comedy; sketch comedy; improvisational comedy
- Website: mikemacrae.com

Mike MacRae (born July 29, 1977) is an American actor, stand-up comedian, producer, director and writer.

== Early life and career ==
A native of St. Louis, Missouri, MacRae moved to Houston, Texas, in 1995 where he graduated from Rice University in 1999 and started performing in The Laff Stop. He appeared on television for the first time in 2001 with Comedy Central's Premium Blend and is a regular on The Bob & Tom Show. In 2007, he released his first comedy album Hovercraft.

As an actor, he has appeared in feature films and television series including Balls Out, Bird-Scorpion, I Love You, Will Smith, Keith & Heath, Punching the Clown, Rooster Teeth Shorts, Taste in Powder, The Man Who Never Cried and 2009: Lost Memories. He has done voice work for ADV Films and dubbed characters in many English language versions of anime. In addition, he has also voiced the Disney/Pixar character Buzz Lightyear in Toy Story video games.

MacRae made his first appearance on the Late Show with David Letterman on May 2, 2007. He was a cast member on Frank TV, and in 2009 was part of the Just for Laughs festival in Montreal, Quebec. MacRae also contributes voice impersonations to The Jimmy Dore Show on KPFK in Los Angeles. In the fall of 2012, he began appearing on The Howard Stern Show on Sirius XM, doing his impersonation of Republican presidential candidate Mitt Romney. Since 2011, he has taken his multi-voice talent to the Jimmy Dore Show where he is a regular, impersonating dozens of political figures.

== Filmography ==
=== Film ===
- Balls Out - Doctor
- Bird-Scorpion - Cop
- I Love You, Will Smith - Randal
- Keith & Heath - Unseen Narrator (voice)
- Punching the Clown - Car Heckler
- Taste in Powder - Cochise
- The Man Who Never Cried - Narrator (voice)
- Washingtonia - Unknown role (voice)
- 2009: Lost Memories - JBI 2nd-in-Command (voice)
- Facing Nolan - Narrator (voice)

=== Television ===
- Colorful - Anchorman
- Frank TV - Various
- Late Show with David Letterman - Himself/Guest
- Let's Be Real - Charlie Rose (voice)
- Premium Blend - Himself/Guest
- Sketchy - Unknown role
- Knight Rider / Trust Doesn't Rust S1E9 - Tony

=== Anime ===
- Appleseed Ex Machina - Manuel Aeacus
- Cromartie High School - Pootan
- Diamond Daydreams - Takeda
- Excel Saga - That Man
- Full Metal Panic! - Gauron
- Kaleido Star: New Wings - Leon Oswald
- Magical Shopping Arcade Abenobashi - Taro Hayashi, Taro Imamiya
- Martian Successor Nadesico: The Prince of Darkness - Hokushin
- Mezzo - Omabari
- Neo Ranga - Haseoka
- Pani Poni Dash! - Alien Captain (Ep. 1–14)
- Papuwa - Harlem
- Peacemaker Kurogane - Toshizo Hijikata
- Saint Seiya - Phoenix Ikki, Black Phoenix
- Saiyuki - Dokugakuji (Episode 21–50, after Jason Miesse)
- Samurai Gun - Rekkai
- Steel Angel Kurumi - Dr. Ayanokouji
- Super GALS! - Gunjo
- The Super Milk-chan Show - The President
- Yumeria - Kurofuku

=== Animation ===
- Lady Death: The Motion Picture as Asmodeus, Large Torture Troll
- Mike Tyson Mysteries - Charlie Rose
- Our Cartoon President - Mitt Romney, Joe Manchin
- Viva Piñata - Prewitt Profitamole

=== Video games ===
- Disney Infinity - Buzz Lightyear
- Disney Infinity 2.0 - Buzz Lightyear
- Disney Infinity 3.0 - Buzz Lightyear
- Kinect Disneyland Adventures - Buzz Lightyear
- Kinect Rush: A Disney–Pixar Adventure - Buzz Lightyear
- Toy Story 3: The Video Game - Buzz Lightyear
- Kingdom Hearts III - Buzz Lightyear
- Where the Water Tastes Like Wine - August
- Wizard101 - Old One/Dasein, Bartleby

=== Web ===
- Rooster Teeth Shorts - Mr. Sprinklestein

=== Radio ===
- The Bob & Tom Show - Himself/Guest
- The Howard Stern Show - Himself

== Impressions on Frank TV ==
- Jeff Bridges
- Bill O'Reilly
- Dan Aykroyd
- Dirk Nowitzki
- Edward Asner (as Lou Grant from The Mary Tyler Moore Show)
- Alec Guinness (as Obi-Wan Kenobi)
- Harrison Ford (as himself and as Indiana Jones)
- Ian McKellen
- Mel Gibson
- Peter O'Toole
- Rip Torn
- Russell Crowe
- Tom Brokaw
- Ozzy Osbourne
- Vince Vaughn

== Discography ==
- Hovercraft (2007)

== Crew work ==
- Mitt Romney's Brain Gets Hacked - Director, producer, writer
- Taste in Powder - Director, producer, writer
- The Jimmy Dore Show (YouTube series) - Writer
