= Where My Dogs At? =

2006 American animated television series

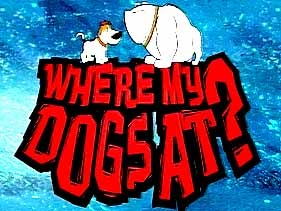
- Genre: Adult animation Comedy; Sitcom
- Created by: Aaron Matthew Lee; Jeff Ross
- Opening theme: "Where My Dogs At?", composed by John Warrin
- Ending theme: "Where My Dogs At?" (instrumental)
- Country of origin: United States
- Original language: English
- No. of seasons: 1
- No. of episodes: 8

Production
- Executive producer: Michael Bloom
- Camera setup: Single-camera
- Running time: 22 minutes
- Production companies: Enough With The Bread Already Productions; MTV Animation; 6 Point Harness

Original release
- Network: MTV2
- Release: June 10 – July 29, 2006

Where My Dogs At? is an American adult animated sitcom created by Aaron Matthew Lee and Jeff Ross for MTV2. The series premiered as part of its Sic'emation lineup on June 10, 2006, and ended its run on July 29, 2006. It centers around a pair of unlikely, different dogs: a young beagle and a lazy bulldog named Buddy and Woof. The two dogs try to survive in the streets of Hollywood and avoid conflict with the Dog Catcher. The animation for the show was produced at 6 Point Harness. 8 episodes were produced.

== Plot ==
The show lampoons celebrity stardom in various ways; for example, many of the characters based on real celebrities have other voice actors impersonating their voices (such as Steve-O from Jackass and Wildboyz, who appeared in the third episode).

Set in the streets of Hollywood, the series features the main adventures of a rare but smart, brown and white beagle named Buddy who separated from his 10-year-old owner Jeffy in Elizabeth, New Jersey, and his lovable best friend Woof, the lazy and tough bulldog (to whom Buddy refers as obsessed), as he runs away from his owner. The dogs are avoided by the Dog Catcher.

== Cast ==
- Jeff Ross as Buddy, a heroic, kind-hearted, shy, smart and free-for-all beagle who has, most likely, white and brown mixed-breed fur and belongs to Woof.
- Tracy Morgan as Woof, an angry and rude, but lazy, smart and tough, gray-colored bulldog who is Buddy's lovable best friend and sidekick.
- John DiMaggio as Dog Catcher, Additional Voices
- Greg Eagles as Additional Voices
- Dean Edwards as Additional Voices
- Aaron Matthew Lee as Additional Voices
- Jeff Richards as Rexia, Additional Voices
- Lauren Tom as Additional Voices

== Episodes ==
No.	Title	Original release date
1	"Ugly Beagle Meets Pig Dog"	June 10, 2006
Buddy and Woof get a celebrity treatment from Lindsay Lohan and are adopted by Angelina Jolie and Brad Pitt, but canines are having trouble with Maddox. Other celebrities mocked include Mischa Barton, Mary-Kate Olsen, Britney Spears, and Kevin Federline.
2	"Buddy and Woof Do the Movie Awards"	June 17, 2006
Buddy and Woof break out of the Hollywood Dog Pound and try to get on TV at the MTV Movie Awards (which is hosted by Jimmy Fallon after Dave Chappelle got injured in the intro), since Buddy's owner watches every year and will hopefully see him. Unfortunately for Buddy and Woof, the Dog Catcher is attending the MTV Movie Awards. Celebrities mocked include Paris Hilton, Nicole Richie, 50 Cent, Jimmy Fallon, Andy Dick, Jack Black, and Jessica Simpson. Other celebrities mocked include Eminem, Owen Wilson, and Vince Vaughn. Other celebrities mocked with non-speaking roles include Tony Yayo, Lloyd Banks and Young Buck.
3	"Being with the Browns"	June 24, 2006
Buddy and Woof go to the Hollywood Celebrity Dog Park, where they end up being taken home by Bobby Brown and Whitney Houston. Other celebrities mocked include Dave Chappelle, Courtney Love, Simon Cowell, and Steve-O.
4	"Woofie Loves Snoop"	July 1, 2006
Buddy and Woof get adopted by Snoop Dogg. Buddy's excited that Snoop's upcoming tour with Eminem will go to Jersey, only to find Snoop retiring from rap. Buddy and Woof then conspire to get Snoop back in the rap game by creating a feud with Snoop's next door neighbor, Hilary Duff. Other celebrities mocked include Kathy Griffin, Eminem, Clay Aiken, Good Charlotte, Aaron Carter, Jesse McCartney, and Ryan Cabrera.
5	"The War On Tara"	July 8, 2006
After Tara Reid announces the official end of her career, Buddy and Woof end up at a rehab facility with her. That's where they meet Mariah Carey, Russell Crowe and Janet Jackson, as well as Andy Dick, who helps the dogs escape.
6	"Jacko Comes Backo"	July 15, 2006
The dogs want to move into Michael Jackson's abandoned Neverland Ranch, but first they must fight off PETA and Jennifer Lopez. Other celebrities mocked include Christina Aguilera, Donald Trump, Cameron Diaz, and Pamela Anderson.
7	"The One About Jilted Jen"	July 22, 2006
Vince Vaughn gives the dogs to girlfriend Jennifer Aniston to keep her company while he's off making a movie. She and Buddy go on the computer and learn about MePlace.com. Other celebrities mocked include Andy Milonakis and Courtney Love. Chef from South Park also makes an appearance.
8	"The Last Ashton Hero"	July 29, 2006
Buddy is kidnapped by Tom Cruise, who plans to sacrifice him in a Scientology ritual. A group of Kabbalists rescues Buddy, and Ashton Kutcher and Demi Moore take the dogs home. The dogs end up doing stunt work for Bruce Willis, but Cruise comes back for Buddy, starting a clash between the Scientologists and Kabbalists. Other celebrities mocked include Katie Holmes, Beck, Kirstie Alley, Jason Lee, and Jenna Elfman.

== Reception ==
Leonard Pitts of the Miami Herald said that "MTV misses mark with offensive 'woofie' cartoon."

== Controversy ==
MTV and the show received angry responses from the African-American community for "depicting black women squatting on all fours tethered to leashes and defecating on the floor" in an episode depicting Snoop Dogg ("Woofie Loves Snoop").
