= Comedy Central Roast =

Television series

- Genre: Roast, comedy

Production
- Running time: 90 minutes

Original release
- Network: Comedy Central
- Release: August 10, 2003 – September 15, 2019

Comedy Central Roast is a series of celebrity roast specials that aired on the American television channel Comedy Central between 2003 and 2019. The first official Comedy Central Roast premiered on August 10, 2003. As of 2019, seventeen roasts have aired. Targets of roasts have included musicians, actors and comedians. Since 2010, Comedy Central affiliates outside the United States have occasionally produced their own roasts; twelve such roasts have aired so far, in five countries.

== History ==
Between 1998 and 2002, the American television channel Comedy Central produced and televised the annual roasts of the New York Friars Club, which the club hosted since 1950.

- 1998 – Drew Carey, roastmaster Ryan Stiles
- 1999 – Jerry Stiller, roastmaster Jason Alexander
- 2000 – Rob Reiner, roastmaster Michael McKean
- 2001 – Hugh Hefner, roastmaster Jimmy Kimmel
- 2002 – Chevy Chase, roastmaster Paul Shaffer

After the original five-year agreement expired, the network began producing its own roasts in the same spirit. Comedy Central employed the same model, with eight to ten people were invited to each roast one another before finally roasting the titular subject of the roast. Concurrently, the New York Friars Club continued their own Roast.

The first, featuring roastee Denis Leary (and produced by Leary's production company, Apostle), aired on August 10, 2003. His roast was the most watched program in the channel's history, excluding episodes of South Park.

Roastees often identify topics that are off limits. Pamela Anderson, for example, prohibited jokes about her Hepatitis C infection. Joan Rivers disallowed jokes about her daughter Melissa, William Shatner asked that the death of his wife not be mentioned, and Donald Trump prohibited jokes about him not being as wealthy as he claims he is. Others, like David Hasselhoff, have imposed no limits on the topics. Although Charlie Sheen initially agreed to no restrictions on his roast, he later said during an interview with Jay Leno that he requested jokes about his mother be edited out of the broadcast.

The final televised ceremony is a reduced and edited version of what occurred the day of the roast. Often, jokes are removed due to pacing, audience response, and taste. For example, during Sheen's roast, Steve-O made the joke "The last time this many nobodies were at a roast, at least Great White was playing". This was a reference to The Station nightclub fire in West Warwick, Rhode Island, that killed 100 people on February 20, 2003. It was removed from broadcast on Steve-O's request. During Denis Leary's roast, Lenny Clarke, a friend of Leary's, said there was a carton of cigarettes backstage from Bill Hicks with the message, "Wish I had gotten these to you sooner." This joke was cut from the final broadcast. During Roseanne Barr's roast, Jeff Ross compared fellow roaster Seth Green to James Holmes, the mass murderer responsible for the 2012 Aurora, Colorado, shooting. The joke was not in the broadcast program. During the roast of Justin Bieber, multiple jokes about the passing of Paul Walker, co-star and close friend of fellow roaster Ludacris, were cut from the official broadcast.

== Roasts ==
Roastee	Roast master(s)	Original release date	US viewers (millions)
Denis Leary	Jeff Garlin	August 10, 2003	3.2
Roasters: Mario Cantone, Lenny Clarke, Dane Cook, Nick DiPaolo, Ed Lover with Doctor Dré, Adam Ferrara, Colin Quinn, Don Gavin, and Gina Gershon, and a surprise guest appearance by Jim Breuer, with pre-taped appearances by Michael J. Fox, Peter Gallagher, Gilbert Gottfried as Denis' Irish Wolfhound, Joe Mantegna, Conan O'Brien, Rene Russo, and Christopher Walken. Notable audience members: Gilbert Gottfried, Patrice O'Neal, Susie Essman, Kiefer Sutherland, Vincent Pastore, and Elizabeth Hurley.
Jeff Foxworthy	Bill Engvall, Ron White, & Larry the Cable Guy	March 20, 2005	6.2
Roasters: Steve Bridges as US President George W. Bush, Nick DiPaolo, Christian Finnegan, Greg Giraldo, Gilbert Gottfried as Jeff's cow, Heidi Klum, Lisa Lampanelli, Denis Leary, Jay Mohr, Patrice O'Neal, Colin Quinn, Anna Nicole Smith, and G. E. Smith. A special, pre-taped, guest appearance was made by Dr. Phil. The hip-hop group B.A.M.A. performed their cover of "Sweet Home Alabama".
Pamela Anderson	Jimmy Kimmel	August 14, 2005	4.3
Roasters: Courtney Love, Adam Carolla, Bea Arthur, Nick DiPaolo, Greg Giraldo, Elon Gold, Eddie Griffin, Lady Bunny, Lisa Lampanelli, Tommy Lee, Jeff Ross, Sarah Silverman, and Andy Dick, with pre-taped appearances by David Spade and Hugh Hefner. Notable audience members: Anna Nicole Smith, Doug Benson, and Wayne Federman. Dennis Rodman was amongst the crowd on the stage. This roast featured a large amount of jokes and satire regarding sex directed from roasters toward fellow roasters, complete with Andy Dick appearing as Pamela's plastic surgeon and groping her breasts as part of his skit. Many of the jokes were also directed at Courtney Love for appearing to be inebriated (but claiming to have been sober for a year), Bea Arthur's masculinity, Andy Dick's ambiguous sexuality and Lisa Lampanelli's full figured body as well as her attraction towards black people.
William Shatner	Jason Alexander	August 20, 2006	3.6
Roasters: Andy Dick (as the "love child" of James T. Kirk and Spock), Farrah Fawcett, Greg Giraldo, Lisa Lampanelli, Artie Lange, Nichelle Nichols, Patton Oswalt, Kevin Pollak, Jeff Ross, George Takei, Betty White, and Fred Willard performing the roasting duties. Special, pre-taped, guest appearances were made by Leonard Nimoy, Sandra Bullock, Ben Stiller, Sarah Silverman, Jimmy Kimmel, and Clint Howard. Notable audience members: Andy Daly, Adrian Zmed, David Carradine, Roger Corman, Brent Spiner, Jeri Ryan, René Auberjonois, Rosalind Chao, Mark Valley, Carrie Fisher, Scott Hamilton, Brad Paisley, Reno 911! stars Cedric Yarbrough and Niecy Nash, and Brian Posehn. Executive Produced by Joel Gallen, with Aaron Matthew Lee serving as Head Writer. The Leonard Nimoy sequence which originally opened the broadcast on Comedy Central (Nimoy and Shatner were shown having an argument over the phone) was omitted from the DVD release, while many pre-taped sequences and jokes told during the roast itself were added back in after originally being cut. The tagline for this roast was "The Shat hits the fan." The Roast was nominated for a 2007 Primetime Emmy Award for Outstanding Variety Special. The background music for the montage of Shatner was "Everything I Do, I Do with William Shatner" by the Star Trek-influenced rock band, Warp 11. Women dressed as green Orion slave girls can be clearly seen tending bar.
Flavor Flav	Katt Williams	August 12, 2007	3.8
Roasters: Ice-T, Jimmy Kimmel, Snoop Dogg, Greg Giraldo, Patton Oswalt, Lisa Lampanelli, Jeff Ross, Carrot Top, Sommore, and Brigitte Nielsen. Notable audience members: Ron Jeremy, comedian Luenell, comedian Red Grant, comedian Godfrey, Scott Adsit from 30 Rock, Nicole "Coco" Austin, Kordell Stewart, Derek Parker, Moonlite BunnyRanch owner Dennis Hof, Wayne Federman, Alexis Arquette, and Chyna. The roast was produced by Joel Gallen.
Bob Saget	John Stamos	August 17, 2008	2.2
Roasters: Susie Essman, Greg Giraldo, Brian Posehn, Jim Norton, Jeff Garlin as fictional Full House executive producer Saul Schwartz (though he broke character at the end), Gilbert Gottfried, Jon Lovitz, Norm Macdonald, Cloris Leachman, and Jeff Ross. Pre-taped appearances were delivered by Sarah Silverman, Lewis Black, and Don Rickles. Notable audience members: Full House co-stars Lori Loughlin, Jodie Sweetin, and Dave Coulier along with Growing Pains star Alan Thicke, Rex Lee of Entourage, Quantum Leap and Star Trek: Enterprise star Scott Bakula, Executive Jordan Levin, actors Carlos Jacott and Jonathan Silverman, Wayne Federman, and Alonzo Bodden. Norm Macdonald's set was notable in that it avoided racy content and featured intentionally cheesy and antiquated jokes. He later revealed that the material was taken from a book given to him by his father that contains jokes meant to be told at retirement parties circa 1950, and that when the roast's showrunner asked him to be "shocking," he decided to go in the opposite direction of the usual roast humor. Artie Lange was scheduled but did not show at the roast because he had entered a rehabilitation center. It was later revealed that Saget was highly upset by the jokes aimed at Candace Cameron and the Olsen twins. The DVD was released on December 30, 2008. The DVD version did not include the Full House theme song as Saget comes out at the end to roast everyone who roasted him. It was replaced by instrumental music. The TV version has the theme song only.
Larry the Cable Guy	Lisa Lampanelli	March 16, 2009	4.1
Roasters: Nick DiPaolo, Jeff Foxworthy, Greg Giraldo, Toby Keith, Jeff Ross, Reno Collier, Maureen McCormick, Warren Sapp, and Gary Busey. Bill Engvall made a pre-taped appearance. Notable audience members: Doug Benson, Larry's wife Cara Whitney, Gary Valentine, and John Melendez. Originally taped on March 1, 2009. This marks the first time that a previous roastmaster has become a roastee, and the first time that a roast was broadcast in 16:9 high-definition.
Joan Rivers	Kathy Griffin	August 9, 2009	2.8
Roasters: Carl Reiner, Gilbert Gottfried, Mario Cantone, Whitney Cummings, Tom Arnold, Brad Garrett, Robin Quivers, Greg Giraldo and Jeff Ross. Donald Trump made a pre-taped appearance and Melissa Rivers came from the audience to roast her mother. Notable audience members: Melissa Rivers, Michael C. Hall, Jennifer Carpenter, Alan Thicke, T.J. Miller, Chris Pratt and Anna Faris. Originally taped on July 26, 2009. It was released on the Comedy Central Emmy Consideration DVD sent only to members of the Consideration program. At the time aged 76, Joan Rivers is the oldest honoree to date.
David Hasselhoff	Seth MacFarlane	August 15, 2010	3.5
Roasters: Jeff Ross, Pamela Anderson, Lisa Lampanelli, Hulk Hogan, Jerry Springer, Whitney Cummings, Greg Giraldo, George Hamilton, and Gilbert Gottfried, Sharon Osbourne and Piers Morgan made pre-taped appearances, and William Daniels reprised his role as the voice of KITT. Notable audience members: John Slattery, Craig Robinson, Christina Milian, Hasselhoff's two daughters, Hayley and Taylor, Hulk Hogan's son, Nick, and fellow Baywatch alumni Alexandra Paul, Nicole Eggert, Gena Lee Nolin, Traci Bingham, Angelica Bridges and Jeremy Jackson. To close the show, Hasselhoff sang "This Is the Moment" from the musical Jekyll & Hyde, which he formerly starred in. The DVD was released in January 2011. This is also the final roast in which Greg Giraldo participated. Giraldo died on September 29, 2010.
Donald Trump	Seth MacFarlane	March 15, 2011	3.5
Roasters: Whitney Cummings, Anthony Jeselnik, Larry King, Lisa Lampanelli, Marlee Matlin (interpreted by interpreter Jack Jason & a surprise appearance by Gilbert Gottfried), Jeff Ross, Snoop Dogg, and Mike "The Situation" Sorrentino. Notable audience members: Melania Trump, Ivanka Trump, Ice-T, Russell Simmons, Chrissy Teigen, John Legend, Lindsay Lohan, Alexis Arquette, Joel Madden and David Foster. Originally taped on March 9, 2011. The roast consisted of jokes toward Trump's hairstyle, his show The Apprentice, and his family. Jokes were also made about Jeselnik's fame (or lack thereof), Matlin's deafness, King's age, and Jersey Shore. Several roasters paid respect to Greg Giraldo, a Comedy Central Roast regular, who died on September 29, 2010. The roast was dedicated in his memory. Mike "The Situation" Sorrentino's performance was widely panned by critics and viewers alike; as a result, Comedy Central pulled several of his jokes from the television airing of the roast. This was also the first time someone served as roastmaster more than once, as Seth MacFarlane also roasted David Hasselhoff.
Charlie Sheen	Seth MacFarlane	September 19, 2011	6.4
Roasters: Anthony Jeselnik, Jon Lovitz, Patrice O'Neal, Jeff Ross, Amy Schumer, William Shatner, Steve-O, Mike Tyson, and Kate Walsh. Notable audience members: Brooke Mueller, Aaron Paul, Slash, Maria Menounos, Corbin Bernsen, Duane Chapman, Kevin Cronin of REO Speedwagon, Michael Boatman, Kristin Cavallari, Ciara Hanna, Wayne Federman, Richard Kind, Ron Jeremy, and Patrick Warburton. The roast was taped in Los Angeles on September 10, 2011, and was broadcast nine days later, exactly one hour after the premiere of Ashton Kutcher's first episode on Two and a Half Men where he replaced Sheen. Slash made an appearance playing his guitar during Sheen's entrance. Harvey Levin from TMZ.com was scheduled to appear but ended up not doing so. During an interview on The View, Sheen's ex-wife Denise Richards stated that she had not been invited to appear and, while she thought roasting her ex-husband could be humorous and that he would be able to take it, she feared it would have a negative impact on their daughters. Sheen's famous family members, Emilio Estevez and Martin Sheen, were unable to attend as they were promoting their film The Way, although Martin Sheen appeared in a commercial for the roast, spoofing his film Apocalypse Now. A montage of Charlie Sheen's film and television work was featured, although, for legal reasons, clips of his tenure on Two and a Half Men were not used. In reference to how his Two and a Half Men character Charlie Harper was killed off the series (hit by a train), Sheen arrived on stage riding on a replica locomotive. In the United Kingdom and Turkey, on the network which Two and a Half Men airs, the roast aired directly after Kutcher's first Two and a Half Men episode. This was O'Neal's final television appearance before his death on November 29, 2011. With 6.4 million viewers in its original debut, this roast was the highest rated Comedy Central Roast to date.
Roseanne Barr	Jane Lynch	August 12, 2012	2.6
Roasters: Ellen Barkin, Wayne Brady, Carrie Fisher, Gilbert Gottfried, Seth Green, Anthony Jeselnik, Jeff Ross, Katey Sagal, and Amy Schumer, and also featured a surprise appearance by Barr's ex-husband Tom Arnold. Notable audience members: Sarah Chalke, Natasha Leggero, Blake Anderson, Wayne Federman, Alicia Goranson, Michael Fishman, Frances Fisher, Tyler, the Creator, Traci Lords, Chris Colfer, Caroline Rhea and Fred Willard. The roast was taped in Los Angeles on August 4, 2012. Sharon Stone had been announced as one of the roasters, but dropped out for unknown reasons prior to the event. The final surprise of the night was Barr's choice to close out the show by legitimately singing the last two lines of "The Star-Spangled Banner", in an effort to finally redeem herself for her infamous and controversial rendition of the American anthem at a nationally broadcast baseball game in 1990. This is Gilbert Gottfried's last roast appearance, as he died on April 12, 2022.
James Franco	Seth Rogen	September 2, 2013	3.1
Roasters: Aziz Ansari, Bill Hader, Jonah Hill, Nick Kroll, Natasha Leggero, Jeff Ross, Andy Samberg, and Sarah Silverman. Notable audience members: DeAndre Jordan, Blake Anderson, Jillian Bell, Adam DeVine, Andy Dick, Chris Farren, Wayne Federman, Dave Franco, Jennie Garth, Brett Gelman, Eiza González, Anders Holm, Gabriel Iglesias, Kelley Jakle, Samm Levine, Maribeth Monroe, Matthew Morrison, Amy Poehler, Stephen Rannazzisi, June Diane Raphael, Retta, Horatio Sanz, Paul Scheer, and Kate Walsh. Bill Hader appeared on stage as President of Hollywood. The roast consisted of several jokes about Franco co-hosting the 2011 Oscars.
Justin Bieber	Kevin Hart	March 30, 2015	4.4
Roasters: Hannibal Buress, Pete Davidson, Chris D'Elia, Will Ferrell as Ron Burgundy, Natasha Leggero, Ludacris, Shaquille O'Neal, Jeff Ross, Snoop Dogg, and Martha Stewart. Notable audience members: Scooter Braun, Dave Chappelle, Tito Ortiz, John Legend, Chrissy Teigen, Kendall Jenner, Wayne Federman, Jack Gilinsky, Blake Anderson, Katharine McPhee, Kourtney Kardashian, Kate Walsh, Chris Paul, Trevor Noah, Sarah Tiana, Larissa Marolt, Carly Rae Jepsen, Jaden Smith, Gloria Allred and Kyle Kinane. In an appearance on The Ellen DeGeneres Show, Ellen DeGeneres revealed that she was approached by Braun, Bieber's manager, to participate in the roast, but refused because she did not want to be mean to Bieber. Jokes referencing the death of Ludacris' Fast & Furious co-star Paul Walker were cut out of the television broadcast. Additionally, a joke by Hannibal Buress which called the roast an "extremely transparent attempt to be more likable in the public eye" was cut. Being age 21 at the time of filming, Bieber is the youngest roastee to be roasted by Comedy Central to date.
Rob Lowe	David Spade	September 5, 2016	1.3 (CC) 2.3 (simulcast)
Roasters: Jimmy Carr, Ann Coulter, Pete Davidson, Nikki Glaser, Jewel, Ralph Macchio, Peyton Manning, Rob Riggle, Jeff Ross. Amy Poehler appeared in a pre-recorded segment. Notable audience members: Maria Shriver, Patrick Schwarzenegger, Nick Swardson, Fred Savage, Chad Lowe, Kate Walsh, Robbie Williams, Brandon Flowers, Marlee Matlin Originally taped on August 27, 2016. The Roast was simulcast on Spike and TV Land. Bo Derek was originally announced as a roaster, but was replaced by Jewel due to a scheduling conflict. A majority of the jokes referenced Rob Lowe's infamous sex tapes, and Jewel even sang a parody of her song "You Were Meant for Me" as a reference to it. According to Tony Hinchcliffe, who was assigned by Comedy Central to write the first draft of Ann Coulter's set, Coulter was unaware of the nature of roasts when she agreed to participate. Many of the other roasters harshly targeted Coulter. She was criticised for her strong conservative political views, called a "cunt" by Davidson, told to commit suicide by Carr, compared to members of the Ku Klux Klan, and even likened to Adolf Hitler. The crowd reacted to much of Coulter's set with indifference or booing. Coulter claims that her set "killed" live and that her apparent bombing in the aired version of the roast was the result of unflattering editing. Ross refuted Coulter's claim, stating "We edited it to make her look as best we could". Her set centered around a plug for her book In Trump We Trust, which was met with loud sustained booing from the audience.
Bruce Willis	Joseph Gordon-Levitt	July 29, 2018	1.76 (CC) 2.8 (simulcast)
Roasters: Cybill Shepherd, Edward Norton, Nikki Glaser, Lil Rel Howery, Dom Irrera, Kevin Pollak, Dennis Rodman, Martha Stewart and Jeff Ross. Demi Moore also made a surprise appearance to roast Willis, her ex-husband. Notable audience members: David Hasselhoff, Maggie Q, Seth Green, Brian Huskey, Mackenzie Davis, Emma Heming, Dulcé Sloan and Rumer Willis.
Alec Baldwin	Sean Hayes	September 15, 2019	2.4
Roasters: Robert De Niro, Blake Griffin, Caitlyn Jenner, Chris Redd, Jeff Ross, Ken Jeong, Nikki Glaser, Caroline Rhea, Adam Carolla. Ireland Baldwin spoke at the dais, referencing the pejorative voicemail he left her in 2007, as did a number of other roasters. Lady Gaga appeared in a pre-taped segment to promote Exploring the Arts. Triumph the Insult Comic Dog also appeared. Notable audience members: David Spade, Larry David, Dakota Johnson. Debra Messing was initially announced as a roaster, but pulled out due to a schedule conflict. Joel McHale also had been announced but dropped out. The roast was also meant to promote Exploring the Arts, a charity that Baldwin supported. Paul Anka, the lyricist of "My Way", appeared at the end to sing the song with Baldwin. This was notably the first roast since the Jeff Foxworthy roast where the roastee did not make any kind of grand entrance. Jeff Ross was an executive producer of this roast.

== Recurring roasters ==
The table below features any roasters who have appeared on multiple Comedy Central Roasts. As of the Alec Baldwin roast, the most frequent roaster has been Jeff Ross, who has appeared in all but the first two roasts, for a total of 15, and has yet to be a roastmaster. (Note: Ross hosted the roast of Gene Simmons, a third-season episode of Gene Simmons Family Jewels on A&E.) Greg Giraldo has the second-most appearances, with a total of eight roasts from 2005 until his death in 2010 (nine including the 2002 New York Friars Club roast of Chevy Chase). As of 2019, Seth MacFarlane is the most frequent roastmaster with three consecutive turns in the role.

Roaster	Roastee																
Roaster	Denis Leary (2003)	Jeff Foxworthy (2005)	Pamela Anderson (2005)	William Shatner (2006)	Flavor Flav (2007)	Bob Saget (2008)	Larry the Cable Guy (2009)	Joan Rivers (2009)	David Hasselhoff (2010)	Donald Trump (2011)	Charlie Sheen (2011)	Roseanne Barr (2012)	James Franco (2013)	Justin Bieber (2015)	Rob Lowe (2016)	Bruce Willis (2018)	Alec Baldwin (2019)
Pamela Anderson			O						Yes								
Tom Arnold								Yes				Maybe					
Mario Cantone	Yes							Yes									
Adam Carolla			Yes														Yes
Whitney Cummings								Yes	Yes	Yes							
Pete Davidson														Yes	Yes		
Andy Dick			Yes	Yes													
Nick DiPaolo	Yes	Yes	Yes				Yes										
Snoop Dogg					Yes					Yes				Yes			
Bill Engvall		RM					Yes										
Jeff Foxworthy		O					Yes										
Jeff Garlin	RM					Yes											
Greg Giraldo		Yes	Yes	Yes	Yes	Yes	Yes	Yes	Yes								
Nikki Glaser															Yes	Yes	Yes
Gilbert Gottfried	Yes	Yes				Yes		Yes	Yes	Maybe		Yes					
Anthony Jeselnik										Yes	Yes	Yes					
Jimmy Kimmel			RM	Yes	Yes												
Lisa Lampanelli		Yes	Yes	Yes	Yes		RM		Yes	Yes							
Larry the Cable Guy		RM					O										
Natasha Leggero													Yes	Yes			
Jon Lovitz						Yes					Yes						
Seth MacFarlane									RM	RM	RM						
Patrice O'Neal		Yes									Yes						
Patton Oswalt				Yes	Yes												
Kevin Pollak				Yes												Yes	
Colin Quinn	Yes	Yes															
Don Rickles						Yes		Yes									
Jeff Ross			Yes	Yes	Yes	Yes	Yes	Yes	Yes	Yes	Yes	Yes	Yes	Yes	Yes	Yes	Yes
Amy Schumer											Yes	Yes					
William Shatner				O							Yes						
Sarah Silverman			Yes	Yes		Yes							Yes				
David Spade			Yes												RM		
Martha Stewart														Yes		Yes	
Donald Trump								Yes		O							

Scheduled performer
Performer who made a surprise appearance
RM Indicates a roastmaster
O Indicates performer's own roast

== Venues ==
The following table features the venues where multiple Comedy Central Roasts were filmed. As of the Alec Baldwin roast, the Sony Pictures Studios in Culver City, California has hosted the most roasts, namely the roasts of Pamela Anderson, David Hasselhoff, Charlie Sheen, Justin Bieber, and Rob Lowe.

Roasts	City	Venue	Roastee(s)
5	Culver City	Sony Pictures Studios	Pamela Anderson, David Hasselhoff, Charlie Sheen, Justin Bieber, and Rob Lowe
3	New York City	Hammerstein Ballroom	Denis Leary, Jeff Foxworthy, and Donald Trump
2	Burbank	Warner Bros. Studios	Bob Saget and Larry the Cable Guy
2	Los Angeles	CBS Studio Center	William Shatner and Joan Rivers
2	Los Angeles	Hollywood Palladium	Roseanne Barr and Bruce Willis
1	Beverly Hills	Saban Theatre	Alec Baldwin
1	Culver City	Culver Studios	James Franco
1	Los Angeles	Old Warner Brothers Studio	Flavor Flav

== Cancelled roasts ==
In 2008, a roast for the musician Willie Nelson was planned to coincide with the release of his box set, One Hell of a Ride, but was ultimately cancelled, according to Jeff Ross.

A roast for the musician Kid Rock was announced in November 2010 and scheduled for January 2011, but was later replaced by the Donald Trump roast. Rock's roast was rescheduled for August 2011, but was replaced again, this time by Charlie Sheen's roast. Kid Rock agreed to doing the roast if it were filmed in his hometown of Detroit, Michigan, a condition that Comedy Central refused.

== International ==
The following roasts aired on international Comedy Central channels:

Country/Region (Channel)	Roastee	Roastmaster	Original air date	Ref.
Africa (Comedy Central Africa)	Steve Hofmeyr	Trevor Noah	September 24, 2012	
Africa (Comedy Central Africa)	Kenny Kunene	Jimmy Carr	April 28, 2014	
Africa (Comedy Central Africa)	Somizi Mhlongo	Gareth Cliff	May 7, 2018	
Africa (Comedy Central Africa)	AKA	Pearl Thusi	February 21, 2019	
Africa (Comedy Central Africa)	Khanyi Mbau	Mpho Popps	August 8, 2022	
Latin America (Comedy Central Latin America)	Héctor Suárez	Héctor Suárez Gomís	May 18, 2013	
Netherlands (Comedy Central Netherlands)	Gordon	Jörgen Raymann	December 20, 2016	
Netherlands (Comedy Central Netherlands)	Giel Beelen	Gijs Staverman	December 13, 2017	
Netherlands (Comedy Central Netherlands)	Johnny de Mol	Jeroom Snelders	December 18, 2018	
Netherlands (Comedy Central Netherlands)	Ali B	Sanne Wallis de Vries	December 17, 2019	
Netherlands (Comedy Central Netherlands)	Hans Klok	Henry van Loon	December 21, 2021	
Netherlands (Comedy Central Netherlands)	Famke Louise	Dolf Jansen	January 16, 2023	
New Zealand (Comedy Central New Zealand)	Mike King	Willy de Wit	December 15, 2010	
New Zealand (Comedy Central New Zealand)	Murray Mexted	—N/a	September 7, 2011	
Spain (Comedy Central Spain)	Santiago Segura	Alex O'Dogherty	May 14, 2014	
Spain (Comedy Central Spain)	El Gran Wyoming	Andreu Buenafuente	July 12, 2015	
Spain (Comedy Central Spain)	José Mota	Anabel Alonso	February 24, 2019	

== Awards and nominations ==
Year	Award	Category	Nominated work	Result	Ref
2007	Primetime Emmy Award	Outstanding Variety, Music, or Comedy Special	Comedy Central Roast of William Shatner	Nominated	

== Future ==
Comedy Central went from regularly producing 1 to 2 roasts per year to only producing one roast every 2 to 3 years. The last Comedy Central produced roast occurred in 2019. Since that time, there have been no plans by Comedy Central to bring back the roast format. Instead, Netflix has adopted the format as part of their Netflix Is a Joke Festival, and have hosted two live roasts, one of Tom Brady and one of Kevin Hart.

== See also ==
- The Dean Martin Celebrity Roast
- A Comedy Roast
- Historical Roasts, a spin-off series on Netflix
- Roast Battle
