= Pierce Wallace =

American actor and television personality

- Born: 1994 or 1995 (age 30–31); Valdosta, Georgia, US
- Education: University of Georgia
- Occupations: Sports fan; television personality; actor; playwright
- Known for: Georgia Joker; Reflections of a Tough Texan: The Legacy of Lyndon Johnson
- Notable credits: FBOY Island; Hemet, or the Landlady Don't Drink Tea
- Awards: 2013 ESPN Fan Hall of Fame

Pierce Wallace, also known as the Georgia Joker, is an American sports fan, television personality, actor, and playwright who was a contestant on season 3 of FBOY Island, appeared in the film Hemet, or the Landlady Don't Drink Tea (2023), wrote the one-man play Reflections of a Tough Texan (2025), and was inducted into ESPN's Fan Hall of Fame.

== Personal life ==
Wallace grew up in Valdosta, Georgia, as the son of Mike Wallace, a podiatrist, and a high school teacher, Carol Wallace. He is a fraternal triplet with brothers Austin and Doyle, and also has a sister, Madalyn.

Wallace grew up wanting to be an actor. His neighbor Sonny Shroyer was his inspiration. Wallace attended Valdosta High School where he played basketball. It wasn't until he took a literature class his junior year that he realized he had knack for acting. Wallace was assistant head coach for golf and was voted homecoming king in 2012. In 2013, he competed against 15 other students for lack of absences and tardiness, winning a Scion iQ through VHS and Wiregrass Georgia Technical College's Keys to the Future Program. Wallace graduated high school shortly after and signed an academic scholarship for the University of Georgia.

=== 2013–2018: Georgia Joker ===
During his first year of college at University of Georgia, Wallace wore Joker makeup for the Georgia Bulldogs' first game against South Carolina. It was inspired by Wallace's enthusiasm for the Batman franchise. ESPN tweeted about it and a video of Wallace in character was posted for the game against Louisiana State University. With more than 85,000 votes, he was one of three winners for ESPN's Fan Hall of Fame. In 2014, Wallace was inducted at ESPN headquarters in Bristol, Connecticut.

== Career ==
After moving to Los Angeles in 2018, Wallace became a yoga instructor and was cast in season 3 of FBOY Island. Abbie Smith at The Daily Beacon described him as the season's hippie. He was eliminated by Hali Okeowo in episode 5.

Wallace portrayed Howie Stumpp, a freethinking nature lover, in the 2023 comedy horror film Hemet, or the Landlady Don't Drink Tea. To prepare for the role, he documented the character's traits and fears in a diary, allowing him to perform authentically.

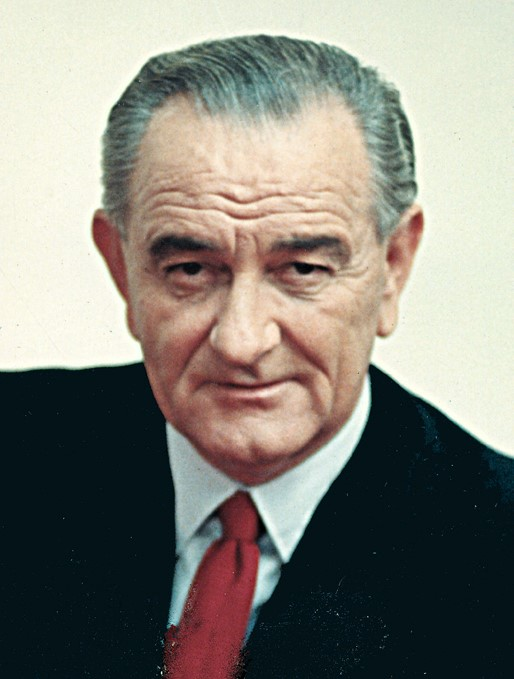
Wallace portrayed Lyndon B. Johnson at Santa Monica Playhouse

Wallace wrote, directed, produced and performed as Lyndon B. Johnson in a Shakespearean one-man play titled Reflections, which premiered at the Santa Monica Playhouse in 2025. He performed the play over 10 times to attendees such as Arnold Schwarzenegger and Casey Affleck. It was later retitled Reflections of a Tough Texan: The Legacy of Lyndon Johnson for a performance in Ketchum, Idaho. Wallace said he was inspired after learning about the Vietnam War while finishing school and studied the character through archive footage across several trips to the Lyndon Baines Johnson Library and Museum. He wanted to tell the story about Johnson because of their age difference and experiences in life, focusing on Johnson's time as president and his morals as a human being.

== Filmography ==
Year	Title	Role	Notes
2021	Wild West Chronicles	Ranch Hand	Episode: "Bass Reeves: Trailblazing Lawman"
2021	Angel Mountain	Ronald	Featuring Caroline Amiguet and Thom Michael Mulligan
2023	FBOY Island	Himself	5 episodes
2023	Hemet, or the Landlady Don't Drink Tea	Howie Stumpp	
