= Patriot Act: A Jeffrey Ross Home Movie =

- Directed by: Jeff Ross
- Written by: Jeff Ross
- Starring: Jeff Ross
- Release date: July 21, 2005
- Country: United States
- Language: English

Patriot Act: A Jeffrey Ross Home Movie is a 2005 documentary film written and directed by comedian Jeff Ross.

== Overview ==
The film covers a 2003 United Service Organizations (USO) comedy tour for American soldiers in Iraq, organized and headlined by Drew Carey and also featuring Ross, Blake Clark, Rocky LaPorte, Kyle Dunnigan and Kathy Kinney. The film shows the comedians performing for the troops, interacting with them, and observing elements of the ongoing Iraq War. Ross, who had never participated in a USO tour, states in the documentary that he was inspired by comedian Bob Hope, who performed frequently for U.S. troops throughout his life.

Patriot Act premiered at the Montreal Just for Laughs Festival on July 21, 2005, and has since been shown on Showtime.

== Awards ==
- Official Selection: 2006 South by Southwest Film Festival
