= Historical Roasts =

Comedy television series

- Genre: Comedy; history
- Directed by: Joel Gallen
- Presented by: Jeff Ross
- Country of origin: United States
- Original language: English
- No. of seasons: 1
- No. of episodes: 6

Production
- Executive producers: Michael D. Ratner; Eric D. Cohen; Scott H. Ratner; Jeff Ross; Amy Zvi
- Running time: 28–30 minutes
- Production companies: OBB Pictures; Enough with the Bread Already Productions; Thruline Entertainment

Original release
- Network: Netflix
- Release: May 27, 2019

Related
- Comedy Central Roast

Historical Roasts is an American comedy television series on Netflix. Based on the Los Angeles live comedy show of the same name, created by Eddie Furth, Ryan Pigg and Samee Junio, the series "roasts" historical figures including Abraham Lincoln, Martin Luther King Jr., and Cleopatra. The 6-episode first season was released on Netflix on May 27, 2019. It is hosted by Jeff Ross, a "recurring roaster" who has appeared frequently in stand-up specials and series on Comedy Central.

== Episodes ==
No.	Title	Original release date
1	"Abraham Lincoln"	May 27, 2019
A roast of Abraham Lincoln (Bob Saget), the 16th President of the United States. Guests include Mary Todd Lincoln (Natasha Leggero), Harriet Tubman (Yamaneika Saunders), John Wilkes Booth (John Stamos), and Frederick Douglass (Jerron Horton).
2	"Freddie Mercury"	May 27, 2019
A roast of Freddie Mercury (James Adomian), the frontman of Queen. Guests include David Bowie (Seth Green), Kurt Cobain (Nikki Glaser), Princess Diana (Fortune Feimster), and Mercury's longtime girlfriend Mary Austin (Charlotte McKinney).
3	"Anne Frank"	May 27, 2019
A roast of Anne Frank (Rachel Feinstein), Jewish diarist and author of The Diary of a Young Girl. Guests include Franklin D. Roosevelt (Jon Lovitz), Adolf Hitler (Gilbert Gottfried), Don Rickles (Mindy Rickles), and God (Fred Willard). Note: Gottfried reprises his role as Hitler from the 1992 American B horror comedy film Highway to Hell.
4	"Martin Luther King Jr."	May 27, 2019
A roast of Martin Luther King Jr. (Jerry Minor), leader of the Civil Rights Movement in the U.S. Guests include Barack Obama (Brandon T. Jackson), Nelson Mandela (Jaleel White), Rosa Parks (Sasheer Zamata), and Robert F. Kennedy (Neal Brennan).
5	"Cleopatra"	May 27, 2019
A roast of Cleopatra (Ayden Mayeri), Pharaoh in Ancient Egypt. Guests include Julius Caesar (Ryan Phillippe), Mark Antony (Ken Marino), Isis (Bridget Everett), and William Shakespeare (Rory Scovel).
6	"Muhammad Ali"	May 27, 2019
A roast of Muhammad Ali (Jaleel White), heavyweight boxer. Guests include Babe Ruth (John Gemberling), Bruce Lee (Leonardo Nam), Elvis Presley (Josh Homme), Angelo Dundee (John DiMaggio), and Joe Frazier (Jamar Malachi Neighbors).

== Production ==
On September 20, 2018, Deadline reported that Netflix had ordered six episodes of the series.

== Reception ==
Reception from critics has been mixed. For Paste, John-Michael Bond wrote "if you don't mind your comedy black, you'll find a lot to like in Historical Roasts' silly look at the past." Others, including the Anne Frank House in Amsterdam, have criticized the "Anne Frank" episode for jokes about concentration camps, and making light of Nazi-occupied Europe. Niv Hadas of Haaretz, an Israeli newspaper, defended the show from critics, calling the episode "compassionate, funny and historically accurate".
