= FBoy Island =

American dating reality television series

- Created by: Elan Gale
- Presented by: Nikki Glaser
- No. of seasons: 3
- No. of episodes: 30

Production
- Executive producers: Ben Bitonti; Sam Dean; Elan Gale; Nikki Glaser; Jason Goldberg
- Production locations: Cayman Islands; Cabo San Lucas; Malibu, California
- Production companies: STXalternative; TheYearOfElan Productions

Original release
- Network: HBO Max
- Release: July 29, 2021 – August 4, 2022
- Network: The CW
- Release: October 16 – December 8, 2023

Related
- Lovers and Liars

FBoy Island is an American dating reality television series which focuses on three women trying to identify the male contestants as either womanizers ("fboys") or seeking a serious relationship ("nice guys"). The series is hosted by Nikki Glaser and premiered on July 29, 2021, on HBO Max.

In August 2021, the series was renewed for a second season, which premiered on July 14, 2022. In December 2022, the series was canceled, with STXalternative planning to shop the series elsewhere. It was also removed from the streaming service. In March 2023, The CW picked up the show for a third season, along with its spinoff Lovers and Liars.

== Premise ==
Hosted by comedian Nikki Glaser, the show centers on three female contestants and 24 male counterparts. Of the men, 12 are self-professed nice guys, while the other half identify as fboys, the former being interested in forming a relationship and splitting the $100,000 prize, while the latter are competing for the $100,000 cash prize.

During the progression of each episode, the women select men to go out with. The ending of the episode consisting of three men being chosen to be eliminated and afterwards revealing if they are a nice guy or not. While the nice guys that are eliminated are sent to a mansion called "Nice Guy Grotto" in a limousine, the fboys, sometimes also called Lotharios, are sent to "Limbro". This place lacks luxury and consists of huts made from bamboo, cots and hay-filled pillows. At some point in the first half of the series, the remaining male contestants reveal their own labels to the women and audience. The show always uses the abbreviation fboy; never during the complete run of the show is the full term fuckboy used by the contestants and host.

Apart from being entertainment, creator Elan Gale has stated that the show's alternative purpose is "to try to see if people can change for the right person," with the playboys becoming better partners and the "nice guys" getting recognition for their personality.

== Season 1 ==
=== Cast ===
Female cast member	Age	Occupation	Hometown
CJ Franco	30	Content creator and model	Los Angeles
Sarah Emig	25	Social media manager	Chicago
Nakia Renee	28	Singer and songwriter	Los Angeles

=== Male contestants ===
Male contestant	Category	Age	Occupation	Hometown	Entrance	Eliminated
Garrett Morosky	FBoy	28	Bitcoin investor	Los Angeles, CA	Episode 1	Sarah's Pick
Jared Motley	FBoy	27	Fitness coach	Miami, FL	Episode 1	Nakia's Pick
Casey Johnson	FBoy	24	IT recruiter	Cleveland, OH	Episode 7 Episode 1	Episode 10; Episode 4
Collin Carter	FBoy	26	Photographer/barber	Toledo, OH	Episode 1	Episode 8
Welcome Tjelmeland	FBoy	22	Club promoter	Miami, FL	Episode 3	Episode 8
Greg Metelus	FBoy	25	Content creator	Los Angeles, CA	Episode 1	Episode 8
Chris Gillis	FBoy	29	Real Estate broker	New York, NY	Episode 1	Episode 6
Jomar Pérez Adorno	FBoy	26	Dancemaster	Guaynabo, PR	Episode 3	Episode 6
Anthony Reed	FBoy	28	Health technician	Charlotte, NC	Episode 1	Episode 4
Casey Jones	FBoy	24	IT Recruiter	Cleveland, OH	Episode 1	Episode 4
Kevin Sun	FBoy	28	Event producer	Honolulu, HI	Episode 1	Episode 4
Charley Santos	FBoy	30	Model	Los Angeles, CA	Episode 1	Episode 2
Divij Vaswani	FBoy	24	Talent agent	Los Angeles, CA	Episode 1	Episode 2
Israel Dimri	FBoy	34	Entrepreneur	Los Angeles, CA	Episode 1	Episode 2
Peter Park	FBoy	30	Child Care/Influencer	Springfield, VA	Episode 1	Episode 1
Jarred Evans	Nice Guy	28	Entrepreneur	Miami, FL	Episode 3	CJ's Pick
Josh McDonald	Nice Guy	34	Brand marketer	Chicago, IL	Episode 1	Episode 10
Fernando Titus	Nice Guy	27	Chiropractor	Los Angeles, CA	Episode 1	Episode 10
Chaun Williams	Nice Guy	35	Image consultant	Las Vegas, NV	Episode 1	Episode 8
Cameron Brown	Nice Guy	29	Real estate agent	Las Vegas, NV	Episode 1	Episode 4
Paul Keating	Nice Guy	27	Fridge mover	Oceanside, CA	Episode 1	Episode 4
Tariq Johnson	Nice Guy	22	Nutritionist	Fort Collins, CO	Episode 1	Episode 4
Jamie Wood	Nice Guy	30	Ohio State Athletics	Columbus, OH	Episode 1	Episode 3
Mark Moran	Nice Guy	29	Investment banker	New York, NY	Episode 1	Episode 3
Matt Chamberlin	Nice Guy	22	Army National Guard	Nashville, TN	Episode 1	Episode 3
Ryan Garland	Nice Guy	27	Student	Tempe, AZ	Episode 1	Episode 3
Andrew Dietz	Nice Guy	29	Firefighter	Savannah, GA	Episode 1	Episode 1
Garratt Powers	Nice Guy	35	Firefighter	Seattle, WA	Episode 1	Episode 1

=== Contestant progress ===
Name	1	2	3	4	5	6	7	8	9	10
New Jarred			ENT	SAFE	BTM	SAFE	SAFE	BTM	SAFE	CHOSEN
OG Jared	SAFE	SAFE	SAFE	SAFE	BTM	BTM	SAFE	BTM	SAFE	CHOSEN
Garrett M	SAFE	SAFE	SAFE	SAFE	SAFE	BTM	SAFE	BTM	SAFE	CHOSEN
Casey	SAFE	SAFE	SAFE	CUT			RET	SAFE	SAFE	CUT
Fernando	SAFE	SAFE	BTM	SAFE	SAFE	SAFE	SAFE	SAFE	SAFE	CUT
Josh	SAFE	SAFE	SAFE	SAFE	SAFE	SAFE	SAFE	SAFE	SAFE	CUT
Chaun	SAFE	SAFE	SAFE	SAFE	SAFE	SAFE	SAFE	CUT	GUEST	
Collin	BTM	SAFE	SAFE	SAFE	SAFE	SAFE	SAFE	CUT	GUEST	
Welcome			ENT	SAFE	SAFE	SAFE	SAFE	CUT	GUEST	
Greg	SAFE	SAFE	SAFE	SAFE	SAFE	BTM	CUT		GUEST	
Chris	SAFE	BTM	BTM	SAFE	BTM	CUT			GUEST	
Jomar			ENT	SAFE	BTM	CUT			GUEST	
Kevin	SAFE	SAFE	BTM	CUT					GUEST	
Paul	BTM	SAFE	SAFE	CUT					GUEST	
Tariq	SAFE	BTM	SAFE	CUT					GUEST	
Anthony	SAFE	BTM	SAFE	CUT					GUEST	
Cameron	SAFE	SAFE	SAFE	CUT					GUEST	
Mark	SAFE	SAFE	CUT						GUEST	
Jamie	BTM	SAFE	CUT						GUEST	
Matt	SAFE	SAFE	CUT						GUEST	
Ryan	SAFE	SAFE	QUIT						GUEST	
Divij	SAFE	CUT							GUEST	
Israel	SAFE	CUT							GUEST	
Charley	SAFE	CUT							GUEST	
Peter	CUT								GUEST	
Garratt P.	CUT								GUEST	
Andrew	CUT								GUEST	

Key
The Nice Guy was CJ's final choice, and received half of the prize money
The FBoy was Nakia's final choice, and chose to split the money with her
The FBoy was Sarah's final choice, chose to keep all of the money for himself and lost it to a charity of her choice
The contestant escaped Limbro and returned to the game
The contestant entered the competition
The contestant was in CJ's bottom two
The contestant was in Nakia's bottom two
The contestant was in Sarah's bottom two
The contestant was eliminated by CJ
The contestant was eliminated by Nakia
The contestant was eliminated by Sarah
The contestant was eliminated by both CJ and Nakia
The contestant left the show for medical reasons
The contestant was brought back as a guest

== Season 2 ==
=== Cast ===
Female cast member	Age	Occupation	Hometown
Mia Emani	26	Dental student and former pageant queen	Tampa, Florida
Louise Barnard	25	Model	Michigan
Tamaris Sepulveda	29	Account executive	The Bronx

=== Male contestants ===
Returning contestants from season 1 included: Peter Park, Garrett Morosky, and finalist Casey Johnson.

Guys	Category	Age	Occupation	Hometown	Entrance	Eliminated
Mercedes Knox	FBoy	25	Human Resources	Dallas, TX	Episode 1	Louise's Pick
Peter Park	Fboy	31	Daycare Worker/Model	Springfield, VA	Episode 1	Mia's Pick
Benedict Polizzi	Nice Guy	31	Comedian	Indianapolis, IN	Episode 1	Episode 10
Casey Johnson	Nice Guy	25	Marketing Account Executive	Toledo, OH	Episode 3	Episode 10
Danny Louisa	Fboy	31	Electrician	Staten Island, NY	Episode 1	Episode 10
Niko Pilalis	Nice Guy	29	Medical Device Sales	Chicago, IL	Episode 9 Episode 1	Episode 10; Episode 5
Tom Carnifax	Nice Guy	24	Fitness Influencer	Warren, OH	Episode 1	Episode 9
Kian Lewis	Fboy	27	Accountant	Spartanburg, SC	Episode 1	Episode 8
Nick Warfield	Fboy	28	Graphic Designer	Grand Rapids, MI	Episode 1	Episode 8
Asanté Tait	Nice Guy	27	Stylist/Fashion Curator	Atlanta, GA	Episode 1	Episode 8
Braydon Elgar	Fboy	22	SoundCloud Rapper	Bloomington, IN	Episode 1	Episode 7
Aaron Spady	Nice Guy	30	Health & Wellness Coach	Miami, FL	Episode 3	Episode 7
JaBriane Ross	Nice Guy	28	Healthcare Worker	Sacramento, CA	Episode 1	Episode 7
Dewayne Rogers	Nice Guy	26	Behavioral Therapist	Boston, MA	Episode 1	Episode 5
Austin Sikora	Fboy	25	Doping Control Officer	Rockford, IL	Episode 3	Episode 5
A.C. Long	Nice Guy	28	Software Consultant	Kansas City, MO	Episode 1	Episode 4
Elijah Connolly	Fboy	23	Non-profit Coordinator	Waldorf, MD	Episode 3	Episode 4
Kyland Hewett-Newbill	Fboy	24	College Student	Springfield, MO	Episode 1	Episode 4
Noam Atzil	Fboy	27	Locksmith	Honolulu, HI	Episode 1	Episode 4
Brant Weiss	Nice Guy	27	Regional Sales Director	Columbus, OH	Episode 1	Episode 4
Jeremy Edberg	Nice Guy	33	Personal Trainer	Los Angeles, CA	Episode 1	Episode 4
Ilon Hao	Nice Guy	30	Model/Fitness Influencer	Sugarland, TX	Episode 1	Episode 3
Jared Seay	Nice Guy	25	Model/Content Creator	San Diego, CA	Episode 1	Episode 3
Michael Dakessian	FBoy	27	Martial Arts Specialist	Howell, NJ	Episode 1	Episode 3
Carlos Lopez	Nice Guy	30	Realtor/Personal Trainer	Burley, ID	Episode 1	Episode 2
Nikolay Pranchenko	FBoy	29	Server	Los Angeles, CA	Episode 1	Episode 2
Nick Priola	FBoy	26	Fitness Coach	Houston, TX	Episode 1	Episode 2
Zachary Wambold	FBoy	25	Bartender/Student	Toledo, OH	Episode 1	Episode 1
Lukasz Yoder	FBoy	21	Concert Pianist	Los Angeles, CA	Episode 1	Episode 1
John MgBemena	Nice Guy (Note: While John left before revealing his status, In Episode 3 Nikki revealed the girls had eliminated four FBoys and two Nice Guys so far.)	28	Pharmacy Technician	Atlanta, GA	Episode 1	Episode 1

=== Contestant progress ===
Name	1	2	3	4	5	6	7	8	9	10
Mercedes	SAFE	SAFE	SAFE	SAFE	SAFE	SAFE	BTM	SAFE	SAFE	CHOSEN
Peter	SAFE	SAFE	SAFE	SAFE	BTM	SAFE	SAFE	SAFE	SAFE	CHOSEN
Benedict	SAFE	SAFE	SAFE	SAFE	SAFE	SAFE	SAFE	SAFE	SAFE	CUT
Casey			ENT	SAFE	SAFE	SAFE	SAFE	SAFE	SAFE	CUT
Danny	BTM	SAFE	SAFE	SAFE	SAFE	SAFE	SAFE	SAFE	SAFE	CUT
Niko	SAFE	SAFE	SAFE	BTM	CUT				RET	CUT
Tom	SAFE	SAFE	SAFE	BTM	SAFE	SAFE	SAFE	SAFE	CUT	
Kian	SAFE	SAFE	SAFE	SAFE	SAFE	SAFE	BTM	CUT	GUEST	
Nick W	SAFE	SAFE	SAFE	SAFE	BTM	SAFE	SAFE	CUT	GUEST	
Asante	BTM	SAFE	SAFE	SAFE	SAFE	SAFE	BTM	CUT	GUEST	
Braydon	SAFE	SAFE	SAFE	SAFE	SAFE	SAFE	CUT		GUEST	
Aaron			ENT	SAFE	BTM	SAFE	CUT		GUEST	
JaBriane	SAFE	SAFE	SAFE	SAFE	SAFE	SAFE	CUT		GUEST	
Dewayne	SAFE	SAFE	BTM	BTM	CUT					
Austin			ENT	SAFE	CUT					
A.C.	SAFE	SAFE	SAFE	CUT						
Elijah			ENT	CUT						
Kyland	SAFE	SAFE	SAFE	CUT						
Noam	SAFE	BTM	SAFE	CUT						
Brant	SAFE	BTM	BTM	CUT						
Jeremy	SAFE	BTM	BTM	CUT						
Ilon	SAFE	SAFE	CUT							
Jared	BTM	SAFE	CUT							
Michael	SAFE	SAFE	CUT							
Carlos	SAFE	CUT								
Nikolay	SAFE	CUT								
Nick P	SAFE	CUT								
Zachary	CUT									
Lukasz	CUT									
John	QUIT									

Key
This guy was Mia's final choice
The contestant was in Mia's bottom two
The contestant was eliminated by Mia
This guy was Louise's final choice
The contestant was in Louise's bottom two
The contestant was eliminated by Louise
This guy was Tamaris's final choice
The contestant was in Tamaris's bottom two
The contestant was eliminated by Tamaris
The contestant escaped Limbro and returned to the game
The contestant entered the competition
The contestant chose to take himself out of the running
The contestant was brought back as a guest

== Season 3 ==
=== Cast ===
Female cast member	Age	Occupation	Hometown
Katie Thurston	32	comedian, previously on The Bachelorette	Seattle, WA
Daniella Grace	33	Influencer, real estate investor and swimwear brand founder	Marina Del Rey, CA
Hali Okeowo	28	Model	Brooklyn, NY

=== Male contestants ===
The season featured returning contestants Mercedes Knox, Benedict Polizzi and Danny Louisa.

Guys	Category	Age	Occupation	Hometown	Entrance	Eliminated
Vince X.	Nice Guy	31	Lawyer	Los Angeles, CA	Episode 1	Katie's Pick
Mercedes K.	FBoy	27	Season 2 winner	Dallas, TX	Episode 3	Hali's Pick
Christian L.	Nice Guy	30	Teacher/coach	Houston, TX	Episode 1	Daniella's Pick
Benedict P.	FBoy	33	Comedian/model	Indianapolis, IN	Episode 3	Episode 10
Elijah D.	FBoy	25	Trucking Company co-owner	Houston, TX	Episode 1	Episode 10
Jared A.	FBoy	24	Model/entrepreneur	Miami, FL	Episode 1	Episode 10
Marco D.	Nice Guy	28	Auditor/comedian	West Hollywood, CA	Episode 1	Episode 8
Evander C.	FBoy	25	Personal trainer	Milwaukee, WI	Episode 1	Episode 8
Curtis "CJ" W.	FBoy	24	Basketball player	Dallas, TX	Episode 1	Episode 8
Elisha D.	FBoy	25	Trucking Company co-owner	Houston, TX	Episode 1	Episode 6
Keith M.	FBoy	30	Opera singer	Las Vegas, NV	Episode 1	Episode 6
Danny L.	Nice Guy	32	Niko's (from season 2) step father	Miami, FL	Episode 3	Episode 6
Jonathan T.	Nice Guy	31	Fashion creative director	Los Angeles, CA	Episode 1	Episode 5
Pierce W.	Nice Guy	28	Yoga teacher	Los Angeles, CA	Episode 1	Episode 5
Deonte "Marquies" P.	Nice Guy	25	Fitness coach	Dallas, TX	Episode 1	Episode 5
Connor F.	FBoy	26	DJ/Healthcare consultant	Kansas City, MO	Episode 1	Episode 3
Nyk R.	Nice Guy	32	Singer songwriter	Los Angeles, CA	Episode 1	Episode 3
Steven C.	FBoy	23	Finance	St. Petersburgh, FL	Episode 1	Episode 3
Tanner G.	Nice Guy	25	Manual therapist/cyber security	Anaheim, CA	Episode 1	Episode 2
Kris T.	FBoy	25	Sales for a Medical Marketing Company	San Diego, CA	Episode 1	Episode 2
Bryce G.	Nice Guy	28	Consulting Firm owner	Los Angeles, CA	Episode 1	Episode 2
Dio P.	Nice Guy	30	Chippendales dancer	Las Vegas, NV	Episode 1	Episode 1
Shaun P.	FBoy	29	Personal trainer	Los Angeles, CA	Episode 1	Episode 1
Ian M.	FBoy	22	Hospitality & Branding Agency	Nashville, TN	Episode 1	Episode 1

=== Contestant progress ===
Name	1	2	3	4	5	6	7	8	9	10
Vince	SAFE	SAFE	SAFE	SAFE	SAFE	SAFE	SAFE	SAFE	SAFE	CHOSEN
Mercedes			ENT	SAFE	SAFE	SAFE	SAFE	SAFE	SAFE	CHOSEN
Christian	SAFE	SAFE	SAFE	SAFE	SAFE	SAFE	SAFE	SAFE	SAFE	CHOSEN
Benedict			ENT	SAFE	SAFE	SAFE	SAFE	SAFE	SAFE	CUT
Elijah	SAFE	SAFE	SAFE	SAFE	SAFE	BTM	SAFE	SAFE	SAFE	CUT
Jared	SAFE	BTM	SAFE	SAFE	SAFE	SAFE	SAFE	SAFE	SAFE	CUT
Marco	SAFE	BTM	SAFE	BTM	SAFE	BTM	SAFE	CUT	GUEST	
Evander	BTM	SAFE	SAFE	BTM	SAFE	SAFE	SAFE	CUT	GUEST	
Curtis "CJ"	SAFE	SAFE	SAFE	SAFE	SAFE	BTM	SAFE	CUT	GUEST	
Elisha	SAFE	SAFE	SAFE	SAFE	SAFE	CUT			GUEST	
Keith	SAFE	SAFE	SAFE	SAFE	SAFE	CUT			GUEST	
Danny			BTM	BTM	SAFE	CUT			GUEST	
Jonathan	SAFE	SAFE	BTM	CUT					GUEST	
Pierce	SAFE	SAFE	SAFE	CUT					GUEST	
Deonte "Marquies"	SAFE	BTM	BTM	CUT					GUEST	
Connor	SAFE	SAFE	CUT						GUEST	
Nyk	SAFE	SAFE	CUT						GUEST	
Steven	BTM	SAFE	CUT						GUEST	
Tanner	SAFE	CUT							GUEST	
Kris	BTM	CUT							GUEST	
Bryce	SAFE	CUT							GUEST	
Dio	CUT									
Shaun	CUT									
Ian	CUT									

Key
This guy was Katie's final choice
The contestant was in Katie's bottom two
The contestant was eliminated by Katie
This guy was Hali's final choice
The contestant was in Hali's bottom two
The contestant was eliminated by Hali
This guy was Daniella's final choice
The contestant was in Daniella's bottom two
The contestant was eliminated by Daniella
The contestant escaped Limbro and returned to the game
The contestant entered the competition
The contestant chose to take himself out of the running
The contestant was brought back as a guest

== Episodes ==
=== Series overview ===
Season	Episodes	Originally released		
Season	Episodes	First released	Last released	Network
1	10	July 29, 2021	August 12, 2021	HBO Max
2	10	July 14, 2022	August 4, 2022	HBO Max
3	10	October 16, 2023	December 8, 2023	The CW

=== Season 1 (2021) ===
No. overall	No. in season	Title	Original release date
1	1	"FBoys Rush In"	July 29, 2021
2	2	"You've Got Male"	July 29, 2021
3	3	"Sex, Lies and Selfies"	July 29, 2021
4	4	"Sleepless in the Villa"	August 5, 2021
5	5	"There's Something About Nakia"	August 5, 2021
6	6	"How Sarah Got Her Groove Back"	August 5, 2021
7	7	"Chasing CJ"	August 12, 2021
8	8	"True Bromance"	August 12, 2021
9	9	"50 Shades of Nice"	August 12, 2021
10	10	"FBoy, FBye?"	August 12, 2021

=== Season 2 (2022) ===
No. overall	No. in season	Title	Original release date
11	1	"Do You Like Cats?"	July 14, 2022
12	2	"6'3 Down Under"	July 14, 2022
13	3	"You're Goofy"	July 14, 2022
14	4	"I Did Not Say That"	July 21, 2022
15	5	"I Heard You Were a Snake"	July 21, 2022
16	6	"I Was A Piece of Sh*t"	July 21, 2022
17	7	"Kiss That Yogurt"	July 28, 2022
18	8	"Tom's Journal"	July 28, 2022
19	9	"Man-Cision"	August 4, 2022
20	10	"The Men Have No Idea"	August 4, 2022

=== Season 3 (2023) ===
No. overall	No. in season	Title	Original release date	U.S. viewers (millions)	Rating/share (18-49)
21	1	"This is Gonna Be a Good Season"	October 16, 2023	0.16	0.02/0
22	2	"I Care, Bro"	October 16, 2023	0.16	0.02/0
23	3	"Bro Stole My Eggs"	October 23, 2023	0.18	0.03/0
24	4	"Game Over"	October 30, 2023	0.18	0.04/0
25	5	"I Know You Love You"	November 3, 2023	0.22	0.03/0
26	6	"F, Marry, Ghost"	November 10, 2023	0.24	0.04/1
27	7	"You're Joking, Right?"	November 17, 2023	0.22	0.04/0
28	8	"The Secrets Are Out"	November 24, 2023	0.22	0.04/0
29	9	"Most Vulnerable Player"	December 1, 2023	0.20	0.04/0
30	10	"I Was Just Playing the Game"	December 8, 2023	0.19	0.04/0

== Production ==
The series was created by The Bachelor producer Elan Gale and showrun by Sam Dean. Executive producers included host Nikki Glaser, Ben Bitoni, Sam Dean, Elan Gale and Jason Goldberg. The title comes from the slang term fuck boy, used to refer to a male womanizer. HBO Max marketed it as "a social experiment that asks the age-old question: Can FBoys truly reform, or do Nice Guys always finish last?"

The series premiered on the streaming service on July 29, 2021, with the simultaneous release of its first three episodes, with another three being released on August 5 and the final four on August 12. Upon release, it became the streaming service's most-watched reality program. On August 18, 2021, HBO Max renewed the series for a second season.

On December 5, 2022, HBO Max canceled the series, with the show's production company, STXalternative, shopping it to other networks and platforms. On March 16, 2023, it was reported that The CW had picked up the series for a third season, along with the spinoff FGirl Island. On May 2, 2023, it was announced that Glaser would return as the host, and that the third season would premiere on July 16, 2023,

On September 28, 2023, it was announced that the third season would premiere on October 16, 2023.

=== Impact of the COVID-19 pandemic ===
The series was filmed in the Cayman Islands, in part due to "its low number of COVID-19 cases" with the cast having to arrive at Grand Cayman 14 days before shooting commenced in March 2021 to quarantine and be tested for COVID-19 on alternate days until April.

== Lawsuit ==
On May 2, 2023, producer and writer Jack Piuggi of Flipp Productions, LLC filed a lawsuit claiming the show's concept was stolen from him, alleging he shared the concept of a reality-based documentary called "Instafamous" under a non-disclosure agreement with production companies affiliated with HBO. On February 24, 2025, the court ordered the complaint dismissed with Prejudice. Upon review, the court determined that Instafamous was not substantially similar to either Fake Famous or FBoy Island. The court found that the "total concept and feel" of the works were vastly different. The court concluded that Jack Piuggi had failed to establish substantial similarity and dismissed the claim.

== International releases ==
In the UK, BBC Three acquired the show. On April 28, 2022, HBO Max announced local versions for Denmark, Sweden, Spain, and The Netherlands.

=== Adaptations ===
A New Zealand adaptation began airing on TVNZ in October 2022, hosted by Shav Ruakere and filmed in the Cook Islands. One of the male contestants named Wayde Moore was edited out of the show prior to the premiere after it was learned that he had been on trial for attempted suffocation of a drunken woman; he was found not guilty but the judge described his behavior as "deeply inappropriate and disrespectful".

An Australian adaptation was announced by Foxtel in October 2022 and was released on its streaming service, Binge, from May 2023. It was hosted by Abbie Chatfield and was filmed in Casuarina, which is located in north-eastern New South Wales in the Tweed Shire.

== Reception ==
Salon.com's Kylie Chung called the show "highly self-aware and entertainingly self-deprecating," while pointing out its central theme of "couple goals", when the female contestants choose their partners. In a separate Salon.com review Melanie McFarland commented that the show "flaunts its identity as the messy, issues-burdened lovechild of dating app culture as brightly as a neon wristband," mentioning that it is destined for both fans as well as critiques as the genre, such as commenting that the women shrug off the misogyny the men express and hoping they can alter their behavior." Lea Palmieri, writing for Decider, stated that it "feels like a modern dating show throughout" since "it takes itself less seriously and celebrates how silly it is that this show even exists."

The Washington Post's Inkoo Kang commented that it "works so well because it takes the 'fboy' part seriously: They're there to be ogled, judged and ultimately taken down a peg" which creates "something encouraging about a show that isn't just about whether a woman can find a man, but the right one for her." For her part, Time's Judy Berman, in a two-show review of the series and Sexy Beasts, commented on the former that it "happens to be a funny, addictive, shrewdly executed twist on a familiar format. I can't say the same for Beasts," and calling the female contestants "relatively intelligent and perceptive, but also generally have each other's backs." The A.V. Club's Danette Chaves concurred with Berman, calling the women "likable and clear-eyed about the choices they're making," concluding that the show "is a work in progress, but still worth checking out."

Other critics were not as favorable, such as Variety's Caroline Framke, who started her review by stating that "[i]t didn't take long for FBoy Island to make me feel like my brain was leaking out my ears, drip by stupefied drip," calling the use of the abbreviated term fboys "one of [HBO Max's] most baffling, annoying mysteries." For her part, Alessa Dominguez of BuzzFeed News called it "an anemic The Bachelorette", observing the lack of time "to get to know anyone … and the guys all play even bigger caricatures of the types favored by the typical reality show," calling the men "even more one-dimensional than the women." Metro Weekly's André Hereford partly agreed with Berman, Chaves and Dominguez's characterizations of the female contestants stating, "[they] are all likable, but they don't make astute choices," giving the show two out of five stars for "[saving] a few jaw-dropping twists till the end, which might be too late for some who have already escaped to more inviting shores." While The Daily Beast's Cheyenne Roundtree wrote that it "somehow manages to teeter between an exciting, funny concept and a half-baked idea that needs to work out its kinks," the latter referring to scenes such as when the remaining contestants reveal their label and yet the women continue to foster relationships with some of the fboys. Megan Reynolds of Jezebel stated that "dating shows are past the point of reinvention," with the "[attempt] to place the power back in the hands of the women, a limp gesture towards something that could be called feminism."
