= Jeff Ross =

American stand-up comedian (born 1965)

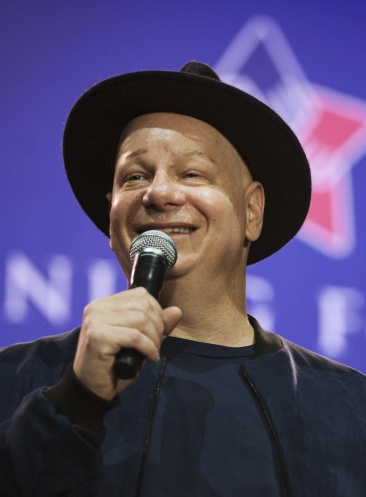
- Ross in May 2016
- Born: Jeffrey Ross Lifschultz; September 13, 1965 (age 61)
- Other name: Roastmaster General
- Education: Boston University (B.S.)
- Notable work: Comedy Central Roasts; Patriot Act: A Jeffrey Ross Home Movie; The Burn with Jeff Ross

Comedy career
- Years active: 1989–present
- Medium: Stand-up, television, film
- Genres: Observational comedy, insult comedy, black comedy, cringe comedy, satire
- Subjects: American politics, Jewish culture, popular culture, self-deprecation, sex, current events, religion
- Website: roastmastergeneral.com

Jeffrey Ross Lifschultz (born September 13, 1965) is an American stand-up comedian, actor, director and producer. He is nicknamed the "Roastmaster General" for his insult comedy, his multiple appearances at celebrity roasts held by the New York Friars Club, the Comedy Central Roast television series, and the Netflix historical comedy series Historical Roasts. In 2009, the Chicago Tribune called Ross "the new millennium Don Rickles." His directorial debut, the 2006 documentary Patriot Act: A Jeffrey Ross Home Movie, won the prize for Best Film at the Comedia film festival held at the Just for Laughs comedy festival in Montreal.

== Early life ==
Ross was raised in Newark, New Jersey, until he was in second grade; then his family moved to Union, New Jersey, and later to Springfield, New Jersey, where he attended Jonathan Dayton High School. He is Jewish and has a younger sister named Robyn. His mother Marsha died from leukemia when he was 14 years old. His father died of drug-related causes when Ross was 19 years old and attending college. His father owned and ran Clinton Manor Catering, a business that was started by Ross's great-grandmother. The business was located in Newark, and later moved to Union.

Ross attended Boston University as a broadcasting and film major with a minor in political science. He graduated from the Boston University College of Communication in 1987. Ross also worked as the music director at the university's student-run radio station WTBU in addition to working for the university's public radio station WBUR where he was an audio engineer.

== Career ==
=== Stand-up, writing and roast comedy ===
Ross began performing stand-up in 1989 after attending a comedy class. He appeared on A&E's An Evening at the Improv in 1994. By 1995, he was performing at iconic New York clubs like the Comedy Cellar and Stand Up NY. That same year, he was invited by the New York Friars Club to participate in a roast of actor Steven Seagal.

Ross became a regular at the Friars Club roasts and was given the title of "Roastmaster General". The Friars Club's first televised event was the roast of Drew Carey that was broadcast on Comedy Central in 1998. Ross credits a particular joke that he made at the expense of attendees Bea Arthur and Sandra Bernhard at the 1999 roast of Jerry Stiller for taking his roasting career to the next level. That same year Jimmy Kimmel hired Ross as a writer on The Man Show and Ross also wrote some of the punchlines for Billy Crystal's monologue at the Oscars in 2000.

In 2003, Comedy Central began producing their own celebrity roasts. Ross has been a roaster at all Comedy Central roasts since the 2005 roast of Pamela Anderson. During his Comedy Central Roast appearances, Ross became known for dressing up in edgy and sometimes controversial costumes: He roasted Charlie Sheen dressed as Muammar Gaddafi; he roasted Rob Lowe dressed as Purple Rain-era Prince on an episode that aired five months after the musician's death; he roasted Roseanne Barr dressed as the late football coach Joe Paterno during the height of the Penn State child sex abuse scandal; he also roasted James Franco wearing cornrows and a neck tattoo in reference to Franco's character in the 2012 film Spring Breakers.

Ross has participated as a roaster on the following Comedy Central Roasts:

- Pamela Anderson (2005)
- William Shatner (2006)
- Flavor Flav (2007)
- Bob Saget (2008)
- Larry the Cable Guy (2009)
- Joan Rivers (2009)
- David Hasselhoff (2010)
- Donald Trump (2011)
- Charlie Sheen (2011)
- Roseanne Barr (2012)
- James Franco (2013)
- Justin Bieber (2015)
- Rob Lowe (2016)
- The Border (2017)
- Bruce Willis (2018)
- Alec Baldwin (2019)

Ross has also written for, performed in or produced the roasts of the following celebrities:

- Drew Carey (1998), produced by the New York Friars Club
- Jerry Stiller (1999), produced by the New York Friars Club
- Rob Reiner (2000), produced by the New York Friars Club
- Hugh Hefner (2001), produced by the New York Friars Club
- Carson Daly (2003), produced by MTV
- Gene Simmons (2008), produced by A&E
- Emmitt Smith (2008), produced by Shaquille O'Neal in the second installment of his TV series Shaq's All Star Comedy Roast
- Mike Greenberg and Mike Golic (aka Mike & Mike) (2008), produced by ESPN
- Tom Brady (2024), produced by Netflix
- Kevin Hart (2026), produced by Netflix

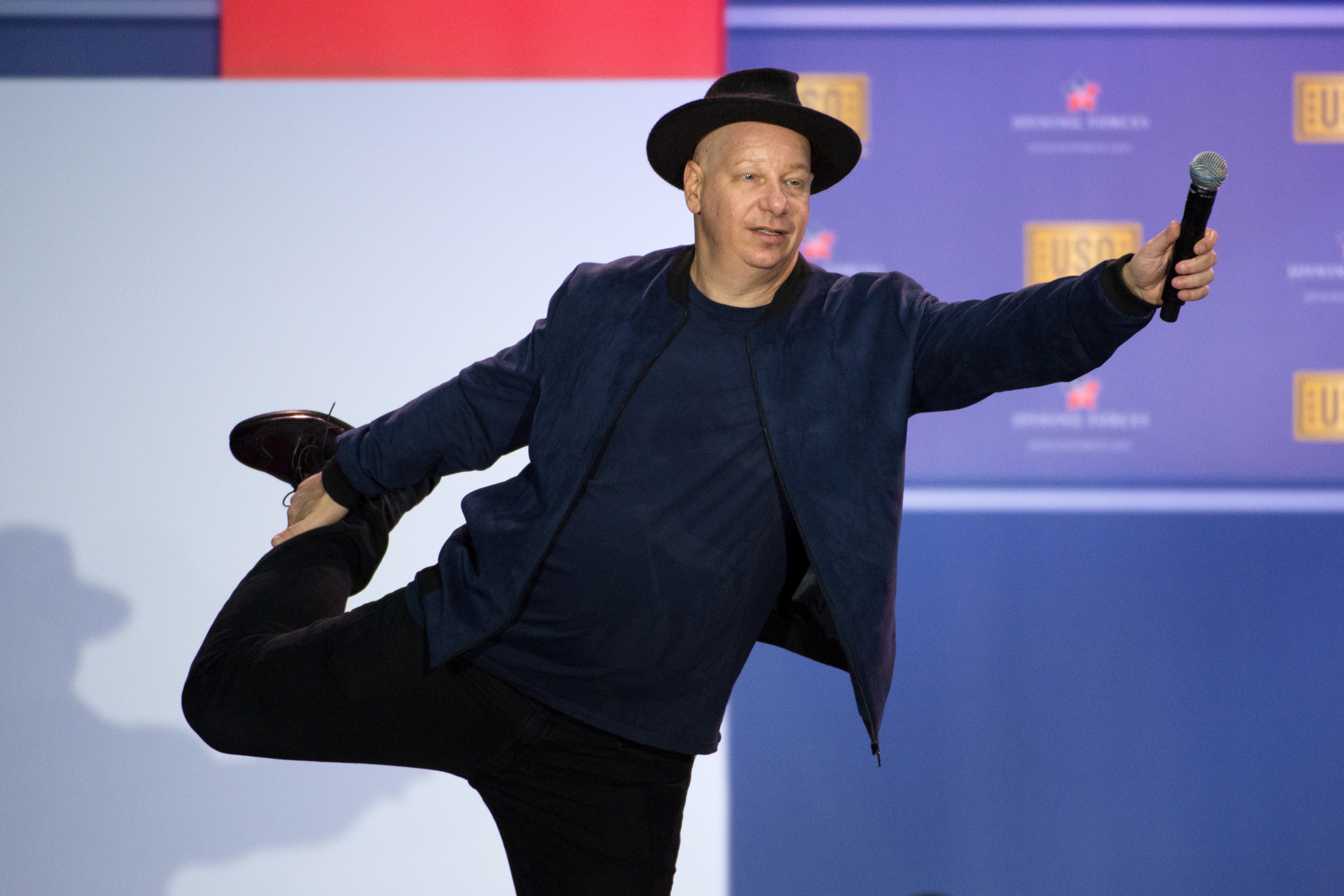
Ross at Joint Base Andrews in May 2016

Ross has taken part in several USO tours and has performed stand-up comedy at US military bases in Afghanistan, Guantanamo Bay and Iraq. Ross first traveled to Iraq in 2003 as part of a comedy tour hosted by Drew Carey. In 2005 Ross released the film Patriot Act: A Jeffrey Ross Home Movie, which he both produced and directed and which documented his experiences on the Iraq tour. That same year the film won the prize for Best Film at the Comedia film festival, a comedy film festival held annually in Montreal as part of the Just for Laughs comedy festival. In 2006 the film was shown on Showtime and also screened at that year's South by Southwest Film Festival. In 2017 the USO made Ross the Ambassador of Veterans Outreach for the Artists & Athletes Alliance.

Ross published his first book, I Only Roast the Ones I Love: Busting Balls Without Burning Bridges, in 2009. The book recounts his journey to becoming Roastmaster General and includes tips on writing roast jokes and how to put on a roast.

Ross was the creator and host of the comedy panel show The Burn with Jeff Ross, which aired on Comedy Central for two seasons from 2012 to 2013.

In 2015, Ross starred in the Comedy Central special Jeff Ross Roasts Criminals: Live from Brazos County Jail, where he performed stand-up comedy for male and female convicts in Brazos County, Texas. The following year he released Jeff Ross Roasts Cops where he performed for members of the Boston Police Department.

Ross and comedian Brian Moses launched Jeff Ross Presents Roast Battle on Comedy Central in 2016. The show consists of comedians competing in one-on-one roast battles where the winners are decided by Ross and a panel of guest judges. Ross also appeared as a battler in final episode of the show's third season in a battle with NBA player Blake Griffin.

In 2018, Ross and fellow comedian Dave Attell embarked on their Bumping Mics comedy tour. Footage of their tour was also released in a three-part special, Bumping Mics with Jeff Ross & Dave Attell, on Netflix, the series was filmed during three of their performances at the Comedy Cellar in New York City. Their shows consisted of observational and political humor interspersed with Ross and Attell roasting one another as well as members of the audience. The comedians also invited audience members onto the stage, some of whom included Bob Saget, Gilbert Gottfried, Michael Che, Amy Schumer, Nikki Glaser and Paul Rudd.

Starting in 2019, Netflix began airing the series Historical Roasts, where Ross hosts fictionalized versions of comedy roasts for figures like Abraham Lincoln and Anne Frank.

In 2025, Ross made his Broadway debut with a limited run of his one-man show, Take A Banana For The Ride. The show chronicled Ross' roast career, his personal life, and his experiences with grief, notably with the losses of his parents, his dog, and his friends Gilbert Gottfried, Bob Saget, and Norm Macdonald. It opened on August 18 at the Nederlander Theatre to positive reviews, and closed on September 28.

The Riyadh Comedy Festival began on September 26, ending on October 9, with Ross as one of a line-up of comedians slated to perform. Joey Shea, Saudi Arabia researcher at Human Rights Watch, said in a statement that the Saudi government is using the comedy festival to whitewash its human rights abuses.

=== Acting and voice work ===
One of Ross's first acting roles was a small part in the 1996 comedy film Celtic Pride. Some of his other film roles include a security guard in the film Stuck on You (2003) and a wedding band leader in the film Along Came Polly (2004). Ross's television acting work includes roles on HBO's Six Feet Under and Crashing, and Showtime's Weeds. He also played a dramatic role on CBS's CSI.

Ross was co-creator of the satirical animated program Where My Dogs At? that was broadcast on MTV2 in 2006. The series centers around characters Buddy, a beagle voiced by Ross, and Woof, a bulldog voiced by Tracy Morgan. Ross has also voiced characters on two episodes of the animated series Future-Worm! as well as on an episode of the live-action/animated series Happy! He also voiced himself in the 2012 episode of Batman: The Brave and the Bold, "Crisis: 22,300 Miles Above Earth!", attending a literal roast of Batman.

=== Other appearances as himself ===
Ross appeared in the 2005 documentary The Aristocrats about the famous dirty joke of the same name.

He was the guest on the debut episode of the WTF with Marc Maron podcast in 2009 and also appeared on the podcast's 800th episode in 2017.

Ross appeared in the third tournament of Celebrity Poker Showdown in 2004, but lost in his first match. He was also a competitor on the seventh season of Dancing with the Stars that aired in 2008. During rehearsal for their first dance, his dancing partner Edyta Śliwińska accidentally poked Ross in the eye, causing a scratched cornea. Against medical advice, Ross continued the competition, but the couple were the first to be eliminated.

In 2011, Ross visited the protesters of the Occupy movement in Los Angeles to support their cause. He took to the microphone at a stage set-up at Los Angeles City Hall. His talk included roasting Wall Street and the big banks.

In 2019, he appeared on an episode of Crank Yankers as himself.

== Personal life ==
Ross credits his tough upbringing in New Jersey for helping him develop his talent for insult comedy, which he says he developed as a defense mechanism. Ross stated in an interview with The Atlanta Constitution: "Everyone in my family was good at [roasting]. I had to quickly learn not just to take a joke but to give it back. My uncle Murray was the first to bust my chops. We called him Mean Murray."

In June 2020, an allegation that Ross had engaged in a sexual relationship with a 15-year-old when he was 34 was published in the media; his accuser, Jessica Radtke, had also posted these allegations on her Facebook page in 2019. Ross disputed the accusation, claiming that his relationship with Radtke did not begin until 2002, when Radtke was an adult. In November 2020, Ross filed a defamation suit in the New York State Supreme Court, in which multiple named witnesses asserted that Radtke's claims were inaccurate and dishonest; Ross' legal team accused Radtke of extorting Ross for "significant sums of money". He dropped the case in March 2023.

In the fall of 2024, Ross was diagnosed with stage 3 colon cancer. He had seven inches of his colon removed and underwent six months of chemotherapy.

== Filmography ==
=== Film ===
Year	Title	Role	Notes
1996	Celtic Pride	Car Theft Victim	
1998	Taxman	Tax Collector	
2000	Isn't She Great	Shecky	
2000	The Adventures of Rocky and Bullwinkle	District Attorney	
2003	National Security	Security Guard	
2003	Stuck on You	Beaze Security Guard	
2004	Along Came Polly	Wedding Band Leader	
2006	American Dreamz	Oscar	
2006	Jackass Number Two		Writer
2007	Farce of the Penguins	Funny-Looking Bastard	Voice
2007	Jackass 2.5	Himself	Writer; Guest appearance
2008	One, Two, Many	Ernie	Direct-to-video
2011	A Novel Romance	Douglas Silver	
2015	The Wedding Ringer	Wedding Singer	
2016	Flock of Dudes	Masturbator	
2016	The Comedian		Writer
2017	Gilbert	Himself	Documentary
2017	The Emoji Movie	Internet Troll	Voice
2024	Ricky Stanicky	Rabbi Greenberg	
2024	Torching 2024: A Roast of the Year	Self	Comedy Special

=== Television ===
Year	Title	Role	Notes
1994	A&E's An Evening at the Improv	Himself	Episode: "Dom Irrera, Bob Dubac, Jeff Ross, and more!"
1996	Dr. Katz, Professional Therapist	Jeffrey	Voice, episode: "Blind Date"
1999	Cosby	Carl	2 episodes
2000	Shasta McNasty	Bank Manager	Episode: "True Size"
2002	Greg the Bunny	Security Guard	Episode: "Welcome to Sweetknuckle Junction"
2002	Six Feet Under	Shiva Comic	Episode: "Back to the Garden"
2003	CSI: Crime Scene Investigation	Dougie Max	Episode: "Last Laugh"
2005	Weeds	Billy	Episode: "Dead in the Nethers"
2006	Where My Dogs At?	Buddy	Voice, 8 episodes
2007	The Sarah Silverman Program	Himself	Episode: "Ah, Men"
2010	Childrens Hospital	Himself	Episode: "Joke Overload"
2011	Big Time Rush	Insult Comic	Episode: "Big Time Guru"
2011	Batman: The Brave and the Bold	Himself	Voice, episode: "Crisis: 22,300 Miles Above Earth!"
2012	Family Guy	Himself	Voice, 2 episodes
2012–2013	The Burn with Jeff Ross	Himself	12 episodes
2014	Drunk History	Francis Scott Key	Episode: "Baltimore"
2014	The Simpsons	Himself	Voice, episode: "Clown in the Dumps"
2014	Comedy Bang! Bang!	Himself	Episode: "Amber Tamblyn Wears a Leather Jacket & Black Booties"
2016	Grandfathered	Marv	Episode: "Some Guy I'm Seeing"
2016	Dr. Ken	Doug	Episode: "Ken Tries Standup"
2016–2018	Jeff Ross Presents Roast Battle	Himself	19 episodes
2016	The Mr. Peabody & Sherman Show	Aristophanes	Voice, episode: "Aristophanes"
2016	Future-Worm!	Mr. Bleaker	Voice, 2 episodes
2017–2018	Crashing	Himself	2 episodes
2017–2019	Rapunzel's Tangled Adventure	Hook Foot	Voice, 24 episodes
2017	American Dad!	Chief Danny	Voice, episode: "Camp Campawanda"
2017	Penn Zero: Part-Time Hero	Sonny	Voice, 2 episodes
2017	Teachers	Fire Marshal Brownstein	Episode: "Toxic Workplace"
2018	Bumping Mics with Jeff Ross & Dave Attell	Himself	3 episodes
2019	Sneaky Pete	D.C. Doug	4 episodes
2019	Happy!	Twigs	Voice, 2 episodes
2019	Historical Roasts	Himself	6 episodes
2019–2020	Crank Yankers	Himself	Voice, 2 episodes
2021	Ghost Adventures	Himself	1 episode
2021	The Wonderful World of Mickey Mouse	Lead Ghost	Voice, episode: "Houseghosts"
2023	Celebrity Wheel of Fortune	Himself - Contestant	Episode: "Lauren Lapkus, Ego Nwodim and Jeff Ross"
2024	Stupid Pet Tricks	Himself	Episode: "Animal Speed Roast"
2024	Lopez vs Lopez	Jeff	Episode: "Lopez vs the Roast of George Lopez"

== Discography ==
- No Offense (2008, Shout! Factory) – CD/DVD/Download
