= Lovers and Liars (TV series) =

American dating reality television series

- Also known as: FGirl Island
- Created by: Elan Gale
- Presented by: Nikki Glaser
- No. of seasons: 1
- No. of episodes: 10

Production
- Executive producers: Elan Gale; Jason Goldberg; Nikki Glaser; Bill Dixon; Audrey E. Smith
- Production location: Malibu, California
- Production companies: STXalternative; TheYearOfElan Productions

Original release
- Network: The CW (episodes 1–7); The CW App (episodes 8–10)
- Release: April 1 – May 30, 2024

Related
- FBoy Island

Lovers and Liars is an American dating reality television series which premiered on April 1, 2024, on The CW. The show is a spinoff of FBoy Island franchise and was known as FGirl Island during development.

== Premise ==
Three single men arrive at a tropical island to determine which of the 24 female contestants are there to find love or to win the final $100,000 prize.

== Overview ==
=== Cast ===
Male cast member	Original FBoy Island season
Casey Johnson	season 1
Benedict Polizzi	season 2
CJ Weathers	season 3

=== Female contestants ===
Girls	Category	Hometown	Occupation	Entrance	Eliminated
Hannah	Nice Girl	West Hollywood, CA	Celebrity Wardrobe Stylist	Episode 1	Casey's pick
Kiara	Nice Girl	Rancho Cucamonga, CA	Dance Instructor	Episode 1	CJ's pick
Jan Danielle	FGirl	Irvine, CA	Festival Fashion Designer	Episode 1	Benedict's pick
Michi	FGirl	Fort Lauderdale, FL	IT Manager	Episode 1	Episode 10
India	FGirl	Fontana, CA	Fitness Trainer	Episode 1	Episode 10
Jazlyn	Nice Girl	Orlando, FL	Cocktail Waitress	Episode 1	Episode 10
Camille	Nice Girl	Fort Lauderdale, FL	Singer/Songwriter	Episode 1	Episode 8
Dani	Nice Girl	St. Petersburg, FL	Bartender	Episode 1	Episode 8
Lauren	Nice Girl	Tampa Bay, FL	Pilates Instructor	Episode 1	Episode 8
Sabrina	Nice Girl	Sacramento, CA	Former Miss California	Episode 1	Episode 6
Sydney	FGirl	Los Angeles, CA	Social Media Model	Episode 1	Episode 6
Fatemeh	FGirl	Dallas, TX	Real Estate Investor	Episode 1	Episode 6
Lexee	FGirl	Oahu, HI	Bartender	Episode 1	Episode 5
Yasmeena	Nice Girl	Los Angeles, CA	Indie Recording "Artist"	Episode 1	Episode 5
Mia	FGirl	Miami, FL	FBoy Island season 2 lead	Episode 3	Episode 5
Victoria	Nice Girl	Miami, FL	Nursing Student	Episode 3	Episode 4
Shenasia	FGirl	Atlanta, GA	Entrepreneur	Episode 1	Episode 4
Elizabeth	Nice Girl	Los Angeles, CA	Radiology Intern	Episode 1	Episode 4
Anissa	FGirl	Las Vegas, NV	Cocktail Server	Episode 1	Episode 3
Alana	FGirl	San Francisco, CA	Registered Nurse	Episode 1	Episode 3
Kimberly	FGirl	Atlanta, GA	Social Media Influencer	Episode 3	Episode 3
Jayna	Nice Girl	Huntington Beach, CA	Hair Stylist	Episode 1	Episode 2
Alyssa	Nice Girl	Brooklyn, NY	Model	Episode 1	Episode 2
Brianna D	FGirl	Austin, TX	Account Manager	Episode 1	Episode 2
Michelle U	Nice Girl	Oahu, HI	Model	Episode 1	Episode 1
Brianna A	FGirl	Los Angeles, CA	Model	Episode 1	Episode 1
Jasmine	FGirl	Austin, TX	Finance Executive	Episode 1	Episode 1

=== Contestant progress ===
Name	1	2	3	4	5	6	7	8	9	10
Hannah	SAFE	SAFE	SAFE	SAFE	SAFE	BTM	SAFE	SAFE	SAFE	CHOSEN
Kiara	BTM	SAFE	SAFE	SAFE	SAFE	BTM	SAFE	SAFE	SAFE	CHOSEN
Jan Danielle	SAFE	SAFE	SAFE	SAFE	BTM	SAFE	SAFE	SAFE	SAFE	CHOSEN
Michi	SAFE	SAFE	SAFE	SAFE	SAFE	SAFE	SAFE	SAFE	SAFE	CUT
India	SAFE	SAFE	BTM	SAFE	SAFE	SAFE	SAFE	SAFE	SAFE	CUT
Jazlyn	SAFE	SAFE	SAFE	BTM	SAFE	SAFE	SAFE	SAFE	SAFE	CUT
Camille	SAFE	SAFE	SAFE	BTM	SAFE	SAFE	SAFE	CUT	GUEST	
Dani	SAFE	SAFE	SAFE	SAFE	SAFE	SAFE	SAFE	CUT	GUEST	
Lauren	SAFE	SAFE	SAFE	SAFE	SAFE	BTM	SAFE	CUT	GUEST	
Sabrina	SAFE	SAFE	SAFE	SAFE	BTM	CUT			GUEST	
Sydney	SAFE	SAFE	SAFE	SAFE	BTM	CUT			GUEST	
Fatemah	SAFE	SAFE	BTM	SAFE	SAFE	CUT			GUEST	
Lexee	SAFE	BTM	SAFE	SAFE	CUT				GUEST	
Yasmeena	SAFE	BTM	SAFE	SAFE	CUT				GUEST	
Mia			ENT	BTM	CUT				GUEST	
Victoria			BTM	CUT					GUEST	
Shenasia	SAFE	SAFE	SAFE	CUT					GUEST	
Elizabeth	SAFE	BTM	SAFE	CUT					GUEST	
Anissa	SAFE	SAFE	CUT						GUEST	
Alana	SAFE	SAFE	CUT						GUEST	
Kimberly			CUT							
Jayna	BTM	CUT								
Alyssa	BTM	CUT								
Brianna D	SAFE	CUT								
Michelle U	CUT									
Brianna A	CUT									
Jasmine	CUT									

Key
This girl was Casey's final choice
The contestant was in Casey's bottom two
The contestant was eliminated by Casey
This girl was CJ's final choice
The contestant was in CJ's bottom two
The contestant was eliminated by CJ
This girl was Benedict's final choice
The contestant was in Benedict's bottom two
The contestant was eliminated by Benedict
The contestant entered the competition

== Production ==
On March 16, 2023, it was announced that The CW had ordered the series under the title FGirl Island. On February 15, 2024, the series was renamed Lovers and Liars and it was also announced that the series would premiere on April 1, 2024.

== Episodes ==
No.	Title	Original release date	Prod. code	U.S. viewers (millions)	Rating/share (18-49)
1	"Women Are Too Good"	April 1, 2024	101	0.14	0.04/0
2	"I'm Not Ready for This Convo"	April 18, 2024	102	0.22	0.03/0
3	"Rave Crashers"	April 25, 2024	103	0.13	0.02/0
4	"Call Me Toxic"	May 2, 2024	104	0.17	0.03/0
5	"You Can Look, but You Can't DM"	May 9, 2024	105	0.16	0.03/0
6	"Who is Bill Murray"	May 16, 2024	106	0.16	0.03/0
7	"I Put a Spell on You"	May 23, 2024	107	0.20	0.03/0
8	"Failure Swift"	May 30, 2024	108	N/A	N/A
9	"The Claws Are Out"	May 30, 2024	109	N/A	N/A
10	"Lovers or Liars"	May 30, 2024	110	N/A	N/A
