= Henry Phillips (comedian) =

American musician, actor and comedian (born 1969)

- Born: November 14, 1969 (age 56); Los Angeles, California, U.S.
- Occupations: comedian; actor
- Notable work: Henry's Kitchen

Henry Phillips (born November 14, 1969) is an American comedy musician and actor. He co-wrote and starred in Punching the Clown and its sequel, Punching Henry. He has made many appearances in films, television shows and podcasts, and is the creator of the web series "Henry's Kitchen".

== Early life ==
Phillips was born on November 14, 1969, in Los Angeles, California to Mary Linda Phillips and character actor Bill Wiley. He started playing guitar when he was 8 years old and was inspired by Billy Joel as a teen.

== Career ==
In 2005, Phillips appeared on season 9 of Comedy Central Presents. In 2009, he co-wrote and starred in Punching the Clown, and appeared in the comedy special 4:20 Hour Stand-Up, directed by Lee Abbott and starring Doug Benson. From 2013, Phillips directed and starred in the television and web series You and Your Fu*king Coffee. The series stars Mike Judge and is produced by Jash. The series is described as being about "a man who politely asks for coffee, and in doing so, ends up destroying the lives of those around him." On July 22, 2014, Phillips appeared on Season 2 Episode 4 of Drunk History. In 2016, he co-wrote and starred in Punching Henry, a sequel to Punching the Clown. From 2016 to 2019, he had a recurring supporting role as John Stafford in Silicon Valley. In 2018, he directed My First Comedy Special. The film was produced by Big Ugly Laugh Productions, LLC, and stars Grey Griffin.

Phillips's several web series include "Henry's Kitchen", "The Loner" for IFC, "Loser", and "The Highway Man", a Patreon series. He has also appeared on Jimmy Kimmel Live!.

Phillips has said he would not be doing stand-up comedy if not for Doug Stanhope. He also appears on Stanhope's 2000 album Something to Take the Edge Off.

=== Cooking ===
Phillips holds a strong presence as a comical cook. He creates cooking content via Twitch and his satirical YouTube and Patreon web series "Henry's Kitchen", a cooking show where Henry gives lessons whilst being comically inept at his work. "Henry's Kitchen" has been praised by critics. Writer David Britton states "[only] a true genius could purposely edit something this poorly." Jenn Harris from the Los Angeles Times describes one episode as "amazing". Gabe Dunn in 2013 said, "Is it parody or just plain weird? It's hard to tell, but you'll laugh either way." From September to November 2018, Phillips hosted Henry's Kitchen: Masterclass, a cooking show produced by Thrillist. Many of his videos' montages feature songs from his parody character, José Suicidio. He is also the author of two cookbooks. Henry also performs "Henry's Kitchen" live on Twitch.

=== Neither Here Nor There ===
In 2014, Phillips performed his hour-long debut comedy special Neither Here Nor There at the Lyric Theatre in Los Angeles. It was directed by Steven Feinartz and produced by United Comedy LLC. The show featured Mark Cohen, Audrey Tess, Brendon Walsh, and Todd Glass. The show released exclusively on Vimeo on Demand on August 15, 2016, and released as an album on August 19, 2016.

In 2026, the special and album were re-released by Blonde Medicine.

== Style ==
Phillips does folk-style and comedy music. His albums feature a mix of live tracks and studio recordings. He is often compared to Tom Lehrer, a musical satirist known for his humorous songs.

Phillips typically portrays a classic loser character who is hapless with women and unsuccessful in show business. His musical style is frequently in ballad form where the sincerity of the musical style contrasts with the sad or angry lyrics which become comically absurd as the song progresses. He has produced music under the alias José Suicidio, a satirical character.

Graham Reid describes some of Phillips' humor as "wickedly funny" whilst "very close to being offensive".

== Discography ==
- On the Shoulders of Freaks (1997)
- Number 2 (1999)
- Why Haven't I Heard from You (2005)
- L.A. Dream (2010)
- Neither Here nor There (2016)

As José Suicidio:

- Let's Get Suicidal (2013)
- There's Something Wrong With Me (2026)

== Filmography ==
The following films and television shows were directed or written by Phillips:

=== Film ===
- Punching the Clown (2009)
- Punching Henry (2016)
- My First Comedy Special (2018)

=== Television ===
- You and Your Fu*king Coffee (2013–)
- Silicon Valley (2016-2019)
