= Punching the Clown =

- Directed by: Gregori Viens
- Written by: Gregori Viens, Henry Phillps
- Produced by: Dave Klein, Eric Klein
- Starring: Henry Phillips; Ellen Ratner; Matthew Walker; Audrey Siegel; Mark Cohen; Michelle Anne Johnson; Rick Batalla
- Cinematography: Ian Campbell
- Release dates: January 17, 2009 (Slamdance Film Festival); October 2010 (United States)
- Running time: 91 minutes
- Country: United States
- Language: English

Punching the Clown is a 2009 American comedy film directed by Gregori Viens and starring Henry Phillips as a semi-fictionalized version of himself.

== Premise ==
Henry (Phillips) is a struggling singer-songwriter comic in Los Angeles who suddenly finds success and then is subjected to the cruelty of show business.

== Production ==
The film includes both scripted scenes as well as portions of actual live performances by Phillips.

== Reception ==
Punching the Clown has been received positively by critics and holds an 87% rating on Rotten Tomatoes. The film also won the Audience Award at the 2009 Slamdance Film Festival.
