= Aqua discography =

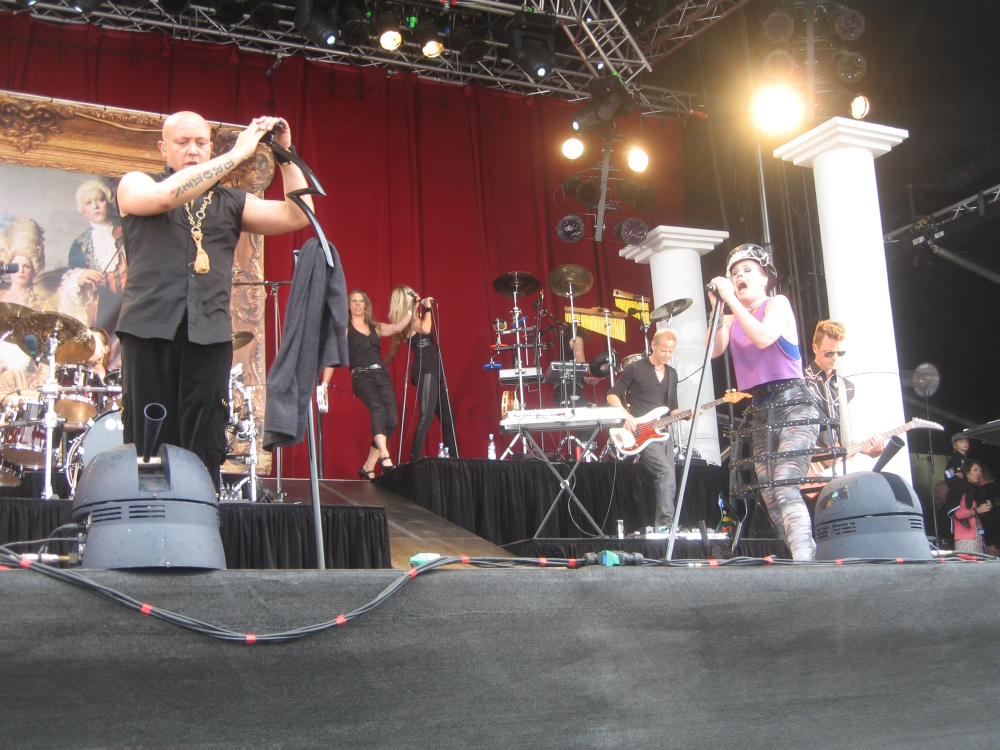
- Aqua performing live in 2009. From left to right: René Dif, Lene Nystrøm and Claus Norreen
- Studio albums: 3
- Compilation albums: 2
- Singles: 22
- Video albums: 7
- Music videos: 22
- Remix albums: 3

The discography of Aqua, a Danish-Norwegian dance-pop group, contains three studio albums, two compilation albums, three remix albums and 22 singles.

== Albums ==
=== Studio albums ===
List of albums, with selected chart positions and certifications
Title	Album details	Peak chart positions										Sales	Certifications
Title	Album details	DEN	AUS	CAN	GER	NZ	NOR	SWE	SWI	UK	US	Sales	Certifications
Aquarium	Released: 26 March 1997; Label: Universal (#85020); Formats: LP, CD, cassette	1	1	1	6	1	1	1	3	6	7	WW: 14,000,000; CAN: 1,083,000; UK: 565,000	DEN: 14× Platinum; AUS: 6× Platinum; CAN: Diamond; GER: Gold; NZ: Platinum; NOR: 4× Platinum; SWE: 5× Platinum; SWI: Gold; UK: Platinum; US: 3× Platinum
Aquarius	Released: 28 February 2000; Label: Universal (#1538102); Formats: LP, CD, cassette	1	15	3	16	8	1	2	8	24	82	WW: 4,000,000; UK: 35,000	DEN: 4× Platinum; AUS: Gold; CAN: 2× Platinum; NOR: 2× Platinum; SWE: Platinum; SWI: Gold
Megalomania	Released: 3 October 2011; Label: Universal; Formats: CD, digital download	2	154	—	—	—	—	—	—	—	—		DEN: Gold
"—" denotes items that did not chart or were not released.

=== Compilation albums ===
Title	Album details	Peak chart positions					Certifications
Title	Album details	DEN	JPN	NOR	SWE	UK	Certifications
Cartoon Heroes: The Best of Aqua	Released: 22 May 2002; Label: Universal (#UICY-1101); Formats: CD, cassette	—	12	—	—	—	
Greatest Hits	Released: 15 June 2009; Label: Universal (#2706310); Formats: CD, digital download	1	—	7	24	135	DEN: 2× Platinum; NOR: Gold
"—" denotes releases that did not chart.

=== Remix albums ===
Title	Album details	Peak chart positions					Certifications
Title	Album details	DEN	AUS	NOR	NZ	SWE	Certifications
Bubble Mix (The Ultimate Aquarium Remixes Album)	Released: 11 March 1998; Label: Universal; Format: CD, cassette	—	52	—	36	—	
Aqua Mania Remix	Released: 25 June 1998; Label: Universal; Format: CD, cassette	25	—	4	—	31	NOR: Gold
Remix Super Best	Released: December 2002; Label: Universal; Format: CD, cassette	—	—	—	—	—	
"—" denotes releases that did not chart.

== Singles ==
=== As main artist ===
List of singles, with selected chart positions
Title	Year	Peak chart positions										Certifications	Album
Title	Year	DEN	AUS	GER	NLD	NZ	NOR	SWE	SWI	UK	US	Certifications	Album
"Itzy Bitzy Spider" (as Joyspeed)	1995	—	—	—	—	—	—	—	—	—	—		Non-album single
"Roses Are Red"	1996	1	—	—	—	—	2	5	—	—	—	DEN: Platinum; NOR: Gold; SWE: Gold	Aquarium
"My Oh My"	1997	1	56	12	12	12	20	4	12	6	—	DEN: Gold	Aquarium
"Barbie Girl"	1997	2	1	1	1	1	1	1	1	1	7	AUS: 3× Platinum; GER: Platinum; NOR: 2× Platinum; SWE: 3× Platinum; SWI: Platinum; UK: 4× Platinum; US: 3× Platinum	Aquarium
"Doctor Jones"	1997	1	1	7	3	2	1	2	11	1	—	AUS: 3× Platinum; GER: Gold; SWE: Platinum; UK: Platinum	Aquarium
"Lollipop (Candyman)"	1997	—	3	—	—	22	—	10	—	—	23	AUS: Platinum	Aquarium
"Turn Back Time"	1998	16	10	42	18	2	—	4	26	1	—	AUS: Gold; SWE: Gold; UK: Silver	Aquarium
"Good Morning Sunshine"	1998	25	—	94	80	—	—	—	—	18	—		Aquarium
"Cartoon Heroes"	2000	1	16	13	35	6	1	2	11	7	—	DEN: 4× Platinum; AUS: Gold; NZ: Gold; NOR: Gold; SWE: Platinum	Aquarius
"Around the World"	2000	1	35	56	44	—	16	4	42	26	—	SWE: Gold	Aquarius
"Bumble Bees"	2000	6	65	96	—	—	—	34	—	—	—		Aquarius
"We Belong to the Sea"	2001	19	—	—	—	—	—	—	—	—	—		Aquarius
"Back to the 80s"	2009	1	122	—	—	—	3	25	—	—	—	DEN: Platinum; NOR: Platinum	Greatest Hits
"My Mamma Said"	2009	4	—	—	—	—	—	—	—	—	—	DEN: Gold	Greatest Hits
"Spin Me a Christmas"	2009	43	—	—	—	—	—	—	—	—	—		Greatest Hits (Special edition)
"How R U Doin?"	2011	4	—	—	—	—	6	—	—	—	—	DEN: Gold	Megalomania
"Playmate to Jesus"	2011	13	—	—	—	—	—	—	—	—	—	DEN: Gold	Megalomania
"Like a Robot"	2012	—	—	—	—	—	—	—	—	—	—		Megalomania
"Freaky Friday"	2017	—	—	—	—	—	—	—	—	—	—		Non-album singles
"Rookie"	2018	—	—	—	—	—	—	—	—	—	—		Non-album singles
"I Am What I Am"	2021	—	—	—	—	—	—	—	—	—	—		Non-album singles
"Barbie World" (with Nicki Minaj and Ice Spice)	2023	9	3	10	44	3	8	9	8	4	7	AUS: Platinum	Barbie the Album
"—" denotes releases that did not chart or were not released in that territory.

=== As featured artist ===
Title	Year	Peak chart positions	Album
Title	Year	DEN	Album
"Selv En Dråbe" (among various artists)	1999	1	Grænseløs Greatest
"Hvor Små Vi Er" (among Giv Til Asien artists)	2005	1	Non-album single

=== Other charted songs ===
Title	Year	Peak chart positions	Album
Title	Year	DEN	Album
"Live Fast – Die Young"	2009	24	Greatest Hits

== Video albums ==
Title	Album details	Notes
Aqua: The Videos	Released: 1997; Label: Universal; Formats: VHS	Contains the music videos for Aqua's first singles.
Around the World	Released: 1997; Label: Universal; Formats: VHS	Includes an exclusive promotional single of their B-side "Didn't I". Contains the music videos for Aqua's first singles.
The Aqua Diary	Released: 1998; Label: Universal; Formats: VHS, V-CD	Contains exclusive behind the scenes footage, a documentary and the music videos for Aqua's first singles.
The Video and Karaoke	Released: 2000; Label: Universal; Formats: DVD, VHS	Released only in Japan.
Aqua: The Video Collection	Released: 2000; Label: Universal; Formats: DVD, VHS	Contains behind the scenes footage and music videos for all Aqua singles from their first two albums Aquarium and Aquarius except "We Belong to the Sea".
The Hits Karaoke	Released: 2001; Label: Universal; Formats: V-CD	Contains karaoke music videos for all Aqua singles from their first two albums Aquarium and Aquarius except "We Belong to the Sea". It includes an exclusive music video for the song Aquarius, available only on this item to date.
Greatest Hits (Special Edition)	Released: 16 November 2009; Label: Universal; Formats: DVD	Featured on the special edition of Aqua's Greatest Hits CD and contains a live concert recording from Tivoli Gardens in Copenhagen. One of the songs presented there is the previously unreleased song "Shakin' Stevens", the demo version of their song "Sucker for a Superstar" from their album Megalomania.

== Music videos ==
=== 1990s ===
Year	Title	Director(s)	Notes
1996	"Roses Are Red"	Christian Bjarke Dyekjær, Peter Hiort	Aqua is singing in a simple white box, supposed to be in the bottle, while in the second scene are two boring guys on a party drinking "Aqua" and get into party animals at the end of the video. The directors are Aqua's close friends.
1997	"Barbie Girl"	Peder Pedersen, Peter Stenbæk	Lene is playing the doll Barbie and René Dif the doll Ken Carson just parodying the characters being so plastic. At the end of the video it turned to a party with two other dolls similar to Aqua's most other early music videos. The shoot was in Denmark.
1997	"Doctor Jones"	Peter Stenbæk	The video and song is loosely based around the title character of the film series, with René Dif playing Doctor Jones and rescuing his fellow band members from a stereotypical voodoo tribe. The shoot was in Denmark.
1997	"Lollipop (Candyman)"	Peder Pedersen, Peter Stenbæk	Aqua are in outer space, a similar to their later music video "Cartoon heroes", just more cartoon-ish and includes a fight against aliens, where a small robot called "C.A.N.D.Y." is helping Aqua and saving the day.
1998	"My Oh My"	Peder Pedersen, Peter Stenbæk	The video features Aqua on a pirate ship, with Lene being captured by the three male members, who are playing pirates before turning the tables around and taking over. They then go on to discover treasure.
1998	"Turn Back Time"	Peter Stenbæk	It contains scenes from the Sliding Doors film and was different from the previous comedy videos. There are two edits of this video, which was filmed on the abandoned Platform 5 at Holborn tube station in the UK, the only place where filming is allowed.
1998	"Good Morning Sunshine"	Unknown	An Arabic flavoured "Good morning sunshine" live performance including different behind the scenes footage from their tour. The song was live released as well.
1999	"Selv En Dråbe"	Unknown	Charity music video and song featuring various artists. Lene is singing a verse, René Dif is part of the raps and in a few sequents you can see Claus and Søren.

=== 2000s ===
Year	Title	Director(s)	Notes
2000	"Cartoon Heroes"	Tomáš Mašín	It featured the world in help, who called and re-animated Aqua as heroes in the outer space, saving the globe from a big octopus, which is destroying world capitals. It's the most expensive Aqua video ever and more serious than their "Lollipop (Candyman)" space themed video. There are two slightly different video cuts released.
2000	"Around the World"	Ronnie West, Peter Stenbæk	The video also has a more serious style, but still a parody of the movie Entrapment. The video featured the members of the band planning a big coup just for fun, a robbery in the night, which ended up with stealing a main valuable diamond for their Aquarium.
2000	"Around the World" (Version 2)	Tomáš Mašín	Remains unreleased. You can see Aqua sitting relaxed on the couch and switching the channels of the world like homeshopping channels, soccer games, cooking shows and news, all portrayed by themselves, until they fall asleep at the end of the video. Pieces of the music video can be seen in the Turn Back Time documentary in 2005.
2000	"Bumble Bees"	Ronnie West, Peder Pedersen, Peter Stenbæk	The video parodied the groups status as a "Barbie band", gained due to the success of their hit "Barbie Girl", with Aqua trying to make a good music video, they made three videos, but being hampered by a poor director, a low-budget and faulty equipment.
2001	"We Belong to the Sea"	Toby Hooper	Lene is stealing René Dif in the form of a goldfish, and later releasing him into the wide open sea. A shark fin then appears in the water, implying Rene's death and possibly also that of Aqua as a music group and the fight between Lene and René. The video had been shot in Spain.
2001	"Aquarius"	Unknown	Looks like a typical goodbye video featuring clips from all of their music videos, live performances, bonus candid material and never seen before behind the scenes footage similar to their "Good Morning Sunshine" music video to end up a chapter. It can be found only on The Hits: Karaoke Videos CD.
2007	"Centerpubben"	Michael Christensen	Black and white Hej Matematik music video, which features a cameo appearance of Aqua as "Centerpubben" in a shopping window. The video is directed by Michael Christensen for Gaucho Film.
2008	"Goodbye to the Circus"	Unknown	Remains unreleased and has been exclusively recorded for their comeback live shows. Aqua are dressed like sad clowns singing the song in close ups in front of a black background. The video has been shown numerous times in the background of their live shows while performing this song.
2009	"Back to the 80s"	Peter Stenbæk	Aqua's first music video after almost nine years. They're wearing 80's clothes and long wigs like old rockstars, which fit perfectly to the message of the song. There are two slightly different video cuts released due to the changed line from "When Michael Jackson's skin was black" to "When Arnie told us 'I'll be back'".
2009	"My Mamma Said"	Rasmus Laumann	Aqua's darkest and most serious video in their career, which has been released on 26 October 2009. Aqua are all in black, sitting around a table. Everything there like flowers etc., except the flesh, is in black and white.
2009	"Spin Me a Christmas"	Peter Stenbæk	Aqua's back to their roots of funny and cheesy, but also cartoonish and colorful videos, released on 30 November 2009. Aqua visiting René as drunken Santa Claus, receiving gifts from him and having a fun time in a plastic winter wonderland.

=== 2010s ===
Year	Title	Director(s)	Notes
2011	"How R U Doin'?"	Rasmus Laumann	It starts with Aqua walking towards the camera with the words "How R U doin'?" appearing in beat with the music. René and Lene are then driving white trucks throughout a dirty, post-apocalyptic cartoonish environment with Søren and Claus as passengers, respectively. After doing jumps, maneuvering through explosions and crashing into various objects, the group walks away from the trucks with the words "How R U Doin'?" appearing again.
2011	"Playmate to Jesus"	Michael Christensen	A serious arty music video in decent colors. Aqua are in an empty left mansion, reminiscent of a horror film, wearing black and gray clothing and following a black something in form of a cloud, which wonders through the halls of the house. At the end it escapes through the roof, transforming into a beam, to heaven at the end of the video.
2018	"Rookie"	Nikolaj Gyldenløve	Aqua during a concert tour, before, during and after concerts.
