= Hej Matematik discography =

- Studio albums: 2
- Singles: 18
- Music videos: 17
- Promotional singles: 4
- EP: 2

The discography of Hej Matematik, a Danish pop band, consists of 2 studio albums, 2 extended plays, 18 singles, including 2 as featured artist and 4 promotional singles, and 17 music videos, including 2 as featured artist. Hej Matematik was first featured on singles by Danish band TV-2 before releasing their debut studio album Vi burde ses noget mere in 2008, preceded by the two single releases "Gymnastik" and "Centerpubben" in 2007. This success was followed with the sophomore release Alt går op i 6 in 2010.

== Albums ==
=== Studio albums ===
List of albums, with selected chart positions, sales figures and certifications
Title	Album details	Peak position	Certification
Title	Album details	DAN	Certification
Vi burde ses noget mere	Released: February 4, 2008; Label: Copenhagen Records; Formats: CD, digital download	4	Platinum
Alt går op i 6	Released: January 25, 2010; Label: Copenhagen Records; Formats: CD, digital download	5	Platinum
"—" denotes album which were not released in that country or failed to chart.

=== Extended plays ===
List of extended plays, with selected chart positions
Title	Album details	Peak position
Title	Album details	DAN
Hej lights 2012	Released: March 18, 2013; Label: ArtPeople; Formats: digital download	—
Selvfed	Released: March 23, 2015; Label: Sony Music; Formats: digital download	—
"—" denotes extended play which were not released in that country or failed to chart.

== Singles ==
List of singles, with selected chart positions and certifications
Title	Year	Peak position	Certification	Album
Title	Year	DEN	Certification	Album
"Gymnastik"	2007	—		Vi burde ses noget mere
"Centerpubben"	2007	22		Vi burde ses noget mere
"Du & jeg"	2008	32		Vi burde ses noget mere
"Walkmand" (Studio/Live Version)^{[A]}	2008	3	2× Platinum	Vi burde ses noget mere (Special Edition)
"Party i provinsen"	2009	2	Platinum	Alt går op i 6
"Legendebørn"	2010	—		Alt går op i 6
"Maskinerne" (Kato Remix)^{[B]} (Released as "Kato På Maskinerne")	2010	38		Alt går op i 6
"Livet i plastik"	2012	—		Hej lights 2012
"Sikke en fest (Så da bas)"	2012	—		Hej lights 2012
"Ik ordinær" (featuring Jesper Binzer)	2014	—		Selvfed
"Cykler uden hænder"	2015	—		Selvfed
"København"	2015	—		Selvfed
"—" denotes single that did not chart or was not released.

=== Promotional singles ===
List of singles, with selected chart positions and certifications
Title	Year	Peak position	Certification	Album
Title	Year	DEN	Certification	Album
"Vi ka' alt vi to" (featuring Lene) (Uncredited)	2008	—		Vi burde ses noget mere
"Hej Matematik"	2008	—		Vi burde ses noget mere
"The loser sign"^{[D]}	2011	—		Non-album single
"Det blir en go dag" (featuring Ankerstjerne)	2012	39		Hej lights 2012
"Partyboy"	2013	—		Hej lights 2012
"—" denotes single that did not chart or was not released.

=== Featured singles ===
List of singles, with selected chart positions and certifications
Title	Year	Peak position	Certification	Album
Title	Year	DEN	Certification	Album
"S.O.M.M.E.R." (TV-2 featuring Hej Matematik) (Uncredited)^{[C]}	2007	—		For dig ku' jeg gøre alting
"Randers station" (TV-2 featuring Hej Matematik) (Uncredited)^{[C]}	2007	—		For dig ku' jeg gøre alting
"—" denotes single that did not chart or was not released.

== Music videos ==
Year	Song	Director(s)	Note(s)
2007	"Gymnastik"	Søren Rasted	The music video is similar to Søren Rasted's previous solo project music videos as LazyB, also directed by himself. There are two versions of the video. First version consists of a man dressed in gym clothes, working out in several places around Copenhagen, such as inside a bus, a public market, a square, etc. Second version consists of an Arirang Festival video, cut by several scenes of Hej Matematik singing in a violet background.
2007	"Centerpubben"	Michael Christensen	Hej Matematik is walking barefoot in a mall. There is also a couple scenes of them inside a men's restroom, as well as several scenes of Nicolaj reading the newspaper while browsing the stores. Søren Rasted's fellow band members of Aqua appear in this music video, who were reunited in a music video for the first time since their sudden split in 2001.
2008	"Du & jeg"	Sidse Carstens & Kim Høgh	A woman is trying to get the attention of Hej Matematik by chasing them, and trying to reach them on their phones. Some parts of the music video had been recorded in reverse.
2008	"Høj 5"	Simon Fensholm	Fensholm was the winner of the "Høj 5" video fan contest that Hej Matematik started in 2008 in Denmark. The video consists of two men drawing on a giant cardboard several items such as a cellphone in flames, a car, Hej Matematik's logo, and several "5", while rearranging several music cassettes. Hej Matematik do not appear in this video.
2008	"Walkmand"	Various	The footage has been recorded during Hej Matematik's 2008 tour turned into the half live, half studio version "Walkmand" music video. It features a cameo appearance of Søren Rasted's wife and fellow Aqua band member Lene.
2010	"Party i provinsen"	Michael Christensen	People are dancing to the sound until it's getting late in form of a white, blue, and red lighted club.
2010	"Legendebørn"	Michael Christensen	Hej Matematik attending in the video with television heads, watching out of a stylish house and remembering the good old childhood time playing around.
2010	"Maskinerne (Kato Remix)" (Released as "Kato På Maskinerne")	Michael Christensen	Two gangs are fighting against each other, while Hej Matematik are watching them in monitors as machines. Kato, who mixed the remix, also appears in the music video.
2011	"The Loser Sign"	Various	The footage video has been exclusively released and promoted through the Danish TV show "Natholdet". Fans were able to send in a clip of themselves, presenting a loser sign resulting in a clip music video.
2012	"Livet I Plastik"	—	Hej Matematik in a simple music video recorded in their recording studio with their live band. At the end of the music video they are inside giant plastic bubbles.
2012	"Sikke En Fest (Så Da Bas)"	—	Søren and Nicolaj Rasted are driving through places such as the city on a sunny day. At the end they are jumping naked into the sea.
2014	"Ik ordinær"	Søren Rasted	In the night, Søren and Nicolaj, along with guest vocalist Jesper Binzer, are driving with a car through the streets of Denmark. Once in a while they are catching up some passengers. It features Søren's wife Lene as a passenger in a cameo appearance.
2015	"Cykler Uden Hænder"	Julias Moon	Simple performance video in a dark lighted black studio. The video has been recorded and produced at DR's Output Live Session in P3 in one take along with the song "København".
2015	"København"	Julias Moon	Simple performance video in a dark lighted black studio. The video has been recorded and produced at DR's Output Live Session in P3 in one take along with the song "Cykler uden hænder".

=== Featured music videos ===
Year	Song	Director(s)	Note(s)
2007	"S.O.M.M.E.R."	—	First single's music video by TV-2 featuring an uncredited performance by Hej Matematik on backing vocals. Hej Matematik are not appearing in the music video.
2007	"Randers station"	—	Second single's music video by TV-2 featuring an uncredited performance by Hej Matematik on backing vocals. Hej Matematik are not appearing in the music video.
2008	"Secret of the state"	Wayne Coyne	Hej Matematik made a cameo appearance in this music video by The William Blakes.

== Notes ==
A The song of "Walkmand" was released as a part studio, part live version.
B "Maskinerne" was released as a remix version titled "Kato på Maskinerne" mixed by Kato.
C Hej Matematik provided backing vocals on the almost entire album "For dig ku' jeg gøre alting".
D "The loser sign" was exclusively released over the show "Natholdet".
