= Aqua: The Video Collection =

Video by Aqua
- Released: December 20, 2000
- Recorded: 1996–2000
- Genres: Dance-pop, Eurodance
- Length: 76 minutes
- Label: Universal Music Denmark
- Director: Peder Pedersen

Aqua chronology
Aqua: The Videos (1998)	Aqua: The Video Collection (2000)

Aqua: The Video Collection is a video album/documentary film by the Danish-Norwegian dance-pop group, Aqua, released in 2000. It includes all of the band's videos from the period 1996–2000 and most of the videos made for the singles from their first two studio albums.

== Track listing ==
- "Roses Are Red"
- "Barbie Girl"
- "Doctor Jones"
- "Lollipop"
- "My Oh My"
- "Turn Back Time"
- "Good Morning Sunshine"
- "Cartoon Heroes"
- "Around the World"
- "Bumble Bees"
- Behind the Scenes
- Karaoke
- Photo gallery

== Personnel ==
- Lene Nystrom Rasted – female vocals
- Rene Dif – male vocals
- Søren Rasted – keyboard, guitar
- Claus Norreen – keyboard
