= Cartoon Heroes: The Best of Aqua =

Greatest hits album by Aqua
- Released: 22 May 2002
- Recorded: 1996–2000
- Genre: Bubblegum pop; eurodance
- Length: 60:24
- Label: MCA
- Producer: Søren Nystrøm Rasted; Claus Norreen

Aqua chronology
Aquarius (2000)	Cartoon Heroes: The Best of Aqua (2002)	Greatest Hits (2009)

Cartoon Heroes: The Best of Aqua is a greatest hits album by the Danish-Norwegian dance-pop group Aqua. It was released solely in Japan on 22 May 2002.

== Album information ==
The set includes most of the hit singles that Aqua released, with the excised singles being "We Belong to the Sea", "Good Morning Sunshine", and the Scandinavian promotional single released with the documentary Around the World, "Didn't I".

The album also includes four songs that were not released as singles, "Back from Mars", "An Apple a Day", "Calling You" and "Halloween". There is a remix of "Cartoon Heroes" as well as two music videos.

== Track listing ==
No.	Title	Writer(s)	Producer(s)	Length
1.	"Cartoon Heroes" (from Aquarius, 2000)	Søren Rasted; Claus Norreen	Rasted; Norreen	3:41
2.	"Freaky Friday" (from Aquarius, 2000)	Rasted; Norreen	Rasted; Norreen	3:45
3.	"Barbie Girl" (from Aquarium, 1997)	Rasted; Norreen; René Dif	Johnny Jam; Delgado; Rasted; Norreen	3:15
4.	"Roses Are Red" (from Aquarium, 1997)	Rasted; Norreen; Dif; Lene Nystrøm; Peter Hartmann; Jan Langhoff	Hartmann & Langhoff	3:43
5.	"Bumble Bees" (from Aquarius, 2000)	Rasted; Norreen	Rasted; Norreen	3:52
6.	"Doctor Jones" (from Aquarium, 1997)	Anders Øland; Rasted; Norreen; Dif	Jam; Delgado; Rasted; Norreen	3:22
7.	"Around the World" (from Aquarius, 2000)	Rasted; Norreen	Rasted; Norreen	3:28
8.	"Lollipop (Candyman)" (from Aquarium, 1997)	Rasted; Norreen; Nystrøm; Dif; Hartmann; Langhoff	Jam; Delgado; Rasted; Norreen	3:35
9.	"Back from Mars" (from Aquarius, 2000)	Rasted; Norreen	Rasted; Norreen	4:02
10.	"Happy Boys & Girls" (from Aquarium, 1997)	Rasted; Norreen; Dif; Nystrøm	Jam; Delgado; Rasted; Norreen	3:34
11.	"My Oh My" (from Aquarium, 1997)	Rasted; Norreen; Dif	Jam; Delgado; Rasted; Norreen	3:23
12.	"Halloween" (from Aquarius, 2000)	Rasted; Norreen; Dif	Rasted; Norreen	3:49
13.	"Calling You" (from Aquarium, 1997)	Rasted; Norreen; Dif; Hartmann; Langhoff	Jam; Delgado; Rasted; Norreen; Hartmann & Langhoff	3:31
14.	"An Apple a Day" (from Aquarius, 2000)	Rasted; Norreen	Rasted; Norreen	3:38
15.	"Turn Back Time" (from Aquarium, 1997)	Rasted; Norreen	Jam; Delgado; Rasted; Norreen	4:07
16.	"Cartoon Heroes" (Hampenberg Remix)	Rasted; Norreen	Rasted; Norreen; Morten Hampenberg; Thomas Salling	5:41

Music videos
No.	Title	Director(s)	Length
1.	"Cartoon Heroes"	Thomas Masin	4:19
2.	"Around the World"	Peter Stenbæk; Ronnie West	3:31

== Chart positions ==
Chart (2002)	Peak position
Japanese Albums (Oricon)	12

== Certifications ==
Region	Certification	Certified units/sales
Japan (RIAJ)	Gold	100,000^{^}
^{^} Shipments figures based on certification alone.
