= Back to the 80s =

Back to the 80s may refer to:

- Back to the 80s (musical), a 2004 stage musical
- "Back to the 80s" (song), a song by Aqua
