= Megalomania (Aqua album) =

Studio album by Aqua
- Released: 3 October 2011
- Recorded: 2010–2011
- Studio: Electron Studios (Copenhagen)
- Genre: Dance-pop; pop rock
- Length: 39:09
- Label: Universal; WaterWorks
- Producer: Kasper Bjørke; Claus Norreen; Nicolaj Rasted; Søren Rasted; Lucas Secon; Frederik Thaae; Thomas Troelsen

Aqua chronology
Greatest Hits (2009)	Megalomania (2011)

Singles from Megalomania
- 1. "How R U Doin?" Released: 14 March 2011; 2. "Playmate to Jesus" Released: 12 September 2011; 3. "Like a Robot" Released: January 2012

Megalomania is the third and final studio album by Danish band Aqua. It was released on 3 October 2011 by Universal Music Group and WaterWorks, over 11 years after the release of their second studio album, Aquarius (2000). The album peaked at number two in Denmark and was certified gold by the International Federation of the Phonographic Industry (IFPI).

== Background ==
After their split in 2001 Aqua announced their comeback on October 26, 2007, during a press conference. During the summer of 2008 Aqua played eight concerts in eight different cities as part of the one day music festival Grøn Koncert in Denmark. On 25 May 2009, they released their first single since 2001, "Back to the 80's" soon followed by the greatest hits album, Greatest Hits.

In February 2010 Aqua began working on their third studio album in Thailand. Instead of touring that year, the band focused on writing and producing the album with the desire to create the "world's best pop album". After 18 months of songwriting and more than 100 songs recorded, the band finished the album on 7 July 2011, after 12 months in the studio.

Aqua were originally set to release the album on 14 July 2011, however the release was pushed back to 5 September with the record label citing bad timing. On 22 August, Aqua announced that the album would finally be released on 3 October.

== Music and lyrics ==
The album shifts from a more bubblegum pop and eurodance style to a more mature electropop and dance-pop. Aqua member René Dif describes the album's differences as "incredible... it's a lot more aggressive and a lot more like full-on party dance music". The word "fuck" is used multiple times in the songs "Like a Robot" and "Sucker for a Superstar", and Dif says that the group was not concerned about it. Despite the explicit content and strong language in some songs, the album was not issued with a Parental Advisory warning, and therefore no edited alternative was made available.

== Critical reception ==
Professional ratings
Review scores
Source	Rating
AllMusic	2.5/5 stars
B.T.	2/6 stars
Ekstra Bladet	2/6 stars
Gaffa	4/6 stars
Jyllands-Posten	3/6 stars
Soundvenue	4/6 stars
Politiken	2/6 stars

Unlike their other albums, reviews for Megalomania were more mixed. A major criticism of the album was for its shift to a more mature album. One of these reviews came from Jon O'Brien of AllMusic, who gave the album two and a half stars out of five, writing: "Unsurprisingly, their previous squeaky, cartoonish pop sound is nowhere to be found on this record which, with its several expletive-laden lyrics and trashy electro production reveals a much more grown-up, if not necessarily mature, new direction. [...] They now sound like every other generic dance-pop outfit out there".

== Commercial performance ==
On 7 October 2011, the album debuted at number six, with sales of 1,615 copies after only three days of sale. The following week the album peaked at number two selling 2,282 copies. On 17 October 2011, the album was certified gold by the International Federation of the Phonographic Industry (IFPI) for shipments of 10,000 copies in Denmark. In its third week on the chart the album fell to number twelve, selling 751 copies. The album fell out of the chart after seven weeks in the top 40. In its final week on the chart, the album charted at number thirty-three with 287 copies sold. According to the band's manager Niclas Anker, the goal was to reach platinum certification for shipments of 20,000 copies. Despite the band's previous success in the United States, the album was not released on any physical or digital format in North America until 2020, when it was finally released on streaming services.

== Singles ==
"How R U Doin?" was released on 14 March 2011, as the lead single from the album. The song peaked at number four in Denmark, and it has since been certified gold by the International Federation of the Phonographic Industry (IFPI) for sales of 15,000 copies in Denmark.

During their 2011 tour the band confirmed that "Like a Robot" would be released as the album's second single in the beginning of July 2011, to coincide with the album release the same month. However, on 8 September 2011, it was announced that "Playmate to Jesus" and "Like a Robot" would be released as two separate singles, with "Like a Robot" being the club single and "Playmate to Jesus" serving as the radio single. Both songs were released on 12 September 2011. The official music video to "Playmate to Jesus" premiered on 23 September 2011. The song debuted at number twenty-six in Denmark. In its second week on the chart, "Playmate to Jesus" reached a peak position of number thirteen. The song has been certified gold in Denmark for being streamed 300,000 times.

"Like a Robot" was released as the third single in January 2012.

== Track listing ==
Megalomania track listing
No.	Title	Writer(s)	Producer(s)	Length
1.	"Playmate to Jesus"	Søren Rasted; Claus Norreen; René Dif; Lene Nystrøm	Norreen; S. Rasted; Nicolaj Rasted^{[a]}	4:46
2.	"Dirty Little Pop Song"	Kasper Bjørke; S. Rasted; Norreen; Sue Brask	Bjørke; Norreen; S. Rasted; N. Rasted^{[a]}	3:49
3.	"Kill Myself"	S. Rasted; Norreen; Nystrøm	Norreen; S. Rasted; N. Rasted^{[a]}	3:29
4.	"Like a Robot"	Lucas Secon; Dif; S. Rasted; Norreen	Secon; Norreen; S. Rasted; N. Rasted^{[a]}	3:39
5.	"Viva Las Vegas"	S. Rasted; Norreen; Brask	Norreen; S. Rasted; N. Rasted^{[a]}	3:23
6.	"No Party Patrol"	S. Rasted; Norreen; Brask; Niels Rahr	Norreen; S. Rasted; N. Rasted^{[a]}	3:21
7.	"Come n' Get It"	S. Rasted; Norreen	Norreen; S. Rasted; N. Rasted^{[a]}	3:24
8.	"Sucker for a Superstar"	S. Rasted; Norreen; Brask	Frederik Thaae; Norreen; S. Rasted; N. Rasted^{[a]}	3:19
9.	"Be My Saviour Tonight"	S. Rasted; Norreen; N. Rasted; Dif	Norreen; S. Rasted; N. Rasted^{[a]}	3:17
10.	"How R U Doin?"	Thomas Troelsen; S. Rasted; Norreen	Troelsen; Norreen; S. Rasted; N. Rasted^{[a]}	3:21
11.	"If the World Didn't Suck (We Would All Fall Off)"	S. Rasted; Norreen; Brask	Thaae; Norreen; S. Rasted; N. Rasted^{[a]}	3:21
Total length:				39:09

Notes

- ^{^[a]} signifies an additional producer

== Charts ==
=== Weekly charts ===
Weekly chart performance for Megalomania
Chart (2011)	Peak position
Australian Albums (ARIA)	154
Danish Albums (Hitlisten)	2
Danish Bit Albums (Hitlisten)	1

=== Year-end charts ===
Year-end chart performance for Megalomania
Chart (2011)	Position
Danish Albums Chart	64

== Certifications ==
Certifications for Megalomania
Region	Certification	Certified units/sales
Denmark (IFPI Danmark)	Gold	10,000^{^}
^{^} Shipments figures based on certification alone.

== Release history ==
Release formats for Megalomania
Country	Date	Format	Label
Australia	October 3, 2011	Digital download	Universal
Denmark	October 3, 2011	Digital download	Universal
Norway	October 3, 2011	Digital download	Universal
Sweden	October 3, 2011	Digital download	Universal
United Kingdom	October 3, 2011	Digital download	Universal
United States	October 3, 2011	Digital download	Mercury
Germany	October 18, 2011	CD	Universal
