= Hej Matematik =

Danish pop group

- Origin: Copenhagen, Denmark
- Genres: Europop, pop, dance
- Years active: 2005–present
- Labels: Copenhagen Records; ArtPeople; Labelland; Sony
- Members: Principal; Søren Rasted; Nicolaj Rasted Other; Nicholas Findsen (Bass); Nikolaj Teinvig (Guitar); Mads Storm (Keyboard); Peter Düring (Drums)

Hej Matematik (literally "Hi Mathematics") is a Danish pop group, consisting of Søren Rasted and his nephew Nicolaj Rasted. In live shows, they are accompanied by Nikolaj Teinvig on guitar, Nicholas Findsen on bass, Mads Storm on keyboards and Peter Düring on drums.

== History ==
=== 2005–08: Formation and Vi burde ses noget mere ===
Hej Matematik was founded in 2005 by Aqua member Søren Rasted and his nephew Nicolaj Rasted during Aqua's and Søren's own solo projects' LazyB hiatus. In 2007, Hej Matematik provided backing vocals on TV-2's album For dig ku' jeg gøre alting. The group's own debut album was Vi burde ses noget mere, released in 2008, preceded by the two single releases "Gymnastik" and "Centerpubben" in 2007. The album peaked #4 in the Danish album chart, while "Centerpubben" became a moderate success, peaking #22 in the Danish single chart. The music video for "Centerpubben" is known for having Søren's fellow band members of Aqua on board, who were reunited in a music video for the first time since their sudden split in 2001. In 2008, the two more singles "Du & jeg", peaking #32 in the Danish single chart, and the promotional single "Vi ka' alt vi to", a ballad featuring an uncredited vocal performance by Søren's fellow Aqua-bandmember and wife Lene. In 2008, the single "Walkmand", which features a vocal sample by Michael Hardinger from his 1981s recording "Walk, Mand", has been released. Due to the huge success of "Walkmand", which made it to #3 in the Danish single chart and won the Danish "Hit of the Year" at Zulu Awards 2009, an annual award-ceremony held by Denmark's largest commercial television station TV 2, the 11-track debut album has been re-released in a special edition with "Walkmand" as a bonus track in the 12th place.

=== 2009–11: Alt går op i 6 ===
Hej Matematik's release of "Party i provinsen", the 2009 lead single of their up-and-coming second album, proved to be successful and reached #2 in the Danish single chart. The second studio album Alt går op i 6, released on 25 January 2010, became a similar success, reaching platinum status and peaking #5 in the Danish album chart. Alt går op i 6 produced two follow up singles "Legendebørn" and "Maskinerne", both released in 2010, with the latter mentioned being extra remixed by the Danish DJ Kato for the single release. "Maskinerne", labelled "Kato på Maskinerne" on the single, became a minor success peaking #38 in the Danish single chart. In 2011, a promotional single-only "The loser sign", has been exclusively released and promoted through the Danish TV show "Natholdet". For the song's music video, fans were invited to send in a clip of themselves, presenting a loser sign resulting in a clip music video. "The loser sign" is also known for being the group's first release, not sung in Danish language, but completely in English, and the last release through Copenhagen Records.

=== 2012–13: Hej lights 2012 ===
With their new contract with ArtPeople and Labelland, in 2012, the two singles "Livet i plastik", "Sikke en fest (Så da bas)" and the promotional single "Det blir en go dag", featuring Danish rapper Ankerstjerne, have been released. While "Livet i plastik"'s lyrics make a reference to the infamous "Life in plastic, it's fantastic"-phrase of Aqua's hit "Barbie Girl", "Sikke en fest (Så da bas)" heavily samples Johnny Reimar's "Sikken fest" and Gunnar Nu Hansen's "Så der bas". On 18 March 2013 the band's first extended play, titled Hej lights 2012, has been released, along with the single "Partyboy" to promote the EP. None of these album and single releases did chart, except the promotional single "Det blir en go dag", peaking #39 at the Danish single chart respectively and Hej Matematik parted ways with ArtPeople and Labelland.

=== 2014–present: Selvfed ===
Now signed at Sony, Hej Matematik released the first single from their upcoming release, called "Ik ordinær", in 2014. The song features guest vocals from the Danish band D-A-D's lead singer Jesper Binzer. In 2015, the singles "Cykler uden hænder" and "København", an Ulige Numre cover version, followed, along with the group's second extended play, titled Selvfed. None of these album and single releases did chart. Søren and Nicolaj made a guest appearance in the Danish comedy show Ditte & Louise as themselves.

== Discography ==
- Vi burde ses noget mere (2008)
- Alt går op i 6 (2010)

== Filmography ==
- Ditte & Louise (2015)
