= Lene =

Lene is a feminine given name common in Denmark and Norway.

== People called Lene ==
- Lene Alexandra, Norwegian singer
- Lene Demsitz, Danish long jumper
- Lene Elise Bergum, Norwegian actress
- Lene Brøndum, Danish actress
- Lene Espersen, Danish politician
- Lene Hall, Barbadian model
- Lene Hau, Danish physicist
- Lene Kaaberbøl, Danish writer
- Lene Køppen, Danish badminton player
- Lene Lovich, Serbian-American singer
- Lene Løseth, Norwegian alpine skier
- Lene Marlin, Norwegian singer
- Lene Mørk (born 1979), Danish badminton player
- Lene Nystrøm Rasted, Norwegian singer with pop group Aqua
- Lene Thiesen, Danish theatrist
- Lene Moyell Johansen, High commissioner of the Faroe Islands

== Other uses ==
- Lene Marie, a ketch-rigged tall ship built in Denmark in 1910
