= Nicolaj Rasted =

Nicolaj Bredkjær Rasted
- Born: Nicolaj Bredkjær Rasted; 5 August 1985 (age 40)
- Origin: Denmark
- Genres: Pop
- Occupations: Musician, producer
- Instruments: Keyboard, vocals
- Years active: 2004–present

Nicolaj Bredkjær Rasted (born 5 August 1985) is a Danish musician, illustrator, and producer. He is a member of Hej Matematik.

== Early years ==
His musical career started in Spring 2006, when he started working at The Lobby Recording Studios in Denmark, owned by his uncle Søren Rasted and Claus Norreen, both members of Danish-Norwegian hit band Aqua. Nicolaj had started back then his studies in Audio Production, and started helping his uncle Søren with recording and productions of songs for several artists.

Nicolaj recorded background vocals, and later edited the song Disappear, by former German band No Angels. The song made it to Eurovision Song Contest 2008, ending up at #23 on the final chart.

He is also credited as an associate producer on Aqua's album Megalomania, and on Martin Hoberg Hedegaard debut album "Show the World". He has stated both on his Myspace/Facebook profile, as well as on several interviews that he's an atheist.

== Musical career ==
Nicolaj Rasted is a member of the Danish popduo Hej Matematik with his uncle Søren Rasted. Their No. 1 album "Vi Burde Ses Noget Mere" ("We should meet more often") includes hits like: "Gymnastik", "Centerpubben", "Du & Jeg" and "Walkmand". The song "Walkmand" was named the hit of the year at the 2008 Zulu Awards, going platinum in 2009. Hej Matematik was nominated for a number of awards at the Danish Music Awards and became one of the most sold Danish records of 2008.

Rasted's musical career began in Spring, 2006 when he started in the recording studio "The Lobby" which is jointly owned by Søren Rasted and Claus Norréen. Nicolaj Rasted was involved in recording the vocals for Disappear, which was performed by the German group No Angels at the Eurovision Song Contest 2008 in Belgrade, Serbia. Rasted also worked as a co-producer on a number of songs on the debut album of the Danish X-Factor winner, Martin.

Nicolaj Rasted is currently on tour with Hej Matematik. He also makes illustrations and drawings, which he shows on different social networks, before offering them for sale on his website.

== Discography ==
with Hej Matematik (2005–present)

2008 Vi Burde Ses Noget Mere
2008 Vi Burde Ses Noget Mere: Special Edition (Incl. 'Walkmand')
2010 Alt Går Op I 6
2013 Hej Lights 2012

== See also ==
- Hej Matematik
- Søren Rasted
