= Alt går op i 6 =

Studio album by Hej Matematik
- Released: 25 January 2010
- Recorded: 2009
- Genre: Pop, Europop
- Length: 42:15
- Label: Copenhagen Records
- Producer: Nicolaj Rasted, Søren Rasted

Hej Matematik chronology
Vi burde ses noget mere (2008)	Alt går op i 6 (2010)

Alt går op i 6 is the second studio album of the Danish pop duo Hej Matematik following the success of their debut album Vi burde ses noget mere. It was released on 25 January 2010 on Copenhagen Records and reached #5 on the Danish Albums Chart. The single "Party i provinsen" taken from the album was also a big success reaching #2 on the Danish Singles Chart.

== Track list ==
All lyrics were written by Søren Rasted, and the music composed by Nicolaj and Søren Rasted, except for "Weekend weekend" (lyrics, Nicolaj Rasted, Søren Rasted, music Nicolaj Rasted, Søren Rasted and Frederik Thaae) and "Det si'r sig selv" (lyrics and music by C.V. Jørgensen)

1. "Legendebørn" (3:32)
2. "Weekend weekend" (3:28)
3. "Alt går op i 6" (3:39)
4. "Party i provinsen" (3:30)
5. "Maskinerne" (2:56)
6. "Det si'r sig selv" (4:14)
7. "Walk in the Park" (4:16)
8. "Skabt til dig" (3:21)
9. "Ud i det fri" (2:59)
10. "Så ta'r vi toget" (2:54)
11. "Energi" (2:48)
12. "Lukketid" (4:34)

== Charts ==
Hitliste (2009)	Peak position	Certification
Danish Album Top-40	2	Platinum
