= Like a Robot =

Single by Aqua

from the album Megalomania
- Released: January 2012
- Recorded: 2011; Electron Studio (Copenhagen, Denmark)
- Genre: Dance-pop; electropop
- Length: 3:39
- Label: Universal
- Songwriters: Lucas Secon; René Dif; Søren Rasted; Claus Norreen
- Producers: Lucas Secon; Claus Norreen; Søren Rasted

Aqua singles chronology
"Playmate to Jesus" (2011)	"Like a Robot" (2012)	"Freaky Friday" (2017)

Audio video
- "Like a Robot" on YouTube

"Like a Robot" is a song from Danish-Norwegian pop band Aqua's third studio album, Megalomania. Initially released as a promotional single on 5 November 2011 producer Lucas Secon reported that "Like a Robot" would be released as the album's international lead single. and was released in Australia and New Zealand in January 2012. It was their first single to come with an "explicit language" warning, with band member René Dif saying: "There’s a million rappers out there who do that too."

== Reception ==
Scandipop reviewed the song as; "Amazing, Amazing, Amazing" They added, "...it’s them returning to the clubland from which they came. Squeaky voiced Lene laments a man’s shortcomings in the bedroom department"

Luis Gonzalez of Album Confessions said; “Like A Robot”, a raunchy song that ultimately deals with sex and alcohol. Aqua has forgotten all the past metaphors and innuendos and have decided to be up front with their naughty message. The production is great; the lyrics are fun and get lodged in your brain easily especially the golden chorus.

Jon O'Brien of Allmusic, in a review of Megalomania, said; ""Like a Robot" shows that the band's tongue-in-cheek innuendos have disappointingly been replaced by straightforward explicitness". "

Gaffa's Signe Bønsvig Wehding considered the song to be "among the best tracks on the album", along with "Playmate To Jesus", "Dirty Little Pop Song" and "Sucker For A Superstar"".

The Border Mail gave the album a negative review, but complimented "Like A Robot" for being 'punchy'.

== Track listing ==
- Digital download
1. "Like a Robot" – 3:39

== Credits ==
- Written by Lucas Secon, René Dif, Søren Rasted and Claus Norreen
- Produced by Lucas Secon, Søren Rasted and Claus Norreen

Credits adapted from album liner notes.

== Release history ==
Region	Date	Format	Label
Scandinavia	12 September 2011	Digital download	Universal Music
Australia	27 January 2012	Digital download	Universal Music
New Zealand	30 January 2012	Digital download	Universal Music

- Dates in Australian/New Zealand iTunes have reverted to Scandinavian release date.
