= My Mamma Said =

Single by Aqua

from the album Greatest Hits
- Released: November 2009
- Recorded: Elektron Studio
- Length: 3:37
- Label: Universal
- Songwriter(s): Søren Rasted; Lene Nystrøm
- Producer(s): Søren Rasted

Aqua singles chronology
"Back to the 80's" (2009)	"My Mamma Said" (2009)	"Spin Me a Christmas" (2009)

Music video
- "My Mamma Said" on YouTube

"My Mamma Said" is a song by Danish-Norwegian pop band Aqua. The song was written by members Søren Rasted and Lene Nystrøm, and produced by Rasted, for their second greatest hits album (2009). It was released as the second single from the album, following "Back to the 80's".

== Background and composition ==
“My Mamma Said" deals with emotions and considerations concerning the death of the narrator’s mother. The dominant instruments are the piano and the cello. Nystrøm is the principal vocalist and her part concerns fears and reflections about her mother, while Rene Dif's part pertains to philosophical and scientific aspects of the mother’s death.

== Music video ==
The music video was directed by Rasmus Laumann. It premiered on October 23, 2009. The video is mainly set in a closed room with the four members of Aqua seated around a table, amid a bed of dry leaves. Apart from the leaves, black and white dominate the clip.

== Chart performance ==
"My Mamma Said" at number eleven on the chart issued June 26, 2009 following the album's release due to strong digital sales. The following week it fell to number thirty-eight. On November 13, 2009 the song re-entered the chart at number twenty-three. In its fifth week on the chart, "My Mamma Said" peaked at number four. In January 2010, the song was certified gold by the International Federation of the Phonographic Industry (IFPI) for sales of 7,500 copies in Denmark.

== Charts and certifications ==
=== Charts ===
Chart (2009)	Peak position
Denmark (Tracklisten)	4
Denmark Airplay (Tracklisten)	10
Denmark Digital Songs (Billboard)	3
Denmark Streaming (Tracklisten)	4

=== Year-end Charts ===
Chart (2009)	Position
Denmark (Tracklisten)	50

=== Certifications ===
Region	Certification	Certified units/sales
Denmark (IFPI Danmark)	Gold	15,000^{^}
^{^} Shipments figures based on certification alone.
