= How R U Doin? =

Single by Aqua

from the album Megalomania
- Released: 14 March 2011
- Genre: Europop
- Length: 3:21
- Label: Universal; Mercury
- Songwriter(s): Thomas Troelsen; Søren Rasted; Claus Norreen
- Producer(s): Thomas Troelsen; Claus Norreen; Søren Rasted

Aqua singles chronology
"Spin Me a Christmas" (2009)	"How R U Doin?" (2011)	"Playmate to Jesus" (2011)

Music video
- "How R U Doin?" on YouTube

Audio sample
- "How R U Doin?": file; help

"How R U Doin?" is a song by Danish-Norwegian pop group Aqua from their third studio album, Megalomania. It was released as the album's lead single on 14 March 2011. The song peaked at number four in Denmark, becoming the group's tenth top-ten single. It has since been certified gold by the International Federation of the Phonographic Industry (IFPI) for sales of 15,000 copies.

== Background and composition ==
On 9 March 2011 Aqua posted the single artwork to "How R U Doin?" on their Facebook page with the date "14.03.2011".

The Europop song was written by Søren Rasted, Claus Norreen, and Thomas Troelsen. The song serves as the first single from their third studio album, Megalomania, which was released on 3 October 2011.

== Music video ==
The music video starts off with Søren, René, Lene, and Claus walking towards the camera with the words 'How R U Doin?' appearing on-screen in-beat with the music. René and Lene are then driving white trucks throughout a dirty, post-apocalyptic environment with Søren and Claus as passengers, respectively. After doing jumps, maneuvering through explosions, and crashing into various objects, the group walks away from the trucks - away from the camera - with the words 'How R U Doin?' appearing on-screen one last time.

== Track listing ==
- Digital download
1. "How R U Doin?" – 3:21
- Digital download — remixes
1. "How R U Doin?" (Freisig & Dif Remix) – 5:26
2. "How R U Doin?" (Club Mix) – 6:01

== Certifications ==
=== Certifications ===
Region	Certification	Certified units/sales
Denmark (IFPI Danmark)	Gold	15,000^{^}
Denmark (IFPI Danmark)	Gold	50,000^{†}
^{^} Shipments figures based on certification alone.^{†} Streaming-only figures based on certification alone.

== Release history ==
Region	Date	Format
Scandinavia	14 March 2011	Digital download
New Zealand	14 March 2011	Digital download
United States	14 March 2011	Digital download
United Kingdom	14 March 2011	Digital download
Canada	14 March 2011	Digital download
Denmark	30 May 2011	Digital download — remixes
