= Lene Thiesen =

Lene Thiesen (born 1947 in Copenhagen) is the former director of the Copenhagen International Theatre (Danish: Københavns Internationale Teater or KIT). In 1992, Thiesen was named 'Woman of the Year' by the Danish magazine Alt for damerne.

== History ==
Thiesen earned a Ph.D. in French at the University of Copenhagen, with a thesis on the Armenian, Russian-born Theatre of the Absurd playwright Artur Adamov, who wrote in French after moving to Paris. She worked as an EU translator in Brussels for a time, but left to return to Denmark. Thiesen worked with KIT for a number of years before becoming its director.

KIT has had a pioneering role in bringing a wide range of performers to Denmark; it is considered a cultural festival with global influences as much as it is a theatre. Thiesen edited a book of essays and reviews on KIT, published in Danish as FOOLS 25 : 25 års teater, dans og performance med Københavns Internationale Teater (English: Fools 25: 25 years of theatre, dance and performance with the Copenhagen International Theatre). The book includes photographs of some performers, among them innovative dance companies, 'extreme' circuses such as Archaos, musicians, theatre companies, etc.

Thiesen took a particular interest in finding circus acts from around the world, some of which placed unusual demands on her as a director; at one point she found herself in sole charge of a team of circus horses which turned up at the Copenhagen railway station without their handler. Thiesen improvised by placing them, with the consent of the Queen, in the royal stables.

She later headed a cultural programme in which the Nordic governments set up cultural exchanges with African performance groups, particularly in Johannesburg and its Soweto community. The Nordic Council of Ministers' programme ran for a two-year period in 1998 and 1999, and encompassed more than 50 exchange projects in dance, theatre, music, literature and photography. It was followed by Shuttle 02, a Danish initiative which concentrated on dance and music as two vital art forms in the South African cultural heritage.

Thiesen lived in England for several years before taking up an appointment in 2005 with the Danish Arts Agency, an arm of the Ministry of Culture. She left the agency in 2007 but as a consultant helped to organise a significant theatre exchange with China. It involved 52 performances in eight theatres, three seminars on Danish children's theatre, four workshops and 4,300 km by bus, rail and plane crossing China. This was part of a programme in which three Danish children's theatre companies initiated a two-week-long tour to China, with visits to Beijing, Shanghai, Hefei and the old cultural capital Xi'an.

The title of the project was ‘Real Tales from Denmark’, linking contemporary issues and subjects to Hans Christian Andersen's fairy tales. It was the first time that China had officially invited an international programme of travelling children's theatre to visit China to give performances, workshops and seminars.
