= Lene Marie =

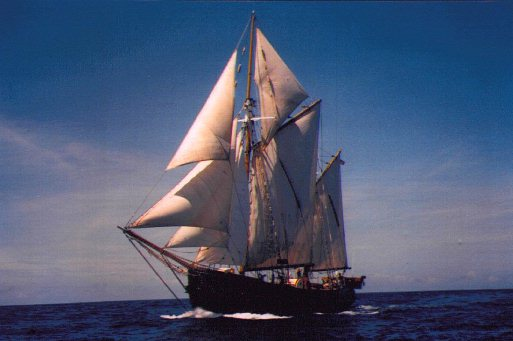
- Lene Marie off the coast of Antigua, 1992

History
- Name: Lene Marie
- Operator: Captain Douglas Meier 1992 to 1996
- Builder: Otto Hansen, Stubbekøbing, Denmark
- Launched: 1910
- Fate: Sank, November 1996

General characteristics
- Type: Motor Ketch
- Tonnage: 73 GT; 69 NT
- Displacement: 125 long tons (127 t)
- Length: 32 m (105 ft 0 in) o/a; 22.86 m (75 ft 0 in) w/l
- Beam: 6.04 m (19 ft 10 in)
- Draft: 2.29 m (7 ft 6 in)
- Propulsion: 1 × 175 hp (130 kW) GM diesel engine; 1 shaft
- Sail plan: 2,800 m^{2} (30,000 sq ft) sail area
- Speed: 8 knots (15 km/h; 9.2 mph) (engines)
- Range: 2,000 nmi (3,700 km; 2,300 mi) at 6 kn (11 km/h; 6.9 mph) (engines)

Lene Marie was a ketch-rigged tall ship, of 106 feet (32 m) overall and 200 tons displacement. She was built in Denmark in 1910 as a Baltic trader just before World War I. During the Second World War the Lene Marie sank in the Baltic Sea during a storm. She was raised by the Americans as part of their efforts to rebuild Denmark after the war.

When it was no longer economical to continue using the Lene Marie as a commercial vessel she was converted into a private yacht. Her hold was turned into a saloon and cabins were added. The fo'c'sle, containing the crew quarters, remained almost unchanged during the conversion. Several crew members reported encountering a ghost in the fo'c'sle at night. According to legend this was the ghost of a sailor who drowned in his bunk when the ship sank in World War II.

In November 1996 Lene Marie was lost en route from New York City to Bermuda. Three days into the voyage she ran into a storm. After two days the ship was taking on water and had lost three sails. A crew member was injured attempting to rig a replacement sail. The bearings in the main engine started to fail which would have left the ship without propulsion or its main pumps. As a result of the engine problems it was decided to abandon the ship and a radio distress call was made. The crew were all successfully transferred to the freighter MV Arctic which had responded to the distress call.
