= The Aqua Diary =

- Directed by: Peder Pedersen
- Starring: Aqua
- Music by: Aqua
- Distributed by: Universal Music Denmark (Denmark)
- Release date: 1998 (cinemas)
- Running time: 126 minutes
- Language: English

The Aqua Diary is a 1998 music documentary film starring the members of the Danish-Norwegian dance music group Aqua.

== Synopsis ==
The film is a comprehensive video history of Aqua, about their early days in the mid-1990s, when they were called Joyspeed as well as the personal lives of Lene Grawford Nystrom, Rene Dif, Soren Nystrom Rasted, and Claus Norreen. The film also shows footage from the band's concerts as well as a glimpse behind the stage. The film also contains the music videos for "Roses Are Red", "Barbie Girl", "Doctor Jones", "Lollipop", "My Oh My", and "Turn Back Time". A clip of "Didn't I" is heard in this film.

== Personnel ==
- Lene Grawford Nystrom – female vocals
- Rene Dif – male vocals
- Soren Nystrom Rasted – keyboard, guitar
- Claus Norreen – keyboard

=== Certifications ===
| Region | Certification | Certified units/sales |
|---|---|---|
| Australia (ARIA) | 3× Platinum | 45,000^{^} |
^{^} Shipments figures based on certification alone.
