= Back to the 80s (song) =

2009 single by Aqua

Single by Aqua

from the album Greatest Hits
- Released: 25 May 2009
- Studio: Elektron
- Length: 3:46
- Label: Universal
- Composer: Søren Rasted
- Lyricists: Søren Rasted; Claus Norreen
- Producer: Søren Rasted

Aqua singles chronology
| "We Belong to the Sea" (2001) | "Back to the 80s" (2009) | "My Mamma Said" (2009) |

Music video
- "Back to the 80s" on YouTube

"Back to the 80s" is a song by Norwegian-Danish band Aqua. The song was written by members Søren Rasted, Claus Norreen, and produced by Rasted, for their second greatest hits album (2009). "Back to the 80s" was Aqua's first single in eight years, following the release of the 2001 single "We Belong to the Sea". "Back to the 80s" was released on 25 May 2009 as the lead single from Greatest Hits and topped the Danish Singles Chart for six weeks.

== Background and composition ==
The song is a tribute to the pop culture of the 1980s, referencing numerous figures (e.g. Ronald Reagan, Mr. T, and David Hasselhoff), films (e.g. Rocky, The Breakfast Club, and Poltergeist), bands (e.g. Twisted Sister, Iron Maiden, and Bananarama), and trends (e.g. the Commodore 64, Coca-Cola Cherry, and the Rubik's Cube).

When the single was released internationally, the lyric "When M&M was just a snack and Michael Jackson's skin was black" was altered to "When M&M was just a snack and Arnie told us 'I'll be back'" (in reference to The Terminator), due to Jackson's death a month prior.

The song was released as a CD single in France on 9 November 2009. France is the only country receiving a CD release of "Back to the 80s", including the original song and two additional remixes.

== Chart performance ==
"Back to the 80s" debuted on 5 June 2009 at number one on both the Danish Singles Chart and Airplay Chart. It claimed the mark for most weekly plays on Danish radio with 585. The single spent six weeks at No. 1 in Denmark and peaked at No. 3 in Norway and at No. 25 in Sweden.

== Music video ==
In mid-May, it was announced that a video was being made. Due to a lengthy post-production process, the video didn't hit the internet until 10 June 2009. The video features the group in front of a variety of green screen created backgrounds, dressed in 1980s rocker fashions. The video is presented in "Aquascope", returning to the Aquarium-era tradition.

== Track listings ==
French CD single
| No. | Title | Remixed by | Length |
|---|---|---|---|
| 1. | "Back to the 80s" (radio edit) | | 3:44 |
| 2. | "Back to the 80s" ((D.J Tool's) Remix 2009) | René Dif, Michael Parsberg | 5:28 |
| 3. | "Back to the 80s" (Fugitive's Retro Mastermix) | Kenny Hayes | 5:26 |

UK digital download
| No. | Title | Remixed by | Length |
|---|---|---|---|
| 1. | "Back to the 80s" | | 3:46 |
| 2. | "Back to the 80s" (Fugitive's Retro Mestermix) | Kenny Hayes | 5:26 |

Australian digital download
| No. | Title | Length |
|---|---|---|
| 1. | "Back to the 80s" (radio edit) | 3:47 |
| 2. | "Back to the 80s" (extended version) | 6:37 |
| 3. | "Back to the 80s" (remix) | 6:32 |

== Credits and personnel ==
- Lyrics: Søren Rasted, Claus Norreen
- Music: Søren Rasted
- Producer: Søren Rasted in Elektron Studio
- Engineer: Nicolaj Rasted
- Guitars: Peter Düring
- Drums: Thomas Troelsen, Søren Rasted
- Keyboards: Claus Norreen, Søren Rasted
- Lead vocals: Lene Nystrøm, René Dif
- Backing vocals: Søren Rasted
- Mixing: Lars Overgaard at Audio Mix
- Mastering: Jan Eliasson at Audio Planet

== Charts ==
| Chart (2009) | Peak position |
|---|---|
| Australia (ARIA) | 122 |
| Denmark (Tracklisten) | 1 |
| Denmark Airplay (Tracklisten) | 1 |
| Denmark Bit Track (Tracklisten) | 1 |
| Denmark Digital Songs (Billboard) | 1 |
| Denmark Ringtoner (Tracklisten) | 1 |
| France (SNEP) | 20 |
| Norway (VG-lista) | 3 |
| Norway Digital Songs (Billboard) | 3 |
| Sweden (DigiListan) | 21 |
| Sweden (Sverigetopplistan) | 25 |

== Certifications ==
| Region | Certification | Certified units/sales |
|---|---|---|
| Denmark (IFPI Danmark) | Platinum | 30,000^{^} |
| Norway (IFPI Norway) | Platinum | 10,000^{*} |
^{*} Sales figures based on certification alone.^{^} Shipments figures based on certification alone.
