= Playmate to Jesus =

Single by Aqua

from the album Megalomania
- Released: 12 September 2011
- Recorded: 2011; Electron Studio (Copenhagen, Denmark)
- Genre: Pop; art pop
- Length: 4:46
- Label: Universal
- Songwriters: Søren Rasted; Claus Norreen; René Dif; Lene Nystrøm
- Producers: Claus Norreen; Søren Rasted

Aqua singles chronology
"How R U Doin?" (2011)	"Playmate to Jesus" (2011)	"Like a Robot" (2012)

Music video
- "Playmate to Jesus" on YouTube

Audio sample
- "Playmate to Jesus": file; help

"Playmate to Jesus" is a song by Danish-Norwegian pop band Aqua from their third studio album, Megalomania. The song, which was released in 2011, is about universal love and "what goes around comes around". Despite the song's positive critical reaction, it only charted in Denmark, becoming the group's second lowest-charting single. The music video, directed by Michael Sauer Christensen and filmed in Lyngby, Denmark, premiered on 22 September 2011.

== Production and composition ==
"Playmate to Jesus" was written by Aqua members Søren Rasted, Claus Norreen, René Dif and Lene Nystrøm, and produced by Norreen and Rasted. The song was recorded at Electron Studio in Copenhagen, and later mixed and mastered by Anders Schumann at C4 Studio. The song is about universal love and "what goes around comes around". The sounds in the first seconds of the song are recorded on the spacecraft Discovery. A piano and violins start the song, before the beat kicks in. A Vocoder synth comes through Nystrom's vocal in certain parts of the song, and a synth bass and distorted snare drum are also played. Dif's bridge only appears on the album version.

== Release and reception ==
A preview of "Playmate to Jesus" was uploaded to Universal Music's Danish YouTube account on 6 September 2011. It was released as the album's second single and as a radio single on 12 September, the same day as their club single "Like a Robot", which was originally planned to be released in July. "Playmate to Jesus" is the first track of their third album Megalomania. The track was Aqua's second-lowest charting single. It debuted at number twenty-six on the Danish Singles Chart, issue dated 7 October 2011. The following week the song peaked at number thirteen. In its third and final week on the chart it fell to number thirty-three. It is the group's third single not to chart within the top 10 in Denmark, the others being "We Belong to the Sea" and "Spin Me a Christmas". The song has been certified gold in Denmark by the IFPI for sales of 300,000 units.

Despite the song's commercial performance, critical reactions to the song were mixed to positive. Jon O'Brien of AllMusic, in a review of Megalomania, viewed "Playmate to Jesus" as one of the highlight songs of the album saying, "The sweeping strings, inspired sound effects, and driving country-pop melodies of the lushly produced opener 'Playmate to Jesus', [...] shows the reunion hasn't been completely without merit." Time said the song "has the dubious distinction of sounding vaguely like a Lady Gaga track that didn’t pass quality control," but was "relatively catchy, boasting the kind of musical infectiousness that causes you to hum it under your breath on the subway." Gaffa's Signe Bønsvig Wehding considered the song to be "among the best tracks on the album", along with "Dirty Little Popsong", "Sucker for a Superstar" and "Like a Robot". Idolator considered the song to be more old school than "How R U Doin?."

== Music video ==
Aqua members wear dark and gray costumes in the video.

Pictures of shooting the music video in Lyngby, Denmark were released on Aqua's Facebook page on 14 September 2011. A take of the video was also uploaded on their YouTube channel. The video was officially uploaded on YouTube on 22 September. Directed by Michael Sauer Christensen, it is set in an eerie, empty house that is reminiscent of a horror film, where a black cloud wanders through the halls of the house. The members wear black and gray clothing in the video, with Nystrom's costume gradually changing throughout. The video ends by the members exiting the house through the roof and transforming into a beam of light shooting into the sky. The video uses a shortened radio edit of the original song, omitting the bridge.

== Track listing ==
- Digital download
1. "Playmate to Jesus" – 4:46

== Personnel ==
Adapted from liner notes of Megalomania:

- Writers: Søren Rasted, Claus Norreen, René Dif, Lene Nystrøm
- Producers: Claus Norreen, Søren Rasted
- Mixing and mastering: Anders Schumann

== Sales and certifications ==
=== Chart positions ===
Chart (2011)	Peak position
Denmark (Tracklisten)	13
Denmark Airplay (Tracklisten)	6
Denmark Bit Track (Tracklisten)	1
Denmark Streaming (Tracklisten)	5

=== Certifications ===
Region	Certification	Certified units/sales
Denmark (IFPI Danmark)	Gold	15,000^{^}
^{^} Shipments figures based on certification alone.

== Release history ==
Country	Date	Format	Label
Denmark	12 September 2011	Digital download	Universal Music
Norway	12 September 2011	Digital download	Universal Music
