= Bumble Bees =

Single by Aqua

from the album Aquarius
- Released: 9 August 2000
- Recorded: 2000
- Length: 3:52
- Label: MCA
- Songwriters: Søren Rasted; Claus Norreen

Aqua singles chronology
"Around the World" (2000)	"Bumble Bees" (2000)	"We Belong to the Sea" (2001)

Music video
- "Bumble Bees" on YouTube

"Bumble Bees" (originally called "Bumble Bee") is a song recorded by Danish-Norwegian dance-pop group Aqua. It was released as their eleventh single overall, and the third from their album Aquarius. The song more closely resembled their earlier releases, not possessing the slower beat of "Turn Back Time" or the anthemic, orchestral features of "Cartoon Heroes". The song was released in several European countries in August 2000. It also peaked at number 6 in Denmark and at number 34 in Sweden.

== Music video ==
The video for the song was one of five Aqua videos directed by Peder Pedersen. It parodied the group's status as a "Barbie band"; this status was gained due to the success of their breakthrough hit "Barbie Girl". It featured the group trying to make a good music video, but being hampered by a poor director, faulty equipment, and the weight of René Dif being too much for a backstage crewman holding his support rope.

== Track List ==
=== Denmark CD Single ===
1. "Bumble Bees" (Radio Edit) 3:50
2. "Bumble Bees" (K-Klass Classic Radio Edit) 3:52

=== Europe CD Single ===
1. "Bumble Bees" (Radio Edit) 3:52
2. "Bumble Bees" (K-Klass Classic Klub Mix) 6:04
3. "Bumble Bees" (Hampenberg's Pop Mix) 6:38
4. "Bumble Bees" (Sharp Carnival Remix) 7:00

=== Australian CD Single ===
1. "Bumble Bees" (Radio Edit) 3:52
2. "Bumble Bees" (K-Klass Classic Klub Mix) 6:04
3. "Bumble Bees" (Hampenberg's Pop Mix) 6:38
4. "Bumble Bees" (Sharp Carnival Remix) 7:00
5. "Bumble Bees" (Jay Jay Mix) 5:22
6. "Bumble Bees" (Raz Club Mix) 5:37

=== Japanese CD Single ===
1. "Bumble Bees" (Radio Edit) 3:53
2. "Bumble Bees" (K-Klass Classic Radio Edit) 3:52
3. "Bumble Bees" (K-Klass Classic Klub Mix) 6:05
4. "Bumble Bees" (Hampenberg's Pop Mix) 6:40
5. "Bumble Bees" (Sharp Carnival Remix) 7:01
6. "Bumble Bees" (Jay Jay Mix)

=== Denmark Promo CD ===
1. "Bumble Bees" (K-Klass Classic Klub Mix) 6:04
2. "Bumble Bees" (Sharp Carnival Remix) 7:00
3. "Bumble Bees" (Sharp Carnival Dub) 6:59
4. "Bumble Bees" (Radio Edit) 3:52
5. "Bumble Bees" (Hampenberg's Pop Mix) 6:38
6. "Bumble Bees" (Jay Jay Mix) 5:22
7. "Bumble Bees" (Raz Club Mix) 5:37
8. "Bumble Bees" (Dawich Remix) 5:20

=== Australian Digital Download (26 September 2017) ===
1. "Bumble Bees" 3:53
2. "Bumble Bees" K-Klass Classic Klub Mix) 3:51
3. "Bumble Bees" (K-Klass Classic Klub Mix) 6:05
4. "Bumble Bees" (Hampenberg's Pop Mix) 6:40
5. "Bumble Bees" (Sharp Carnival Remix) 7:00
6. "Bumble Bees" (Dreamworld Big Bad Bambi Mix) 5:00
7. "Bumble Bees" (Jay Jay Mix) 5:24
8. "Bumble Bees" (Raz Club Mix) 5:40
9. "Bumble Bees" (Dawich Mix) 5:22

== Charts ==
Weekly chart performance for "Bumble Bees"
Chart (2000)	Peak position
Australia (ARIA)	65
Denmark (IFPI)	6
Europe (Eurochart Hot 100)	38
European Border Breakers (M&M)	13
Germany (GfK)	96
Italy (Musica e Dischi)	23
Sweden (Sverigetopplistan)	34

Annual chart rankings for "Bumble Bees"
Chart (2000)	Rank
European Airplay (Border Breakers)	77
