= Vi burde ses noget mere =

Studio album by Hej Matematik
- Released: 4 February 2008
- Recorded: 2007–2008
- Genre: Europop
- Label: Copenhagen Records

Hej Matematik chronology
| Vi burde ses noget mere (2008) | Alt går op i 6 (2010) |

Vi burde ses noget mere is the debut album of the Danish Europop duo, Hej Matematik.

The album was released on February 4, 2008, with eleven songs. Later on, it was re-released adding the successful single "Walkmand". The special edition with the single included earned the band many more fans due to the chart success of "Walkmand" that reached #3.

The album is regarded as a disc of "Smart Pop", this because the lyrics of the song have been written to represent the urban atmosphere that presents the lifestyle of "Hej Matematik."

== Track listing ==
1. "Hej matematik"
2. "Du & jeg"
3. "Centerpubben"
4. "Midtbyen"
5. "Utroskabet"
6. "Høj 5"
7. "Gymnastik"
8. "Vi ka alt vi to"
9. "Kvinderne"
10. "Vi burde ses noget mere"
11. "Så ka de lære det"

=== Special edition ===
- 12. "Walkmand"

== Singles ==
- "Gymnastik"
- "Centerpubben"
- "Du & Jeg"
- "Vi ka' alt vi to"
- Hej Matematik"
- "Walkmand" (from the special edition of the album)

== Credits ==
- Track 1, 4, 6: Co-produced by Claus Norreen
- Track 1: Guitar by Thomas Troelsen
- Track 9: Guitar by Hilmer Hassig
- Track 5: Vocals by Christina Boelskifte
- Track 8: Vocals by Lene
- Mastering by Jan Eliasson
- Track 3, 7: Mixed by Mads Nilsson
- Track 1, 2, 4, 5, 6, 8, 9, 10, 11: Mixed by Nicolaj Rasted

== Charts ==
| Hitliste (2008) | Peak position | Certification |
|---|---|---|
| Danish Album Top-40 | 4 | 2× Platinum |
