= Aquarius (Aqua album) =

Studio album by Aqua
- Released: 28 February 2000
- Recorded: January–November 1999
- Studios: RastedNorreen Mobile Studio (Mölle, Sweden and Somerset, England); Studio 2 at Swedish National Radio and Polar Studios (Stockholm, Sweden)
- Genres: Eurodance; Europop
- Length: 46:44
- Label: Universal
- Producers: Søren Rasted; Claus Norreen

Aqua chronology
Aquarium (1997)	Aquarius (2000)	Cartoon Heroes: The Best of Aqua (2002)

Singles from Aquarius
- 1. "Cartoon Heroes" Released: 1 February 2000; 2. "Around the World" Released: 30 May 2000; 3. "Bumble Bees" Released: 9 August 2000; 4. "We Belong to the Sea" Released: 9 January 2001

Aquarius is the second studio album by Danish–Norwegian band Aqua. The album was released on 28 February 2000 by Universal.

== Content ==
Summarized The A.V. Club, Aquarius is a "beat-driven and brainless" Europop album that "features the simplest rhythms, the most nasal vocals, the goofiest lyrics, and the most inane subject matter imaginable". The signature aspects of Aqua's Europop sound, such as the large-sounding hooks, upbeat tone, disco beats and the simultaneous presence of Nystrom and Dif, are present. However, it is much more varied than its previous album in the particulars of its choruses, pacing, style and additional instruments between songs, with each song having its own identity. "Freaky Friday" is a country parody, while "We Belong to the Sea" is an anthemic ballad.

== Singles ==
The lead single, "Cartoon Heroes", peaked at number one in Denmark and Norway, reached number 7 in the UK in February 2000 and later received top 10 positions globally except for the US where it failed to chart on the Billboard Hot 100. The second single, "Around the World", also peaked at number one in Denmark, but only made number 26 in UK and did not sell highly in most regions. It was the last release in most territories before the band split in 2001.

Scandinavia and other European countries saw further releases of "Bumble Bees" and "We Belong to the Sea" during late 2000, both achieving only moderate success.

"Freaky Friday" was meant to be released as a single back when the band was still promoting the album, but it ended up being cancelled. The song was then released 16 years later, in 2017, through an EP of remixes.

== Critical reception ==
Critic Stephen Thomas Erlewine labeled Aquarius an all-timer in Euro-pop, while still being alienating to those not into the genre or Aqua. As Keith Phipps wrote in his review for The A.V. Club, "the scary thing: Aqua seems heavily invested in what it does, [...] Aqua wants to make you happy, right now and in the simplest way possible. The additional pounding you hear will either be at your feet or in your head."

== Commercial performance ==
The album debuted at number one in Denmark and Norway while peaking inside the top ten in seven countries. It sold 39,000 copies in its first week in Denmark, becoming the fastest-selling album of the decade. The album became the second best-selling album of 2000, selling 174,523 copies. As of August 2001, Aquarius had sold 265,000 copies in Denmark. It became the third best-selling album of the 2000s in Denmark.

In the United States, the album debuted at number 82 on the Billboard 200 and spent six weeks on the chart. This is a significant drop from their previous album Aquarium (1997), which peaked at number seven and spent 50 weeks on the chart. Aquarius has been certified platinum by the International Federation of the Phonographic Industry (IFPI) for shipments of one million copies inside Europe. Worldwide, the album has sold four million copies.

== Track listing ==
All tracks written and produced by Søren Rasted and Claus Norreen, except where noted.

Aquarius track listing
No.	Title	Length
1.	"Cartoon Heroes"	3:38
2.	"Around the World"	3:28
3.	"Freaky Friday"	3:45
4.	"We Belong to the Sea"	4:18
5.	"An Apple a Day"	3:37
6.	"Halloween" (writers: Rasted, Norreen, René Dif)	3:49
7.	"Good Guys"	3:58
8.	"Back from Mars"	4:03
9.	"Aquarius"	4:21
10.	"Cuba Libre" (writers: Rasted, Norreen, Dif)	3:36
11.	"Bumble Bees"	3:52
12.	"Goodbye to the Circus"	3:59

Japanese edition bonus track
No.	Title	Length
13.	"Cartoon Heroes" (Metro's That's All Folks Remix)	6:23

Danish special edition bonus tracks
No.	Title	Length
13.	"Cartoon Heroes" (Metro 7-inch Edit)	4:06
14.	"Cartoon Heroes" (Love to Infinity Classic Radio Mix)	3:08

== Personnel ==
Credits adapted from album liner notes.

- Aqua – mixing
- Stefan Boman – vocal engineering
- Christian Møller Nielsen – additional programming
- René Dif – lyricist, composition, lead vocals
- Björn Engelmann – mastering
- Nana Hedin – backing vocals
- Michael Henderson – mixing
- Henrik Janson – strings arrangement
- Ulf Janson – strings arrangement
- Ole Kibsgaard – guitar
- Stig Kreutzfeldt – vocal engineering
- Jörgen Larsen – scratching
- Peter Ljung – piano
- Bernard Löhr – mixing
- Claus Norreen – composition, production, arrangement
- Lene Nystrøm – lead and backing vocals
- Stockholm Session Orchestra – strings
- Jean-Paul Wall – backing vocals
- Søren Rasted – composition, production, arrangement, backing vocals
- Anders Øland – additional programming

== Charts ==
=== Weekly charts ===
Weekly chart performance for Aquarius by Aqua
Chart (2000)	Peak position
Australian Albums (ARIA)	15
Austrian Albums (Ö3 Austria)	11
Belgian Albums (Ultratop Flanders)	18
Belgian Albums (Ultratop Wallonia)	9
Canadian Albums (Billboard)	3
Canada Top Albums/CDs (RPM)	6
Danish Albums (Hitlisten)	1
Dutch Albums (Album Top 100)	42
Estonian Albums (Eesti Top 10)	4
Finnish Albums (Suomen virallinen lista)	7
French Albums (SNEP)	37
German Albums (Offizielle Top 100)	16
Hungarian Albums (MAHASZ)	8
Irish Albums (IRMA)	36
Italian Albums (FIMI)	2
Japanese Albums (Oricon)	10
New Zealand Albums (RMNZ)	8
Norwegian Albums (VG-lista)	1
Scottish Albums (Official Charts)	33
Spanish Albums (PROMUSICAE)	3
Swedish Albums (Sverigetopplistan)	2
Swiss Albums (Schweizer Hitparade)	8
UK Albums (Official Charts)	24
US Billboard 200	82

=== Year-end charts ===
Year-end chart performance for Aquarius by Aqua
Chart (2000)	Position
Canadian Albums (Nielsen SoundScan)	34
Danish Albums (Hitlisten)	1
European Albums (Music & Media)	31
Finnish Foreign Albums (Suomen virallinen lista)	5
Italian Albums (FIMI)	28
Norwegian Winter Period Albums (VG-lista)	9
Norwegian Spring Period Albums (VG-lista)	4
South Korean International Albums (MIAK)	11
Spanish Albums (AFYVE)	29
Swedish Albums & Compilations (Sverigetopplistan)	32
Swiss Albums (Schweizer Hitparade)	82

=== Decade-end charts ===
Decade-end performance for Aquarius by Aqua
Chart (2000–2009)	Position
Danish Albums (Hitlisten)	3

== Certifications and sales ==
Certifications for Aquarius by Aqua
Region	Certification	Certified units/sales
Australia (ARIA)	Gold	35,000^{^}
Canada (Music Canada)	2× Platinum	200,000^{^}
Denmark (IFPI Danmark)	4× Platinum	265,000
Japan (RIAJ)	Platinum	200,000^{^}
Norway (IFPI Norway)	2× Platinum	100,000^{*}
South Korea	—	162,617
Spain (Promusicae)	Platinum	100,000^{^}
Sweden (GLF)	Platinum	80,000^{^}
Switzerland (IFPI Switzerland)	Gold	25,000^{^}
United Kingdom	—	35,000
Summaries
Europe (IFPI)	Platinum	1,000,000^{*}
Worldwide	—	4,000,000
^{*} Sales figures based on certification alone.^{^} Shipments figures based on certification alone.

== Release history ==
Release formats for Aquarius
Region	Date	Format	Label
Worldwide	28 February 2000	CD / Cassette	Universal Music
United States	28 March 2000	CD / Cassette	MCA Records
