= Around the World (Aqua song) =

2000 single by Aqua

Single by Aqua

from the album Aquarius
- Released: 25 April 2000
- Length: 3:28
- Label: Universal
- Songwriters: Søren Rasted; Claus Norreen
- Producers: Søren Rasted; Claus Norreen

Aqua singles chronology
| "Cartoon Heroes" (2000) | "Around the World" (2000) | "Bumble Bees" (2000) |

Music video
- "Around the World" on YouTube

"Around the World" is a song by the Danish-Norwegian dance-pop group Aqua. It was released as the second single from their second studio album, Aquarius, in April 2000 by Universal. In the UK, it was released the following month, serving as the group's final single in the country before their split in mid-2001. The song reached the top 10 in Denmark, Romania and Sweden.

== Background and release ==
"Around the World" was originally called "Larger than Life", but was renamed after American boy band Backstreet Boys released a single with the same title in 1999. The group has described the song as a "happy-dancing song with a huge, massive choir." "Around the World" was released on 25 April 2000, with the United Kingdom release following on 29 May 2000.

== Commercial performance ==
"Around the World" was a top-five chart hit in Denmark and Sweden, reaching number four in both countries. In Sweden, the song sold enough copies to be certified gold a week into its release, debuting at number four and maintaining its peak position for three weeks. It stayed in the top 10 for three more, becoming the country's 54th-highest-selling single of 2000. In Denmark, the song debuted in the top 10 at number nine, before moving to number four the following week, spending a total of three weeks in the top 10. "Around the World" was Aqua's last and lowest-peaking entry on the UK Singles Chart, as well as their first to fail to reach the top 20, peaking at number 26.

Elsewhere, the song entered the top 20 in Italy, Norway and Spain. By the end of May, "Around the World" reached its peak on the Eurochart Hot 100, at number 51. In terms of airplay, it peaked within the top 40 of the European airplay chart and entered the top 10 on the airplay charts of Romania, Scandinavia and Spain. According to Music & Media's Border Breakers chart, it was the 18th-most played song released on a mainland European label in the areas outside its country of signing.

== Track listings ==
UK CD1

1. "Around the World" (radio edit) – 3:28
2. "Around the World" (Sound Surfers club mix) – 6:05
3. "Around the World" (Dave Sears club mix) – 7:05
4. "Around the World" (video) – 3:28

UK CD2

1. "Around the World" (radio edit) – 3:28
2. "Around the World" (Junior's Marathon radio mix) – 4:42
3. "Around the World" (Rüegsegger#Wittwer remix) – 7:41

Australian CD single

1. "Around the World" (radio edit) – 3:28
2. "Around the World" (Sound Surfers club mix) – 6:05
3. "Around the World" (Dave Sears club mix) – 7:04
4. "Around the World" (Junior's Marathon mix) – 13:40
5. "Around the World" (Rüegsegger#Wittwer remix) – 7:41
6. Enhanced section (contains music video and behind-the-scenes video)

Dutch CD single

1. "Around the World" (radio edit) – 3:28
2. "Around the World" (Sound Surfers radio edit) – 3:39

Japanese CD single

1. "Around the World" (radio edit)
2. "Around the World" (Sound Surfers radio edit)
3. "Aquarius"

Australian digital download (10 September 2017)

1. "Around the World" – 3:29
2. "Around the World" (Sound Surfers radio edit) – 3:39
3. "Around the World" (Jonathan peters radio remix) – 3:47
4. "Around the World" (Sound Surfers club mix) – 6:07
5. "Around the World" (Jonathan Peters club mix) – 7:27
6. "Around the World" (Rüegsegger#Wittwer remix) – 7:41
7. "Around the World" (Dave Sears club mix) – 7:07
8. "Around the World" (Junior's Marathon mix) – 13:42

== Charts ==
=== Weekly charts ===
Weekly chart performance for "Around the World"
| Chart (2000) | Peak position |
|---|---|
| Australia (ARIA) | 35 |
| Belgium (Ultratip Bubbling Under Flanders) | 2 |
| Denmark (IFPI) | 4 |
| Europe (Eurochart Hot 100) | 51 |
| Europe Airplay (European Hit Radio) | 35 |
| Europe Border Breakers (Music & Media) | 4 |
| Germany (GfK) | 56 |
| Ireland (IRMA) | 47 |
| Italy (FIMI) | 17 |
| Netherlands (Dutch Top 40 Tipparade) | 6 |
| Netherlands (Single Top 100) | 44 |
| Norway (VG-lista) | 16 |
| Romania (Romanian Top 100) | 6 |
| Scottish Singles Sales (Official Charts) | 22 |
| Spain (Promusicae) | 14 |
| Spain Airplay (Music & Media) | 7 |
| Sweden (Sverigetopplistan) | 4 |
| Switzerland (Schweizer Hitparade) | 42 |
| UK Singles (Official Charts) | 26 |

=== Year-end charts ===
Year-end chart performance for "Around the World"
| Chart (2000) | Position |
|---|---|
| Europe Border Breakers (Music & Media) | 18 |
| Romania (Romanian Top 100) | 68 |
| Sweden (Hitlistan) | 54 |

== Certifications ==
Certifications and sales for "Around the World"
| Region | Certification | Certified units/sales |
|---|---|---|
| Sweden (GLF) | Gold | 15,000^{^} |
^{^} Shipments figures based on certification alone.

== Release history ==
Release dates and formats for "Around the World"
| Region | Date | Format(s) | Label(s) | Ref. |
|---|---|---|---|---|
| Europe | 25 April 2000 | CD | Universal | |
| Japan | 28 April 2000 | CD | Universal | |
| United Kingdom | 29 May 2000 | CD; cassette | Universal | |
