= Cartoon Heroes =

2000 single by Aqua

Single by Aqua

from the album Aquarius
- Released: 31 January 2000
- Length: 3:38
- Label: Universal
- Songwriters: Søren Rasted; Claus Norreen
- Producers: Søren Rasted; Claus Norreen

Aqua singles chronology
"Good Morning Sunshine" (1998)	"Cartoon Heroes" (2000)	"Around the World" (2000)

Music video
- "Cartoon Heroes" on YouTube

"Cartoon Heroes" is a song by Danish-Norwegian dance-pop group Aqua from their second studio album, Aquarius. The song was sent to radio stations worldwide on 1 January 2000 and was released as a retail single on 31 January 2000. It was their first release anywhere for over 14 months due to the time spent touring the world, resting, and recording Aquarius.

Although a commercial success, "Cartoon Heroes" failed to follow the success of earlier songs such as "Barbie Girl" and "Doctor Jones". In Denmark, the song debuted at number one, selling enough copies to earn a quadruple-platinum sales certification within 48 hours of its release; it went on to become the country's highest-selling single of 2000. It also topped the charts of Italy, Norway, and Spain and reached the top 10 in at least nine other countries, including Belgium, Ireland, Sweden, and the United Kingdom.

== Music video ==
The music video for this song was filmed in December 1999. It starts with an American newscaster reporting on broadcast that a one-eyed sea monster attacks the world prompting an SOS call for Aqua in space. The quartet wakes up in zero gravity and Søren pushes up the gravity lever. They put on their hero suits and prepare to drive their spaceship to planet Earth where the sea monster is deep in the ocean. The quartet then puts on their diving suits and they fight the sea monster they seek. The green slime that bursts out of the sea monster's defeat transmits to the ending where the triumphant quartet returns to the ship with Søren and Claus who's had their leg and arm injured and the ship goes to the surface.

Directed by Czech movie director Tomáš Mašín, the video is said to be one of the most expensive music videos ever made; reportedly, it cost $3.5 million to produce ($6.54 million in 2025).

== Track listings ==
European HDCD single, Canadian and Japanese CD single

1. "Cartoon Heroes" (radio edit) – 3:38
2. "Cartoon Heroes" (Love to Infinity classic radio mix) – 3:08

European maxi-HDCD single

1. "Cartoon Heroes" (radio edit) – 3:38
2. "Cartoon Heroes" (Metro's That's All Folks remix) – 6:22
3. "Cartoon Heroes" (Hampenberg remix) – 5:41
4. "Cartoon Heroes" (Junior's Playground mix) – 7:53
5. "Cartoon Heroes" (E-Lite extended remix) – 9:09

UK CD1

1. "Cartoon Heroes" (radio edit) – 3:45
2. "Cartoon Heroes" (TNT mix) – 7:28
3. "Cartoon Heroes" (Love to Infinity classic mix) – 6:28

UK CD2

1. "Cartoon Heroes" (radio edit) – 3:38
2. "Cartoon Heroes" (Sleaze Sisters Anthem mix) – 7:50
3. "Cartoon Heroes" (Metro's That's All Folks radio edit) – 4:05
4. "Cartoon Heroes" (video) – 5:05

UK cassette single

1. "Cartoon Heroes" (radio edit) – 3:45
2. "Cartoon Heroes" (Love to Infinity classic mix) – 6:28

Australian CD single

1. "Cartoon Heroes" (radio edit) – 3:38
2. "Cartoon Heroes" (Love to Infinity classic mix) – 6:28
3. "Cartoon Heroes" (TNT mix) – 7:29
4. "Cartoon Heroes" (video)
5. "Cartoon Heroes" (behind the scenes video)

== Charts ==
=== Weekly charts ===
Weekly chart performance for "Cartoon Heroes"
Chart (2000)	Peak position
Australia (ARIA)	16
Austria (Ö3 Austria Top 40)	6
Belgium (Ultratop 50 Flanders)	5
Belgium (Ultratop 50 Wallonia)	7
Canada (Nielsen SoundScan)	2
Canada Dance/Urban (RPM)	23
Denmark (IFPI)	1
Estonia (Eesti Top 20)	1
Europe (Eurochart Hot 100)	5
Finland (Suomen virallinen lista)	9
France (SNEP)	40
Germany (GfK)	13
Iceland (Íslenski Listinn Topp 40)	8
Ireland (IRMA)	10
Italy (FIMI)	1
Italy Airplay (Music & Media)	1
Netherlands (Dutch Top 40 Tipparade)	2
Netherlands (Single Top 100)	35
New Zealand (Recorded Music NZ)	6
Norway (VG-lista)	1
Scottish Singles Sales (Official Charts)	6
Spain (Promusicae)	1
Sweden (Sverigetopplistan)	2
Switzerland (Schweizer Hitparade)	11
UK Singles (Official Charts)	7

=== Year-end charts ===
Year-end chart performance for "Cartoon Heroes"
Chart (2000)	Position
Australia (ARIA)	99
Belgium (Ultratop 50 Flanders)	64
Belgium (Ultratop 50 Wallonia)	39
Denmark (IFPI)	1
Europe (Eurochart Hot 100)	50
Europe Airplay (Music & Media)	92
Europe Border Breakers (Music & Media)	8
Germany (Media Control)	97
Italy (Musica e dischi)	27
Spain (AFYVE)	13
Sweden (Hitlistan)	20
Switzerland (Schweizer Hitparade)	77
UK Singles (OCC)	127

== Certifications ==
Certifications and sales for "Cartoon Heroes"
Region	Certification	Certified units/sales
Australia (ARIA)	Gold	35,000^{^}
Denmark (IFPI Danmark)	4× Platinum	40,000
New Zealand (RMNZ)	Gold	5,000^{*}
Norway (IFPI Norway)	Gold	
Sweden (GLF)	Platinum	30,000^{^}
^{*} Sales figures based on certification alone.^{^} Shipments figures based on certification alone.

== Release history ==
Release dates and formats for "Cartoon Heroes"
Region	Date	Format(s)	Label(s)	Ref.
Worldwide	1 January 2000	Radio	Universal	
Denmark	31 January 2000	CD	Universal	
Canada	1 February 2000	CD	Universal	
Japan	2 February 2000	CD	Universal	
United Kingdom	14 February 2000	CD; cassette	Universal	
