= Lists of comedians =

The following are lists of comedians.

== By nationality ==
- List of Australian comedians
  - List of Australian stand-up comedians
- List of Bangladeshi comedians
- List of British comedians
- List of Canadian comedians
  - List of Quebec comedians
- List of Dutch comedians
- List of Filipino comedians
- List of Finnish comedians
- List of Indian comedians
- List of Italian comedians
- List of Japanese comedians
- List of Mexican comedians
- List of Nigerian comedians
- List of Portuguese comedians
- List of Puerto Rican comedians

== Other ==
- List of comedians
- List of deadpan comedians
- List of The Daily Show correspondents
- List of The Daily Show writers
- List of German-language comedians
- List of Mad TV cast members
- List of New York Improv comedians
- List of stand-up comedians
