= List of comedians =

A comedian is one who entertains through comedy, such as jokes and other forms of humour. Following is a list of comedians, comedy groups, and comedy writers.

== Comedians ==
(sorted alphabetically by surname)

=== A ===
- Celya AB (born 1995)
- Rose Abdoo (born 1962)
- Raymond Ablack (born 1989)
- John Aboud (born 1973)
- Silvia Abril (born 1971)
- James Acaster (born 1985)
- Jayde Adams (born 1984)
- Kev Adams (born 1991)
- Mark Addy (born 1964)
- Lolly Adefope (born 1990)
- Demi Adejuyigbe (born 1992)
- Dylan Adler (born 1996/1997)
- Pamela Adlon (born 1966)
- James Adomian (born 1980)
- Scott Adsit (born 1965)
- Bayani Agbayani (born 1969)
- Steve Agee (born 1969)
- Alex Agnew (born 1973)
- Ryan Agoncillo (born 1979)
- Rubén Aguirre (1934–2016)
- Dan Ahdoot (born 1981)
- Caroline Aherne (1963–2016)
- Ahmed Ahmed (born 1970)
- Sohail Ahmed (born 1963)
- Franklyn Ajaye (born 1949)
- Anna Akana (born 1989)
- Malin Akerman (born 1978)
- Nawaal Akram (born 1990)
- Nasser Al Qasabi (born 1963)
- Lori Alan (born 1966)
- Joe Alaskey (1952–2016)
- Carlos Alazraqui (born 1962)
- Rory Albanese (born 1977)
- Lou Albano (1933–2009)
- Eddie Albert (1906–2005)
- Ogie Alcasid (born 1967)
- Alan Alda (born 1936)
- Babatunde Aléshé (born 1986)
- Erika Alexander (born 1969)
- Jason Alexander (born 1959)
- Mo Alexander (born 1970)
- Ted Alexandro (born 1969)
- Asif Ali (born 1988)
- Allan K. (born 1958)
- Barbara Jo Allen (1906–1974)
- Dave Allen (1936–2005)
- Gracie Allen (1895–1964)
- Krista Allen (born 1971)
- Leo Allen (born 1972)
- Marty Allen (1922–2018)
- Steve Allen (1921–2000)
- Tim Allen (born 1953)
- Woody Allen (born 1935)
- Kirstie Alley (1951–2022)
- Kevin Allison (born 1970)
- Stephanie Allynne (born 1986)
- Anabel Alonso (born 1964)
- Cristela Alonzo (born 1979)
- Bobbi Althoff (born 1997)
- Jeff Altman (born 1951)
- Brian Jordan Alvarez (born 1987)
- The Amazing Johnathan (1958–2022)
- Utkarsh Ambudkar (born 1983)
- Don Ameche (1908–1993)
- Robbie Amell (born 1988)
- Mo Amer (born 1981)
- John Amos (1939–2024)
- Megan Amram (born 1987)
- Simon Amstell (born 1979)
- Morey Amsterdam (1908–1996)
- Andrea Anders (born 1975)
- Siw Anita Andersen (born 1966)
- Amy Anderson (born 1972)
- Anthony Anderson (born 1970)
- Blake Anderson (born 1984)
- Harry Anderson (1952–2018)
- James Anderson
- Louie Anderson (1953–2022)
- Wil Anderson (born 1974)
- Eric André (born 1983)
- Alex Anfanger (born 1985)
- Michael Angarano (born 1987)
- Vittorio Angelone (born 1996)
- Lucia Aniello (born 1983)
- Hammed Animashaun (born 1991)
- Jennifer Aniston (born 1969)
- Zach Anner (born 1984)
- Aziz Ansari (born 1983)
- Ant (born 1967)
- Dave Anthony (born 1967)
- Craig Anton (born 1962)
- Judd Apatow (born 1967)
- Ingo Appelt (born 1967)
- Christina Applegate (born 1971)
- John Aprea (1941–2024)
- Carly Aquilino (born 1990)
- Kris Aquino (born 1971)
- Nicole Arbour (born 1985)
- Lisa Arch (born 1971)
- Roscoe "Fatty" Arbuckle (1887–1933)
- Jeff Arcuri (born 1987)
- Geoffrey Arend (born 1978)
- Lesley Arfin (born 1979)
- Marcella Arguello (born 1985)
- Fred Armisen (born 1966)
- Alexander Armstrong (born 1970)
- Desi Arnaz (1917–1986)
- Will Arnett (born 1970)
- David A. Arnold (1968–2022)
- Tichina Arnold (born 1969)
- Tom Arnold (born 1959)
- David Arquette (born 1971)
- Bea Arthur (1922–2009)
- Aaron Aryanpur (born 1978)
- Katie Aselton (born 1978)
- Avital Ash (born 1986)
- Erica Ash (1977–2024)
- Lauren Ash (born 1983)
- Annaleigh Ashford (born 1985)
- Arthur Askey (1900–1982)
- Ed Asner (1929–2021)
- Sean Astin (born 1971)
- Skylar Astin (born 1987)
- Emily Atack (born 1989)
- Anthony Atamanuik (born 1974)
- Aristotle Athari (born 1991)
- Essence Atkins (born 1972)
- Rowan Atkinson (born 1955)
- Helen Atkinson-Wood (born 1955)
- Dave Attell (born 1965)
- Michael "Atters" Attree (born 1965)
- Scott Aukerman (born 1970)
- Phil Austin (1941–2015)
- Joe Avati (born 1974)
- Shondrella Avery (born 1971)
- Awkwafina (born 1988)
- Ayelet the Kosher Komic
- Dan Aykroyd (born 1952)
- Peter Aykroyd (1955–2021)
- Pam Ayres (born 1947)
- Damali Ayo (born 1972)
- Richard Ayoade (born 1977)
- Hank Azaria (born 1964)
- Hannan Azlan
- Valerie Azlynn (born 1980)

=== B ===
- Baba Ali (born 1975)
- Dirk Bach (1961–2012)
- King Bach (born 1988)
- Jim Backus (1913–1989)
- Diedrich Bader (born 1966)
- Max Baer Jr. (born 1937)
- Ross Bagley (born 1988)
- Tim Bagley (born 1957)
- Iris Bahr (born 1977)
- Ainsley Bailey (born 1992)
- Ben Bailey (born 1970)
- Bill Bailey (born 1965)
- Conrad Bain (1923–2013)
- Scott Baio (born 1960)
- Nick Bakay (born 1959)
- Bobbie Baker
- Leslie David Baker (born 1958)
- Rosebud Baker (born 1985)
- Sarah Baker (born 1973)
- Dan Bakkedahl (born 1969)
- Carlos Balá (1925–2022)
- Bob Balaban (born 1945)
- Josiane Balasko (born 1950)
- Hugo Egon Balder (born 1950)
- Alec Baldwin (born 1958)
- Dougie Baldwin (born 1996)
- Lucille Ball (1911–1989)
- Kaye Ballard (1925–2019)
- Reginald Ballard (born 1965)
- Tom Ballard (born 1989)
- Paolo Ballesteros (born 1982)
- Colleen Ballinger (born 1986)
- Tim Baltz (born 1981)
- Maria Bamford (born 1970)
- Ayoade Bamgboye (born 1993 or 1994)
- Eric Bana (born 1968)
- Ryan Bang (born 1991)
- Elizabeth Banks (born 1974)
- Morwenna Banks (born 1961)
- Zach Barack (born 1995)
- Edward Barbanell (born 1977)
- Celeste Barber (born 1982)
- Lance Barber (born 1973)
- Ralph Barbosa (born 1996)
- Joy Barcoma (born 1998)
- Nate Bargatze (born 1979)
- Robert Baril (born 1986/1987)
- Ike Barinholtz (born 1977)
- Jon Barinholtz (born 1982)
- Arj Barker (born 1974)
- Curry Barker (born 1999)
- Ronnie Barker (1929–2005)
- Caitlin Barlow (born 1983)
- Angela Barnes (born 1976)
- Cooper Barnes (born 1979)
- Kevin Barnett (1986–2019)
- Ty Barnett (born 1975)
- Vince Barnett (1902–1977)
- Sandy Baron (1937–2001)
- Anita Barone (born 1964)
- Mary Beth Barone (born 1991)
- Roseanne Barr (born 1952)
- Julian Barratt (born 1968)
- Amanda Barrie (born 1935)
- Kenya Barris (born 1974)
- Carl Barron (born 1968)
- GK Barry (born 1999)
- Todd Barry (born 1964)
- Drew Barrymore (born 1975)
- Mario Barth (born 1972)
- Justin Bartha (born 1978)
- Jay Baruchel (born 1982)
- Frank-Markus Barwasser (born 1960)
- David Alan Basche (born 1968)
- Jason Bateman (born 1969)
- Angelique Bates (born 1980)
- Kathy Bates (born 1948)
- David Batra (born 1972)
- Brian Baumgartner (born 1972)
- Eric Bauza (1979–2026)
- Stanley Baxter (1926–2025)
- Vanessa Bayer (born 1981)
- Mathew Baynton (born 1980)
- Wally Bayola (born 1972)
- Carter Bays (born 1975)
- Aisling Bea (born 1984)
- Ally Beardsley (born 1988)
- Allyce Beasley (born 1954)
- Anne Beatts (1947–2021)
- Lucy Beaumont (born 1983)
- Alison Becker (born 1977)
- Jürgen Becker (born 1959)
- Rob Beckett (born 1986)
- Samantha Bee (born 1969)
- Beetlejuice (born 1968)
- Joy Behar (born 1942)
- Natasha Behnam (born 1996)
- Kimia Behpoornia (born 1992)
- Greg Behrendt (born 1963)
- Beth Behrs (born 1985)
- Ashley Bell (born 1986)
- Jillian Bell (born 1984)
- Lake Bell (born 1979)
- Tone Bell (born 1983)
- W. Kamau Bell (born 1973)
- Bill Bellamy (born 1965)
- Ryan Belleville (born 1979)
- Saidah Belo-Osagie (born 1996)
- Jim Belushi (born 1954)
- John Belushi (1949–1982)
- Richard Belzer (1944–2023)
- Bea Benaderet (1906–1968)
- H. Jon Benjamin (born 1966)
- Owen Benjamin (born 1980)
- Beck Bennett (born 1984)
- Jeff Bennett (born 1962)
- Ron Bennington (born 1958)
- D.C. Benny
- Jack Benny (1894–1974)
- Doug Benson (born 1964)
- Alec Berg (born 1969)
- Candice Bergen (born 1946)
- Edgar Bergen (1903–1978)
- Tom Bergeron (born 1955)
- Peter Paul Bergman (1939–2012)
- Kate Berlant (born 1987)
- Milton Berle (1908–2002)
- Shelley Berman (1925–2017)
- Crystal Bernard (born 1961)
- Hannah Berner (born 1991)
- Sandra Bernhard (born 1955)
- Matt Berry (born 1974)
- Joe Besser (1907–1988)
- Matt Besser (born 1967)
- Ilka Bessin (born 1971)
- Danny Bhoy (born 1976)
- Mayim Bialik (born 1975)
- Leslie Bibb (born 1973)
- Craig Bierko (born 1964)
- Jason Biggs (born 1978)
- Mike Birbiglia (born 1978)
- Simon Bird (born 1984)
- Mary Birdsong (born 1968)
- Des Bishop (born 1975)
- Joey Bishop (1918–2007)
- John Bishop (born 1966)
- Kevin Bishop (born 1980)
- Danielle Bisutti (born 1976)
- Ashley Nicole Black (born 1985)
- Jack Black (born 1969)
- Jordan Black (born 1970)
- Lewis Black (born 1948)
- Michael Ian Black (born 1971)
- Michael Blackson (born 1972)
- Quenlin Blackwell (born 2001)
- Selma Blair (born 1972)
- Mark Blankfield (1950–2024)
- Hamish Blake (born 1981)
- Susanne Blakeslee (born 1956)
- Mel Blanc (1908–1989)
- Maria Blasucci (born 1986)
- Tempestt Bledsoe (born 1973)
- Brian Blessed (born 1936)
- Rich Blomquist (born 1977)
- Rachel Bloom (born 1987)
- Ben Blue (1901–1975)
- Josh Blue (born 1978)
- Sarayu Blue (born 1975)
- Amir Blumenfeld (born 1983)
- John Bluthal (1929–2018)
- Raphael Bob-Waksberg (born 1984)
- Alonzo Bodden (born 1967)
- Steve Bodow
- Mirja Boes (born 1971)
- Catherine Bohart (born 1988)
- Danny Bonaduce (born 1959)
- Sue Bond (born 1945)
- Peter Bonerz (born 1938)
- Bobby Bones (born 1980)
- Wigald Boning (born 1967)
- Sonny Bono (1935–1998)
- Dany Boon (born 1966)
- Elayne Boosler (born 1952)
- Joel Kim Booster (born 1988)
- Connie Booth (born 1940)
- Tato Bores (1927–1996)
- Flula Borg (born 1982)
- Victor Borge (1909–2000)
- Ernest Borgnine (1917–2012)
- Kyle Bornheimer (born 1975)
- Alex Borstein (born 1971)
- Loren Bouchard (born 1969)
- Lilan Bowden (born 1985)
- Andrew Bowen (born 1972)
- Julie Bowen (born 1970)
- Byron Bowers (born 1978)
- John Ross Bowie (born 1971)
- Max Boyce (born 1945)
- Steven Boyer (born 1979)
- Frankie Boyle (born 1972)
- Peter Boyle (1935–2006)
- Fern Brady (born 1986)
- Wayne Brady (born 1972)
- Harriet Braine
- Zach Braff (born 1975)
- Joey Bragg (born 1996)
- Brahmanandam (born 1956)
- Patrick Brammall (born 1976)
- Jo Brand (born 1957)
- Russell Brand (born 1975)
- Betsy Brandt (born 1973)
- Guy Branum (born 1975)
- Larry Brantley (born 1966)
- John Branyan (born 1965)
- Matt Braunger (born 1974)
- Kurt Braunohler (born 1976)
- Daniel Breaker (born 1980)
- El Brendel (1890–1964)
- Josh Brener (born 1984)
- Kevin Brennan (born 1960)
- Neal Brennan (born 1974)
- Tommy Brennan (born 1994)
- David Brenner (1936–2014)
- Jim Breuer (born 1967)
- Paget Brewster (born 1969)
- Fanny Brice (1891–1951)
- Todd Bridges (born 1965)
- Alison Brie (born 1982)
- Ali Brice (born 1986)
- Sabrina Brier (born 1994)
- Richard Briers (1934–2013)
- Joe Bob Briggs (born 1953)
- Charlie Brill (born 1938)
- Patrick Bristow (born 1962)
- Janine Brito
- Paul Brittain (born 1977)
- Doug Brochu (born 1990)
- Matthew Broderick (born 1962)
- Adam Brody (born 1979)
- Jimmy Brogan (born 1948)
- Benjy Bronk (born 1967)
- Tim Brooke-Taylor (1940–2020)
- Charlie Brooker (born 1971)
- Albert Brooks (born 1947)
- Foster Brooks (1912–2001)
- James L. Brooks (born 1940)
- Max Brooks (born 1972)
- Mel Brooks (born 1926)
- Brittany Broski (born 1997)
- Brother Theodore (1906–2001)
- Alan Brough (born 1967)
- A. Whitney Brown (born 1952)
- Alton Brown (born 1962)
- Candace Brown (born 1980)
- Clancy Brown (born 1959)
- Cocoa Brown (born 1972)
- Joe E. Brown (1891–1973)
- Kevin Brown (born 1972)
- Tabitha Brown (born 1979)
- Wally Brown (1904–1961)
- Yvette Nicole Brown (born 1971)
- Carrie Brownstein (born 1974)
- Lenny Bruce (1925–1966)
- Hazel Brugger (born 1993)
- Quinta Brunson (born 1989)
- Aidy Bryant (born 1987)
- Cubby Bryant (born 1971)
- Rob Brydon (born 1965)
- Bubba the Love Sponge (born 1966)
- Andy Buckley (born 1965)
- James Buckley (born 1987)
- Sophie Buddle (born 1994)
- Herlene Budol (born 1999)
- Jim J. Bullock (born 1955)
- Sandra Bullock (born 1964)
- Vicco von Bülow (1923–2011)
- Rodger Bumpass (born 1951)
- Michael Bunin (born 1970)
- John Bunny (1863–1915)
- David Burd (aka) Lil Dicky (born 1988)
- Hannibal Buress (born 1983)
- Tituss Burgess (born 1979)
- Delta Burke (born 1956)
- Kathy Burke (born 1964)
- Susan Theresa Burke (born 1982)
- Carol Burnett (born 1933)
- Bo Burnham (born 1990)
- Burnie Burns (born 1973)
- George Burns (1896–1996)
- Jack Burns (1933–2020)
- Regan Burns (born 1968)
- Sarah Burns (born 1981)
- Bill Burr (born 1968)
- Maryedith Burrell (born 1952)
- Ty Burrell (born 1967)
- Abe Burrows (1910–1985)
- James Burrows (born 1940)
- Steve Buscemi (born 1957)
- Adam Busch (born 1978)
- Mikey Bustos (born 1981)
- River Butcher (born 1982)
- Michelle Buteau (born 1977)
- Brett Butler (born 1958)
- Red Buttons (1919–2006)
- Adam Buxton (born 1969)
- Ruth Buzzi (1936–2025)
- Nicole Byer (born 1986)
- John Byner (born 1938)
- Ed Byrne (born 1972)
- Jason Byrne (born 1972)
- P. J. Byrne (born 1974)
- Rose Byrne (born 1979)
- Steve Byrne (born 1974)

=== C ===
- Louis C.K. (born 1967)
- Vladimir Caamaño (born 1979)
- Mike Cabellon
- Angelique Cabral (born 1979)
- Liz Cackowski
- Sid Caesar (1922–2014)
- Frank Caeti (born 1973)
- Frank Caliendo (born 1975)
- Charlie Callas (1924–2011)
- Bryan Callen (born 1967)
- Frances Callier (born 1969)
- Rhona Cameron (born 1965)
- Jaime Camil (born 1973)
- Anna Camp (born 1982)
- Colleen Camp (born 1953)
- Adam Campbell (born 1980)
- Archie Campbell (1914–1987)
- Bruce Campbell (born 1958)
- Craig Campbell (born 1969)
- Heather Anne Campbell
- Larry Joe Campbell (born 1970)
- Neil Campbell
- Sam Campbell (born 1991)
- Tisha Campbell (born 1968)
- Maria Canals-Barrera (born 1966)
- John Candy (1950–1994)
- Bobby Cannavale (born 1970)
- Kay Cannon (born 1974)
- Nick Cannon (born 1980)
- Judy Canova (1913–1983)
- Melai Cantiveros (born 1988)
- Mario Cantone (born 1959)
- Guido Cantz (born 1971)
- John Caparulo (born 1975)
- Blaine Capatch (born 1965)
- Lizzy Caplan (born 1982)
- Twink Caplan (born 1947)
- Scott Capurro (born 1962)
- Perry Caravello (born 1963)
- Matty Cardarople (born 1983)
- Linda Cardellini (born 1975)
- D'Arcy Carden (born 1980)
- Nancy Carell (born 1966)
- Steve Carell (born 1962)
- Anthony Carelli (aka) Santino Marella (born 1974)
- Drew Carey (born 1958)
- Liz Carey (born 1978)
- Maggie Carey (born 1975)
- George Carl (1916–2000)
- George Carlin (1937–2008)
- Jordan Carlos (born 1978)
- Urzila Carlson (born 1976)
- Jerrod Carmichael (born 1987)
- Alan Carney (1909–1973)
- Art Carney (1918–2003)
- Adam Carolla (born 1964)
- Alan Carr (born 1976)
- Jimmy Carr (born 1972)
- Jim Carrey (born 1962)
- Rodney Carrington (born 1968)
- Jack Carroll (born 1998)
- Pat Carroll (1927–2022)
- Carrot Top (Scott Thompson) (born 1965)
- Jasper Carrott (born 1945)
- Johnny Carson (1925–2005)
- Nell Carter (1948–2003)
- Nancy Cartwright (born 1957)
- Dana Carvey (born 1955)
- Neil Casey (born 1981)
- Aya Cash (born 1982)
- Cliff Cash (born 1981)
- Craig Cash (born 1960)
- Michael Cassidy (born 1983)
- Dan Castellaneta (born 1957)
- Mike Castle (born 1989)
- Roy Castle (1932–1994)
- Arturo Castro (born 1985)
- Jade Catta-Preta (born 1984)
- Mary Jo Catlett (born 1938)
- Walter Catlett (1889–1960)
- Kim Cattrall (born 1956)
- John Catucci (born 1973)
- Jo Caulfield (born 1965)
- Tony Cavalero (born 1983)
- Elise Cavanna (1902–1963)
- Dick Cavett (born 1936)
- JC Caylen (born 1992)
- Adam Cayton-Holland (born 1980)
- Kyle Cease (born 1977)
- Cedric the Entertainer (born 1964)
- Kiray Celis (born 1995)
- Wyatt Cenac (born 1976)
- Michael Cera (born 1988)
- Bülent Ceylan (born 1976)
- Jessica Chaffin (born 1974)
- Rachel Chagall (born 1952)
- Sarah Chalke (born 1976)
- Kevin Chamberlin (born 1963)
- Emma Chambers (1964–2018)
- Jackie Chan (born 1954)
- Melanie Chandra (born 1984)
- Jay Chandrasekhar (born 1968)
- Carol Channing (1921–2019)
- Jay Chanoine (born 1986/1987)
- Zoë Chao (born 1985)
- Omar Chaparro (born 1974)
- Charlie Chaplin (1889–1977)
- Graham Chapman (1941–1989)
- Doug Chappel (born 1975)
- Dave Chappelle (born 1973)
- Charlamagne tha God (born 1978)
- Craig Charles (born 1964)
- Josh Charles (born 1971)
- Charo
- Melanie Chartoff (born 1948)
- Charley Chase (1893–1940)
- Chevy Chase (born 1943)
- Michael Che (born 1983)
- Karen Chee (born 1995)
- Parvesh Cheena (born 1979)
- Richard Cheese (born 1965)
- Aaron Chen (born 1995)
- Hank Chen (born 1989)
- Kristin Chenoweth (born 1968)
- Zach Cherry (born 1987)
- Cherry Chevapravatdumrong (born 1977)
- Ronny Chieng (born 1985)
- Autumn Chiklis (born 1993)
- Michael Chiklis (born 1963)
- Feodor Chin (born 1974)
- Chingo Bling (Pedro Herrera) (born 1979)
- Lori Tan Chinn (born 1948)
- Nasir Chinyoti (born 1970)
- Ted Chippington (born 1960)
- Whitney Chitwood
- Kim Chiu (born 1990)
- Henry Cho (born 1962)
- John Cho (born 1972)
- Margaret Cho (born 1968)
- Jessica Chobot (born 1977)
- Chokoleit (1970–2019)
- Tommy Chong (born 1938)
- Bill Chott (born 1969)
- Stephen Chow (born 1962)
- Paul Chowdhry (born 1974)
- Bridget Christie (born 1971)
- Carmen Christopher (born 1988)
- William Christopher (1932–2016)
- Richard Christy (born 1974)
- Thomas Haden Church (born 1960)
- Papa CJ (born 1977)
- Anthony Clark (1964–2026)
- Blake Clark (born 1946)
- Bobby Clark (1888–1960)
- Laurence Clark (born 1974)
- Mystro Clark (born 1966)
- Lenny Clarke (born 1953)
- Julian Clary (born 1959)
- Andrew "Dice" Clay (born 1957)
- John Cleese (born 1939)
- Ellen Cleghorne (born 1965)
- Jemaine Clement (born 1974)
- Sean Clements (born 1981)
- Charly Clive (born 1993)
- Del Close (1934–1999)
- Jerry Clower (1926–1998)
- Martin Clunes (born 1961)
- Andy Clyde (1892–1967)
- Imogene Coca (1908–2001)
- Michaela Coel (born 1987)
- Denise Coffey (1936–2022)
- Andy Cohen (born 1968)
- Catherine Cohen (born 1991)
- Sacha Baron Cohen (born 1971)
- Mindy Cohn (born 1966)
- Diablo Cody (born 1978)
- Sherry Cola (born 1989)
- Enrico Colantoni (born 1963)
- Stephen Colbert (born 1964)
- Coldmirror (born 1984)
- Deon Cole (born 1972)
- Jenn Colella (born 1974)
- Gary Coleman (1968–2010)
- Jonathan Coleman (1956–2021)
- Kelen Coleman (born 1984)
- Ryan Coleman (born 1991)
- Kim Coles (born 1962)
- Bobby Collins (born 1951)
- Michelle Collins (born 1981)
- Misha Collins (born 1974)
- Mo Collins (born 1965)
- Katy Colloton (born 1984)
- Olivia Colman (born 1974)
- Sarah Colonna (born 1974)
- Michael Colton (born 1975)
- Robbie Coltrane (1950–2022)
- Ray Combs (1956–1996)
- Roisin Conaty (born 1979)
- Pat Condell (born 1949)
- Brian Conley (born 1961)
- Kurtis Conner (born 1994)
- Frank Conniff (born 1956)
- Billy Connolly (born 1942)
- Kevin Connolly (born 1974)
- Adam Conover (born 1983)
- Nina Conti (born 1974)
- Paolo Contis (born 1984)
- Tim Conway (1933–2019)
- Steve Coogan (born 1965)
- Carole Cook (1924–2023)
- Dane Cook (born 1972)
- Kelsey Cook (born 1989)
- Matt Cook (born 1984)
- Peter Cook (1937–1995)
- Josh Cooke (born 1979)
- Danny Cooksey (born 1975)
- Jennifer Coolidge (born 1961)
- Pat Coombs (1926–2002)
- Alex Cooper (born 1994)
- Bradley Cooper (born 1975)
- Calico Cooper (born 1981)
- Charlie Cooper (born 1989)
- Daisy May Cooper (born 1986)
- Pat Cooper (born 1929)
- Sarah Cooper (born 1977)
- Tommy Cooper (1921–1984)
- Alicia Coppola (born 1968)
- Bill Corbett (born 1960)
- Ronnie Corbett (1930–2016)
- Nate Corddry (born 1977)
- Rob Corddry (born 1971)
- James Corden (born 1978)
- Eugene Cordero (born 1978)
- Professor Irwin Corey (1914–2017)
- Joe Cornish (born 1968)
- Judy Cornwell (born 1940)
- Teddy Corpuz
- Pete Correale (born 1970)
- Rebecca Corry (born 1971)
- Bud Cort (1948–2026)
- Paola Cortellesi (born 1973)
- Bill Cosby (born 1937)
- Lou Costello (1906–1959)
- Sue Costello (born 1968)
- Camille Cottin (born 1978)
- Antony Cotton (born 1975)
- Dave Coulier (born 1959)
- Jonathan Coulton (born 1970)
- Eliza Coupe (born 1981)
- Stephanie Courtney (born 1970)
- Allen Covert (born 1964)
- Courteney Cox (born 1964)
- Jennifer Elise Cox (born 1969)
- Nikki Cox (born 1978)
- Wally Cox (1924–1973)
- Carly Craig (born 1980)
- Billy Crawford (born 1982)
- Gavin Crawford (born 1981)
- Lavell Crawford (born 1968)
- Ryan Creamer (born 1992)
- Zach Cregger (born 1980)
- Amanda Crew (born 1986)
- Terry Crews (born 1968)
- Chelsey Crisp (born 1983)
- John Crist (born 1984)
- Affion Crockett (born 1974)
- Ben Crompton (born 1974)
- Mackenzie Crook (born 1971)
- Norm Crosby (1927–2020)
- David Cross (born 1964)
- Trae Crowder (born 1986)
- Lucas Cruikshank (born 1993)
- Hal Cruttenden (born 1969)
- Barry Cryer (1935–2022)
- Jon Cryer (born 1965)
- Billy Crystal (born 1948)
- Ice Cube (born 1969)
- Jeremy Culhane (born 1992)
- Seán Cullen (born 1965)
- Anthony Cumia (born 1961)
- Whitney Cummings (born 1982)
- Dan Cummins (born 1977)
- James Cunningham (born 1973)
- Mark Curry (born 1961)
- Stephen Curry (born 1976)
- Tim Curry (1946–2026)
- Jane Curtin (born 1947)
- Anne Curtis (born 1985)
- Jamie Lee Curtis (born 1958)
- Joan Cusack (born 1962)
- John Cusack (born 1966)
- Jack Cutmore-Scott (born 1987)

=== D ===
- Peter F. Dailey (1868–1908)
- E.G. Daily (born 1961)
- Charlie Dale (1885–1971)
- Jim Dale (born 1935)
- Karl Dall (1941–2020)
- John Francis Daley (born 1985)
- Andrew Daly (born 1971)
- Jon Daly (born 1977)
- Tim Daly (born 1956)
- Bill Dana (1924–2017)
- Rodney Dangerfield (1921–2004)
- Chad Daniels (born 1975)
- Greg Daniels (born 1963)
- Ted Danson (born 1947)
- Dante (born 1970)
- Tony Danza (born 1951)
- Khalid Abbas Dar (born 1955)
- Rhys Darby (born 1974)
- Severn Darden (1929–1995)
- Vir Das (born 1979)
- Hayes Davenport (born 1986)
- Jim David (born 1954)
- Keith David (born 1956)
- Larry David (born 1947)
- Dov Davidoff (born 1973)
- Hugh Davidson
- Jim Davidson (born 1953)
- Pete Davidson (born 1993)
- Alan Davies (born 1966)
- Greg Davies (born 1968)
- Ann B. Davis (1926–2014)
- Clifton Davis (born 1945)
- Daniel Davis (born 1945)
- DeRay Davis (born 1982)
- Geena Davis (born 1956)
- Jeff B. Davis (born 1973)
- Julia Davis (born 1966)
- Kristin Davis (born 1965)
- LaVan Davis (born 1966)
- Lucy Davis (born 1973)
- Matt Davis (born 1979)
- Nore Davis (born 1984)
- Tanyalee Davis (born 1970)
- Tom Davis (born 1979)
- Tom Davis (1952–2012)
- Ken Davitian (born 1953)
- Richard Dawson (1932–2012)
- Les Dawson (1931–1993)
- Shane Dawson (born 1988)
- Charlie Day (born 1976)
- Dennis Day (1916–1988)
- Felicia Day (born 1979)
- Mikey Day (born 1980)
- Andy de la Tour (born 1954)
- Ai-Ai delas Alas (born 1964)
- Larry Dean (born 1989)
- Mark DeCarlo (born 1962)
- Frank DeCaro (born 1962)
- Enchong Dee (born 1988)
- Gerry Dee (born 1968)
- Jack Dee (born 1962)
- Rob Deering (born 1972)
- Rick Dees (born 1950)
- Eddie Deezen (born 1957)
- Ellen DeGeneres (born 1958)
- Vance DeGeneres (born 1954)
- Neil Delamere (born 1980)
- Rob Delaney (born 1977)
- Lea DeLaria (born 1958)
- Jessica Delfino (born 1976)
- Chris D'Elia (born 1980)
- Joey de Leon (born 1946)
- Grey DeLisle (born 1973)
- Bianca Del Rio (born 1975)
- Dana DeLorenzo (born 1983)
- David DeLuise (born 1971)
- Dom DeLuise (1933–2009)
- Ivor Dembina (born 1951)
- Dr. Demento (born 1941)
- D.J. Demers (born 1986)
- Jamie Demetriou (born 1987)
- Natasia Demetriou (born 1984)
- Dustin Demri-Burns (born 1978)
- Lori Beth Denberg (born 1976)
- Jamie Denbo (born 1973)
- Kat Dennings (born 1986)
- Gabrielle Dennis (born 1981)
- Hugh Dennis (born 1962)
- Les Dennis (born 1953)
- Bob Denver (1935–2005)
- Joe DeRita (1909–1993)
- Joe DeRosa (born 1977)
- Portia de Rossi (born 1973)
- Zooey Deschanel (born 1980)
- Jack DeSena (born 1987)
- Mike DeStefano (1966–2011)
- Patti Deutsch (1943–2017)
- Chelsea Devantez
- Adam DeVine (born 1983)
- Danny DeVito (born 1944)
- Tommy Dewey (born 1978)
- Joyce DeWitt (born 1949)
- Eugenio Derbez (born 1961)
- Dustin Diamond (1977–2021)
- Chris Diamantopoulos (born 1975)
- Joey Diaz (born 1963)
- Ogie Diaz (born 1970)
- Vic DiBitetto (born 1961)
- Andy Dick (born 1965)
- Daniel Dickey (born 1986)
- John Di Domenico (born 1962)
- Dominic Dierkes (born 1984)
- Richard Digance (born 1949)
- Debra DiGiovanni (born 1972)
- Wendy van Dijk (born 1971)
- Phyllis Diller (1917–2012)
- Brooke Dillman (born 1966)
- Kevin Dillon (born 1965)
- Tim Dillon (born 1985)
- John DiMaggio (born 1968)
- Amelia Dimoldenberg (born 1994)
- David Dineen-Porter (born 1979)
- Paul Dinello (born 1962)
- Juan Pablo Di Pace (born 1979)
- Nick DiPaolo (born 1962)
- Katie Dippold (born 1980)
- Andrew Dismukes (born 1995)
- Chris Distefano (born 1984)
- Olli Dittrich (born 1956)
- Omid Djalili (born 1965)
- Anh Do (born 1977)
- David Dobrik (born 1996)
- Nik Dodani (born 1993)
- Ken Dodd (1927–2018)
- Mark Dolan (born 1974)
- Dolphy (1928–2012)
- Eugene Domingo (born 1971)
- Joel Dommett (born 1985)
- Declan Donnelly (born 1975)
- Kether Donohue (born 1985)
- Lisa Donovan (born 1980)
- Tate Donovan (born 1963)
- Paul Dooley (born 1928)
- Jimmy Dore (born 1965)
- Jon Dore (born 1975)
- Jeff Doucette (born 1947)
- Doug E. Doug (born 1970)
- Donna Douglas (1932–2015)
- Jack Douglass (born 1988)
- Beth Dover (born 1978)
- John Dowie (born 1950)
- Jim Downey (born 1952)
- Paul W. Downs (born 1982)
- Brian Doyle-Murray (born 1945)
- Charlie Drake (1925–2006)
- Larry Drake (1949–2016)
- Ruth Draper (1884–1956)
- Rachel Dratch (born 1966)
- Tom Dreesen (1939–2026)
- Fran Drescher (born 1957)
- Marie Dressler (1868–1934)
- James Dreyfus (born 1968)
- Richard Dreyfuss (1947)
- Anna Drezen
- Celeste Dring (born 1989)
- Drew Droege
- Mike Drucker (born 1984)
- Ryan Drummond (born 1973)
- Druski (born 1994)
- Eric Drysdale (born 1969)
- Rebecca Drysdale (born 1978/1979)
- Rick Ducommun (1952–2015)
- Julia Duffy (born 1951)
- Dennis Dugan (born 1946)
- Christian Duguay (born 1970)
- Josh Duhamel (born 1972)
- Jean Dujardin (born 1972)
- Clark Duke (born 1985)
- Patty Duke (1946–2016)
- Robin Duke (born 1954)
- Michael Clarke Duncan (1957–2012)
- Sandy Duncan (born 1946)
- Shane Dundas (born 1959)
- Jeff Dunham (born 1962)
- Lena Dunham (born 1986)
- Barbara Dunkelman (born 1989)
- Colton Dunn (born 1977)
- Gabe Dunn (born 1988)
- George Dunn (1914–1982)
- Jimmy Dunn
- Nora Dunn (born 1952)
- Ryan Dunn (1977–2011)
- Kyle Dunnigan (born 1971)
- Debbe Dunning (born 1966)
- Alex Duong (1984–2026)
- Jay Duplass (born 1973)
- Mark Duplass (born 1976)
- Elvis Duran (born 1964)
- Jimmy Durante (1893–1980)
- Sanjay Dutt (born 1959)
- Clea DuVall (born 1977)
- Shelley Duvall (1949–2024)
- Bil Dwyer (born 1962)
- Jeff Dye (born 1983)
- Harriet Dyer (born 1988)
- Rob Dyrdek (born 1974)
- Jeremy Dyson (born 1966)

=== E ===
- Open Mike Eagle (born 1980)
- Jason Earles (born 1977)
- John Early (born 1988)
- Christine Ebersole (born 1953)
- Buddy Ebsen (1908–2003)
- Chris Eckert (born 1986)
- Lisa Eckhart (born 1992)
- Costaki Economopoulos (born 1965)
- Paul Eddington (1927–1995)
- Ayo Edebiri (born 1995)
- Alex Edelman (born 1989)
- Eric Edelstein (born 1977)
- Lisa Edelstein (born 1966)
- Barbara Eden (born 1931)
- Ade Edmondson (born 1957)
- Allegra Edwards (born 1988)
- Dean Edwards (born 1970)
- Derek Edwards (born 1958)
- Ian Edwards
- Justin Edwards (born 1972)
- Adam Eget (born 1979)
- Christian Ehring (born 1972)
- Billy Eichner (born 1978)
- Hannah Einbinder (born 1995)
- Bob Einstein (1942–2019)
- Rich Eisen (born 1969)
- Ophira Eisenberg (born 1972)
- Naomi Ekperigin (born 1983)
- Malik Elassal (born 1996)
- Kevin Eldon (born 1959)
- Jenna Elfman (born 1971)
- Laurie Elliot (born 1971)
- Abby Elliott (born 1987)
- Bob Elliott (1923–2016)
- Bridey Elliott (born 1990)
- Chris Elliott (born 1960)
- Francis Ellis (comedian) (born 1989)
- Mary Elizabeth Ellis (born 1979)
- Gad Elmaleh (born 1971)
- Ethan Embry (born 1978)
- Dick Emery (1915–1983)
- Harry Enfield (born 1961)
- Georgia Engel (1948–2019)
- Anke Engelke (born 1965)
- Bill Engvall (born 1957)
- John Ennis
- Maymay Entrata (born 1997)
- Mike Epps (born 1970)
- Molly Erdman (born 1974)
- Heinz Erhardt (1909–1979)
- Paco Erhard (born 1975)
- Andy Erikson (born 1987)
- R. Lee Ermey (1944–2018)
- Leon Errol (1881–1951)
- Blaire Erskine (born 1991)
- Maya Erskine (born 1987)
- Cole Escola (born 1986)
- Ennis Esmer (born 1978)
- Felipe Esparza (born 1970)
- Cameron Esposito (born 1981)
- Charles Esten (born 1965)
- Chris Estrada
- Karla Estrada (born 1974)
- Amber Lee Ettinger (born 1982)
- Chris Evans (born 1966)
- Lee Evans (born 1964)
- Sean Evans (born 1986)
- Bridget Everett (born 1972)
- Kenny Everett (1944–1995)
- Justine Ezarik (born 1984)

=== F ===
- Ana Fabrega (born 1991)
- Jackie Fabulous (born 1970)
- Josh Fadem (born 1980)
- Bill Fagerbakke (born 1957)
- Damien Fahey (born 1980)
- Donald Faison (born 1974)
- Jimmy Fallon (born 1974)
- Richard Fancy (born 1943)
- Emanuela Fanelli (born 1986)
- Simon Fanshawe (born 1956)
- Ali Farahnakian (born 1967)
- Anna Faris (born 1976)
- Chris Farley (1964–1997)
- John Farley (born 1968)
- Kevin Farley (born 1965)
- Bill Farmer (born 1952)
- Simon Farnaby (born 1973)
- Jamie Farr (born 1934)
- Bobby Farrelly (born 1958)
- Peter Farrelly (born 1956)
- Negin Farsad (born 1978)
- Mitch Fatel (born 1968)
- David Faustino (born 1974)
- Jon Favreau (born 1966)
- Nat Faxon (born 1975)
- Isabel Fay (born 1979)
- Joey Faye (1909–1997)
- Helga Feddersen (1930–1990)
- Wayne Federman (born 1959)
- Paul Feig (born 1962)
- Fortune Feimster (born 1980)
- Rachel Feinstein (born 1981)
- Ben Feldman (born 1980)
- David Feldman
- Liz Feldman (born 1977)
- Marty Feldman (1934–1982)
- Beanie Feldstein (born 1993)
- Graham Fellowes (born 1959)
- Randy Feltface (born 1980)
- Spike Feresten (born 1964)
- Craig Ferguson (born 1962)
- Don Ferguson (born 1946)
- Jay R. Ferguson (born 1974)
- Jesse Tyler Ferguson (born 1975)
- Keith Ferguson (born 1972)
- Shelby Fero (born 1993)
- Adam Ferrara (born 1966)
- Jerry Ferrara (born 1979)
- America Ferrera (born 1984)
- Conchata Ferrell (1943–2020)
- Will Ferrell (born 1967)
- Herbert Feuerstein (1937–2020)
- Tina Fey (born 1970)
- Sally Field (born 1946)
- Nathan Fielder (born 1983)
- Michael Fielding (born 1982)
- Noel Fielding (born 1973)
- Totie Fields (1930–1978)
- W. C. Fields (1880–1946)
- Nathan Fillion (born 1971)
- Larry Fine (1902–1975)
- Chloe Fineman (born 1988)
- Christian Finnegan (born 1973)
- Katie Finneran (born 1971)
- Dan Finnerty (born 1970)
- Kathryn Fiore (born 1979)
- Jo Firestone (born 1987)
- Jordan Firstman (born 1991)
- Mark Fischbach (aka) Markiplier (born 1989)
- Jenna Fischer (born 1974)
- Danielle Fishel (born 1981)
- Joely Fisher (born 1967)
- Lang Fisher (born 1980)
- Miles Fisher (born 1983)
- Greg Fitzsimmons (born 1966)
- Fannie Flagg (born 1944)
- Joe Flaherty (1941–2024)
- Crista Flanagan (born 1976)
- Tom Flanigan
- Kate Flannery (born 1964)
- Charles Fleischer (born 1950)
- Chris Fleming (born 1987)
- Jim Florentine (born 1964)
- Neil Flynn (born 1960)
- Nathan Foad (born 1992)
- Jake Fogelnest (born 1979)
- Dan Fogler (born 1976)
- Lisa Foiles (born 1986)
- Dave Foley (born 1963)
- Mick Foley (born 1965)
- Evan Fong (aka) Vanoss (born 1992)
- Paul Foot (born 1973)
- Jason Forbes (born 1990)
- Faith Ford (born 1964)
- Paul Ford (1901–1976)
- Thomas Mikal Ford (1964–2016)
- Matt Forde (born 1982)
- Jay Foreman (born 1984)
- Joey Forman (1929–1982)
- George Formby (1904–1961)
- George Formby Sr. (1875–1921)
- Will Forte (born 1970)
- Kat Foster (born 1978)
- Phil Foster (1913–1985)
- George Fouracres (born 1990)
- Jermaine Fowler (born 1988)
- Jimmy Fowlie (born 1985)
- Kirk Fox (born 1969)
- Megan Fox (born 1986)
- Michael J. Fox (born 1961)
- Zack Fox (born 1990)
- Jeff Foxworthy (born 1958)
- Jamie Foxx (born 1967)
- Redd Foxx (1922–1991)
- Deborah Frances-White (born 1967)
- Leigh Francis (born 1974)
- Stewart Francis (born 1964)
- Jason Francisco (born 1987)
- Pablo Francisco (born 1974)
- Dave Franco (born 1985)
- Eduardo Franco (born 1994)
- James Franco (born 1978)
- Al Franken (born 1951)
- Bonnie Franklin (1944–2013)
- Marina Franklin
- Nelson Franklin (born 1985)
- Daniel Franzese (born 1978)
- Alice Fraser
- William Frawley (1887–1966)
- Stan Freberg (1926–2015)
- Gavin Free (born 1988)
- Travon Free (born 1985)
- Cate Freedman
- Martin Freeman (born 1971)
- Jared Freid (born 1985)
- Dawn French (born 1957)
- Matt Frewer (born 1958)
- Lucy Freyer (born 1996)
- Adam Friedland (born 1987)
- Judah Friedlander (born 1969)
- Will Friedle (born 1976)
- Budd Friedman (1932–2022)
- Jena Friedman (born 1983)
- Matt Friend (born 1998)
- Annette Frier (born 1974)
- Leon Frierson (born 1986)
- Don Friesen
- Freddie Frinton (1909–1968)
- Rebecca Front (born 1964)
- David Frost (1939–2013)
- Nick Frost (born 1972)
- Stephen Fry (born 1957)
- Pamela Fryman (born 1959)
- Daisy Fuentes (born 1966)
- John Fugelsang (born 1969)
- Rich Fulcher (born 1968)
- Kurt Fuller (born 1953)
- Ned Fulmer (born 1987)
- Ziwe Fumudoh (born 1992)
- Ron Funches (born 1983)
- Brittany Furlan (born 1986)
- Fakkah Fuzz (born 1986)

=== G ===
- Eva Gabor (1919–1995)
- Jon Gabrus (born 1982)
- Josh Gad (born 1981)
- Richard Gadd (born 1989)
- Hannah Gadsby (born 1978)
- Jim Gaffigan (born 1966)
- Mo Gaffney (born 1958)
- Megan Gailey (born 1986)
- M.C. Gainey (born 1948)
- Jayson Gainza (born 1980)
- Daniele Gaither (born 1970)
- Johnny Galecki (born 1975)
- Zach Galifianakis (born 1969)
- Gallagher (1946–2022)
- Brian Gallivan
- Sue Galloway
- Mayce Galoni (born 1994)
- Ed Gamble (born 1986)
- Joross Gamboa (born 1984)
- Megan Ganz (born 1984)
- Robert Ben Garant (born 1970)
- Anna Garcia (born 1995)
- Jeffrey Garcia (1975–2025)
- Jorge Garcia (born 1973)
- Billy Gardell (born 1969)
- Graeme Garden (born 1943)
- Blanche Gardin (born 1977)
- Brother Dave Gardner (1926–1983)
- Heidi Gardner (born 1983)
- Pete Gardner
- Tony Gardner (born 1964)
- Zarna Garg (born 1975)
- Jeff Garlin (born 1962)
- Ralph Garman (born 1964)
- Paul Garner (1909–2004)
- Janeane Garofalo (born 1964)
- Teri Garr (1944–2024)
- Betty Garrett (1919–2011)
- Brad Garrett (born 1960)
- Susie Garrett (1929–2002)
- Kyle Gass (born 1960)
- Ana Gasteyer (born 1967)
- Alison Gates (born 1988/1989)
- Kimmy Gatewood
- Mark Gatiss (born 1966)
- Joe Gatto (born 1976)
- Ryan Gaul (born 1973)
- Richard Gautier (1931–2017)
- Joey Gay (born 1971)
- George Gaynes (1917–2016)
- Dustin Gee (1942–1986)
- Chris Geere (born 1981)
- Brett Gelman (born 1976)
- John Gemberling (born 1981)
- Genevieve (1920–2004)
- Steve Gerben (born 1990)
- Tom Gerhardt (born 1957)
- Ricky Gervais (born 1961)
- Chris Gethard (born 1980)
- Estelle Getty (1923–2008)
- Alice Ghostley (1923–2007)
- Tom Gianas
- Angela Giarratana (born 1993)
- Janno Gibbs (born 1969)
- Marla Gibbs (born 1931)
- Erin Gibson
- Kathie Lee Gifford (born 1953)
- Billy Gilbert (1894–1971)
- Brian David Gilbert (born 1994)
- Rhod Gilbert (born 1968)
- Russell Gilbert (born 1959)
- Sara Gilbert (born 1975)
- Kevin Gillese (born 1980)
- Terry Gilliam (born 1940)
- Mo Gilligan (born 1988)
- Shane Gillis (born 1987)
- Paul Gilmartin (born 1963)
- Ewen Gilmour (1963–2014)
- Lisa Gilroy (born 1989)
- Greg Giraldo (1965–2010)
- Adele Givens (born 1960)
- Jon Glaser (born 1968)
- Nikki Glaser (born 1984)
- Ira Glass (born 1959)
- Todd Glass (born 1964)
- Rick Glassman (born 1984)
- Ilana Glazer (born 1987)
- Jackie Gleason (1916–1987)
- Amy Gledhill
- Tom Gleeson (born 1974)
- Ben Gleib (born 1978)
- Donald Glover (aka) Childish Gambino (born 1983)
- Stephen Glover (aka) Steve-O (born 1974)
- GloZell (born 1972)
- George Gobel (1919–1991)
- Godfrey (born 1969)
- Janey Godley (1961–2024)
- Paul Goebel (born 1968)
- Loyiso Gola (born 1983)
- Judy Gold (born 1962)
- Adam Goldberg (born 1970)
- Adam F. Goldberg (born 1976)
- Andrew Goldberg (born 1978)
- Evan Goldberg (born 1982)
- Whoopi Goldberg (born 1955)
- Brett Goldstein (born 1980)
- Jonathan Goldstein (born 1968)
- Bobcat Goldthwait (born 1962)
- Dallas Goldtooth (born 1983)
- Ian Gomez (born 1964)
- Roberto Gómez Bolaños (Chespirito) (1929–2014)
- Josh Gondelman (born 1985)
- Jami Gong (born 1969)
- Alex Gonzaga (born 1988)
- Ginger Gonzaga (born 1983)
- Jackie Gonzaga (born 1994)
- Toni Gonzaga (born 1984)
- Danny Gonzalez (born 1994)
- Cuba Gooding Jr. (born 1968)
- Omar Gooding (born 1976)
- John Goodman (born 1952)
- Ken Goodwin (1933–2012)
- Dan Goor (born 1975)
- Leo Gorcey (1917–1969)
- Joseph Gordon-Levitt (born 1981)
- Christopher Gorham (born 1974)
- Dave Gorman (born 1971)
- Frank Gorshin (1933–2005)
- Freeman Gosden (1899–1982)
- Mark-Paul Gosselaar (born 1974)
- Gilbert Gottfried (1955–2022)
- Theodore Gottlieb (1906–2001)
- Dana Gould (born 1964)
- Sandra Gould (1916–1999)
- Ray Goulding (1922–1990)
- Sal Governale (born 1968)
- Luba Goy (born 1945)
- Chris Grace
- Jeff Grace
- Topher Grace (born 1978)
- Boothby Graffoe (born 1962)
- Heather Graham (born 1970)
- Matt Graham
- Kelsey Grammer (born 1955)
- Charlie Grandy (born 1974)
- Fred Grandy (born 1948)
- Bob Grant (1932–2003)
- Corinne Grant (born 1973)
- David Grant (born 1956)
- Stephen Grant (born 1973)
- Judy Graubart (born 1943)
- Ari Graynor (born 1983)
- Hank Green (born 1980)
- Jeff Green (born 1964)
- Seth Green (born 1974)
- Tom Green (born 1971)
- Bryan Greenberg (born 1978)
- Shecky Greene (1926–2023)
- Max Greenfield (born 1979)
- Kathy Greenwood (born 1962)
- Judy Greer (born 1975)
- Melvin Gregg (born 1988)
- Dan Gregor (born 1984)
- Dick Gregory (1932–2017)
- James Gregory (born 1946)
- Tamsin Greig (born 1966)
- Jon Gries (born 1957)
- Adrian Grenier (born 1976)
- Stacey Grenrock-Woods (born 1975)
- David Alan Grier (born 1956)
- Erik Griffin (born 1972)
- Eddie Griffin (born 1968)
- Kathy Griffin (born 1960)
- Nick Griffin (born 1966)
- Andy Griffith (1926–2012)
- Scott Grimes (born 1971)
- Todd Grinnell (born 1976)
- Asher Grodman (born 1987)
- Charles Grodin (1935–2021)
- Matt Groening (born 1954)
- David Groh (1939–2008)
- Kirsten Gronfield (born 1977)
- Mary Gross (born 1953)
- Michael Gross (born 1947)
- Noah Grossman (born 1997)
- Peter Grosz (born 1974)
- Rene Gube (born 1979)
- Matthew Gray Gubler (born 1980)
- Yamyam Gucong (born 1993)
- Christopher Guest (born 1948)
- Patty Guggenheim (born 1984)
- Ariana Guido (born 1999)
- Ann Morgan Guilbert (1928–2016)
- Robert Guillaume (1927–2017)
- Harvey Guillen (born 1990)
- Ingrid Guimarães (born 1972)
- Gary Gulman (born 1970)
- Appurv Gupta (born 1990)
- Broti Gupta (born 1993)
- Annabelle Gurwitch (born 1961)
- Björn Gustafsson (born 1986)
- Greg Gutfeld (born 1964)
- Steve Guttenberg (born 1958)
- Deryck Guyler (1914–1999)

=== H ===
- Damien Haas (born 1990)
- Keith Habersberger (born 1987)
- Buddy Hackett (1924–2003)
- Tiffany Haddish (born 1979)
- Bill Hader (born 1978)
- Sarah Hadland (born 1971)
- Jenny Hagel
- Hallie Haglund (born 1982)
- Meredith Hagner (born 1987)
- Kathryn Hahn (born 1973)
- Tony Hale (born 1970)
- Brian Haley (born 1961)
- Jack Haley (1897–1979)
- Stavros Halkias (born 1989)
- Anthony Michael Hall (born 1968)
- Brad Hall (born 1958)
- Brandon Micheal Hall (born 1993)
- Daheli Hall (born 1976)
- Huntz Hall (1919–1999)
- Rich Hall (born 1954)
- Dieter Hallervorden (born 1935)
- Katie Halper (born 1980)
- Evelyn Hamann (1942–2007)
- Neil Hamburger (born 1967)
- Argus Hamilton
- Lloyd Hamilton (1891–1935)
- Ryan Hamilton (born 1976)
- Jon Hamm (born 1971)
- Darrell Hammond (born 1955)
- Nick Hancock (born 1962)
- Tony Hancock (1924–1968)
- Jack Handey (born 1949)
- Chelsea Handler (born 1975)
- Colin Hanks (born 1977)
- Tom Hanks (born 1956)
- Gabbie Hanna (born 1991)
- Alyson Hannigan (born 1974)
- Ryan Hansen (born 1981)
- Malcolm Hardee (1950–2005)
- Brandon Hardesty (born 1987)
- Mike Harding (born 1944)
- Chris Hardwick (born 1971)
- Johnny Hardwick (1958–2023)
- Jeremy Hardy (1961–2019)
- Oliver Hardy (1890–1957)
- Allana Harkin
- Otis Harlan (1865–1940)
- Dan Harmon (born 1973)
- Tim Harmston (born 1971/1972)
- Valerie Harper (1939–2019)
- William Jackson Harper (born 1980)
- Neil Patrick Harris (born 1973)
- Rachael Harris (born 1968)
- Robin Harris (1953–1990)
- Blake Harrison (born 1985)
- Bret Harrison (born 1982)
- Patti Harrison (born 1990)
- Hannah Hart (born 1986)
- Kevin Hart (born 1979)
- Mamrie Hart (born 1983)
- Melissa Joan Hart (born 1976)
- Miranda Hart (born 1972)
- Adam Hartle (born 1979)
- Phil Hartman (1948–1998)
- Steve Harvey (born 1957)
- Ian Harvie
- Murtaza Hassan (1965–2011)
- Paul Walter Hauser (born 1986)
- Allan Havey (born 1954)
- Kali Hawk (born 1986)
- Tim Hawkins (born 1968)
- Tony Hawks (born 1960)
- Goldie Hawn (born 1945)
- Charles Hawtrey (1858–1923)
- Charles Hawtrey (1914–1988)
- Will Hay (1888–1949)
- Richard Haydn (1905–1985)
- Erinn Hayes (born 1976)
- Sean Hayes (born 1970)
- Mike Hayley
- Natalie Haynes (born 1974)
- Ted Healy (1896–1937)
- Richard Hearne (1890–1987)
- Caleb Hearon (born 1995)
- Patricia Heaton (born 1958)
- Ian Hecox (born 1987)
- Mitch Hedberg (1968–2005)
- Jon Heder (born 1977)
- Briga Heelan (born 1987)
- Bobby Heenan (1943–2017)
- Kevin Heffernan (born 1968)
- John Heffron (born 1970)
- John Hegley (born 1953)
- Robert Hegyes (1951–2012)
- Tim Heidecker (born 1976)
- Jesse Heiman (born 1978)
- Hans-Joachim Heist (born 1949)
- Simon Helberg (born 1980)
- Grace Helbig (born 1985)
- Emily Heller (born 1985)
- Peter Helliar (born 1975)
- Nick Helm (born 1980)
- Katherine Helmond (1929–2019)
- Ed Helms (born 1974)
- Greg Hemphill (born 1969)
- Shirley Hemphill (1947–1999)
- Sherman Hemsley (1938–2012)
- Dickie Henderson (1922–1985)
- Christina Hendricks (born 1975)
- Elaine Hendrix (born 1970)
- Vic Henley (1962–2020)
- Marilu Henner (born 1952)
- Carolyn Hennesy (born 1962)
- Buck Henry (1930–2020)
- Ely Henry (born 1991)
- Lenny Henry (born 1958)
- Mike Henry (born 1965)
- John Henton (born 1960)
- Dai Henwood (born 1978)
- Hugh Herbert (1884–1952)
- Christoph Maria Herbst (born 1966)
- Martin Herlihy (born 1998)
- Tim Herlihy (born 1966)
- David Herman (born 1967)
- Thomas Hermanns (born 1963)
- Marcello Hernández (born 1997)
- Mark Herras (born 1986)
- Richard Herring (born 1967)
- Edward Herrmann (1943–2014)
- Seth Herzog (born 1970)
- Howard Hesseman (1940–2022)
- Bill Hicks (1961–1994)
- Ryan Higa (born 1990)
- David Anthony Higgins (born 1961)
- John Higgins (born 1995)
- John Michael Higgins (born 1963)
- Maeve Higgins
- Steve Higgins (born 1963)
- Jhong Hilario (born 1976)
- Jess Hilarious (born 1992)
- Dieter Hildebrandt (1927–2013)
- Amy Hill (born 1953)
- Bec Hill (born 1986)
- Benny Hill (1924–1992)
- Dave Hill (born 1974)
- Dulé Hill (born 1975)
- Ed Hill (born 1984)
- Harry Hill (born 1964)
- Jonah Hill (born 1983)
- Martina Hill (born 1974)
- Melinda Hill (born 1972)
- Murray Hill
- Thelma Hill (1906–1938)
- Tymberlee Hill
- Jeff Hiller
- Adam Hills (born 1970)
- Tony Hinchcliffe (born 1984)
- Cheryl Hines (born 1965)
- Gregory Hines (1946–2003)
- Skip Hinnant (born 1940)
- Michael Hitchcock (born 1958)
- Thora Hird (1911–2003)
- Justin Hires (born 1985)
- Judd Hirsch (born 1935)
- Matt Hobby (born 1985)
- Stephanie Hodge (born 1956)
- Jessy Hodges (born 1986)
- John Hodgman (born 1971)
- Joel Hodgson (born 1960)
- Jackie Hoffman (born 1960)
- Robby Hoffman (born 1989)
- Gaby Hoffmann (born 1982)
- Steve Hofstetter (born 1979)
- Chris Hogan (born 1970)
- Hulk Hogan (1953–2025)
- Paul Hogan (born 1939)
- Siobhan Fallon Hogan (born 1961)
- Amy Hoggart (born 1986)
- Corey Holcomb (born 1969)
- Dominic Holland (born 1967)
- Mary Holland (born 1985)
- Judy Holliday (1921–1965)
- Vanessa Hollingshead
- Stanley Holloway (1890–1982)
- Anders Holm (born 1981)
- Chelsea Holmes (born 1993/1994)
- Dave Holmes (born 1971)
- Eamonn Holmes (born 1959)
- Jessica Holmes (born 1973)
- Pete Holmes (born 1979)
- Todd Holoubek (born 1969)
- Lauren Holt (born 1991)
- Helen Hong (born 1985)
- James Hong (born 1929)
- Brian Hooks (born 1974)
- Jan Hooks (1957–2014)
- Bob Hope (1903–2003)
- Sharon Horgan (born 1970)
- Alex Horne (born 1978)
- Kenneth Horne (1907–1969)
- Mathew Horne (born 1978)
- Alex Kapp Horner (born 1969)
- David Hornsby (born 1975)
- Don Hornsby (1924–1950)
- Jane Horrocks (born 1964)
- Lutz van der Horst (born 1975)
- Edward Everett Horton (1886–1970)
- Richard Steven Horvitz (born 1966)
- Curly Howard (1903–1952)
- Frankie Howerd (1917–1992)
- Ken Howard (1944–2016)
- Kyle Howard (born 1978)
- Moe Howard (1897–1975)
- Ron Howard (born 1954)
- Russell Howard (born 1980)
- Shemp Howard (1895–1955)
- Kirby Howell-Baptiste (born 1987)
- Glenn Howerton (born 1976)
- Lil Rel Howery (born 1979)
- Brianne Howey (born 1989)
- Jeremy Hotz (born 1966)
- Roy Hudd (1936–2020)
- Oliver Hudson (born 1976)
- Rob Huebel (born 1969)
- Akilah Hughes (born 1989)
- Dave Hughes (born 1970)
- Gregg Hughes (born 1963)
- John Hughes (1950–2009)
- London Hughes (born 1989)
- Sean Hughes (1965–2017)
- Steve Hughes (born 1966)
- D. L. Hughley (born 1963)
- Bella Hull
- Daniel Humbarger
- Barry Humphries (1934–2023)
- Bonnie Hunt (born 1961)
- Brendan Hunt (born 1972)
- Bill Hunter (1940–2011)
- Reginald D. Hunter (born 1969)
- David Huntsberger (born 1979)
- Michelle Hurd (born 1966)
- Carl Hurley (born 1941)
- Elizabeth Hurley (born 1965)
- Lillian Hurst (born 1943)
- Jake Hurwitz (born 1985)
- Jon Hurwitz (born 1977)
- Brian Huskey (born 1968)
- Toby Huss (born 1966)
- Warren Hutcherson (born 1963)
- Melanie Hutsell (born 1968)
- Betty Hutton (1921–2007)
- Sam Hyde (born 1985)
- Jessica Hynes (born 1972)
- Steve Hytner (born 1959)

=== I ===
- Paul Iacono (born 1988)
- Sal Iacono (born 1971)
- Armando Iannucci (born 1963)
- Adrienne Iapalucci
- Eric Idle (born 1943)
- Eddie Ifft (born 1974)
- Gabriel Iglesias (born 1976)
- Gbemisola Ikumelo (born 1986)
- Sabrina Impacciatore (born 1968)
- Celia Imrie (born 1952)
- Robin Ince (born 1969)
- Jack Innanen (born 1999)
- Neil Innes (1944–2019)
- Scott Innes (born 1966)
- Tino Insana (1948–2017)
- Dom Irrera (born 1948)
- Bill Irwin (born 1950)
- Matt Iseman (born 1971)
- Harith Iskander (born 1966)
- Troy Iwata (born 1991)
- Eddie Izzard (born 1962)

=== J ===
- Aaron Jackson
- Brandon T. Jackson (born 1984)
- Marc Evan Jackson (born 1970)
- Shantira Jackson
- Victoria Jackson (born 1959)
- Manny Jacinto (born 1987)
- Gillian Jacobs (born 1982)
- Abbi Jacobson (born 1984)
- Jon Jafari (aka) JonTron (born 1990)
- Javed Jaffrey (born 1963)
- T.J. Jagodowski (born 1971)
- Gerburg Jahnke (born 1955)
- Sabrina Jalees (born 1985)
- Billy T. James (1948–1991)
- Elis James (born 1980)
- Greg James (born 1985)
- Janelle James (born 1979)
- Kevin James (born 1965)
- Rhys James (born 1991)
- Nick Jameson (born 1948)
- Jameela Jamil (born 1986)
- Gary Janetti (born 1966)
- Alia Janine (born 1978)
- Michael Patrick Jann (born 1970)
- Allison Janney (born 1959)
- Zoe Jarman (born 1982)
- David Jason (born 1940)
- Jay Jason (1915–2001)
- Morgan Jay (born 1987)
- Sam Jay (born 1982)
- Kavin Jayaram (born 1980)
- Jim Jefferies (born 1977)
- Richard Jeni (1957–2007)
- Ken Jeong (born 1969)
- Anthony Jeselnik (born 1978)
- Michael Jeter (1952–2003)
- Geri Jewell (born 1956)
- Penn Jillette (born 1955)
- Andrea Jin (born 1996)
- Maz Jobrani (born 1972)
- Jake Johannsen (born 1960)
- Anjelah Johnson (born 1982)
- Anthony Johnson (1966–2021)
- Chic Johnson (1891–1962)
- Daran Johnson (born 1988)
- Jake Johnson (born 1978)
- James Austin Johnson (born 1989)
- Josh Johnson (born 1990)
- Lia Marie Johnson (born 1996)
- Nicole Randall Johnson (born 1973)
- Punkie Johnson (born 1985)
- Rebekka Johnson
- Slink Johnson
- Zainab Johnson
- Jay Johnston (born 1968)
- Kristen Johnston (born 1967)
- Brandon Scott Jones (born 1984)
- "Hamburger" Jones
- Jason Jones (born 1973)
- Leslie Jones (born 1967)
- Luka Jones (born 1975)
- Matt Jones (born 1981)
- Orlando Jones (born 1968)
- Rashida Jones (born 1976)
- Shirley Jones (born 1934)
- Terry Jones (1942–2020)
- Leslie Jordan (1955–2022)
- Lesley Joseph (born 1945)
- Colin Jost (born 1982)
- Mitra Jouhari (born 1992)
- Jesse Joyce (born 1978)
- Mario Joyner (born 1961)
- Tom Joyner (born 1949)
- Cledus T. Judd (born 1964)
- Mike Judge (born 1962)
- Andy Juett (born 1977)
- Jugs Jugueta (born 1979)
- Phill Jupitus (born 1962)
- Peter Jurasik (born 1950)
- Jay Jurden (born 1988)

=== K ===
- Daniel Kaluuya (born 1989)
- Madeline Kahn (1942–1999)
- Bess Kalb (born 1987)
- Jamie Kaler (born 1964)
- Mindy Kaling (born 1979)
- Adhir Kalyan (born 1983)
- Gatis Kandis (born 1981)
- Carol Kane (born 1952)
- Russell Kane (born 1975)
- Gabe Kaplan (born 1945)
- Myq Kaplan (born 1978)
- Fabiana Karla (born 1975)
- J. P. Karliak (born 1981)
- Uğur Rıfat Karlova (born 1980)
- Ian Karmel (born 1984)
- Richard Karn (born 1956)
- Aaron Karo (born 1979)
- Jensen Karp (born 1979)
- Moshe Kasher (born 1979)
- Jackie Kashian (born 1963)
- John Kassir (born 1957)
- Rosanne Katon (born 1954)
- Sierra Katow (born 1994)
- Chris Kattan (born 1970)
- Jonathan Katz (born 1946)
- Mickey Katz (1909–1985)
- Andy Kaufman (1949–1984)
- Julie Kavner (born 1950)
- Peter Kay (born 1973)
- Phil Kay (born 1969)
- Spencer Kayden (born 1971)
- Danny Kaye (1911–1987)
- Paul Kaye (born 1964)
- Stubby Kaye (1918–1997)
- Samson Kayo (born 1991)
- Zoe Kazan (born 1983)
- Molly Kearney (born 1992)
- Diane Keaton (1946–2025)
- Michael Keaton (born 1951)
- Carolin Kebekus (born 1980)
- Jared Keeso (born 1984)
- Garrison Keillor (born 1942)
- John Keister (born 1956)
- Penelope Keith (1940–2026)
- Peter Kelamis (born 1967)
- Echo Kellum (born 1982)
- Chris Kelly (born 1983)
- Frank Kelly (1938–2016)
- Martha Kelly (born 1968)
- Patsy Kelly (1910–1981)
- Robert Kelly (born 1970)
- Pert Kelton (1907–1968)
- Brandis Kemp (1944–2020)
- Ellie Kemper (born 1980)
- Luke Kempner (born 1987)
- Suzanna Kempner (born 1985)
- Harriet Kemsley (born 1987)
- Sarah Kendall (born 1976)
- Edgar Kennedy (1890–1948)
- Graham Kennedy (1934–2005)
- Jamie Kennedy (born 1970)
- Mimi Kennedy (born 1948)
- Tom Kennedy (1885–1965)
- Trey Kennedy
- Kerri Kenney-Silver (born 1970)
- Jon Kenny (born 1957)
- Tom Kenny (born 1962)
- Sean Kent
- Humphrey Ker (born 1982)
- Langston Kerman (born 1987)
- Hape Kerkeling (born 1964)
- Michael Kessler (born 1967)
- Keegan-Michael Key (born 1971)
- Kristin Key (born 1980)
- Tim Key (born 1976)
- Sarah Keyworth (born 1993)
- Amanullah Khan (born 1970)
- Guz Khan (born 1986)
- Shappi Khorsandi (born 1973)
- The Kid Mero (born 1983)
- Ford Kiernan (born 1962)
- Laura Kightlinger (born 1969)
- Pat Kilbane (born 1969)
- Craig Kilborn (born 1962)
- Karen Kilgariff (born 1970)
- Taran Killam (born 1982)
- Ronnie Killings (aka) R-Truth (born 1972)
- Laurie Kilmartin (born 1965)
- Jimmy Kimmel (born 1967)
- Jonathan Kimmel (born 1976)
- Kyle Kinane (born 1976)
- Richard Kind (born 1956)
- Andy Kindler (born 1956)
- Alan King (1927–2004)
- Anthony King
- Dave King (1929–2002)
- Georgia King (born 1986)
- Jaime King (born 1979)
- Matt King (born 1968)
- Michael Patrick King (born 1954)
- Nika King
- Sam Kinison (1953–1992)
- Greg Kinnear (born 1963)
- Roy Kinnear (1934–1988)
- Kathy Kinney (born 1954)
- Angela Kinsey (born 1971)
- Bruno Kirby (1949–2006)
- Bill Kirchenbauer (born 1953)
- Jen Kirkman (born 1974)
- Matt Kirshen (born 1980)
- Jessica Kirson (born 1969)
- Takeshi Kitano (born 1947)
- Jonathan Kite (born 1979)
- Daniel Kitson (born 1977)
- Roger Kitter (1949–2015)
- Felix Kjellberg (aka) PewDiePie (born 1989)
- Julie Klausner (born 1978)
- Chris Klein (born 1979)
- Ethan Klein (born 1985)
- Jessi Klein (born 1975)
- Robert Klein (born 1942)
- Jordan Klepper (born 1979)
- Kevin Kline (born 1947)
- Jack Klugman (1922–2012)
- Jessica Knappett (born 1984)
- Christopher Knight (born 1957)
- Jak Knight (1993–2022)
- Ted Knight (1923–1986)
- Wayne Knight (born 1955)
- Don Knotts (1924–2006)
- Christy Knowings (1980–2026)
- Johnny Knoxville (born 1971)
- Chris Knutson
- Christine Ko (born 1988)
- Cody Ko (born 1990)
- Olga Koch (born 1992)
- David Koechner (born 1962)
- Stephanie Koenig (born 1987)
- Matt Koff
- Gaby Köster (born 1961)
- Michael Koman (born 1977)
- Hari Kondabolu (born 1982)
- Dada Kondke (1932–1998)
- Anna Konkle (born 1987)
- Jenni Konner (born 1971)
- Bernie Kopell (born 1933)
- Lynne Koplitz (born 1969)
- Harvey Korman (1927–2008)
- Zach Kornfeld (born 1990)
- Annie Korzen (born 1938)
- Liza Koshy (born 1996)
- Michael Kosta (born 1979)
- Ernie Kovacs (1919–1962)
- Jo Koy (born 1971)
- Lindsey Kraft (born 1980)
- Jane Krakowski (born 1968)
- Eric Allan Kramer (born 1962)
- John Krasinski (born 1979)
- Jan Kraus (born 1953)
- Diether Krebs (1947–2000)
- Bert Kreischer (born 1972)
- Howard Kremer (born 1971)
- Jonathan Krisel (born 1979)
- Kurt Krömer (born 1974)
- Nick Kroll (born 1978)
- Maren Kroymann (born 1949)
- Mike Krüger (born 1951)
- Sonia Kruger (born 1965)
- David Krumholtz (born 1978)
- Esther Ku (born 1980)
- Lisa Kudrow (born 1963)
- Grace Kuhlenschmidt (born 1995)
- Akshay Kumar (born 1967)
- Nish Kumar (born 1985)
- Mila Kunis (born 1983)
- Elvira Kurt (born 1961)
- Swoosie Kurtz (born 1944)
- Ashton Kutcher (born 1978)
- Sarah Kuttner (born 1979)
- Eugenia Kuzmina (born 1981)

=== L ===
- Shia LaBeouf (born 1986)
- Tyler Labine (born 1978)
- Jake Lacy (born 1986)
- Preston Lacy (born 1969)
- Cathy Ladman
- Jon Lajoie (born 1980)
- Don Lake (born 1956)
- Patricia Lake (1919–1993)
- Maurice LaMarche (born 1958)
- Leah Lamarr (born 1988)
- Phil LaMarr (born 1967)
- Kate Lambert (born 1981)
- Lisa Lampanelli (born 1961)
- Amy Landecker (born 1969)
- David Lander (1947–2020)
- Steve Landesberg (1936–2010)
- Matteo Lane (born 1986)
- Nathan Lane (born 1956)
- Richard Lane (1899–1982)
- Kate Langbroek (born 1965)
- Harry Langdon (1894–1944)
- Artie Lange (born 1967)
- Ted Lange (born 1948)
- Chris Langham (born 1949)
- Ruth Langsford (born 1960)
- Beth Lapides
- Lauren Lapkus (born 1985)
- Rocky LaPorte
- John Lapus (born 1973)
- John Larroquette (born 1947)
- Larry the Cable Guy (born 1963)
- Jay Larson
- Queen Latifah (born 1970)
- Stan Laurel (1890–1965)
- Dan Lauria (born 1947)
- Hugh Laurie (born 1959)
- Ed Lauter (1938–2013)
- Lauren Laverne (born 1978)
- Linda Lavin (1937–2024)
- Tony Law (born 1969)
- Bill Lawrence (born 1968)
- Carolyn Lawrence (born 1967)
- Doug Lawrence (Mr Lawrence) (born 1969)
- Martin Lawrence (born 1965)
- Mike Lawrence (born 1983)
- Vicki Lawrence (born 1949)
- Anzu Lawson (born 1980)
- Josh Lawson (born 1981)
- Maggie Lawson (born 1980)
- Preacher Lawson (born 1991)
- Cloris Leachman (1926–2021)
- Keith Leak Jr. (born 1991)
- Denis Leary (born 1957)
- Matt LeBlanc (born 1967)
- Annie Lederman (born 1983)
- Andy Lee (born 1981)
- Bobby Lee (born 1972)
- C.S. Lee (born 1971)
- Daniel Curtis Lee (born 1991)
- Greg Lee (born 1962)
- Hana Mae Lee (born 1988)
- Jamie Lee (born 1983)
- Jason Lee (born 1970)
- Paul Sun-Hyung Lee (born 1972)
- Raquel Lee (born 1986)
- Rex Lee (born 1969)
- Stewart Lee (born 1968)
- Terence Lee (born 1964)
- Andrew Leeds (born 1981)
- Mekki Leeper (born 1994)
- Jane Leeves (born 1961)
- Michael Legge (born 1968)
- Natasha Leggero (born 1974)
- Jay Leggett (1963–2013)
- John Leguizamo (born 1960)
- John Lehr (born 1965)
- Tom Lehrer (1928–2025)
- Carol Leifer (born 1956)
- Ismo Leikola (born 1979)
- Steve Lemme (born 1968)
- Jack Lemmon (1925–2001)
- Nancy Lenehan (born 1953)
- Tom Lenk (born 1976)
- Thomas Lennon (born 1970)
- Jay Leno (born 1950)
- Jack E. Leonard (1910–1973)
- Téa Leoni (born 1966)
- Chauncey Leopardi (born 1981)
- Yassir Lester (born 1984)
- James Lesure (born 1970)
- Matt Letscher (born 1970)
- Kathy Lette (born 1958)
- David Letterman (born 1947)
- Sam Levenson (1911–1980)
- Johnny Lever (born 1950)
- Zachary Levi (born 1980)
- Kristine Levine (born 1970)
- Samm Levine (born 1982)
- Cash Levy
- Dan Levy (born 1981)
- Dan Levy (born 1983)
- Eugene Levy (born 1946)
- Clea Lewis (born 1965)
- Jenifer Lewis (born 1957)
- Jerry Lewis (1926–2017)
- Kimrie Lewis (born 1982)
- Phill Lewis (born 1968)
- Richard Lewis (1947–2024)
- Robert Q. Lewis (1921–1991)
- Shari Lewis (1933–1998)
- Vicki Lewis (born 1960)
- Leslie Liao (born 1987)
- Kobi Libii
- Ali Liebegott (born 1971)
- Paul Lieberstein (born 1967)
- Wendy Liebman (born 1961)
- Gabe Liedman (born 1982)
- Judith Light (born 1949)
- Lil Dicky (born 1988)
- Lil' JJ (born 1990)
- Matthew Lillard (born 1970)
- Hal Linden (born 1931)
- Riki Lindhome (born 1979)
- George Lindsey (1928–2012)
- Joe Lipari (born 1979)
- Maureen Lipman (born 1946)
- Joe List (born 1982)
- Zoe Lister-Jones (born 1982)
- Ian Lithgow (born 1972)
- John Lithgow (born 1945)
- Luciana Littizzetto (born 1964)
- Ralf Little (born 1980)
- Rich Little (born 1938)
- Rob Little (born 1972)
- Steve Little (born 1972)
- Beth Littleford (born 1968)
- Lucy Liu (born 1968)
- Ron Livingston (born 1967)
- Christopher Lloyd (born 1938)
- Eric Lloyd (born 1986)
- Harold Lloyd (1893–1971)
- Roger Lloyd-Pack (1944–2014)
- Joe Lo Truglio (born 1970)
- Daniel Lobell (born 1982/1983)
- Sean Lock (1963–2021)
- Freddy Lockhart (born 1979)
- Jamie Loftus (born 1993)
- Greg London (born 1966)
- Jay London (born 1966)
- Josie Long (born 1982)
- Justin Long (born 1978)
- Shelley Long (born 1949)
- Michael Longfellow (born 1994)
- Mike Lookinland (born 1960)
- Andrés López (born 1971)
- George Lopez (born 1961)
- Mario Lopez (born 1973)
- Dave Losso
- Julia Louis-Dreyfus (born 1961)
- Faizon Love (born 1968)
- Jason Love
- Judi Love (born 1980)
- Loni Love (born 1971)
- Vella Lovell (born 1985)
- Jon Lovett (born 1982)
- Jon Lovitz (born 1957)
- Rob Lowe (born 1964)
- Chris Lowell (born 1984)
- Britt Lower (born 1985)
- Adam Lowitt
- Mark Lowry (born 1958)
- Matt Lucas (born 1974)
- Ingolf Lück (born 1958)
- Luenell (born 1959)
- Joanna Lumley (born 1946)
- Eric Lutes (born 1962)
- John Lutz (born 1973)
- Joe Lycett (born 1988)
- Desi Lydic (born 1981)
- Carmen Lynch (born 1972)
- Drew Lynch (born 1991)
- Jane Lynch (born 1960)
- Katherine Lynch (born 1972)
- Stephen Lynch (born 1971)
- Paul Lynde (1926–1982)
- Nicholas Lyndhurst (born 1961)
- Chelcie Lynn (born 1987)
- Melanie Lynskey (born 1977)
- Natasha Lyonne (born 1979)

=== M ===
- Moms Mabley (1894–1975)
- Sunny Mabrey (born 1975)
- Bernie Mac (1957–2008)
- Hayes MacArthur (born 1977)
- Scott MacArthur (born 1979)
- Norm Macdonald (1959–2021)
- Rachael MacFarlane (born 1976)
- Seth MacFarlane (born 1973)
- Gavin MacLeod (1931–2021)
- Fred MacMurray (1908–1991)
- Justina Machado (born 1972)
- April Macie (born 1975)
- Laird Macintosh (born 1962)
- Nathan Macintosh (born 1985)
- Charles Mack (1888–1934)
- Lee Mack (born 1968)
- Mary Mack (born 1975)
- Doon Mackichan (born 1962)
- Mike MacRae (born 1977)
- Sheila MacRae (1921–2014)
- Chris Maddock (born 1977/1978)
- Kathleen Madigan (born 1965)
- Al Madrigal (born 1971)
- Jolina Magdangal (born 1978)
- Ania Magliano (born 1998)
- Scooter Magruder (born 1988)
- Gráinne Maguire
- Sean Maguire (born 1976)
- Naveed Mahbub
- Bill Maher (born 1956)
- Bruce Mahler (born 1950)
- John Mahoney (1940–2018)
- Bobby Mair (born 1986)
- Shaun Majumder (born 1972)
- Ally Maki (born 1986)
- Wendie Malick (born 1950)
- Joshua Malina (born 1966)
- Keith Malley (born 1974)
- Jose Manalo (born 1966)
- Rudy Mancuso (born 1992)
- Joe Mande (born 1983)
- David Mandel (born 1970)
- Howie Mandel (born 1955)
- Dylan Mandlsohn (born 1980/1981)
- Aasif Mandvi (born 1966)
- Jason Manford (born 1981)
- Stephen Mangan (born 1968)
- Jonathan Mangum (born 1971)
- Sunita Mani (born 1986)
- Sebastian Maniscalco (born 1973)
- Leslie Mann (born 1972)
- Charlie Manna (1920–1970)
- Bernard Manning (1930–2007)
- Taryn Manning (born 1978)
- J.P. Manoux (born 1969)
- Jason Mantzoukas (born 1972)
- Edu Manzano (born 1955)
- Luis Manzano (born 1981)
- Alec Mapa (born 1965)
- Jenna Marbles (born 1986)
- Joseph Marcell (born 1948)
- Bam Margera (born 1979)
- Cheech Marin (born 1946)
- Ken Marino (born 1968)
- Pigmeat Markham (1904–1981)
- Alfred Marks (1921–1996)
- Bob Marley (born 1967)
- Annabel Marlow
- Marc Maron (born 1963)
- Ross Marquand (born 1981)
- Empoy Marquez (born 1981)
- Lassy Marquez (born 1976)
- Zoë Coombs Marr
- Elizabeth Marrero (born 1963)
- Dylan Marron (born 1988)
- Betty Marsden (1919–1998)
- James Marsden (born 1973)
- Ben Marshall (born 1995)
- Garry Marshall (1934–2016)
- Paula Marshall (born 1964)
- Penny Marshall (1943–2018)
- Andrea Martin (born 1947)
- Dean Martin (1917–1995)
- Demetri Martin (born 1973)
- Dick Martin (1922–2008)
- Duane Martin (born 1965)
- Jack Martin (born 1998)
- Mae Martin (born 1987)
- Millicent Martin (born 1934)
- Steve Martin (born 1945)
- Adrian Martinez (born 1972)
- Jackie Martling (born 1947)
- Karen Maruyama (born 1958)
- Chico Marx (1887–1961)
- Groucho Marx (1890–1977)
- Gummo Marx (1892–1977)
- Harpo Marx (1888–1964)
- Patricia Marx
- Zeppo Marx (1901–1979)
- Julia Masli (born 1995)
- Jackie Mason (1928–2021)
- Christopher Massey (born 1990)
- Kyle Massey (born 1991)
- Christopher Masterson (born 1980)
- Danny Masterson (born 1976)
- Sean Masterson
- Rose Matafeo (born 1992)
- Ross Mathews (born 1979)
- Matt Mathews (born 1993)
- Shane Mauss (born 1980)
- Andrew Maxwell (born 1974)
- Elaine May (born 1932)
- Ralphie May (1972–2017)
- Rik Mayall (1958–2014)
- Wendy Maybury (born 1974/1975)
- Youngmi Mayer (born 1984)
- Ayden Mayeri (born 1990)
- Bill Maynard (1928–2018)
- X Mayo (born 1987)
- Jayma Mays (born 1979)
- Dan Mazer (born 1971)
- Jennie McAlpine (born 1984)
- Alphonso McAuley (born 1984)
- Jack McBrayer (born 1973)
- Danny McBride (born 1976)
- Jenny McCarthy (born 1972)
- Matt McCarthy (born 1979)
- Melissa McCarthy (born 1970)
- Dave McCary (born 1985)
- Rue McClanahan (1934–2010)
- Fancy Ray McCloney
- Edie McClurg (born 1945)
- Matthew McConaughey (born 1969)
- Brian McConnachie (1942–2024)
- Eric McCormack (born 1963)
- Dan McCoy (born 1978)
- Michael McCullers (born 1971)
- Bruce McCulloch (born 1961)
- Julian McCullough (born 1979)
- Paul McCullough (1883–1936)
- Suli McCullough (born 1968)
- Paul McDermott (born 1962)
- Josh McDermitt (born 1978)
- Heather McDonald (born 1970)
- Kevin McDonald (born 1961)
- Michael McDonald (born 1964)
- Charlotte McDonnell (born 1990)
- Charlie McDowell (born 1983)
- Rob McElhenney (born 1977)
- Griffin McElroy (born 1987)
- Justin McElroy (born 1980)
- Travis McElroy (born 1983)
- Reba McEntire (born 1955)
- Bonnie McFarlane (born 1973)
- Caitlin McGee (born 1988)
- John C. McGinley (born 1959)
- Ted McGinley (born 1958)
- Mike McGlone (born 1972)
- Joel McHale (born 1971)
- Jan McInnis
- Michael McIntyre (born 1976)
- Rose McIver (born 1988)
- Adam McKay (born 1968)
- Antoine McKay (born 1970)
- Michael McKean (born 1947)
- Jessica McKenna (born 1987)
- Patrick McKenna (born 1960)
- Bret McKenzie (born 1976)
- Brian McKim
- Mark McKinney (born 1959)
- Kate McKinnon (born 1984)
- Rhett McLaughlin (born 1977)
- Des McLean
- Wendi McLendon-Covey (born 1969)
- Seán McLoughlin (aka) jacksepticeye (born 1990)
- Pauline McLynn (born 1962)
- Heather McMahan (born 1987)
- Ed McMahon (1923–2009)
- Rove McManus (born 1974)
- Don McMillan
- Joanne McNally (born 1983)
- Ant McPartlin (born 1975)
- Ryan McPartlin (born 1975)
- Jeff Meacham (born 1979)
- Vaughn Meader (1936–2004)
- Audrey Meadows (1922–1996)
- Tim Meadows (born 1961)
- Kevin Meaney (1956–2016)
- Angela Means (born 1963)
- Tatanka Means (born 1985)
- Anne Meara (1929–2015)
- Tallie Medel
- Matt Meese (born 1983)
- Keyla Monterroso Mejia (born 1998)
- Fred Melamed (born 1956)
- Stuttering John Melendez (born 1965)
- Jill-Michele Melean (born 1979)
- Doug Mellard
- Carlos Mencia (born 1967)
- Maine Mendoza (born 1995)
- Rick Mercer (born 1969)
- Stephen Merchant (born 1974)
- Freddie Meredith (born 1993)
- Dave Merheje
- Liz Meriwether (born 1981)
- Buster Merryfield (1920–1999)
- Paul Merton (born 1957)
- Chris Messina (born 1974)
- Debra Messing (born 1968)
- Laurie Metcalf (born 1955)
- Art Metrano (1936–2021)
- Rebecca Metz (born 1973)
- Kurt Metzger (born 1977)
- Jason Mewes (born 1974)
- Breckin Meyer (born 1974)
- Josh Meyers (born 1976)
- Seth Meyers (born 1973)
- Florinda Meza (born 1948)
- Shaun Micallef (born 1962)
- Michael V. (born 1969)
- Vic Michaelis (born 1993)
- Felicia Michaels (born 1964)
- Lorne Michaels (born 1944)
- Kate Micucci (born 1980)
- Thomas Middleditch (born 1982)
- Bette Midler (born 1945)
- A.D. Miles (born 1971)
- John Milhiser (born 1981)
- Cristin Milioti (born 1985)
- Ben Miller (born 1966)
- Christa Miller (born 1964)
- Courtney Miller (born 1995)
- Dennis Miller (born 1953)
- George Miller (aka) Joji/Filthy Frank (born 1993)
- Karlous Miller (born 1983)
- Larry Miller (born 1953)
- Marilyn Suzanne Miller (born 1950)
- Max Miller (1894–1963)
- Murray Miller (born 1976)
- Noel Miller (born 1989)
- T.J. Miller (born 1981)
- Sarah Millican (born 1975)
- Spike Milligan (1918–2002)
- Florence Mills (1896–1927)
- Andy Milonakis (born 1976)
- Tim Minchin (born 1975)
- Brian Miner (born 1981)
- Hasan Minhaj (born 1985)
- Jerry Minor (born 1969)
- Dan Mintz (born 1981)
- Christopher Mintz-Plasse (born 1989)
- Matt Mira (born 1983)
- Lin-Manuel Miranda (born 1980)
- Eugene Mirman (born 1975)
- Daryl Mitchell (born 1965)
- David Mitchell (born 1974)
- Duke Mitchell (1926–1981)
- Finesse Mitchell (born 1972)
- Kel Mitchell (born 1978)
- Mike Mitchell (born 1982)
- Aditi Mittal
- Michael Mittermeier (born 1966)
- Jerod Mixon (born 1981)
- Katy Mixon (born 1981)
- Kenice Mobley (born 1985)
- Colin Mochrie (born 1957)
- Mehran Modiri (born 1967)
- Alex Moffat (born 1982)
- Kausar Mohammed (born 1992)
- Nick Mohammed (born 1980)
- Jay Mohr (born 1970)
- Al Molinaro (1919–2015)
- Richard Moll (1943–2023)
- John Moloney
- Dominic Monaghan (born 1976)
- Mo'Nique (born 1967)
- Bob Monkhouse (1928–2003)
- Elizabeth Montgomery (1933–1995)
- Lucy Montgomery (born 1975)
- Adam Montoya (aka) SeaNanners (born 1984)
- Lou Moon
- Kyle Mooney (born 1984)
- Nate Mooney
- Paul Mooney (1941–2021)
- Christina Moore (born 1973)
- Dudley Moore (1935–2002)
- Mary Tyler Moore (1936–2017)
- Michael Moore (born 1954)
- Phil Moore (born 1961)
- Rudy Ray Moore (1927–2008)
- Tim Moore (1887–1958)
- Trevor Moore (1980–2021)
- Victor Moore (1876–1962)
- Agnes Moorehead (1900–1974)
- Maribeth Monroe (born 1978)
- Steve Monroe (born 1972)
- Natalie Morales (born 1985)
- Caitlin Moran (born 1975)
- Dylan Moran (born 1971)
- George Moran (1881–1949)
- Polly Moran (1883–1952)
- Rick Moranis (born 1953)
- Dave Mordal (born c. 1950–1960s)
- Eric Morecambe (1926–1984)
- German Moreno (1933–2016)
- Harley Morenstein (born 1985)
- Dermot Morgan (1952–1998)
- Diane Morgan (born 1975)
- Elliott Morgan (born 1987)
- John Morgan (1930–2004)
- Leanne Morgan (born 1965)
- Matt Morgan (born 1977)
- Tracy Morgan (born 1968)
- Richie Moriarty (born 1980)
- Brent Morin (born 1986)
- Pat Morita (1932–2005)
- Sam Morril (born 1986)
- Brad Morris (born 1975)
- Chris Morris (born 1965)
- Garrett Morris (born 1937)
- Julia Morris (born 1968)
- Lamorne Morris (born 1983)
- Seth Morris (born 1970)
- Neil Morrissey (born 1962)
- Eleanor Morton
- Howard Morton (1925–1997)
- Lew Morton
- Laci Mosley (born 1991)
- Don Most (born 1953)
- Zero Mostel (1915–1977)
- José Sánchez Mota (born 1965)
- Tahj Mowry (born 1986)
- Matthew Moy (born 1984)
- Bobby Moynihan (born 1977)
- Teacher Mpamire (born 1983)
- Ina Müller (born 1965)
- Aga Muhlach (born 1969)
- John Mulaney (born 1982)
- Gary Mule Deer (born 1939)
- Martin Mull (1943–2024)
- Megan Mullally (born 1958)
- Mitch Mullany (1968–2008)
- Neil Mullarkey (born 1961)
- Nick Mullen (born 1988)
- Brennan Lee Mulligan (born 1988)
- Annie Mumolo (born 1973)
- Noah Munck (born 1996)
- Frankie Muniz (born 1985)
- Olivia Munn (born 1980)
- Simon Munnery (born 1967)
- Richard Murdoch (1907–1990)
- Annie Murphy (born 1986)
- Charlie Murphy (1959–2017)
- Colin Murphy (born 1968)
- Eddie Murphy (born 1961)
- Kevin Murphy (born 1956)
- Larry Murphy (born 1972)
- Morgan Murphy (born 1981)
- Noel Murphy (born 1961)
- Al Murray (born 1968)
- Bill Murray (born 1950)
- James Murray (born 1976)
- Jan Murray (1916–2006)
- Joel Murray (born 1963)
- Lorenzo Music (1937–2001)
- Erik Myers
- Mike Myers (born 1963)
- Arden Myrin (born 1973)

=== N ===
- Jim Nabors (1930–2017)
- David Nagle (aka) Nogla (born 1992)
- Suzy Nakamura (born 1968)
- Kevin Nalty (born 1969)
- Leonardo Nam (born 1979)
- Philomaine Nanema (born 1982)
- Aparna Nancherla (born 1982)
- Kumail Nanjiani (born 1978)
- Paul Nardizzi
- Jason Narvy (born 1974)
- Al Nash
- Amber Nash (born 1977)
- Jason Nash (born 1973)
- Niecy Nash (born 1970)
- Nikko Natividad (born 1993)
- Rex Navarette (born 1969)
- Vhong Navarro (born 1977)
- Henry Naylor (born 1966)
- Kunal Nayyar (born 1981)
- Cliff Nazarro (1904–1961)
- Link Neal (born 1978)
- Kevin Nealon (born 1953)
- Lucas Neff (born 1985)
- Negi (born 1979)
- Taylor Negron (1957–2015)
- Jamar Neighbors (born 1986)
- Bob Nelson (born 1958)
- Bridget Jones Nelson (born 1964)
- Craig T. Nelson (born 1944)
- Michael J. Nelson (born 1964)
- Ozzie Nelson (1906–1975)
- Thomas Nelstrop (born 1980)
- Nick Nemeroff (1989–2022)
- Nephew Tommy (born 1967)
- Felipe Neto (born 1988)
- Bebe Neuwirth (born 1958)
- Kyle Newacheck (born 1984)
- Bob Newhart (1929–2024)
- Anthony Newley (1931–1999)
- Griffin Newman (born 1989)
- Laraine Newman (born 1952)
- Robert Newman (born 1964)
- Tawny Newsome (born 1983)
- Bert Newton (1938–2021)
- Lee Newton (born 1985)
- Desus Nice (born 1981)
- Phil Nichol
- Brittani Nichols (born 1988)
- Mike Nichols (1931–2014)
- Rhys Nicholson (born 1990)
- Dustin Nickerson (born 1984)
- Leslie Nielsen (1926–2010)
- Trevor Noah (born 1984)
- Ross Noble (born 1976)
- Coleen Nolan (born 1965)
- Katie Nolan (born 1987)
- Henry Normal (born 1956)
- Hayley Marie Norman (born 1989)
- Zack Norman (1940–2024)
- Mark Normand (born 1983)
- Nolan North (born 1970)
- Graham Norton (born 1963)
- Jim Norton (born 1968)
- Duncan Norvelle (born 1958)
- Tig Notaro (born 1971)
- B. J. Novak (born 1979)
- Jacqueline Novak (born 1982)
- Kayvan Novak (born 1978)
- Don Novello (born 1943)
- Dieter Nuhr (born 1960)
- Luke Null (born 1990)
- Whindersson Nunes (born 1995)
- Oscar Nunez (born 1958)
- Ego Nwodim (born 1988)
- Nyambi Nyambi (born 1979)
- Bill Nye (born 1955)
- Louis Nye (1913–2005)

=== O ===
- Jay Oakerson (born 1977)
- Matt Oberg (born 1976)
- Dara Ó Briain (born 1972)
- Conan O'Brien (born 1963)
- Katie O'Brien (born 1983)
- Mike O'Brien (born 1976)
- Jerry O'Connell (born 1974)
- Ryan O'Connell (born 1986)
- Carroll O'Connor (1924–2001)
- Des O'Connor (1932–2020)
- Donald O'Connor (1925–2003)
- Sean O'Connor (born 1985)
- Bill Oddie (born 1941)
- Bob Odenkirk (born 1962)
- Claudia O'Doherty (born 1983)
- David O'Doherty (born 1975)
- Mark O'Donnell (1954–2012)
- Rosie O'Donnell (born 1962)
- Steve O'Donnell (born 1954)
- Michael O'Donoghue (1940–1994)
- Chris O'Dowd (born 1979)
- Nick Offerman (born 1970)
- Paul O'Grady (1955–2023)
- Ardal O'Hanlon (born 1965)
- Catherine O'Hara (1954–2026)
- Jim O'Heir (born 1962)
- John O'Hurley (born 1954)
- Atsuko Okatsuka (born 1988)
- Tricia O'Kelley (born 1968)
- Earl Okin (born 1947)
- Amy Okuda (born 1989)
- John Oliver (born 1977)
- Alberto Olmedo (1933–1988)
- Ashley Olsen (born 1986)
- Mary-Kate Olsen (born 1986)
- Ole Olsen (1892–1963)
- Kaitlin Olson (born 1975)
- Conner O'Malley (born 1986)
- Mike O'Malley (born 1966)
- Timothy Omundson (born 1969)
- Patrice O'Neal (1969–2011)
- Ed O'Neill (born 1946)
- Steve Oram (born 1973)
- Yvonne Orji (born 1983)
- Taylor Ortega (born 1989)
- Zak Orth (born 1970)
- Andrew Orvedahl (born 1976)
- Barunka O'Shaughnessy
- Andi Osho (born 1973)
- Aida Osman (born 1996)
- David Ossman (born 1936)
- Dan Oster (born 1981)
- Patton Oswalt (born 1969)
- Cheri Oteri (born 1962)
- Rick Overton (born 1954)
- Bill Owen (1914–1999)
- Gary Owen (born 1974)
- Larry Owens
- Zac Oyama (born 1987)
- Gil Ozeri

=== P ===
- Jack Paar (1918–2004)
- Frankie Pace
- Celia Pacquola (born 1983)
- Anthony Padilla (born 1987)
- Ashley Padilla (born 1993)
- Robin Padilla (born 1969)
- Monica Padman (born 1987)
- Elliot Page (born 1987)
- Ken Page (1954–2024)
- LaWanda Page (1920–2002)
- Natalie Palamides (born 1990)
- Brian Palermo
- Ron Palillo (1949–2012)
- Michael Palin (born 1943)
- Adam Pally (born 1982)
- Candy Palmater (1968–2021)
- Keke Palmer (born 1993)
- Sam Pancake (born 1964)
- Maulik Pancholy (born 1974)
- Sam Pang (born 1973)
- Angelica Panganiban (born 1986)
- Franklin Pangborn (1889–1958)
- John Pankow (born 1954)
- Tom Papa (born 1968)
- Yannis Pappas (born 1975)
- John Paragon (1954–2021)
- Zhubin Parang (born 1981)
- Jimmy Pardo (born 1966)
- Ron Pardo (born 1967)
- Lennon Parham (born 1976)
- Devika Parikh (born 1966)
- Sandeep Parikh (born 1980)
- Randall Park (born 1974)
- Sydney Park (born 1997)
- Nicole Parker (born 1978)
- Pardis Parker
- Paula Jai Parker (born 1969)
- Sarah Jessica Parker (born 1965)
- Trey Parker (born 1969)
- Katherine Parkinson (born 1977/1978)
- Chris Parnell (born 1967)
- Grace Parra (born 1984)
- Rachel Parris (born 1984)
- Andy Parsons (born 1967)
- Jim Parsons (born 1973)
- Karyn Parsons (born 1966)
- Jean-Claude Pascal (1927–1992)
- Sara Pascoe (born 1981)
- Joe Pasquale (born 1961)
- David Pasquesi (born 1960)
- Bastian Pastewka (born 1972)
- Kasha Patel (born 1991)
- Nimesh Patel (born 1986)
- Punam Patel (born 1993)
- Ravi Patel (born 1978)
- Mandy Patinkin (born 1952)
- Edi Patterson (born 1972)
- Kam Patterson (born 1999)
- Jake Paul (born 1997)
- Pat Paulsen (1927–1997)
- Rob Paulsen (born 1956)
- David Paymer (born 1954)
- Allen Payne (born 1968)
- Carl Anthony Payne II (born 1969)
- Khary Payton (born 1972)
- Christina Pazsitzky (born 1976)
- Ray Peacock (born 1973)
- Trevor Peacock (1931–2021)
- Jack Pearl (1894–1982)
- Minnie Pearl (1912–1996)
- Zack Pearlman (born 1988)
- Josh Peck (born 1986)
- Artemis Pebdani (born 1977)
- Ron Pederson (born 1978)
- Nasim Pedrad (born 1981)
- Jordan Peele (born 1979)
- Amanda Peet (born 1972)
- Simon Pegg (born 1970)
- Paula Pell (born 1963)
- Jessimae Peluso (born 1982)
- Johnny Pemberton (born 1981)
- Steve Pemberton (born 1967)
- Kal Penn (born 1977)
- Joe Penner (1904–1941)
- Eddie Pepitone (born 1958)
- Jack Pepper (1902–1979)
- Joe Pera (born 1988/1989)
- Kevin Pereira (born 1982)
- Chelsea Peretti (born 1978)
- Ash Perez (born 1989)
- Danielle Perez
- Ion Perez (born 1990)
- Chris Perfetti (born 1988)
- Dewayne Perkins (born 1990)
- Kathleen Rose Perkins (born 1974)
- Sue Perkins (born 1969)
- Rhea Perlman (born 1948)
- Matthew Perry (1969–2023)
- Tyler Perry (born 1969)
- Jon Pertwee (1919–1996)
- Tammy Pescatelli (born 1969)
- Melissa Peterman (born 1971)
- Bernadette Peters (born 1948)
- Matt Peters (born 1979)
- Russell Peters (born 1970)
- Paul Petersen (born 1945)
- Cassandra Peterson (born 1951)
- Alexandra Petri (born 1988)
- Dat Phan (born 1975)
- Jay Pharoah (born 1987)
- J.J. Philbin (born 1974)
- Regis Philbin (1931–2020)
- Busy Philipps (born 1979)
- Emo Philips (born 1956)
- Henry Phillips (born 1969)
- Sally Phillips (born 1970)
- Philomaine Nanema, aka Philo (born 1982)
- Dannah Phirman (born 1975)
- Andrew Phung (born 1984)
- Bobby Pickett (1938–2007)
- Chonda Pierce (born 1960)
- David Hyde Pierce (born 1959)
- Amy Pietz (born 1969)
- Hannah Pilkes (born 1992)
- Karl Pilkington (born 1972)
- Daniella Pineda (born 1987)
- John Pinette (1964–2014)
- Ryan Pinkston (born 1988)
- Danielle Pinnock (born 1988)
- Joe Piscopo (born 1951)
- ZaSu Pitts (1894–1963)
- Jeremy Piven (born 1965)
- Nigel Planer (born 1953)
- Ben Platt (born 1993)
- Aubrey Plaza (born 1984)
- Suzanne Pleshette (1937–2008)
- Amy Poehler (born 1971)
- Greg Poehler (born 1974)
- Jon Pointing (born 1986)
- Pokwang (born 1972)
- Kevin Pollak (born 1957)
- Mike Pollock (born 1965)
- Lele Pons (born 1996)
- Jorge Porcel (1936–2006)
- Javier Portales (1937–2003)
- Chris Porter (born 1979)
- Don Porter (1912–1997)
- Lucy Porter (born 1973)
- Tommy Pope (born 1979)
- Brian Posehn (born 1966)
- Parker Posey (born 1968)
- Tom Poston (1921–2007)
- Lauren Potter (born 1990)
- Annie Potts (born 1952)
- Paula Poundstone (born 1959)
- Dan Povenmire (born 1963)
- Esther Povitsky (born 1988)
- Chris Powell (born 1983)
- Dana Powell (born 1974)
- Dante Powell (born 1987/1988)
- Glen Powell (born 1988)
- DeStorm Power (born 1982)
- Navin Prabhakar
- John Prats (born 1984)
- Chris Pratt (born 1979)
- Guy Pratt (born 1962)
- Kyla Pratt (born 1986)
- Laura Prepon (born 1980)
- Jaime Pressly (born 1977)
- Amber Preston
- Eric Price (born 1974)
- Tom Price (born 1980)
- Freddie Prinze (1954–1977)
- Freddie Prinze Jr. (born 1976)
- Kiri Pritchard Mclean (born 1986)
- Lauren Pritchard (born 1977)
- Michael Pritchard (born 1950)
- Philip Proctor (born 1940)
- Markus Maria Profitlich (born 1960)
- Greg Proops (born 1959)
- Mark Proksch (born 1978)
- Paul Provenza (born 1957)
- Kelly Pryce (born 1986/1987)
- DJ Pryor (born 1988)
- Richard Pryor (1940–2005)
- Cristina Pucelli (born 1969)
- Danny Pudi (born 1979)
- Rolo Puente (1939–2011)
- Lucy Punch (born 1977)
- Steve Punt (born 1962)
- Missi Pyle (born 1972)

=== Q ===
- DJ Qualls (born 1978)
- Caroline Quentin (born 1960)
- Adam Quesnell (born 1981/1982)
- Steven Michael Quezada (born 1963)
- Kate Quigley (born 1982)
- Brian Quinn (born 1976)
- Colin Quinn (born 1959)
- Frankie Quiñones (born 1983)
- Rufa Mae Quinto (born 1978)
- Pauline Quirke (born 1959)

=== R ===
- Stefan Raab (born 1966)
- Allyn Rachel (born 1983)
- Alan Rachins (1942–2024)
- Chloe Radcliffe (born 1990)
- Gilda Radner (1946–1989)
- Josh Radnor (born 1974)
- Kat Radley (born 1985)
- Charlotte Rae (1926–2018)
- Issa Rae (born 1985)
- Rags Ragland (1905–1946)
- Jeff Ragsdale (1971–2023)
- Eric Rahill (born 1993)
- Kareem Rahma (born 1986)
- Victor Raider-Wexler (born 1943)
- Randy Rainbow (born 1981)
- Mary Lynn Rajskub (born 1971)
- Sheryl Lee Ralph (born 1956)
- Louis Ramey
- Harold Ramis (1944–2014)
- Rachel Ramras (born 1974)
- Chris Ramsey (born 1986)
- Franchesca Ramsey (born 1983)
- Rosie Ramsey (born 1986)
- Tony Randall (1920–2004)
- Joe Randazzo (born 1978)
- Frank Randle (1901–1957)
- Romesh Ranganathan (born 1978)
- Richard Rankin (born 1983)
- Stephen Rannazzisi (born 1977)
- Andrew Rannells (born 1978)
- Amita Rao (born 1998)
- Michael Rapaport (born 1970)
- June Diane Raphael (born 1980)
- Jim Rash (born 1971)
- Allison Raskin (born 1989)
- Steen Raskopoulos (born 1987)
- Meaghan Rath (born 1986)
- Connor Ratliff
- John Ratzenberger (born 1947)
- Melissa Rauch (born 1980)
- Raven-Symoné (born 1985)
- Donnell Rawlings (born 1968)
- Adam Ray (born 1982)
- Jonah Ray (born 1981)
- Ted Ray (1905–1977)
- Martha Raye (1916–1994)
- Al Read (1909–1987)
- Howard Read (born 1984)
- Diona Reasonover (born 1992)
- Spoken Reasons (born 1988)
- Andreas Rebers (born 1958)
- Chris Redd (born 1985)
- Jasper Redd (born 1979)
- JR Reed (born 1967)
- Jon Reep (born 1972)
- Vic Reeves (born 1959)
- Brian Regan (born 1958)
- Jason Reich
- Leo Reich (born 1998)
- Sam Reich (born 1984)
- Anne Reid (born 1935)
- Daphne Maxwell Reid (born 1948)
- Noah Reid (born 1987)
- Tara Reid (born 1975)
- Tim Reid (born 1944)
- Caitlin Reilly (born 1989)
- Charles Nelson Reilly (1931–2007)
- John C. Reilly (born 1965)
- Carl Reiner (1922–2020)
- Rob Reiner (1947–2025)
- Paul Reiser (born 1956)
- Grace Reiter (born 2001)
- Ivan Reitman (1946–2022)
- Leah Remini (born 1970)
- Roy Rene (1892–1954)
- Adam Resnick
- Retta (born 1970)
- Paul Reubens (1952–2023)
- Willie Revillame (born 1961)
- Tony Revolori (born 1996)
- Simon Rex (born 1974)
- Gladys Reyes (born 1977)
- Alex Reymundo
- Manilyn Reynes (born 1972)
- Burt Reynolds (1936–2018)
- John Reynolds (born 1991)
- Rick Reynolds (born 1951)
- Ryan Reynolds (born 1976)
- Caroline Rhea (born 1964)
- Erica Rhodes (born 1983)
- Tom Rhodes (born 1967)
- Alfonso Ribeiro (born 1971)
- Giovanni Ribisi (born 1974)
- Alison Rich
- Katie Rich
- Simon Rich (born 1984)
- Denise Richards (born 1971)
- Jeff Richards (born 1974)
- Michael Richards (born 1949)
- April Richardson (born 1979)
- Jon Richardson (born 1982)
- Matt Richardson (born 1991)
- Miranda Richardson (born 1958)
- Red Richardson (born 1989)
- Sam Richardson (born 1984)
- Shane Richie (born 1964)
- Mathias Richling (born 1953)
- Jeff Richmond (born 1961)
- Andy Richter (born 1966)
- Laurence Rickard (born 1975)
- Don Rickles (1926–2017)
- Matt Rife (born 1995)
- Daniel Rigby (born 1982)
- Rob Riggle (born 1970)
- Gina Riley (born 1961)
- Jack Riley (1935–2016)
- Lisa Riley (born 1976)
- Kelly Ripa (born 1970)
- Jason Ritter (born 1980)
- John Ritter (1948–2003)
- Tyler Ritter (born 1985)
- Al Ritz (1901–1965)
- Harry Ritz (1907–1986)
- Jimmy Ritz (1904–1985)
- Emilio Rivera (born 1961)
- Joan Rivers (1933–2014)
- Rowland Rivron (born 1958)
- Steve Rizzo
- Ted Robbins (born 1955)
- Lyda Roberti (1906–1938)
- Al Roberts (born 1988)
- Doris Roberts (1925–2016)
- Ian Roberts (born 1965)
- John Roberts (born 1971)
- Ellen Robertson (born 1993)
- Jeanne Robertson (1943–2021)
- Noah Robertson (born 1983)
- John Robins (born 1982)
- Craig Robinson (born 1971)
- Joe Robinson (born 1968)
- Leonard Robinson
- Phoebe Robinson (born 1984)
- Tim Robinson (born 1981)
- Linda Robson (born 1958)
- Rosa Robson (born 1992)
- Mo Rocca (born 1969)
- Chris Rock (born 1965)
- Tony Rock (born 1974)
- Charles Rocket (1949–2005)
- Glenn Rockowitz (born 1970)
- Aida Rodriguez (born 1977)
- Gina Rodriguez (born 1984)
- Guillermo Rodriguez (born 1971)
- Paul Rodriguez (born 1955)
- Valente Rodriguez (born 1964)
- Daniel Roebuck (born 1963)
- Joe Rogan (born 1967)
- Lauren Miller Rogen (born 1982)
- Seth Rogen (born 1982)
- Matt Rogers (born 1990)
- Will Rogers (1879–1935)
- Justin Roiland (born 1980)
- Isabella Roland (born 1994)
- Henry Rollins (born 1961)
- Freddie Roman (1937–2022)
- Rick Roman (1966–1992)
- Larry Romano (born 1963)
- Ray Romano (born 1957)
- Michael Roof (1976–2009)
- Mickey Rooney (1920–2014)
- Rebecca Root (born 1969)
- Stephen Root (born 1951)
- George Roper (1934–2003)
- Tony Rosato (1954–2017)
- Patty Rosborough
- Rose Marie (1923–2017)
- Adam Rose (born 1987)
- Harriet Rose (born 1989)
- Andrea Rosen (born 1974)
- Michael Rosenbaum (born 1972)
- Tom Rosenthal (born 1988)
- Jeffrey Ross (born 1965)
- Jonathan Ross (born 1960)
- Lonny Ross (born 1978)
- Tracee Ellis Ross (born 1972)
- Steve Rossi (1932–2014)
- Eli Roth (born 1972)
- Barry Rothbart (born 1983)
- Natasha Rothwell (born 1980)
- Mitch Rouse (born 1964)
- Patricia Routledge (1929–2025)
- Dan Rowan (1922–1987)
- Delaney Rowe (born 1994)
- Patsy Rowlands (1931–2005)
- Ben Roy (born 1979)
- Josh Ruben (born 1983)
- Alex Rubens
- Michael Rubens
- Alan Ruck (born 1956)
- Paul Rudd (born 1969)
- Rita Rudner (born 1953)
- Jon Rudnitsky (born 1989)
- Maya Rudolph (born 1972)
- Amber Ruffin (born 1979)
- Kevin Ruf (born 1961)
- Sara Rue (born 1979)
- Charlie Ruggles (1886–1970)
- Debra Jo Rupp (born 1951)
- Chris Rush (1946–2018)
- Deborah Rush (born 1954)
- Willie Rushton (1937–1996)
- Anna Russell (1911–2006)
- Mark Russell (1932–2023)
- Nipsey Russell (1918–2005)
- Rosalind Russell (1907–1976)
- Paul Rust (born 1981)
- Nick Rutherford (born 1985)
- Irene Ryan (1902–1973)
- Katherine Ryan (born 1983)
- Roz Ryan (born 1951)
- Stevie Ryan (1984–2017)
- Tommy Ryman (born 1983)

=== S ===
- Andrew Sachs (1930–2016)
- Thomas Sadoski (born 1976)
- Jerry Sadowitz (born 1961)
- Bryan Safi
- Katey Sagal (born 1954)
- Bob Saget (1956–2022)
- Tami Sagher
- Mort Sahl (1927–2021)
- Nichole Sakura (born 1989)
- Rosa Salazar (born 1985)
- Charles "Chic" Sale (1885–1936)
- Soupy Sales (1926–2009)
- Peter Sallis (1921–2017)
- Bill Saluga (1937–2023)
- Tony Sam
- Andy Samberg (born 1978)
- Sugar Sammy (born 1976)
- Angus Sampson (born 1978/1979)
- Paul Sand (born 1932)
- Beverly Sanders (born 1940)
- Adam Sandler (born 1966)
- Isabel Sanford (1917–2004)
- Randy Santiago (born 1960)
- Andrew Santino (born 1983)
- Carlos Santos (born 1986)
- Judy Ann Santos (born 1978)
- Nico Santos (born 1979)
- Horatio Sanz (born 1969)
- Herb Sargent (1923–2005)
- Martin Sargent (born 1975)
- Will Sasso (born 1975)
- Drake Sather (1959–2004)
- Sabrina Sato (born 1981)
- Rajiv Satyal (born 1976)
- Jennifer Saunders (born 1958)
- Andrea Savage (born 1973)
- Ben Savage (born 1980)
- Fred Savage (born 1976)
- Julia Sawalha (born 1968)
- Alexei Sayle (born 1952)
- Prunella Scales (1932–2025)
- Brendan Scannell (born 1990)
- Kristen Schaal (born 1978)
- Sara Schaefer (born 1978)
- Akiva Schaffer (born 1977)
- Jackie Schaffer
- Jeff Schaffer (born 1970)
- Lewis Schaffer (born 1957)
- Tom Scharpling (born 1969)
- Mary Scheer (born 1963)
- Paul Scheer (born 1976)
- Ronnie Schell (1931–2026)
- Gus Schilling (1908–1957)
- Robert Schimmel (1950–2010)
- Hayden Schlossberg (born 1978)
- Art Paul Schlosser (born 1960)
- Wilfried Schmickler (born 1954)
- Harald Schmidt (born 1957)
- Jana Schmieding (born 1981)
- Ralf Schmitz (born 1974)
- Dan Schneider (born 1966)
- Danielle Schneider (born 1975)
- Helge Schneider (born 1955)
- Martin Schneider (born 1964)
- Rob Schneider (born 1963)
- Sarah Schneider (born 1983)
- Stephen Schneider (born 1980)
- Barbara Schöneberger (born 1974)
- Avery Schreiber (1935–2002)
- Paul Schrier (born 1970)
- Atze Schröder (born 1965)
- Olaf Schubert (born 1967)
- Richard Schull (1929–1999)
- Andrew Schulz (born 1983)
- Amy Schumer (born 1981)
- Michael Schur (born 1975)
- Leon Schuster (born 1951)
- Samba Schutte (born 1983)
- Ben Schwartz (born 1981)
- Jason Schwartzman (born 1980)
- Esther Schweins (born 1970)
- David Schwimmer (born 1966)
- Peter Scolari (1955–2021)
- Brian Scolaro (born 1973)
- Adam Scott (born 1973)
- Reid Scott (born 1977)
- Tom Everett Scott (born 1970)
- Seann William Scott (born 1976)
- Rory Scovel (born 1980)
- Amanda Seales (born 1981)
- Kenny Sebastian (born 1990)
- Harry Secombe (1921–2001)
- Amy Sedaris (born 1961)
- Sam Seder (born 1966)
- Rhea Seehorn (born 1972)
- George Segal (1934–2021)
- Jason Segel (born 1980)
- Tom Segura (born 1979)
- Streeter Seidell (born 1982)
- Jerry Seinfeld (born 1954)
- Scott Seiss (born 1994)
- Jeffery Self (born 1987)
- Peter Sellers (1925–1980)
- Larry Semon (1889–1928)
- Mack Sennett (1880–1960)
- Rachel Sennott (born 1995)
- Peter Serafinowicz (born 1972)
- Josh Server (born 1979)
- Joshua Seth (born 1970)
- Glenn Shadix (1952–2010)
- Tom Shadyac (born 1958)
- Ross Shafer (born 1954)
- Paul Shaffer (born 1949)
- Ari Shaffir (born 1974)
- Ahir Shah (born 1990)
- Saagar Shaikh (born 1986)
- Tony Shalhoub (born 1953)
- Garry Shandling (1949–2016)
- Jake Shane (born 1999)
- Paul Shane (1940–2013)
- Rekha Shankar (born 1990)
- Molly Shannon (born 1964)
- Kapil Sharma (born 1981)
- Josh Sharp (born 1987)
- Timm Sharp (born 1978)
- William Shatner (born 1931)
- Alia Shawkat (born 1989)
- Dick Shawn (1923–1987)
- Wallace Shawn (born 1943)
- Lin Shaye (born 1943)
- Brendan Schaub (born 1983)
- Harry Shearer (born 1943)
- Reece Shearsmith (born 1969)
- Charlie Sheen (born 1965)
- Derek Sheen (born 1970/1971)
- David Sheffield (born 1948)
- Judy Sheindlin (born 1942)
- Angela V. Shelton (born 1970)
- Jack Shep (born 1999)
- Dax Shepard (born 1975)
- Cybill Shepherd (born 1950)
- Sherri Shepherd (born 1967)
- Waen Shepherd (born 1971)
- Eden Sher (born 1991)
- Rondell Sheridan (born 1958)
- Allan Sherman (1924–1973)
- Sarah Sherman (born 1993)
- Brad Sherwood (born 1964)
- Tom Shillue (born 1966)
- Ken Shimura (1950–2020)
- Kevin Shinick (born 1969)
- Iliza Shlesinger (born 1983)
- Craig Shoemaker (born 1962)
- Pauly Shore (born 1968)
- Sammy Shore (1928–2019)
- Martin Short (born 1950)
- Pat Shortt (born 1967)
- Michael Showalter (born 1970)
- Wil Shriner (born 1953)
- Jimmy Shubert
- Rosie Shuster (born 1950)
- Ritch Shydner (born 1952)
- Ali Siddiq (born 1973/1974)
- Emma Sidi (born 1991)
- George Sidney (1876–1945)
- Denny Siegel
- Jamie-Lynn Sigler (born 1981)
- Darien Sills-Evans (born 1974)
- Laura Silverman (born 1966)
- Sarah Silverman (born 1970)
- Phil Silvers (1911–1985)
- Arthur Simeon (born 1974)
- John Simmit (born 1963)
- Sam Simmons (born 1977)
- Hannah Simone (born 1980)
- Timothy Simons (born 1978)
- Jimmi Simpson (born 1975)
- Joan Sims (1930–2001)
- Sinbad (born 1956)
- Akaash Singh (born 1984)
- Lilly Singh (born 1988)
- Hella von Sinnen (born 1959)
- Tiya Sircar (born 1982)
- Dave Sirus
- Charlie Skelton
- Red Skelton (1913–1997)
- Benito Skinner (born 1993)
- Frank Skinner (born 1957)
- Chuck Sklar
- Jenny Slate (born 1982)
- Tony Slattery (1959–2025)
- Jonathan Slavin (born 1969)
- Dusty Slay (born 1982)
- Bobby Slayton (born 1955)
- Dulcé Sloan (born 1983)
- Lindsay Sloane (born 1977)
- Daniel Sloss (born 1990)
- Veronika Slowikowska (born 1995)
- Brendon Small (born 1975)
- Lucien "Saluche" Small (1948–2007)
- Andy Smart (1959–2023)
- Jean Smart (born 1951)
- Robert Smigel (born 1960)
- Rickey Smiley (born 1968)
- Yakov Smirnoff (born 1951)
- Arthur Smith (born 1954)
- Brandon Mychal Smith (born 1989)
- Brian Thomas Smith (born 1977)
- Daniel Browning Smith (born 1979)
- DeAnne Smith (born 1979)
- Joe Smith (1884–1981)
- Kevin Smith (born 1970)
- Kurtwood Smith (born 1943)
- Linda Smith (1958–2006)
- Margaret Smith
- Phyllis Smith (born 1949)
- Steve Smith (born 1945)
- Will Smith (born 1968)
- Will Smith (born 1971)
- Yeardley Smith (born 1964)
- JB Smoove (born 1965)
- Cobie Smulders (born 1982)
- Dana Snyder (born 1973)
- Liza Snyder (born 1968)
- David So (born 1987)
- Barry Sobel (born 1959)
- Betsy Sodaro (born 1984)
- Dan Soder (born 1983)
- Chariz Solomon (born 1989)
- John Solomon (born 1970)
- Laura Solon (born 1979)
- Joey Soloway (born 1965)
- Lion Solser (1877–1915)
- Kira Soltanovich (born 1973)
- Suzanne Somers (1946–2023)
- Rich Sommer (born 1978)
- Sommore (born 1966)
- Alex Song-Xia (born 1993)
- Karan Soni (born 1989)
- Gianmarco Soresi (born 1989)
- AC Soriano (born 1994)
- Arleen Sorkin (1955–2023)
- Ann Sothern (1909–2001)
- Tito Sotto (born 1948)
- Vic Sotto (born 1954)
- Karla Souza (born 1985)
- Kevin Spacey (born 1959)
- David Spade (born 1964)
- Hal Sparks (born 1969)
- Ron Sparks (born 1977)
- Aries Spears (born 1975)
- Rachel Specter (born 1980)
- Chris Spencer (born 1968)
- Dave Spikey (born 1950)
- Brent Spiner (born 1949)
- Justin Spitzer
- Thomas Spitzer (born 1988)
- Emily Spivey (born 1971)
- Sahana Srinivasan (born 1996)
- Brian Stack (born 1964)
- Jessica St. Clair (born 1976)
- Jim Stafford (born 1944)
- Megan Stalter (born 1990)
- John Stamos (born 1963)
- Arnold Stang (1918–2009)
- Doug Stanhope (born 1967)
- Vivian Stanshall (1943–1995)
- Martin Starr (born 1982)
- Jen Statsky (born 1985)
- Mark Steel (born 1960)
- Steve Steen (born 1954)
- Mary Steenburgen (born 1953)
- Rob Stefaniuk (born 1971)
- Axel Stein (born 1982)
- Ben Stein (born 1944)
- David Steinberg (born 1942)
- Beth Stelling (born 1986)
- Brian Stepanek (born 1971)
- Jason Stephens
- Pamela Stephenson (born 1949)
- Skip Stephenson (1940–1992)
- Ford Sterling (1883–1939)
- Mindy Sterling (born 1953)
- Howard Stern (born 1954)
- Steve-O (born 1974)
- Michael Fenton Stevens (born 1958)
- Brody Stevens (1970–2019)
- Ray Stevens (born 1939)
- McLean Stevenson (1927–1996)
- French Stewart (born 1964)
- Jon Stewart (born 1962)
- Paul Stewart (1908–1986)
- David Ogden Stiers (1942–2018)
- Ryan Stiles (born 1959)
- Ben Stiller (born 1965)
- Jerry Stiller (1927–2020)
- Jeff Stilson (born 1959)
- Iain Stirling (born 1988)
- Hannah Stocking (born 1992)
- Fred Stoller (born 1958)
- Nicholas Stoller (born 1976)
- Matt Stone (born 1971)
- Eric Stonestreet (born 1971)
- Larry Storch (1923–2022)
- Gale Storm (1922–2009)
- Moses Storm (born 1990)
- Tom Stourton (born 1987)
- Ryan Stout (born 1982)
- Michael Strahan (born 1971)
- Michael Strassner (born 1989)
- Cordula Stratmann (born 1963)
- Paul Strickland (born ?)
- Elaine Stritch (1925–2014)
- Cecily Strong (born 1984)
- Rider Strong (born 1979)
- Jessica Stroup (born 1986)
- Jud Strunk (1936–1981)
- James Patrick Stuart (born 1968)
- Geoff Stults (born 1976)
- Jason Sudeikis (born 1975)
- Chris Sugden (born 1952)
- Mollie Sugden (1922–2009)
- Olivia Sui (born 1993)
- Alec Sulkin (born 1973)
- Nancy Sullivan (born 1969)
- Nicole Sullivan (born 1970)
- Marc Summers (born 1951)
- Jiaoying Summers (born 1990)
- Slim Summerville (1892–1946)
- Tika Sumpter (born 1980)
- Josh Sundquist (born 1984)
- Ethan Suplee (born 1976)
- Kevin Sussman (born 1970)
- Mena Suvari (born 1979)
- Chrissie Swan (born 1973)
- Nick Swardson (born 1976)
- John Swartzwelder (born 1949)
- Barret Swatek (born 1977)
- Jim Sweeney (born 1955)
- Julia Sweeney (born 1959)
- Steve Sweeney (born 1949)
- Terry Sweeney (born 1950)
- C. C. Swiney (born 1981)
- JoAnna Garcia Swisher (born 1979)
- Eric Sykes (1923–2012)
- Wanda Sykes (born 1964)
- Cynthia Szigeti (1949–2016)
- Magda Szubanski (born 1961)

=== T ===
- Jorma Taccone (born 1977)
- Mari Takahashi (born 1984)
- George Takei (born 1937)
- Rich Talarico (born 1973)
- Jill Talley (born 1962)
- Chris Tallman (born 1970)
- Kerry Talmage (1963–2004)
- Kapil Talwalkar (born 1993)
- Danny Tamberelli (born 1982)
- Jeffrey Tambor (born 1944)
- Jimmy Tarbuck (born 1940)
- Liza Tarbuck (born 1964)
- Carl Tart (born 1989)
- Drew Tarver (born 1986)
- Emily Tarver (born 1982)
- Masashi Tashiro (born 1956)
- Catherine Tate (born 1969)
- Jacques Tati (1907–1982)
- Jimmy Tatro (born 1992)
- Jim Tavaré (born 1963)
- Christine Taylor (born 1971)
- Clarice Taylor (1917–2011)
- Ellie Taylor (born 1983)
- Johnny Taylor Jr.
- Maddie Taylor (born 1966)
- Paul Taylor (born 1986)
- Renée Taylor (born 1933)
- Rip Taylor (1931–2019)
- Tariq Teddy (1976–2022)
- Chrissy Teigen (born 1985)
- Teller (born 1948)
- Miles Teller (born 1987)
- Judy Tenuta (1949–2022)
- Steve Terreberry (born 1987)
- Maria Thayer (born 1975)
- Robin Thede (born 1979)
- Justin Theroux (born 1971)
- Alan Thicke (1947–2016)
- Owen Thiele (born 1996)
- Terry-Thomas (1911–1990)
- Danny Thomas (1914–1991)
- Dave Thomas (born 1949)
- Eddie Kaye Thomas (born 1980)
- Jay Thomas (1948–2017)
- Joe Thomas (born 1983)
- Josh Thomas (born 1987)
- Kathryn Renée Thomas
- Mark Thomas (born 1967)
- Marlo Thomas (born 1937)
- Meredith Thomas (born 1971)
- Michelle Thomas (1968–1998)
- Vinny Thomas (born 1997)
- Whitmer Thomas (born 1989)
- Tim Thomerson (born 1946)
- Greg Thomey (born 1961)
- Bobb'e J. Thompson (born 1996)
- Dave Thompson (born 1959)
- Emma Thompson (born 1959)
- Josh Robert Thompson (born 1975)
- Kenan Thompson (born 1978)
- Lea Thompson (born 1961)
- Scott Thompson (born 1959)
- Siobhan Thompson (born 1984)
- Nick Thune (born 1979)
- Baratunde Thurston (born 1977)
- Sarah Thyre (born 1968)
- Jenny Tian (born 1995)
- Kai Tier
- Tommy Tiernan (born 1969)
- Greta Titelman (born 1990)
- Christopher Titus (born 1964)
- Mukesh Tiwari (born 1969)
- Stephen Tobolowsky (born 1951)
- Thelma Todd (1905–1935)
- Jackie Tohn (born 1980)
- Sandi Toksvig (born 1958)
- Steph Tolev (born 1985)
- Judy Toll (1958–2002)
- Allison Tolman (born 1981)
- James Tom (born 1990)
- Lily Tomlin (born 1939)
- Cooper Tomlinson (born 1999)
- David Tomlinson (1917–2000)
- Taylor Tomlinson (born 1993)
- Paul F. Tompkins (born 1968)
- TomSka (born 1990)
- Paul Tonkinson (born 1969)
- Barry Took (1928–2002)
- Shayne Topp (born 1991)
- Rip Torn (1931–2019)
- Nate Torrence (born 1977)
- Julio Torres (born 1987)
- Liz Torres (born 1947)
- Guy Torry (born 1969)
- Joe Torry (born 1965)
- Daniel Tosh (born 1975)
- Josie Totah (born 2001)
- Robert Townsend (born 1957)
- Jerry Trainor (born 1977)
- Natalie Tran (born 1986)
- Robin Tran (born 1986)
- Rosie Tran (born 1984)
- Tien Tran (born 1987)
- Nancy Travis (born 1961)
- Oliver Tree (1993–2026)
- Lorna Rose Treen (born 1994)
- Jesus Trejo (born 1986)
- Harry Trevaldwyn (born 1994)
- Liza Treyger (born 1987)
- Angela Trimbur (born 1981)
- Tommy Trinder (1909–1989)
- Chloe Troast (born 1997)
- Verne Troyer (1969–2018)
- Duncan Trussell (born 1974)
- Nora Tschirner (born 1981)
- Irene Tu (born 1992)
- Bryan Tucker
- Chris Tucker (born 1971)
- Alan Tudyk (born 1971)
- Jane Turner (born 1960)
- Toby Turner (born 1985)
- Ben Turpin (1869–1940)
- Aisha Tyler (born 1970)

=== U ===
- Alanna Ubach (born 1975)
- Bob Uecker (1934–2025)
- Ikechukwu Ufomadu (born 1986)
- Tracey Ullman (born 1959)
- Sheryl Underwood (born 1963)
- Brian Unger (born 1965)
- Gabrielle Union (born 1972)
- Stanley Unwin (1911–2002)
- James Urbaniak (born 1963)
- Michael Urie (born 1980)

=== V ===
- John Valby, aka Dr. Dirty (born 1944)
- Wilmer Valderrama (born 1980)
- Ramón Valdés (1923–1988)
- Jack Vale (born 1973)
- Billy Van (1934–2003)
- Dick Van Dyke (born 1925)
- Jerry Van Dyke (1931–2018)
- Dick Van Patten (1928–2015)
- Danitra Vance (1954–1994)
- Nia Vardalos (born 1962)
- Tuesday Vargas (born 1980)
- Janet Varney (born 1976)
- Jim Varney (1949–2000)
- Reg Varney (1916–2008)
- Johnny Vaughan (born 1966)
- Baron Vaughn (born 1980)
- Vince Vaughn (born 1970)
- Milana Vayntrub (born 1987)
- Radhika Vaz (born 1973)
- Jennifer Veal (born 1991)
- Sindhu Vee (born 1969)
- Johnny Vegas (born 1970)
- Ricky Velez (born 1989)
- Reginald VelJohnson (born 1952)
- Vinny Vella (1947–2019)
- Prashanth Venkataramanujam (born 1987)
- Milo Ventimiglia (born 1977)
- Sofia Vergara (born 1972)
- Tom Verica (born 1964)
- Andrée Vermeulen (born 1982)
- Jackie Vernon (1924–1987)
- Wally Vernon (1904–1970)
- Vice Ganda (born 1976)
- Eva Victor
- John Viener (born 1972)
- Gillian Vigman (born 1972)
- Kulap Vilaysack (born 1980)
- Nova Villa (born 1946)
- Carlos Villagrán (born 1942)
- Buboy Villar (born 1998)
- Melissa Villaseñor (born 1987)
- Hervé Villechaize (1943–1993)
- Tim Vine (born 1967)
- Geraldine Viswanathan (born 1995)
- Jon Vitti (born 1960)
- Édgar Vivar (born 1944)
- Paul C. Vogt (born 1964)
- Theo Von (born 1980)
- Daniel von Bargen (1950–2015)
- Jenna von Oÿ (born 1977)
- Rich Vos (born 1957)
- Sal Vulcano (born 1976)

=== W ===
- Otto Waalkes (born 1948)
- Nina Wadia (born 1968)
- Mark Wahlberg (born 1971)
- David Wain (born 1969)
- Lena Waithe (born 1984)
- Taika Waititi (born 1975)
- Emil Wakim (born 1998)
- Eliot Wald (1946–2003)
- Gary Waldhorn (1943–2022)
- Christopher Walken (born 1943)
- Benjamin Walker (born 1982)
- Devon Walker (born 1991)
- Doug Walker (born 1981)
- Holly Walker (born 1967)
- Jimmie Walker (born 1947)
- Nancy Walker (1922–1992)
- Roy Walker (born 1940)
- Max Wall (1908–1990)
- Danny Wallace (born 1976)
- George Wallace (1895–1960)
- George Wallace Jnr (1918–1968)
- George Wallace (born 1952)
- Trevor Wallace (born 1992)
- Linda Wallem (born 1961)
- Phoebe Waller-Bridge (born 1985)
- David Walliams (born 1971)
- Ruth Wallis (1920–2007)
- Greg Walloch (born 1970)
- Bradley Walsh (born 1960)
- Brendon Walsh (born 1978)
- Holly Walsh (born 1980)
- Kate Walsh (born 1967)
- Mary Walsh (born 1952)
- Matt Walsh (born 1964)
- Ray Walston (1914–2001)
- Jessica Walter (1941–2021)
- Lisa Ann Walter (born 1963)
- Julie Walters (born 1950)
- David Walton (born 1978)
- Christoph Waltz (born 1956)
- Phil Wang (born 1990)
- Sheng Wang (born 1980)
- Keith Wann (born 1969)
- Patrick Warburton (born 1964)
- Asha Ward (born 1999)
- Mike Ward (born 1973)
- Brandon Wardell (born 1992)
- Eric Wareheim (born 1976)
- Marsha Warfield (born 1954)
- Malcolm-Jamal Warner (1970–2025)
- Mike Warnke (born 1946)
- Rusty Warren (1930–2021)
- Sydnee Washington
- Derek Waters (born 1979)
- Michaela Watkins (born 1971)
- Reggie Watts (born 1972)
- Ruby Wax (born 1953)
- Damon Wayans (born 1960)
- Damon Wayans Jr. (born 1982)
- Keenen Ivory Wayans (born 1958)
- Kim Wayans (born 1961)
- Marlon Wayans (born 1972)
- Shawn Wayans (born 1971)
- Louis Waymouth (born 1978)
- Kountry Wayne (born 1987)
- Robert Webb (born 1972)
- Steven Weber (born 1961)
- Fred Wedlock (1942–2010)
- Lauren Weedman (born 1969)
- Ed Weeks (born 1980)
- Henning Wehn (born 1974)
- Brent Weinbach
- Stephnie Weir (born 1967)
- Shaun Weiss (born 1979)
- Lawrence Welk (1903–1992)
- Oliver Welke (born 1966)
- Danny Wells (1941–2013)
- Noël Wells (born 1986)
- George Wendt (1948–2025)
- Ali Wentworth (born 1965)
- Tatá Werneck (born 1983)
- Amber Stevens West (born 1986)
- Billy West (born 1952)
- Lindy West (born 1982)
- Celia Weston (born 1951)
- Alice Wetterlund (born 1981)
- Frank Whaley (born 1963)
- Wil Wheaton (born 1972)
- Brooks Wheelan (born 1986)
- Bert Wheeler (1895–1968)
- Jill Whelan (born 1966)
- Betty White (1922–2021)
- Ellie White (born 1989)
- Jaleel White (born 1976)
- Mike White (born 1970)
- Ron White (born 1956)
- Slappy White (1921–1995)
- June Whitfield (1925–2018)
- Jack Whitehall (born 1988)
- Jason John Whitehead
- Paul Whitehouse (born 1958)
- Bradley Whitford (born 1959)
- Kym Whitley (born 1961)
- Mae Whitman (born 1988)
- Jane Wickline (born 1999)
- Josh Widdicombe (born 1983)
- Nick Wiger (born 1980)
- Tracey Wigfield (born 1983)
- Kristen Wiig (born 1973)
- Brian Wilde (1927–2008)
- Stefanie Wilder-Taylor
- Fred Willard (1933–2020)
- Ben Willbond (born 1973)
- Allison Williams (born 1988)
- Anson Williams (born 1949)
- Ashley Williams (born 1978)
- Barney Williams (1824–1876)
- Barry Williams (born 1954)
- Bert Williams (1874–1922)
- Brad Williams (born 1984)
- Charlie Williams (1927–2006)
- Chris Williams (born 1967)
- Cindy Williams (1947–2023)
- Ellis E. Williams (born 1951)
- Gary Anthony Williams (born 1966)
- Harland Williams (born 1962)
- Jessica Williams (born 1989)
- Katt Williams (born 1971)
- Kenneth Williams (1926–1988)
- Kimberly Williams-Paisley (born 1971)
- Liam Williams (born 1988)
- Mason Williams (born 1938)
- Robin Williams (1951–2014)
- Tacarra Williams
- Tyler James Williams (born 1992)
- Victor Williams (born 1970)
- Wendy Williams (born 1964)
- Dave Williamson
- Taylor Williamson
- Cardis Cardell Willis (1937–2007)
- Dave Willis (born 1970)
- Dave Willis (1895–1973)
- Denny Willis (1920–1995)
- Justin Willman (born 1980)
- Emma Willmann (born 1985)
- Holly Willoughby (born 1981)
- Larry Wilmore (born 1961)
- Cal Wilson (1970–2023)
- Casey Wilson (born 1980)
- Debra Wilson (born 1962)
- Demond Wilson (born 1946)
- Flip Wilson (1933–1998)
- Lou Wilson (born 1991)
- Luke Wilson (born 1971)
- Mary Louise Wilson (born 1931)
- Owen Wilson (born 1968)
- Rainn Wilson (born 1966)
- Rebel Wilson (born 1980)
- Reno Wilson (born 1969)
- Thomas F. Wilson (born 1959)
- Bob Wiltfong (born 1969)
- April Winchell (born 1960)
- Henry Winkler (born 1945)
- Mel Winkler (1941–2020)
- Lizz Winstead (born 1961)
- Jonathan Winters (1925–2013)
- Norman Wisdom (1915–2010)
- Beverly "Pudgy" Wisniewski (1946–2007)
- Chris Witaske (born 1983)
- Brenda Withers
- Harris Wittels (1984–2015)
- Fred Wolf (born 1964)
- Michelle Wolf (born 1985)
- Dennis Wolfberg (1946–1994)
- Jason Woliner (born 1980)
- Ivy Wolk (born 2004)
- Ali Wong (born 1982)
- Jimmy Wong (born 1987)
- Kristina Wong (born 1978)
- Roy Wood Jr. (born 1978)
- Victoria Wood (1953–2016)
- Danny Woodburn (born 1964)
- Kim Woodburn (1942–2025)
- Zach Woods (born 1984)
- Glenn Wool (born 1974)
- Sheb Wooley (1921–2003)
- Robert Woolsey (1888–1938)
- Tom Wopat (born 1951)
- Harry Worth (1917–1989)
- Mike Wozniak (born 1979)
- Edgar Wright (born 1974)
- Steven Wright (born 1955)
- Sabrina Wu (born 1998)
- Robert Wuhl (born 1951)
- Chris Wylde (born 1976)
- Ed Wynn (1886–1966)
- Jacob Wysocki (born 1990)

=== X ===
- Swami X (1925–2015)

=== Y ===
- Rajpal Yadav (born 1971)
- Marc Yaffee (born 1961)
- Kaya Yanar (born 1973)
- Alan Yang (born 1983)
- Bowen Yang (born 1990)
- Eugene Lee Yang (born 1986)
- Jenny Yang (born 1990)
- Jimmy O. Yang (born 1987)
- "Weird Al" Yankovic (born 1959)
- Cedric Yarbrough (born 1973)
- Mike Yard
- Mike Yarwood (1941–2023)
- Gina Yashere (born 1974)
- Lucky Yates (born 1967)
- Dustin Ybarra (born 1986)
- Steven Yeun (born 1983)
- Charlyne Yi (born 1986)
- Cem Yılmaz (born 1973)
- Celeste Yim (born 1996)
- Michael Yo (born 1974)
- Aaron Yonda (born 1973)
- Dwight York
- Heléne Yorke (born 1985)
- Alan Young (1919–2016)
- Bill Young (died 2014)
- Paddy Young (born 1991/1992)
- Parker Young (born 1988)
- Rick Younger (born 1969)
- Henny Youngman (1906–1998)
- Jaboukie Young-White (born 1994)
- Hampton Yount (born 1984)
- Bassem Youssef (born 1974)
- Ramy Youssef (born 1991)
- Joe Yule (1892–1950)
- Imran Yusuf (born 1979)

=== Z ===
- Tincho Zabala (1923–2001)
- Hollywood Zakoshisyoh (born 1974)
- Andy Zaltzman (born 1974)
- Sasheer Zamata (born 1986)
- Katya Zamolodchikova
- Alex Zane (born 1979)
- Bob Zany (born 1961)
- Steve Zahn (born 1967)
- Steve Zaragoza (born 1982)
- Vitaly Zdorovetskiy (born 1992)
- Volodymyr Zelenskyy (born 1978)
- Henry Zebrowski (born 1984)
- David Zed
- Mather Zickel (born 1970)
- Dolph Ziggler (born 1980)
- Jenny Zigrino (born 1987)
- Steve Zissis (born 1975)
- Tay Zonday (born 1982)
- Alan Zweibel (born 1950)

== Comedy groups ==
- Ace Trucking Company
- Ant & Dec
- Armstrong and Miller
- Abbott and Costello
- Barats and Bereta
- Beyond the Fringe
- Bob and Ray
- Bonzo Dog Doo-Dah Band
- BriTANicK
- Broken Lizard
- Brown and Carney
- Burns and Allen
- CollegeHumor
- The Chaser
- Les Charlots
- Cheech and Chong
- Clark and McCullough
- The Comedy Store Players
- The Comic Strip
- The Firesign Theatre
- Flight of the Conchords
- Frangela
- The Frat Pack
- French and Saunders
- Fry and Laurie
- Garfunkel and Oates
- God's Pottery
- The Goons
- The Grumbleweeds
- Hale and Pace
- Hamish and Andy
- Hard 'n Phirm
- Homer and Jethro
- Jackass
- Key and Peele
- The Kids in the Hall
- The Kipper Kids
- Kreisiraadio from Estonia
- Lano and Woodley
- Laurel and Hardy
- The League of Gentlemen
- Little Britain
- The Little Rascals
- The Lonely Island
- Les Luthiers
- The Lucas Brothers
- Marijuana Logues
- Martin and Lewis
- Marx Brothers
- McKenzie Brothers
- The Mighty Boosh
- Million Dollar Extreme
- The Minnesota Wrecking Crew
- Mitchell and Webb
- Monty Python
- Morecambe and Wise
- Not Ready for Prime-Time Players (Saturday Night Live)
- Paul and Storm
- Penn & Teller
- Pete and Dud
- Phil Lord and Christopher Miller
- Please Don't Destroy
- Punt and Dennis
- Reeves and Mortimer
- Rhett & Link
- The Ritz Brothers
- Rowan and Martin
- Royal Canadian Air Farce
- Scotland the What?
- Sklar Brothers
- Smith and Dale
- Smosh
- Smothers Brothers
- Stella
- Stiller and Meara
- Studio C
- Tenacious D
- The Tenderloins
- The Three Stooges
- Tim and Eric
- The Try Guys
- The Umbilical Brothers
- Upright Citizens Brigade
- Vanoss Crew/Banana Bus Squad
- The Valleyfolk
- Vinesauce
- Wayne and Shuster
- Wheeler and Woolsey
- The Whitest Kids U' Know
- Williams and Ree
- Wolves of Glendale

== Comedy writers ==
(sorted alphabetically by surname)

- Douglas Adams (1952–2011)
- Fred Allen (1894–1956)
- Woody Allen (born 1935)
- Tony Barbieri (born 1963)
- Chesney and Wolfe
- Roy Clarke (born 1930)
- Dick Clement (born 1937)
- David Croft (1922–2011)
- Barry Cryer (1935–2022)
- Esmonde and Larbey
- Galton and Simpson
- W. S. Gilbert
- Willis Hall (1929–2005)
- Antony Jay (1930-2016)
- Carla Lane (1928–2016)
- Ian La Frenais (born 1937)
- Graham Linehan
- Jeremy Lloyd (1930–2014)
- Arthur Mathews
- David Nobbs
- Simon Nye
- Frank Muir
- Denis Norden
- S. J. Perelman
- Jimmy Perry
- David Renwick
- Jack Rosenthal (1931-2004)
- David Sedaris (born 1956)
- Gerardo Sofovich (1937–2015)
- Hugo Sofovich (1939–2003)
- Johnny Speight (1920-1998)
- John Sullivan (1946-2011)
- James Thurber (1894-1961)
- Peter Tinniswood (1936-2003)
- Zoë Tomalin
- Keith Waterhouse (1929-2009)

== See also ==
Lists of comedians by nationality

- List of Australian comedians
- List of British comedians
- List of Canadian comedians
- List of Dutch comedians
- List of Finnish comedians
- List of German comedians
- List of Indian comedians
- List of Italian comedians
- List of Japanese comedians
- List of Mexican comedians
- List of Norwegian comedians
- List of Portuguese comedians
- List of Puerto Rican comedians
- List of United States stand-up comedians

Other related lists

- List of comedy films
- List of deadpan comedians
- List of humorists
- List of musical comedians
- List of New York Improv comedians
- List of stand-up comedians
