= Swami X =

America boardwalk performer and comedian

Harry W. Hart, known by the stage name Swami X, (November 1925, Philadelphia, Pennsylvania—August 29, 2015, Los Angeles, California) was an American boardwalk performer and stand-up comedian. Active from the 1970s to 1985, he performed in Los Angeles, San Francisco, Berkeley, and New York. He was known for bawdy sexual humor and political invective.

== Biography ==
Hart was born in mid-November 1925 in Philadelphia, Pennsylvania. He died at age 89 on August 29, 2015 at the home of former Los Angeles City Councilman Bill Rosendahl.

== Career ==
Swami X's act was a monologue mixing pithy sociopolitical observations with poetry, sarcasm and humor, which typically included blasphemy, profanity, and attacking "sacred cows"—producing "pleased shock and delighted outrage" in observers. His notable lines include:

- "Sex is not the answer. Sex is the question. 'Yes' is the answer."
- "How do we know Jesus Christ was Jewish? Because he went into His Father's business."
- "If I had known I would live this long, I would have taken better care of myself".
- "You are what you eat. If that's true, then I'm a nymphomaniac".

He was known for appearing on the Venice Boardwalk, at the UCLA and U.C. Berkeley campuses, in San Francisco, and at Washington Park in New York City. He retired in 1985. In 2009 the mayor of Los Angeles, Antonio Villaraigosa, presented him with an official proclamation.

Swami X appears as a character in Roger L. Simon's mystery novel, The Straight Man and is referenced in Pat Hartman's volume of Venice vignettes, Call Someplace Paradise.

== See also ==
- Busking
