= List of Dutch comedians =

This is a list of Dutch comedians who are internationally known or notable in the Netherlands.

- Najib Amhali
- Claudia de Breij
- Hans Dorrestijn
- André van Duin
- Herman Finkers
- Seth Gaaikema
- Ronald Goedemondt
- Paul Haenen
- Raoul Heertje
- Toon Hermans
- Youp van 't Hek
- Dolf Jansen
- Freek de Jonge
- Brigitte Kaandorp
- Wim Kan
- John Kraaijkamp, Sr.
- Daniel Arends
- Paul de Leeuw – also a singer
- Theo Maassen
- Bueno de Mesquita
- Sylvia Millecam
- Stefan Pop
- Jörgen Raymann – also a television presenter and associated with Suriname
- Wim Sonneveld
- Hans Teeuwen
- Micha Wertheim

== See also ==
- Cabaret
- List of comedians
- List of Dutch people
