= List of Finnish comedians =

This is a list of Finnish comedians.

- Viktor Kalborrek
- Ismo Leikola
- Vesa-Matti Loiri
- Spede Pasanen
- Pirkka-Pekka Petelius
- Krisse Salminen
- Simo Salminen
- Pentti Siimes
- André Wickström
- Sami Hedberg
- Iikka Kivi

== See also ==
- List of comedians
- List of Finnish people
