= Brian Miner =

American comedian (born 1981)

Brian Daniel Miner (born March 27, 1981) is an American comedian and satirist. He is known for his co-creation of the live sketch comedy series The Crippling Thoughts of Victor Bonesteel along with fellow writer and comedian Bryan Finnigan.

== Presidential campaign ==
In July 2007, Miner launched a satirical campaign for President of the United States as a means of drawing attention to the 2008 election and encouraging people to vote. In his campaign, Miner plays the role of a naive and dangerously underqualified candidate.
