= List of Portuguese comedians =

This is a list of Portuguese comedians sorted by last name:

- David Cristina
- André de Freitas
- Marco Horácio
- Herman José
- Nuno Markl
- Bruno Nogueira
- Ricardo Araújo Pereira
- Fernando Rocha
- Raúl Solnado

== See also ==
- List of comedians
- List of Portuguese people
