= Bobbie Baker =

American comedian

Bobbie Baker is amongst the long list of comedians who appeared on The Ed Sullivan Show. There were two appearances in 1962.
