= List of Mexican comedians =

This is a list of famous Mexican comedians.

== A ==
- Cristela Alonzo

== B ==
- Chingo Bling
- Roberto Gomez Bolaños

== C ==
- Cantinflas
- Capulina
- Cessy Casanova
- Roxana Castellanos
- Benito Castro
- Xavier López "Chabelo"
- Omar Chaparro

== D ==
- Arath de la Torre
- Maria Alicia Delgado
- Eugenio Derbez
- Consuelo Duval

== E ==
- Mara Escalante
- Franco Escamilla
- Felipe Esparza
- Carlos Espejel

== F ==
- Jorge Falcón
- Pablo Francisco
- Anabel Ferreira
- Franco Escamilla

== H ==
- Gaspar Henaine

== I ==
- Gabriel Iglesias

== L ==
- George Lopez

== O ==
- Jorge Ortiz de Pinedo

== P ==
- Aida Pierce

== R ==
- Adal Ramones
- Alex Reymundo
- Guillermo Rivas
- Paul Rodriguez

== S ==
- María Elena Saldaña
- Freddy Soto
- Paco Stanley
- Hector Suarez
- Louis Szekely (Louis C.K.)

== T ==
- Sheyla Tadeo
- Victor Trujillo
- Tin Tan

== V ==
- Angélica Vale
- Germán Valdés
- Manuel Valdés
- Ramón Valdés
- María Elena Velasco
- Carlos Villagrán
- David Villalpando
- Viruta
