= List of New York Improv comedians =

This is a partial list of New York Improv comedians and singers. In the 1960s, 1970s and 1980s they performed regularly at the Improvisation Comedy Club. The Improv was founded by Budd Friedman and his then wife Silver Saundors Friedman in 1963, and was located at 358 West 44th Street, New York City, in an area known as Hell's Kitchen.

- Shelley Ackerman
- Bobby Alto
- Richard Belzer
- Elayne Boosler
- David Brenner
- Jimmy Brogan
- Ron Carey
- Billy Crystal
- Rodney Dangerfield
- Larry David
- John DeBellis
- Al Franken
- Gilbert Gottfried
- Allan Havey
- Gabe Kaplan
- Andy Kaufman
- Michael Patrick King
- Robert Klein
- Steve Landesberg
- Jay Leno
- Richard Lewis
- Lynne Lipton
- Bruce Mahler
- Ken Ober
- Rick Overton
- Joe Piscopo
- Freddie Prinze
- Richard Pryor
- Rita Rudner
- Lenny Schultz
- Ronnie Shakes
- Tim Thomerson
- Liz Torres
- Jimmie Walker
- Robert Wuhl
- Alan Zweibel
