= List of stand-up comedians =

The following is a list of notable stand-up comedians by nationality.

== Argentina ==
- Tato Bores
- Antonio Gasalla
- Jorge Guinzburg
- Enrique Pinti

== Australia ==
- Wil Anderson
- Carl Barron
- Anh Do
- Randy Feltface
- Kitty Flanagan
- Chris Franklin
- Hannah Gadsby
- Peter Helliar
- Adam Hills
- Dave Hughes
- Jim Jefferies
- Judith Lucy
- Paul McDermott
- Tim Minchin
- Julia Morris
- Rodney Rude
- Akmal Saleh
- Vince Sorrenti
- Kevin Bloody Wilson
- Rebel Wilson
- Paul Hogan

== Austria ==
- Alfred Dorfer
- Karl Farkas
- Josef Hader
- Michael Niavarani
- Alf Poier
- Helmut Qualtinger
- Lukas Resetarits

== Bangladesh ==
- Naveed Mahbub

== Belgium ==
- Alex Agnew
- Els de Schepper
- Wouter Deprez
- Bert Gabriëls
- Geert Hoste
- Bert Kruismans
- Urbanus
- Philippe Geubels

== Brazil ==
- Rafinha Bastos
- Oscar Filho
- Luiz França
- Danilo Gentili
- Fábio Porchat

== Colombia ==
- Andrés López

== Cuba ==
- Joey Diaz
- Leopoldo Fernández
- Guillermo Álvarez Guedes

== Denmark ==
- Casper Christensen
- Elias Ehlers
- GEO
- Jan Gintberg
- Sofie Hagen
- Lars Hjortshøj
- Martin Høgsted
- Frank Hvam
- Rune Klan
- Anders Matthesen
- Lasse Rimmer
- Simon Talbot
- Mikael Wulff

== Finland ==
- Sami Hedberg
- Ismo Leikola
- Jope Ruonansuu
- Stan Saanila
- Jaakko Saariluoma
- Krisse Salminen
- Markku Toikka
- André Wickström

== France ==
- Kev Adams
- Édouard Baer
- Guy Bedos
- Malik Bentalha
- Jean-Marie Bigard
- Éric Blanc
- Dany Boon
- Michel Boujenah
- Bourvil
- Nicolas Canteloup
- Alain Chabat
- Coluche
- Jamel Debbouze
- Pierre Desproges
- Raymond Devos
- Dieudonné
- Albert Dupontel
- Gad Elmaleh
- Florence Foresti
- Les Inconnus
- Thierry Le Luron
- Valérie Lemercier
- Pierre Palmade
- Anne Roumanoff
- Tomer Sisley
- Jean Yanne

== Germany ==
- Mario Barth
- Bülent Ceylan
- Anke Engelke
- Paco Erhard
- Heinz Erhardt
- Michael Herbig
- Eckart von Hirschhausen
- Hape Kerkeling
- Jürgen von der Lippe
- Felix Lobrecht
- Michael Mittermeier
- Dieter Nuhr
- Oliver Pocher
- Helge Schneider
- Martin Schneider
- Atze Schröder
- Hella von Sinnen
- Otto Waalkes
- Henning Wehn
- Kaya Yanar

== Hong Kong ==
- Jami Gong
- Michael Hui
- Vivek Mahbubani
- Cheuk Wan Chi
- Dayo Wong
- Jimmy O Yang

== Hungary ==
- Sándor Fábry
- Géza Hofi

== Iceland ==
- Jón Gnarr

== India ==
- Abish Mathew
- Ali Asgar
- Alexander Babu
- Anubhav Singh Bassi
- Appurv Gupta
- Atul Khatri
- Bhagwant Mann
- Bharti Singh
- Biswa Kalyan Rath
- Chandan Prabhakar
- Daniel Fernandes
- Govinda
- Gursimran Khamba
- Jamie Lever
- Johnny Lever
- Kanan Gill
- Kaneez Surka
- Kapil Sharma
- Kenny Sebastian
- Krushna Abhishek
- Kunal Kamra
- Manish Paul
- Munawar Faruqui
- Navin Prabhakar
- Palaniappan Manickam (Dr. Pal)
- Papa CJ
- Paresh Ganatra
- Preeti Ganguly
- Raju Srivastava
- Rakesh Bedi
- Ramesh Pisharody
- Rehman Khan
- Rohan Joshi
- Samay Raina
- Sanjay Rajoura
- Siddharth Sagar
- Sorabh Pant
- Sudesh Lehri
- Sumeet Raghavan
- Sumukhi Suresh
- Sunil Grover
- Sunil Pal
- Tanmay Bhat
- Urooj Ashfaq
- V.I.P.
- Vipul Goyal
- Vir Das
- Zakir Khan

== Indonesia ==
- Pandji Pragiwaksono
- Raditya Dika
- Rizky Firdaus Wijaksana, a.k.a. Uus

== Ireland ==
- Yasmine Akram
- Dave Allen
- Aisling Bea
- Des Bishop
- Blindboy Boatclub
- Catherine Bohart
- Robbie Bonham
- Robert Broderick
- Peadar de Burca
- Ed Byrne
- Jason Byrne
- Dave Callan
- Oliver Callan
- Fred Cooke
- Gary Cooke
- Risteárd Cooper
- Francis Cronin
- Jack Cruise
- Neil Delamere
- Aoife Dooley
- Gearoid Farrelly
- Tara Flynn
- PJ Gallagher
- Conal Gallen
- Brendan Grace
- Maeve Higgins
- Sharon Horgan
- Sean Hughes
- Jimeoin
- Mel Kelly
- Jon Kenny
- Patrick Kielty
- Michael Legge
- Katherine Lynch
- Ian Macpherson
- Andrew Maxwell
- Kevin McAleer
- Patrick McDonnell
- Joanne McNally
- David McSavage
- Spike Milligan
- Patrick Monahan
- Dylan Moran
- Dermot Morgan
- Barry Murphy
- Colin Murphy
- Graham Norton
- Dara Ó Briain
- Brendan O'Carroll
- Jimmy O'Dea
- David O'Doherty
- Chris O'Dowd
- Ardal O'Hanlon
- Deirdre O'Kane
- Bernard O'Shea
- Abie Philbin Bowman
- Al Porter
- Maureen Potter
- Jarlath Regan
- Hal Roach
- Joe Rooney
- Mario Rosenstock
- Cecil Sheridan
- Pat Shortt
- Karl Spain
- Alison Spittle
- Andrew Stanley
- Tommy Tiernan
- Niall Tóibín
- Paul Tylak
- Dermot Whelan
- Paul Woodfull

== Israel ==
- Adir Miller
- Naor Zion

== Italy ==
- Roberto Benigni
- Maurizio Crozza
- Fiorello
- Dario Fo
- Beppe Grillo
- Daniele Luttazzi
- Giorgio Panariello
- Franca Rame
- Franca Valeri
- Bice Valori

== Malawi ==
- Daliso Chaponda

== Malaysia ==
- Hannan Azlan
- Douglas Lim
- Harith Iskander
- Jason Leong
- Kavin Jayaram
- Nigel Ng
- Patrick Teoh
- Ronny Chieng

== Mexico ==
- Cantinflas
- Chespirito
- Luis de Alba
- Jorge Ortiz de Pinedo
- Polo Polo
- Adal Ramones

== Middle East ==
The first country listed is that of origin; the second is that in which the comedian achieved notability or most commonly performs.

- Ahmed Ahmed (Egypt; US)
- Nawaal Akram (Qatar)
- Imran Al Aradi (Bahrain)
- Fahad Albutairi (Saudi Arabia)
- Max Amini (Iran; US)
- Wonho Chung (Saudi Arabia)
- Omid Djalili (Iran; UK)
- Bassem Feghali (Lebanon)
- Ray Hanania (Palestine)
- Maz Jobrani (Iran; US)
- Aron Kader (Palestine; US)
- Ronnie Khalil (Egypt; US)
- Shappi Khorsandi (Iran; UK)
- Mina Liccione (US; UAE)
- Najee Mondalek (Lebanon)
- Dean Obeidallah (Palestine; US)
- Omar 'The White Sudani' Ramzi (Ireland/Sudan; Saudi Arabia)
- Ali Al Sayed (Dubai; UAE)
- Maysoon Zayid (Palestine; US)

== Netherlands ==
- Thomas Acda
- Najib Amhali
- Herman Finkers
- Ronald Goedemondt
- Javier Guzman
- Raoul Heertje
- Youp van 't Hek
- Freek de Jonge
- Paul de Leeuw
- Theo Maassen
- Patrick Meijer
- Hans Teeuwen
- Micha Wertheim

== New Zealand ==
- Jarred Christmas
- Rose Matafeo
- Jemaine Clement
- Jeremy Corbett
- Benjamin Crellin
- Rhys Darby
- Dai Henwood
- Ben Hurley
- Billy T. James
- Mike King
- Brendhan Lovegrove
- Bret McKenzie
- Cal Wilson
- Ewen Gilmour

== Nigeria ==
- Akpororo
- Ali Baba
- Ayo Makun
- Basketmouth
- Bovi Ugboma
- Helen Paul
- Okey Bakassi
- Real Warri Pikin

== Norway ==
- Zahid Ali
- Atle Antonsen
- Arthur Arntzen
- Øivind Blunck
- Espen Eckbo
- Harald Eia
- Åsleik Engmark
- Shabana Rehman Gaarder
- Johan Golden
- Hans Morten Hansen
- Harald Heide-Steen jr.
- Espen Beranek Holm
- Otto Jespersen
- Bård Tufte Johansen
- Leif Juster
- Are Kalvø
- Trond Kirkvaag
- Knut Lystad
- Lars Mjøen
- Bjørn Sand
- Hege Schøyen
- Linn Skåber
- Per Inge Torkelsen
- Kristian Valen
- Rolv Wesenlund

== Pakistan ==
- Khalid Abbas Dar
- Sohail Ahmed
- Moin Akhter
- Amanullah
- Rauf Lala
- Kumail Nanjiani
- Umer Sharif
- Shakeel Siddiqui
- Tariq Teddy
- Naseem Vicky

== Philippines ==
- Jose Manalo
- Wally Bayola
- Ai-Ai delas Alas
- K Brosas
- Allan K.
- John Lapus
- Rex Navarette
- Pokwang
- Tim Tayag
- Dolphy
- Panchito Alba
- Vic Sotto
- Vice Ganda
- Redford White
- Babalu
- Benjie Paras
- Vhong Navarro
- Jhong Hilario

== Poland ==
- Wojciech Cejrowski
- Abelard Giza
- Grzegorz Halama
- Jej Perfekcyjność

== Portugal ==
- Herman José
- Nuno Markl
- Bruno Nogueira
- Ricardo Araújo Pereira
- Zé Diogo Quintela
- Raúl Solnado

== Russia ==
- Arkady Arkanov
- Maxim Galkin
- Mikhail Galustyan
- Gennady Khazanov
- Garik Martirosyan
- Sergei Svetlakov
- Klara Novikova
- Yevgeny Petrosyan
- Arkady Raikin
- Aleksandr Revva
- Timur Rodriguez
- Yakov Smirnoff
- Efim Shifrin
- Semyon Slepakov
- Kira Soltanovich
- Pavel Volya
- Vladimir Vinokur
- Ivan Urgant
- Leonid Yarmolnik
- Mikhail Yevdokimov
- Mikhail Zadornov
- Mikhail Zhvanetsky

== Saint Vincent and the Grenadines ==
- Saluche

== Singapore ==
- Fakkah Fuzz
- Jocelyn Chia
- Kumar (Singaporean entertainer)
- Rishi Budhrani
- Sam See
- Umar Rana

== Slovenia ==
- Tin Vodopivec

== South Africa ==
- Alan Committie
- Deep Fried Man
- Loyiso Gola
- Barry Hilton
- Vittorio Leonardi
- Marc Lottering
- Mel Miller
- Riaad Moosa
- Trevor Noah
- Joe Parker
- Pieter-Dirk Uys
- John Vlismas
- Casper de Vries
- Celeste Ntuli
- Mpho Popps

== Spain ==
- Rober Bodegas
- David Broncano
- Andreu Buenafuente
- Chiquito de la Calzada
- Raúl Cimas
- Patricia Conde
- Florentino Fernández
- Ángel Garó
- Miguel Gila
- El Gran Wyoming
- Eva Hache
- Ángel Martín
- Dani Mateo
- Ana Morgade
- Pablo Motos
- Miki Nadal
- Gorka Otxoa
- Paz Padilla
- Pamela Palenciano
- Luis Piedrahita
- Yolanda Ramos
- Joaquín Reyes
- Pedro Reyes
- Berto Romero
- Dani Rovira
- Antonia San Juan
- Santiago Segura
- Ernesto Sevilla
- Roberto Vilar
- Pepe Viyuela

== Sweden ==
- Kodjo Akolor
- David Batra
- Magnus Betnér
- Johannes Brost
- Jonas Gardell
- Johan Glans
- Björn Gustafsson
- Robert Gustafsson
- Michael Halvarson
- Soran Ismail
- Babben Larsson
- Lasse Lindroth
- Fredrik Lindström
- Jesper Odelberg
- Johan Rheborg
- Henrik Schyffert

== Turkey ==
- Beyaz
- Ata Demirer
- Cem Yılmaz
- Doğu Demirkol

== Venezuela ==
- Luis Chataing
- Erika de la Vega
- Laureano Márquez
- Elías Muñoz
- Benjamin Rausseo

== See also ==
- List of comedians
- List of deadpan comedians
