= Gabriël =

Gabriël is the Dutch spelling of Gabriel. People with this name include:

- Gabriël van België (born 2003), Belgian prince
- Gabriël Grupello (1644–1730), Flemish sculptor
- Gabriël van der Hofstadt (1620–1690), Flemish painter
- Gabriël Lomans, Dutch wheel gymnast
- Gabriël Marselis (1609–1673), Dutch merchant and land owner
- Gabriël Metsu (1629–1667), Dutch painter
- Gabriël van der Muyden (c.1500–1560), Flemish jurist and humanist
- Gabriël van Oordt (1757–1836), Dutch theologian
- Gabriël Smit (1910–1981), Dutch poet, essayist, playwright, editor and politician
- Gabriël, one of the pseudonyms used by Dutch novelist Carel van Nievelt (1843–1913)

== See also ==
- Gabriel (disambiguation)
- Gabriëls
