= Patrick Meier =

Patrick Meier may refer to:

- Patrick Meier (figure skater)
- Patrick Meier (humanitarian)

== See also ==
- Patrick Meyer (disambiguation)
- Patrick Meijer, Dutch stand-up comedian
