= Paco Erhard =

- Born: Erhard Hübener; July 16, 1975 (age 51); Munich, Germany

Comedy career
- Years active: 2009–present
- Medium: Stand-up
- Genres: Social satire, political satire, cultural satire, self-deprecation, observational comedy, dark comedy
- Subjects: German culture, global politics, current events
- Website: Official website

Paco Erhard (born Erhard Hübener on July 16, 1975) is a German stand-up comedian, writer, and producer. He is best known for touring the worldwide, English-language comedy festival circuit.

== Early life ==
Erhard was born in Munich, Germany on July 16, 1975. He was named after his great-grandfather Erhard Hübener, who was the first prime minister of Saxony-Anhalt.

== Career ==
=== Comedy ===
Erhard is best known for his first solo show, 5-Step Guide to Being German, which premiered in 2011 at the Edinburgh Festival Fringe. He has also performed a variation of the original called 5-Step Guide to Being German 2.0. Both shows have received critical acclaim, sold out at comedy festivals around the world, and have been named one of the top shows in several festivals. 5-Step Guide to Being German was nominated for a Perth Fringe World Best Comedy Award in 2013. 5-Step Guide to Being German 2.0 won the Pick of the Fringe award in the 2018 Vancouver Fringe Festival. Both versions of the show are still touring.

Erhard has appeared as a cultural commentator on BBC One, SBS, and ABC. He has written about Germany and Europe for the Irish Times. He has worked with cultural organisations such as the Goethe-Institut and the German Chambers of Commerce Abroad.

Erhard's more recent comedy is driven by social commentary on international current affairs. He draws on his experiences as a world traveler. His shows Paco Erhard: Djerman Unchained (2013), Paco Erhard: Worst. German. Ever. (2014), and A (very brief) History of German Humour (2016) are "irreverent, provocative social satire" on topics such as nationalism, racism, homophobia, religion, and terrorism.

After being seen by German comedian and TV host Ingolf Lück at the Edinburgh Festival Fringe in 2012, Erhard started performing in German in addition to English. He has two German-language shows: Paco Erhard: Hard an der Grenze and Paco Erhard: Hallodri für Europa. Erhard has appeared on German television shows StandUpMigranten, NDR Comedy Contest, and Vereinsheim Schwabing. In January 2015, he won the Stuttgart Comedy Clash.

=== Influences and themes ===
Erhard uses stories from his experiences as a world traveler to promote international understanding and communication across cultures. His stand-up routines reference time spent living in America, Italy, Spain, Germany, and the UK, as well as shorter adventures around the world.

Erhard uses recurring themes of German identity and the psychological differences between Germans and other citizens. His comedy traces the historical development of these differences, making light of historical figures such as Tacitus, Frederick the Great, and 19th century German nationalists.

== Personal life ==
=== Travel ===
Erhard is well-traveled and has lived internationally for many years. Inspired by the writings of Jack Kerouac, he hitchhiked out of Germany in 2000, traveling the world and living in Italy, Spain, and the UK. While in Spain, he acquired the nickname "Paco" from a neighbor, which inspired his stage name. Inspired by his work as a comedy MC for British tourists in Tenerife, Erhard moved to London in 2009 to pursue stand-up comedy full-time.

=== Education ===
Erhard studied literature and philosophy in university. His thesis paper on postcolonial literature was awarded the University of Hagen's Award of Excellence in 2009.

== Live shows ==
Show	Premiere	Touring History	Awards
5-Step Guide to Being German	2011	Edinburgh Festival Fringe, Brighton Fringe, Adelaide Fringe Festival, Melbourne International Comedy Festival, Perth Fringe World, Midlandia (Perth Fringe World), Winnipeg Fringe Theatre Festival, Edmonton International Fringe Festival, Sydney Comedy Festival, Calgary Fringe Festival, Vancouver Fringe Festival, Victoria Fringe Theatre Festival	2013: Nominated Perth Fringe World Best Comedy Award
5-Step Guide to Being German 2.0	2012	Edinburgh Festival Fringe, Brighton Fringe, Leicester Square Theatre, Adelaide Fringe Festival, Melbourne International Comedy Festival, Perth Fringe World, Winnipeg Fringe Theatre Festival, Edmonton International Fringe Festival, Calgary Fringe Festival, Vancouver Fringe Festival	2018: Pick of the Fringe; Vancouver Fringe Festival
Paco Erhard: Ex-German	2013	Perth Fringe World, Adelaide Fringe Festival, Melbourne International Comedy Festival, Sydney Comedy Festival	
Paco Erhard: Djerman Unchained	2013	Edinburgh Festival Fringe, Adelaide Fringe Festival, Perth Fringe World	
Paco Erhard: Worst. German. Ever.	2014	Oxford Fringe, Leicester Square Theatre, Edinburgh Festival Fringe, Perth Fringe World, Midlandia (Perth Fringe World), Adelaide Fringe Festival, Melbourne International Comedy Festival, New Zealand International Comedy Festival, Winnipeg Fringe Theatre Festival	
Hard an der Grenze	2015	Bar jeder Vernunft	
A (very brief) History of German Humour	2016	Perth Fringe World, Melbourne International Comedy	
