= Mel Miller (comedian) =

South African comedian

- Born: 14 October 1943 (age 83)
- Notable work: Biltong and Potroast (1976); Joe Parker's Comedy Express

Comedy career
- Medium: Stand–Up; Television
- Subjects: Folk; Politics; Everyday life
- Website: www.comedycv.co.uk/melmiller/

Mel Miller (born 14 October 1943) is a South African stand-up comedian and celebrity.

With friend Mel Green, Mel Miller began his career in 1963 as the comedy duo Mel and Mel. He also worked as a radio actor on the programmes Jet Jungle, The World of Hammond Innes, Marriage Lines and Squad Cars for Springbok Radio.

With the introduction of television in South Africa in 1976, Miller became famous for his appearance in the comedy Biltong and Potroast. In addition, he has since appeared on The Everywhere Express, Us Animals and Punchline.

In the late 80's, Miller was harassed by the Security Branch of the South African Police for his anti-government sentiment, and afterward withdrew from the limelight until being convinced to return to public performance by Joe Parker in 1990.

Miller appeared as one of the contestant panelists on the SABC2 game show Where Were You?, from August to November, 2008.

== See also ==
- List of stand-up comedians
