= Vlismas =

Vlismas is a surname. Notable people with the surname include:

- Cheyanne Vlismas (born 1995), American mixed martial artist
- John Vlismas (born 1973), South African stand-up comedian, academic and DEI strategist
