= List of programs broadcast by CaribVision =

This is a list of television programmes that are either currently being broadcast or have previously been broadcast on CaribVision through their media centre in Barbados.

== A ==
- Another Accent - journalistic
- Another Flavour - cuisine

== B ==
- Book Talk - talk

== C ==
- Carib Beer Highlights - sports
- Caribbean Cuisine - cuisine
- Caribbean News Review - news and current affairs
- Caribbean Newsline - news and current affairs
- Caribbean Passport - journalistic
- Caribbean Today - news and current affairs
- CaribScope Travel and Leisure - journalistic
- Chat Room - talk

== D ==
- Di Show - entertainment
- Dolor Factor Live (with Delia Dolor) — talk show

== E ==
- E-Zone - entertainment

== F ==
- Faith & Truth - religion

== H ==
- Head On - talk
- Hill & Gully Ride - journalistic
- The Hit List - entertainment

== I ==
- Island Jams - entertainment
- Island Life Destinations - journalistic
- The Investor - talk

== K ==
- KiddieCrew.com - children and educational
- Kid's Club - children and educational

== M ==
- The Molly Show - children and educational

== O ==
- On a Personal Note - talk
- On Stage - entertainment

== P ==
- Paradise Motor Sports - sports
- Pet Playhouse - children and educational
- Pilly Out Front - entertainment
- Primetime Caribbean - news and current affairs
- Profile - talk

== R ==
- Riddim Express - entertainment

== S ==
- Sancoche - cuisine
- Sarge in Charge - drama
- Sports Locker - sports

== T ==
- Talk Caribbean - talk

== V ==
- Vibes Caribbean - journalistic. Produced in Saint Vincent and the Grenadines by Randy Dopwell and others.
- VIP Backstage - entertainment

== W ==
- Westwood Park - drama
- Women West Indies - journalistic

== Y ==
- Yellow Umbrella - children and educational

== See also ==
- CaribVision
