= JEJ =

JEJ may refer to:

- James Earl Jones (1931–2024), American actor
- Johnnie Johnson (RAF officer, born 1915) (1915–2001), English pilot and flying ace
- Jeh Airport, on Ailinglaplap Atoll, Marshall Islands
- Joseph E. Johnston (1807–1891), Confederate general
- Jej Perfekcyjność (d. 2023), Polish queer activist
