= Vittorio Leonardi =

South African comedian and actor (born 1977)

- Born: 2 January 1977 (age 49); Warrenton, Northern Cape, South Africa
- Notable work: Improv Express (2003–2008); Laugh Out Loud (2005); One Way (2006); New York Underground Comedy Festival (2007); Vittorio's Secret (2012)

Comedy career
- Years active: 1999 – present
- Medium: Stand–up television Radio
- Subjects: Geeks; Everyday life Relationships
- Website: vittorio.sharp.fm

Vittorio Leonardi (born 2 January 1977) is a South African comedian and actor. As a comedian, he has performed as a member of Joe Parker's Comedy Express, as well as performing improvisational theatre with Joe Parker's Improv Express, and has appeared on stages in Witbank, Pretoria, Johannesburg, Vereeniging, Bloemfontein, Kimberley, Pietermaritzburg, Durban and Cape Town. In television, he has appeared in the Laugh Out Loud (2005) series as part of the team that pranked South African comedian and show host Jeremy Mansfield, and as a shady gun dealer on the show One Way (2006).

Leonardi appeared in the 2007 New York Underground Comedy Festival.

In 2008, he received nominations in the Acappella Comedy Industry Awards, and received the Trusty Steed Award for the most reliable and dependable comic, and the Scribe Award for fastest turnaround of new material.

In May 2009, he became the head writer for and one of the performers in the political satire show, The Last Say on Sunday, hosted by Darren Maule, and aired on SABC 3.

Also in 2009, he appeared in the Academy Award-nominated science-fiction movie District 9.

In January 2011, he became a script writer for SABC 1's popular celebrity gossip show The Real Goboza Reloaded.

In 2012, Vittorio penned a one man show entitled Vittorio's Secret, which was first performed at the National Arts Festival in Grahamstown. In the same year he was nominated for a Comics Choice Award in the Times Comic Pen Award Category.

== See also ==
- List of stand-up comedians
