= New York Underground Comedy Festival =

The New York Underground Comedy Festival is a comedy festival.

Founded in 2003 with 3 shows in 3 nights at the Laurie Beechman Theatre, the festival has grown to 10 days and 300+ shows making it the largest comedy festival in New York.

The NYUCF has had many notable acts perform in previous festivals, including Freddie Roman, Jim Gaffigan, Judy Gold, Charlie Moreno, Rick Overton, Dom Irrera, Colin Quinn, Bill Burr, Nick DiPaolo, Rob Bartlett, Jim Norton, Rich Vos and Eddie Brill.

The festival has raised over $100,000 for charities.

== South African show 2007 ==
In the spirit of the new age of the internet, Acappella Productions, the New York Underground Comedy Festival promoter of South Africa, launched a revolutionary USA-wide video audition in August 2007, encouraging comics to submit one video with their best stand-up material to be judged by a local panel of experts.

Other comedians on the SA lineup for 2007 are:

- Martin Evans (UK)
- Malcolm Ferreira (RSA)
- Al Prodgers (RSA)
- Melt Sieberhagen (RSA)
- Vittorio Leonardi (RSA)
