= Winston Soso =

Vincentian and Grenadinian singer

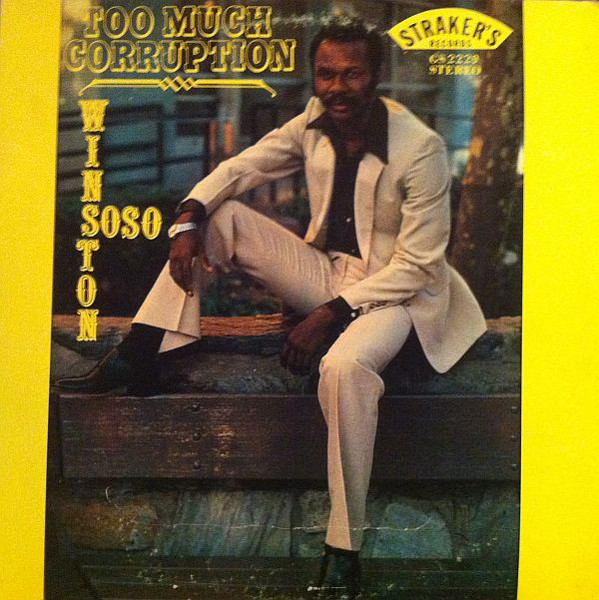
Winston Soso on the cover of Too Much Corruption

Trevor Winston Lockhart (14 July 1952 – 18 July 2021), known professionally as Winston Soso, was a soca singer from Saint Vincent and the Grenadines. He was known among musicians as the "Rolls-Royce of Calypso".

== Biography ==
Trevor Winston Lockhart was born on 14 July 1952. He was raised in Kingstown between Paul's Avenue and Sion Hill. As a child, Lockhart was inspired by the calypso performances during Carnival, especially of Becket and Scorcher. He also became involved in sports, spending five years as goalkeeper for the Saint Vincent and the Grenadines national football team from 1972 through 1976.

Lockhart began performing at the Lyric Theatre in Kingstown in the 1960's under the name "Winston Soso", mainly soul music and R&B. He joined the band Clymax in 1969. In 1996, he became the first Soca Monarch. He was known as the "Rolls-Royce of Calypso"; according to Bernard "Bonni" Browne, the leader of Clymax, Soso received this title from radio host Randy D.

In 2014, Soso was named a cultural ambassador for St. Vincent and the Grenadines. The SVG Diaspora Committee in New York City gave him a Culture Award at their 2017 Diaspora Heritage Awards. He suffered from poor health in later years, with a minor stroke in 2020 and kidney problems.

Soso died on 18 July 2021 at the SUNY Downstate Medical Center in Brooklyn, shortly after his 69th birthday. His family received condolences from fellow artists in Saint Vincent as well as the Trinbago Unified Calypsonians Organisation (TUCO). The Carnival Development Corporation (CDC) posted a tribute to Soso on its Facebook page.

== Discography ==
•. Out on the Edge

- Too Much Corruption
- War on Crime
- Just Soso
