= Deep Fried Man =

South African musical comedian and writer

- Born: Daniel Friedman; 9 January 1981 (age 45); Johannesburg, South Africa
- Other name: Deep Fried Man

Comedy career
- Years active: 2010–present
- Medium: Stand-up, television
- Genres: Satire, parody
- Subjects: South Africa, Sexual intercourse, social media

Daniel Friedman (born 9 January 1981), known on stage as Deep Fried Man, is a South African musical comedian and writer based in Johannesburg. He describes what he does as "stand-up comedy with a guitar". He adopted his stage name, a play on his real name, because "it went along with the kind of musical comedy I wanted to do, which was an unhealthy kind of comedy".

== Early life ==
Friedman is the son of political analyst and newspaper columnist Steven Friedman, and is Jewish.

From 1999 to 2002, he studied journalism, philosophy and drama at Rhodes University, graduating with a Bachelor of Arts degree. He also completed a Postgraduate Certificate in Education (PGCE) at Wits University in 2010.

== Career ==
After university, Friedman worked in journalism and social media.

He performed alternative folk music in Johannesurg prior to becoming a comedian. He made the transition to professional comedy after being declared joint winner of the 2010 Comedy Showdown hosted by Joe Parker, as a result of which he got to perform in the 2010 UN Comedy Show alongside top local and international comedians. He was voted Best Newcomer at the first Annual South African Comic's Choice Awards held at the Teatro, Montecasino, in January 2011.

He has performed in various comedy shows including the Heavyweight Comedy Jam, the Tshwane Comedy Fiesta, UJ Rag's One Night Stand, Loads of Laughs, 46664's It's No Joke, Jew Must Be Joking and Blacks Only. He was the supporting act for Trevor Noah's one-man show Scratch That at The Fringe in the Joburg Theatre Complex in 2010, and has performed in his own one-man shows Deeply Fried in 2011, and the more satirical White Whine in 2012. His debut one-man show Deeply Fried won a Standard Bank Ovation Award at the 2011 National Arts Festival in Grahamstown.

He has appeared in various television shows including Mzansi Magic's Laugh Out Loud and Opening Guys, M-Net's Tonight With Trevor Noah, SABC 2's Morning Live, SABC 3's Last Say on Sunday and eNCA's weekly satirical news show Late Nite News with Loyiso Gola. He also played a cameo role in the 2012 South African comedy drama film Material.

The BCCSA dismissed two complaints regarding a satirical song he performed about white South Africans which was aired on DStv's Comedy Central channel in 2011.

He maintains a strong presence on social networking sites Facebook, Twitter and YouTube. In 2010 Memeburn included him on a list of 10 South African comedians using the Facebook platform to market themselves, which noted he "makes the most of his Facebook audience, updating frequently with songs, events, jokes, and photos" and is a "great example of how to use Facebook".

In 2012 he was named one of Mail & Guardian's 200 Young South Africans, in the Arts & Culture category.

He also writes for the Daily Maverick and Memeburn.

In 2020 old tweets made by Friedman which had previously resulted in a feud arising with Willem Petzer and complaints being laid against Friedman resurfaced bringing fresh life to the feud with Petzer, resulting in new complaints being laid with The Citizen. Friedman was suspended from his position as online editor while an internal investigation was conducted, in February 2020 the investigation was concluded and Friedman was found guilty of bringing The Citizen into ill repute and was dismissed from his position as online news editor.

== Awards ==
- 2010 Nando's Jozi Comedy Festival's Comedy Showdown – joint winner with Dillan Oliphant
- 2011 Annual South African Comic's Choice Awards – Best Newcomer
- 2011 Standard Bank Ovation Award
