= Omar 'The White Sudani' Ramzi =

Sudanese stand-up comedian

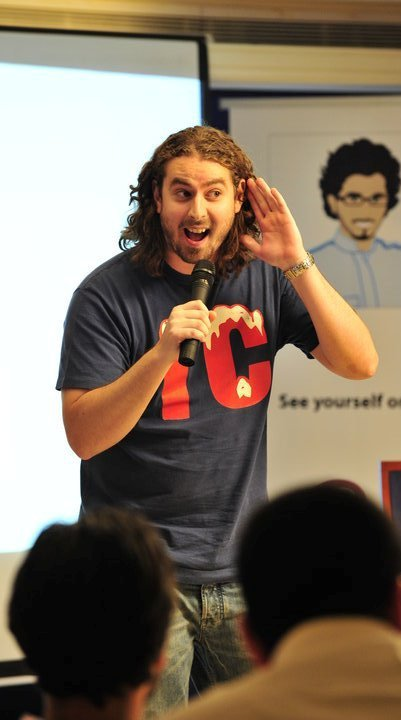
- Performing in Jeddah, Saudi Arabia
- Born: June 5, 1983 (age 43); Jeddah, Saudi Arabia

Comedy career
- Years active: 2009–present
- Medium: Stand-up
- Genres: Satire, improvisational comedy, mimicry, impersonations, observational comedy, theatrical comedy

Omar Ramzi (Arabic: عمر رمزي; born June 5, 1983) is the first white Sudanese stand-up comedian and one of the first stand-up comedians to perform on stage professionally in Saudi Arabia and has opened for a number of accomplished stand-up comedians from the US and the UK.

== Bio and career ==
Omar Ramzi was born and raised in Jeddah, Saudi Arabia. His mother is Irish and his father is Sudanese and he is known in the comedy world as 'The White Sudani' (Sudani is Sudanese in Arabic) His debut as a stand-up comedian was in February, 2009, opening for Ahmed Ahmed in Jeddah, Saudi Arabia along with a few other local comedians for Smile Productions.

Since then he has been doing shows in all the major cities in Saudi Arabia and Egypt: Jeddah, Riyadh, Khobar, Cairo and Alexandria He has opened for several other world-renowned stand-up comedians such as Ahmed Ahmed, Maz Jobrani, Angelo Tsarouchas, Dean Edwards, Jeff Mirza and Erik Griffin. He has performed at shows hosted by Smile Productions, Luxury Events, Rehman and Friends, Century Events and Al Hezb el Comedy.

== Appearances and video footage ==
He performed and was interviewed on the Saudi 2 Channel show 'A day in the life of' A day in the life of and he has acted in the music video 'Never Too Late' by Prince Faisal Al-Saud Never too late Which aired on MTV Arabia He has posted a selection of videos of his performances and other comical material on his YouTube Channel Omar Ramzi - YouTube

He was featured in a story by CNN 'Egypt's First Comedy Factory' with Al Hezb El Comedy Middle Eastern youth find comic relief through stand-up

More recently he was one of the finalists of the KitKat comedy break show. A reality-TV style show that was based in Dubai, UAE. KitKatArabia - YouTube

== Other interests ==
He also has a passion for Music Production and has produced many songs of all different types of genres from rock to hiphop Omar 'Omz' Ramzi

== See also ==
- List of stand-up comedians in the Arab World
