= List of deadpan comedians =

This is a list of notable deadpan comedians and actors who have used deadpan as a part of their repertoire. Deadpan describes the act of deliberately displaying a lack of or no emotion, commonly as a form of comedic delivery to contrast with the ridiculousness of the subject matter. The delivery is meant to be blunt, sarcastic, laconic, or apparently unintentional.

== List of deadpan comedians ==
Comedians and actors who have used deadpan as a part of their repertoire include:

- Eve Arden
- Fred Armisen
- Bea Arthur
- Rowan Atkinson
- Dan Aykroyd
- Richard Ayoade
- Todd Barry
- Jason Bateman
- Stephanie Beatriz
- H. Jon Benjamin
- Jack Benny
- Jo Brand
- Steve Carell
- Jimmy Carr
- Michael Cera
- Chevy Chase
- Ronny Chieng
- John Cleese
- Stephen Colbert
- Tim Conway
- Jane Curtin
- Andy Daly
- Larry David
- Jack Dee
- Nathan Fielder
- Jim Gaffigan
- Zach Galifianakis
- Dave Gorman
- Jack Handey
- Steve Harvey
- Mitch Hedberg
- Tim Heidecker
- Dave Hughes
- Jeffrey Jones
- Milton Jones
- Jonathan Katz
- Buster Keaton
- Craig Kilborn
- Stewart Lee
- Jack Levi
- Sean Lock
- Norm Macdonald
- Lee Mack
- Demetri Martin
- Paul Merton
- Sarah Millican
- Dan Mintz
- Eugene Mirman
- Shazia Mirza
- Diane Morgan
- Chris Morris
- Bill Murray
- Kumail Nanjiani
- Bob Newhart
- Leslie Nielsen
- Tig Notaro
- Virginia O'Brien
- Nick Offerman
- Pat Paulsen
- Karl Pilkington
- Aubrey Plaza
- Romesh Ranganathan
- Peter Sellers
- Sarah Silverman
- Ben Stein
- Jon Stewart
- Christopher Walken
- Eric Wareheim
- Kristen Wiig
- Steven Wright

== See also ==
- List of comedians
- Lists of comedians
- List of stand-up comedians
