= Conrad Koch =

South African comedian and ventriloquist

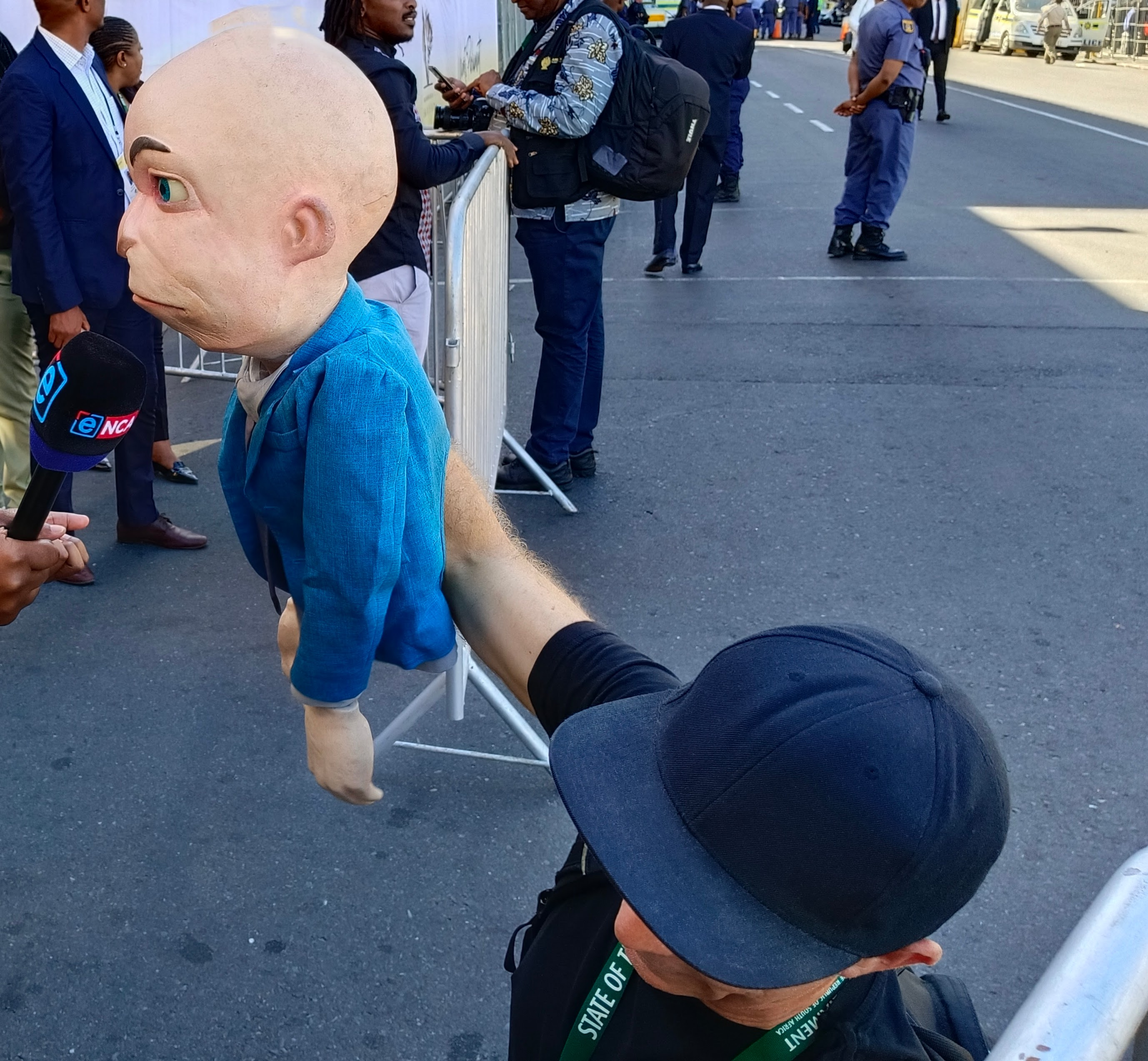
- Conrad Koch (bottom right) and his puppet, Chester Missing (top left) who is being interviewed by an eNCA reporter at the State of the Nation (SONA) 2024 in Cape Town, South Africa.
- Education: University of Cape Town

Comedy career
- Medium: Stand-up; Television
- Genres: Stand-up comedy; observational comedy; prop comedy
- Website: conradkoch.co.za

Conrad Koch is a South African comedian and ventriloquist best known for his character Chester Missing, a fictional political commentator who confronts racism and white privilege in post-apartheid South Africa.

Koch and Missing gained fame through their performances on the television programme Late Nite News with Loyiso Gola between 2010 and 2015, where Missing satirised the Jacob Zuma administration as well as opposition politicians and became best known for interviewing politicians in a humorous style. Missing then became prominent as a way for Koch to examine the effects of apartheid and racism in South Africa as well as to address white privilege and systemic racism that he and others benefit from. Originally, Missing was designed to appear like a black person, but controversies over Koch, a white person, using a black character and accent led to the puppet being changed to have white "skin" and blue eyes.

In 2014, Koch criticised singer Steve Hofmeyr using Missing for having made various racist statements, in particular by claiming black South Africans were the "architects of Apartheid", and called for companies to boycott his performances. In response, Hofmeyer sued Koch and asked for a protective order, which was denied.

After being disrupted by the effects of the COVID-19 pandemic in South Africa, Koch returned to touring with the show Ramapuppet (a blend of Ramaphosa and puppet) in 2022, where Missing was joined by other puppet characters. This show focused less on political satire and more on the daily lives and experiences of South Africans during the pandemic.

Koch reportedly holds a master's degree in social anthropology from the University of Cape Town.
