= Late Nite News with Loyiso Gola =

South African satirical news TV series

- Genre: Comedy, news satire
- Created by: Loyiso Gola; Kagiso Lediga; Tamsin Andersson
- Directed by: Kagiso Lediga; Andrew Wessels
- Presented by: Loyiso Gola
- Starring: David Kibuuka; Conrad Koch; Daniel Friedman; Tats Nkonzo; Tol A$$ Mo; Ntosh Madlingozi
- Country of origin: South Africa
- Original language: English
- No. of seasons: 11 (as of 2014)

Production
- Executive producers: Tamsin Andersson; Kagiso Lediga; Loyiso Gola; Andrew Wessels
- Producer: Tamsin Andersson
- Production location: Johannesburg
- Cinematography: Boitomelo Moroka
- Editors: David Rypstra; Marc De Montbron
- Running time: 23 minutes
- Production company: Diprente

Original release
- Network: e.tv eNCA
- Release: 29 September 2010 – April 2015

Late Nite News with Loyiso Gola (Late Nite News or LNN) is a South African late-night satirical news television series that aired weekly on e.tv and eNCA from September 2010 to April 2015. The show, featuring a variety of local stand-up comedians, was created by comedians Loyiso Gola and Kagiso Lediga, and Producer Tamsin Andersson. It was launched in 2010. It is a collaboration between private broadcaster eNCA and production company Diprente.

== Format, cast and crew ==
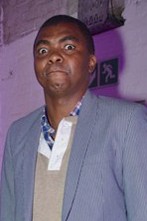
Gola in 2011

LNN is anchored by Gola, who was born in the Cape Town township of Gugulethu in 1983, and directed by Kagiso Lediga, who was born in the Pretoria township of Atteridgeville in 1978. The show is produced by Tamsin Andersson. Regulars appearing on the show include Ugandan-born comedian David Kibuuka in the role of foreign correspondent, and political commentator Chester Missing, who is a puppet handled by ventriloquist Conrad Koch. Musical comedian Deep Fried Man collaborates with guest artists performing the "Morale Index", a musical version of the high and low points of the week's news. Comical headlines appear on a scrolling news ticker during the show.

LNN predominantly provides humorous commentary by young black South African comedians on the lack of progress in the country despite the anti-apartheid struggle. The LNN team consider themselves to be politically objective; their motto is to "speak truth to power and make fun of everyone equally". Gola told the Daily Sun that the show reflects his views on current issues. He said he wanted to encourage people to take an interest in politics and question the status quo. In an interview for the Daily Maverick, Gola said: "We as a country have to think of our own creative ways to get out of the situation we're in." Men's Health describes Gola as "a genuine thinker masquerading as a fool and the reluctant voice of a cynical generation". Gola and Kibuuka have publicly thanked President Jacob Zuma and former African National Congress Youth League president Julius Malema for supplying them with comedy material.

== Reception ==
LNN has been compared to The Daily Show with Jon Stewart by the local and international media. Commenting on the comparison, local comedian Riaad Moosa says about Gola's performance: "There's a young hipness to the way he does it; Jon Stewart is more of a comedic newsman. Loyiso is a bit more flippant." LNN was nominated for an International Emmy Award for best comedy series in 2013, and again in 2014.

In September 2015, it was announced that the show had been cancelled by eNCA, with a plan to use a different format going forward.

== Awards ==
- 2013- Nominated for International Emmy Award, Best Comedy
- 2014- Nominated for International Emmy Award, Best Comedy
- 2014 – South African Film and Television Awards – Best Ensemble in a TV Comedy
