= François Baudouin =

French jurist, Christian controversialist and historian (1520–1573)

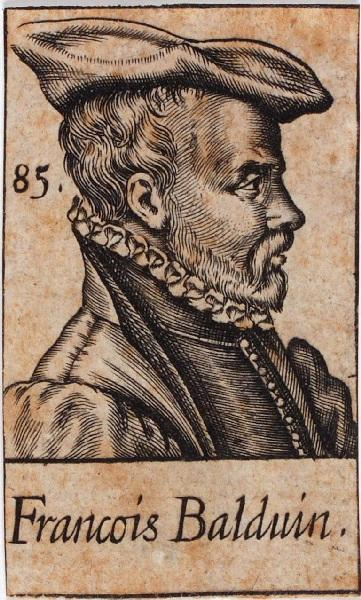
Portrait of François Baudouin, engraving by Léonard Gaultier

François Baudouin (1520 – 24 October 1573), also called Balduinus, was a French jurist, Christian controversialist and historian. Among the most colourful of the noted French humanists, he was respected by his contemporaries as a statesman and jurist, even as they frowned upon his perceived inconstancy in matters of faith: he was noted as a Calvinist who converted to Catholicism.

== Life ==
He was born in Arras, Habsburg Netherlands, in the Holy Roman Empire, and educated in the convent school at St. Vaast. Baudouin studied law in the University of Leuven with Mudaeus. He settled as an advocate in Arras, where he continued his studies, but was banned from the town in 1545 on charges of heresy due to his Calvinist leanings. He went to the court of the Emperor Charles V at Brussels, and then travelled extensively.

After brief stays in Paris, Strasbourg and Geneva – where he served as John Calvin's secretary, though he later became his enemy – he settled in 1549 in Bourges as a doctor and then professor of law, as a colleague of Baro and Duarenus. Rivalries with the latter led him to move to Strasbourg and, 1555, to Heidelberg, where his academic career reached its apogee.

Leaving his chair to engage in European confessional politics, Baudouin was unsuccessful in assisting with attempts to reconcile the Roman Catholic Church and the Reformation, for instance in the failed Colloquy at Poissy, and in mediation efforts in the Netherlands. In 1563, he re-converted to Catholicism and in 1569, he was called again to teach law at Angers. Before he could accompany his patron, Henry of Anjou – now King of Poland – to Kraków, he died 1573 in Paris of a fever.

== Writings ==
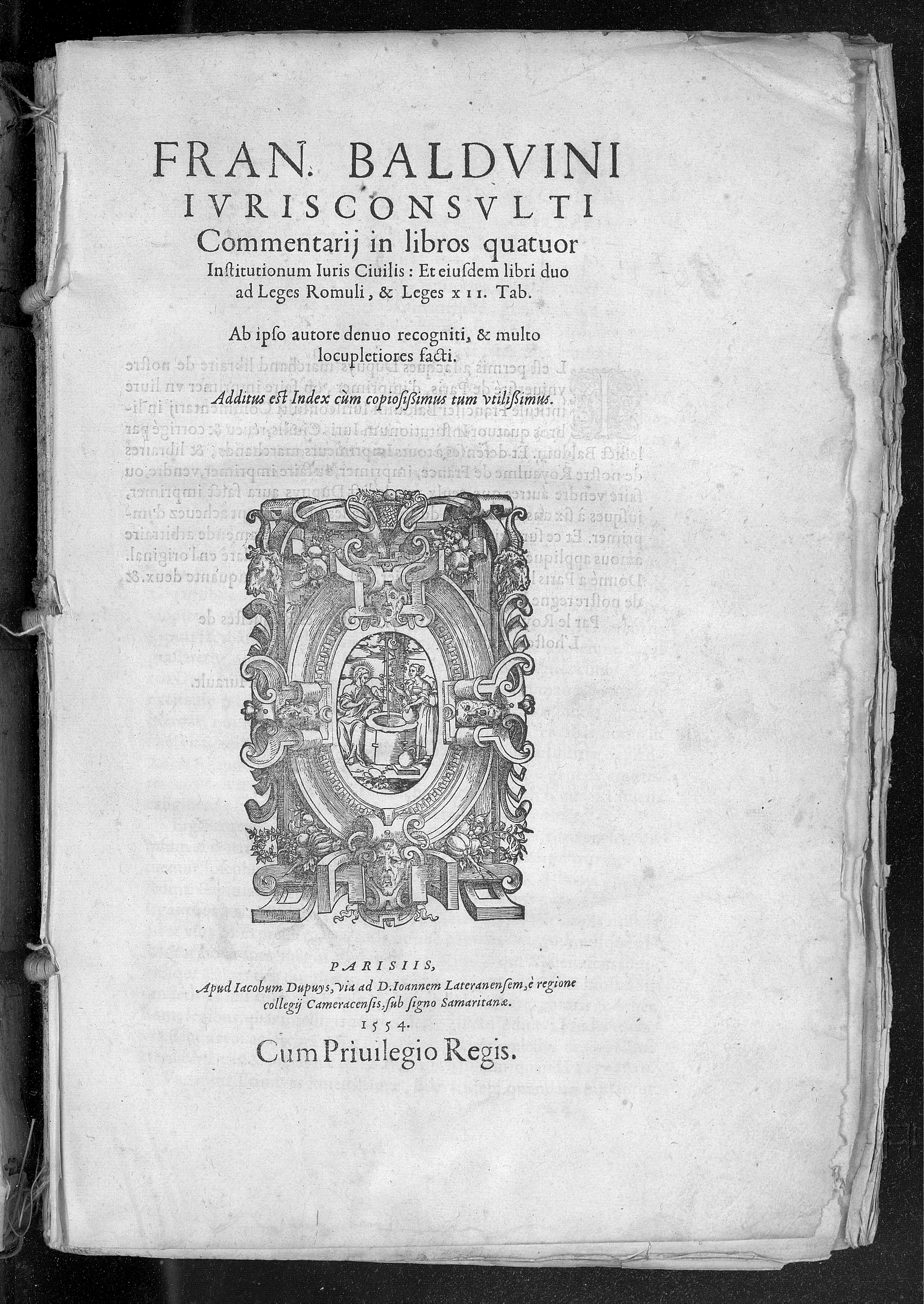
Commentarii in libros quatuor Institutionum Iuris Civilis, 1554

Baudouin was a prolific writer on juridical and ecclesiastical topics. As a jurist, he established the palingenetic method of presentation of legal sources. His works include many substantial commentaries on Roman law. He was the first to reconstruct the original legislation of Justinian and to authenticate a text (the ‘Octavius’) of the early Christian writer Minucius Felix (200-400). Baudouin had produced a monograph on the Emperor Constantine in 1556.

He wrote a study of a major dispute between Catholics and Donatists (and the Emperor Constantine's first large-scale dealing with the Christian church), the episcopal election of Carthage in 313.

=== Selected bibliography ===
- Justiniani Leges De re rustica (1542)
- Justiniani Institutionem seu Elementorum libri quattuor (1545)
- Juris civilis Schola Argentinensis (1555), a teaching program for jurists
- Constantinus Magnus, seu de constantini imperatoris legibus ecclesiasticis atque civilibus (1556/1612), a commentary on Constantine's fragments from the Codex Justinianus
- Commentarius ad edicta veterum principium Romanorum de christianis (1557)
- Iustinianus, siue, De iure nouo commentariorum libri IIII. (1560)
- Minucii Felicis Octavius restitutus a Fr. Balduino (1560), as editor
- De Institutionae historiae universae: libri II: et ejus cum jurisprudencia conjunctione (1561)
- Fr. Balduini Responsio altera ad Ioan. Calvinum (1562)
- S. Optati libri sex de schismate donatistarum, cum Fr. Balduini praefatione (1563), as editor
- Discours sur le fait de la Réformation (1564)
- Historia Carthaginiensis collationis inter catholicos et donatistas, ex rerum ecclesiasticarum commentaries Fr. Balduini (1566). Parisiis [Paris], Apud Claudium Fremy 1566. First edition. 8vo., fols. [xvi] 100.
- Delibatio Africanae historiae, seu Optati libri VI, de schismate donatistarum et Victoris Uticensis libri III de persecutione Vandalorum cum Fr. Balduini annotationibus (1569), as editor
- Francisci Balduini ... opuscula varia / collecta, et denuo ed. a Goswino Josepho de Buininck. - Dusseldorpii : Stahl, 1765. digital
