= Gabriëls =

Gabriëls or Gabriels is a surname. Notable people with the surname include:

- Bert Gabriëls (born 1972), Belgian comedian
- Geert Gabriëls (born 1979), Dutch politician
- Henry Gabriels (1838–1921), American Roman Catholic bishop
- Jaak Gabriëls (1943–2024), Belgian politician
- Jan-Willem Gabriëls (born 1979), Dutch rower

== Other uses ==
- Gabriels (band), English-American three-piece band
