= Patrick Mayer =

Patrick Mayer may refer to:

- Patrick Mayer (Austrian footballer) (born 1986)
- Patrick Mayer (German footballer) (born 1988)
- Pat Mayer (born 1961), ice hockey player

== See also ==
- Patrick Meyer (disambiguation)
