= John Vlismas =

South African comedian

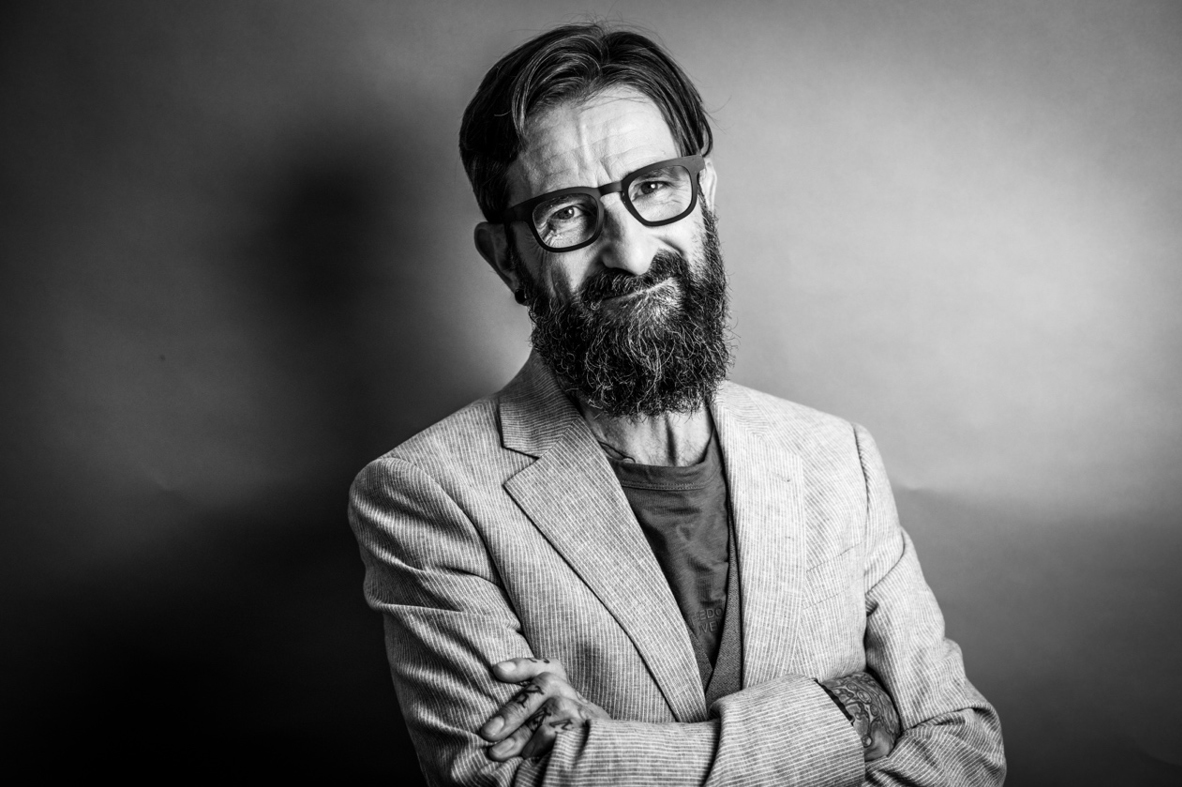
- Vlismas in 2026
- Born: 3 May 1973 (age 53); Marondera, Zimbabwe
- Education: Henley Business School Africa
- Notable work: How to manage the workplace diversity dilemma - a Henley White Paper

Comedy career
- Medium: Stand-Up Research Class Room Board Room
- Genres: Diversity, Equity and Inclusion
- Subjects: Politics; Everyday life
- Website: www.ogocreative.co.za

John Vlismas (born 3 May 1973) is a South African stand-up comedian, academic and DEI strategist.

== Comedy career ==
Vlismas won the 2007 South African Comedy Award for best stand-up comedian of the year and was a finalist in the 2008 Yuk Yuk's Great Canadian Laugh Off.

In 2010, Vlismas appeared in the comedy film Outrageous alongside fellow South African comedians Barry Hilton, Joey Rasdien, Loyiso Gola, Mark Banks, Riaad Moosa and Krijay Govender.

In April 2014, Vlismas was part of the panel for Comedy Central Africa's Roast of Kenny Kunene and Steve Hofmeyr.

He has also appeared in several Comedy Central productions, including solo specials and additional Comedy Central Roast programmes.

Vlismas has performed internationally at venues including the Royal Albert Hall in London, the Sydney Modern Art Museum and the Tempodrome in Berlin.

He was appointed as a 46664 Ambassador for the Nelson Mandela Foundation.

== Academic and business career ==
Vlismas was awarded a scholarship at Henley Business School Africa, where he completed an MBA.

During his MBA studies, he received distinctions in Strategic Marketing and Relationship Marketing.

He works in the field of diversity, equity and inclusion (DEI), leadership, culture and community building through his business, OGO Creative, where he serves as co-founder and Head of Strategy.

Vlismas has collaborated with Henley Business School in the co-design and facilitation of course material and contributed to the transition of marketing and learning activities to virtual delivery during the COVID-19 pandemic.

In 2023, he co-authored a white paper with Henley Business School on workplace diversity.

In 2024, he presented a work titled Player Zero at LeaderEx and at academic and industry conferences.

== See also ==
- List of stand-up comedians
