= Barry Hilton =

South African stand-up comedian (born 1956)

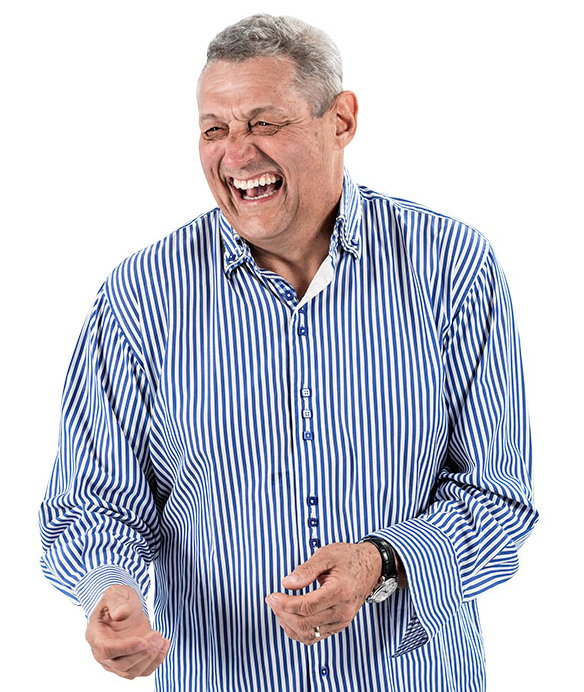
- Barry Hilton
- Born: David Barry Hilton; 29 January 1956 (age 70); Salisbury, Rhodesia
- Other name: The Cousin
- Spouse(s): JMS McKirdy 1972–1980; JB Tweedie 1980–2006; Sandra Hilton 2007 – present

Comedy career
- Years active: 1983–present
- Medium: Stand-up; Film
- Genres: Observational comedy Satire; Physical comedy
- Website: www.barryhilton.com

David Barry Hilton (born 29 January 1956) is a South African stand-up comedian. Referred to by his middle name, Barry (aka 'The Cousin'), he is also an actor, television personality and motivational speaker. After 6 years of initially working as an electrician he tried his hand at comedy – turning Professional in 1983 at the age of 26. Inspired by comedians Richard Pryor and Billy Connolly, Hilton's personal style can best be described as a combination of observational, satirical and physical comedy.

== Early life and education ==
Hilton was born in 1956 to Irene Natalie Lieveaux, a French Mauritian descendant and Lancashire-born father Jack Hilton. In 1961 Hilton's family moved from Southern Rhodesia to North Wales where he attended St Joseph's Roman Catholic Junior School from the age of 5 (1961) to the age of 10 (1966). Ages 11 to 12 were spent at Blessed Edward Jones Catholic High School in Rhyl until the family relocated to Newlands in Cape Town, South Africa where his father worked as a bricklayer. From March 1969 to December 1971 Hilton was a pupil at Observatory Boys (now Rhodes High School) but left at age 15 to start an apprenticeship at Joffe Electrical, which he completed in 1974.

== Early career ==
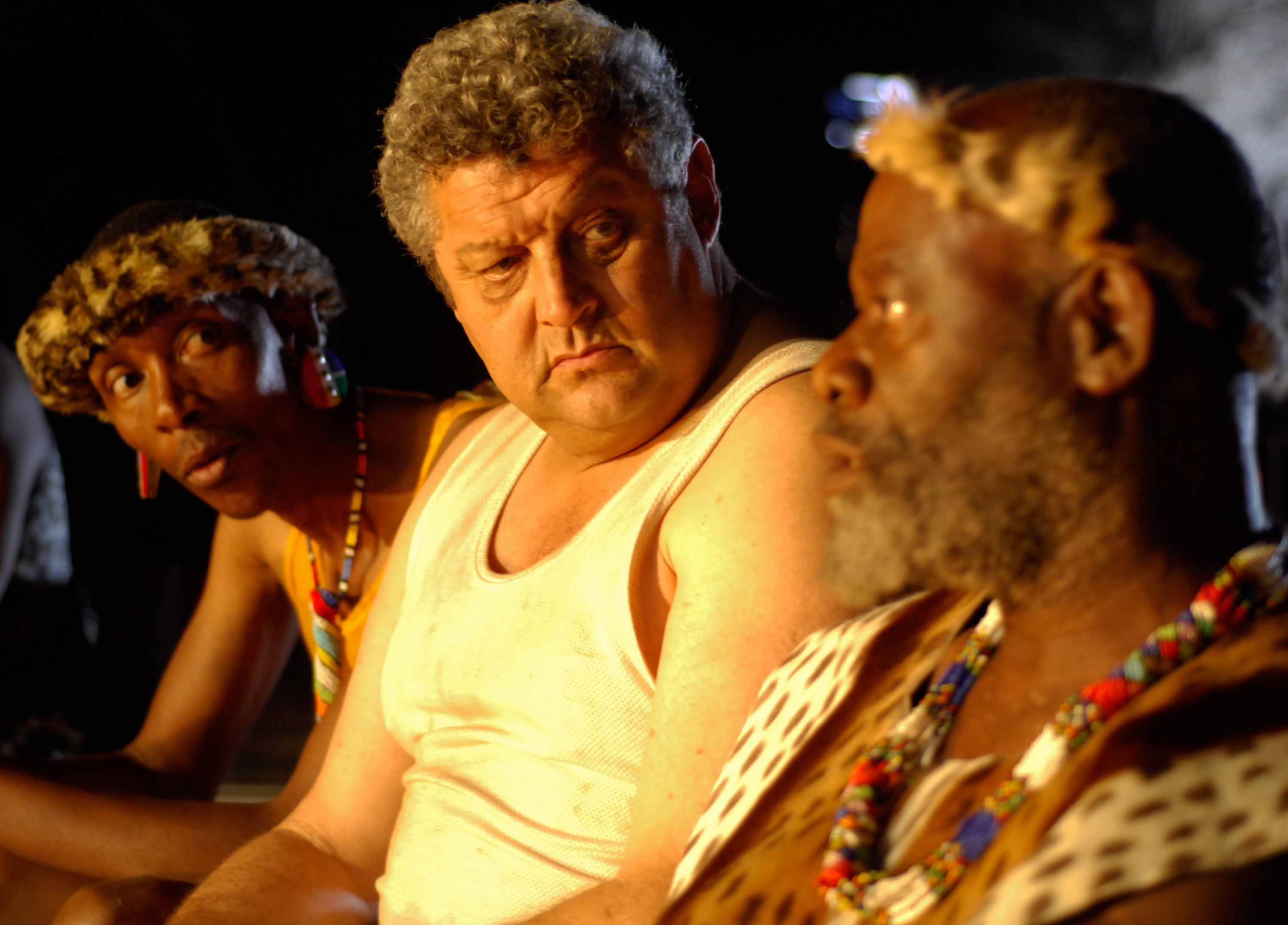
Hilton in 'Finding Lenny'

Whilst working as the maintenance manager of a hotel frequented by the cast of the comedy television show 'Biltong and Potroast' Hilton met Johnny Noble who managed to get him into his first gig at The Holiday Inn, in Port Elizabeth in May 1983. This was followed by a six-month stint as compere at cabaret spot, the Millionaires Club in Cape Town after which he relocated to Johannesburg to perform at local pub, The Jolly Roger. It was here where agent Josie Broude (of the "Don Hughes Organisation") run by Maurice Fresco discovered Hilton and represented him for 10 years up until her death in 1994. Performances at the Runway Bar, Royal Swazi Sun and Wild Coast Sun followed, making Hilton the first South African comedian ever to perform at the latter. Hilton is also the first South African comedian ever to perform at the Sun City Extravaganza. There he shared the stage with eccentric French actress/dancer/singer Jacqueline Du Gay from Las Vegas whilst continuing to perform as a relatively unknown comic at the Sun City Super Bowl in 'Laugh Aid' 1989. Due to his mother's illness with cancer, Hilton returned to South Africa from a four night gig called 'In on the park' at St Helier on the Channel Islands Jersey where he opened for Billy Connolly. In 1990 he moved back to South Africa permanently, returning to the Runway Bar for four years to continue his work in a new Connolly inspired direction. Here Joe Parker advised him to book sets and take money from the door rather than working for guaranteed money gigs. Basil O'Hagen gave Hilton the opportunity to do so at Dan Keld West, and after having performed for only six people on the first night, gigs picked up steadily and Hilton's career in comedy started to look promising. To date Hilton has opened for comic greats such as Bob Monkhouse, Bobby Davro, Billy Connolly and Les Dennis and is also the first South African to perform at London's Comedy Store. To this day Hilton continues to fill 4000 seat – and more – theaters with his solo shows.

== 2001 – present ==
=== Television ===
Besides comedy, Hilton has also contributed to television by hosting talk shows Catch A Wake Up and Funny You Should Say That and TV game show The Generation Game in 2008. More recently Hilton guested on TV game show I Love South Africa. He has also guested numerous times on The Expresso Show.

2015 saw Hilton perform a comedy special, titled The Live Series – Barry Hilton. Developed especially for DStv's Box Office by Mannequin Pictures and launched on Box Office and released later in 2015 on DVD. DStv says sales from show "exceeded expectations", it was one of the best-selling shows on Box Office when it was released in February 2015, selling more rentals than some well-known Hollywood feature films. Also in 2015, he appeared in an M-NET documentary series titled, My Story. He appeared in Episode 4.

=== Commercials ===
Hilton was the Savanna Cider brand face from 1999 to 2011. He reprised his role as Larry the Bartender for thirteen commercials in those 12 years. Since 2011 Hilton has featured in fourteen commercials in an ongoing campaign for newly re-launched fast food outlet, Romans Pizza. The "Schoolkids" ad was placed ninth in the Millward Browns 2012 Best Liked South African adverts. Between 2012 and 2013 Hilton featured in radio voiceover and print adverts for the Chevrolet Campaign 2014 and three television commercials for Lasher Tools.

=== Movies ===
Barry Hilton LIVE

At the Feel Good Film Festival in Hollywood, Hilton was nominated for best actor in a lead role for 'Finding Lenny' which also ended up winning best narrative feature in the Pan African Film Festival in Cannes. In 2010 he starred in a South African stand-up comedy feature film titled 'Outrageous' with fellow comedians John Vlismas and Mark Banks. Barry hosted and performed an episode for Comedy Central Africa in June 2012 filmed at Parkers Comedy and Jive and was shortlisted, alongside John Cleese, for Best Comedy Act Dubai TimeOut Night Life Awards in 2013. Hilton has over seven signature comedy DVDs attributed to his name and celebrated 30 years in comedy in 2012.

=== Live shows ===
September 2013 Hilton was the first South African comedian to be invited to perform at The Improv at Harrah's in Las Vegas. Hilton also performed MC duties for the famous South African singer, Steve Hofmeyr in January 2014. In February Jami Gong from Take Out Comedy Club invited Hilton back to perform his new show, The Way I see It in Hong Kong and Vietnam. Hilton was invited to attend and perform at the Top Gear Festival in Durban, South Africa in June. After a tour of the UK in June, Hilton returned to Hong Kong as one of the headlining acts at the 8th International Comedy Festival in September 2014 with shows in Hong Kong, Singapore and Macau. He followed this up with performances in Australia and New Zealand. Hilton's audio track of his famous joke, "Nou Gaan Ons Braai" was used on the "Lag n Slag" CD. The CD is a compilation of South African jokes and short stories told by their often famous creators. Other artists featured on the CD are Tolla van der Merwe, Leon Schuster, Nico Nel, Nataniël and Kobus Galloway to name a few. The CD was released for sale in July 2014. In 2012 Hilton launched an online store dedicated to the sale of Braai merchandise. His Nou Gaan Ons Braai clip on YouTube has received over 600 000 views. A solo performance for 4 000 people at Carnival City in Johannesburg in 2015 saw Hilton completely surrounded by the audience on a center stage, a first for South African Comedy. Hilton was the only South African comic to perform at the 2015 KLICFEST in Kuala Lumpur. In January 2016 Hilton performed in Australia at The Sydney Opera House, Perth Convention Centre and Brisbane Convention Centre.

== Awards ==
In June 2013 he was invited back to Live at Parkers and again filmed for Comedy Central with the top rated headlining acts from the past season. In July Hilton received the Comics Choice Lifetime Achiever Award. Winners of the prestigious awards are voted by fellow artists and receive a "Waldo" statuette of which only 6 are made each year, however only the "Lifetime Achiever" recipient receives the ring called the "Charles" named after Charlie Chaplin and are 'honoured' at a special grilling at Parker's a few weeks before the formal awards ceremony. Zimbabwean born Hilton qualified for a nomination in 2014's Zim awards for the Personality of the year award. Other nominees included John Vlismas, Getmore Sithole, Melgin Tafirenyika and Leroy Gopal. Hilton won, and was at the prestigious ceremony in Johannesburg to collect his award. In 2015 The Rotary Foundation of Rotary International named Hilton a Paul Harris Fellow in appreciation for assisting in the better understanding and friendly relations among peoples of the world.

== Personal life ==
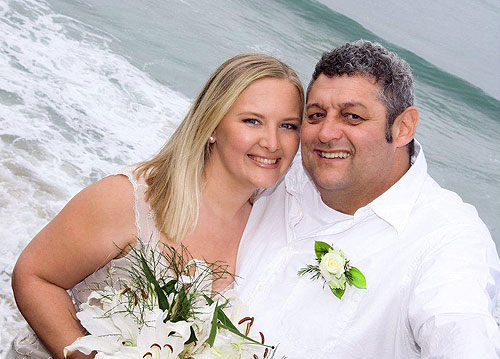
Hilton and wife, Sandy Hilton

Having six children of his own, Hilton is an avid supporter of the "Little Fighter's Cancer Trust" and continually takes part in charity events to raise money and awareness for the West Rand Heart and Organ Transplant Foundation. Hilton is married to his third wife Sandy Hilton (2007–current) after two previous marriages to Janet McKirdy (1976–1980) and Jane Tweedie (1980–2004). He presently resides in Hermanus, South Africa with his wife and children.

Toured Shows	Year	Note
Evolver	2016	Wild Coast Sun
Evolver	2016	Sibaya
Evolver	2016	Zimbabwe
Live in Australia	2016	Sydney Opera House, Perth Convention Centre and Brisbane Convention Centre Sydney
Barry Hilton LIVE	2015	Rockwell Theatre
Barry Hilton LIVE	2015	The Ridge Casino Witbank
Barry Hilton LIVE	2015	Kuala Lumpur Comedy Festival Kuala Lumpur
Barry Hilton LIVE	2015	Emnotweni
Barry Hilton LIVE	2015	Silverstar Casino
Barry Hilton LIVE	2015	Golden Horse
Barry Hilton LIVE	2015	Lyric Theatre
Barry Hilton LIVE	2015	Charity, The Guild Theatre Charity
Barry Hilton LIVE	2015	Singapore
Barry Hilton LIVE	2015	Carnival City
The Way I See It	2014	Secunda Graceland Arena
The Way I See It	2014	Cruiseliner MS Volendam
The Way I See It	2014	Pretoria Atterbury Theatre
The Way I See It	2014	Centurion Theatre
The Way I See It	2014	Mauritius Le Suffren Hotel
The Way I See It	2014	Pietermaritzburg Golden Horse Casino
The Way I See It	2014	Johannesburg Silverstar Casino
The Way I See It	2014	United Kingdom tour
The Way I See It	2014	Cape Town All Star Theatre
The Way I See It	2014	Singapore The Vault
The Way I See It	2014	Hong Kong Comedy Festival
The Way I See It	2014	Australia New Zealand Tour
The Way I See It	2014	Cruiseliner Pacific Pearl
The Way I See It	2014	Zimbabwe The Glasshouse
The Way I See It	2014	Doha The Golf Club
The Way I See It	2014	Pretoria Atterbury Theatre
The Way I See It	2014	Johannesburg Lyric Theatre
Best of Everything Ever	2013	Macau Comedy Masala
Best of Everything Ever	2013	Singapore Mink Bar
Best of Everything Ever	2013	Hong Kong Take Out Comedy Club
Best of Everything Ever	2013	Macau Lions Bar
Best of Everything Ever	2013	Johannesburg Sun City
Best of Everything Ever	2013	Dubai Madinat Theatre
Best of Everything Ever	2013	Cruiseliner SEA PRINCESS
Best of Everything Ever	2013	Cruiseliner SUN PRINCESS
Best of Everything Ever	2013	Cruiseliner DAWN PRINCESS
Best of Everything Ever	2013	Cape Town Baxter Theatre
Best of Everything Ever	2013	Durban Sibaya
Best of Everything Ever	2013	Live studio audience at Parkers Comedy Club for Comedy Central
Best of Everything Ever	2013	Las Vegas Hurrahs
Best of Everything Ever	2013	Cape Town Grandwest Arena
Best of Everything Ever	2013	Bahrain
Best of Everything Ever	2013	Dubai
Best of Everything Ever	2013	Johannesburg Gold Reef City Lyric Theatre
Stand Up Chameleon	2012	Amsterdam Comedy Theater
Stand Up Chameleon	2012	London Clapham Grand
Stand Up Chameleon	2012	Bournemouth
Stand Up Chameleon	2012	Dublin Laughter Lounge
Stand Up Chameleon	2012	Australia New Zealand tour
Stand Up Chameleon	2012	Johannesburg Emperors Palace
Stand Up Chameleon	2012	Durban Sibaya
Stand Up Chameleon	2012	Pretoria Atterbury Theatre
Stand Up Chameleon	2012	Botswana Grand Palm Casino and Resort
Stand Up Chameleon	2012	Zimbabwe 7 Arts Theatre
Stand Up Chameleon	2012	Johannesburg Sun City
Stand Up Chameleon	2012	Johannesburg Gold Reef City Lyric Theatre
Serial Comic Tour	2011	Grand Arena at Grand West Casino CT Solo performance SOLD OUT
Serial Comic Tour	2011	South Africa Tour SOLD OUT
Serial Comic Tour	2011	Australia and New Zealand
Serial Comic Tour	2011	United Kingdom and UAE
Serial Comic Tour	2011	National Theatre of Namibia
Serial Comic Tour	2011	Grand Arena at Grand West Casino CT Solo performance SOLD OUT
Bafunny Bafunny	2011	Durban, Johannesburg, Cape Town
Serial Comic Tour	2011	Public Event hosted in the Democratic Republic of the Congo

DVDs	Year	Note
The Live Series	2014	Special developed for DSTV Box Office by Mannequin Pictures
Lag 'n Slag	2014	Featuring Tolla van der Merwe, Leon Schuster, Nataniël
Serial Comic	2011	Live at The Lyric Theatre, Gold Reef City
Working Class Cousin	2008	Live at Port Elizabeth Opera House
Afri-Cousin Live	2005	Live at Emperors Palace
Here we go again	2001	Awarded gold disc for sales exceeding 25,000
Live and Switched On	1999	Filmed at Barney's, Randburg Waterfront

TV	Year	Note
SABC 2 Morning Live	2016	Guest in studio
The Live Series	2016	Developed for DSTV Box Office by Mannequin Pictures
My Story	2015	Documentary series featuring Barry Hilton in Episode 4
The Expresso Show	2014	Talk Show Guest Top Gear
I love South Africa	2014	Game Show Guest
SABC 2 Morning Live	2013	Guest in studio
The Expresso Show	2013	Talk Show Guest
The Expresso Show	2012	Talk Show Guest
The Expresso Show	2012	Talk Show Guest
The Generation Game	2008	Host (SABC2)
Funny you should say that	2003	Host
Catch a wake up!	1996	Host with Liz Meiring

Commercials	Year	Note
Chevrolet campaign	2014	National South African TV advertisement
Lasher Tools	2014	National South African TV advertisement
VW Fox	NA	National South African TV advertisement
Romans Pizza	2011	National South African TV advertisement
Savanna Cider	1999	Face of the brand 1999 – 2011
Sunday Times SA	NA	National South African TV advertisement
Spray and Cook	NA	National South African TV advertisement
Nashua Printers	NA	National South African TV advertisement

Film	Year	Note
Snaaks Genoeg	2016	Black Comedy
	Cast	Casper De Vries, Shaleen Surtie-Richards, Johan Botha, Sandra Prinsloo and Benedikt Sebastian
	2016	Due for release August 2016
Outrageous	2010	Comedy stand-up movie
	Cast	Mark Banks, Loyiso Gola, Joey Rasdien, Riaad Moosa, John Vlismas
	2010	Screened, The Taormina Film Festival, Sicily Italy
Finding Lenny	2009	Lead role nomination, Best Actor, Feel Good Film Festival, Hollywood
	2009	Winner best narrative feature at the Pan African Film Festival in Cannes
