= Matthew Wesenbeck =

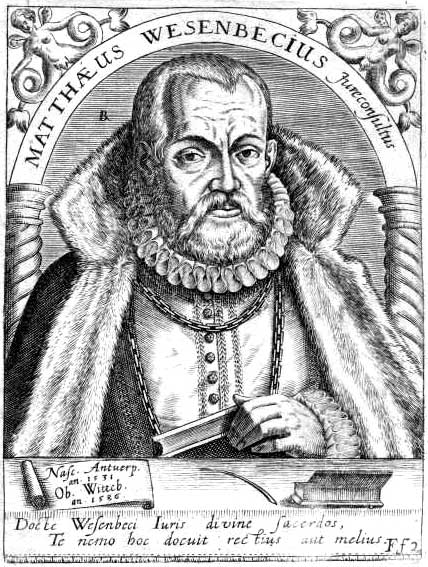
Engraving of Matthew Wesenbeck from an evangelical church in Wittenberg, Germany

Matthew Wesenbeck (Dutch: Mattheus van Wesenbeek; French: Mathieu Wesembeke; Latin: Matthaeus Wesenbecius) (25 October 1531 – 5 June 1586) was a jurist and a student of Gabriel Mudaeus. His Latin surname was also spelled Wesembecius or Vesembecius.

Wesenbeck was a Protestant writer widely known and cited during his time. He taught at Jena and Wittenberg.

== Works ==
- Paratitla in Pandectarum iuris civilis libros quinquaginta (1566)
- Tractatus et responsa quae vulgo consilia appelantur (1576)
- Tractatus de feudis
