= Vancouver Fringe Festival =

Theatre festival in Vancouver, Canada

Coordinates: 49.2699°N 123.1352°W

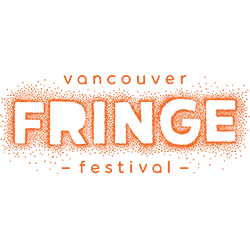

The Vancouver Fringe Festival is an annual alternative theatre festival held in Vancouver, British Columbia, Canada established in 1985. The event is organized and sponsored by the Vancouver Fringe Theatre Society, a non-profit organization founded in 1983 as the First Vancouver Theatrespace Society. The festival is usually staged in September at a number of venues around the city.

The Fringe employs an "everyone is welcome" selection technique—the Mainstage shows are literally drawn out of a hat, giving all artists, from novice to veteran, a chance to participate. Vancouver Fringe Festival Mainstage shows feature some of Vancouver's best venues including the Revue Stage, Performance Works, and the Waterfront Theatre, all situated on and around Granville Island. The Bring Your Own Venue (BYOV) category allows artists to stage original work in unconventional places. The Fringe strives to break down traditional boundaries and encourage open dialogue between audiences and artists by presenting live un-juried, uncensored theatre in an accessible and informal environment. All artists receive 100% of regular box office revenues generated during the Festival.

== History ==
The first Vancouver Fringe Festival was held in 1985. It was centred in Mount Pleasant and held its opening ceremonies in the parking lot of an IGA. The 220 performances were held in seven venues with 4,000 people in attendance—and only 25 volunteers helping out. Anchor venues in Mount Pleasant included the Western Front, Heritage Hall, and later, for the Fringe Bar, the Mount Pleasant Legion.

In 1995, the festival relocated to Commercial Drive. The Fringe's first home on the Drive was above the novelty shop where Havana Restaurant is located today. Known as the Production Palace, it was a hub for staff, volunteers, and others. At that time, the festival introduced "bring your own venue", in which performers stage performances at places other than those provided by the festival organizers.

By 2001, the Fringe was primarily centralized on Granville Island. Its opening ceremony that year included a parade around the Island that went against the flow of one way traffic.

The 2012 festival saw an improvised musical based on the works of William Shakespeare. Increased professional standards have resulted in the Fringe introducing programs such as its "Dramatic Works Series".

The COVID-19 pandemic forced changes for the 2020 season, which featured online events and limited in-person performances.

== Theatre Wire ==
Theatre Wire was created to facilitate connections between all the smaller theatre companies in Vancouver. Theatre Wire was a one-stop shop for independent theatre happenings but ceased operation in 2020.
