= Calgary Fringe Festival =

Annual Fringe theatre festival in Calgary, Canada

Coordinates: 51°02′23″N 114°04′17″W

The Calgary Fringe Festival is an annual Fringe theatre festival in Calgary, Alberta.

== History ==
The earliest Fringe-type drama festival in Calgary was the Plan B Festival, held in 2000 at a variety of locations in both Calgary's downtown and the neighbouring community of Inglewood. The Plan B Festival arose after the 2000 Calgary Fringe Festival was cancelled due to administrative difficulties, and involved (and was organized by) many of the same artists that were originally planning on partaking in the aborted Fringe. Calgary Artist/Activist Patricia Anne Duquette, on behalf of Green Fools Physical Theatre Co., coordinated a massive community effort to rescue the festival with the additional aims of setting a precedent for future fundraising efforts. Approximately 6,000 people attended the adhoc presentations and events over the course of five days, establishing an overwhelming show of interest among Calgarians. The first official Fringe festivals in Calgary took place in 2001 and 2002, organized primarily by the Loose Moose Theatre company, and based entirely in the inner-city neighbourhood of Inglewood. These were short, three-day festivals, held the weekend after the Edmonton International Fringe Festival. However, after the completion of the 2002 festival, Loose Moose lost their lease on the Garry Theatre, and were thus unable to produce the Fringe in subsequent years.

=== Re-establishment ===
A new license to produce a Fringe in Calgary was secured from the Canadian Association of Fringe Festivals in 2005 by a new team headed by Blair Gallant and Jason Rothery, and a new Fringe was held in the summer of 2006. Many elements have changed from the earlier Fringes, including time, scope and locations. The Calgary Fringe Festival is now a full-length 9-day theatre festival: 2021 dates are Fri. July 30--Sat. Aug. 7, almost the same time as Saskatoon Fringe, and just before the Aug. 12 start of the Edmonton Fringe. In previous years when they overlapped, a number of shows were performed at both Fringes, either closing in Calgary early or opening in Edmonton late. In addition to the theatrical performances (greatly increased to 36 from the roughly dozen in the 01 and 02 Fringes), the 2006 Calgary Fringe included street performances and vendors (typical for a Fringe) as well as a film festival, visual arts displays and live music (less common). The 2006 Calgary Fringe was held at a number of venues; the festival elements, film, visual art and music were held on 17th Avenue in the Beltline district, with the theatrical performances split between the nearby Calgary Opera rehearsal hall and the more distant EPCOR Centre for the Performing Arts, located in the downtown.

=== Present ===
The festival is currently held in the Inglewood neighbourhood of Calgary. Michele Gallant is the Executive Director and Producer. Compared to other fringe festivals, the Calgary Fringe Festival is classified as a smaller festival, averaging about 30 shows a year.

== Tickets ==
Performance tickets are $20 for non-members, $15 for members. Tickets to individual shows can then be purchased on the festival website. Artists receive 100% of the ticket price, minus fees.

== Festival events ==
=== Lottery draw ===
The artist draw for the Calgary Fringe happens at the beginning of December. The 2019 draw was held December 5th, at Village Brewery. It was hosted by Calgary improv group, The Kinkonauts. The event was also live-streamed on Facebook.

== Venues ==
There are two kinds of venues in the Calgary Fringe: Fringe Managed Venues (FMVs) which are lottery drawn and Artist Managed Venues (AMVs) which are first come, first serve. FMVs are run by the festival and are assigned to artists drawn in the festival lottery. AMVs are run by artists who were not drawn in the lottery and are therefore arranging their own venue. AMVs that are outside the festival neighbourhood of Inglewood are sometimes also referred to as "satellite" venues.

=== FMV Lottery Venues ===
- 2019
  - Lantern Church, Festival Hall, Lunchbox Theatre, Vertigo Theatre, Alexandra Centre

=== AMVs ===
- 2019
  - Gravity Espresso & Wine Bar, Ironwood Stage & Grill

== Awards ==
The Calgary Fringe Festival awards the following each year:

=== Best of Fest Venue Series ===
One show per lottery venue is selected for this award. Selected shows are given an extra performance on the last Saturday of the festival. This award is determined by a special festival committee and patron feedback.

== See also ==
- Fringe Theatre
- Festivals in Alberta
