= Simon Lemming Talbot =

Simon Talbot
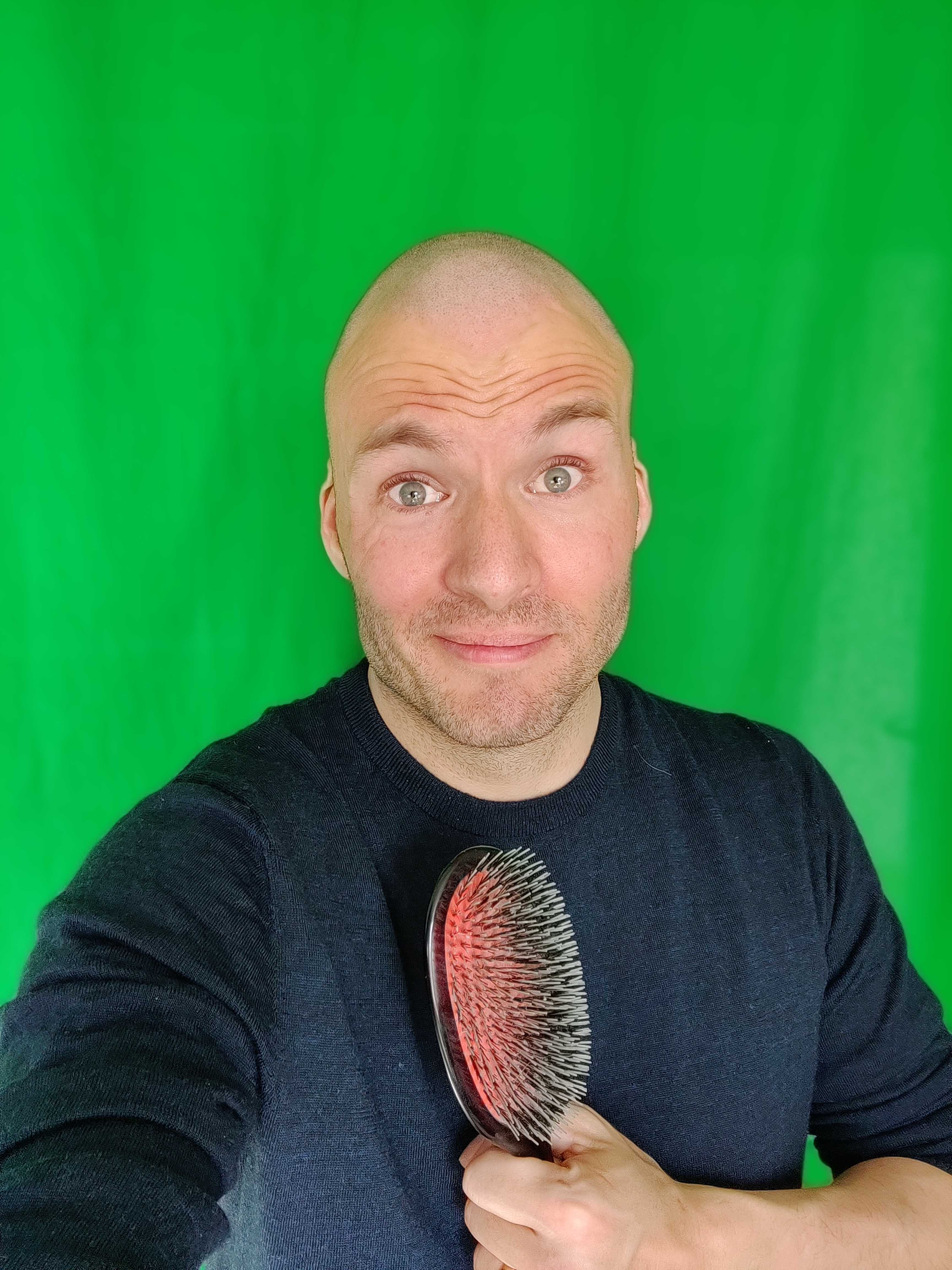
- Born: Simon Lemming Talbot; 18 July 1986 (age 39)
- Spouse: Katrine Køhler

Comedy career
- Years active: 2006-present
- Medium: Stand-up, television, stream
- Website: simontalbot.dk

Simon Lemming Talbot (born 18 July 1986) is a Danish-Irish comedian & Twitch streamer. He is best known for his various stand-up shows, appearances in numerous Danish TV-shows and his stand-up set on The Russell Howard Hour. His career breakthrough was winning the Danish version of Last Comic Standing in 2009, and he has since performed in sold-out theaters across Denmark, given standing ovations. He has had numerous successful and critically acclaimed shows, and his recent tour of Denmark sold 50,000 tickets.

== Career ==
In 2006 he achieved a fourth place in at the national competition of Standup, and chose to leave his childhood city Skanderborg and moved to Copenhagen to develop his career as a stand-up comedian. The same year he won the Danish Open in Stand-Up, which took place in Aarhus.

Simon participated in the second (2007) and third (2008) seasons of the show Comedy Fight Club (Danish version of Last Comic Standing) on national tv (TV 2 Zulu). He achieved a second place in the second season and in the third season he won.

In 2008 he participated in the third season of the racing-show Zulu Djævleræs. Simon & Mascha Vang was put together as a team and went to the finals.

In 2009, he participated in Comedy Aid, which collects money for Kræftens Bekæmpelse (Danish Cancer Society). In the year of 2010 he hosted the show.

In late 2009 Talbot starred in the show Hvor fanden er Herning? which was aired on TV 2 Zulu. He played the role of Benjamin, who was the main character's best friend.

In 2010, Simon Talbot was a writer at the magazine Woman.

In March 2010, he starred as a co-host and writer, together with the comedian Jacob Wilson, on the national TV show Bingo Banko.

From 2011 to 2012, Talbot was a part of the national TV sketch show "Live fra Bremen", which is the Danish version of Saturday Night Live.

In 2016, Talbot starred in his own sketch show "Simon Talbot's Sketch Show", which was aired on the national TV channel TV 2 Zulu.

In 2017, Talbot hosted Comedy Central's show 'Standup Uden Grænser' (Standup Beyond Borders), which was a comedy show that combined comedians located all over Scandinavia.

In 2019, Simon Talbot made a stand-up set on The Russell Howard Hour, with the clip on YouTube amassing over one million views.

Simon Talbot has a passion for gaming and has performed his gaming related stand-up sets numerous times at gaming events. 2019 became the year, where he combined his comedic talent with his love for video games, by creating the company 'Simon Talbot Streaming' and started to stream weekly on his Twitch-channel by the name of 'SimonTalbotComedy'. The highlights of the streams are later published on his YouTube Channel, and social media pages such as Facebook, Instagram and Twitter.

=== Stand-up shows ===
==== Damp ====
Simon Talbot did his first one-man show Damp in 2011. The show premiered on 26 of August 2011 in Musikhuset Aarhus. The tour of the show was marked as a mini-tour since Simon only visited the towns of Aarhus, Aalborg, Frederiksberg, Vejle, Odense, Holstebro, Sønderborg and Esbjerg. Afterwards the show was sold on DVD nationally.

==== Talle alene i verden (Talle alone in the world) ====
The second one-man show by Talbot was "Talle alene i verden" (in English: 'Talle alone in the world'), which was a reference to a danish children's book.

==== Mr. Copenhagen ====
Mr. Copenhagen was Simon Talbot's third one-man show and the theme was built around the stereotypes of Danish society. He tells the story of him being born in Jutland (the mainland peninsula of Denmark) and him moving to the capital Copenhagen, which is located on Zealand (one of Denmark's islands).

==== Make Denmark Great Again ====
In 2017, Talbot started pursuing his long-time dream doing comedy in English and moved to Los Angeles, USA. In 2018 he made his fourth one-man show "Make Denmark Great Again", where he tells the story of his first international experience. The Comedy Show centered around the theme, that the traditional mindset of a Danish person is very self-destructive compared to the traditional American mindset of "you can do, what you set your mind to", and the pros and cons of those differences.

The Surrogate Comedy Show

During the national lockdown, due to the COVID-19 virus, Simon Talbot wrote and performed the world's first interactive comedy show. The interactive features of the show made it possible for the audience to show their participation visually and audibly. Due to the sponsor of Simon Talbot's streaming content (under the company 'Simon Talbot Streaming') OnePlus, the show was live-streamed for free on his Twitch-channel on 31 March 2020 and was later published on his YouTube. The show was called "The Surrogate Comedy Show", referring to the rhesus monkey experiments by Harry Harlow in the 1950s.

===== Danish Invasion =====
Simon was supposed to launch his international Stand-up tour Danish Invasion in the 2020. The international stand-up tour was cancelled due to COVID-19. He did a mini-tour in Denmark which was filmed and broadcast on national television.

===== Optur =====
Simon is launching a Danish stand-up tour named 'Optur' in the 2021 & 2022.

== Personal life ==
Simon grew up with his mother Irene Lemming, who is a member of Jehovah's Witnesses. Simon was never baptized as a Jehovah's Witness and left the faith at the age of 14. On his mother's side of the family, he has a brother named Christian. Simon's father is named Thomas James Talbot and is from Ireland. Due to his father being Irish, Simon sees himself as being half-Irish. On his father's side of the family he has two brothers. Thomas James Talbot and Shane James Talbot.

In April 2017 Simon got engaged to Katrine Køhler. They married in July 2019.
