= Gabriël van der Hofstadt =

Flemish Baroque painter

Gabriël van der Hofstadt (1620, Brussels – 1690, Antwerp), was a Flemish Baroque painter of religious works.

== Biography ==
According to Houbraken he was born in Brussels and became a portrait painter. He later took to painting historical allegories, specializing in passion pieces and martyr works, of which many can still be seen in altarpieces in Brabant.

According to the RKD he claimed to be 24 years old in 1645. No known works survive. Cornelis de Bie called him "Gerrit van Hoochstad" in his book of painter biographies called Het Gulden Cabinet. He claimed that he was a highly regarded painter who was good at portraiture, but became more interested in the mystery of the passion and painted many holy saints and altarpieces that could be seen in the churches of Brussels and its surrounding towns. Houbraken used De Bie as his source, and spelled the name "Gerrit van Hoochstadt".
