= Patrick Meyer =

Patrick Meyer may refer to:

- Canadian Green Party candidate for the federal election of 2008 in Langley
- A German-speaking Belgian politician, member of the CSP, in the Parliament of the German-speaking Community as of 2010

== See also ==
- Pat Meyer (born 1972), American football coach
- Patrick DeMeyer, Belgian songwriter, composer and producer
- Patrick Mayer (disambiguation)
