= Saluche =

Vincentian comedian (1948–2007)

- Born: Lucien Small; 1948; Kingstown, Saint Vincent, British Windward Islands
- Died: 14 January 2007 (age 58); Dorsetshire Hill, Kingstown, Saint Vincent and the Grenadines
- Spouse: Helen Small (née Hazell)
- Children: 2 daughters from 1st marriage: Sharese and Lucia

Comedy career
- Medium: Stand-up
- Genres: Observational comedy, satire
- Subjects: Culture of Saint Vincent and the Grenadines, current events, everyday life

Lucien "Saluche" Small (1948 – 14 January 2007) was a Vincentian comedian, storyteller, and radio personality. He was dubbed the "King of Comedy" in Saint Vincent due to his regular appearances at local and regional festivals.

== Early life ==
Lucien Small was born in Kingstown in 1948. His schoolmates nicknamed him "Sir Lucien", which he changed to "Sir Luce", then "Sir Luche", and later "Saluche".

Saluche helped raise his younger twin brothers Julian and Lloyd upon their father's death in 1969. He worked for Cable & Wireless, eventually becoming a warehouse manager. He was a member of the Commercial, Technical and Allied Workers' Union (CTAWU).

== Career ==
Saluche first achieved recognition as a comedian in Trinidad and Tobago in the early 1990s before returning to Saint Vincent. He liked to make observations about everyday situations: he once joked that the seashore was the best location for a laundry, as one could obtain free Tide, Surf, and Breeze. Other jokes veered into more risqué themes and current politics. His catchphrase was "You got to clap for that!"

Saluche performed in various countries. He appeared at the Spice Laugh Festival and the Fisherman's Birthday Celebrations in Grenada. He also appeared at the Apollo Theater in New York City and the Caribbean Comedy Festival in Washington D.C.

Saluche hosted "Night Riders", a program that aired every Thursday on Nice Radio. Besides his own material, Saluche featured pieces sent in by listeners and upcoming artists.

In 2006, the ruling Unity Labour Party blacklisted Saluche from government jobs for telling political jokes at their expense. This prohibition drastically reduced his public performances; ULP-affiliated organizers for that year's Carnival also refused to hire Saluche. As a result, Saluche asked opposition leader Arnhim Eustace for support, joining Eustace's New Democratic Party.

== Family ==
Although Saluche's father died in 1969, his mother was still alive at the time of his death. Saluche had two daughters from his first marriage. He later married Helen Hazell, an office manager for The Vincentian newspaper. They remained married until his death; she died in 2017.

== Death ==
Saluche died of a heart attack at his home in Dorsetshire Hill on 14 January 2007. He was 58. The Minister of Culture Rene Baptiste paid tribute to Saluche, calling him "the funniest man in St. Vincent and the Grenadines".

Prime Minister Ralph Gonsalves, leader of the Unity Labour Party, attended Saluche's funeral without prior announcement. Gonsalves was then asked to speak in place of featured speaker Eustace by some family members; this change drew boos from attending NDP supporters.

== Legacy ==
In 2013, the Department of Culture (within the Ministry of Tourism, Sports and Culture) proposed a "Book of Remembrance" to commemorate prominent Vincentians. Saluche was one of the Department's initial candidates for inclusion.

The "Night Riders" radio program continued to air, with Ferrand "Randy D" Dopwell as the new host. In addition, a Night Rider nonprofit was founded to continue Saluche's community service work.

The 2007 edition of the Caribbean Comedy Festival in Montreal was dedicated to Saluche. He had appeared in every edition of the festival since it was founded.

== Album appearances ==
- Island Comedy: Word Masters Live (2001)
- Word Masters Live II: Caribbean Comedy (2001)
- Caribbeana Celebrates 25th Anniversary: Caribbean Comedy Festival 2002
