= Gabriel Mudaeus =

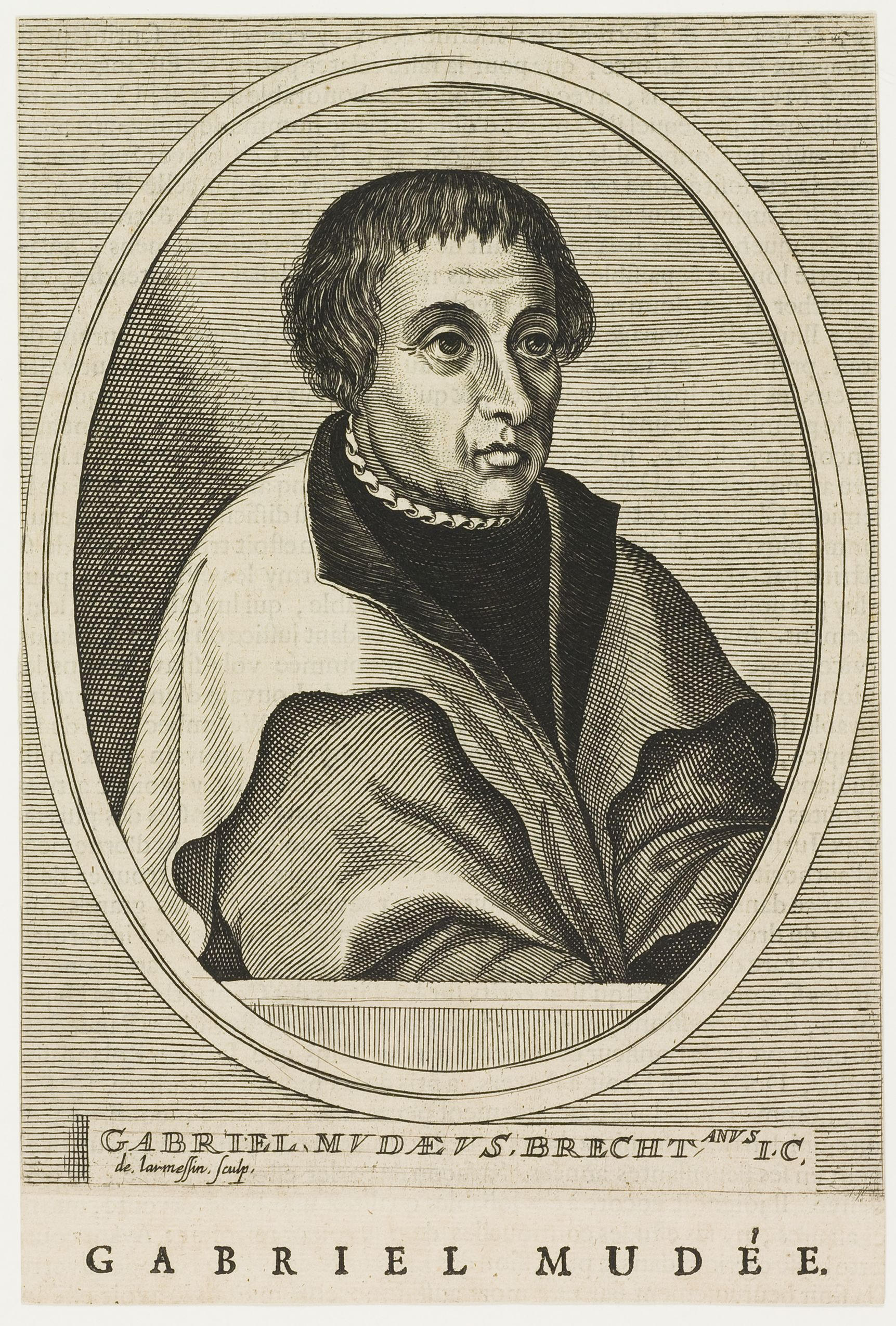
Gabriel Mudaeus

Gabriel Mudaeus (c. 1500, Brecht – 21 April 1560, Leuven), born Gabriël van der Muyden, was a Flemish jurist and humanist who revived the study of law in the Habsburg Netherlands.

As a professor in the Faculty of Law at the University of Louvain, Mudaeus introduced the Erasmian method of research into a field that had been dominated exclusively by tradition; among his pupils were François Baudouin, Jacob Reyvaert (Raevardus), and Matthew Wesenbeck.

== Works ==
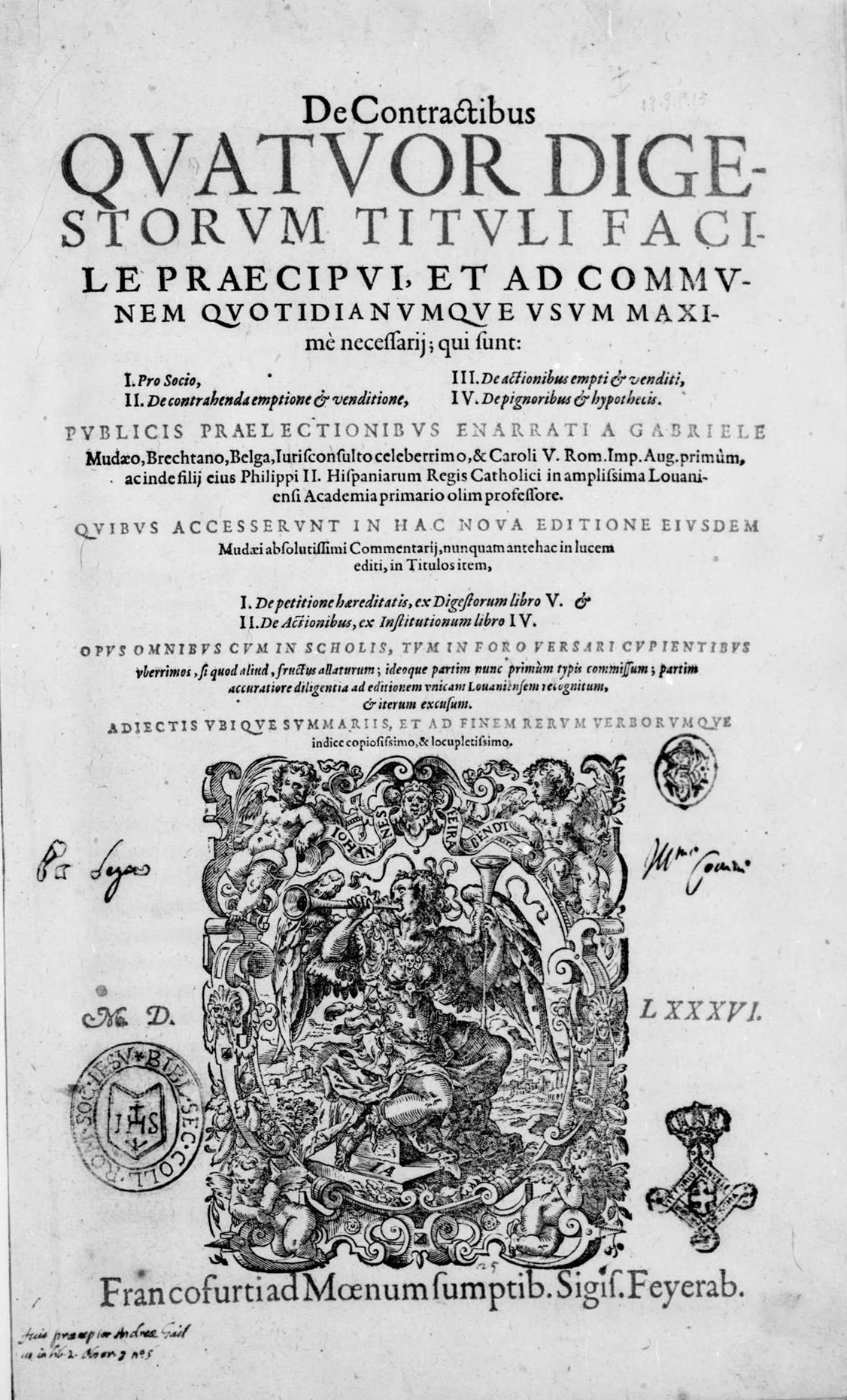
De contractibus, 1586

- De contractibus (in Latin). Frankfurt am Main: Peter Schmidt. 1586.
