= Mel Kelly =

Mel Kelly (born 22 October 1972) is an Irish stand-up comedian and international speaker based in Munich since 2003. Kelly began his speaking career in 2004, has spoken on stages in Europe, the US and Thailand. He has also won several European Speaking Contests in English and in German.

Mel is an author of two books.

Kelly began his comedy career in 2014. He has founded the biggest English-German comedy club in Munich “Comedy Club Munich” and started his first comedy tour in Germany with “Die Irren on Tour” in February 2016. Mel is the star of a YouTube show "Disastrous Dating" by which was later rebranded as "Disastrous Life Coaching".

Kelly has been receiving increasing Germany media attention in Germany for his comedy career.

== Competitive awards ==
Since 2006, Kelly has won 11 awards in competitions in two languages at district conferences of Toastmasters International:

Language	Date	Location	Category	Place	Reference
English	May 2006	Cologne, Germany	Evaluation	1	
English	May 2008	Prague, Czech Republic	Evaluation	2	
English	May 2008	Prague, Czech Republic	International	3	
English	May 2008	Bamberg, Germany	Table Topics	?	
English	May 2009	Düsseldorf, Germany	Evaluation	1	
English	May 2010	Barcelona, Spain	Table Topics	1	
English	May 2012	Poznań, Poland	International	3	
English	November 2013	Budapest, Hungary	Humorous	1	
German	November 2013	Budapest, Hungary	Table Topics	2	
German	November 2014	Kraków, Poland	Humorous	2	
German	May 2014	Frankfurt, Germany	Speech	2	

== Publications ==
Books

- Kelly, Mel (2017). Born in Ireland, Made in Germany.
- Kelly, Mel (2021). Top Tips for Dating Disasters in Germany.
- Kelly, Mel (2023). Top Tips for Interview Disasters in Germany.

== Shows ==
Title	Released	Notes
How to Become German in 61.2 Minutes	18 May 2019	Live at Shamrock Munich
How to Find Love in Germany in 61.2 Minutes	10 December 2022	Live at Shamrock Munich
How to Become a Double German in 61.2 Minutes	04 May 2024	Live at Shamrock Munich
How to Survive Your Job in Germany in 61.2 Minutes	29 Mar 2025	Live at Shamrock Munich
