= Charlie Moreno =

American stand-up comic and an actor (born 1978)

- Born: Charlie Moreno; November 8, 1978 (age 47); El Paso, Texas, U.S.
- Notable work: A Cry For Help

Comedy career
- Years active: 2001 - present
- Medium: Stand up comedy, television
- Genres: Dark, Sarcasm

Charlie Moreno (born November 8, 1978) is an American stand-up comic and an actor. His comedy routines are known for being dark and morbid, and often include humorous tales from his traumatic life.

== Partial television appearances ==
- The People's Court (2001)
- Law & Order (2002)
- Third Watch (2002)
- Evening At The Apollo (2003)
