= Martin Høgsted =

Danish stand-up comedian (born 1982)

Martin Høgsted (born in 1982, Dianalund) is a Danish stand-up comedian. He is known for UPS! Det er live, and as writer from Live fra Bremen. He debuted as comedian in 2006 on Comedy Zoo in Copenhagen and won DM i stand-up (Best Danish stand-up comedian) in 2008.

== Filmography ==
- UPS! Det er live (Oh! It's live)
- Live fra Bremen (Live from Bremen)
- Stand-up.dk
- Mørk & Jul (Moerk and Jul)
- Danish Dynamite
