= Sam See =

Singaporean stand up comedian (born 1993)

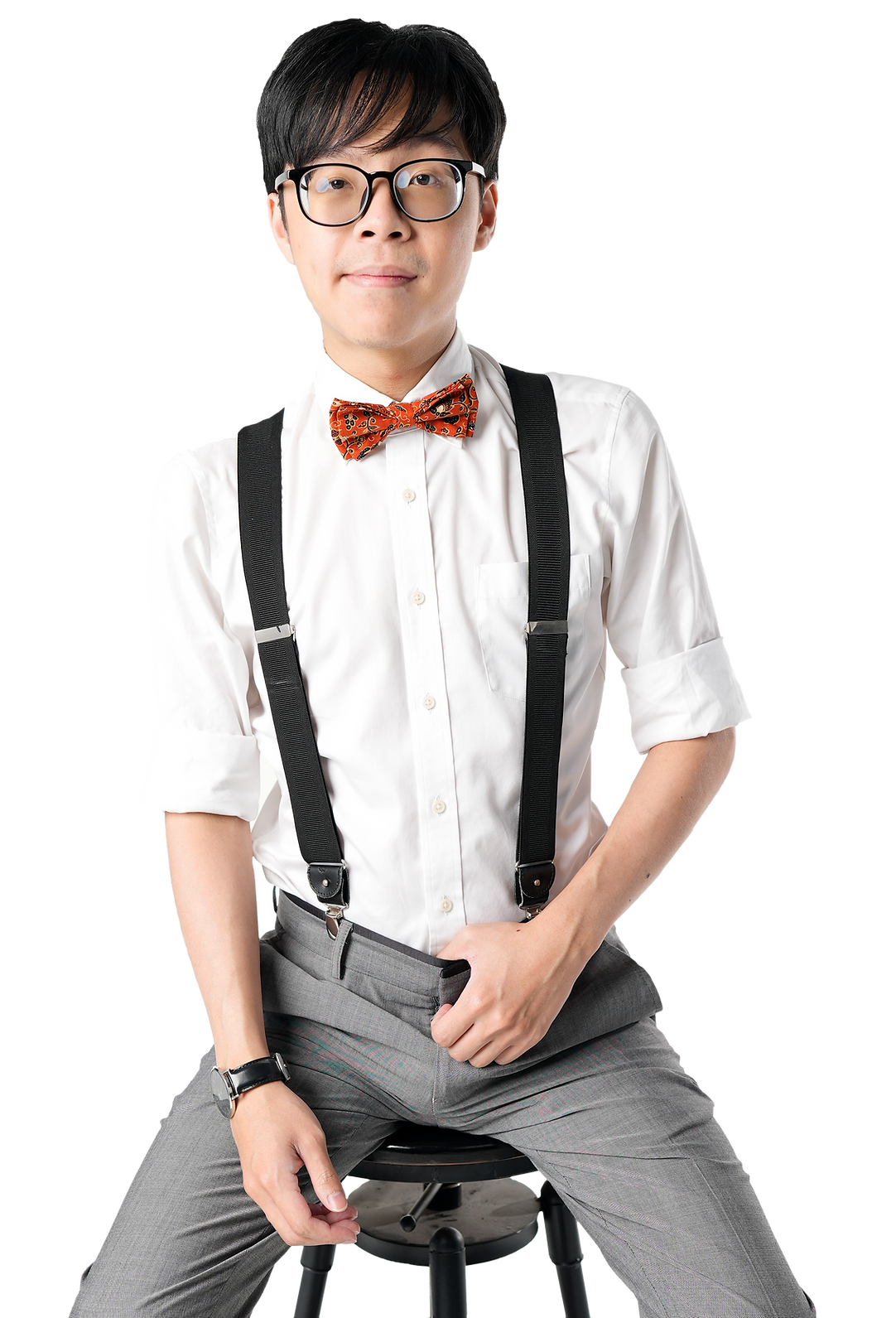
- Born: 30 September 1993 (age 31); Singapore
- Occupations: Comedian; Voice Actor; Host
- Years active: 2012–present
- Website: Official website

Sam See (born 30 September 1993) is a Singaporean stand up comedian and improvisor.

== Early life ==
See had his primary and secondary education at Saint Andrew's School, Singapore. After, he studied at Temasek Polytechnic, and was awarded The Integrated Infocomm Scholarship from the Infocomm Media Development Authority in 2010.

== Career ==
=== Comedy ===
In 2012, See started performing stand-up comedy in Singapore at an open mic called Talking Cock. He had previously discovered comedy online, performed by Kumar and Eddie Izzard while schooling. He had also started to perform publicly as an openly gay man during this time. He has also worked as a showrunner and producer, and was the director of The Comedy Club.

In 2019, See brought his stand-up comedy show, Coming Out Loud, to the Edinburgh Festival Fringe. In August 2020, he released Coming Out Loud online.

In 2022, See returned to the Edinburgh Festival Fringe with a second stand-up show, Government Approved Sex. The show was based on See's experience of being approached by the National Library Board to run a panel course about sex and romance education. During that same year, See was also one of ten writers long-listed for the 2023 Epigram Books Fiction Prize.

In 2023, See brought Government Approved Sex to the Melbourne International Comedy Festival and back again to the Edinburgh Festival Fringe. He performed the show in Singapore at the Drama Centre Theatre, before moving to London. In December, See performed for the United Nations Human Rights Council's Stand-Up for Human Rights in Bangkok, in celebration of the 75th Anniversary of the Universal Declaration of Human Rights.

In 2024, See brought a comedy-storytelling show And I Can't Feel At Home In This World Anymore to the Melbourne and Edinburgh Comedy Festivals. He also started making appearances with No Rolls Barred, a YouTube channel that creates board game content, known for their Blood On The Clocktower videos.

He also performs improv with the troupe The Latecomers.

=== Television ===
In 2016, See was a performer on OK Chope!, a weekly live comedy panel show in Singapore where he appeared in all thirty episodes as a panelist and an on-location reporter. The show was cancelled after a joke made by another panelist about Prime Minister of Malaysia Najib Razak.

In 2019, See appeared on Comedy Central Stand-Up, Asia! for its fourth season. He also appeared on The Jim Jefferies Show in an interview segment about Singaporean civil liberties. He also appeared on BBC World Service to discuss performing stand-up in Singapore.

In 2022, See provided the voice for various characters on Channel 5's Puberteens, including Winston, Marco & Benji.

=== Online streaming ===
In 2020, See started streaming online in March on Facebook and YouTube, before moving to Twitch under the username 'MrSamSee'. Besides streaming video game content, he also ran a tabletop roleplaying series called Red Dot Wrestling, which featured various professional wrestlers like Singapore Pro Wrestling Champion Da Butcherman, Malaysia Pro Wrestling Champion Cornelius LOW, Jake De Leon, and NXT wrestler Dante Chen.

== Filmography ==
=== Television ===
Year	Programme	Role	Notes
2016–2017	OK Chope!	Self - Panelist	30 episodes
2019	The Jim Jefferies Show	Self - Interviewee	Episode: "The Cost of Trading Away Freedom"
2019	Comedy Central Stand-Up, Asia!	Self - Comedian, Millennial Retiree	
2022	Puberteens	Winston / Marco / Benji / Tomas / Yusuf / Tape Monkey / Chad / Cole / Boon-Nam (voice)	14 episodes
