= Carel van Nievelt =

Dutch novelist and journalist

Carel van Nievelt (June 20, 1843 in Delfshaven – August 2, 1913 in Wiesbaden) was a Dutch novelist and journalist who also published using the pseudonyms Gabriël and J. van den Oude. He wrote travel stories and fantasies.

== Biography ==
Van Nievelt had a short stint at being a civil servant in the Dutch East Indies before he returned to the Netherlands. There he became an editor for the daily Nieuwe Rotterdamsche Courant (1869) and a contributor to Los en vast. Later he wrote book reviews using the pseudonym J. van den Oude for the daily Nieuws van den Dag.

In 1895 he moved to Wiesbaden, Germany, where he died in 1913 at the age of seventy.

== Bibliography ==
- Ontboezemingen - Revelations (1869, as Gabriël)
- Phantasiën - Fantasies (1874)
- Fragmenten - Fragments (1875)
- In bonte rij (1879)
- Chiaroscuro (1882)
- Ahasverus(1883)
- Een Alpenboek (1886)
- Bergstudiën - Mountain studies (1888)
- Herman Wolsink (1889)
- Onder zeil (1891)
- Litterarische Interludiën (1891, as J. van den Oude)
- Uit de poppenkraam onzer Romantiek (1903, as J. van den Oude)
