= Bert Gabriëls =

Belgian comedian

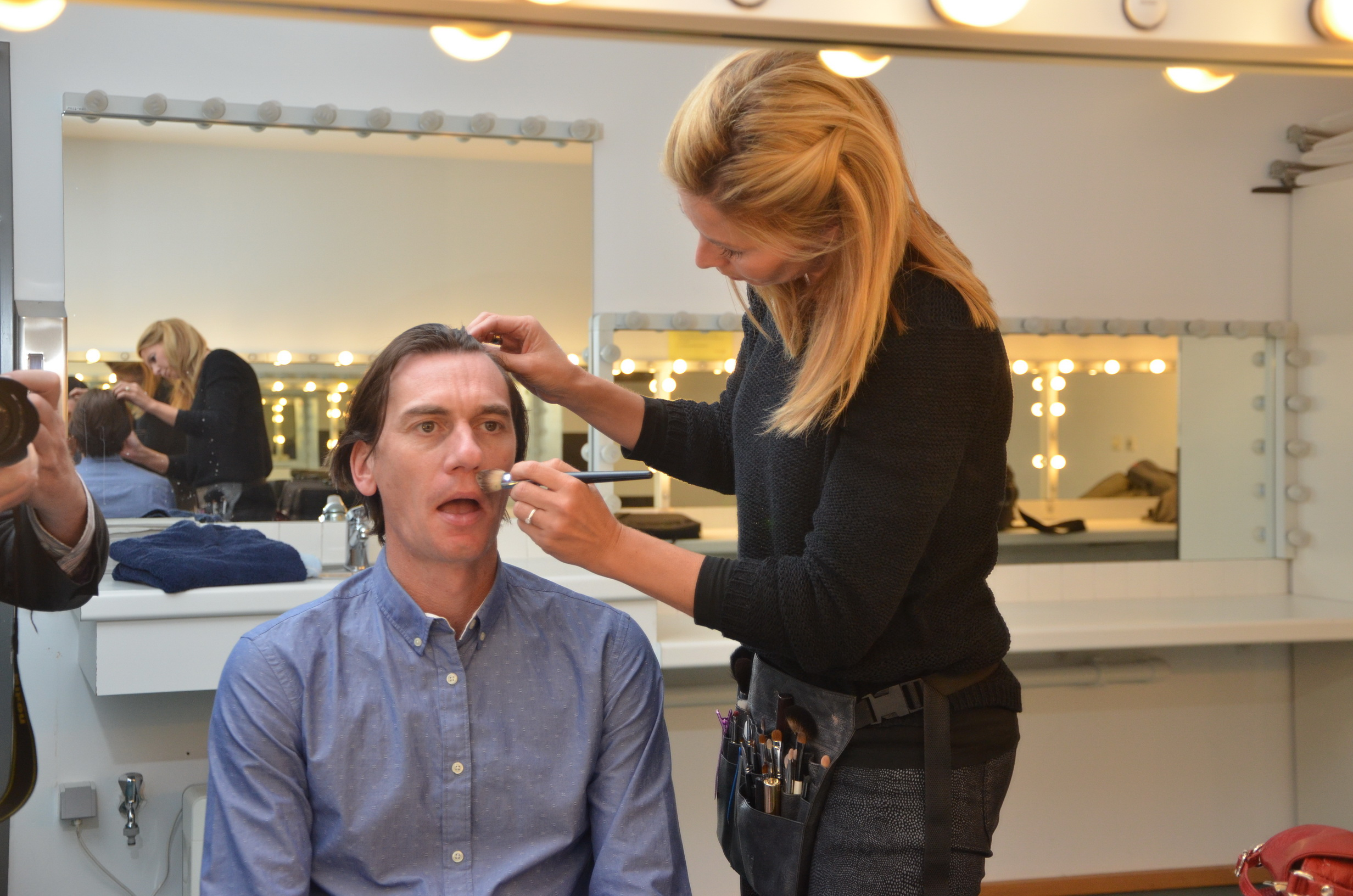
- Bert Gabriëls in 2013
- Born: December 11, 1973 (age 52); Londerzeel

Comedy career
- Years active: 2004–
- Medium: Comedy
- Website: http://www.bertgabriels.be and http://www.facebook.com/bert.gabriels

Bert Gabriëls (born December 11, 1973) is a Belgian Standup-comedian with his own award-winning television show.

Though he started his career with an atypical background. He studied Law and Philosophy on the university in Leuven. He quickly discovered his passion for the performing arts, and enrolled at the Academy of Dramatic Arts of Maastricht, where he learned to be a director. He was co-founder of a theatre company (101punt) and wrote, played and directed prize-winning theatre shows (in the Netherlands and Belgium) and played parts in several short films.

He began comedy in February 2004 on a free podium in Amsterdam. Two months later, he won second place at the Amsterdam AKF Stand up competition. He won the 123comedy Award for starting talent in June 2004, he won the Radio2 humor price, he made it to the finals of the Culture Comedy Award. In 2005 he was a finalist at the Deltion Cabaret festival, and in 2006 he won the Knock Out Comedy award in Amsterdam. After a successful first stand-up comedy show (Gestorven onzin, 2007–2008), he has just launched his second show (Pech, 2009). The DVD of his first show is available online.

His work did not go unnoticed and soon he was asked to participate in radio and television programmes as a comedian (Radioshow: MEMO, TV: In de ban van Urbanus (2005), Comedy Casino (2006–2009), SPAM (2008) and in TV talkshows (Villa Vanthilt, 2009). The next step was to create and host his own TV programme, together with Henk Rijckaert on Canvas, Zonde van de Zendtijd (2009, 2010). ‘Waste of the broadcasting time’ is a satiric programme about all media in Belgium which was rewarded in 2010 with the Flemish TV-star Award (Flemish Emmies) for 'Best Humor and Comedy program'.
