= Jej Perfekcyjność =

Polish activist (died 2023)

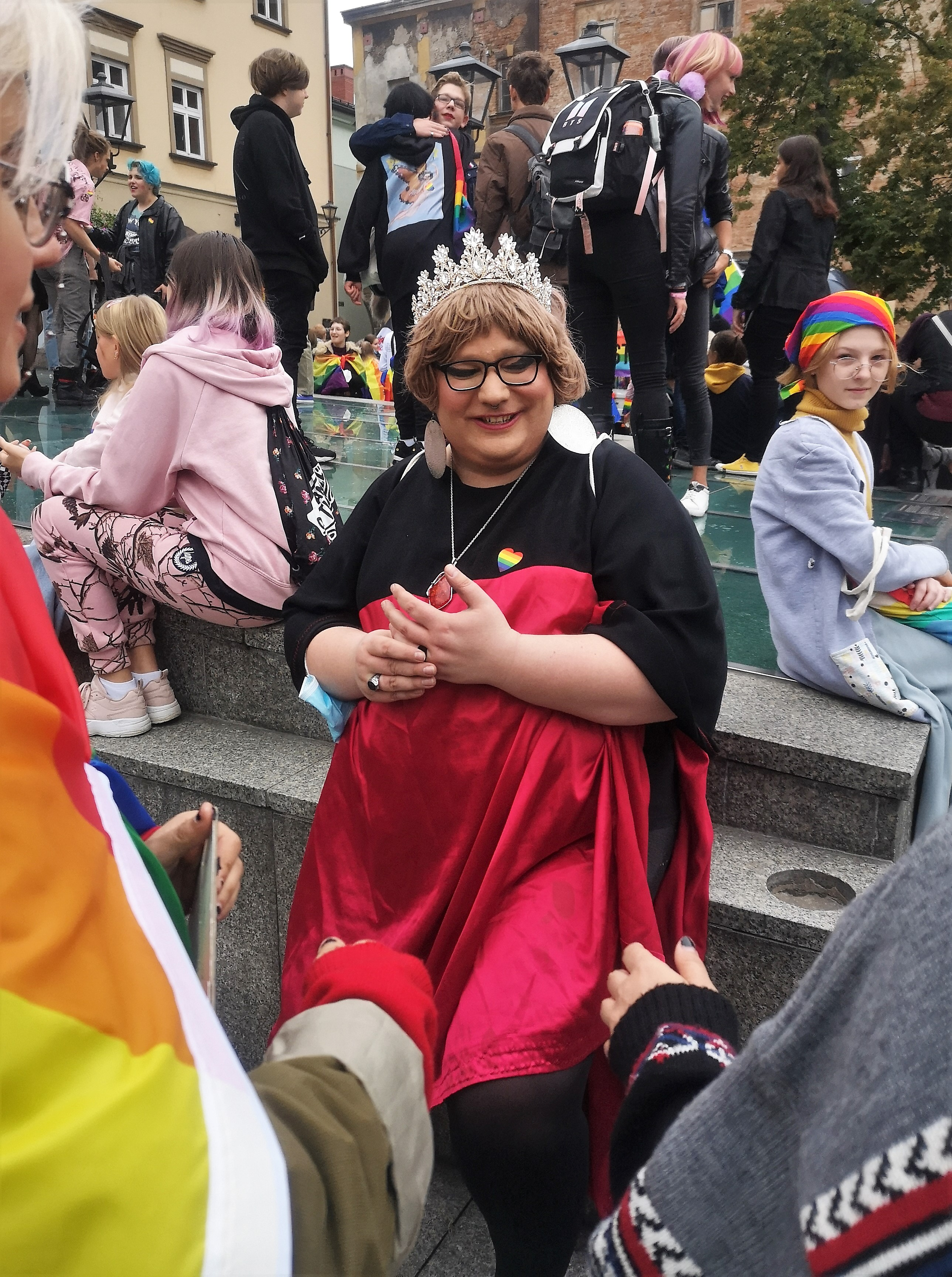
- Died: 23 April 2023
- Resting place: Goleniów, Poland
- Education: University of Warsaw
- Known for: Queer activism and academia
- Website: http://jejperfekcyjnosc.pl/

Jej Perfekcyjność (Polish pronunciation: [ˈjɛj pɛr.fɛkˈt͡sɘj.nɔɕt͡ɕ]; died 23 April 2023) was a Polish stand-up comedian, sociologist, lecturer, author and social activist, founder and long-term president of Queer UW (University of Warsaw queer studies society), president of the management board of the Pro Diversity Foundation, secretary of the management board of the Wolontariat Równości Foundation and president of the LGBT Business Forum Foundation. She identified as an agender-transgender person and used she/her pronouns, however she stated she accepted the use of other pronouns when referring to her.

== Chosen name ==
As many transgender people do, Perfekcyjność chose her new name, which was often perceived as an alias or pseudonym due to being a phrase, rather than a set of recognizable names; Jej Perfekcyjność is Polish for her perfection. However, Perfekcyjność herself frequently noted that when asked what is her name, she would have replied "Jej", making "Perfekcyjność" her chosen last name, under which she was registered with her general practitioner. She also attempted to legally change her name to her chosen one. In one of the interviews, she stated

"Jej Perfekcyjność" is not a nickname, but a name. I would like to replace the one I have in my ID with it, but I know that it will probably not be possible. People think that referring to yourself as "her perfection" is an expression of putting yourself above others, exalting yourself, but in fact it is quite the opposite. This name is to remind me of a goal that I am constantly striving for and that I know I will never reach. It is supposed to be a stimulus to strive to be better, to be perfect in the activities I undertake, in everything I do.

== Early life ==
Perfekcyjność was born in Goleniów, Poland. She realized she was not male in high school, and gained the vocabulary which allowed her to describe her situation while in university:

Even before high school, I had this feeling that something was different about me. My friends and I read porn magazines. I've noticed that I pay more attention to men than to women. In those days, men were reduced to just the penis, and the woman was shown whole. It made me nervous and I didn't know why. I started to define myself as bisexual. However, in the first year of high school, I realized that there is no need to convince myself of bisexuality, which can be a lifeline for the most frightened and confused. I decided I was gay. I went to study in Warsaw. I quickly discovered that entering into close physical relationships with men or women is not necessary for me to live. And I was uncomfortable thinking of myself as a guy.

== Scientific and didactic career ==
Perfekcyjność was a lecturer at the University of Warsaw and founder and director of the Queer UW club at that university. As a sociologist, Perfekcyjność dealt mainly with queer theory, the Polish family phenomena and social aspects of the activities of John Paul II. At the University of Warsaw, she lectured in Polish and English, e.g. journalism workshops and sex/gender and human relations courses. She also lectured at the Open University of the University of Warsaw. Her most well-known course was titled Sociology of love; Understanding contemporary relationships, breakups, and loneliness. She was the first openly transgender person to be the Speaker of the University of Warsaw Student Parliament and a member of the University of Warsaw Senate.

=== Selected works ===
Perfekcyjność authored and co-authored over 40 scholarly papers, books and articles, mainly on queer theory, but also regarding the Catholic Church under the reign of John Paul II. She was usually credited under her deadname.

- 2009: Utopijny teatr, czyli analiza sytuacji dyskoteki gejowskiej w ujęciu goffmanowskiej teorii człowieka w teatrze życia codziennego na przykładzie warszawskiego klubu Utopia (Utopian theatre, or an analysis of the situation of a gay disco in terms of Goffman's theory of man in the theater of everyday life on the example of the Warsaw club Utopia)
- 2009: Żeńska strona – druga natura. Raport z badania osób transgresyjnych płciowo o metrykalnej płci urodzeniowej męskiej (The female side – second nature. Report on the study of gender transgressive people with male birth sex)
- 2010: Raport z monitoringu głównych serwisów informacyjnych TVP w czasie kampanii prezydenckiej 2010 roku (Report on the monitoring of the main TVP news services during the 2010 presidential campaign)
- 2011: Śmierć prezydenta. Analiza momentu dyskursywnego w ogólnopolskich dziennikach drukowanych (The death of the president. Analysis of the discursive moment in nationwide printed dailies)
- 2011: Miejsce. Perspektywa. Interpretacja. Auschwitz jako dominujący dyskurs o Holocauście (Place. Perspective. Interpretation. Auschwitz as the dominant discourse on the Holocaust)
- 2012: Przychodzi lesbijka/gej/trans do lekarza. Queerowanie służby zdrowia – problemy, strategie, perspektywy (A lesbian/gay/trans person visits the doctor. Queering health care – problems, strategies, perspectives)
- 2012: Dewiant wkracza na uczelnię. Krótka historia obecności osób homoseksualnych w polskiej myśli społecznej (Deviant enters the university. A short history of the presence of homosexual people in Polish social thought)
- 2013: Kobiety samorządu UW. Raport z badania partycypacji wyborczej studentek Uniwersytetu Warszawskiego w latach 2011–13 (Women of the University of Warsaw self-government. Report on the survey of electoral participation of female students of the University of Warsaw in 2011–13)

== Social activism ==
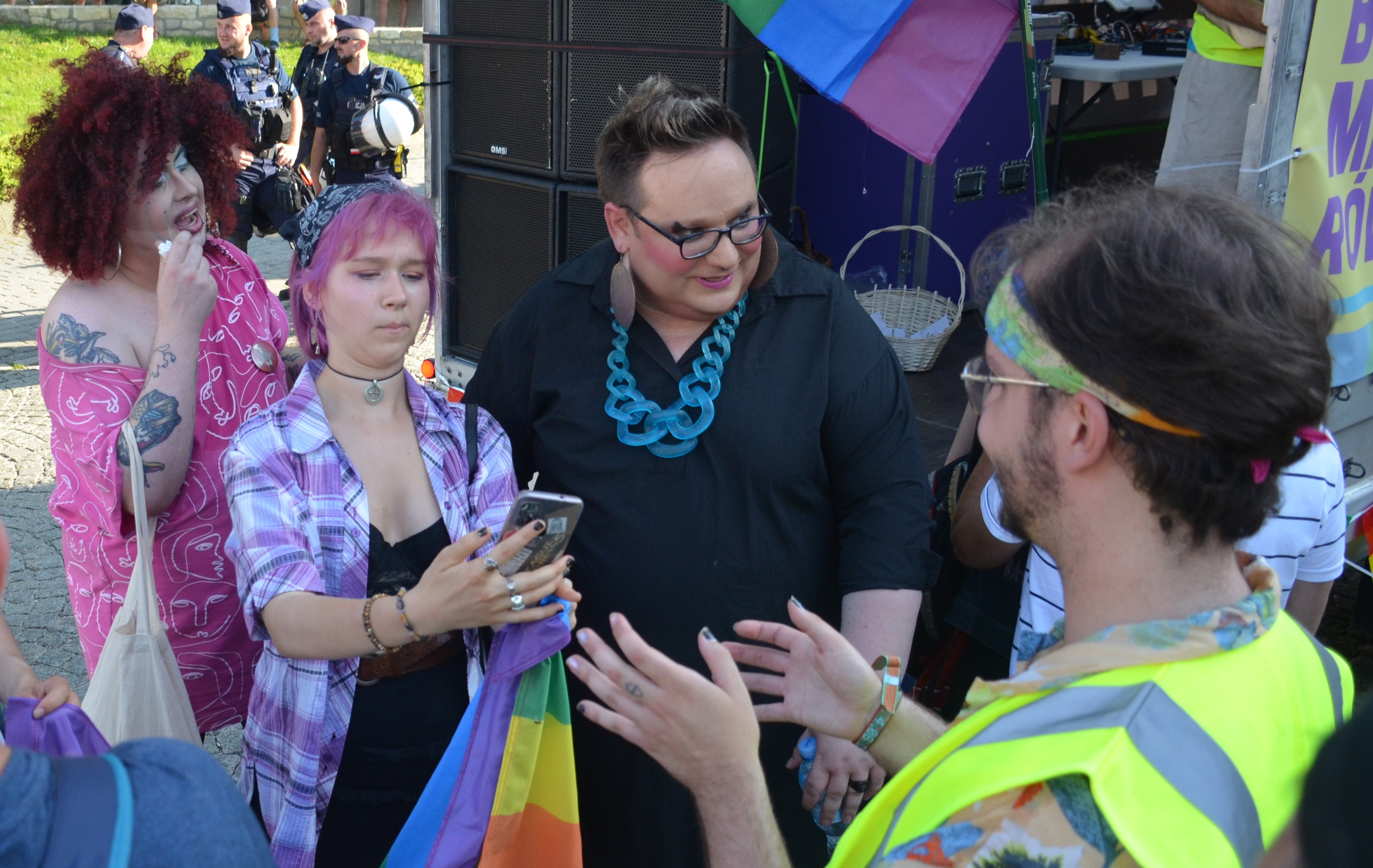
Jej Perfekcyjność during Pride Parade in Bielsko-Biała

=== Queer organizations ===
From 2011 to 2016, Perfekcyjność was one of the two organizers of the Equality Parade (acting as a spokesperson at the same time). From 2012 to 2016, she was the secretary of the board of the Wolontariat Równości Foundation. At that time, apart from the Equality Parade, she was also responsible for organizing, among others, campaign for allies of LGBT people "Proste Równanie" (commissioned by the Council of Europe) and the annual Equality Week in Ursynów. She was one of the first Poles to come publicly out as transgender.

=== Melina ===
Perfekcyjność created an unofficial gay club in her apartment, called Melina (The Den), which operated as a safe space for young queer people. She would often advertise for roommates. On 8 February 2013, a group of neo-nazis invaded Melina. The young people gathered on site and their host were severely beaten: Perfekcyjność suffered broken ribs.

=== Other activities ===
As fictional Dr Anna Torpeda, Perfekcyjność would regularly publish sex ed content.

Perfekcyjność has been the organizer of the annual International Paris Hilton Day, held in Warsaw since 2006 on the first Sunday of May. In 2010, International Paris Hilton Day was cancelled due to a plane crash with Polish politicians aboard near Smolensk. In 2013 the holiday has been discontinued due to Hilton's homophobic remarks.

== Career in entertainment ==
Since April 2016 on Polska Live! every Tuesday at 22:00 Jej Perfekcyjność hosted her own talk show Jej Perfekcyjność zaprasza na drinka (Drinks with Jej Perfekcyjność). The hour-long program hosted people from the spheres of art, politics, science, and fashion. The program was broadcast live, but its recordings could then be found in the form of podcasts on PolskaLive.pl, JejPerfekcyjnosc.pl and on the YouTube channel of Jej Perfekcyjność.

Jej Perfekcyjność toured Poland with her standup one-person show, Jej Perfekcyjność zaprasza na... (Jej Perfekcyjność invites to/for...). The topics of her performances ranged from sex life to tourism to dieting.

== Controversies ==
In June 2008, Jej Perfekcyjność became the subject of constant attacks by extreme right-wing circles, including a Catholic media group Fronda, after the Centrum Myśli Jana Pawła II awarded her the Scholarship of John Paul II. The scholarship is typically granted for social and scientific activities, promotion of the thought of John Paul II, and for the poorest students, which caused conservative personalities to critique the decision to award it to a person openly standing in defiance of the Catholic Church.

She described her stage persona as a pedophile which in turn spurred a media storm of accusations of actual acts of child sexual abuse. Perfekcyjność vehemently denied ever abusing a minor.

== Personal life ==
Jej Perfekcyjność regularly called newly-met gay men loves of her life, however, she never publicly named any committed partners. She identified as asexual.

She described her style as follows:

Every day, for safety reasons, I wear mainly [clothing] traditionally considered masculine, but wearing them, I always "add" something feminine. When I look like a man in clothes, for example, I have makeup, painted nails or neatly arranged hair. And vice versa: when performing in women's clothes, I am usually unshaven or my legs are hairy. I just like to look like a man badly disguised as a woman.

== Death ==
Perfekcyjność died of unknown causes on 23 April 2023. Her lay funeral ceremony was livestreamed on her Facebook page on 5 May. Some speculate that her death was somehow connected to her long, unknown illness; Perfekcyjność often posted pictures of her medication and Facebook updates about her struggles with health without naming her diagnosis clearly. Her exact age is also unknown – the funerary notice states her age as 18 as an inside joke.

== Legacy ==
Polish internet personality, Gracjan Roztocki, recorded an amateur song about Perfekcyjność and the physical fight she got in with a pop singer Doda. The title, Plastikowe Korale (Plastic bead necklace) alludes to the act that started the incident – Doda tore Perfekcyjność's bead necklace off while at a gay club.

Perfekcyjność was parodied in the play of Teatr Faktoria Milorda entitled Queer Casting; the character based on her was named Wasza Perfekcyjność (Your Perfection).
