= Randy D =

Vincentian broadcaster (1951–2021)

- Born: Ferrand Courtney Lawrence Dopwell; 15 May 1951; Kingstown, Saint Vincent, British Windward Islands
- Died: 14 January 2021 (aged 69); Rockies, Kingstown, Saint Vincent and the Grenadines
- Education: New York University School of Commerce; Humber College
- Occupations: Radio and television broadcaster

Ferrand Courtney Lawrence Dopwell (15 May 1951 – 14 January 2021), known by his on-air name Randy D, was a Vincentian radio and television broadcaster and live entertainment promoter.

He was considered a pioneer of radio in Saint Vincent and the Grenadines, a cultural ambassador, and a mentor to local music artists. His long-running program Vibes Caribbean provided a link for the Vincentian diaspora and helped promote local talent on an international stage.

== Early life ==
Dopwell was born on 15 May 1951. He attended the Wesleyan Methodist School in Kingstown and Kingstown Preparatory School; he completed his secondary schooling at the St. Vincent Grammar School in 1969. In grammar school, Dopwell was mainly interested in football. However, he gained his first experience with stage performance when he joined the Educational Tour Club and became a co-host for the club's events.

After working at the government Division of Customs and Excise for two years, Dopwell moved to the United States in 1971 to study at the New York University School of Commerce. He worked several part-time jobs in order to cover his expenses; he later singled out being a parking attendant at New York City's Lincoln Center as a special job, as it allowed him to watch some of the performances.

After one such performance, Dopwell had a chance meeting with an ABC producer, who introduced him to the idea of working in broadcasting. While he continued his business studies, Dopwell began saving money to enter the broadcasting course at the RCA Institute operated by RCA. However, the institute stopped accepting students in 1973 before he could apply.

Dopwell then decided to leave New York City for Canada to join his older brother, who was graduating from Humber College. Dopwell entered Humber and studied broadcasting for three years, interning at different radio stations including CFTR. He earned his radio announcer certificate in 1976.

Dopwell first began his career as a radio MC in the summer of 1974, when he returned home for a visit and hosted a show called Snap Soul.

== Career ==
Upon completing his studies in Canada, Dopwell returned to Saint Vincent and the Grenadines in 1977 and began working at Radio 705, the only radio station in the country at the time. At Radio 705, Dopwell met fellow broadcaster Earl "Capp" Stephens, and together they formed "Disco Connection", one of the country's first sound systems, which became highly influential in local entertainment.

Dopwell's involvement with Vincy Mas (the national carnival) was significant. He was asked to chair the Pre-Carnival Shows by Molly Arthur, the then-chairman of carnival, which helped him gain a large regional audience through outside broadcasts. His nickname, “Randy D – The Caribbean Music Recipe,” became synonymous with his style and impact on Caribbean radio.

In the 1980s, Dopwell continued to promote local music and culture, managing bands such as X-A-Dus and Asterisks, and working with calypsonian Alson Becket Cyrus. He collaborated with "Professor" Reginald Padmore to host makeshift live performances, and also produced a short-lived television show called De Market Place. He was instrumental in forming the Undergraduates Calypso Tent, which later became the Graduates Calypso Tent, a leading institution in Vincentian calypso for three decades. He helped Cedric Mills in starting the Connection One nightclub in 1987.

After being fired from Radio 705—an event that led to the popular protest song “We Want Randy D” by Poorsha—Dopwell moved into new roles. He took over as host of the Night Riders program from Saluche on Nice Radio. On the same station, he also ran the Morning Shift and Caribbean Linkup programs, and appeared on panel shows like "Global Highlights". He was widely recognized for his support of young artists across genres, including calypso, reggae, soul, hip hop, and jazz.

In the 2000s, Dopwell publicly opined that "entertainment was killed" by noise regulation. As few promoters could afford to purchase and soundproof their own venues, he proposed compromise between musicians and the community. This would include dialogue, curfew times, and reducing volume.

In 1989, Dopwell migrated again to Canada, to get experience in television at Rogers Cable. It was here that he began producing his show Vibes Caribbean. He later returned to Saint Vincent and the Grenadines and helped set up the programming for the first FM station, HITZ FM, which became one of the most listened-to stations in the region. In 2007, Vibes Caribbean became the first Vincentian program to be broadcast by CaribVision.

Besides music, Dopwell also used his platform for community development. He would make annual visits to homebound people and the Mental Health Centre, and provide meals for the homeless on National Heroes' Day. Dopwell was a carrier for the Saint Vincent segment of the 2010 Queen's Baton Relay. He was one of the recipients of the Carnival Development Corporation's cultural impact awards in 2017.

== Death ==
Dopwell died on 14 January 2021 of prostate cancer at his home in Kingstown. He received tributes from the National Broadcasting Corporation SVG, the New Democratic Party, The Vincentian, and the Carnival Development Corporation. He was described as a "national treasure", "icon", and "patriot" by his peers and the wider community.
