= Patrick Meijer =

Dutch comedian

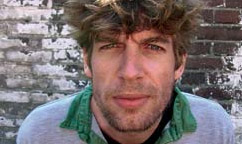
Patrick Meijer

Patrick Meijer (born 22 January 1973, Enschede) is a Dutch stand-up comedian from Twente, who won the Culture Comedy Award in 2005.
