= Joe Parker (comedian) =

South African comedian

- Notable work: Joe Parker's Comedy Express; Joe Parker's Improv Express

Comedy career
- Medium: Stand up comedian Television
- Subjects: Adult; Everyday life
- Website: www.parkerscomedy.com

Joe Parker is a South African stand-up comedian and promoter.

Joe Parker is responsible for the long running comedy show Joe Parker's Comedy Express, as well as the Improv Express devoted to improvisational theatre.

In 2008, Joe Parker opened Parker's Comedy and Jive, a dedicated venue for stand-up comedy in Johannesburg, South Africa.

== See also ==
- List of stand-up comedians
