= Loyiso Gola =

South African stand-up comedian (born 1983)

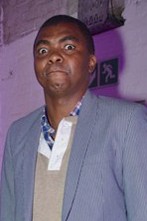
- Gola in 2011
- Born: 16 May 1986 (age 40); Gugulethu, Cape Town, South Africa
- Notable work: Late Nite News with Loyiso Gola
- Relatives: Lazola Gola (brother)

Comedy career
- Years active: 2002–present
- Medium: Stand-up, television
- Genres: Satire, parody
- Subject: South African politics

Loyiso Gola (born 16 May 1986) is a South African stand-up and TV comedian. He is the co-creator and anchor of the late-night satirical news television series Late Nite News with Loyiso Gola on e.tv and eNCA, launched in 2010, and has performed internationally.

== Early life and education ==
Gola is Xhosa, and was born on 16 May 1983 in the Cape Town township of Gugulethu. He moved away from Gugulethu at the age of 14, and attended Zonnebloem Nest Senior School in Woodstock.

Gola describes himself as "very reserved and shy" before his exposure to comedy. After performing a stand-up opening act for comedian Marc Lottering at his high school, his drama teacher introduced him to the Cape Comedy Collective at the age of 17. He subsequently job shadowed stand-up comedians from the comedy troupe for a school work experience programme and began performing on stage regularly with the group.

He matriculated in 2002, and won the Sprite Soul Comedy Tour in December of the same year, after which he relocated from Cape Town to Johannesburg.

His younger brother Lazola Gola is also a comedian.

== Career ==
His television career began with appearances on SABC 1 in the Phat Joe Live talk show in 2002, and subsequently on the SABC 1 Pure Monate Show sketch comedy series created by comedians David Kau and Kagiso Lediga in 2003.

In 2007 he became the co-host of the SABC 2 Dinner with the President talk show created by Pieter-Dirk Uys, playing the role of the black grandson of the satirist's alter ego Evita Bezuidenhout.

In 2010 he became the host of the Late Nite News satirical series he co-created with fellow comedian Kasigo Lediga, which aired on e.tv and eNCA.

Gola has performed stand-up comedy in various one-man shows on the South African comedy circuit since 2006, as well as in several international comedy festivals.

On 21 January 2022 he appeared on the BBC1 programme Would I Lie To You?, series 15, episode 3.

== Recognition ==
Gola won the Best Breakthrough Comedy Act South African Comedy Award for his 2007 one-man show Loyiso Gola for President, which coincided with the run-up to the election of a new leader of the African National Congress who would ultimately become the President of South Africa.

In 2012 Gola was named one of the Mail & Guardian 200 Young South Africans, in the Media & Film category. Men's Health describes Gola as having "divisive mass appeal" due to the openly critical nature of his humour, and being "a genuine thinker masquerading as a fool and the reluctant voice of a cynical generation".

Late Nite News was nominated for an International Emmy Award for best comedy series in 2013.

== One-man shows ==
- I'm Frank (2006)
- Loyiso Gola for President (2007)
- Coming Home (2010)
- Life & Times (2011)
- Professional Black (2012)
- Loyiso Gola Live (2013)
- State of the Nation Address (2014)

== Filmography ==
=== Film ===
- Bunny Chow Know Thyself (2006)
- Outrageous (2010)
- Copposites (2012)
- Catching Feelings (2017)

=== Television ===
- Phat Joe Live (2002)
- The Pure Monate Show (2003)
- Dinner with the President – co-host with Pieter-Dirk Uys (2007)
- Late Nite News with Loyiso Gola – host (2010-)
- Comedy Central Presents Loyiso Gola Live at Parker's (2012)
- BBC Live at The Apollo (2018)
- Would I Lie To You (2022)
- Rhod Gilbert's Growing Pains (2024)

== Awards ==
- 2002 – Winner of Sprite Soul Comedy Tour
- 2007 – South African Comedy Award – Best Breakthrough Comedy Act for Loyiso Gola for President
- 2014 – The Savanna SA Comic's Choice Award – Comic of the Year Award
