= Christian comedy =

Religious comedy subgenre

Christian comedy is a subgenre of comedy that is aimed toward a Christian audience. The performances are typically held on church grounds or at off-site, church-sponsored venues.

The material often contains Christian references, although this is not a requirement. From 2006 notable performers like Victoria Jackson, Tim Conway, Sinbad and Patricia Heaton appeared on a DVD series for the Christian market entitled, Thou Shalt Laugh.

Christian comedy is increasingly being used as an outreach with the idea that a comedy show is an effective method to bring people into church who may have never thought about coming. Christian comedy is also used as a method to renew and refresh the spirit of church members, based on the Bible passage that says laughter does a heart good, like medicine.

== Notable Christian comedians ==
- John Branyan
- Henry Cho
- Tim Conway
- John Crist
- Anthony Griffith
- Tim Hawkins
- Victoria Jackson
- Milton Jones
- Trey Kennedy
- Mark Lowry
- Taylor Mason
- Jeff Allen [Mishler]
- Dustin Nickerson
- Tyler Perry
- Chonda Pierce
- Kerri Pomarolli
- Anita Renfroe
- Brad Stine
- Tim Vine
- Mike Warnke
- Lester Barrie

== Notable Christian comedy troupes ==
- Blimey Cow

== See also ==
- Clean comedy
