= List of The Late Late Show with James Corden episodes (2023) =

- No. of episodes: 53 (and 1 special)

Release
- Original network: CBS
- Original release: January 9 – April 27, 2023

Season chronology
- ← Previous; 2022 episodes Next →

This is the list of episodes for The Late Late Show with James Corden in 2023.

== 2023 ==
=== January ===
No.	Original release date	Guest(s)	Musical/entertainment guest(s)
1145	January 9, 2023	Gwyneth Paltrow, Hilary Swank	Self Esteem
Life Advice
1146	January 10, 2023	Regina Hall, Bella Ramsey	Alec Benjamin
1147	January 11, 2023	Alexandra Daddario, Paul Dano	Jenny Zigrino
Apple Watch Hidden Features
1148	January 12, 2023	Bryan Cranston, Sigourney Weaver	Quinn XCII
1149	January 17, 2023	Danny DeVito, Lucy DeVito	Madison Cunningham
Face Your Father
1150	January 18, 2023	Angela Bassett, Brian Tyree Henry	Julia Wolf
SUPER RARE Simon & Garfunkel Performance
1151	January 19, 2023	Anna Kendrick, Michael Urie	Fabrizio Copano
1152	January 23, 2023	Kate Walsh, Storm Reid	Skip Marley
Tonight I Learned
1153	January 24, 2023	Andie MacDowell, Billy Porter	Stacey Ryan
Toddlerography
1154	January 25, 2023	George Lopez, Travis Bennett	Katie Hannigan
Celebrity Noses
1155	January 26, 2023	David Duchovny, Ron Funches	Mike Sabath & The Moongirls
Honest Headlines
1156	January 30, 2023	Emma Roberts, Paul Walter Hauser	Blake Rose
Like Us On...
1157	January 31, 2023	Sally Field, Scott Caan	Måneskin
Audience Q&A

=== February ===
No.	Original release date	Guest(s)	Musical/entertainment guest(s)
1158	February 1, 2023	Dave Bautista, Jenny Slate	Stephen Sanchez with Em Beihold
1159	February 2, 2023	Trevor Noah, Shania Twain	Jono Zalay
Side Effects May Include
1160	February 6, 2023	Michael Douglas, Guillermo del Toro	Mike Posner and Salem Ilese
1161	February 7, 2023	Jay Ellis, Kirby Howell-Baptiste	Elon Gold
Emoji News
1162	February 8, 2023	Adam Pally, Gordon Ramsay	Margo Price featuring Sharon Van Etten
1163	February 9, 2023	O'Shea Jackson Jr., Meagan Good	N/A
Super Bowl Snackdown
1164	February 13, 2023	Quinta Brunson, Ashton Kutcher, Cara Delevingne	N/A
Cell Phone Profile
1165	February 14, 2023	Alison Brie, Dave Franco	Lauren Spencer-Smith
Shock Therapy Quiz
1166	February 15, 2023	Natasha Lyonne, Rian Johnson	Dylan Adler
Spot the Liars
1167	February 16, 2023	Niall Horan, Orlando Bloom	N/A
Gordon Ramsay Grand Opening
1168	February 27, 2023	Wanda Sykes, Joel McHale	Tomorrow X Together
Good Cop/Bad Cop
1169	February 28, 2023	Jamie Lee Curtis, Nate Bargatze	The Scarlet Opera
Musical Pirates on the High Seas

=== March ===
No.	Original release date	Guest(s)	Musical/entertainment guest(s)
1170	March 1, 2023	Ke Huy Quan, Sheryl Lee Ralph	N/A
Guiding James Through the Multiverse
1171	March 2, 2023	Colin Farrell, Brendan Gleeson	Chris Martin
1172	March 6, 2023	Michael B. Jordan, Tessa Thompson, Jonathan Majors	N/A
Late Late LIVE Tinder
1173	March 7, 2023	Hong Chau, Rob Corddry	Stephen Sanchez
Breaking a Guinness World Record, There's Been A Murder During the Show!
1174	March 8, 2023	Matthew Rhys, Lisa Ann Walter	Greg Barris
1175	March 9, 2023	Milo Ventimiglia, Madelyn Cline	Tim Young
Were You Paying Attention
1176	March 13, 2023	Sam Claflin, Sarah Michelle Gellar	N/A
Dogs in Sunglasses
1177	March 14, 2023	Josh Gad, Samara Weaving	Ellie Goulding
Carpool Karaoke with Bad Bunny
1178	March 15, 2023	Lily Tomlin, Sienna Miller, Kit Harington	Dan Levy
1179	March 20, 2023	Bob Odenkirk, Melanie Lynskey	Tori Kelly
1180	March 21, 2023	Brendan Hunt, Nicole Byer	Orion Levine
1181	March 22, 2023	Kerry Washington, Delroy Lindo	N/A
1182	March 27, 2023	Julie Bowen, Zach Braff	Morvin Splaversby
Carpool Karaoke with Lil Nas X
1183	March 28, 2023	Owen Wilson, Jeff Goldblum	Lior Suchard
1184	March 29, 2023	Chris Pine, Hugh Grant	Jimmie Allen
Spill Your Guts or Fill Your Guts
1185	March 30, 2023	Kevin Bacon, Kyra Sedgwick	Dustin Nickerson

=== April ===
No.	Original release date	Guest(s)	Musical/entertainment guest(s)
1186	April 10, 2023	Allison Janney, Bryan Cranston, Brett Goldstein	SG Lewis with Tove Lo
1187	April 11, 2023	Kate Hudson, Oliver Hudson	Inhaler
Take a Break
1188	April 12, 2023	Ben Schwartz, Betty Gilpin, Ken Jeong	Reggie Watts
1189	April 13, 2023	Ben Affleck, Chris Messina	N/A
1190	April 17, 2023	Seth Meyers	SIX the Musical
Seth Meyers, Please Hire Us
1191	April 18, 2023	Sharon Stone, Jack Whitehall	N/A
BLACKPINK Carpool Karaoke
1192	April 19, 2023	Jennifer Garner	Reggie Watts
Celebrity Noses
1193	April 20, 2023	Billy Porter, Lisa Kudrow	Billy Porter
Carpool Karaoke
1194	April 24, 2023	Gal Gadot, Ray Romano	N/A
Lifetime Achievement Award
1195	April 25, 2023	Billie Eilish, Natalie Portman	N/A
1196	April 26, 2023	Mila Kunis, Patrick Stewart & Chris Martin	N/A
Special	April 27, 2023	Tom Cruise, Adele	N/A
The Last Last Late Late Show Carpool Karaoke Special
1197	April 27, 2023	Harry Styles, Will Ferrell	N/A
Special appearances by Jimmy Kimmel, Stephen Colbert, Jimmy Fallon, Seth Meyers, David Letterman, and Trevor Noah
