= List of The Late Late Show with James Corden episodes (2022) =

- No. of episodes: 138

Release
- Original network: CBS
- Original release: January 3 – December 15, 2022

Season chronology
- ← Previous; 2021 episodes Next → 2023 episodes

This is the list of episodes for The Late Late Show with James Corden in 2022.

== 2022 ==
=== January ===
| No. | Original release date | Guest(s) | Musical/entertainment guest(s) |
|---|---|---|---|
| 1006 | January 3, 2022 | Sophia Bush, Aaron Sorkin | Japanese Breakfast |
Tribute To Betty White
| 1007 | January 4, 2022 | Lily Collins, William Jackson Harper | St. Vincent |
| 1008 | January 5, 2022 | Jessica Chastain, Penélope Cruz | Andrew Sleighter |
| 1009 | January 18, 2022 | Adam Devine, Neve Campbell | Japanese Breakfast |
| 1010 | January 19, 2022 | Dakota Johnson, Josh Gad | Hippo Campus |
Happy Retirement Josh Gad
| 1011 | January 20, 2022 | Ed Helms, Rachel Brosnahan | Samm Henshaw |
Louis Waymouth Enters French Open, SlashD
| 1012 | January 24, 2022 | David Arquette, Nick Thune | Jackie Kashian |
Tribute To Meat Loaf
| 1013 | January 25, 2022 | Christina Ricci, Jeremy O. Harris | Everybody's Talking About Jamie |
| 1014 | January 26, 2022 | Daveed Diggs, Sydney Sweeney | Joy Crookes |
Tonight I Learned
| 1015 | January 27, 2022 | Jared Leto, David Cross | N/A |
Dogs In Sunglasses
| 1016 | January 31, 2022 | Brooklyn Beckham, Patrick Wilson | Gunna |

=== February ===
| No. | Original release date | Guest(s) | Musical/entertainment guest(s) |
|---|---|---|---|
| 1017 | February 1, 2022 | Johnny Knoxville, Nick Offerman | Tolliver |
Jackass Route To The Show
| 1018 | February 2, 2022 | Annette Bening, Dave Franco | The Linda Lindas |
| 1019 | February 3, 2022 | Kenneth Branagh, Lily James, Nicki Minaj | N/A |
Nicki Minaj's Late Late Show
| 1020 | February 14, 2022 | Jenny Slate, Murray Bartlett, Von Miller | Teddy Swims |
Cupid Happier & Healthier Than Ever
| 1021 | February 15, 2022 | Anna Chlumsky, Charlie Day | Bastille |
Like Us On...
| 1022 | February 16, 2022 | Aaron Donald, Adam McKay, Rebecca Hall | N/A |
| 1023 | February 17, 2022 | Ike Barinholtz, Chloe Kim | Parcels |
Malcolm & Margaret Corden Visit Super Bowl LVI, Taller Or Shorter
| 1024 | February 21, 2022 | Haley Bennett, Sam Richardson | Sam Morril |
Bachelorette Party
| 1025 | February 22, 2022 | Shaun White, Whitney Cummings | Natalie Hemby |
| 1026 | February 23, 2022 | Dave Grohl, Hilary Duff | Carlie Hanson |
James That Tune
| 1027 | February 24, 2022 | Nathan Chen, Will Arnett | Machine Gun Kelly featuring Willow Smith |
Nuzzle This!
| 1028 | February 28, 2022 | Maggie Gyllenhaal, Cynthia Erivo | Kimberly Clark |
Duet To It

=== March ===
| No. | Original release date | Guest(s) | Musical/entertainment guest(s) |
|---|---|---|---|
| 1029 | March 1, 2022 | Pamela Adlon, Taika Waititi | Pinegrove |
Celebrity Noses
| 1030 | March 2, 2022 | Colin Farrell, Patrick Stewart | Nick Cave |
Surprise Office Makeover
| 1031 | March 3, 2022 | Camila Cabello, Nathan Lane | Camila Cabello |
| 1032 | March 7, 2022 | Lakeith Stanfield, Ryan Tedder | OneRepublic |
Apple Watch Hidden Features
| 1033 | March 8, 2022 | Jennifer Garner, Greg Kinnear | 5 Seconds of Summer |
| 1034 | March 9, 2022 | Bob Odenkirk, Edi Patterson | Walk the Moon |
Where's Your TED At?
| 1035 | March 10, 2022 | Adam Scott, Joachim Trier | Maria Bamford |
Trash Talk School
| 1036 | March 14, 2022 | Venus Williams, Zach Braff | Akeem Woods |
Tennis Target Practice
| 1037 | March 15, 2022 | James Marsden, Minnie Driver | Gayle |
Honest Headlines
| 1038 | March 16, 2022 | Rosario Dawson, John Cameron Mitchell | Duran Duran |
| 1039 | March 21, 2022 | Lizzo, Gabrielle Union | Pillow Queens |
80s Vs. Today Dance Bop Riff-Off
| 1040 | March 22, 2022 | Olivia Rodrigo, Renate Reinsve | Cirque du Soleil's OVO |
Drew Carey Plays Switcheroo
| 1041 | March 23, 2022 | Sandra Bullock, Channing Tatum | Chris Laker |
| 1042 | March 28, 2022 | Rose McIver, Tony Hawk | Yungblud |
We Don't Talk About Jada, America Watts Talent, James Tribute To Taylor Hawkins
| 1043 | March 29, 2022 | Jake Johnson, Jay Hernandez | N/A |
| 1044 | March 30, 2022 | David Duchovny, Pablo Schreiber | Christina Perri |
Record Collection
| 1045 | March 31, 2022 | Maria Bakalova, Stephen Merchant | Wet Leg |

=== April ===
| No. | Original release date | Guest(s) | Musical/entertainment guest(s) |
|---|---|---|---|
| 1046 | April 4, 2022 | Lisa Kudrow, Mira Sorvino | Jimmie Allen |
James Wanna See It
| 1047 | April 5, 2022 | Jamie Lee Curtis, Chris Pine | N/A |
| 1048 | April 6, 2022 | Mark Wahlberg, Judy Greer | Sigrid |
Nicki Minaj Carpool Karaoke
| 1049 | April 18, 2022 | Daisy Edgar-Jones, Pedro Pascal | Toni Cornell |
Camila Cabello Carpool Karaoke
| 1050 | April 19, 2022 | Elle Fanning, Anthony Ramos | Upsahl |
Like Us On...
| 1051 | April 20, 2022 | Pete Holmes, Lucy Boynton | Jay Jurden |
| 1052 | April 21, 2022 | Nicolas Cage, Aaron Paul, Professor Robert Winston | N/A |
| 1053 | April 25, 2022 | Henry Winkler, Wyatt Russell | Lara Beitz |
Henry Winkler Is The Next Batman
| 1054 | April 26, 2022 | Ray Romano, Brooklyn Decker | Joy Downer |
Honest Headlines
| 1055 | April 27, 2022 | Jane Fonda, Lily Tomlin | Pete Yorn |
Life Advice
| 1056 | April 28, 2022 | Molly Shannon, Josh Groban | Giveon |
James Corden Announcement On Leaving Late Late Show In 2023, New Netflix Show Ideas

=== May ===
| No. | Original release date | Guest(s) | Musical/entertainment guest(s) |
|---|---|---|---|
| 1057 | May 2, 2022 | Dakota Fanning, Jamie Bell | T-Pain |
Late Late Live Tinder
| 1058 | May 3, 2022 | Tom Cruise, Monica Barbaro | Teddy Swims |
Tom Cruise Terrifies James in Top Gun Fighter Jet
| 1059 | May 4, 2022 | Colin Hanks, Mackenzie Davis | N/A |
Mom Face-Off
| 1060 | May 5, 2022 | Benedict Cumberbatch, Elizabeth Olsen | Tom Walker |
Warming Up Margaritas
| 1061 | May 9, 2022 | Anthony Anderson, Michael Bublé | Michael Bublé |
Dogs In Sunglasses
| 1062 | May 10, 2022 | Rebel Wilson, Eugenio Derbez | Joe Zimmerman |
Late Late Prom King
| 1063 | May 11, 2022 | Jessica Biel, David Spade | Bastille |
Something Personal
| 1064 | May 12, 2022 | Niecy Nash, Paul W. Downs | The Smashing Pumpkins |
| 1065 | May 16, 2022 | Ciara, Jenna Dewan | Steven Rogers |
James Wanna See It
| 1066 | May 17, 2022 | Hannah Einbinder, Lennon Parham | Hadestown |
| 1067 | May 18, 2022 | Sheryl Crow, Rhea Seehorn | Sheryl Crow |
Audience Q&A
| 1068 | May 19, 2022 | Jean Smart, Joshua Jackson | DNCE |
Take A Break
| 1069 | May 23, 2022 | Kaley Cuoco, Glen Powell | Bloc Party |
Top Gun Day
| 1070 | May 24, 2022 | Patricia Arquette, Ben Schwartz | Ophira Eisenberg |
Ben Schwartz Most Frequent Late Late Show Guest
| 1071 | May 25, 2022 | Amanda Peet, Brett Gelman | N/A |
Celebrity Noses
| 1072 | May 26, 2022 | Terry Crews, June Diane Raphael | Amos Lee |

=== June ===
| No. | Original release date | Guest(s) | Musical/entertainment guest(s) |
|---|---|---|---|
| 1073 | June 6, 2022 | Juliette Lewis, Viggo Mortensen | Benson Boone |
Honest Headlines
| 1074 | June 7, 2022 | Patrick Schwarzenegger, Tig Notaro | Dustin Nickerson |
Apple Watch Hidden Features
| 1075 | June 8, 2022 | Annette Bening, Ewan McGregor | The Chainsmokers |
| 1076 | June 9, 2022 | Rainn Wilson, Adria Arjona | Mark Owen |
Top Gun 3: Bottom Gun
| 1077 | June 13, 2022 | Melissa McCarthy, Ben Falcone | Rufus Wainwright |
| 1078 | June 14, 2022 | Chrissy Teigen, Rose Byrne | Kat Radley |
Honest Headlines
| 1079 | June 15, 2022 | President Bill Clinton | OneRepublic |
Ask A President
| 1080 | June 16, 2022 | RuPaul Charles, Vanessa Bayer | Bishop Briggs |
Drag Queen Jubilee
| 1081 | June 20, 2022 | Lil Dicky, Giancarlo Esposito | Betty Who |
Movie Review
| 1082 | June 21, 2022 | Constance Wu, Zoë Chao | Bright Eyes |
Honest Headlines, Puff The Magic Dragon
| 1083 | June 22, 2022 | Chris Pratt, Taylor Kitsch | James Bay |
| 1084 | June 23, 2022 | Austin Butler, Jeff Goldblum | Zac Brown Band |
| 1085 | June 27, 2022 | Billie Eilish, David Harbour | TBA |
Broadcast from London, Carpool Karaoke, Spill The Tea
| 1086 | June 28, 2022 | Vin Diesel, Ed Sheeran | Maisie Peters |
Broadcast from London, Scamming LLS Merchandise, Ex-English Football Stars at Shakespeare's Globe
| 1087 | June 29, 2022 | John Boyega, Sam Smith, Minnie Driver, Lior Suchard | Cat Burns and Sam Smith |
Broadcast from London, Big Ben Visit
| 1088 | June 30, 2022 | Jamie Dornan, Tessa Thompson | N/A |
Broadcast from London, Take A Break: White House Edition

=== August ===
| No. | Original release date | Guest(s) | Musical/entertainment guest(s) |
|---|---|---|---|
| 1089 | August 22, 2022 | Kevin Hart, Alison Brie | N/A |
Truth Or Eat It!
| 1090 | August 23, 2022 | Jason Momoa, Kristen Bell | Meghan Trainor featuring Teddy Swims |
Cell Phone Profile
| 1091 | August 24, 2022 | Connie Britton, Aasif Mandvi | blackbear |
Summer 2022 Recap
| 1092 | August 25, 2022 | Regina Hall, Sterling K. Brown | Moulin Rouge! |
Shock Friendship Quiz
| 1093 | August 29, 2022 | Heidi Klum, David LaChapelle | Ian Karmel |
David LaChapelle Recreation Contest
| 1094 | August 30, 2022 | Guy Fieri, Kirby Howell-Baptiste | Sabrina Carpenter |
Stealing Guy's Look
| 1095 | August 31, 2022 | Cristin Milioti, Aisha Tyler | Franz Ferdinand |
James & Jason Momoa Summer Montage

=== September ===
| No. | Original release date | Guest(s) | Musical/entertainment guest(s) |
|---|---|---|---|
| 1096 | September 1, 2022 | Terry Crews, Ken Jeong | Amanda Shires |
Ian Karmel 90 Second Bachelor Party
| 1097 | September 6, 2022 | Luke Evans, Dr. Phil | The Interrupters |
Family Therapy
| 1098 | September 7, 2022 | Secretary Pete Buttigieg, Simone Biles | Jessie Baylin |
| 1099 | September 8, 2022 | Kris Jenner, Kylie Jenner | Jeff Scheen |
Lie Detector
| 1100 | September 12, 2022 | Bradley Whitford, Camila Mendes | Tai Verdes |
"Rings Of Power" Intro
| 1101 | September 13, 2022 | Adrien Brody, Louis Tomlinson | Louis Tomlinson |
Apple Watch Hidden Features
| 1102 | September 14, 2022 | Kim Kardashian, Edward Enninful | Fontaines D.C. |
| 1103 | September 15, 2022 | Elisabeth Moss, Diego Luna | Caitlin Peluffo |
| 1104 | September 19, 2022 | Emily Deschanel, Keegan-Michael Key | Black Eyed Peas |
Where's Your TED At?
| 1105 | September 20, 2022 | Josh Duhamel, Judy Greer | Nina Nesbitt |
| 1106 | September 21, 2022 | Tyra Banks, Yvonne Orji | David Blaine |
The Targashians
| 1107 | September 22, 2022 | Paddy Considine, Taran Killam | Sean Jordan |
Celebrity Noses
| 1108 | September 26, 2022 | Christoph Waltz, Jurnee Smollett | Joy Crookes |
Star Wars Prop Designer
| 1109 | September 27, 2022 | Luke Macfarlane, Charli D'Amelio | Kelsea Ballerini |
| 1110 | September 28, 2022 | Mayim Bialik, Max Greenfield | Jamali Maddix |
Renting Out Green Room
| 1111 | September 29, 2022 | Billy Eichner, Maya Hawke | Mt. Joy |

=== October ===
| No. | Original release date | Guest(s) | Musical/entertainment guest(s) |
|---|---|---|---|
| 1112 | October 3, 2022 | Rosie O'Donnell, Marcus Mumford, Utkarsh Ambudkar | Marcus Mumford |
| 1113 | October 4, 2022 | Mila Kunis, Clea DuVall | Oklahoma! |
Mila Kunis! The Musical, Like Us On...
| 1114 | October 5, 2022 | Cedric the Entertainer, Lena Dunham | OneRepublic |
Cedric The Entertainer Wants To Be Entertained
| 1115 | October 6, 2022 | Jimmy Smits, Zach Woods | Greg Stone |
| 1116 | October 10, 2022 | Marlon Wayans, Marc Maron | Amos Lee |
Late Late Live Tinder
| 1117 | October 11, 2022 | Nick Kroll, Florence Welch | Florence and the Machine |
James Wanna See It
| 1118 | October 12, 2022 | Eddie Redmayne, Grace Van Patten | Gabriels |
Audience Q&A
| 1119 | October 13, 2022 | Jamie Lee Curtis, Jason Blum | Zach Zimmerman |
| 1120 | October 24, 2022 | Billie Lourd, Tyler James Williams | Andrea Jin |
| 1121 | October 25, 2022 | Billy Porter, Chelsea Handler | Andy Grammer |
Life Advise
| 1122 | October 26, 2022 | Josh Gad, Fred Armisen | The Big Pink |
Cameraman's Wife Is A Witch
| 1123 | October 27, 2022 | Michaela Coel, Geena Davis, Yuval Noah Harari | N/A |
Never-Ending Kit Kats, Halloween Horror Nights
| 1124 | October 31, 2022 | Kerry Washington, Paul Feig | Rosa Linn |
The Great Halloween Bake-Off

=== November ===
| No. | Original release date | Guest(s) | Musical/entertainment guest(s) |
|---|---|---|---|
| 1125 | November 1, 2022 | Will Arnett, Melia Kreiling | Tyga |
Fired From "Top Gun" & "Scarface"
| 1126 | November 2, 2022 | Alicia Vikander, Chris O'Dowd | Tommy McLain |
| 1127 | November 3, 2022 | Kal Penn, Melissa Fumero | N/A |
Honest Headlines
| 1128 | November 14, 2022 | Emily Blunt, Jonathan Majors, Murray Bartlett | N/A |
Cell Phone Profile
| 1129 | November 15, 2022 | Allison Janney, Joe Jonas | Pat Benatar and Neil Giraldo |
The Joe Joe Show With Joe Jonas
| 1130 | November 16, 2022 | Idina Menzel, James Marsden | Beth Orton |
Sing Or Swing
| 1131 | November 17, 2022 | Tracee Ellis Ross, Sosie Bacon | Erica Spera |
| 1132 | November 21, 2022 | Amy Adams, Maya Rudolph | Franz Ferdinand |
Shock Therapy Quiz
| N–A | N/A | Thomas Lennon, Kirby Howell-Baptiste | Bazzi |
Show and guests announced via press release. Likely taped but never aired; replaced at last minute with rerun of August 30 episode.
| 1133 | November 23, 2022 | Linda Cardellini, Neal Brennan | Gianmarco Soresi |
Corden refers to this episode as 1134 when talking to Gianmarco Soresi backstage.
| 1134 | November 29, 2022 | Chloë Grace Moretz, Glen Powell | Reneé Rapp |
| 1135 | November 30, 2022 | Beth Behrs, Justin Long | Avril Lavigne and Yungblud |

=== December ===
| No. | Original release date | Guest(s) | Musical/entertainment guest(s) |
|---|---|---|---|
| 1136 | December 1, 2022 | David Harbour, Sarah Hyland | Dan Black |
Christmas Crisis
| 1137 | December 5, 2022 | Kenan Thompson, Annaleigh Ashford | Bazzi |
Kenan Thompson Puts The JINGLE In 'Jingle Bells'
| 1138 | December 6, 2022 | Noah Centineo, Max Thieriot | Syncopated Ladies |
Noah Centineo Slides Into Any Christmas Song
| 1139 | December 7, 2022 | Josh Lucas, Kerry Condon | Jordan Jensen |
Late Late LIVE Tinder
| 1140 | December 8, 2022 | Olivia Colman, Sam Mendes, Micheal Ward | N/A |
Audience Marriage Proposal
| 1141 | December 12, 2022 | Melissa McCarthy, Josh Groban | N/A |
Santa Turf Wars
| 1142 | December 13, 2022 | Zoe Saldaña, Kumail Nanjiani | Talk |
2022 Recap
| 1143 | December 14, 2022 | Haley Lu Richardson, Michael McIntyre | Tegan and Sara |
Avatar Ed
| 1144 | December 15, 2022 | Margot Robbie, Jean Smart | N/A |
Mr. Uekusa Surprise, Zoe Saldaña Is Crazy About Anything Blue
