= Mabrey =

Mabrey is a surname. Notable people with the surname include:

- Freight Mabrey (born 1963), American podcast personality
- Marina Mabrey (born 1996), American basketball player
- Sunny Mabrey (born 1975), American actress and model
- Vicki Mabrey (born 1956), American television correspondent
