= Electric Bloom =

American television series

- Genre: Musical; Comedy
- Created by: Alex Fox, Eric Friedman, and Rachel Lewis
- Showrunner: Eric Friedman
- Starring: Lumi Pollack; Carmen Sanchez; Ruby Marino; Nathaniel Buescher
- Theme music composer: Diane Warren
- Opening theme: "Wherever We Go, We Go Together" by Lumi Pollack, Carmen Sanchez, and Ruby Marino
- Composers: Diane Warren; Kotomi; Chad Fischer
- Country of origin: United States
- Original language: English
- No. of seasons: 1
- No. of episodes: 17

Production
- Executive producers: Eric Friedman; Alex Fox and Rachel Lewis; Diane Warren; Bahareh Batmang; Jody Margolin Hahn
- Producers: Lacey Dyer and Julia Layton; Zack Lowenstein
- Cinematography: Chuck Ozeas; Hisham Abed
- Editor: Brady Heck
- Camera setup: Multi-camera
- Running time: 21–27 minutes
- Production companies: Echo and Cici Productions; Fox and Lewis; Diane Warren + Bahareh Batmang; Kenwood TV Productions

Original release
- Network: Disney Channel
- Release: July 10 – October 26, 2025

Related
- Electric Bloom: Season 1 (Original Soundtrack)

Electric Bloom is an American musical comedy television series created by Alex Fox, Eric Friedman, and Rachel Lewis that aired on Disney Channel from July 10 to October 26, 2025. The series stars Lumi Pollack, Carmen Sanchez, Ruby Marino, and Nathaniel Buescher.

== Premise ==
A famous pop music group called "Electric Bloom" consists of Posey Parker, Jade Castillo, and Tulip Aoki where they named their group over the fact that they have flower-based names. Electric Bloom reflects on their story on how they became the biggest band in the world on their "Ask Us Anything" livestream, starting from the day they met in 9th grade at Edison County High School and started as a school band.

== Cast ==
=== Main ===
- Lumi Pollack as Posey Parker, the Jewish-American lead vocalist and guitarist of Electric Bloom. Her full name is Posey Penelope Parker as revealed in the first episode "How It Started." Posey is a driven and disciplined student, who thrives on schedules and rules. She is also kind, obedient, and is at times prone to anxiety. Her wardrobe consists mostly of blouses and vests, skirts, Mary Janes, and ruffled socks. In the present day segment, Posey's hair is longer and partially pulled into a high ponytail. The episode "How We Defeated a Jingle Bell Bully" reveals that Posey celebrates Hannukah as she greeted the "Ask Us Anything" viewers by quoting "Happy Hannukah".
- Carmen Sanchez as Jade Castillo, the Mexican-American keyboardist of Electric Bloom. Jade is rebellious and loud but kindhearted. In the episode "How We Found Howie," it is revealed that she lost her Abuelo Howie (nicknamed "Owie" as Jade didn't know all the Spanish words at the time) and was still hurting from it. Her wardrobe is very '90s-inspired and tomboyish while sporting shoulder length wavy red hair. In the present day segment, Jade's red hair is long and perfectly straight and she goes more glamorous with makeup and lots of sparkles.
- Ruby Marino as Tulip Aoki, the Japanese-American DJ of Electric Bloom and the tallest of the group who was originally home-schooled until she started attending Edison County High School. Everything about public school was new and exciting to Tulip. She is quirky, eclectic, offbeat and funny. Most of her wardrobe is filled with color, patterns, and themes, usually with a subtle or overt nod to flowers while her black hair is either down or in two braids. In the present day segment, Tulip takes on a more typical Japanese look with baby pink space buns and bangs, eye gems, and flared jumper over an off-shoulder blouse. Her full name is Tulip Juniper Aoki as revealed in the episode "How We Defeated a Jingle Bell Bully" and had a history with Shelly LeBrock's cousin Michelley.
- Nathaniel Buescher as Lucas Jasper, a friend and supporter of Electric Bloom that the girls like. Lucas is often referred to by his first and last name. He is highly easygoing, a little oblivious, and behaves as a typical cool high school guy. Lucas also is revealed to babysit a young girl named Greta who adores Electric Bloom. Lucas normally wears hoodies, T-shirts, and khakis, and has golden tipped curly hair. The end of the episode "How We Got Crushed" revealed that the present day Lucas is dating one of the Electric Bloom members. The two-part season finale would reveal that it was Posey after an assortment of misunderstandings.

=== Recurring ===
- DaJuan Johnson as Principal Jeffers, the principal of Edison County High School who gets annoyed with Jade's antics, is a fan of theater, and tends to misuse some words. The episode "How We (Sorta) Got Our First Big Break: Part One" revealed that his first name is Jeff.
- Clayton Thomas as Mr. B, the music teacher of Edison County High School
- J'Adore Elizabeth as Shelly Sharp, an ex-best friend/singing partner of Posey who branched off from her and has since become Electric Bloom's rival
- Trisha Macaden as Shelly LeBrock, an Indian-American girl and the new singing partner of Shelly Sharp where they form The Two Shellys and have become Electric Bloom's rivals
- Luke Busey as The Vince, an athletic friend of Electric Bloom and Lucas who fixes things
- Van Brunelle as Dante, Jade's boyfriend who later befriended Lucas and The Vince

=== Notable guest stars ===
- Dara Reneé as herself, she met Electric Bloom where she was doing a photoshoot next door from them
- Maia Kealoha as Kaia, Tulip's stepsister who is a child prodigy attending college
- Sofia Carson as herself, she met Electric Bloom at Stephanie Bradley's record company and advised them not to lose the special thing they have

== Episodes ==
No.	Title	Directed by	Written by	Original release date	Prod. code	U.S. viewers (millions)
1	"How It Started"	Jody Margolin Hahn	Alex Fox, Eric Friedman, and Rachel Lewis	July 10, 2025	101	0.14
After a concert in New York, Electric Bloom starts up an "Ask Us Anything" livestream and their first question is how they first met. Flashing back to three years ago, Posey and her old best friend Shelly Sharp were planning to enter the upcoming "Battle of the Bands" at Edison County High School held by the music teacher Mr. B, but Shelly gets paired with Shelly LeBrock for a science project while Posey has to work with the troublemaking Jade and the optimistic Tulip. The girls discover they are talented in music and bond quickly, and Posey is devastated when Shelly S. decides to ditch her to become popular with Shelly L. in the show. A sneak-in results in the girls getting detention from Principal Jeffers, but the girls break out and perform in the show. Although the two Shellys win first prize, the three girls become true best friends. Featured songs: "Wherever We Go, We Go Together", "My Beat, My Drum" Guest stars: J'Adore Elizabeth as Shelly Sharp, Trisha Macaden as Shelly LeBrock, DaJuan Johnson as Principal Jeffers, Santina Muha as Ms. Mecklenberg, Ellen Ratner as Barbara
2	"How It Almost Ended"	Jody Margolin Hahn	Alex Fox, Eric Friedman, and Rachel Lewis	July 10, 2025	102	0.11
Electric Bloom shares the story on "Ask Us Anything" of how they continued after battle of the bands; Tulip decides they should be a permanent band and book their first gig. However, none of the three girls ideas work with one another such as Posey's schedules and Tulip's creepy dolls, causing a rift amongst them. Posey soon realizes their differences make them special and use them to create a new song, and after escaping Posey's dolls, they come up with the name "Electric Bloom" from their floral-themed names and their bonds feeling like electricity. They perform their first gig at the underground subway and get a standing ovation. Featured song: "No Limits" Guest stars: J'Adore Elizabeth as Shelly Sharp, Trisha Macaden as Shelly LeBrock, Ellen Ratner as Barbara
3	"How We Rocked Homecoming"	Jody Margolin Hahn	Alex Fox, Eric Friedman, and Rachel Lewis	July 18, 2025	103	0.09
Electric Bloom on their "Ask Us Anything" talk about the time they won the spot to sing at the Homecoming's pep rally on Pajama Day. Unfortunately, Posey did a victory dance in front of Shelly Sharp at her locker. Feeling guilty about it, Posey tries to make amends with Shelly by having her and Shelly LeBrock sing backup, though this doesn't go well at their rehearsal as they try to steal the gig. Eventually, Posey learns that there will be some people that will not like her as she enlists The Vince and the school orchestra to help Electric Bloom with the remix of their song. Featured song: "Honeybees Fight Song" Guest stars: Luke Busey as The Vince, J'Adore Elizabeth as Shelly Sharp, Trisha Macaden as Shelly LeBrock, DaJuan Johnson as Principal Jeffers, Elena Campbell-Martinez as Doña Esmeralda
4	"How We Got Crushed"	Jody Margolin Hahn	Ron Rappaport	July 18, 2025	104	0.06
Electric Bloom mentions on their "Ask Us Anything" about the time when a school play is planned at Edison County High School. Posey, Jade, and Tulip audition for parts and find that Lucas Jasper has gotten the part as they use their roles to compete for his affection. Meanwhile, The Vince convinces Mr. B to let Principal Jeffers partake in the school play where Principal Jeffers is cast as the narrator. Eventually, the girls learn not to let a boy come in between them. Back in the present, Electric Bloom mentions what "The One" is dedicated to as they perform it in their dressing room after enlisting Tony and his fellow road crew to do some rearranging. Afterwards, Lucas arrives where he compliments their song and has arrived to take his girlfriend out leaving it ambiguous on which girl he is talking about. Featured song: "The One" Guest stars: Luke Busey as The Vince, DaJuan Johnson as Principal Jeffers, Clayton Thomas as Mr. B, Audrey Grace Marshall as Janine
5	"How We Made a Tiny Mistake"	Danielle Fishel	Jess Pineda	July 25, 2025	105	0.13
Taking a break from their tour to have a sleepover at Tulip's house, Electric Bloom talk about awaiting to see if they will be nominated at the Music Icon Awards. While they wait, they talk about the time when they made a music video and worked on getting a lot of likes as the Two Shellys also get more likes for their videos. In addition, Lucas is babysitting Tulip's neighbor Greta who is going to be having a birthday party and wants Electric Bloom to perform. This conflicts with their nomination at the Tiny Awards hosted by Billy Dexter. With Lucas stalling as long as possible, Electric Bloom gets their award which is very tiny. They return to Greta's house and perform for her while giving her a flower crown. Back in the present, Electric Bloom then concludes that story by stating that they started a tradition of giving random fans a flower crown. Featured song: "One Little Spark" Guest stars: J'Adore Elizabeth as Shelly Sharp, Trisha Macaden as Shelly LeBrock, Luke Busey as The Vince, Ellen Ratner as Barbara, Serenity Grace Russell as Greta, John Milhiser as Billy Dexter (Host)
6	"How We Found Howie"	Danielle Fishel	Lacey Dyer and Julia Layton	July 25, 2025	106	0.11
Still waiting for the news on if they will be nominated at the Music Icon Awards, Electric Bloom continues their "Ask Us Anything" by talking about the time that they got on Jade's favorite podcast called "Spill the Deetz" which is hosted by Maggie Deetz. Though Posey and Tulip find that Jade is not interested with the date in question and refuses to explain why. Posey and Tulip go through Jade's garbage and find information about someone named Howie. When they managed to invite Howie to the sight of the podcast, Howie is revealed to be Jade's ex-boyfriend and their argument impresses Maggie. When Posey and Tulip go after Jade, they find that she found out what they did and pranked them with Howie being her old camp friend Amir. Jade finally comes clean by mentioning that the date in question revolved around the loss of her grandfather she called "Owie" as she couldn't pronounce "abuelo" at the time and that he would've been proud of her if he was still alive. Back in the present, Electric Bloom sees the nominations and find that they are among them. Guest stars: Symera Jackson as Maggie Deetz, Afsheen M. Alijani as Howie/Amir
7	"How to (Not) Make a Music Video"	Danielle Fishel	Erica Eastrich	August 1, 2025	108	0.09
While preparing for a photo shoot, Electric Bloom mention on their "Ask Us Anything" about the time when Maggie Deetz planned to hook them up with her boyfriend Malcolm who is still in high school, is taking a college class, and almost made a music video for Beyoncé. Maggie also states that Malcolm will need to know who the leader of Electric Bloom is. Posey and Jade argue over each one claiming to be a leader. Not having been asked once, Tulip's personality of "Trixie" emerges and takes control of Electric Bloom. Trixie's demands prove to be too much for Posey and Jade and even causes Malcolm to walk out. Regressing back to her true personality, Tulip admits that neither Posey and Jade asked her about being a leader. They decide that Electric Bloom shouldn't have a leader. As for the music video, they get help from Lucas in light of his computer project. In the final scene after Posey left, Lucas has made a computer proposal for Posey. Featured song: "Unbreakable" Guest stars: Symera Jackson as Maggie Deetz, Israel Johnson as Malcolm
8	"How We Danced the Night Away"	Jody Margolin Hahn	Alex Fox, Eric Friedman, and Rachel Lewis	August 1, 2025	109	0.05
Still waiting for their photo shoot, Electric Bloom answer a question on their "Ask Us Anything" regarding prom. This causes them to bring up a memory of when an assortment of promposals are being asked out as Posey, Jade, and Tulip stick to their pact to not let a boy come in between them. Lucas gets information from The Vince on how to do a better promposal for Posey. This gets overheard by a student named Sunny at The Buzzy who relates this information to Posey, though Posey lets Lucas down gently that she will be going with her friends. This gets overheard by Jade and Tulip who persuade her to ask Lucas out as they wear different dresses. In addition, they wear the friendship bracelets that Electric Bloom still wears to this day. When it comes to the prom, Posey finds Lucas dancing with Shelly Sharp as she dances with Jade and Tulip. After performing a song outside of the prom, Posey, Jade, and Tulip go home. Lucas comes outside looking for Posey only to find that she had already left. Featured song: "The Lies We Tell Our Hearts" Guest stars: J'Adore Elizabeth as Shelly Sharp, Trisha Macaden as Shelly LeBrock, Luke Busey as The Vince, Leah Mei Gold as Sunny
9	"How It All Came Out in the Wash"	Robbie Countryman	Anna Suzuki	August 8, 2025	110	0.09
After meeting Dara Reneé who was doing a photo shoot next door and rooting for them in the Music Icon Awards, Electric Bloom answers a question on their "Ask Us Anything" regarding the aftermath of the Posey and Lucas drama. While looking for a gig, Electric Bloom was able to get one when Jade falls for the laundromat owner's son Dante. Tulip develops a skill at mastering the claw machine that she named "Clawde" after Posey fails to get a plush dolphin. To cover up Jade's crush in front of Posey, Tulip claims that she has a crush on Dante. Following their gig, Posey learns the truth and receives some plush dolphins that Tulip won. When Posey goes to confront Lucas, he thanked her for the advice and how he got the courage to ask Shelly Sharp out. Back in the present, Posey mentioned that she was able to move on from having a crush on Lucas. Jade still dated Dante after that gig, but that's another story. Tulip stopped using "Clawde" after he was "after her for her money". These events helped inspire their hit song "The Lies We Tell Our Hearts". Featured song: "The Lies We Tell Our Hearts" Guest stars: Dara Reneé as Herself, J'Adore Elizabeth as Shelly Sharp, Van Brunelle as Dante
10	"How Tulip Became a Shelly: A Halloween Nightmare"	Jody Margolin Hahn	Jonathan De Weerd and Paul David Smith	September 15, 2025 (Note: This episode accidentally aired out of schedule on September 15, 2025.)	107	0.03
On Halloween, Posey is dressed as a cowgirl, Jade is dressed as a skeleton, and Tulip is dressed as her grandmother. They do an "Ask Us Anything" as they talk about the time when Posey and Jade nearly lost Tulip to The Two Shellys. It all started when Ms. Mecklenberg was holding a planning committee for the school's Halloween theme as Posey mentions that Electric Bloom is going to perform at the Halloween party anyway. The Two Shellys show up and pitch their Sparkleween theme. This ends up winning Tulip over in the votes as she helps The Two Shelly's set up for Sparkleween. Meanwhile, Lucas and The Vince work to hand out wristbands to everyone who is attending Sparkleween. Eventually, Posey and Jade learn that they don't have to share the same things with Tulip as she abandons The Two Shellys to join Posey and Jade in performing their Halloween song. Back in the present, Electric Bloom wishes everyone a Happy Halloween while using a filter to make it look like their eyes are glowing. Featured song: "Electric Boo" Guest stars: J'Adore Elizabeth as Shelly Sharp, Trisha Macaden as Shelly LeBrock, Luke Busey as The Vince, Santina Muha as Ms. Mecklenberg
11	"How We Learned to Love Our Haters"	Robbie Countryman	Jess Pineda	October 5, 2025 (Note: This episode was first released on Disney+ on September 17, 2025.)	111	0.06
Electric Bloom mentions that they won four awards at the Music Icon Awards with one of them Jade unknowingly grabbed from Shaboozey. They answer a question on "Ask Us Anything" about what to do with their haters. It started when Mr. B enlisted Posey, Jade, and Tulip to help out with the "Save the Music" fundraiser due to budget cuts. When looking at the posts, Posey reads posts from The Edison Troll where Tulip misinterprets their trolling posts. This starts to affect their plans to help the "Save the Music" fundraiser. The Two Shellys deny any knowledge of the trolling as Lucas, The Vince, and Dante help to find the identity of The Edison Troll. Electric Bloom soon suspect The Edison Troll is run by a group of elderly lady singers called Lounge Ladies (consisting of Dolores, Georgie, and Ethel) who are retaliating for taking their gig. Following a compromise and The Vince having The Edison Troll's account blocked, Electric Bloom and the Lounge Ladies collaborate in performing "No Limits". Once the story is done, Electric Bloom mentions that they never learned the identity of The Edison Troll. Featured songs: "My Beat, My Drum", "No Limits" Guest stars: J'Adore Elizabeth as Shelly Sharp, Trisha Macaden as Shelly LeBrock, Luke Busey as The Vince, Clayton Thomas as Mr. B, Van Brunelle as Dante, Carolyn Hennesy as Dolores, Cleo King as Georgie, Lee Garlington as Ethel, Bruno Amato as Eddie
12	"How We Pulled a Song Out of Our Pocket"	Morenike Joela Evans	Ron Rappaport	October 12, 2025	112	0.03
Still celebrating their victory from the Music Icon Award, Electric Bloom tells a story on their "Ask Us Anything" of how Tulip wrote her first song and how it almost destroyed the band. It all started when WNJC, a college radio station hosts a songwriting contest where finalists play their songs live on the air and Electric Bloom is interested in participating. The host DJ Kim explains that participants must submit an original song by Friday on a jump drive, to avoid hackers stealing songs. Tulip volunteers to write the song for the contest, but she is dealing with extreme writer's block. Tulip takes a break and donates some of her clothes to the thrift store. While shopping, she bumps into Lucas Jasper who is shopping for a three week anniversary gift for Shelly Sharp. He is struggling finding a gift because he keeps imagining Shelly rejecting all of his gifts. Tulip grabs a coat and finds a poem in one of the pockets, which gave her inspiration for a melody. She sang the poem to the melody, hoping it would inspire her, but Posey and Jade walk in thinking Tulip actually wrote the song. Tulip tries to tell them that she got the lyrics from the coat's pocket, but they mistake it for getting the lyrics from her heart. Posey and Jade submit the song when Tulip walks away, but find her at the thrift store later where she admits that she didn't write the song. The girls go to the radio station to try and switch out their song, but DJ Kim doesn't let them. Later, the girls catch Shelly Sharp and Shelly LeBrock using AI to write their song in which they defend by saying AI is the future. Tulip shows Posey and Jade the cabinet full of lyrics she wrote and they like them and finish the song, which ultimately ended up being their hit song "Wolf Pack Energy." At the contest, Electric Bloom tries to sing their new version of the song and end up getting cut off and disqualified. Jade tricks Shelly Sharp into admitting they used AI to write their song, which also gets the Two Shellys disqualified. A rapper named Lil' Howdy wins, but admits that he only won due to his father owning the radio station. Lucas Jasper talks to Electric Bloom after the contest and tells them how brave it was for them to withdraw their song. He didn't like that the Two Shellys didn't write their own lyrics, so he goes into a room with Shelly Sharp to talk to her. Back in the present, Electric Bloom states that everybody gets writer's block. It then shows their live performance of "Wolf Pack Energy" Featured song: "Wolf Pack Energy" Guest stars: J'Adore Elizabeth as Shelly Sharp, Trisha Macaden as Shelly LeBrock, Heather Lynn Harris as DJ Kim, Chris Bey as Lil' Howdy
13	"How We Tried to Crash a Party"	Phill Lewis	Justin Varava	October 12, 2025	113	0.04
While at a spa, Electric Bloom takes a break from their "Ask Us Anything" and mentions how one of their high school adventures brought them here. It starts when Sunny at The Buzzy announces the contests. Because of Posey asking questions, Sunny gives the Lady Gaga tickets to Joey. Jade and Tulip decides that Posey needs to have a "Go With the Flow" Day. Posey gets a call from Janine (who was trying to call Priya) about a party at the house of new student Ava Bradley who is the daughter of music producer Stephanie Bradley. Jade and Tulip plan to take Posey to Stephanie Bradley's house to promote themselves to her as Tulip calls her personal driver Rhonda. Meanwhile, Lucas tells The Vince that he and Shelly aren't together anymore as The Vince plans to get Lucas to tell Posey what he feels about her. The Vince traces Posey to a spa in Hoboken where they plan to get in and meet Stephanie only to be driven out by the receptionist Ingrid. They try to get in using Tulip's personality Trixie which doesn't go well causing Posey, Jade, and Tulip to sneak in. The Vince arrives and gets Ingrid (who happens to know The Vince) to book a spa day for them. After some mishaps that led to Posey and Jade meeting Peg, the girls get another accidental call from Janine that was meant for Priya about a band at Ava's party going on a 20 minute break and to send another band they know to perform. They didn't make it to the party or down Emergency Route Hill, they do perform the song "The Right Time" at Modern Vintage after Tulip previously bonded with its new owner Peg at the spa. Janine once again gets Priya mixed up with Posey when she tells Lucas that she "Posey" met a guy causing Lucas into thinking that Posey is seeing someone else. Featured song: "The Right Time" Guest stars: Luke Busey as The Vince, Audrey Grace Marshall as Janine, Leah Mei Gold as Sunny, Irene White as Peg, Mary Birdsong as Ingrid
14	"How We Handled an Unexpected Visitor"	Jody Margolin Hahn	Lacey Dyer and Julia Layton	October 19, 2025 (Note: This episode was first released on Disney+ on October 1, 2025.)	114	0.07
Still at the spa while having reunited with Peg and viewing one of their concert performances, Electric Bloom recalls on their "Ask Us Anything" about the time when Jade had stayed at Tulip's house when Jade's parents are out of town. At that time, Tulip's younger child prodigy stepsister Kaia comes home from college and has her encounter with Jade. With Kaia jealous of Tulip's friendship with Jade, she works to sabotage it. Meanwhile, Posey works on her P-SAT where an incident occurs when she accidentally farted (that word kept getting cut off throughout the episode) and is weary that someone might've found out. Jade tries to do a distractible-type tripwire trap involving an inflated pool filled with honey only for it to backfire when Tulip falls in. It is around this time that Tulip learned what Kaia did which leads to Kaia and Jade settling their differences. Back at school, Posey figures that Janine has figured out that she farted and admits it in front of the school. Lucas comes to her aid and also farts and stating that everyone has that moment. In the final scene, Tulip introduces Kaia to an arrived Posey as Kaia identifies her from the incident. Featured song: "Unbreakable" Guest stars: Maia Kealoha as Kaia, Van Brunelle as Dante, Audrey Grace Marshall as Janine, Irene White as Peg
15	"How We Defeated a Jingle Bell Bully"	Jon Rosenbaum	Maggie Cannan and Emily Davila	October 19, 2025	115	0.06
During the Christmas season, Electric Bloom does an "Ask Us Anything" about the time when they spent Christmas together. It all started when Posey and Jade set up decorations around Tulip's locker. They end up learning that Tulip hates Christmas because of an incident when she was 8-years-old when a young girl in her class mocked her bad singing at the time and led to an incident where a cardboard Santa Claus lost its head. Posey and Jade come up with a plan that involves signing up for a singing event at the Mall. The Two Shellys have also signed up. Posey and Jade are present when Shelly LeBrock ends up having her encounter with her cousin Michelley who she has a poor relationship with and has her own singing group with two girls named Kelly named Michelley and the Kellys. Even though Posey and Jade briefly worked with The Two Shellys in trying to get Tulip to like Christmas, it only gets worse when Tulip identifies Michelley as the girl who criticized her as well as Shelly LeBrock ends up settling her difference with Michelley. Meanwhile, Lucas and The Vince volunteer to help with the gift-wrapping as Dante is weary that Jade won't like her present. After a walk, Tulip hallucinates seeing her 8-year-old counterpart who encourages her to get over her hatred for Christmas. At the singing event after The Two Shellys and Michelley and the Two Kellys have finished their songs, Electric Bloom goes next by singing "Feels Like Christmas". This ends up impressing Michelley who notes that Tulip improved her singing since they last saw each other. Shelly LeBrock thanks Tulip for getting her and Michelley to settle their differences. Jade likes the present that she got from Dante. Electric Bloom then takes part in shopping for charity as Tulip sees her 8-year-old self one final time. Featured song: "Feels Like Christmas" Guest stars: J'Adore Elizabeth as Shelly Sharp, Trisha Macaden as Shelly LeBrock, Luke Busey as The Vince, Van Brunelle as Dante, Tara Macaden as Michelley, Ellie Rei Stinson as 8-Year-Old Tulip
16	"How We (Sorta) Got Our First Big Break: Part One"	Jody Margolin Hahn	Alex Fox, Eric Friedman, and Rachel Lewis	October 26, 2025	116	0.07
While in their private jet, Electric Bloom answers a question on their "Ask Us Anything" on if they competed on any singing competitions. It all started when Principal Jeffers was not in a good mood and giving detention to anyone who does lesser offenses. He stumbles upon the room that Jade was using for Electric Bloom's meeting area where he locks it up and gives them Saturday detentions which will affect one Saturday where they plan to compete in a reality show called "The Ultimate Voice" which Stephanie Bradley is going to be a guest judge. With help from Lucas and The Vince, they learn that Principal Jeffers doesn't have much of a life outside of school. After a recalling that Principal Jeffers is into theater, Posey, Jade, and Tulip get him into a theater project where he ends up relenting to call off his Saturday detention decree even when he meets, dates, and gets engaged to Peg. A new problem arises when Electric Bloom has to perform at their wedding on the same day at the same hotel where the auditions for "The Ultimate Voice" are. Peg ends up learning the truth and fails to intimidate the stage manager Blayson to let them in. After a performance where The Vince fills in for the DJ, Jade dances with Dante and Tulip dances with a boy named Shane. Posey clears up the misunderstanding with Lucas by stating that they didn't make it to the party. During this time, Electric Bloom is approached by Stephanie Bradley who heard their singing and wants to work with them. Featured song: "Radio" Guest stars: Lennon Parham as Stephanie Bradley, Luke Busey as The Vince, Van Brunelle as Dante, DaJuan Johnson as Principal Jeffers, Irene White as Peg, Dylan Adler as Blayson
17	"How We (Sorta) Got Our First Big Break: Part Two"	Jody Margolin Hahn	Alex Fox, Eric Friedman, and Rachel Lewis	October 26, 2025	117	0.05
Continuing from the last episode, Electric Bloom has won their chance at working with Stephanie Bradley as Posey has also scored a date with Lucas. Arriving at the recording studio that Stephanie runs, they meet Sofia Carson who inspires them not to lose the special thing they have. Stephanie later arrives where she managed to obtain Blayson as her personal assistant. Her visions on how to make use of Electric Bloom do not go the way that the girls hoped as she makes various changes to them. When Jade doesn't show up on time, Stephanie enlists a super-social media influencer named Destiny to cover for Jade. Posey and Tulip stand up to Stephanie and cut their ties with her. Jade then shows up wanting to do the same thing only to find out that Posey and Tulip already beat her to it. Though Jade still gets the final word in as Electric Bloom goes their separate ways from Stephanie. Sometime later, Posey has her date with Lucas as she teaches him how to play the guitar. Later that night, Posey tells Jade and Tulip about how her date went. They soon get inspired to write the song "Wherever We Go, We Go Together" where they do a music video for that. After viewing their music video online, Electric Bloom receives good news when they receive a notification that Sofia Carson reposted their music video and more likes are pouring in. Featured songs: "Epic", "Wherever We Go, We Go Together" Guest stars: Sofia Carson as Herself, Lennon Parham as Stephanie Bradley, Luke Busey as The Vince, Clayton Thomas as Mr. B, Leah Mei Gold as Sunny, Dylan Adler as Blayson, Eliza Pryor as Destiny

== Production ==
On November 1, 2024, Disney Branded Television gave a series order to How We Became the Biggest Band in the World. The series is created by Crash & Bernstein and Bizaardvark alumni Eric Friedman, Alex Fox, and Rachel Lewis, all of whom serve as executive producers, with Friedman also serving as showrunner. Diane Warren and Bahareh Batmang, who also serve as executive producers, pitched the original concept of the show to Disney Branded Television. Warren writes the songs in the pilot and several of the episodes. Jody Margolin Hahn directed and served as an executive producer on the pilot and several other episodes. The series was revealed to have been pitched in 2019. On June 4, 2025, it was announced that the series, under the new title of Electric Bloom, would premiere on July 10, 2025.

== Music ==
The Electric Bloom: Season 1 Original Soundtrack was released on September 12, 2025. It features 12 original songs performed by cast members Lumi Pollack, Carmen Sanchez, and Ruby Marino, including several songs written by executive producer Diane Warren. Other songwriters and producers include Mitch Allan, Michelle Zarlenga, Chantry Johnson, Justin Gray, Lucky West, Paris Carney, Doug Rockwell, and Tova Litvin, The Honeybess Fight Song & Electric Boo are not part of the official album.

== Release ==
Electric Bloom premiered on July 10, 2025 on Disney Channel. The first thirteen episodes were released on Disney+ on September 17, 2025, with episodes 11–13 being released prior to their televised premieres. Episodes 14–17 were released on Disney+ on October 1, 2025, with all of them being released prior to their televised premieres.

== Reception ==
=== Critical response ===
Fernanda Camargo of Common Sense Media rated Electric Bloom three out of five stars, highlighting the series' focus on friendship, emphasizing the main characters' supportive and loving relationships despite occasional conflict. She observed that the show delivers positive messages about standing up for oneself, celebrating individuality, and appreciating diverse paths to success. Allison McClain Merrill of Parents described Electric Bloom as a "welcome addition to Disney Channel’s upbeat slate of programming," underscoring its blend of friendship, music, and coming-of-age themes. She emphasized the series' focus on relatable teen experiences, individuality, and "wholesome" friendships.

=== Ratings ===
Viewership and ratings per season of Electric Bloom
Season	Episodes	First aired		Last aired		Avg. viewers (millions)
Season	Episodes	Date	Viewers (millions)	Date	Viewers (millions)	Avg. viewers (millions)
1	17	July 10, 2025	0.14	October 26, 2025	0.05	0.09

On Disney Channel, Electric Bloom premiered on July 10, 2025, drawing a total audience (P2+) of 142,000 viewers with a 0.04 rating, including 75,500 household viewers (0.06 rating). Subsequent broadcasts recorded 93,000 viewers (0.03) on July 18 and 128,000 viewers (0.04) on July 25, followed by 94,000 viewers (0.03) on August 1 and 89,000 viewers (0.03) on August 8. Later episodes drew 30,000 viewers (0.01) on September 15, 65,000 viewers (0.02) on October 19, and 74,000 viewers (0.02) on October 26. Toward the end of the year, the program recorded 107,000 viewers (0.03) on December 30 and 115,700 viewers (0.04) on January 2, 2026. More recent broadcasts drew 83,400 viewers (0.03) on January 20, 115,700 viewers (0.04) on January 26, 142,800 viewers (0.04) on January 27, and 129,200 viewers (0.04) on January 28, including 54,400 viewers aged 18–49 (0.04 rating), 50,300 viewers aged 25–54 (0.04 rating), and 51,200 household viewers (0.04 rating). Across this period, total viewership (P2+) ranged from 30,000 to 142,800 viewers, while ratings among adults aged 18–49 varied between 0.01 and 0.05.

=== Accolades ===
Electric Bloom was nominated for Best Song - Onscreen Performance - TV Show/Limited Series at the 2025 Hollywood Music In Media Awards. The series also received a nomination for Best Hair Styling - Children and Teen Television Programming at the 2026 Make-Up Artists & Hair Stylists Guild Awards.
