= Electric Bloom: Season 1 (Original Soundtrack) =

TV series soundtrack album

Soundtrack album by Cast of Electric Bloom
- Released: September 12, 2025
- Genres: Pop; teen pop
- Length: 35:26
- Label: Walt Disney

Singles from Electric Bloom: Season 1 (Original Soundtrack)
- 1. "No Limits" Released: June 27, 2025; 2. "One Little Spark" Released: June 27, 2025; 3. "The Lies We Tell Our Hearts" Released: June 27, 2025; 4. "Wolf Pack Energy" Released: June 27, 2025

Electric Bloom: Season 1 (Original Soundtrack) is the soundtrack album for season 1 (and the only season) of the Disney Channel series Electric Bloom. The soundtrack features multiple songs written by Diane Warren.

== Background ==
In June 2025, the series Electric Bloom was announced alongside the release of four singles, "No Limit", "One Little Spark", "The Lies We Tell Our Hearts" and "Wolf Pack Energy". The full soundtrack was released on September 17, 2025. All songs are performed by Lumi Pollack, Carmen Sanchez, and Ruby Marino.

== Track listing ==
Electric Bloom: Season 1 (Original Soundtrack) track listing
No.	Title	Writer(s)	Length
1.	"Wherever We Go We Go Together"	Diane Warren	2:50
2.	"My Beat My Drum"	Diane Warren	2:50
3.	"No Limits"	Chantry Johnson; Mitch Allan; Michelle Zarlenga	2:39
4.	"The One"	Justin Gray	2:23
5.	"One Little Spark"	Diane Warren	2:45
6.	"Unbreakable"	Lucky West; Paris Carney	3:18
7.	"The Lies We Tell Our Hearts"	Diane Warren	3:22
8.	"Wolf Pack Energy"	Doug Rockwell; Tova Litvin	3:30
9.	"The Right Time"	Diane Warren	2:53
10.	"Feels Like Christmas"	Diane Warren	3:04
11.	"Radio"	Diane Warren	3:21
12.	"Epic"	Diane Warren	2:26
Total length:			35:26
