= Branyan =

Branyan may refer to:

- Branyan, Queensland, a locality in the Bundaberg Region, Queensland, Australia

== People with the surname ==
- John Branyan (born 1965), American comedian
- Russell Branyan (born 1975), American baseball player
