= Trey Kennedy =

American comedian

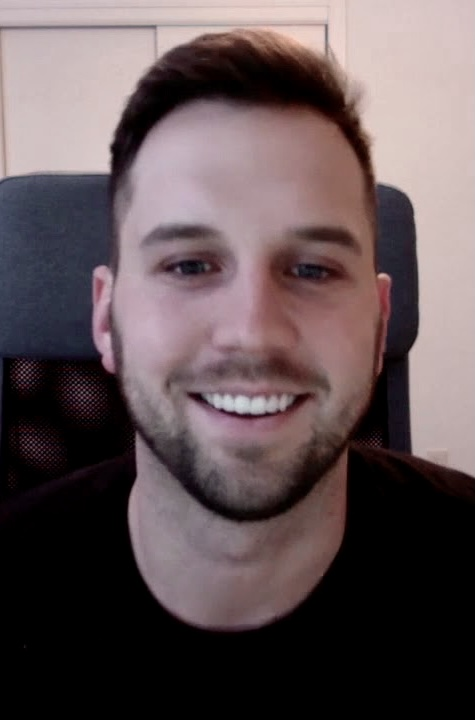
- Kennedy in 2020
- Born: November 17, 1992 (age 33); Edmond, Oklahoma
- Education: Oklahoma State University

Comedy career
- Years active: 2011-present
- Medium: Stand-up
- Genres: Christian comedy, sketch comedy, observational comedy
- Website: https://treykennedy.com/

Thomas "Trey" Kennedy III is a comedian, actor, and singer, known for his YouTube and TikTok videos. He emerged on the video-sharing app, Vine, but after its shutdown, he transitioned to Facebook, Instagram, and YouTube.

== Early life ==
Kennedy is from Edmond, Oklahoma. He has described himself as a "shy kid" who never thought he would be an entertainer. Kennedy played basketball during his childhood. Kennedy attended Oklahoma State University, where he was a member of Beta Theta Pi and began making videos on Vine with his friends. After Vine ended, Kennedy continued to make comedic videos and release them on Facebook and Instagram. Kennedy later received an MBA from Oklahoma State University, where he was on the board of the Masters of Business Administration Association.

== Career ==
Kennedy began singing in 2011, at age 19, performing pop and rhythm and blues. He did not sing when he was growing up, and his family was not very musical. His college friends encouraged him to pursue singing after hearing him sing along to the radio, and he entered a charity contest during which he was well received. In 2016, Kennedy released an EP, Take Me to the River. Kennedy has also released several singles. He has stated that he is working on a music project with a producer in his home state of Oklahoma. Kennedy started a Kickstarter campaign to fund the project.

Beginning in 2017, Trey Kennedy frequently collaborated with John Crist. Together, the comedians have released several viral videos, including one about bachelorette parties in Nashville. Additionally, Kennedy joined Crist on several of his 2018 tour dates. Kennedy has also done several collaboration videos with King Bach.

In 2019, Kennedy began hosting a podcast, Correct Opinions with Trey Kennedy, which is produced by Studio71 and co-hosted with his friend and collaborator Jake Triplett and his wife Katie Kennedy. According to Chartable, the podcast has been in the top 100 for comedy podcasts in the United States, Canada, Australia, and Great Britain.

Kennedy has done several stand-up appearances, including a November 2019 appearance in Madison, Wisconsin.

Kennedy's January 2019 video, "Moms", had over 4.8 million views on Facebook. Another video of Kennedy's that mocks middle school students received over 14 million views. The video led to more videos about middle school students, and in March 2020, Kennedy released a TV series, Middle School Maddox, in which Kennedy spoofs middle school angst. Kennedy's 2020 tour, the “Are You For Real?” tour, was postponed due to the COVID-19 pandemic. It was originally announced in January 2020 and was scheduled to begin on March 11, 2020.

As of July 2026, Kennedy has 4.2 million followers on TikTok, 240.7 million total views on YouTube, and over 5.3 million Facebook followers.

== Books ==
- Dads Be Like: 'Tis the Season to be Swaggy (2018)
- Girls Be Like

== Personal life ==
In September 2019, Kennedy announced his engagement to Katie Byrum, a biomedical engineer. Trey and Katie were married in a private ceremony on May 23, 2020. The couple welcomed a son in February 2023 and a daughter in September 2024. Kennedy is based in Kansas City, and is a fan of the Kansas City Chiefs. He is a Christian.

== Discography ==
- Take Me to the River (EP) (2016)
- Amy (Single) (2018)
- Irresistible (Single) (2018)
- Miracle (Single) (2018)
- My My My (Single) (2018)
- Move With You (Single) (2018)
- Why You Doin' So Much? (Single) (2020)
- Trapped (Single) (2020)
- Seltzer Saturday (Single) (2020)
- Vibes Are Up (Single) (2021)
- Alone (Single) (2022)
- Grow Up (Album) (2025)

== Filmography ==
Film
Year	Title	Role	Ep.	Ref.
2020	Middle School Maddox	Maddox	1-4	
