= John Crist (comedian) =

American comedian (born 1984)

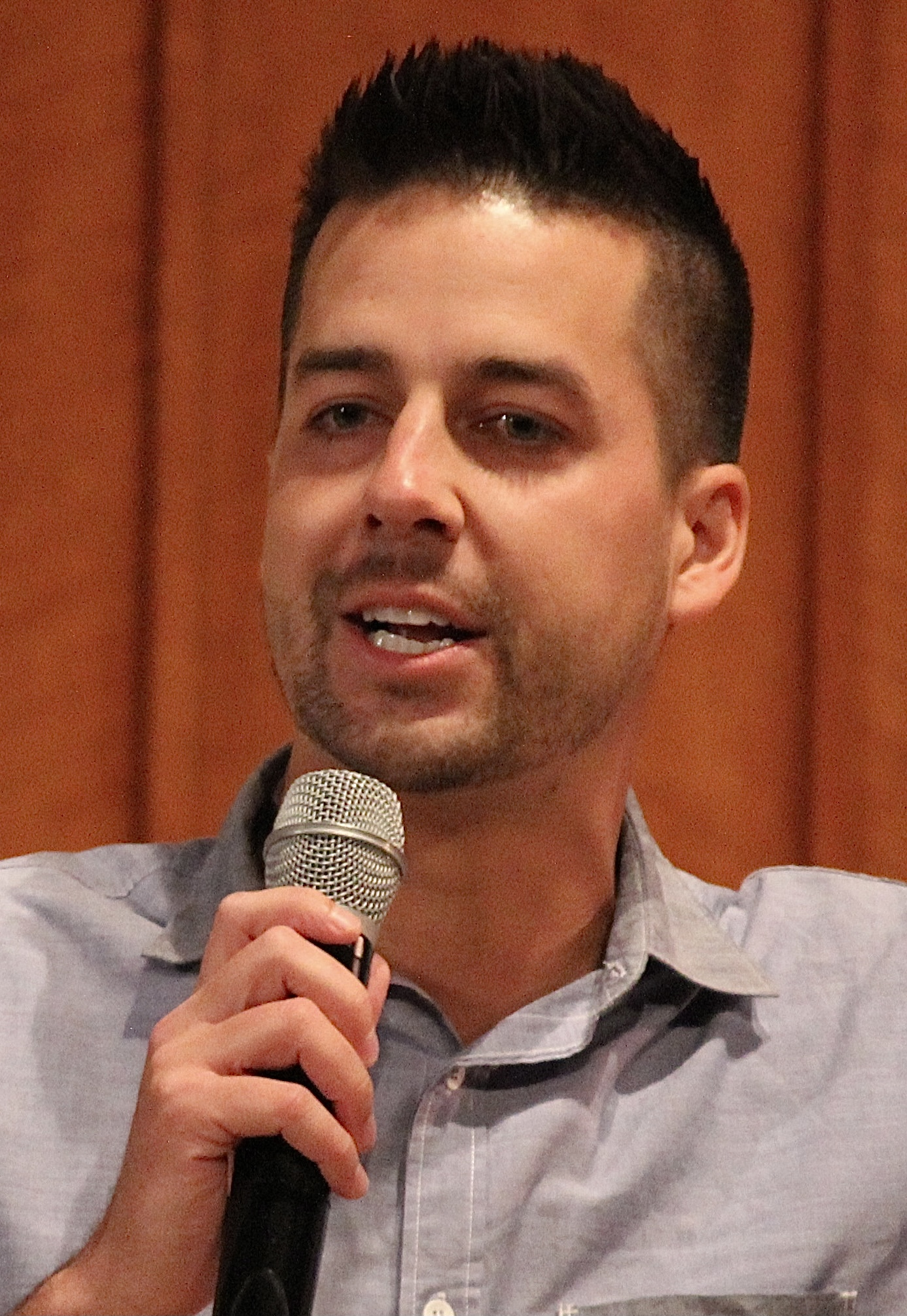
- Crist in 2017
- Born: John Barak Crist; March 20, 1984 (age 42); Atlanta, Georgia, U.S.
- Spouse: Lydia Fielder (m. 2026)

Comedy career
- Years active: 2009–present
- Medium: Stand-up
- Genres: Christian comedy, sketch comedy, observational comedy
- Subjects: Christianity, Christian culture, millennials, consumerism, family
- Website: johncristcomedy.com

John Crist (born March 20, 1984) is an American comedian from Lilburn, Georgia. He is known for his work creating comedy sketch videos for YouTube, including "Every parent at Disney", "Millennial International: Sponsor a Millennial Today", "If golf and soccer switched announcers", and "Weather Man MELTS down on live TV". Crist has opened for Jeff Foxworthy, Dave Chappelle, Seth Meyers, Tim Hawkins, and Anjelah Johnson.

In November 2019, allegations of sexual misconduct led to Crist cancelling the remainder of his Immature Thoughts comedy tour, and a planned Netflix stand-up special featuring him was put on hold. Crist later used the footage for his "What Are We Doing?" Special, his first YouTube special. In October 2022, Crist released his first book "Delete That (and Other Failed Attempts To Look Good Online)"

== Early life ==
John Crist was born on March 20, 1984, in a suburb of Atlanta, Georgia. He has seven siblings. His father was a pastor and, as a child, Crist was deeply entrenched in all aspects of Christian culture.

Crist attended Samford University in Birmingham, Alabama, graduating in 2006 with a degree in journalism. After graduation, Crist moved to Colorado and in 2009, he began performing at open mic nights and local comedy clubs, as well as churches, restaurants, and casinos. In 2009, Crist made his first national comedy debut with an appearance on Louie Anderson's Las Vegas Comedy Show Larger Than Life.

== Career ==
Shoot, I grew up in Georgia. My dad is a pastor, and I was the third of eight homeschooled children. Coming from a background like that, how do you NOT write jokes?

Crist's first performance was in 2009 at an open mic night at a Chili's restaurant. In 2012, Crist won The Denver Improv's Got Laughs Competition, The Loonees Comedy Competition, and also appeared as a finalist on Comedy Central's Up Next Comedy Competition. Crist also performed for U.S. troops who were stationed in the Middle East as part of a comedy tour.

In 2014, Crist appeared on Louie Anderson's episode of Gotham Comedy Live, which aired on AXS TV. Anderson, said of Crist: "It's only a matter of time until John Crist is a household name. He is so likable, and his stand-up is top notch." Later that year, in an effort to grow his career, Crist moved to Los Angeles.

In late 2015, Crist released his first comedy special on DVD, I Got Questions. Then, in the summer of 2016, he developed a three-minute comedy sketch called Christian Music: How It's Made. The video was written by Crist and produced by Aaron Chewning. In it, the pair starred as two record executives telling a new Christian band how to make it big in the music business. Crist gained increased success after the video went viral. The video has over two million views on YouTube. In addition to Chewning, Crist frequently collaborates with fellow Christian comedian and musician Trey Kennedy.

In fall 2017, Crist sold out his first headlining tour, Captive Thoughts, which spanned 20 East Coast cities. In summer 2018, Crist moved to Nashville, Tennessee, and signed with United Talent Agency. Later that year, he participated in Winter Jam, an annual Christian music tour and launched his second headlining tour, Human Being Tour, which included 55 U.S. cities. On May 19, 2019, Crist, DJ Mykael V, nobigdyl., and 1K Phew released a new rap single and music video based on Crist's regularly used phrase, Check Your Heart. The song was number two on the iTunes Christian charts.

== Personal life ==
Crist was in a brief relationship with country singer Lauren Alaina from May to September 2019.

Crist is a Christian. He lives in Nashville, Tennessee.

=== Sexual misconduct allegations and aftermath ===
In 2019, it was reported that over the previous decade Crist had used his reputation and platform to harass and/or exploit young women. In November 2019, Crist announced that he was canceling the remainder of his 2019 tour dates "in order to devote all my time and energy on getting healthy spiritually, mentally and physically." The statement acknowledged his "sexual sin and addiction struggles." Crist's Netflix special I Ain't Praying for That was put on hold. Crist was also at work on his first book, which was set to be published by WaterBrook, an imprint of Penguin Random House, in 2020. It was also put on hold. He was replaced as a keynote speaker at the Strength to Stand Student Bible Conference by rapper Ye.

On July 15, 2020, after not posting for eight months, Crist posted a video message on his social media pages in which he thanked his followers for their support during his treatment. His videos after his return to social media resembled those he'd posted before. An imprint of Penguin Random House published Crist's "Delete That" in 2022.

== Filmography ==
Year	Title	Role	Notes
2013	Sounds on 29th	Himself	TV series
2014	Gotham Comedy Live	Himself	TV series documentary
2015	Road Hard	Himself	Film
2015	I Got Questions	Himself	Video
2016	Weekday Wrap-Up	Co-Host, Writer	1 Episode
2019	Fox and Friends	Himself - Christian Comedian	1 Episode
2022	What Are We Doing?	Himself	YouTube comedy special/ former Netflix Special
2023	John Crist: Would Like to Release a Statement	Himself	YouTube comedy special
Canceled	I Ain't Praying For That	Himself	Netflix Special
2024	Emotional Support	Himself	YouTube comedy special

== Discography ==
List of singles, with selected chart positions, showing year released and album name
Title	Year	Peak positions	Album
Title	Year	US Christ.	Album
"Check Your Heart" (with 1K Phew, DJ Mykael VSerial Comma, and nobigdyl.)	2019	31	Non-album singles
"Every Christian Music Video"	2023	—	Non-album singles
