= The Fallout (film) =

2021 film by Megan Park

- Promotional release poster
- Directed by: Megan Park
- Written by: Megan Park
- Produced by: Shaun Sanghani; David Brown; Giulia Prenna; Joannie Burstein; Rebecca Miller; Cara Shine; Todd Lundbohm
- Starring: Jenna Ortega; Maddie Ziegler; Niles Fitch; Will Ropp; Julie Bowen; John Ortiz; Lumi Pollack; Shailene Woodley
- Cinematography: Kristen Correll
- Edited by: Jennifer Lee
- Music by: Finneas O'Connell
- Production companies: Clear Horizon; SSS Entertainment; The Burstein Company; 828 Media Capital; Clear Media Finance
- Distributed by: Warner Bros. Pictures; New Line Cinema
- Release dates: March 17, 2021 (SXSW); January 27, 2022 (United States)
- Running time: 92 minutes
- Country: United States
- Language: English

The Fallout is a 2021 American drama film written and directed by Megan Park in her feature film directorial debut. It stars Jenna Ortega as Vada Cavell, a high school student who navigates significant emotional trauma following a school shooting. It also stars Maddie Ziegler, Niles Fitch, Will Ropp, Julie Bowen, John Ortiz, Lumi Pollack and Shailene Woodley in supporting roles. The score is composed by American musician and actor Finneas O'Connell.

The Fallout premiered at South by Southwest on March 17, 2021, and was released on January 27, 2022, on HBO Max by New Line Cinema (via Warner Bros. Pictures). It received positive reviews from critics.

== Plot ==
High school student Vada goes to the restroom in the middle of class after her little sister Amelia calls her when she has her first period. While she is in the bathroom, a school shooting occurs. Vada hides in a stall with her schoolmates Mia and Quinton, whose brother is killed in the shooting.

Following the incident, it's revealed that at least 16 students were killed, and Vada has become depressed and isolated from her family, as well as her best friend Nick, but spends more and more time bonding with Mia. She cannot bring herself to enter the bathroom where she hid and wets her pants when she hears the sound of a soda can being crushed. In order to cope with her trauma, she takes ecstasy, and Nick has to help her through the resulting high. After another night of drinking, Mia tells Vada that she is falling in love with her, and they have sex.

Vada and Nick argue about her poor coping mechanisms, resulting in her venting to Quinton and then trying to kiss him, who gently rejects her as he is not emotionally ready for a relationship. She withdraws further from her family and friends, including Mia.

Later, Amelia admits to Vada that she assumed Vada resented her for the phone call that had put her in more danger. Vada assures her that that is not the case, and the two reconnect. Vada reconciles with her parents and Mia. By her next session with her therapist, Anna, Vada has made genuine progress in coming to terms with what happened, though she admits that she and Nick might not reconcile.

As Vada waits for Mia outside the latter's dance class, she receives a notification on her phone about a shooting at another school, and has a panic attack.

== Cast ==
- Jenna Ortega as Vada Cavell
- Maddie Ziegler as Mia Reed
- Niles Fitch as Quinton Hasland
- Will Ropp as Nick Feinstein, Vada's best friend
- Julie Bowen as Patricia Cavell, Vada's mother
- John Ortiz as Carlos Cavell, Vada's father
- Lumi Pollack as Amelia Cavell, Vada's young sister
- Shailene Woodley as Anna

== Production ==
In February 2020, it was announced Jenna Ortega had joined the cast of the film, with Megan Park directing from a screenplay she wrote. In April 2020, Maddie Ziegler joined the cast of the film. In May 2020, Will Ropp joined the cast of the film. In August 2020, Niles Fitch, Shailene Woodley, Julie Bowen and John Ortiz joined the cast of the film.

Filming was slated to begin in March 2020 but was postponed due to the COVID-19 pandemic. Principal photography began in Los Angeles in August 2020 and wrapped on September 11, 2020. In February 2021, it was announced that Finneas O'Connell would be scoring the film, marking his first film composing debut. WaterTower Music has released the soundtrack.

== Release ==
In December 2020, Universal Pictures acquired international distribution rights to the film. The film had its world premiere at South by Southwest on March 17, 2021. In July 2021, HBO Max acquired distribution rights to the film, with New Line Cinema distributing in territories where HBO Max is not available via parent company Warner Bros. Pictures. It was released on HBO Max on January 27, 2022.

== Reception ==
=== Critical response ===
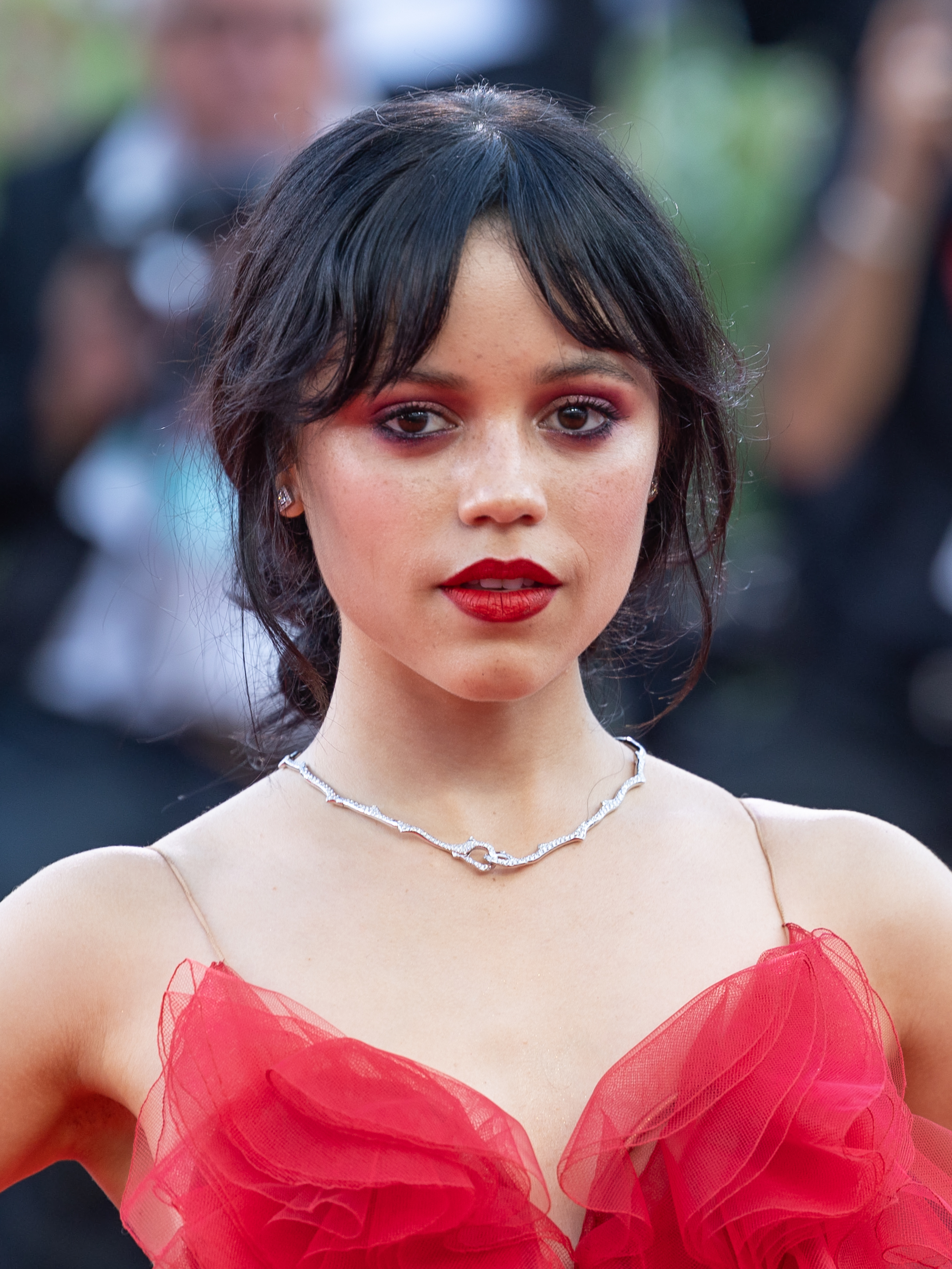
Ortega's performance was praised by critics, many of whom called it her breakthrough film role.

On the review aggregator website Rotten Tomatoes, 90% of 71 critics' reviews are positive. The website's consensus reads: "Empathetic and well-acted, The Fallout uses the aftermath of trauma to grapple with the experience of grief." Metacritic, which uses a weighted average, assigned the film a score of 84 out of 100, based on 12 critics, indicating "universal acclaim". Kate Erbland of IndieWire gave a rating of B+ and said the film tackles "real emotional stakes in the gloss of social media, unearthing something powerful in the process". Amanda Sink of The Hollywood Outsider called the film "a remarkable film that explores the ramifications of tragedy on our kids and how the human conditional response is not a one-size-fits-all".

Park's direction and Ortega's acting were both praised, and several critics cite it as Ortega's "breakout" film role. Sheri Linden of The Hollywood Reporter called the film "sensitive and piercing" and praised Park's screenplay and direction, the performances and Finneas' score, and wrote that "...Ortega's beautifully nuanced turn understands the nothing-to-look-at-here façade and the chinks in the armor". Peter Debruge of Variety called the film a "stellar debut" from Park and noted that "Ortega in particular seems to have found her voice." CinemaBlend praised the chemistry between Ortega and Ziegler, and stated that the "two girls at the center of it all also look phenomenal, as a true bond can be sensed in the process of bringing this story to life".

=== Audience viewership ===
On the week of its release, The Fallout was the number one most-watched streaming original film in the United States, as reported by TV Time.

=== Accolades ===
Award	Date of Ceremony	Category	Recipient	Result	Ref.
South by Southwest Film Festival	March 19, 2021	Narrative Feature Competition Grand Jury Award	The Fallout	Won	
South by Southwest Film Festival	March 19, 2021	Brightcove Illumination Award	Megan Park	Won	
South by Southwest Film Festival	March 23, 2021	Narrative Feature Competition Audience Award	The Fallout	Won	
Hollywood Critics Association Midseason Awards	July 1, 2022	Best Actress	Jenna Ortega	Nominated	
Hollywood Critics Association TV Awards	August 14, 2022	Best Streaming Movie	The Fallout	Nominated	
Austin Film Critics Association	January 10, 2023	Breakthrough Artist Award	Jenna Ortega (also nominee for X, Scream and Studio 666)	Won	
GLAAD Media Awards	March 30, 2023	Outstanding Film - Streaming Or TV	The Fallout	Nominated	
