= Freight Mabrey =

American podcast personality and tour manager

- Born: Christopher A. Mabrey; March 26, 1963 (age 62)
- Occupation: Best Ever
- Employer: Rock Show Comedy
- Known for: Love of fruit; Comebacks; Gonzo impression
- Height: 5 ft 11 in (180 cm)

Christopher A. "Freight" Mabrey (born March 26, 1963) is an American podcast personality and tour manager. He is best known as a member of comedian Tim Hawkins' Poddy Break podcast.

== Early life ==
Freight was the son of Bill Mabrey and Alyce Faye Mabrey. He attended Fort Zumwalt High School and played right guard and kicker for the school's football team.

== Poddy Break ==
Freight is a frequent cast member on comedian Tim Hawkins' Poddy Break podcast. Freight is known for his love of fruit and talking animals, as well as his inability to pronounce the word "wolf." He frequently uses witty comeback lines known as "Freightbacks" and does impressions of pirates and Gonzo. He also often abruptly changes the subject of the podcast's conversation, a phenomenon known on the podcast as a "seg-Freight." Freight's fans are known as "Dalfreightions." In September, 2016, the hashtag #iamfreight was introduced by fans.

== Personal life ==
Freight married Susan "Pooz" Story in 1989. Freight has three kids: Caleb (born February 7, 1995), Josh—also known as Chang (born February 21, 1998), and Sophie (born in December, 2006). He is a cousin of Tim Hawkins.
