= Autumn and the Black Jaguar =

- French theatrical release poster
- Directed by: Gilles de Maistre
- Screenplay by: Prune De Maistre
- Produced by: Catherine Camborde; Marco Colombo; Gilles de Maistre; Mattia Della Puppa; Sylvain Proulx; Jonathan Vanger
- Starring: Emily Bett Rickards; Lumi Pollack; Paul Greene; Kelly Hope Taylor; Letitia Brookes; Wayne Baker; Lucrezia Pini
- Cinematography: Olivier Laberge
- Edited by: Julien Rey
- Music by: Armand Amar
- Production companies: Mai-Juin Productions; Wishing Tree Productions; Adler Entertainment
- Distributed by: StudioCanal (France, Germany, Australia and New Zealand); Photon Films; TVA Films (Canada); 01 Distribution; Leone Film Group (Italy)
- Release dates: 1 February 2024 (Germany); 7 February 2024 (France); 22 February 2024 (Italy); 1 March 2024 (Canada)
- Running time: 100 minutes
- Countries: France; Canada; Italy; Germany
- Language: English
- Budget: €10 million
- Box office: $22 million

Autumn and the Black Jaguar (French: Le dernier jaguar, Italian: Emma e il giaguaro nero) is a 2024 adventure film directed by Giles de Maistre. The film stars Lumi Pollack as Autumn, who discovered her childhood village is under threat from animal traffickers and decides she must return to the Amazon to her jaguar.

The film was released in France on 7 February 2024.

== Synopsis ==
Growing up in the Amazon rainforest gave Autumn the rarest of friendships - a lost jaguar cub she discovers named Hope. When a tragic event forces Autumn to leave Hope for the unknowns of New York City, she dreams for years of going back to the rainforest and her friend. Aged 14, and having grown accustomed to city life, Autumn discovers her childhood village is under threat from animal traffickers and decides she must return to the Amazon to her beloved jaguar. Anja - Autumn's endearingly clumsy biology teacher - unsuccessfully tries to dissuade her from this reckless plan. Joined by Anja, Autumn embarks on a journey to reunite with Hope and save her from those who seek to destroy the rainforest and its wildlife.

— StudioCanal

== Cast ==
- Lumi Pollack as Autumn Edison
  - Airam Camacho as eight-year-old Autumn
- Paul Greene as Saul Edison
- Eva Avila as Ellie Edison
- Emily Bett Rickards as Anja
- Kelly Hope Taylor as Doria Dargan
- Wayne Baker as Oré
- Lucrezia Pini as Celya

== Production ==
=== Development ===
The Last Jaguar is indirectly linked to Mia and the White Lion and its success all over the world, who were asking for a sequel to Giles de Maistre. But the director explained:

It was unthinkable, the relationship between the young girl and the lion had ended with the end of filming, and we couldn't "take it back". A Mia and the White Lion 2 was therefore out of the question, but it made me think of another idea, using the same team to highlight this time the destruction of the Amazon rainforest and the very lucrative and little-known "animal trafficking".

=== Filming ===
Filming took place in January 2022 in Playa del Carmen, Mexico, and from September to early December 2022 in Montreal, Canada. Filming lasted for 60 days.

== Release ==
The film was first released in Germany on 1 February 2024, and later in France on 7 February 2024. It was also released in Italy on 22 February 2024, 1 March 2024 in French-speaking Canada, and 29 March 2024 in English-speaking Canada. On June 11, 2024, Blue Fox Entertainment acquired the U.S. distribution rights to the film, and released the film theatrically on January 17, 2025.

== Reception ==
On the review aggregator website Rotten Tomatoes, 36% of 11 critics' reviews are positive, with an average rating of 4.7/10.
