= Will Ropp =

American actor

- Born: April 21, 1994 (age 32); Darien, Connecticut, United States
- Education: The Bolles School
- Alma mater: University of Michigan (BFA)
- Occupation: Actor
- Years active: 2014–present
- Height: 6 ft 1 in (1.85 m)

Will Ropp (born April 21, 1994) is an American actor best known for his recurring role as Wyatt on the first two seasons of the Hulu teen comedy drama series Love, Victor (2020–21). Ropp is also known for his supporting roles in films such as The Way Back (2020), Silk Road, The Fallout (both 2021), The Greatest Beer Run Ever (2022), Sitting in Bars with Cake, and The Line (both 2023).

== Life and career ==
Will was born in Darien, Connecticut. After graduating from The Bolles School in Jacksonville, Florida, he went on to earn a Bachelor of Fine Arts degree at the University of Michigan. He made his feature film acting debut in the 2017 film The 'Claw after appearing in numerous short films prior. In 2020, he received his breakthrough role as Kenny Dawes on the sports drama film The Way Back by Warner Bros. Pictures. He next appeared in the 2021 releases Silk Road and The Fallout.

== Filmography ==
=== Film ===
Year	Title	Role	Notes
2014	The 4th Stage	Young Don	Short film
2014	Christmas	Christmas Partier	Short film
2015	We're Working on It	Partygoer	Short film
2015	Steps	Mac	Short film
2016	The Dejects	Ezra Locke	Short film
2017	The 'Claw	Andrew Van Bellingham	
2018	Schmik	Mark	Short film
2019	Dauntless: The Battle of Midway	Mansfield	
2019	Drama Drama	PM	
2019	Riptide	Tripp	Short film
2020	The Way Back	Kenny Dawes	
2021	The Unhealer	Tony	
2021	Silk Road	Shields	
2021	The Fallout	Nick Feinstein	
2021	Amy and Peter Are Getting Divorced	Noah	
2021	A Locker Room Nightmare	Richie	Short film
2022	The Greatest Beer Run Ever	Kevin McLoone	
2023	Only the Good Survive	Erve Gann	
2023	The Line	Bayne Ellis	
2023	Sitting in Bars with Cake	Brock	
2024	A Bear in the Woods	Mark	Short film
2024	Joker: Folie à Deux	Joker Fan #1	
2026	Brian	—N/a	Director and producer

Key
†	Denotes works that have not yet been released

=== Television ===
Year	Title	Role	Notes
2016	Speechless	College Dude	Episode: "D-i-Dimeo A-c-Academy"
2019	Timber the Series	Alex	2 episodes
2019	College	Beannie	Episode: "College"
2020–2021	Love, Victor	Wyatt	3 episodes
2021	The Sex Lives of College Girls	Milo	2 episodes
2023	Dave	Connor	Episode: "Texas"
2023	Fatal Attraction	Elijah	2 episodes
2025	Adults	Kyle Haberman	Episode: "Pilot"
