= Dustin Nickerson =

American stand-up comedian (born 1984)

- Nickerson in 2024
- Born: 1984 (age 41–42); Washington, U.S.
- Education: University of Washington
- Notable work: How to Be Married (to Melissa)
- Spouse: Melissa Hoglund (m. 2004)
- Children: 3

Comedy career
- Years active: 2012–present
- Medium: Stand-up comedy
- Genres: Observational comedy; clean comedy
- Subjects: Everyday life; parenting; marriage; sports
- Website: dustinnickerson.com

Dustin Nickerson (born 1984) is an American stand-up comedian. A native of the Seattle area, he began performing at open mics in San Diego in the early 2010s. Married relatively young with three children, Nickerson and his wife, Melissa, were parenting teenagers while they were still in their 30s, and much of his comedy focuses on family life. Known for being a clean comedian, Nickerson released his first special in 2020 and his second in 2023. In addition to regularly touring as a headliner, he has also been a frequent opener for comedians such as Taylor Tomlinson and Nate Bargatze.

== Early life, education and career ==
Nickerson was born in the Seattle area and raised in Federal Way by a single father. He grew up as a Seattle sports fan, first primarily of the Seattle Mariners and later rooting for the Seattle SuperSonics during their 1990s hot streak. Nickerson met his future wife, Melissa Hoglund, in a high school church youth group, and they married in 2004 when Nickerson was 19 and studying at the University of Washington. Their first child was born two years later.

After graduating from the UW, Nickerson worked as a youth pastor at Mars Hill Church in Seattle. After two years, he became disillusioned with Mark Driscoll's leadership style. A series of other jobs followed, one of which led to a move to San Diego. While working in middle management at a rec center, Nickerson began performing at open mic nights before eventually deciding to make comedy his full-time career.

== Comedy ==
Nickerson began his touring career in the Christian comedy genre. He was an opener for John Crist's 2018 tour. Nickerson appeared on Kevin Hart Presents: Hart of the City, a Comedy Central program for up-and-coming comics, in 2019.

Nickerson's first special, Overwhelmed, was recorded during the COVID-19 pandemic and appeared on Amazon Prime Video in 2020. He released a memoir and tongue-in-cheek marriage advice book entitled How to Be Married (to Melissa) in 2022, and his second special, It Runs in the Family, was released on YouTube in 2023. In addition to his own headlining tour, Nickerson was a regular opener for tours by Taylor Tomlinson—whom he has known since they began in comedy together in Southern California and who authored the foreword of his book—and Nate Bargatze. In 2024, he performed in the Netflix Is a Joke Festival and had his first performance on The Tonight Show. He has also appeared multiple times on The Late Late Show with James Corden and Tomlinson's After Midnight.

In addition to touring, Dustin and Melissa Nickerson have since 2020 co-hosted a comedy podcast on family life called Don't Make Me Come Back There that has had more than three million downloads as of June 2025. The podcast joined Bargatze's Nateland Podcast Network in 2024.

Nickerson's comedy has been described as "clean and mean". Common themes include parenting, marriage, and aging.

== Personal life ==
Nickerson lives in San Diego with Melissa and his three children. He has said that his family members have a veto over jokes he might tell about them. "What I'm doing is not more important than the relationships in your life. 'If you don't want me to say it, I won't,'" he told the Deseret News. "I had a family before comedy. Lord willing, I'll have a family after comedy."

After leaving youth ministry, Nickerson continues to identify as a Christian and attends church, although he is not a church member.

A lifelong Seattle sports fan, Nickerson has frequently referenced the disappointing performance of many Seattle teams in his work, but after Super Bowl LX he will begin referencing Sam Darnold as a G.O.A.T.
