= Kerri Pomarolli =

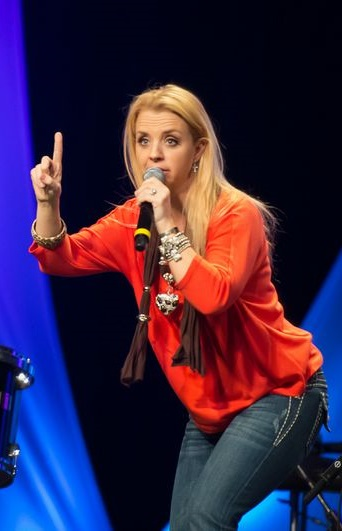
- Born: Dearborn, Michigan
- Education: University of Michigan

Comedy career
- Genres: Christian comedy, corporate comedy
- Website: kerripom.com

Kerri Pomarolli is an American comedian, actor and author based in Los Angeles. She is known for appearing on Judge Judy. She has appeared in over 75 stage productions and had recurring roles on Port Charles, and The Young and The Restless and "General Hospital". She has been in motion pictures such as "DeadLock", and her latest is on Netflix, "The Brennan Manning Story". She starred and co-produced I Love Kerri, which premiered on Sky Angel in June 2009. She has toured in stage productions from Off Broadway to Italy to playing the leading role of Vindice at the Young Vic Theater in London. She's also toured in many musical productions including" Leader of the Pack" in New York with leading role of Darlene Love.

She has published 4 books. In 2008, she published Guys Like Girls Named Jennie.

== Early life and education ==
Pomarolli was born in Dearborn, Michigan. When she was young, her mother enrolled her in dance classes. However, at the age of 11, she was diagnosed with scoliosis and was not able to pursue a career in dancing. A few months later, Pomarolli called a local theatre company and was cast as the lead in a local production of Lillian Hellman's The Children's Hour. Later, she worked in commercials and theatre in the Detroit area. She studied theater in New York at StageDoor Manor. She worked in Hershey Park as a musical performer. She interned for Bernadette Peters one woman show in Boston Ma.

She graduated from Northville High School and joined University of Michigan from where she graduated in Musical Theatre BFA .She studied drama in London at British American Drama Academy. She studied at Stella Adler Conservatory NYC. She studied comedy at The Groundlings and Second City in LA.

== Career ==
After graduating from the University of Michigan, Pomarolli moved to Hollywood and pursued an acting career for several years. However, according to her, the roles she was being offered were challenging to her as a person of faith so she branched into stand-up comedy. She attended Stella Adler Conservatory in New York and the British American Drama Academy in London.

She graduated from a two-year program at Second City. She studied at the Groundlings for Improv and joined the theater ensemble, The Actors Coop. She has appeared in more than 75 stage productions, including off Broadway in New York City at the Lambs Theater. Pomarolli co-founded Act in Faith, a drama ministry.

Pomarolli had recurring roles on Port Charles, and The Young and The Restless. General Hospital . She did several films including Deadlock on Showtime TVE. She has appeared on The Tonight Show multiple times parodying Jenna Bush and Tonya Harding. She has been a correspondent to CNN's Showbiz Tonight on faith in Hollywood. In 2009, she hosted Laugh Break on Mom TV.

She wrote the book Moms Night Out that came with the hit motion picture starring Patricia Heaton.

Pomarolli appeared on the Oxygen Network's reality show Tori and Dean: Inn Love, and starred and co-produced I Love Kerri, which premiered on Sky Angel in June 2007. She starred in the comedy movie Engaged that also premiered on the Sky Angel network. Pomarolli was featured in the documentary Hollywood on Fire, where she talked about the condition of faith in the entertainment industry. In 2013, Pomarolli hosted the California Women's Conference. She has a recurring role on Nick Mom Night Out. She was voted Comedian of the year by the LA Red Letter Awards 2023. She hosted the Female Songwriters Hall of Fame awards 2023. She wrote two films for the Hallmark Channel. She appeared on the Cover of Guideposts magazine 2025. She had a successful Dry Bar Comedy Special. She appeared on The BabyLon Bee several times.

=== Writer ===
In 2008, she published her book titled If I’m Waiting on God, Then What Am I Doing in a Christian Chatroom?; in which she wrote true stories of her online dating experience. The book was later published under the name Guys Like Girls Named Jennie. Pomarolli's second book was titled How to Ruin Your Dating Life. Her book "Guys Like Girls Named Jennie", about her life, is slated to be a motion picture pending details 2016/2017. She is a monthly columnist for the magazine "WHOA women" and a featured columnist in many publications nationally.

She writes a bimonthly advice column Confessions in the magazine Radiant, in Positive Reactions magazine, and is a contributing writer for Hope For Women. Pomarolli also writes a monthly column Report From A Hollywood God Girl in The Chronicle Newspapers a national publication for which she won a writing award. Her latest book, Moms Night Out came out with the movie of the same name. In 2015, she co-wrote and produced the stage musical The Quarter Slot Sisterhood, based on the book by her mother Barbara Pomarolli. The show opened at The Actor's Co-op Theater. She continues to develop new film projects.

== Personal life ==
She has two daughters who live with her in Los Angeles. She moved to Northern Ca in 2022. She was married to comedian Ron McGehee until 2015.

== Bibliography ==
- Guys Like Girls Named Jennie
- How to Ruin Your Dating Life, A Christian's Guide for Avoiding [Almost] Every Mistake in the Book
- It's Not Me It's You (contributing writer)
- Relevant Nation 50 Revolutionaries Under 40 (co-writer)
- Two Comics Walk into a Church
- Mom's Night Out and Other Things I Miss (Writer)
- Kickin It Old School (iTunes)
- #INeedAttention (iTunes)
- How to Be a Pitbull for Jesus (DVD)
- Clean Comedy Strikes Back (iTunes)
- Thoughts In My Head (Dry Bar)
- Proverbs 32 Woman Book
- She Rises Late and Her Kids Make Her Breakfast Book
- The Carpool Comedy Podcast ITunes
