= Silk Road (2021 film) =

2021 American crime thriller film

- Theatrical release poster
- Directed by: Tiller Russell
- Written by: Tiller Russell
- Based on: “Dead End on Silk Road” by David Kushner
- Produced by: Christopher Figg; Alex Orlovsky; Robert Whitehouse; Elika Portnoy; Jack Selby; Duncan Montgomery; David Hyman; Dawn Bierschwal; Stephen Gans
- Starring: Jason Clarke; Nick Robinson; Will Ropp; Alexandra Shipp; Jimmi Simpson
- Cinematography: Peter Flinckenberg
- Edited by: Greg O'Bryant
- Music by: Mondo Boys
- Production companies: Perfect Season Productions; High Frequency Entertainment; Piccadilly Pictures; Mutressa Movies
- Distributed by: Lionsgate
- Release date: February 19, 2021 (United States)
- Running time: 112 minutes
- Country: United States
- Language: English
- Budget: $5.99 million
- Box office: $138,565

Silk Road is a 2021 American crime thriller film written and directed by Tiller Russell, based on the Rolling Stone article "Dead End on Silk Road: Internet Crime Kingpin Ross Ulbricht's Big Fall" by David Kushner. The film stars Jason Clarke, Nick Robinson, Alexandra Shipp, Jimmi Simpson, Paul Walter Hauser, Darrell Britt-Gibson, and Will Ropp. It is based on the true story of Ross Ulbricht, who develops a website on the darknet, an act which attracts the attention of the FBI and DEA, who send in federal agent Richard "Rick" Bowden, a fictional composite of real life DEA Special Agent Carl Force and US Secret Service Special Agent Shaun Bridges, both of whom were convicted of felonies related to theft of assets in the investigation of Ulbricht, to bring down his empire.

Silk Road was released in the United States on February 19, 2021 by Lionsgate.

== Plot ==
The film begins with Ross Ulbricht's arrest in San Francisco in 2013. It then delves into Ross's background, portraying him as a well-educated aspiring entrepreneur living in Austin, Texas. Ross comes up with the idea for Silk Road as a way to challenge government control and regulations, believing in the idea of taking back liberty. He starts the website to allow anonymous buying and selling of illegal goods using cryptocurrencies, and it flourishes, with Ross making millions by facilitating the sale of illegal items such as drugs, weapons, and identity information. Julia connects him with a contact at Gawker in order to drive interest in the site, and though the plan works, the increased attention leads to

Meanwhile, DEA agent Rick Bowden has returned to work following a mandated stay in rehab after abusing drugs. Despite having little experience with technology, he is punished with a reassignment to the cybercrimes unit, where he is instructed to wait out nine months until he can retire with a full pension. Unwilling to merely languish, Rick begins to investigate Silk Road by registering and posing as a regular user, though his findings are ignored or dismissed by his superiors and colleagues, who are much younger and mock his seemingly outdated methodology and tactics. He is eventually assigned to an FBI task force unit dedicated to taking down Silk Road and tracking down Ross.

Rick manages to ingratiate himself with Ross, building a friendship with him over Silk Road chatrooms with the help of the more tech-savvy Rayford, a former informant that Rick had blackmailed into lending assistance. After Ross hires Curtis Clark Green, a longtime user and seller on Silk Road, as Silk Road's sole employee, the task force manages to track down Green. Rick apprehends Green, and Ross grows increasingly panicked as Green apparently disappears. Rick, posing as a disinterested third party, offers to assist, and Ross agrees. After squeezing information about Silk Road and Ross from Green through torturous interrogation, Rick manipulates Ross into ordering Green's murder (which he feigns) while privately using Green to steal cryptocurrency from Silk Road's escrow.

Both Ross and Rick's personal lives begin to fray: Julia, already having become disillusioned with Silk Road's impact on poor communities after learning that crystal meth and crack cocaine are being sold there, breaks up with Ross for good after he grows increasingly paranoid and obsessed. Ross also begins to question his own mission after learning of a teenager who died while taking drugs purchased from Silk Road. Meanwhile, Rick's investigation puts an emotional and financial strain on his family as he remains engrossed in the case.

Ross begins to rely on Rick as a fixer, with Rick even showing up to his apartment incognito to coach him upon learning that FBI agents will be coming to his address for questioning after intercepting forged passports that he purchased from Silk Road. Cognizant that he will be arrested for his involvement once Ross is captured, Rick extorts Ross for hundreds of thousands of dollars by posing as both a hacker and hitman offering to dispose of said hacker, intent on providing for his family while he is in prison.

The FBI task force, completely unaware of Rick's activities, eventually close in on Ross, and he is arrested in a public library. Rick is arrested not long afterwards, though not before confronting his superiors and warning that actors like Ross will soon be running the world. Ross and Rick are both sentenced to prison, where Ross passes Rick by chance one day and stares after him in disbelief.

== Cast ==
- Jason Clarke as Richard "Rick" Bowden aka "Jurassic Narc"
- Nick Robinson as Ross Ulbricht
- Alexandra Shipp as Julia Vie
- Jimmi Simpson as Chris Tarbell
- Paul Walter Hauser as Curtis Clark Green
- Darrell Britt-Gibson as Rayford
- Katie Aselton as Sandy Bowden
- Lexi Rabe as Edie Bowden
- Daniel David Stewart as Max
- Will Ropp as Shields
- Jennifer Yun as FBI Agent Kim Yum
- David DeLao as Johnny Marales
- Raleigh Cain as Callie

== Production ==
In January 2019, it was announced Jason Clarke and Nick Robinson had joined the cast of the film, with Tiller Russell directing from a screenplay he wrote. In May 2019, Cole Sprouse, Darrell Britt-Gibson and Jimmi Simpson joined the cast of the film. In June 2019, Paul Walter Hauser, Katie Aselton and Lexi Rabe joined the cast of the film. That same month, Daniel David Stewart joined the cast of the film, replacing Sprouse.

Principal photography began in June 2019 in Albuquerque, New Mexico.

== Release ==
Silk Road was scheduled to have its world premiere at the Tribeca Film Festival on April 16, 2020. However, due to the COVID-19 pandemic. the festival was postponed. In December 2020, Lionsgate acquired U.S. distribution rights to the film, and set it for a February 19, 2021, release.

=== Reception ===
Review aggregator Rotten Tomatoes gives the film a 52% approval rating based on 64 reviews, with an average rating of 5.60/10. The website's critics consensus reads: "Silk Road draws intriguing parallels between its oppositional main characters, but doesn't do quite enough to develop the story surrounding them." According to Metacritic, which sampled 11 critics and calculated a weighted average score of 41 out of 100, the film received "mixed or average reviews".

== See also ==
- Deep Web
- Ross Ulbricht
