= List of The Late Late Show with James Corden episodes (2021) =

- No. of episodes: 153

Release
- Original network: CBS
- Original release: January 4 – December 16, 2021

Season chronology
- ← Previous; 2020 episodes Next → 2022 episodes

This is the list of episodes for The Late Late Show with James Corden in 2021.

== 2021 ==
=== January ===
| No. | Original release date | Guest(s) | Musical/entertainment guest(s) |
|---|---|---|---|
| 853 | January 4, 2021 | Rosario Dawson | Ingrid Andress |
Trump Tried to Shakedown Some Georgia Fellas
| 854 | January 5, 2021 | James Marsden | Tim Minchin |
Diane Keaton Look-Alike Challenge
| 855 | January 6, 2021 | Jim Gaffigan | Seventeen |
Reaction to the 2021 United States Capitol attack
| 856 | January 7, 2021 | Michael Sheen, Jo Ellen Pellman | N/A |
Hitting Trump with the 25th
| 857 | January 11, 2021 | Rob Lowe | Zoe Wees |
Can They Play?
| 858 | January 12, 2021 | Liam Neeson, Annaleigh Ashford | Pillow Queens |
Trump #1 in Impeachments
| 859 | January 13, 2021 | Paul Bettany, Lennie James | N/A |
Like Us On...
| 860 | January 14, 2021 | Michael Moore, Andie MacDowell | Why Don't We |
Trump Is Giving Rudy the Ol' Stiff!
| 861 | January 19, 2021 | Anthony Mackie | Machine Gun Kelly |
One Day More (Les Misérables Parody)
| 862 | January 20, 2021 | Dakota Johnson | AJR |
Honest Headlines
| 863 | January 21, 2021 | Regina King, Amanda Gorman | Quinn XCII featuring Chelsea Cutler |
Superhero or Superzero
| 864 | January 24, 2021 | Rob Gronkowski, Joe Montana, Stephen Curry | N/A |
Special live episode airing after AFC Championship Game
| 865 | January 25, 2021 | Halsey, Penn & Teller | N/A |
Apple Watch Hidden Features
| 866 | January 26, 2021 | Jared Leto | Jacob Collier |
Celebrity Instagram
| 867 | January 27, 2021 | Adam DeVine | BLACKPINK |
Susan or Someone Else
| 868 | January 28, 2021 | Carey Mulligan | Jhené Aiko |
Tonight I Learned

=== February ===
| No. | Original release date | Guest(s) | Musical/entertainment guest(s) |
|---|---|---|---|
| 869 | February 1, 2021 | Viggo Mortensen | Quinn XCII featuring Chelsea Cutler |
Shawn Mendes Error
| 870 | February 2, 2021 | Naomi Watts | FINNEAS |
Mysterious Grape on Desk
| 871 | February 3, 2021 | Kal Penn | Josh Groban |
Secret Word
| 872 | February 4, 2021 | Dan Stevens | Michael Kiwanuka |
Dogs in Sunglasses
| 873 | February 8, 2021 | Salma Hayek, Owen Wilson | The Weeknd |
James Saving the Super Bowl Halftime Show
| 874 | February 9, 2021 | Rob Gronkowski, Elle Fanning | Sabrina Carpenter |
Gronk Didn't Get a Super Bowl Burrito
| 875 | February 10, 2021 | Noah Centineo | Madison Cunningham |
Noah Centi Yay-Or-No
| 876 | February 11, 2021 | Mila Kunis | Robin Thicke |
Cupid Hits Rock Bottom
| 877 | February 22, 2021 | Kristen Wiig & Annie Mumolo | Masego featuring Don Toliver |
Honest Headlines
| 878 | February 23, 2021 | Drew Barrymore, Storm Reid | N/A |
Drew Barry-More or Less
| 879 | February 24, 2021 | Stanley Tucci | Pentatonix |
Original Cast of The Crown
| 880 | February 25, 2021 | Jodie Foster | Holly Humberstone |
Spending the Afternoon with Prince Harry

=== March ===
| No. | Original release date | Guest(s) | Musical/entertainment guest(s) |
|---|---|---|---|
| 881 | March 1, 2021 | Jamie Dornan, Kelly Marie Tran | N/A |
Forbidden Relationships
| 882 | March 2, 2021 | Tom Brady, Stacey Abrams | JP Saxe featuring Maren Morris |
Tom Brady Is Foggy on the Trophy Toss
| 883 | March 3, 2021 | Ben Schwartz | Foo Fighters |
Tonight I Learned
| 884 | March 4, 2021 | Daisy Ridley | Caroline Polachek |
Corden's Crazy Wheel Of Kooky Craziness & Mondo Bonkers
| 885 | March 8, 2021 | Andra Day | SG Lewis featuring Nile Rodgers |
Face Your Mother: "I Was a Phone Sex Operator"
| 886 | March 9, 2021 | Tracy Morgan | Kings of Leon |
Major Biden's Been a Bad Boy
| 887 | March 10, 2021 | Trevor Noah | Grouplove |
Nobody Makes an Entrance Like Trevor Noah
| 888 | March 11, 2021 | Eddie Murphy | Tiana Major9 |
Parody Songs Worth Less Than 10 Seconds Of Your Time
| 889 | March 15, 2021 | Venus Williams | Picture This |
Leave The TV On, Pop Culture Pop Quiz
| 890 | March 16, 2021 | Senator Chuck Schumer | Sam Smith |
Somewhere In Here Is Our Monologue
| 891 | March 17, 2021 | Allison Janney | Inhaler |
Anti-Asian Hate Crimes Must Be Addressed
| 892 | March 18, 2021 | Benedict Cumberbatch | Justin Bieber |
Writer Stuck In Rafters
| 893 | March 22, 2021 | David Tennant | Joy Downer |
Is Trump the Next Zuckerberg with His Social Comeback?
| 894 | March 23, 2021 | Bear Grylls | Middle Kids |
6th Anniversary Show, Reggie's Birthday Salad Machine
| 895 | March 24, 2021 | Minnie Driver | Benny Blanco featuring Gracie Abrams |
Producer Dave & Patti LuPone Brunch Date
| 896 | March 25, 2021 | Chrissy Teigen | NEEDTOBREATHE |
Spill Your Guts Or Fill Your Guts

=== April ===
| No. | Original release date | Guest(s) | Musical/entertainment guest(s) |
|---|---|---|---|
| 897 | April 5, 2021 | Bob Odenkirk | The Fratellis |
Like Us On...
| 898 | April 6, 2021 | Neil deGrasse Tyson | Arlo Parks |
Condiment Debate
| 899 | April 7, 2021 | Kenan Thompson | Julien Baker |
Record Collection
| 900 | April 8, 2021 | Jeffrey Dean Morgan | London Grammar |
900th Episode Celebration
| 901 | April 12, 2021 | Rainn Wilson | Tom Odell |
Pop Culture Pop Quiz
| 902 | April 13, 2021 | Vanessa Kirby | Darren Criss |
Bad Bunny Vs. Good Bunny
| 903 | April 14, 2021 | Keith Urban | Jon Batiste |
Tonight I Learned
| 904 | April 15, 2021 | Forest Whitaker | Kane Brown |
Susan Or Someone Else?
| 905 | April 19, 2021 | Ron Funches | Karol G |
Celebrity Noses
| 906 | April 20, 2021 | Angela Bassett | KSI featuring Yungblud and Polo G |
Pitching Oprah A Big Idea
| 907 | April 21, 2021 | Cher | Jackson Wang |
Get Wiggy Wit It
| 908 | April 22, 2021 | Dominic Cooper | Static & Ben El featuring Black Eyed Peas |
Earth Day Interview
| 909 | April 26, 2021 | Pete Buttigieg | Jordan McGraw |
Voiced Mortal Kombat Song
| 910 | April 27, 2021 | Zion Williamson | Years & Years |
Apple Watch Hidden Features
| 911 | April 28, 2021 | Jason Schwartzman | Gabby Barrett |
Louie Buys NFT & Quits
| 912 | April 29, 2021 | Brian Tyree Henry | Tom Grennan |
Emoji News

=== May ===
| No. | Original release date | Guest(s) | Musical/entertainment guest(s) |
|---|---|---|---|
| 913 | May 3, 2021 | Tiffany Haddish | Dominic Fike |
Side Effects Of Rejoining Society
| 914 | May 4, 2021 | Ellen DeGeneres | Wolf Alice |
Negotiations Of Shows Airing From Cruise Ship
| 915 | May 5, 2021 | Billy Porter, Brett Gelman | N/A |
Honest Headlines
| 916 | May 6, 2021 | Max Greenfield | Alec Benjamin |
Side Effects May Include
| 917 | May 10, 2021 | David Oyelowo | Maisie Peters |
Cruise Ships/Late Late Show Offer
| 918 | May 11, 2021 | Martin Freeman | Rag'n'Bone Man |
Dogs in Sunglasses
| 919 | May 12, 2021 | Sharon Stone, Matthew Rhys | N/A |
Cruise Ship Plans
| 920 | May 13, 2021 | Ben Platt | Ben Platt |
Are We Getting Too Comfortable as a Show?
| 921 | May 17, 2021 | President Barack Obama | Kelly Rowland |
Life Advice with President Obama
| 922 | May 18, 2021 | Regina Hall | Moby |
Celebrity Instagram
| 923 | May 19, 2021 | Eric Bana, Pete Holmes | N/A |
The Trump Organization Probe Heats Up!
| 924 | May 20, 2021 | Hank Azaria | Sara Bareilles |
LLS Weekends: Nude Beaches & 7a Bike Rides
| 925 | May 24, 2021 | Don Cheadle, Rafe Spall | N/A |
Honest Headlines
| 926 | May 25, 2021 | Andrew Rannells | All Time Low |
More or Less the 80's
| 927 | May 26, 2021 | Jonas Brothers | Leif Vollebekk |
Disney Origin Stories with Jonas Brothers
| 928 | May 27, 2021 | Emily Blunt | Elle King |
Can't They Sing

=== June ===
| No. | Original release date | Guest(s) | Musical/entertainment guest(s) |
|---|---|---|---|
| 929 | June 7, 2021 | Julianne Moore | Rufus Wainwright |
Tonight I Learned
| 930 | June 8, 2021 | Chelsea Handler | The Wallflowers |
Can Chelsea Handle It?
| 931 | June 9, 2021 | Lisa Kudrow, Clea DuVall | Rostam |
Starbucks Summer Daydream
| 932 | June 10, 2021 | Desus & Mero | Mother Mother |
Mother Face-Off
| 933 | June 14, 2021 | Hugh Grant, Mike Colter | TXT |
New Dad
| 934 | June 15, 2021 | Governor Gavin Newsom, Migos | N/A |
No Lockdowns Anymore
| 935 | June 16, 2021 | Margot Robbie, Rose Byrne | Polo G |
Visiting The Cast Of Friends
| 936 | June 17, 2021 | Will Arnett | Lord Huron |
Honest Headlines/Buble Bubbly Bar
| 937 | June 21, 2021 | Helen Hunt | Black Pumas |
Nick Bernstein New Hairstyle
| 938 | June 22, 2021 | Elizabeth Olsen, Edgar Wright | N/A |
Recap Of Every Fast & Furious Movie
| 939 | June 23, 2021 | Josh Gad | Chloe Moriondo |
2 Hours With
| 940 | June 24, 2021 | Liam Neeson | Anthony Ramos |
Ed Sheeran Preps For Next Week
| 941 | June 28, 2021 | Ed Sheeran | Ed Sheeran |
1st Guest Door Chat In 15 Months
| 942 | June 29, 2021 | Steve Buscemi | Ed Sheeran |
Two Hours With
| 943 | June 30, 2021 | Heidi Klum | Ed Sheeran |
Side Effects May Include

=== July ===
| No. | Original release date | Guest(s) | Musical/entertainment guest(s) |
|---|---|---|---|
| 944 | July 1, 2021 | Chris Pratt | Ed Sheeran |
Chris Pratt Takes Over For Ian Karmel

=== August ===
| No. | Original release date | Guest(s) | Musical/entertainment guest(s) |
|---|---|---|---|
| 945 | August 23, 2021 | Jason Momoa | Lorde |
The Lorde Lorde Show
| 946 | August 24, 2021 | Lorde | Lorde |
Parody Songs Worth Less Than 10 Cents Of Your Time
| 947 | August 25, 2021 | Bradley Whitford | Lorde |
Pop Culture Pop Quiz
| 948 | August 26, 2021 | Terry Crews | Lorde |
Plan To Promote Small Businesses
| 949 | August 30, 2021 | Camila Cabello | Rufus Du Sol |
Dogs In Sunglasses
| 950 | August 31, 2021 | Lil Rel Howery, Billie Piper | N/A |
Should Show Be More French?

=== September ===
| No. | Original release date | Guest(s) | Musical/entertainment guest(s) |
|---|---|---|---|
| 951 | September 1, 2021 | Clive Owen | James Arthur |
2021 Summer Recap
| 952 | September 2, 2021 | David Duchovny | The Killers |
Crosswalk The Musical: Cinderella
| 953 | September 7, 2021 | Patrick Stewart | Vance Joy |
Julius Jones Needs Our Help
| 954 | September 8, 2021 | Ron Funches | Justin Quiles |
Carpool Karaoke: The Cast of Cinderella
| 955 | September 9, 2021 | Dr. Phil McGraw | Teddy Swims |
Reggie's Song To Jockey Boss & His Horse
| 956 | September 13, 2021 | Drew Barrymore, Mary Elizabeth Winstead | N/A |
Goodnight Song
| 957 | September 14, 2021 | Cobie Smulders, Regina Hall | N/A |
Tribute To Norm Macdonald, Apple Watch Hidden Features
| 958 | September 15, 2021 | Cedric the Entertainer, Gillian Anderson | N/A |
Recap Of Impeachment: American Crime Story
| 959 | September 16, 2021 | Angela Bassett | NCT 127 |
Reggie Runs Late
| 960 | September 20, 2021 | Ken Jeong | Lola Young |
Justice For Julius Jones
| 961 | September 21, 2021 | Joseph Gordon-Levitt, Suni Lee | N/A |
Record Collection
| 962 | September 22, 2021 | Nicole Kidman, Melissa McCarthy, Bill Gates | N/A |
Climate Night
| 963 | September 23, 2021 | Ben Platt | Ben Platt |
Take A Break
| 964 | September 27, 2021 | Khloe Kardashian | Jade Bird |
Eye Candy
| 965 | September 28, 2021 | Mayim Bialik, Gillian Jacobs | N/A |
Director's 5,000th Show
| 966 | September 29, 2021 | Tyra Banks, Leslie Odom Jr. | N/A |
"Impeachment: American Crime Story" Recap
| 967 | September 30, 2021 | Andy Serkis, Beth Behrs | N/A |
US Curling Team vs. Late Late Show All Stars

=== October ===
| No. | Original release date | Guest(s) | Musical/entertainment guest(s) |
|---|---|---|---|
| 968 | October 4, 2021 | Jamie Lee Curtis, Ludacris | Lord Huron |
Post FB/IG Outage
| 969 | October 5, 2021 | Taraji P. Henson, Gabrielle Union | Jake Wesley Rogers |
Who Would Fight Who On Our Staff?
| 970 | October 6, 2021 | Judy Greer, Annaleigh Ashford | Cat Power |
Look, Not Every Episode We Make Is a Classic
| 971 | October 7, 2021 | Daniel Craig, Rami Malek | N/A |
Blockbuster Role Call
| 972 | October 18, 2021 | Dave Grohl, Kate Beckinsale | Coldplay featuring Selena Gomez |
Nick's Horse Racing Dreams Came True
| 973 | October 19, 2021 | Hailee Steinfeld, Lee Pace | Coldplay |
The Masked Killer
| 974 | October 20, 2021 | Jamie Foxx | Coldplay featuring We Are KING and Jacob Collier |
Pop Culture Singer
| 975 | October 21, 2021 | Larry David | Coldplay |
Life Advice, Lawrence Dai's Last Show
| 976 | October 25, 2021 | Anya Taylor-Joy, Ben Schwartz | Leon Bridges |
Trip To Six Flags
| 977 | October 26, 2021 | David Boreanaz, Melanie C | Finneas |
James Corden's Still Confused By Thanksgiving Food
| 978 | October 27, 2021 | Jeffrey Wright, Edgar Wright | Glass Animals |
Audience Errands
| 979 | October 28, 2021 | Andie MacDowell, Rudi Dharmalingam | Calum Scott |
Nick Bernstein Takes Lie Detector Test

=== November ===
| No. | Original release date | Guest(s) | Musical/entertainment guest(s) |
|---|---|---|---|
| 980 | November 1, 2021 | Dr. Anthony Fauci, Nick Kroll, Patton Oswalt | N/A |
Nov. 1 Christmas Music: Red or Green Light?
| 981 | November 2, 2021 | Anna Kendrick, O'Shea Jackson Jr. | Atsuko Okatsuka |
Celebrity Noses
| 982 | November 3, 2021 | Eva Longoria, J. B. Smoove | Anitta featuring Saweetie |
James Corden Isn't Ready For Metaverse
| 983 | November 4, 2021 | Jack McBrayer, Alexandra Shipp | Angels & Airwaves |
Taller Or Shorter
| 984 | November 8, 2021 | Tig Notaro, Dr. Michael Eric Dyson | MUNA featuring Phoebe Bridgers |
Writer Comes Cleans to Parents About HornyTees.Biz
| 985 | November 9, 2021 | Gal Gadot, Henry Lloyd-Hughes | Tori Kelly |
James Is a Different Man w/ a Toothpick
| 986 | November 10, 2021 | Dwayne Johnson | Avril Lavigne |
Karaoke, Tequila, & Hanging With Dwayne Johnson
| 987 | November 11, 2021 | Andrew Garfield, Jamie Dornan | Laurie Kilmartin |
Shock Therapy Quiz
| 988 | November 15, 2021 | John Lithgow, Jack Whitehall | King Calaway |
No More Karmel's Corner
| 989 | November 16, 2021 | Mindy Kaling, Yvonne Orji | Majid Jordan |
LLS Staff Thanksgiving Side Dish Showdown
| 990 | November 17, 2021 | Kirsten Dunst, John Cho | Trey Wakeman |
Tonight I Learned
| 991 | November 18, 2021 | Salma Hayek, Keith Urban | Keith Urban |
Celebrity Instagram
| 992 | November 22, 2021 | Adrien Brody, Zazie Beetz | Little Simz |
| 993 | November 23, 2021 | Nicholas Hoult, Aisling Bea | BTS |
| 994 | November 24, 2021 | Jeff Goldblum, Caitriona Balfe | Sophie Buddle |
Thanksgiving Plans, Audience Q&A
| 995 | November 30, 2021 | Kristin Chenoweth, Kal Penn | Kristin Chenoweth |
Stephen Sondheim Tribute

=== December ===
| No. | Original release date | Guest(s) | Musical/entertainment guest(s) |
|---|---|---|---|
| 996 | December 1, 2021 | Octavia Spencer, Max Greenfield | Travis |
We're Dreaming Of A Starbucks Winter Wonderland
| 997 | December 2, 2021 | Bill Burr, Glenn Howerton | Meghan Trainor |
| 998 | December 6, 2021 | Zachary Levi, Nicole Byer | Nnena |
Late Late Live Tinder
| 999 | December 7, 2021 | Ansel Elgort, Jane Levy | Blair Socci |
Beatles Member You've Never Met, Fred Smith's Retirement
| 1000 | December 8, 2021 | Mariah Carey | BTS |
1000th Show Enshrinement, Staff's Favorite Moments
| 1001 | December 9, 2021 | Governor Gavin Newsom, Hannah Waddingham | She & Him |
| 1002 | December 13, 2021 | Katie Couric, Zach Woods | Dave Gahan & Soulsavers |
Santa Brought The Dip & Let It Rip
| 1003 | December 14, 2021 | Dwyane Wade, Tessa Thompson | Andrew Michaan |
Shooting Hoops
| 1004 | December 15, 2021 | RuPaul, Ariana DeBose | Jimmie Allen |
Breaking Down 2021
| 1005 | December 16, 2021 | Kristin Davis, Chloë Grace Moretz | N/A |
Crosswalk Concert: BTS
