= Taylor Mason =

American comedian (born 1956)

- Born: Franklin Taylor Mason; February 22, 1956 (age 70)
- Notable work: Bananas, Thou Shalt Laugh
- Spouse: Marsia Mason

Comedy career
- Genres: Ventriloquist, comedian, and musician
- Website: taylormason.com

Franklin Taylor Mason (born February 22, 1956) is a comedian, ventriloquist and musician.

== Early life ==
Mason was raised on a farm in the suburb of Chicago, where his father was a farm news broadcaster on radio and TV. Mason graduated from the Ottawa Township Highschool in 1974 and went on to attend the University of Illinois where he majored in agriculture and communication. Mason graduated from the University of Illinois in 1979. He was first introduced to puppets by his parents at the age of 9.

== Career ==
While Mason was attending the University of Illinois, he suffered a knee injury during a football game. During recovery Mason started performing as a disc-jockey and stand-up comedian at his fraternity. He mixed up his act by adding music, piano and ventriloquism to it. He soon started performing at various Chicago piano bars. According to Mason, when he started out as a comedian, he was the only ventriloquist in Chicago.

In 1981, Mason was hired as the musical director of "The Second City Touring Company", a comedy improv group where Mason worked alongside other comedians such as Dan Castellaneta. While working at "The Second City Touring Company", Mason also met his future wife Marisa.

Mason continued his ventriloquist act and also worked on his Masters in advertising. He graduated with a degree from the Northwestern University in 1983. By the end of his time at Northwestern, Mason was working full time as a comedian and performing at the Zanies Comedy Club in Chicago.

From 1986 to 1989, Mason performed comedy shows at the New York City's Catch a Rising Star. By 1990, Mason started appearing on comedy television shows. During a period of 11 years starting from 1989, Mason did over 1,500 college shows across the country.

In 1990, Mason auditioned for Star Search and later on he won the competition in 1991. Currently, Mason is working on his Dry Bar Comedy Series.

Mason has authored two books on ventriloquism. He wrote his first book, A Complete Idiot's Guide to Ventriloquism, while he was working at the Second City Touring Company. His second book titled "Irreversible" was published in 2019.

== Personal life ==
Mason lives with his wife in Beach Haven, New Jersey. The couple have two adult sons.
