= Lumi Pollack =

American actress (born 2009)

- Born: Lumi Ella Pollack; January 18, 2009 (age 17); Aventura, Florida, U.S
- Occupation: Actress
- Years active: 2019–present

Lumi Ella Pollack (born January 18, 2009) is an American actress. She is best known for her roles in The Fallout (2021) as Amelia Cavell, in Autumn and the Black Jaguar (2024) as Autumn Edison, in Electric Bloom (2025) as Posey Parker and in Camp Rock 3 (2026) as Rosie.

== Early life ==
Lumi Ella Pollack was born in Aventura, Florida, on January 18, 2009, to Richard and Emi Pollack. She is of Japanese, Colombian and Jewish descent. She became interested in acting and singing after going to a performing arts sleepaway camp at the age of 8 in 2017.

== Career ==
Pollack's first onscreen role was Amelia Cavell in The Fallout (2021). In 2024, she starred in Autumn and the Black Jaguar as Autumn and voiced Westyn/Wanessa in Dee & Friends in Oz.

In 2025, she made her debut as Posey Parker in Electric Bloom (2025–present). In September 2025, it was announced that Pollack was cast as Rosie in Camp Rock 3 (2026).

== Filmography ==
=== Film ===
Year	Title	Role	Notes
2019	The Kid's New Years Party!	Loomie	Short film
2021	The Fallout	Amelia Cavell	
2024	Autumn and the Black Jaguar	Autumn Edison	
2025	One Big Happy Family	Sammie	
2026	Camp Rock 3	Rosie	

=== Television ===
Year	Title	Role	Notes
2021	Sydney to the Max	Jordan	Episode: A Few Good Mentors
2022	Class of 1970	Josie	2 episodes
2024	Dee & Friends in Oz	Westyn/Wanessa (voices)	Main role
2025	Electric Bloom	Posey Parker	Main role
2026	Chibi Tiny Tales	Herself	Episode: "Camp Rock 2: As Told By Chibi"
2026	Locker Diaries: Camp Rock	Rosie	6 episodes
