= John Branyan =

American comedian and writer

- Notable work: Shakespearean The Three Little Pigs / A Triune Tale of Diminutive Swine; Wedlocked
- Spouse: Lori Branyan
- Children: Mandy, Tim, Tabby and Andrew

Comedy career
- Years active: yes
- Medium: Stand-up, television, theatre
- Genres: Observational, anecdotal, clean
- Website: johnbranyan.com

John Branyan (born 1965) is an American comedian and writer. He is known for his clean stand-up comedy.

== Career ==
Branyan has been a professional comedian since prior to 1997. Although best known for performing stand-up comedy, he also performs improv comedy with the troupe Think Tank. He has written for the American Comedy Network. He co-wrote and performed in the theatrical presentation, Crazy Love, which was on a national tour for three years.

He has participated in Jay Leno's National Comedy Competition and has been featured on nine recorded comedy projects with people like Ken Davis, David Jeremiah, Ted Cunningham and Tim Hawkins.

Branyan's mock-Shakespearean version of The Three Little Pigs has been viewed as of January 2017 nearly 2 million times on YouTube.com. His book version, A Triune Tale of Diminutive Swine, is in its third reprinting.

He is the inventor of a comedy writing system, Active Notebook.

== Personal life ==
He and his wife, Lori, have been married since about 1986. (Note: In his 2009 onstage performance Wedlocked (ASIN 1897020716), he stated he has been married 21 years.) They have four children (Mandy, Tim, Tabby and Andrew) and eleven grandchildren. Branyan is a Christian.

He enjoys playing board games and Yars Revenge on his vintage Atari 2600.
