= Dylan Adler =

American comedian, actor, writer, and musician

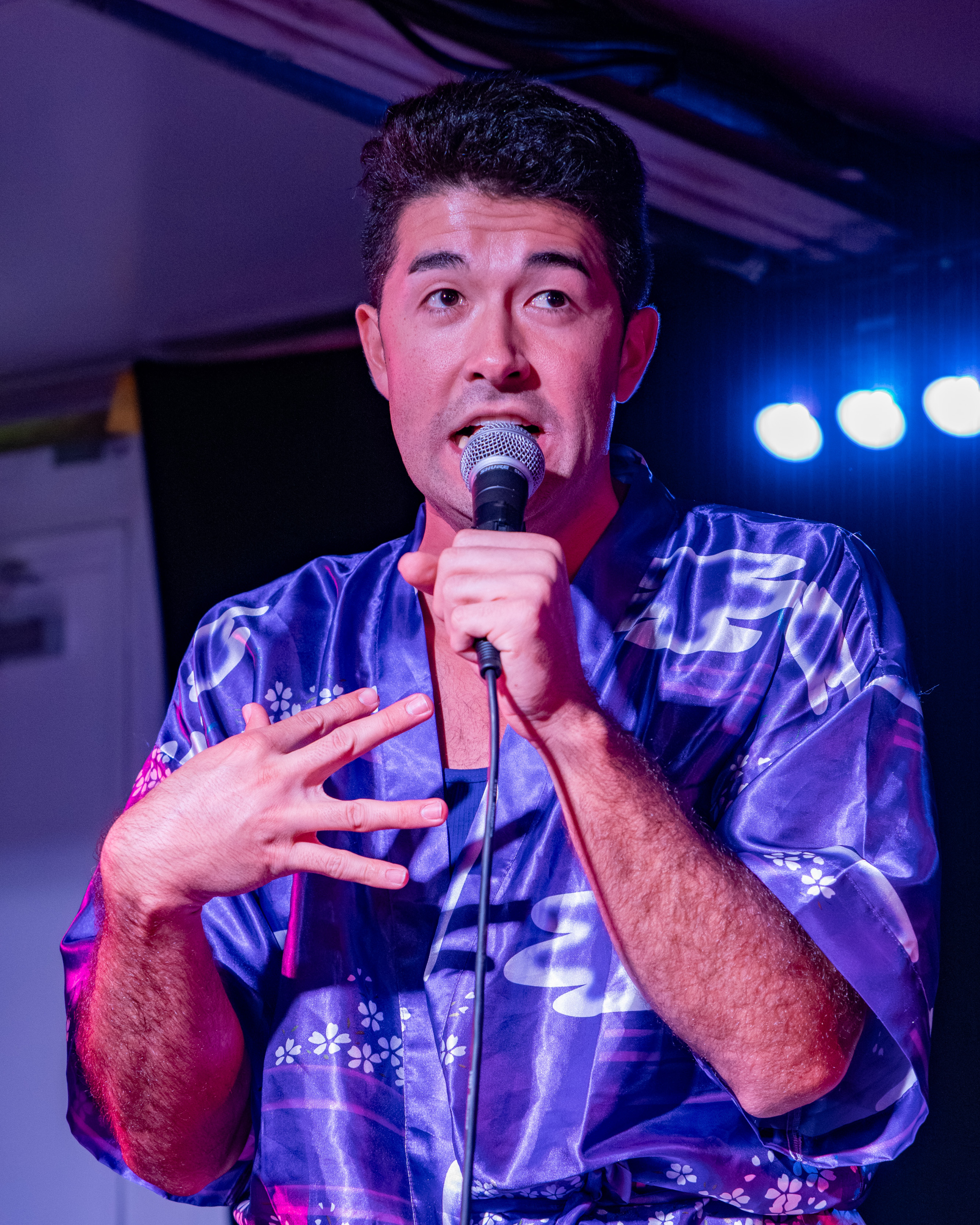
- Adler performing at the 2025 Edinburgh Festival Fringe
- Born: Dylan Akira Adler; 1996 or 1997 (age 29–30); San Rafael, California, U.S.
- Education: NYU Steinhardt (BM)
- Years active: 2018–present

Dylan Akira Adler is an American stand-up comedian, actor, writer, and musician. He was a writer and performer on The Late Late Show with James Corden and was named to Vulture's "Comedians You Should and Will Know" list in 2022. A musical comedian and classically trained pianist, Adler is known for blending songwriting, storytelling, and physical comedy in his live performances.

== Early life and education ==
Adler was born and raised in San Rafael, California, in the San Francisco Bay Area. His mother, who was born in Tokyo, is Japanese American; her family moved to California when she was an infant, and her grandmother's family experienced Japanese American internment during World War II. His father is Jewish. His parents met at UC Berkeley. Adler has an identical twin brother, Max, who is the principal oboist of the Tucson Symphony Orchestra. Both brothers trained as classical pianists and gymnasts growing up.

Adler studied music composition at NYU Steinhardt. He was a recipient of the Alan Menken Scholarship, awarded to emerging musical theater composers by Alan Menken.

== Career ==
=== Early career and musical theater ===
After college, Adler began performing comedy and music in New York City. He performed sketch comedy on Maude Night at the Upright Citizens Brigade Theatre as part of the team "Young Douglas" and performed musical improv on the Peoples Improv Theater house team "Punch Funk" He co-composed the musical Good Morning New York, which was presented at the New York Musical Festival and later played off-Broadway at the Players Theatre in 2020.

=== Rape Victims Are Horny Too ===
Adler co-created the live comedy show Rape Victims Are Horny Too with comedian Kelly Bachman. The two met on the New York comedy scene after both had been performing material about their experiences as sexual assault survivors. They began writing songs together and developed the project into a full-length musical comedy hour. The show, which uses musical comedy and stand-up to address healing from sexual trauma, was covered by The New York Times and Jezebel.

The duo released the show as a comedy album through Comedy Dynamics in September 2022. It was ranked number two on Paste magazine's list of the twelve best comedy albums of 2022. Paste also gave the album a standalone review, praising its mix of vulnerability and humor.

=== The Late Late Show with James Corden ===
Adler served as a writer on The Late Late Show with James Corden, where he also made his late-night television stand-up debut and appeared on camera as a sports correspondent. In interviews, Adler has described the role as well-suited to his musical theater background, as the show frequently featured musical sketches and performances.

=== Stand-up and touring ===
Adler was selected as a Comic to Watch at the New York Comedy Festival in 2021 and was named to Vulture's "Comedians You Should and Will Know" list in 2022. He has performed stand-up on Comedy Central Presents. Adler is also known for his musical impressions, including an impression of Lin-Manuel Miranda that Miranda has reportedly seen and enjoyed.

Adler has toured extensively as an opening act for Atsuko Okatsuka, including dates across the United States and a fourteen-country European tour in early 2025. His solo show Haus of Dy-lan was presented at the Netflix Is a Joke Festival in 2024 and debuted at the Edinburgh Festival Fringe in 2025 at the Pleasance Courtyard.

As of 2025, Adler co-hosts Roomies, a weekly comedy showcase at the Elysian Theater in Los Angeles, with comedian Sam Morrison.
