= Clean comedy =

Comedy genre free from objectionable material

Clean comedy is a comedy genre that is generally free of ribaldry: explicitly sexual content, profanity, politically or racially controversial jokes, toilet humor, and similarly objectionable material. Comedians may try to circumvent clean-comedy restrictions by using innuendos, euphemisms, doublespeak, double entendres, and gender-neutral language. Clean comedy is not necessarily unprovocative.

Clean comedy is considered by some to be a higher form of comedy than bits that rely on the shock of profanity or sexual content to elicit laughs. Bob Newhart said in a Wall Street Journal interview that getting laughs from clean material "is harder. It's just harder... I got a certain satisfaction out of getting a response from the audience and knowing I'd done something that may be harder." David Brenner said "Many who rely on dirty humor do so because vulgar language helps sell weak jokes."

== History ==
Some early comedies, such as the ancient Greek Lysistrata and some of William Shakespeare's plays, could be considered raw and bawdy. The rise of the mass media led to a focus on keeping comedy free from objectionable content to appeal to the largest audience and to advertisers. Comedians such as Bob Hope, Bill Cosby and Bob Newhart were known for clean routines and attracted a wide audience.

In the United States, the Federal Communications Commission's rules against obscenity on broadcast television caused clean comedy to flourish. The rise of cable television and loosening of public attitudes towards the end of the 20th century allowed comedians to be more "edgy" or "filthy" and led to the rise of blue comedy and media personalities like Howard Stern who rely heavily on profanity and sexual content.

== Resurgence ==
Clean comedy experienced a resurgence in the U.S. in the 2000s and 2010s, partly as a reaction against decades of blue comedy. Brian Regan, a comic who decided to turn to clean comedy, said in 2006, "Blue comedy is so commonplace, it's no longer counterculture." He added that while baby boomers might be jazzed by hearing the seven dirty words, young people in the 21st century were so used to hearing profane language that "The fact that something is dirty isn't the enticing part. It also has to be funny."

Jim Gaffigan became very successful in the 2010s on a reputation for being clean, focusing his bits on everyday things like food and raising five children. Corporate conferences, cruise ships, non-profit organizations, schools and churches, and other organizations wanting family-friendly entertainment have also fueled a resurgence in clean comedy. Nate Bargatze has been prominent in the resurgence of clean comedy, and in 2024 he was the highest-grossing comedy performer according to Billboard, with over a million tickets sold across his shows.

A number of outlets have grown to support clean comedy. CleanComedians.com markets a roster of dozens of clean comics for events. Dry Bar Comedy was started in 2017 as an online television series of clean comedy routines and has attracted a large social media following. Studio C racked up over 3 billion views on its YouTube channel as of November 2024 with clean comedy sketches.

== See also ==
- Seven dirty words
- FCC v. Pacifica Foundation
- Federal Communications Commission
- Watershed (broadcasting)
- Political correctness
- Dysphemism
- Loaded language
