= Tim Hawkins =

American comedian and singer (born 1968)

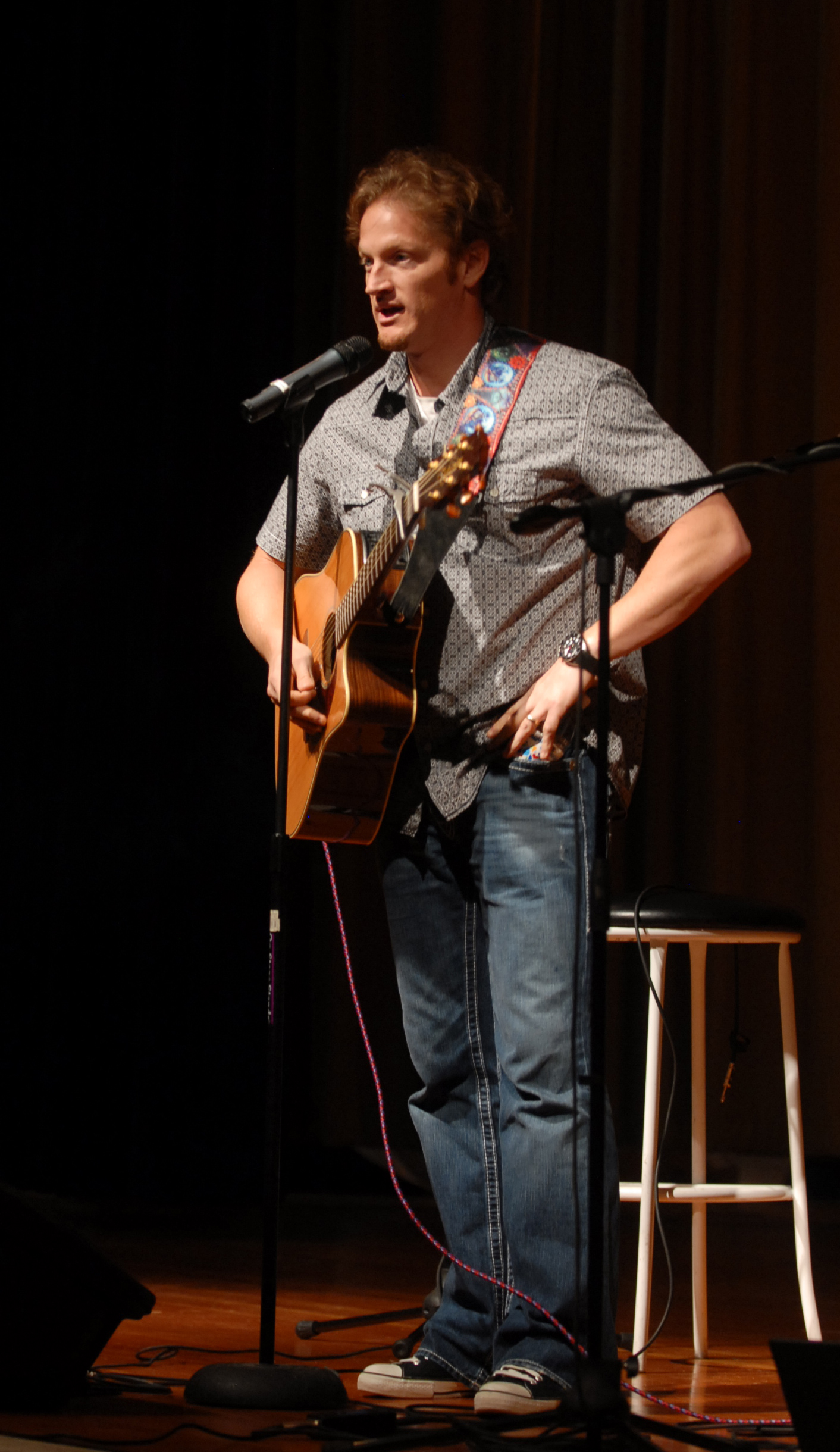
- Hawkins in 2009

Background information
- Born: Timothy Aaron Hawkins; March 30, 1968 (age 58); St. Charles, Missouri, U.S.
- Occupations: Singer, songwriter, comedian
- Years active: 1991–present
- Website: timhawkins.net

Timothy Aaron Hawkins (born March 30, 1968) is an American comedian, songwriter, and musician. His parodies and other comedy clips have gained hundreds of millions of views on YouTube and he tours the United States performing over 100 live concerts per year.

== Early life ==
Hawkins was born in St. Charles, Missouri, 30 miles west of St. Louis. Both of his parents were teachers. His father was a P.E. instructor and his mother taught third grade. He has one brother, Todd Hawkins, who eventually became his first manager. His childhood was consumed with sports, but he also loved making his family and friends laugh. He played baseball at the University of Missouri and assumed he would pursue athletics professionally.

== Career ==
=== Early career ===
After college, Hawkins took any job he could to pay the bills. He rented cars, served as a substitute teacher and also worked a dozen customer support jobs. He also worked as a waiter at Olive Garden, where his co-workers encouraged him to sign up for an open mic night at a local comedy club. It was at this first open mic night in St. Louis in 1991, Hawkins realized he was always meant to do comedy.

=== 2000s and beyond ===
In the early 2000s, Hawkins decided to go into comedy full time. His bits revolved around everyday life. He soon became known for his monologues about homeschooling, marriage and parenting.

Hawkins has recorded over a hundred episodes of his popular "Poddy Break" podcast and currently hosts "The Tim Hawkins" podcast, which also features his wife Heather, daughter Olivia and son-in-law Luke.

== Personal life ==
Hawkins married his wife, Heather, in 1993. They have four children: Spencer (married to Keagan), Olivia (married to Luke), Levi and Jackson. He has one grandson, Holland. He is a Christian.

== Discography ==
=== Studio Albums ===
- My Arms Are Broken (2002)
- Tunafish Sandwich (2002)
- Extremely Madeover (2004)
- Cletus, Take The Reel (2008)
- Pretty Pink Tractor (2011)
- Songs I Did (2026)

== Filmography ==
=== Comedy Specials ===
- Full Range of Motion (2007)
- I'm No Rockstar (2009)
- Insanitized (2010)
- Rockshow Comedy Tour (2011)
- Push Pull Point Pow (2012)
- Greatest Hits & Greatest Bits (2013)
- That's the Worst (2015)
- Just About Enough (2016)
- Fist Bump (2026)
