= Comedic genres =

Types of humor

Comedy can be divided into multiple genres based on the source of humor, the method of delivery, and the context in which it is delivered. These classifications overlap, and most comedians can fit into multiple genres. For example, deadpan comics often fall into observational comedy, or into black comedy or blue comedy to contrast the morbidity, or offensiveness of the joke with a lack of emotion.

== List ==
Genre	Description	Notable examples
Aggressive Humour	Insensitive to audience sentiment by igniting criticism and ridicule on subjects like racism, sexism or anything hurtful; differs from blue humor or dark comedy as it inclines more towards being humorous than being offensive	Daniel Tosh, Brendon Burns, Anthony Jeselnik, Kunal Kamra, Bill Burr, Sarah Silverman, Paul Mooney, Don Rickles, Rufus Hound, George Carlin, Gianmarco Soresi, Bill Hicks, Ricky Gervais, Doug Stanhope, Frankie Boyle, Roseanne Barr, Jon Stewart, Brad Garrett, Denis Leary, Chris Morris, Kelsey Grammer, Patton Oswalt, Ari Shaffir, Lisa Lampanelli, Ian Cognito
Alternative comedy	Differs from traditional punchline jokes which features many other forms of comedy such as observation, satire, surrealism, slapstick and improvisation. In its content, Alternative Comedy emerged as a counter to the establishment entertainment figures from the previous generation: It was often cited for its disregard to established comedic movements and ranged from the surreal to slapstick, usually with a combination of both.	Tony Allen, Alexei Sayle, Mark Steel, Dan Harmon, Dave Gorman, Linda Smith, Jeremy Hardy, Ron Sparks, Alan Davies, Ben Elton, Jo Brand, Stewart Lee, Sean Hughes, Rik Mayall, Adrian Edmondson, Malcolm Hardee, Kristen Schaal, Kelsey Grammer, Kevin McAleer, Simon Munnery, Arthur Smith, Arnold Brown, Robert Newman, Kevin Eldon, James Acaster, Kenny Sebastian, Hannah Gadsby
Anecdotal comedy	Named after the Greek term for anecdote, meaning "unpublished"; personal stories that may be true, or partly true but embellished	Kevin Hart, Louis C.K., Patrice O'Neal, Russell Peters, Aries Spears, Hannibal Buress, Deon Cole, John Mulaney, Bill Burr, Roy Wood Jr., Michael McIntyre, Dave Chappelle, Cedric the Entertainer, Bernie Mac, Gabriel Iglesias, Alonzo Bodden, D. L. Hughley, Jamie Foxx, Peter Kay, Eddie Griffin, Brad Williams, Hasan Minhaj, Patton Oswalt, Jim Gaffigan, Tom Segura, Biswa Kalyan Rath, Colin Jost, Trevor Noah, Daniel Kitson, Danny Baker, Romesh Ranganathan, Chris Rock, Alex Edelman, Zakir Khan, Hiroyuki Miyasako, Theo Von, Annie Lederman, Wanda Sykes, Kathleen Madigan, Tig Notaro
Anti-humor	Indirect humor derived from the comedian delivering something intentionally not funny, or lacking in intrinsic meaning	Andy Kaufman, Andy Samberg, Norm Macdonald, Ted Chippington, John Thomson, Andy Milonakis, Neil Hamburger, Tim & Eric, Eric Andre, Will Ferrell, Edward Aczel, Paul Putner, Richard Herring, Albert Brooks, Steve Martin, Martin Mull, Bill Bailey, Noel Fielding, Mark Silcox, Perry Caravello, Nogla, Beetlejuice
Black comedy or dark comedy	Deals with disturbing subjects such as death, drugs, terrorism, rape, and war; sometimes related to the horror movie genre. Black comedy is usually said by a disliked character.	Jim Norton, Lenny Bruce, Bill Hicks, Dave Chappelle, Frankie Boyle, Jimmy Carr, Louis C.K., Kevin Smith, Denis Leary, Dennis Miller, Monty Python, Richard Pryor, Ricky Gervais, George Carlin, Chris Rush, Jim Jefferies, Mike Ward, Penn & Teller, Norm Macdonald, Christopher Titus, Sacha Baron Cohen, Trey Parker/Matt Stone, Howard Stern, Quentin Tarantino, David Cross, Judah Friedlander, Pete Davidson, Anthony Jeselnik, Daniel Tosh, Seth Rogen/Evan Goldberg, Bobcat Goldthwait, Brendon Burns, Mark Normand, Jerrod Carmichael, Fin Taylor, Dr. Strangelove, Chris Dangerfield, PFFR
Blue comedy	Typically sexual in nature (risqué) and/or using profane; sometimes using gender- or race-based humor.	Samay Raina, Joan Rivers, Dave Attell, Roy 'Chubby' Brown, Frankie Boyle, Jimmy Carr, Dave Chappelle, Cheech & Chong, Jim Davidson, Derek and Clive, Geoffrey Chaucer, Michael Che, Billy Connolly, Jenny Eclair, The Firesign Theatre, Richard Pryor, Redd Foxx, Jason Biggs, Shane Gillis, Lisa Lampanelli, Martin Lawrence, George Lopez, Bernard Manning, Monty Python, Eddie Murphy, Chris Rock, Joe Rogan, Bob Saget, Sarah Silverman, George Carlin, Frank Skinner, Doug Stanhope, Robert Schimmel, Amy Schumer, John Valby, Ron White, Felicia Michaels, William Shakespeare
Burlesque	Nonsensical or ridiculous treatment of serious works of art, music, literature or theatre to make a statement, in a humorous and entertaining way; prior knowledge of the subject is required by the audience	Burlesque, The Play That Goes Wrong, A Modest Proposal, The Rehearsal, Beggar's Opera, The Rape of the Lock, Morgante, O Brother, Where Art Thou?, Tale of Sir Thopas, Chrononhotonthologos
Character comedy	Derived from a persona invented by the performer, often stereotypical	Phyllis Diller, Andy Kaufman, Jim Carrey, Wallace Shawn, Bob Nelson, Catherine Tate, Paul Eddington, Andrew Dice Clay, Rich Hall, Tim Allen, John Gordon Sinclair, BadComedian, Dee Bradley Baker, Rob Paulsen, Lenny Henry, Sacha Baron Cohen, Christopher Ryan, Billy West, Steve Guttenberg, Jeff Bergman, Jerry Sadowitz, Steve Coogan, Fred Armisen, Jay London, Larry the Cable Guy, Adam Sandler, Pete Davidson, Steve Carell, Richard Kind, Maurice LaMarche, Martin Short, Rainn Wilson, Jim Varney, Sarah Silverman, Paul Reubens, Rob Brydon, Rowan Atkinson, Gabriel Iglesias, Peter Helliar, Harry Enfield, Margaret Cho, Matt Lucas/David Walliams, Stephen Colbert, Al Murray, Paul Whitehouse, Charlie Higson, Kevin Hart, Jack Black, Alex Borstein, Leigh Francis, Barry Humphries, Paul O'Grady, Caroline Aherne, Charlie Chaplin, Mary Tyler Moore, Allan Mustafa, Mo Collins, Chris Lilley, Michael McDonald, Kelsey Grammer, Eric Bauza, Kristen Wiig, Vermin Supreme, Andy Lauer, Kate Berlant
Cringe comedy	A comedy of embarrassment derived from inappropriate actions or words; popular in television shows and film, but occasionally in stand-up	Steve Carell, Stephen Colbert, Ricky Gervais, Stephen Merchant, Richard Herring, Ben Stiller, Larry David, Steve Coogan, Bob Saget, Nathan Fielder; TV shows: The Office, Curb Your Enthusiasm, Peep Show, People Just Do Nothing, The Larry Sanders Show, Ally McBeal
Deadpan comedy	Not strictly a style of comedy, it is telling jokes without a change in facial expression or change of emotion	Pat Paulsen, Dennis Allen, Milton Jones, Jack Dee, Bob Newhart, Jimmy Carr, Steven Wright, Peter Cook, Stephen Colbert, Craig Ferguson, Dylan Moran, Tig Notaro, Karl Pilkington, Nate Bargatze, Richard Ayoade, W. Kamau Bell, Buster Keaton, Geoffrey Chaucer, Bill Murray, Marc Evan Jackson, Andre Braugher, Jim Gaffigan, Les Dawson, Paul Merton, Mike Birbiglia, Mitch Hedberg, Bruce McCulloch, Nick Offerman, Demetri Martin, Todd Barry, Elliott Goblet, Aubrey Plaza, Zach Galifianakis, Michael Longfellow, Michael Redmond, Judah Friedlander, James Acaster, Richard Belzer
Heritage comedy	The comedian discusses humorous traits or stereotypes about their own culture or heritage	Pat Cooper, Bill Engvall, Jeff Foxworthy, Alex Edelman, Johnny Hardwick, Gabriel Iglesias, Eddie Murphy, Marcello Hernández, Trevor Noah, George Lopez, Jackie Mason, Russell Peters, Richard Pryor, Yakov Smirnoff, Henning Wehn, Nigel Ng, Jarlath Regan
Improvisational comedy	Largely unplanned routines, featured on television shows such as: Curb Your Enthusiasm, Whose Line Is It Anyway?, Thank God You're Here	Robin Williams, Jonathan Winters, Joan Rivers, Eddie Izzard, Bob Nelson, Paula Poundstone, Paul Merton, Abish Mathew, Tony Slattery, Josie Lawrence, Jim Sweeney, Steve Steen, Lily Tomlin, Wayne Brady, Ryan Stiles, Colin Mochrie, Drew Carey, Greg Proops, John Sessions, Neil Mullarkey, Kathy Greenwood, Brad Sherwood, Charles Esten, Jeff B. Davis, Tina Fey, Amy Poehler, Stephen Colbert, Jonathan Mangum, Mark Meer, Larry David, Peter Kay, Johnny Vegas, Dave Lawrence, Paul Spence, John Valby, Kaneez Surka
Inside humor	Requires special knowledge in order to be appreciated by the audience	On their first two albums, the Firesign Theatre quoted lyrics and parodied character names from songs found on Beatles albums, which did not appear on the popular Top 40 list. They also created their own inside jokes on later albums by referring to events which occur on their earlier albums.
Insult comedy	Offensive insults directed at the audience or other performers, usually in response to audience hecklers. Don Rickles famously built most of his career on the grouchy persona he developed in his insult comedy days.	Andrew Dice Clay, Ricky Gervais, Bob Saget, Frankie Boyle, Jimmy Carr, Jerry Sadowitz, Sam Kinison, Santhanam, Al Murray, Don Rickles, Triumph the Insult Comic Dog, Joan Rivers, Bianca Del Rio, Roy 'Chubby' Brown, Trey Parker/Matt Stone, Marcus Valerius Martialis, George Carlin, Norm Macdonald, Jonathan Ross, Jeffrey Ross, Dave Attell, Lisa Lampanelli, D.L. Hughley, Greg Giraldo, Goundamani, Kathy Griffin, John Valby, Gilbert Gottfried, Harry Hill, Daniel Tosh,
Mockumentary	Parody using the conventions of documentary style	Films and TV shows: Fubar & Fubar 2, Borat, This Country, This Is Spinal Tap, The Monkees, The Rutles, Summer Heights High, Electric Apricot: Quest for Festeroo, The Office, Brüno, Parks and Recreation, Modern Family, Come Fly with Me, Angry Boys, The Compleat Al, Trailer Park Boys, What We Do in the Shadows
Musical comedy	Derived from music with or sometimes without lyrics	Pink Guy, Rucka Rucka Ali, Bill Bailey, Denis Leary, Tim Minchin, Ninja Sex Party, The Lonely Island, Fred Armisen, Flight Of The Conchords, Les Luthiers, Mitch Benn, Tenacious D, Spinal Tap, Stephen Lynch, Eminem, "Weird Al" Yankovic, Bob Rivers, Bo Burnham, Wayne Brady, the Bonzo Dog Doo-Dah Band, Tiny Meat Gang, Tom Lehrer, Steve Martin, Victor Borge, The Axis of Awesome, John Valby, Jasper Carrott, Boothby Graffoe, David O'Doherty, Rachel Bloom, Adam Sandler, Allan Sherman, Mike Myers, Eddie Murphy, Carlos Alazraqui, Chris Rock, Kevin Hart, Robin Williams, Peter Schickele, Victoria Wood, Jon Lajoie, Dan Bull, Da Vinci's Notebook, Danny Gonzalez, Flo and Joan, Spike Jones and His City Slickers, Schmigadoon!
Observational comedy	Pokes fun at everyday life, often by inflating the importance of trivial things or by observing the silliness of social conventions	George Carlin, Richard Pryor, Cheech & Chong, Jerry Seinfeld, Louis C.K., Bobby Lee, Amy Schumer, Craig Ferguson, Larry David, Ken Jeong, Mitch Hedberg, Billy Connolly, Michael McIntyre, Russell Howard, Colin Jost, Cedric the Entertainer, Steve Harvey, Micky Flanagan, Brad Williams, Gabriel Iglesias, Gianmarco Soresi, W. Kamau Bell, Matt Groening, Ray Romano, Chris Rush, Dane Cook, Seann Walsh, Pete Davidson, Chris Rock, Jim Gaffigan, Kathy Greenwood, Ellen DeGeneres, Russell Peters, John Mulaney, Peter Kay, Victoria Wood, Jack Whitehall, Kanan Gill, Richard Belzer, Mark Normand, Anubhav Singh Bassi
One-line joke	A joke delivered in a single line. A good one-liner is said to be pithy (concise and meaningful).	Tim Allen, Tommy Cooper, Rodney Dangerfield, Ken Dodd, Stewart Francis, Milton Jones, Tim Vine, Lee Mack, Henny Youngman, Mitch Hedberg, Sean Hegarty, Mick Miller, Jimmy Carr, Steven Wright, Demetri Martin, Anthony Jeselnik, Doug Benson, Jim Gaffigan, Zach Galifianakis, Shappi Khorsandi, Dan Mintz, Groucho Marx, Jay London, Mark Normand, Mark Simmons, Ahren Belisle
Physical comedy	Similar to slapstick, this form uses physical movement and gestures; often influenced by clowning	Tim Allen, Johnny Knoxville, Michael Richards, Charlie Chaplin, Buster Keaton, Jacques Tati, Jim Carrey, Bob Nelson, Norman Wisdom, Jerry Lewis, Robin Williams, Chevy Chase, John Ritter, Conan O'Brien, Kunal Nayyar, Jason Lee, Mr. Bean, Michael Mcintyre, Lee Evans, Bill Irwin, David Shiner, Dick Van Dyke, Max Wall, John Belushi, Brent Butt, Kathy Greenwood, The Three Stooges, Lano & Woodley, Lucille Ball, Chris Farley, Sebastian Maniscalco, The Dangerous Brothers, Danny Kaye, Andy Lauer, Luke Rollason, Jordan Brookes, Jimeoin,
Practical jokes or pranking/trolling	Humor based around tricks being played on a person or group of people, generally causing the victim(s) to experience embarrassment, perplexity, confusion, discomfort, or irritation.	Movies: The 2003 Comedy Central tv movie, Windy City Heat, involves comedian and actor, Perry Caravello, believing that he's going to become a big star in a Hollywood movie, but in reality, he's actually being goofed on by a large group of people as part of a huge joke. Also generally the style of humor used in Caravello's spin off livestream show, Perry Caravello Live, by his audience, who send crude donations and unwelcome delivery services to his apartment as ways to make him increasingly mad. Acts: VanossGaming, SeaNanners, The Jerky Boys, Chop & Steele TV Shows: The Eric Andre Show, The Jamie Kennedy Experiment, Trigger Happy TV
Prop comedy	Relies on ridiculous props, casual jackets or everyday objects used in humorous ways	Babatunde Omidina, Bob Nelson, Carrot Top, Gallagher, Timmy Mallett, The Amazing Johnathan, Jerry Sadowitz, Red Skelton, Tape Face, Howie Mandel, Tommy Cooper, Harpo Marx, Bruce Baum, Sam Simmons, Spencer Jones
Screwball comedy	Screwball comedies are a genre of comedy that emerged in the 1930s and became popular in the 1930s and 1940s. They are characterized by their fast-paced, witty dialogue, farcical situations, and romantic storylines that often involve a battle of the sexes.	Jean Arthur, Irene Dunne, Cary Grant, Edward Everett Horton, Carole Lombard, Fred MacMurray, William Powell, Rosalind Russell, Ralph Bellamy
Shock humor	A style of comedy that uses shock value to invoke a strong negative emotion	Andrew Dice Clay, Howard Stern, Impractical Jokers, South Park, Jackass, Eric Andre, Andy Dick, Tom Green,
Sitcom	Television series with scripted dialogue set in a thematic situation	Seinfeld, Cheers, Drake & Josh, Fawlty Towers, Curb Your Enthusiasm, Ted Lasso, Black Books, Porridge, Dad's Army, Blackadder, Gavin & Stacey, The Royle Family, Brooklyn Nine-Nine, My Wife and Kids, Friends, NewsRadio, The Bear, Taxi, Here We Go, The Office, Not Going Out, The Simpsons, Open All Hours, Only Fools and Horses, Benidorm, Dinner Ladies, Modern Family, Schmigadoon!, Reservation Dogs, Two and a Half Men, Miranda, All in the Family, The Fresh Prince of Bel-Air, Family Guy, Parks and Recreation, South Park, The Good Place, How I Met Your Mother, King of the Hill
Sketch	A short scene on television or standup, similar to the sitcom, practised and typically performed live. Sketches sometimes spawn sitcom series, e.g. The Honeymooners, Mama's Family	Armstrong and Miller, Cheech & Chong, Jennifer Saunders, Lorne Michaels, Dawn French, Craig Ferguson, Loveliveserve, Ryan Higa, Jack Douglass, Catherine Tate; TV shows: Monty Python, Armstrong and Miller, The Carol Burnett Show, The Jackie Gleason Show, Saturday Night Live, Studio C, Chappelle's Show, Firesign Theatre, In Living Color, A Bit of Fry & Laurie, Mad TV, Mr. Show, Tim and Eric Awesome Show, Great Job!, Wonder Showzen, Key & Peele, Lenny Henry, Little Britain, The Kapil Sharma Show, Million Dollar Extreme Presents: World Peace, The Whitest Kids U' Know
Spoof/Parody	Humorous Recreation of a book, film or play, either to pay homage or to ridicule the original	Mel Brooks, Joe Alaskey, French and Saunders, Mitchell and Webb, I'm Sorry I Haven't a Clue, Dom Joly, Peter Serafinowicz, Matt Groening, Weird Al Yankovic, C.S Amudhan, Zucker, Abrahams and Zucker; Films and TV shows: Airplane!, Shriek, Look Around You, Onion News Network
Surreal comedy	Based on bizarre juxtapositions, absurd situations, and nonsense logic	Filthy Frank, Spike Milligan, Jay Kogen, Eddie Izzard, J. Stewart Burns, Ross Noble, Bill Bailey, Brent Butt, The Mighty Boosh, Steven Wright, Eric Andre, Russell Brand, Monty Python, Seth MacFarlane, David X. Cohen, Vic and Bob, The Goodies, Jack Handey, Derek Drymon, Wallace Wolodarsky, Harry Hill, The Kids in the Hall, Conan O'Brien, Tim and Eric, Paul Merton, Mitch Hedberg, Firesign Theatre, Shaun Micallef, Emo Philips, Hans Teeuwen, Tony Law, Chic Murray, VanossGaming, Brandon Rogers, Charlie Chuck, Trevor Lock, Sam Hyde/Million Dollar Extreme, The Good Place, Family Guy
Topical comedy/Satire	Relies on news headlines and current affairs; dates quickly, but is a popular form for late night talk-variety shows	Aristophanes, George Carlin, Cheech & Chong, Bill Hicks, Dick Gregory, Chris Morris, Dennis Miller, Norm Macdonald, Conan O'Brien, Russell Howard, Craig Ferguson, David Letterman, Jay Leno, Tom Lehrer, Dan Harmon, Andy Hamilton, Dave Allen, Bill Maher, Jon Stewart, Trevor Noah, Mark Twain, John Oliver, Ian Hislop, Brent Butt, Jimmy Kimmel, Gianmarco Soresi, Paul Merton, Mort Sahl, Kathy Griffin, Stephen Colbert, Stewart Lee, Mark Thomas, Matt Groening, Rory Bremner, Howard Stern, Jack Kimble, Vermin Supreme, W. Kamau Bell, Ben Elton, David Cross, Lewis Black, Chris Rock, Dave Chappelle, The Chaser, Punt and Dennis, Jon Holmes, Tanmay Bhat, Richard Belzer, Hari Kondabolu, Tim Dillon; TV and Radio shows: The Daily Show, The Onion, The Babylon Bee, Have I Got News For You, Mock The Week, The News Quiz, Saturday Night Live / Weekend Update, The Simpsons, The Tonight Show, Late Show with David Letterman, Wait Wait... Don't Tell Me!,
Ventriloquism	Involves character comedy; the comedian uses the skill of ventriloquy to "throw his or her voice" into a dummy or puppet character. The ventriloquist generally speaks as the "straight man" and gives the comic lines to the dummy. Exceptionally skilled ventriloquists can make the dummy sing. Ventriloquists used to appeal exclusively to general audiences and children until the late 1970s, when some ventriloquists started using blue comedy.	Fred Russell, Arthur Prince, Keith Harris, The Great Lester, Edgar Bergen, Paul Winchell, Jimmy Nelson, Shari Lewis, Señor Wences, Willie Tyler, Nina Conti, Darci Lynne, Jeff Dunham
Wit/Word play	More intellectual forms based on clever, often subtle manipulation of language (though puns can be crude and farcical)	Groucho Marx, William Shakespeare, Harry Hill, Jay Jason, Oscar Wilde, Woody Allen, George Carlin, Tim Vine, Stephen Fry, Demetri Martin, Bo Burnham, Firesign Theatre, Myq Kaplan, Crazy Mohan, Bugs Bunny, Ronnie Barker, Stanley Unwin
