= Doris D =

British singer and dancer (born 1959)

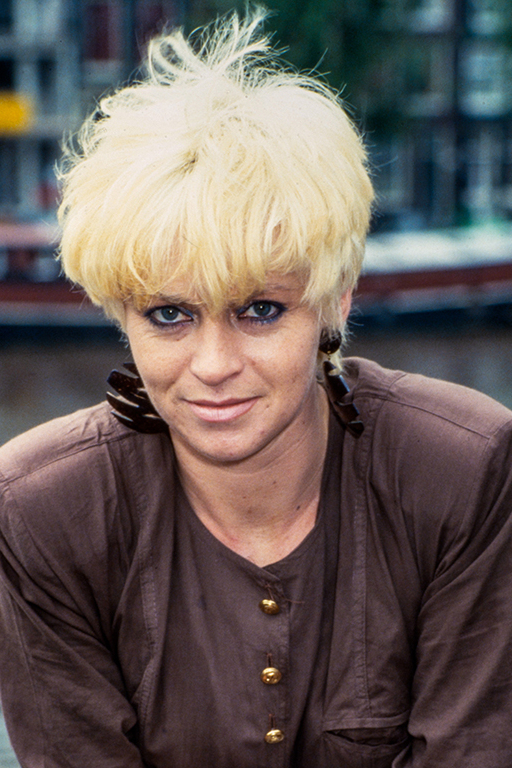
- Debbie Jenner in 1987
- Born: Debbie Jenner; 22 February 1959 (age 67); Skegness, England
- Occupations: Singer; dancer
- Years active: 1980–1986, 1998 (singer)
- Musical career
- Genres: Pop, disco
- Website: debbie-jenner.com

Doris D (born Debbie Jenner; 22 February 1959) is a British singer and dancer who spent her career in the Netherlands.

== Biography ==
Jenner was born in Skegness, England, and settled in the Netherlands at the age of 20 to start a ballet school there. There, she was a featured dancer in the Dutch pop music television program TopPop, and she worked with the girl group Babe. In 1980, she was asked to become the face of the studio band Lipps Inc. in the Netherlands, which had a big hit with "Funkytown".

In spring 1980, the record also reached the number 1 position in the Netherlands on the then-three hit lists on the Dutch public radio station Hilversum 3: the Dutch Top 40, the National Hitparade and the TROS Top 50. Jenner's striking appearance also caught the eye of Piet Souer, producer of fellow girl group Luv', and he asked her to become the lead singer in a new girl group he formed called Doris D & The Pins. The first song Jenner sang for the group was "Shine Up", which was already finished by the time she joined the project. The background vocals on the song were provided by singer Trudy van den Berg, known as Saskia of Saskia & Serge. The stage name Doris D was an allusion to Doris Day. In February 1981, the single reached the number 1 position of both the Dutch Top 40 and the TROS Top 50. In the National Hitparade it reached the second position. After the follow-up "Dance On" reached number 2 in the Dutch Top 40, the group's success started to slowly decline in 1981 with "The Marvelous Marionettes" only reaching number 8. followed by an album in which, in addition to Jenner, featured Van den Berg, Jody Pijper and Luv' singer José Hoebee.

After breaking up with The Pins in 1982, who continued independently under the name Risqué, Jenner put together a new The Pins with dancers from England.

In 1983, Jenner, under the name Doris D, released an aerobics instruction LP Aerobic Dancing with Doris D. that became very popular. After a comeback with another new line-up of The Pins in 1984 yielded only a modest hit, she gave up her singing career to focus entirely on choreography, including for the Dolly Dots, and aerobics instructional videos. In 1986, she choreographed the movie Mama is boos! ("Momma is angry!") and the TV series Reagan: Let's Finish the Job by Edwin de Vries. In addition, she was featured as an actress under her own name in the comedy television film Daar gaat de bruid ("There goes the bride"), alongside Allard van der Scheer, Ina van Faassen, Pieter Lutz and Lex Goudsmit.

In the early 1990s, two compilation CDs by Doris D & The Pins were released, both of which contained the same tracks. In 1998, Jenner performed with the original Pins at a one-time reunion concert in honor of the 1998 Gay Games, which was held in Amsterdam.

Since 2000, she has been involved almost exclusively in teaching Pilates courses and workshops. She opened her first studio in Amsterdam and received several well-known artists and top athletes as clients. In 2002, Jenner received a Lifetime Achievement Award from the EFAA for her efforts as a pioneer in the fitness world over the preceding two decades. In 2013, she returned to England to live in the countryside, but she still comes to the Netherlands for training and teaching instructors and physiotherapists. Since April 2020, she has also been teaching online classes to consumers and instructors through "Deb's Online Health Club".

== Discography ==
=== With Doris D & The Pins ===
==== Albums ====
- Doris D & The Pins (1981)
- Aerobic Dancing with Doris D (1983)
- Starting at the End (1984)
- Shine Up & Other Great Hits (1991)
- The Very Best Of (1992)

==== Singles ====
- "Shine Up" (1980) (Weeks: 21, Peak: 15)
- "Dance On" (1981) (Weeks: 11, Peak: 39)
- "The Marvellous Marionettes" (1981)
- "Jamaica" (1982)
- "Who Cares" (1982)
- "Girlfriend" (1983)
- "Everybody's Doing Their Thing (Hula Hoop)" (1983)
- "Starting at the End" (1984)
- "Heartache" (1984)
- "Men Like Big Girls" (1984)

== Filmography ==
- Daar gaat de bruid (1986) – Polly
