= Risky =

Risky may refer to:

- Risky (album), by B'z, or the title song, 1990
- "Risky", a song by Davido from A Good Time, 2019
- "Risky", a song by Lil Durk from 7220, 2022
- "Risky", a song by Saweetie from Pretty Summer Playlist: Season 1, 2021
- "Risky", a song by Ryuichi Sakamoto from Neo Geo, 1987
- Risky Creek, Alaska, United States

== See also ==
- Risky Business (disambiguation)
- Risqué (disambiguation)
