= Dead Realm =

2015 horror video game

- Developer: Section Studios
- Publisher: 3BLACKDOT
- Platforms: Microsoft Windows, OS X
- Release: Microsoft Windows: WW: August 3, 2015; OS X: WW: August 5, 2015
- Genres: Action, Adventure, Indie, Strategy
- Mode: Multiplayer

Dead Realm was a horror-style game for the PC. The main gameplay consists of one player taking control of a ghost while the remaining players are humans who must avoid being haunted by the ghost. On August 27, 2020, 3BLACKDOT ended support and shut down the official servers following an announcement made on August 19, 2020.The shutdown was mainly due to lack of updates, software bugs, and frequent dedicated server downtime, which caused the player base to decline over time. After the game’s closure, a fan community called Dead Realm Revolt was formed to reverse-engineer the server code and make the game playable again through peer-to-peer connections.

== Gameplay ==
Dead Realm starts off with several players, the maximum being 8 players in a game. The game consist of multiple game modes, Seek & Reap, Bounty/Escape, Reap and Bounty, Hide and Seek, Arcade Seek and Reap, Hardcore Bounty, Redemption, and The Hunted. Although multiple game modes were removed in the latest version (2.206). Seek & Reap is the basic game mode of the game. The game mode pits two teams, Humans, and Ghosts. The Humans must run or hide from the Ghost, and the Ghost attempts to find the Humans, turning them into Ghosts, who then jump scare the remaining players. Regarding bugs or exploits, few players have managed to no-clip in map objects in older versions.

== Development ==
The game's creative directors include TheSyndicateProject, and SeaNanners, with the help of VanossGaming.

Dead Realm was made available through the Steam Early Access platform, and was fully released on May 23, 2017.

== Reception ==
An early version of the game was previewed by Rock Paper Shotgun.

The game initially received positive reviews on Steam, most likely due to VanossGaming's videos of him playing the game to promote it. By 2018 the reviews became extremely negative, with customers complaining about a high amount of software bugs, a lack of developer support, and the lack of a large playerbase making it impossible to play casually, requiring the player to have multiple friends that own the game to be able to play it.

== Controversy ==
After the three YouTubers involved in production of Dead Realm (Adam Montoya, Tom Cassell, and Evan Fong) published their Let's Play videos about the game, they encountered controversy due to the fact that they did not clearly disclose their financial ties to the game, which constituted a violation of the FTC's ".com Disclosures" set of guidelines.
