= Syndicate (gamer) =

English YouTuber and Twitch streamer (born 1993)

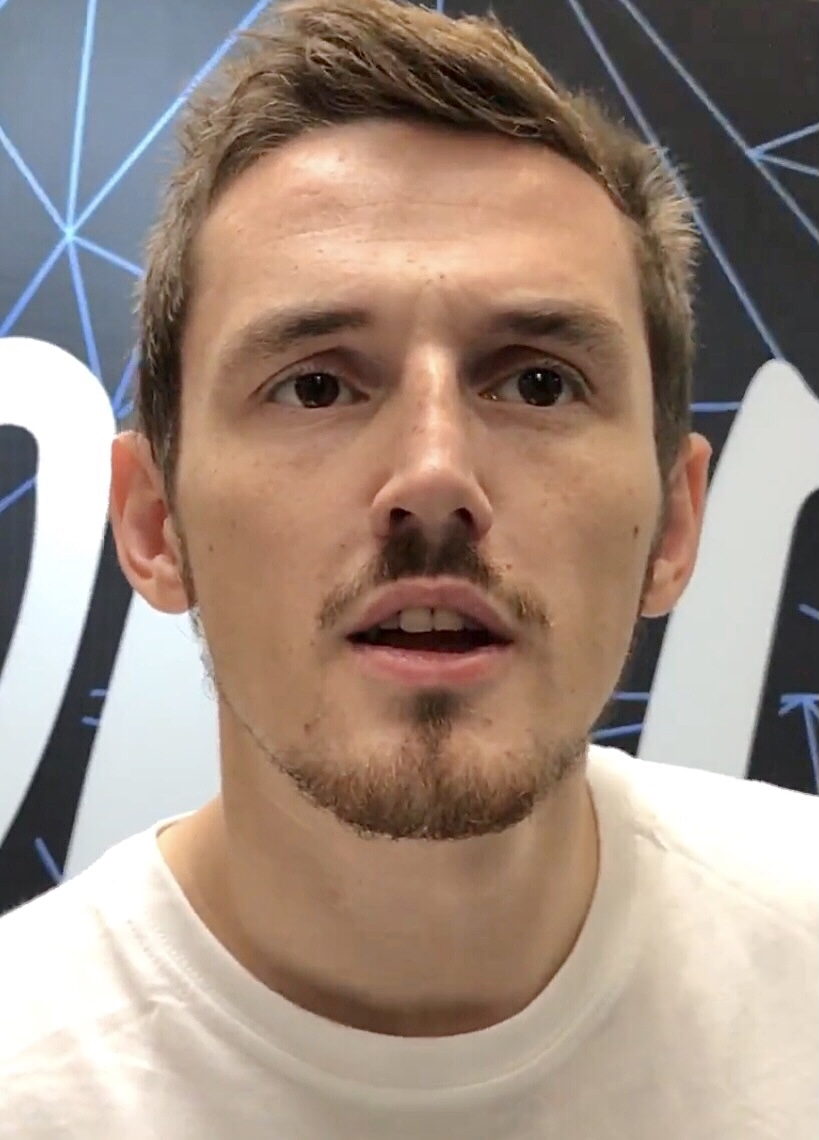
- Cassell in 2018
- Born: Thomas George Cassell; 23 June 1993 (age 33); Manchester, England
- Other name: Tom Cassell
- Occupations: YouTuber; Twitch streamer
- Years active: 2010–present
- Partner: Lydia Hewitt-Lee (2016–present)
- Children: 2

Twitch information
- Channel: Syndicate
- Genre: Gaming
- Followers: 3.1 million (Syndicate); 21.3 thousand (LifeOfTomLive)

YouTube information
- Channel: Syndicate
- Years active: 2010 - present
- Genres: Gaming; vlogging
- Subscribers: 9.53 million (Syndicate); 2.63 million (Life of Tom)
- Views: 2.1 billion (Syndicate); 750 million (Life of Tom)
- Last updated: 1 June 2026
- Website: syndicateoriginal.com

Thomas George Cassell (born 23 June 1993), known online as Syndicate or Life of Tom, is an English YouTuber and Twitch streamer. Regarded as one of the earlier known gaming personalities, his videography consists of Let's Play videos on Call of Duty and Minecraft. Born in Manchester, Cassell had passion for a career in the gaming industry, which he started by purchasing gaming equipment using his money from McDonald's. On 3 September 2010, Cassell registered his gaming channel "TheSyndicateProject", where he found success and an online community. His prominence online was recognized by Call of Duty publisher Activision and multi-channel network (MCN) Machinima, where he signed to the network to monetize his content. Cassell's channel achieved substantial growth, passing one million subscribers in June 2012 and one billion views in late 2013. He further expanded his career into livestreaming on Twitch, hosting the same commentary over his gameplays. His Twitch channel became the first to reach one million followers in August 2014.

Cassell's YouTube content began to shift into vlogging, where his prominence in the genre took place from his life between Los Angeles and the UK. Back in England, Cassell and his father designed his own home, purchasing a nearby property and renovating it into an extensive gaming area. Cassell has co-founded a range of businesses, one of which failed to comply with Federal Trade Commission (FTC) advertising guidelines. He co-founded the entertainment company 3BlackDot along with Evan Fong and Adam Montoya, and became featured in other media, spanning from a mobile game to a 12-track compilation album.

Cassell was nominated for "YouTube Gamer" in 2012 at the Golden Joystick Awards and was nominated as best in "Gaming" at the 9th Shorty Awards. He was also nominated as "Best British Vlogger" in 2014 at the BBC Radio 1's Teen Awards, and in 2017, was recognized by Forbes As one of the top gaming influencers. As of 29 May 2023, his gaming YouTube channel has over nine million subscribers and 2.1 billion views, and his Twitch channel has over three million followers.

== Early life and education ==
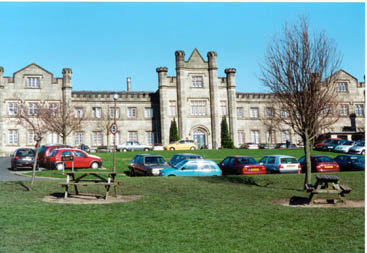
Cassell attended the Blue Coat school at Oldham.

Thomas George Cassell was born on 23 June 1993 in Manchester, England, and is the brother of Alice Cassell. His father worked in construction as a project manager and his mother, Karen Cassell, worked as a children's day care worker. Cassell was educated at the Blue Coat school in nearby Oldham, and sold drinks at school to purchase a 42-inch plasma TV at the age of 15, as his father wanted him to work and pay for the items he wanted to get during the time. He attended Hyde Clarendon Sixth Form College in Ashton-under-Lyne and studied software development and video game design in 2010. After leaving college, he briefly worked at McDonald's to purchase gaming equipment to record YouTube videos.

== Internet career ==
=== 2008–2012: Online beginnings and corporate recognition ===
Before the start of his YouTube career, Cassell uploaded commentary videos on various channels for three years. He started filming his gaming commentaries with his father's camera, and fashioned it with video game cases to point it at the TV. He then acquired a capture card in 2008 to record his gameplay, in which he was inspired by video compilations of no-scope sniper kills on Call of Duty from a friend. In regards to limited advances in technology, Cassell elaborated that video capturing content for YouTube was expensive. He admired the use of both commentary and gameplay in videos, as he was inspired by YouTuber Shaun Hutchinson.

Cassell registered his gaming YouTube channel under the name "TheSyndicateProject" (renamed as "Syndicate") on 3 September 2010. On YouTube, he uploaded Let's Play videos on the video game franchises Halo, Grand Theft Auto, and Call of Duty. He came to prominence with his videos on Call of Duty: Modern Warfare 2 (2009) and the Call of Duty: Black Ops (2010) Zombies mode. Cassell had amassed around 300,000 views on his Call of Duty gameplays when he received a contract offer from multi-channel network (MCN) Machinima. He described this offer as the start of his full-time career as a gaming YouTuber. After passing 500,000 subscribers, his content featured Minecraft gameplay for the first time. His Minecraft Let's Play series included The Minecraft Project, Trinity Island, and Mianite, where Cassell forms a storyline through the game with fellow streamers on Twitch, such as Jordan Maron and Sonja Reid.

In October 2012, Eurogamer reported that Cassell had attracted the attention Call of Duty publisher Activision during a 2011 GameCity convention. At the convention, Cassell drew video game journalists' attention to the YouTube gaming community and said that endorsement from a prominent company "is the best thing ever". His channel reached one million subscribers and over 370 million views in June 2012. Kevin Dowling of The Sunday Times recognized him as the UK's most popular gamer and estimated that he earned £700,000 a year, or £60,000 a month. Dowling said that the engagement Cassell attracted was "because he led [an exciting life] beyond his gaming videos".

=== 2013–present: Vlogging ventures and advertising violations ===
Cassell co-founded the entertainment company 3BlackDot with YouTubers Evan Fong and Adam Montoya in 2013, along with former Machinima executives Angelo Pullen and Luke Stepleton. Cassell reached one billion views on his gaming channel in late 2013. Rob Waugh of Yahoo! News commented on Cassell's viewership as having "more viewers than hit TV shows such as EastEnders". In January 2014, Cassell's gaming channel reached 6.7 million subscribers. He began to vlog on his "Life of Tom" channel between his residences in Los Angeles and the UK, the start of which he began to receive sponsorships. In July, Cassell's gaming channel reached 7.6 million subscribers and Gamasutra had listed it as the 6th most-subscribed gaming channel on YouTube.

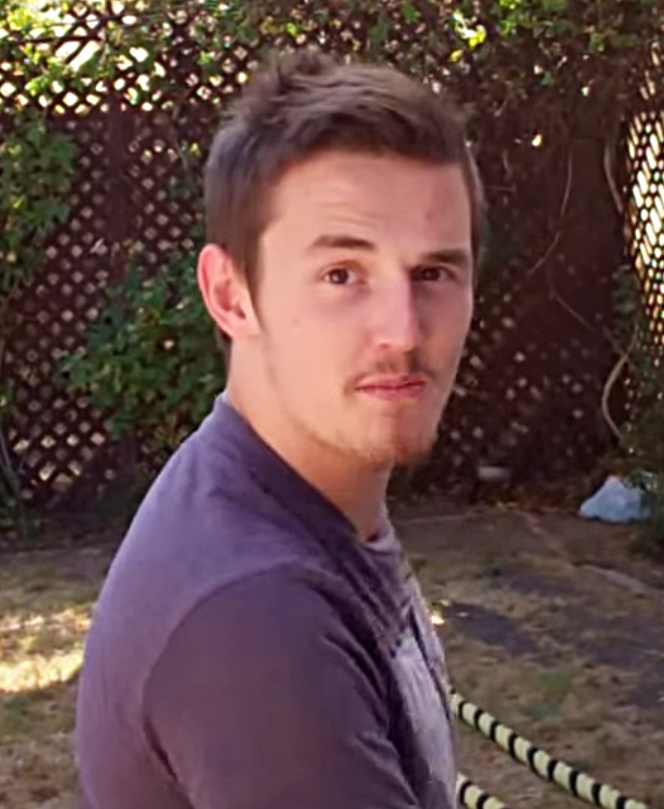
Cassell in a vlog from YouTuber MuzzaFuzza in 2014

Cassell's Twitch channel became the first to reach one million followers on 17 August, before Riot Games passed the milestone. On Twitch, Cassell reached 120,000 concurrent viewers on a Call of Duty livestream on 24 August. In November, Cassell signed to 3BlackDot's MCN Jetpak as the service went live for a better payment model. Gamasutra later reported that Cassell uploaded Let's Play videos of 3BlackDot's game Dead Realm, which failed to comply with FTC guidelines regarding a disclosure of a sponsorship. In November 2015, his gaming channel was nearly at 10 million subscribers. Wired estimated Cassell's earnings to be US$1 million a year.

Cassell attracted media attention in July 2016 when he promoted the skin gambling website CSGO Lotto along with Trevor Martin without disclosing a conflict of interest as vice-president of the company, in conflict with FTC regulations. In his videos promoting the site, Cassell had disclosed the endorsements in their descriptions and responded that he would be more transparent about these disclosures in the future. The FTC later reached a settlement agreement with Martin and Cassell in September 2017 for disclosing their legal relations and sponsorship deals with companies. There were no financial charges held against Cassell.

In 2016, Cassell's gaming and vlogging channel reached 10 and 2 million subscribers respectively, and in August 2018, his Twitch channel accumulated 2.6 million followers. Throughout his vlogging career, Cassell had travelled to Abu Dhabi and the Acropolis of Athens, and received further recognition for his livestreams, as Insider ranked Cassell as the 7th most popular Twitch streamer worldwide. Activision then collaborated with Cassell to showcase and stream the "Gunfight" multiplayer mode in Call of Duty: Modern Warfare (2019) on Twitch.

== Content ==
=== Online content ===
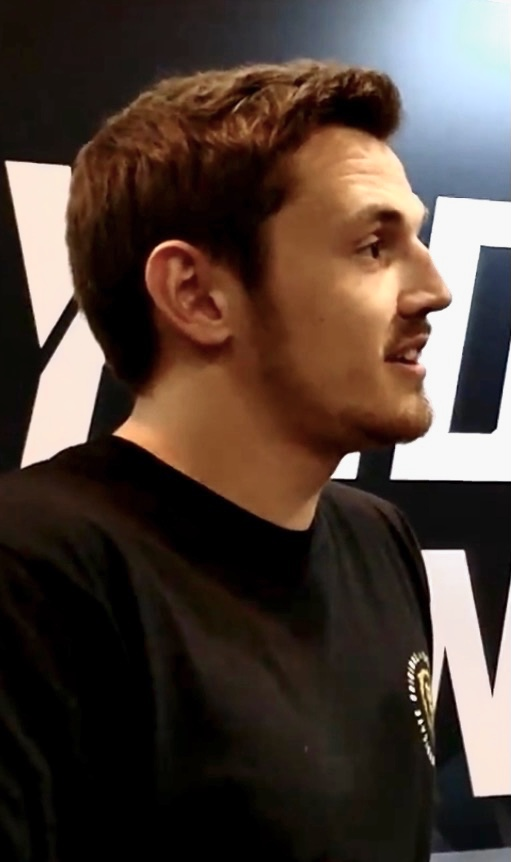
Cassell at the i60 Insomnia Gaming Festival

Cassell maintained his schedule of two gaming videos daily. He described himself as a PC gamer and said that Minecraft had been the most popular game on his channel, having an interest in sandbox-styled video games. He advised others that consistency and quality was necessary for success. Regarding content, he wanted gaming to be "more of an adventure" and liked the rapid use of social interaction in livestreams. After gaming, Cassell's YouTube content shifted to vlogging, as he wanted his audience to know him outside of the genre. Kotaku described him as a daily vlogger. He has frequently played Lisa Mitchell's song "Neopolitan Dreams", as it was one of the first tracks he received a free music license from. He was aware of potential negative aspects of vlogging, such as showcasing "drinking and partying", although wished to remain as authentic as possible online.

=== Audience and reception ===
Cassell set goals for himself for content creation, which included channel viewership and subscriber milestones. In an interview with the BBC, Cassell said that he did not intend to target a specific audience but "would not advise a 10-year-old to watch [his] videos". He described the demographics of his audience as "60% Americans, Canadians and [others] scattered around rest of the world". The initial purpose of Cassell's videos was to sustain an audience to work at a video game company. His goal changed towards engaging people and making them feel involved. Will Porter of Eurogamer described him as a "cool older brother" and "the kid everyone wanted to be friends with at school".

== Other ventures ==
Inspired by a trip to the US in 2011, Cassell co-founded a clothing company operated by his sister and his mother. Cassell was given the role as a judge at the British Academy Games Awards, and was featured in the mobile game Zombie Killer Squad. Released in November 2013, it was the first mobile game developed by 3BlackDot's game development branch. Within nine days of release, the game had accumulated 1 million downloads and saw 2.6 million by July 2014. Stepleton believed that the success of the game was primarily due to fans of Cassell, as they "put zero promotional dollars behind traditional user acquisition". Cassell voiced Loki in the mobile game Marvel Avengers Academy and was featured in the feature-length documentary film Minecraft: Into the Nether.

Cassell was a guest star at the premiere of the Call of Duty: Black Ops III (2015) Zombies map "Shadows of Evil" at San Diego Comic-Con 2015. He raised £75,000 for the Motor Neurone Disease Association in two weeks, and created the gaming fundraiser "GameStars" for the Make-A-Wish Foundation, where he supported critically ill children through gaming events at the Science and Industry Museum. In May 2016, he produced the compilation album Sounds of Syndication through record label Heard Well. The album is composed of 12 tracks of various artists, including electronic trio Klaypex and Lisa Mitchell. He initially contacted the record label at a charity event to produce the album.

== Personal life ==
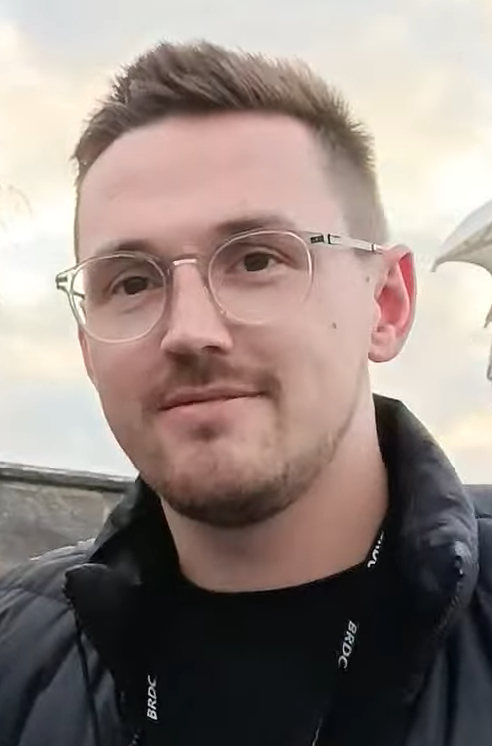
Cassell at the BTCC at the Silverstone in 2023

At the age of 19, Cassell had a "£1 million house" designed and constructed by him and his father. He has said that he prefers to be near his hometown. Inspired by the British television series Grand Designs, he reconstructed the house in order to create a space for gaming. BBC North West Tonight described his residence as a "£1 million house", and Eurogamer reported that fans have traced his place of residence though Cassell's college route and Google Street View.

In 2012, Cassell dated social media influencer Kaitlin Witcher, known online as Piddleass. In June 2020 during the MeToo movement, Cassell was accused of sexual assault by Witcher during their relationship. That same month, Cassell was accused of sexual assault by Twitch streamer Natalie Casanova, known as TheZombiUnicorn, while the two were filming the Legends of Gaming show in 2016. Cassell denied the allegations, stating that all activity was consensual, and described the situation as a "character assassination by social media".

In July 2023, Cassell announced that he and his long-term partner, Lydia Hewitt-Lee, were expecting their first child together. In November 2023, their son was born. In August 2024, Cassell purchased 0.45 km^{2} of land close to his home. In December 2025, Cassell announced that he and Hewitt-Lee were having a second child. In June 2026, their daughter was born.

== Awards and nominations ==
Awards and nominations received by Tom Cassell
Award	Year	Category	Result	Ref.
BBC Radio 1 Teen Awards	2014	Best British Vlogger	Nominated	
Forbes	2017	Top Influencers: Gaming	Won	
Golden Joystick Awards	2012	YouTube Gamer	Nominated	
Guinness World Records	2014	First person to reach one million followers on Twitch	Won	
Guinness World Records	2015	Most goals scored in a game of Rocket League by a team of 2	Won	(Note: Shared with Daniel Middleton)
Guinness World Records	2016	Highest score in offline Team Deathmatch using only the knife and combat axe on Call of Duty: Black Ops III (team of two)	Won	(Note: Shared with Alastair Aiken)
Guinness World Records	2016	Most followed Twitch channel	Won	
Shorty Awards	2017	Gaming	Nominated	

== See also ==
- List of YouTubers
- List of people from Manchester
