= John Valby =

American musician

- Born: John R. Valby; November 22, 1944 (age 81); Buffalo, New York

Comedy career
- Years active: 1970s-present
- Medium: Stand-up
- Genres: Blue comedy, musical comedy, insult comedy, improvisational comedy
- Subjects: Human sexuality, race relations, American politics, religion, everyday life
- Website: Official website

John R. Valby (born November 22, 1944) is an American musician, singer, songwriter, comedian, and producer known for his comedic and obscene song parodies. Also known as Dr. Dirty, he typically performs in a white tailcoat suit and black derby hat. His songs and shows focus mainly on sex and racial slurs, with a mix of current and historic people and events.

== Early life ==
Valby was born and raised in Western New York. He attended school in Rochester, New York, where at age seven, was taught to play the piano by two nuns. At ten, Valby wanted to become a performer. In 1966, Valby graduated from Middlebury College in Middlebury, Vermont. At one point he considered a profession as a philosophy teacher, but soon realized it was not right for him and focused on musical entertainment.

== Career ==
Valby joined various rock bands in his early career that "kept on breaking up", which drove him to become a solo piano act of mostly rock and roll and honky tonk tunes. At one show in May 1974, he added some dirty songs of his own into the set. The positive response to the dirty songs led Valby to focus on the more adult material. He would often write new material while traveling between gigs. Valby claimed that he was named "Dr. Dirty" by the National Entertainment Conference, a booking organisation for the college circuit. He stated that he disliked the name because it "takes away from the element of surprise". He credited some of his obscene act as a reaction to the Catholic repression that he faced during childhood.

In addition to his blue comedy act, Valby has recorded and produced pop and rock albums for himself and other artists, including Buffalo Sabres defenseman Jim Schoenfeld, with whom Valby recorded two albums, Schony (1972) and The Key is Love (1974). He also had a small role as a piano player in a Tijuana brothel in the 1983 film Losin' It which featured an early performance by Tom Cruise.

== Personal life ==
Valby is married to his wife Anne; together they have six children. In August 2012 his home in Clarence, New York was burned due to suspected arson. As of 2016, he still lives in Clarence.

Valby endorsed Donald Trump in the 2016 United States presidential election and recorded a song and music video supporting his campaign. (He would later backtrack on his endorsement, working a line into a 2018 song stating that Trump was "full of shit".)

== Discography ==
John Valby discography
Album	Year	Notes
The Key Is Love	1974	collaboration with Jim Schoenfeld
Philosophical Bull Shit	1974	
Dirt	1975	
Hotel Buffalo	1977	
Concerto for Piano, Voice and 500 Screaming Assholes	1978	
Lily White And Burnout Blue	1980	
Give Me Dirt or Give Me Death	1980	
Sit on a Happy Face	1982	
Jingle Balls	1982	
Dr. Dirty in Pixieland	1982	
What I Did on My Summer Vacation	1986	
A Sawmill River Christmas	1986	
A Midsummer's Wet Dream	1987	
Don't Go Soft on Me Now	1988	
Beaver Fever	1988	
Your Face or Mine	1989	
Compact DIRT: Digital Ditties	1989	
Fruits of an Idle Mind	1990	
Double Valby: Don't Go Soft on Me Now/Your Face or Mine	1990	
Bootleg Valby	1991	
Dirt the Movie	1991	VHS
The Doctor Is In	1992	
Half in the Bag	1992	
Butt Seriously Folks	1992	
Live from Jackinsack New Jersey	1992	
It's a Small Dick After All and Other Short Subjects	1992	live album
Double D CD	1993	
Up for Re-Erection	1994	
Scratch N Sniff	1995	
Super Pixies	1995	
20 Years as Dr. Dirty in America	1995	VHS
Fruits of an Idle Mind	1996	
Butt's Up Doc	1997	
Cherry Poppin' in Grand Rapids	1998	
WWW.VALBY.CUM	1998	
Same Shit Different Cover	1998	
Half in the Fuckin' Bag	1999	
Best of Dr Dirty	2000	
The Not Yet On CD, CD	2000	
Herniated Jingle Balls	2000	
Dr. Dirty's Sphincter Unplugged	2001	
American Troubadour	2001	
Dr. Dirty: O&A and T&A Video	2001	
Greatest Tits	2001	
Operation Fuck Iraq	2003	
Up for Re-Erection	2003	
The Old Fart Cuts Another One	2004	
Valby Rocks	2005	
Treasury of XXXMas Classics	2006	
Coming Soon on a Face Near You	2007	
I'm Here for the Gangbang	2007	
Sheep Thrills	2008	
The Dirt Poems	2009	
Tequila Mockingbird	2009	DVD
Superpixies	2011	
Tickling the Ovaries	2012	
Survival of the Stiffest	2015	
Keep Calm and Valby On	2015	
Democracy Is Working Again	2016	
Juicy Tidbits	2018	
A Fun Night Out	2023	
Live at the Pine Inn	Unknown	
Ivy	Unknown	
