= Doris D & The Pins =

Dutch-British band

- Origin: Netherlands
- Genres: Pop, disco
- Years active: 1980–1985, 1998
- Past members: Debbie Jenner; Ingrid de Goede; Yvonne van Splunteren; Irene Van den Hoeven; Dona Baron

Doris D & The Pins were a Dutch-British disco/pop girl group which enjoyed success in the Netherlands and Belgium and to a lesser extent in Germany during the first half of the 1980s.

== History ==
=== 1980: Formation of the group ===
The central figure of the female group was the British singer and dancer Doris D (born Debbie Jenner on 22 February 1959 in Skegness, United Kingdom) who was briefly in 1980 the face of the American group Lipps Inc. on Dutch and German television by lip-synching the song "Funkytown" (the real performer being Cynthia Johnson).

Songwriters and producers Hans van Hemert and Piet Souer (famous thanks to the commercial success of the pop trio Luv') and Martin Duiser took a liking to Jenner when they saw her dancing on television and offered her to become the lead singer of a female formation. Three Dutch dancers (Ingrid de Goede, Yvonne van Splunteren, Irene Van den Hoeven) and an English dancer (Dona Baron) were recruited to accompany Jenner, with Jenner being renamed Doris D and the dancers baptized The Pins. Thus, the quintet Doris D & The Pins was born.

=== 1981–1985: Golden years, legal issues and break-up ===
Souer and Van Hemert composed the disco-pop song "Shine Up" and had it recorded by Doris D. Background vocals were recorded by the singer Saskia (of the duo Saskia & Serge, popular in the Netherlands) and not by The Pins, who were content to do playback and dance on "Shine Up" during stage or television performances.

At the beginning of 1981, Doris D & The Pins took the single "Shine Up" to number one on the Dutch and Flemish charts and number fifteen on the German hits chart. Soon after, the second single "Dance On" reached the Top 5 in Holland and Flanders and number 39 in the German charts. The next record, the single "The Marvelous Marionettes" was No. 8 in the Netherlands and No. 16 in Flanders. In the process, the group released their first eponymous album (N° 22 in Holland) whose artistic realization was supervised by Souer and Duiser, who called on the Swedish Radio Symphony Orchestra of Stockholm to record the brass and strings at Polar Studios (ABBA's recording studios).

In 1982, following a lawsuit (won by Doris D), The Pins parted ways with Doris D and on January 25 that year announced the formation of another band called Risqué, which achieved success with the single "The Girls Are Back In Town". Doris D hired four new Pins (all of British nationality). "Jamaica" (N° 17 in the Netherlands and N° 12 in Flanders) was the first record of the new version of the girl group.

From 1983, producer Jacques Zwart (husband of Marga Scheide of Luv') took care of the artistic direction of Doris D & The Pins. The single "Starting at the End" reached number 27 in the Dutch Top 40 in early 1984.

In 1985, the band broke up.

=== 1998: Brief comeback ===
The original lineup of Doris D & The Pins performed at the Amsterdam Gay Games on August 7, 1998, at the Amsterdam Arena in Amsterdam.

== Discography ==
=== Albums ===
- Doris D & The Pins (1981)
- Aerobic Dancing with Doris D (1983)
- Starting at the End (1984)
- Shine Up & Other Great Hits (1991)
- The Very Best Of (1992)

=== Singles ===
- "Shine Up" (1981) (Weeks: 21, Peak: 15)
- "Dance On" (1981) (Weeks: 11, Peak: 39)
- "The Marvellous Marionettes" (1981)
- "Jamaica" (1982)
- "Who Cares" (1982)
- "Girlfriend" (1983)
- "Everybody's Doing Their Thing (Hula Hoop)" (1983)
- "Starting at the End" (1984)
- "Heartache" (1984)
- "Men Like Big Girls" (1984)
