= Risqué =

Risqué may refer to:

- Material deemed slightly indecent or liable to shock, especially sexual suggestiveness
- Risqué (album), 1979 recording by American disco band Chic
- Risque (character), mutant character first appearing in Marvel Comics X-Force in 1996
- Risqué (group), all-female Dutch dance music group active 1982–1985

== See also ==
- Risky (disambiguation)
