= Jay Jason =

American comedian (1915–2001)

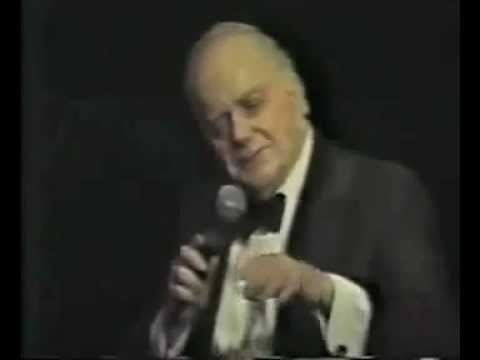
- Jay Jason
- Born: Jonas Levy; Rochester, New York, U.S.
- Notable work: Entertained for over 65 years in top night clubs across the US, and spent most of his career in the Catskills Mountains. Appeared on television shows including The Ed Sullivan show.
- Spouse(s): Lynn Jason (two children Diana Allen and Leonard A Jason)

Comedy career
- Years active: 1933–2000
- Medium: Stand-up; Catskills Mountains; Night clubs
- Genres: Impersonations/Political satire Ventriloquest; Improvisational comedy
- Subjects: American politics International relations race relations Ethnic Jokes; Jewish culture

Jay Jason (1915 – 2001) was an American stand-up comedian who continuously performed in the show-business industry from 1933 to 2000.

== Early life ==
Jay Jason's grandparents were from Eastern Europe and Russia. His parents, Lina and Ben, had six children. Jay Jason's interest in show business began when he would imitate the dialects of some of the residents from different countries who lived in boarding houses his parents owned. Born in Rochester, NY, Jay Jason attended the University of Rochester where he majored in languages. He traveled to Buffalo for amateur shows, and success in these comedy contests led him to pursue a career as an entertainer.

== Early comedy career ==
Barely 19 years of age, he left the University of Rochester after two years for his first major club date, and changed his name from Jonas Levy to Jay Jason (sometimes in the media his last name was spelled Jayson). It was a common practice in those days for Jewish entertainers to change their names, to be more accepted. He performed throughout the Midwest during the 1930s. During World War Two, he entertained for the USO, and during one show, he performed in front of hundreds of Hollywood and night club personalities including Red Skelton and Mickey Rooney.

After the war, he continued to entertain in the Midwest. In a 1950 Columbus, Ohio, newspaper article, reporter Herb Christopher calls Jay Jason "a rising star," and as “the current Palm Garden Headliner… (he) finds many calls for guest appearances, benefit performances. Local television guest shows also come all too easy…” There are many other media reports of Jason performing such as a 1951 article in the Toledo Blade: “JAY JASON. This well known comedian, who has played many engagements in Toledo and has one of the largest night club followings…"

== Later comedy career ==
From the 1950s to the late 1990s, Jason was one of the most enduring and recognized performers at Catskill Mountains' resorts. He played frequently at the Granit, Concord, Kutsher's Hotel, the Nevele, The Laurels Hotel and Country Club, The Pines Resort, Raleigh, the Overlook, the Tamarack Lodge, Stevensville, the Windsor, and Grossinger's Catskill Resort Hotel.

As mentioned by Grosswirth, "Jay's name will be familiar to those of you who used to frequent what was commonly referred to as 'The Borscht Belt'". In a Newsday magazine article in 1992, reporter Stuart Vincent mentioned that Jay “is the consummate Catskills comic... You’ve probably seen him if you’ve been to one of the Borscht Belt hotels in the Catskills with your temple, your church, your parents, your cousins. A funny man. A comic’s comic. An entertainer for 60 years—impressionist, singer, even has a few dance steps in him…he’s played the Las Vegas hotels and Manhattan night clubs, appeared on The Ed Sullivan Show three times.”

Jason's humor had self-deprecating aspects, and all subjects were grist for his comedy routines. He also impersonated celebrities such as Alfred Hitchcock, Jackie Mason, Jack Benny, Maurice Chevalier, Rudolph Valentino, Jimmy Stewart, the Hunchback of Notre-Dame, Arthur Godfrey, and Franklin Roosevelt, and he also did voice-overs for cartoon characters. In addition to being mentioned as one of the comics who regularly performed at the Borscht Belt, Jason was mentioned on internet sites listing famous comedians, and his YouTube videos are featured on a number of internet comedy sites.

Jason’s jokes were often quoted in different newspapers such as the News and Courier in South Carolina, the Toledo Blade in Ohio, the Pittsburgh Post-Gazette in Ohio, and the Miami News in Florida. As an example, Martin Burden of the New York Post wrote: “Feud-in-the-making: Jack E. Leonard at the Blue Angel and Jay Jason at the Latin Quarter are telling the same quip: I always thought Chubby Checker was a fat taxicab.” In addition, Earl Wilson of the Sarasota Herald-Tribune wrote: “Today’s Best Laugh. New York has more psychiatrists than plumbers says Jay Jason, proving the city has more stuffed-up heads than toilets.” In the syndicated Parade Magazine, Jason was quoted as saying: “You’ve all heard of kleptomaniacs. Well I know a guy who suffers from mania-klepto. He walks into department stores backward, sneaks up to the counter when no one is watching and leaves things. People talk about doctors and unethical practices—splitting fees, over-charging, all that stuff. But not my doctor. He’s a great physician, honest, sincere, above-board. He never operatives on you unless he really needs the money.”

During his career, he appeared on The Ed Sullivan Show, Mike Wallace's Nite Beat, the Dorsey Brothers television Stage Show, as well as radio programs such as the American-Jewish Caravan. He also performed at top night clubs across the country such as the Slate Brothers in Hollywood, the Fontainebleau Hotel in Miami Beach, the Flamingo Hotel in Las Vegas and the Latin Quarter (nightclub) in New York City. He also entertained in other countries such as when he performed on television in Australia. He also opened shows for entertainers such as Duke Ellington and Louis Armstrong. Jason was also mentioned in the popular entertainer’s magazine the Billboard. In the late 1980s, he appeared as the comedy star of Sugar Daddy, a vaudeville-type show with music, comedy, illusion and costumes. In Moore's book on comedians, he mentions that Jay Jason was one of the great comics he would watch at the Downingtown Inn, and Jay’s name was mentioned in a number of other books. For example, Rudd is quoted in Jazz and its discontents, saying that "Comedians are like the jazz musicians of the Borscht Belt, ... then there's Ralph Pope, Jay Jason, Lenny Rush, and Mickey Marvin...they’re incredible. And they do improvise, within a set form. They work with a set number of variables—like a musician would with, say, twelve notes—and they shift the order of things according to how the audience is reacting. They usually start out the same and have a big thing they do at the end that brings it to a peak and lets then bow out gracefully. Like a final coda or cadenza. But in the middle, you never know where they’re going next. That’s the exciting part".

== Personal life ==
Jay married Lynn Peltz in 1947, and had two children named Diana and Leonard. After moving throughout the Midwest for much of his early career, in the mid-1950s, Jay and Lynn settled in Teaneck, NJ, which allowed Jason easy access to the Catskills Mountains.

A number of comedians worked for Jason over time as drivers to the Borscht Belt hotels, including the comedian Kenny Kramer, who was used as the basis for the character from the American sitcom Seinfeld. Kramer is quoted as saying: “Through a friend of mine, I ended up getting a job as a chauffeur for a comedian named Jay Jayson, who was very popular in the Catskills. I used to drive Jay to his gigs, and carry his wardrobe, and I started writing jokes for Jay. Jay is doing my jokes and they’re getting great laughs, and I realize, hey, I could do these jokes myself. So on November 7, 1971, I stepped on a stage for the first time as a comedian…” Jason's nephew, Sid Roth, host of a noted messianic radio and television show, also drove Jason to the hotels in the Catskills.

Jason was well liked among entertainers. This is illustrated by a newspaper story about his son's bar mitzvah: "The boy’s father is the current comedy star at the Latin Quarter in New York city. Many show business personalities attended the service, including Jackie Mason, Phil Foster, Norman Dean, Lew Black, Davey Starr, Jack Kahane, Corbett Monica, Gene Baylos, Marilyn Maxwell, Tony Drake, Laura Lane, Tina Robin and Bea Kalmus." At his daughter Diana's wedding, comedians who attended included: Reginald Stanbach, Lou Menchell, Allan Tresser, Dusty Brooks, Al Bernie and Murray Waxman. Jason associated with other leading comics (e.g., Don Rickes, Morty Gunty, etc.) and entertainers of the second half of the 20th century.
