= Marcha =

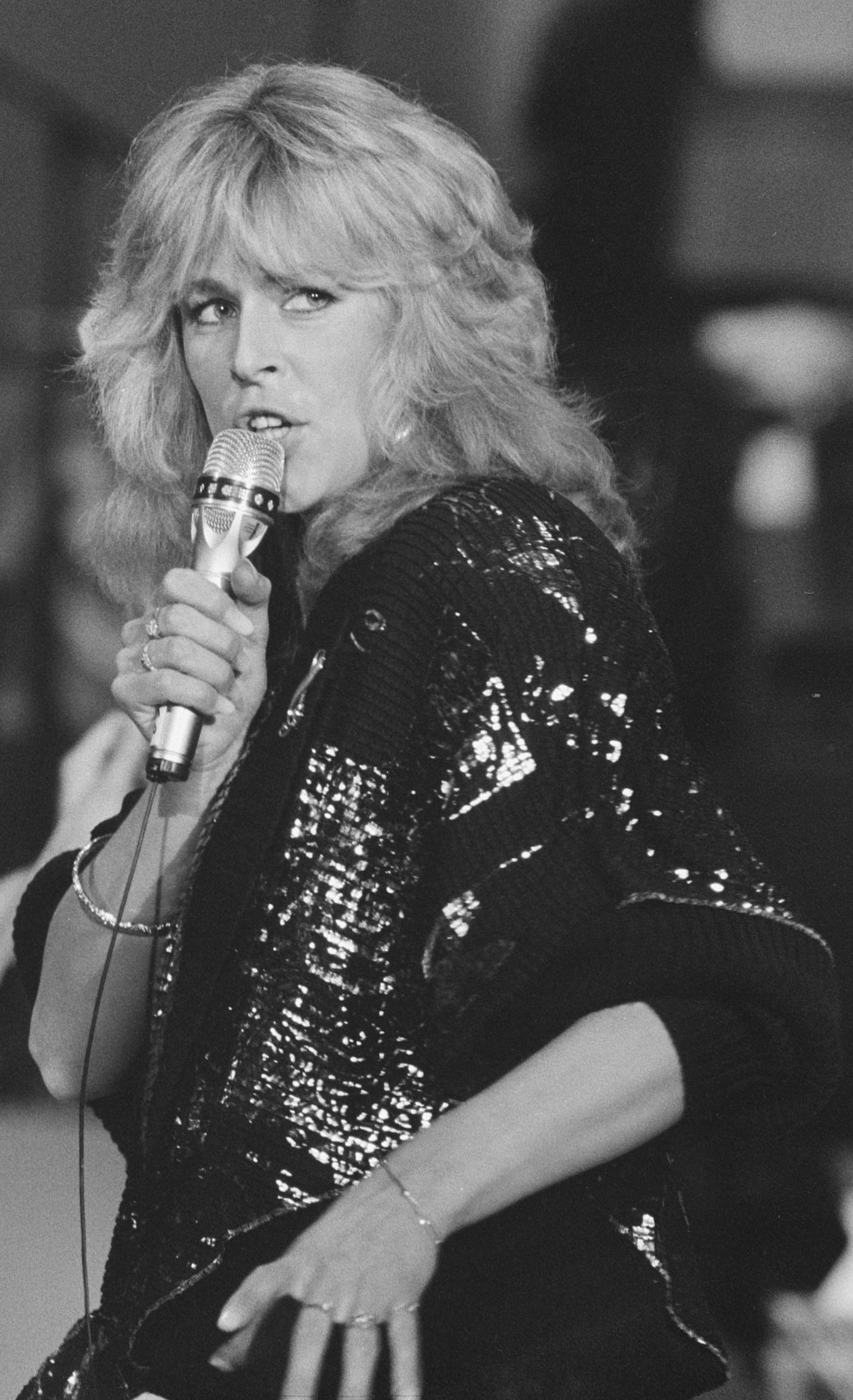
- Marcha (Marga Bult) at the 1987 Nationaal Songfestival

Background information
- Born: Margaretha Hendrika Maria Groeneveld; 2 July 1956 (age 69)
- Origin: Lattrop, Twente, Netherlands
- Genres: Pop
- Occupation: Singer

Marcha (born Margaretha Hendrika Maria Groeneveld on 2 July 1956), also known as Marga Bult, is a Dutch singer and television presenter, who has been a member of the groups Tulip, Babe and Dutch Divas and is also known for her participation in the 1987 Eurovision Song Contest.

== Tulip and Babe ==
In 1979, Marcha joined forces with former Teach-In (band) singer Marianne Wolsink to form the duo Tulip. They had only released two singles however when, in 1981, Marcha was chosen from over 200 candidates as the replacement for the departing lead singer Gemma van Eck in girl group Babe, who had established themselves since 1979 as regular chart performers, with six top 30 singles in the Netherlands. Known as Marga Bult during this time, she recorded two albums and 14 singles with Babe, and toured extensively across Europe and Asia, before the group disbanded in June 1986.

== Eurovision ==
In 1987, as a solo artist, Marcha was chosen by broadcaster NOS to be the Dutch singer for that year's Eurovision Song Contest, and in a selection of six songs, "Rechtop in de wind" ("Upright in the Wind") was chosen by regional juries as the country's entry. At the 1987 Eurovision, held on 9 May in Brussels, "Rechtop in de wind" finished in joint fifth place of 22 entries.

== Later career ==
In the 1990s Marcha moved into television presenting, working on shows for several Dutch channels. In 2000, she joined fellow Dutch Eurovision veterans Maggie MacNeal and Sandra Reemer to form the Dutch Divas, who quickly established themselves as a popular live act, particularly with the Dutch gay community. Reemer left the group in 2005 and was replaced briefly by another Eurovision performer, Justine Pelmelay, who remained with the group for a year; since then Marcha and MacNeal have continued as a duo.
In 2010 she still performs as a solo artist. Besides her performances she is also a regular presenter for the regional broadcasting company RTV Oost. In 1996, Marga announced the scores of the Dutch jury at the Eurovision Song Contest staged in Oslo, Norway. In 2012, she recorded a new version of her Eurovision entry Rechtop in De Wind In 2025, she appeared in an episode of the television show The Masked Singer.

Awards and achievements
Preceded by Frizzle Sizzle with "Alles heeft ritme"	Netherlands in the Eurovision Song Contest; 1987	Succeeded by Gerard Joling with "Shangri-La"
