= Pieter Lutz =

Dutch actor (1927–2009)

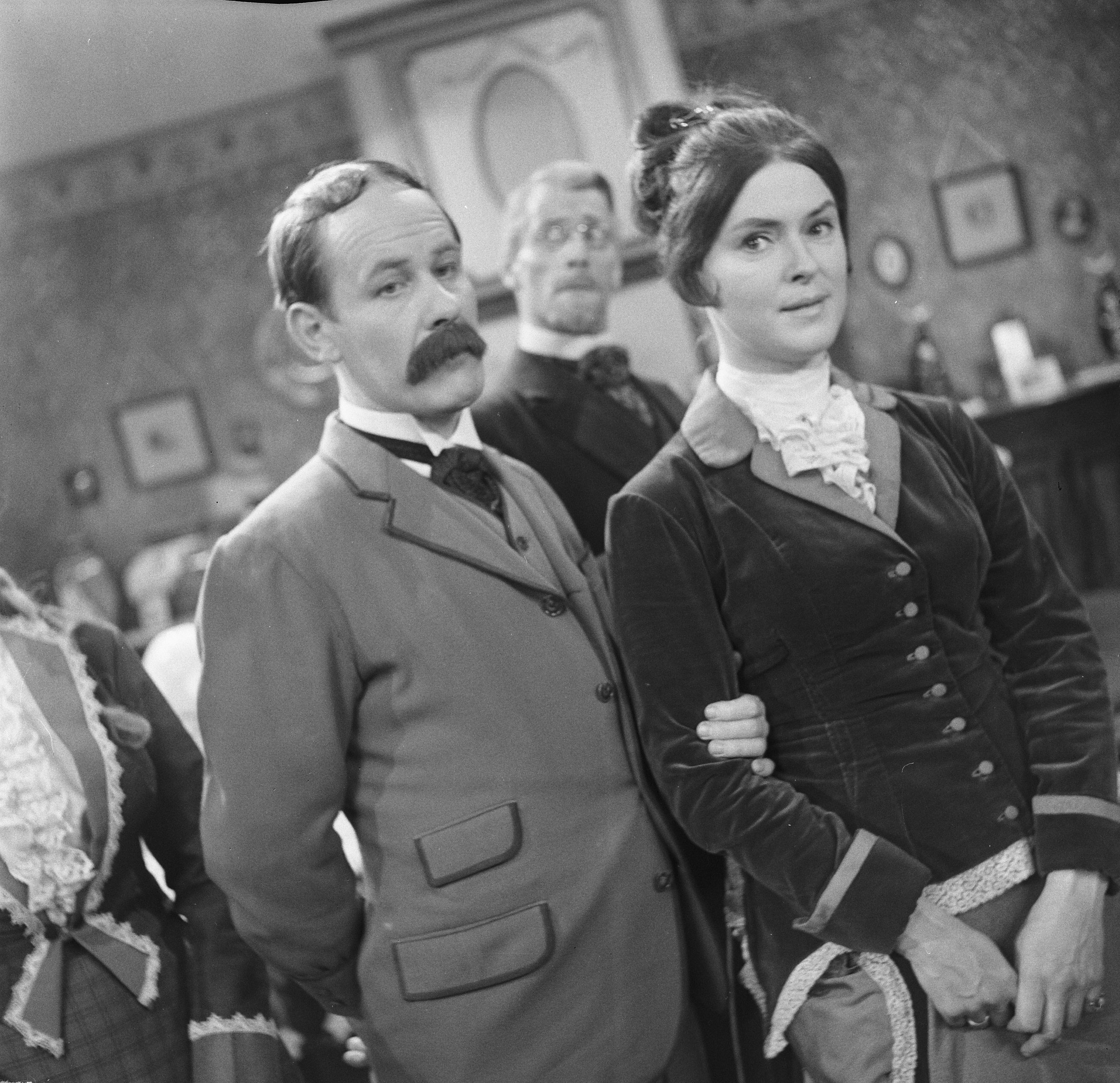
- Lutz (left) in the comedy Hotel het Paradijs with Ina van Faassen in 1963
- Born: Petrus Gerardus Lutz; 13 August 1927; Delft, South Holland, Netherlands
- Died: 20 August 2009 (aged 82); Rotterdam, South Holland, Netherlands
- Occupation: Actor
- Years active: 1959 – 2003
- Spouse: Ivonne Bernarda van Elburg (married 1959–2009)
- Children: 3

Pieter Lutz (13 August 1927 – 20 August 2009) was a Dutch actor best known for his role as Fred in the Dutch sitcom Het Zonnetje in Huis. His older brothers Ton and Luc were also actors and he is the uncle of Dutch actor Joris Lutz. Lutz graduated from Theaterschool in 1954 and made his debut in A Midsummer Night's Dream by William Shakespeare. Over the course of his career, he appeared in many films, including the horror film De Lift and The Crab with the Golden Claws. He also played roles in other television series such as the Pride and Prejudice adaptation De vier dochters Bennet where he essayed the role of Mr. Collins.

Pieter Lutz married Ivonne Bernarda van Elburg (1940 – 2013) in Rotterdam on 26 February 1959 and the couple had three daughters. Pieter Lutz died in summer 2009 at the age of 82 from cardiac arrest.

== Awards ==
- 1993 Nominated for a Golden Calf Award for Best Actor at the Netherlands Film Festival
