= Risky Creek =

Stream in Alaska, United States

Coordinates: 68°51′32″N 165°18′49″W

Risky Creek is a stream in North Slope Borough, Alaska, in the United States. It flows to the Chukchi Sea.

Risky Creek was so named in 1953 because it is considered the last landing spot for boats for several miles.

== See also ==
- List of rivers of Alaska
