= Risqué (group) =

Dutch dance music group

- Origin: Netherlands
- Genres: Cosmic disco, electronic
- Years active: 1982–1985
- Label: Polydor
- Spinoffs: Doris D & The Pins

Risqué was an all-female Dutch dance music group from the early 1980s. The members were Dutch women Yvonne van Spluteren (later replaced by Denise van der Hek), Ingrid de Goede, and Irene van der Hoeven, and the British Donna Baron.

== Biography ==
The four women started out as dancers for the "Maria Moore Dancers" company. They often performed back up dancing for the famous Dutch show TopPop.

After they danced for the video accompanying the song Funky Town by Lipps Inc. they were asked to form the girl-group Doris D & The Pins with lead-singer Debbie Jenner.

After several hit songs, including Shine up and Dance on the record company was pushing for Debbie Jenner to be a more prominent lead singer, while the four "Pins" were given less and less prominence. The "Pins" complained, which triggered the record company to fire them, and they were replaced by four British back up singers/dancers. This led to a lawsuit, which allowed lead singer Debbie Jenner to keep using the name Doris D & The Pins. The four women then formed their own group, named Risqué.

They are popularly known for their Cosmic Disco club hits The Girls are Back in Town and Starlight and Burn it up (Mr. D.J.) which reached number 20 in the Dutch hit parade. The remixes of "The Girls are Back in Town" and "Burn it up (Mr. D.J.)" even entered the dance-charts in the United States.

Member Yvonne van Splunteren decided to leave the group to start her own children's clothing store, and she was replaced by Denise van der Hek in 1983.

They released several more singles with the new line up, like Shadow of your heart, Jimmy Mack and Go for it!, after which they split up in 1985.

== Discography ==
=== Albums ===
Album title	Release date	Charting in the Dutch Album Top 100			Comments
Album title	Release date	Date of entry	Highest	Weeks	Comments
Risqué - Special Extended Non-Stop Club Mix	1984	-			

=== Singles ===
Single title	Release date	Charting in the Dutch Top 40			Comments
Single title	Release date	Date of entry	Highest	Weeks	Comments
The girls are back in town	1982	06-03-1982	13	6	
Starlight	1982	03-07-1982	35	3	
Thunder & lightning	1982	11-09-1982	tip5	-	
Burn it up (Mr. DJ)	1983	24-09-1983	20	5	
Shadow of your heart	1984		tip14	-	
Jimmy Mack	1984		tip19	-	
Go for it	1984		tip15	-	
