= Babe (Dutch band) =

Dutch girl-pop band

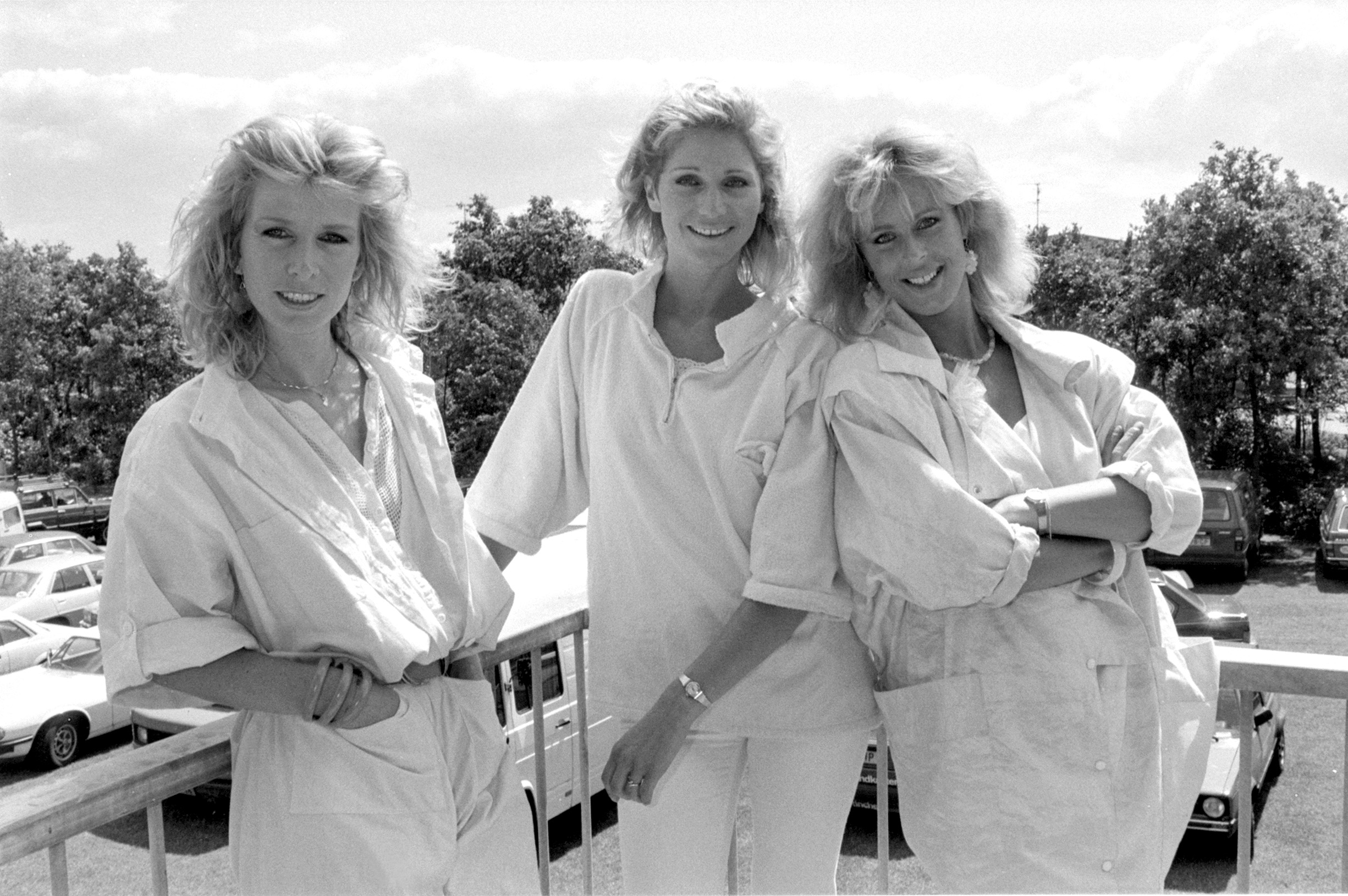

Background information
- Origin: Netherlands
- Genres: Pop, Nederpop, dance
- Years active: 1979–1986, 2026 - present
- Members: Marga Bult (1981 –1986, 2026 - present); Rita van Rooy (1979–1986, 2026 - present); Margot van der Ven (1980–1986, 2026 - present)
- Past members: Gemma van Eck (1979–1981); Monique Hagemeyer (1979–1980)

Babe was a Dutch girl-pop band in the 1970s and 1980s. The producer was Peter Koelewijn.

== History ==
Babe was designed after Luv', another very famous Dutch girl-pop band, mostly performing cheerful disco tunes.

The trio was formed by producer and performer Peter Koelewijn, and he produced all of their records. The only exception was the single Tick-a-thumps my heart which was produced by Hans van Hemert, the producer behind Luv'. Koelewijn had made this decision because he felt a change in sound was needed for the trio. However, fans did not appreciate the new sound, which was very much like Luv' because it no longer featured the recognizable solo vocals by Gemma Van Eck, but instead was sung in harmony by all three singers, so Koelewijn decided to take production back.

Initially the group consisted of Gemma van Eck, Rita van Rooy and Monique Hagemeyer. Hagemeyer was replaced in 1980 by Margot van der Ven. Van Eck decided to leave the trio in 1981 and was replaced by Marga Bult.

Although very popular at the time, Babe is considered the band in the Netherlands that had the most Top 40 hits without ever having a single placing within the top 10.

One of their singles, The Drunken Sailor was an old Irish sailor song, transformed into a bubblegum tune by Koelewijn.

Working with producer Peter Koelewijn, they recorded his composition, The Kiss (Viva Los Hombres). Backed with Tigers Play Too Rough, it was released on TTR WEAN 18.349 in September 1980. It was a hit in the Netherlands where it reached № 10 during its nine-week run. It was also a hit in Belgium, where it got to № 25.

In 1980 the trio participated in a famous song festival in Korea, performed for the Dutch Military in Lebanon, toured extensively through Indonesia, and made appearances in several TV shows in then East-Germany and Poland.

The trio finally disbanded in 1986 after their fame had gotten less and their music did not find many fans any longer. They did a final performance at the TT van Assen.

Marga Bult continued with a fairly successful solo career, which included her entry to the Eurovision Song Contest in 1987, where she performed Rechtop in the wind under the pseudonym Marcha. With 83 points she finished in a respectable 5th place in a field of 22 entries.

== Discography ==
=== Albums ===
Year	Title
1980	Babe
1981	Blitzers
1983	Shop Around
2003	Hollands Glorie

=== Singles ===
Year	Title
1979	Please me, please do
1979	(Never listen to a) Bouzouki player
1979	Wonderboy
1980	Ooh la la, I'm falling
1980	The drunken sailor/The Spanish shuffle
1980	The kiss (Viva los hombres)
1980	L.O.V.E.
1980	My Malaysia
1981	Mister Blitzer
1981	Tick-a-thumps my heart/Watch out for the big jump
1981	I'm a rocking machine
1982	Indian habits (Hooka Heya)
1982	Together in love again
1983	Explosive
1983	(Don't you ever) Shop around
1983	Dolly the doll
1984	Tommy is a winner
1984	Wanna do (what mamma said)
1984	Minnie the moocher
1985	Hot shot
1985	Tell him
