= Nogla =

Irish YouTuber (born 1992)

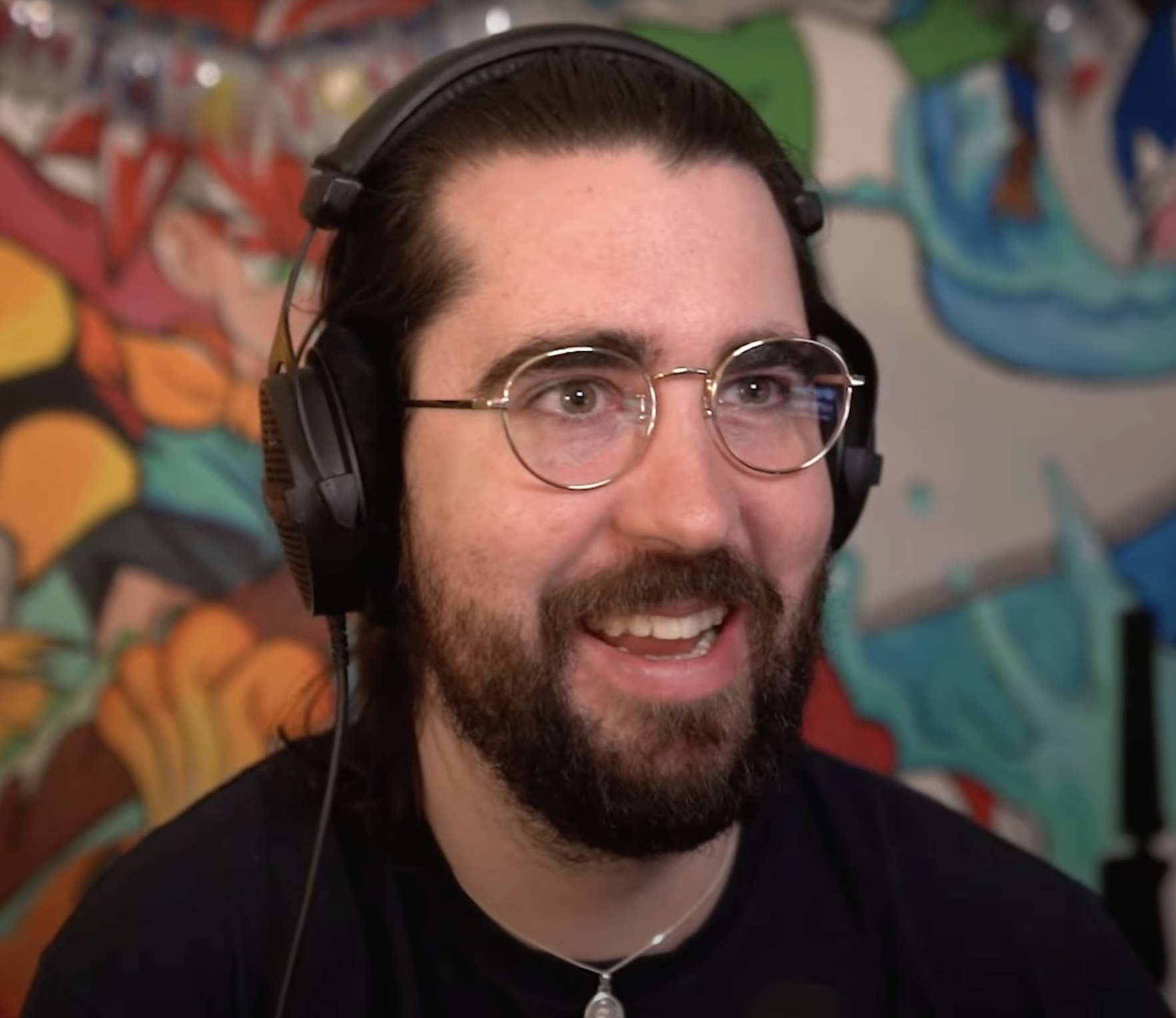
- Nagle in October 2023
- Born: David Martin Nagle; 6 July 1992 (age 34); County Limerick, Ireland
- Education: Institute of Technology, Tralee (dropped out)
- Occupation: YouTuber

TikTok information
- Page: Nogla
- Years active: 2020–present
- Followers: 1.1 million

YouTube information
- Channels: Nogla; Brogla; Nogla & Terroriser React
- Years active: 2012–present
- Genres: Let's Play; Gaming; Comedy; Entertainment
- Subscribers: 7.41 million (Nogla); 360,000 (Brogla); 1.05 million (Nogla & Terroriser React)
- Views: 1.82 billion (Nogla); 88.8 million (Brogla); 555.2 million (Nogla & Terroriser React)
- Last updated: 2 November 2026
- Website: nogla.shop

David Martin Nagle (Irish: Dáithí Máirtín De Nógla; born 6 July 1992), known professionally by his online name Nogla (formerly Daithi De Nogla), is an Irish YouTuber who produces gaming-related content. He has been described as one of Ireland's top YouTubers.

== Early life and education ==
David Martin Nagle was born a triplet on 6 July 1992 in County Limerick, Ireland. As a child, he would play video games on his brothers' consoles and dream about making his own calendar, later got his own Nintendo 64 at the age of 16. He studied early childhood care and education at the Institute of Technology, Tralee, before dropping out to work on his YouTube channel full-time. In 2014, during his time studying there, he reached a million subscribers on his YouTube channel.

== Internet career ==
Nogla began his YouTube channel in 2012 under the name 'Daithi De Nogla', making Let's Play videos of video games. He has been called one of Ireland's top or most successful YouTubers by The Times, The Irish Times, Irish Independent, and Irish Examiner. As of January 2025, he has the third most-subscribed channel in Ireland. His content features himself playing games with a group of online friends and content creators, colloquially known as the "Vanoss Crew", with its "leader" being fellow YouTuber VanossGaming.

In 2020, Nagle headed one of ten official YouTube gaming squads composed of online content creators to compete in the game Call of Duty: Warzone. The tournament's prize of $100,000 was donated to the Call of Duty Endowment in honour of Military Appreciation Month. Nagle officially rebranded his channel from 'Daithi De Nogla' to just 'Nogla' on Christmas Day in 2021.

He shares a channel with fellow Vanoss Crew member, Terroriser, where they discuss internet news and react to viral videos. On 13 October 2025, he transferred ownership of his secondary channel, "Nogla Plus", to his brother, Andrew; the channel was subsequently renamed to "Brogla".

== Personal life ==
Nagle is Catholic and a cousin of hurler Seán Finn. He purchased a bungalow in County Limerick, where he resides, and frequently travels to Los Angeles for his YouTube work. He has five siblings, including a triplet brother and sister. He and his fiancée, Aliyah, have a daughter who was born in 2019.
