= VanossGaming =

Canadian YouTuber (born 1992)

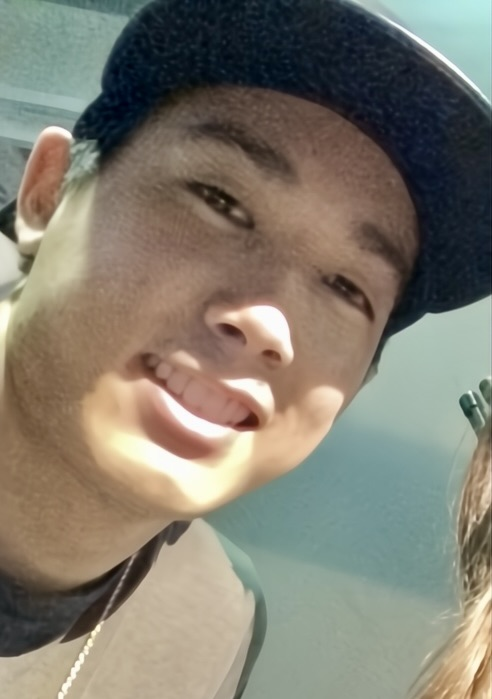
- Fong in 2016
- Born: Evan Fong; May 31, 1992 (age 34); Toronto, Ontario, Canada
- Other name: Vanoss
- Education: Richmond Hill High School; University of Pennsylvania (dropped out)
- Occupations: YouTuber; Internet personality; Producer; DJ; Musician

YouTube information
- Channels: VanossGaming; VanossGamingExtras
- Years active: 2011–present
- Genres: Gaming; comedy; entertainment
- Subscribers: 26 million (VanossGaming); 725,000 (VanossGamingExtras)
- Views: 17.2 billion (VanossGaming); 178.3 million (VanossGamingExtras)
- Musical career
- Also known as: Rynx (2017–2025)
- Genres: Alternative pop; EDM; Indie electronic; Pop-punk
- Years active: 2017–present
- Labels: Avant Garden; Island Records
- Website: Rynx (YouTube) evan fong (YouTube)
- Fong's voice During a recording session Recorded May 2023
- Last updated: November 9, 2026
- Website: vanoss.3blackdot.com

Evan Fong (born May 31, 1992), known online as VanossGaming (or simply Vanoss), is a Canadian YouTuber and musician. As one of the most popular gaming personalities on YouTube, his videography consists of montage-style videos of him and other creators playing various video games, such as Grand Theft Auto V, Garry's Mod, and various titles from the Call of Duty franchise. In 2011, Fong registered his gaming channel "VanossGaming" before signing with multi-channel network Machinima early in his career. Fong was regularly the most viewed Machinima channel during his time with the network; "VanossGaming" was also one of the most subscribed channels on YouTube during the 2010s. Fong has since developed into a central figure in the video game commentary subculture.

As a musician, Fong has released two studio albums, In Pieces in 2019 (under the name Rynx) and Speed in 2026. Additionally, he has starred in various animated shows including Paranormal Action Squad and Alpha Betas. Fong co-founded the record label and management company Avant Garden Records and the entertainment company 3Blackdot; in 2015, he helped produce 3Blackdot's first video game, Dead Realm. He has also featured in other media, spanning from a mobile game partnership series to music produced by a co-creator.

Fong was nominated for "Trending Gamer" in 2014 at The Game Awards and was nominated as the best in "Gaming" at the 8th and 12th Shorty Awards. During the 2010s, he was often among the highest paid gaming YouTubers on the platform and in 2017, he was recognized by Forbes as one of the top gaming influencers. As of August 2026, his YouTube channel has over 26 million subscribers and 17 billion views.

== Early life ==
Fong was born on May 31, 1992, and raised in Toronto, Ontario; he is of Korean and Chinese descent. Although Fong never played video games that much when he was young, he did occasionally play more simpler video games "here and there", which included children's adventure and puzzle titles such as Freddi the Fish and Pajama Sam. Later in his youth, he played Duke Nukem 3D and said it was the first "violent game" he played; Fong frequently used cheat codes such as 'God-mode' or 'unlimited ammo' to make the game more enjoyable. He graduated from Richmond Hill High School and studied economics at the University of Pennsylvania, but he later dropped out in his second year to focus on his YouTube channel as a full-time commitment. He said that his parents were initially concerned that he was neglecting his studies in favor of producing content for his YouTube channel, admitting that "Even though there's a lot of potential for somebody starting a YouTube channel it's obviously not a guaranteed path."

Fong used to play ice hockey. He started when he was six and played it competitively for many years before he started his YouTube channel. Fong spent several years playing in the Ontario Junior Hockey League where he played for four different teams, Villanova Knights (2009–2010), Vaughan Vipers (2010–2011), Dixie Beehives (2011) and Aurora Tigers (2011–2012). As a forward, he played 127 games, scoring 24 goals, whilst racking up 49 assists, and 73 points. Fong revealed that whilst playing at youth level, he played against future National Hockey League (NHL) players Tyler Seguin and Jeff Skinner whilst the duo played in the Greater Toronto Hockey League with the Toronto Nationals.

== YouTube channel ==
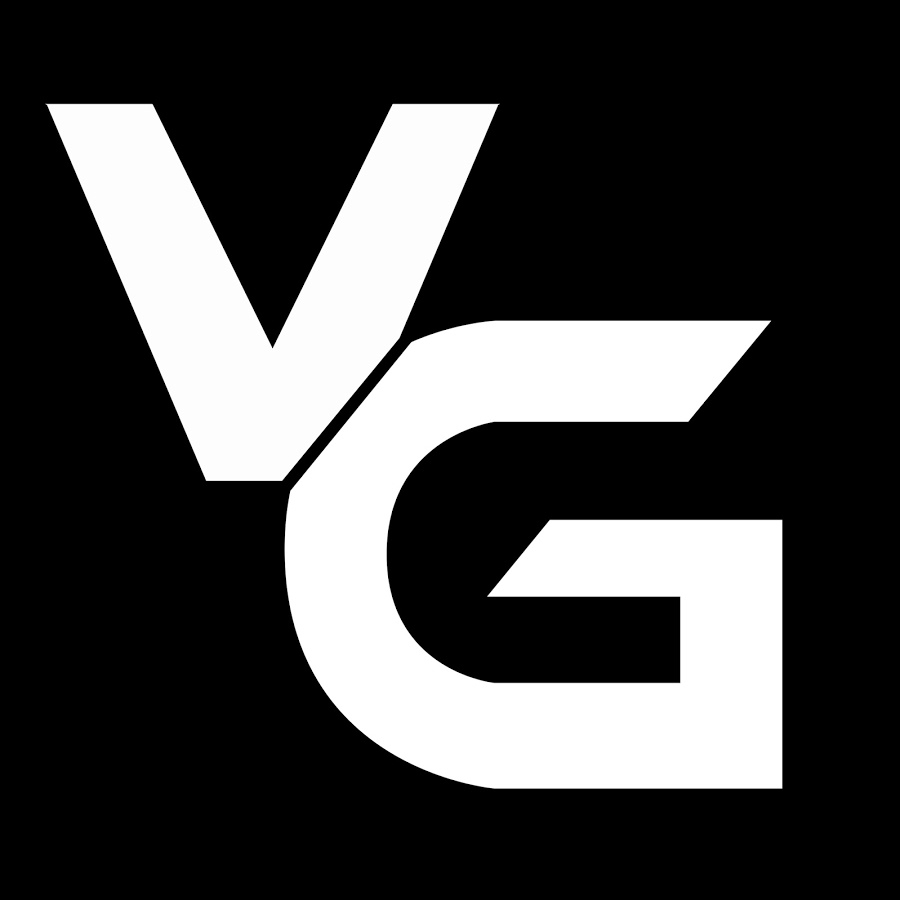
VanossGaming's logo used between 2011 and 2015

Fong created the VanossGaming channel on YouTube on September 15, 2011. The name "Vanoss" comes from VANOS, (Note: VANOS is derived from the German term "variable Nockenwellensteuerung", translating to variable camshaft control) a variable valve timing system produced by German automobile company BMW; Fong's father used the alias "vanoss62" (Note: Which likely refers to the S62 engine, BMW's first V8 engine to have double-VANOS) on a PlayStation 3, which his son later adopted for his own. Fong began to receive mainstream media attention as his channel approached 11 million subscribers in 2015. Speaking at the time, he suggested that his success could be credited to the fact that "Viewers really like the authentic type of content from regular people just playing games because they can relate to that". Fong's channel is said to capitalize from the "subculture of young people [that] are tuning out of TV" and preferring online content, specifically video game commentary.

Fong signed with the multi-channel network (MCN) Machinima early in his career and was their most viewed channel in December 2015. On April 30, 2015, Fong announced on Twitter that he had signed with Jetpak (stylized as JETPAK), an MCN founded by former YouTubers Adam Montoya and Tom Cassell, along with several former Machinima employees. Fong released a new logo for the VanossGaming brand in November 2015, the "owl themed" design is based on his Grand Theft Auto Online avatar, which is also available to play as on Watch Dogs: Legion.

Fong's content has earned him multiple award nominations, including two Shorty Awards for Tech and Innovation, under the category of Gaming, losing out to Rooster Teeth's Let's Play and NoisyButters in 2016 and 2020 respectively. On March 6, 2015, he appeared on the "YouTube Gaming Evolution" panel at PAX East in Boston, Massachusetts, alongside panelists W1LDC4T43, Lui Calibre, Mini Ladd, TheBajanCanadian and JeromeASF. He has been recognized as a central figure in the subculture of video game commentary, with publications attributing his massive popularity to his sense of authenticity.

=== Video content and analysis ===
The majority of VanossGaming videos take the format of a montage or compilation, featuring various clips from a particular game session, usually featuring other video game commentators. The Canadian Press described "a typical Vanoss video" as one that features "Vanoss and a group of friends chatting, laughing and making jokes over gameplay from popular titles such as Grand Theft Auto V or Call of Duty: World at War."

Among a variety of content, Fong posts Garry's Mod exploit videos, often exploring and performing in different landscapes on user-created content servers. Fong never shows his face, but collaborates with other players and creators.

A 2018 study analyzing content creation format noted that VanossGaming is an established creator within the gaming genre. The study noted that the formatting and genres used by creators like Fong, Swedish YouTuber PewDiePie, and English creator KSI such as humor sketches, parodies, highlights, and compilations are widely emulated by newer channels.

Alongside PewDiePie and Sky Does Minecraft, Fong's channel was credited for the substantial growth in popularity of gaming content on YouTube during the 2010s; in 2018 the genre was the fourth most popular category on the platform. Fong's genre appeals mostly to boys and adolescents, with males accounting for over 80% of viewership in 2018. The format exhibited by Fong and similar creators has been described as a form of improvisational-comedy and as a madcap approach to the original style of video game commentary. Whilst they have been strong commercial advisories as they produce content within the same genre, PewDiePie's output has key differences to Fong's content. His footage nearly always feature his online friendship group within a small variety of games, whereas PewDiePie's footage usually features himself alone within a larger variety of games. When explaining why recording with friends improves his content, Fong in 2015 compared watching a movie by yourself to watching one with friends, saying "I'll laugh a lot more with friends as opposed to just watching by myself", also mentioning that his particular group of coworkers makes his content unique. Fong's social impact on boys and adolescents was analysed and published in the New Media & Society journal in 2018.

Fong's content is mainly "fast, funny moment videos" which compile the highlights of gaming sessions with his friends, eliminating what he calls "downtime" or uninteresting content. He uploads this format over 'let's play' content because young people have short attention spans and busy lives, the 'montage format' can be a "quick and funny video", which is far more engaging and is "exciting the entire time". Due to the nature of this format, he can spend almost an entire day searching, compiling and editing his content which in his view is a high quality video, and for larger projects, this process can take almost an entire week.

=== Popularity and wealth ===
I think the biggest [difference] is that more personal connection. How we feel just hanging out together as friends, that has always been the leading energy of our content. I think the audience these days wants that closer connection, that feel like they know us or whoever it is they're watching.

— Fong discussing the differences between a 'traditional celebrity' and a popular YouTuber.

Between 2015 to 2017, VanossGaming was one of the most subscribed channels on YouTube. On June 29, 2015, he was the 18th most subscribed channel on platform, he was also at one point the 6th most-subscribed channel which was not 'branded', (Note: i.e., does not belong to an organization or company) ranked behind only PewDiePie, HolaSoyGerman, Smosh, JennaMarbles and nigahiga. The American business magazine Forbes named Fong as one of the gaming industry's top influencers in 2017. During that year, Fong earned approximately US$15.5 million from his YouTube channel, making him the second highest paid YouTuber on the platform behind only DanTDM, who pulled in $16.5 million the same year. In 2022, he had an estimated net worth of $25 million according to Slice. As of June 10, 2026, the VanossGaming channel has over 16.9 billion views and 26 million subscribers.

=== Vanoss Crew ===
Fong often plays games with friends and collaborators, many of which feature frequently in his content. The "Vanoss Crew" have developed into some of the most recognizable gaming YouTubers on the platform, with the group collaborating on a selection of multiplayer games and producing merchandise that feature the group's logos and catchphrases.

On October 21, 2026, GamesBeat reported that the Vanoss Crew planned to rent a mansion in Miami in anticipation of the release of Grand Theft Auto VI, with Rockstar Games aware of the plans. In November 2026, the group launched a shared Twitch channel, formally identifying its 11 members: VanossGaming, Wildcat, Daithi De Nogla, H2O Delirious, Terroriser, BigJigglyPanda, MooSnuckel, Fourzer0seven, Lui Calibre, PastaroniRavioli, and BasicallyIDoWrk. (Note: Nagle, David Martin (November 14, 2026). Vanoss Crew GTA 6 Miami Announcement!. Nogla – via YouTube. The group's Twitch channel features an individual panel for each member in its About section.) The group also announced its first livestream on the shared channel and a merchandise set in partnership with collectibles company BLDBLZ, both scheduled for November 18, 2026.

== Other projects ==
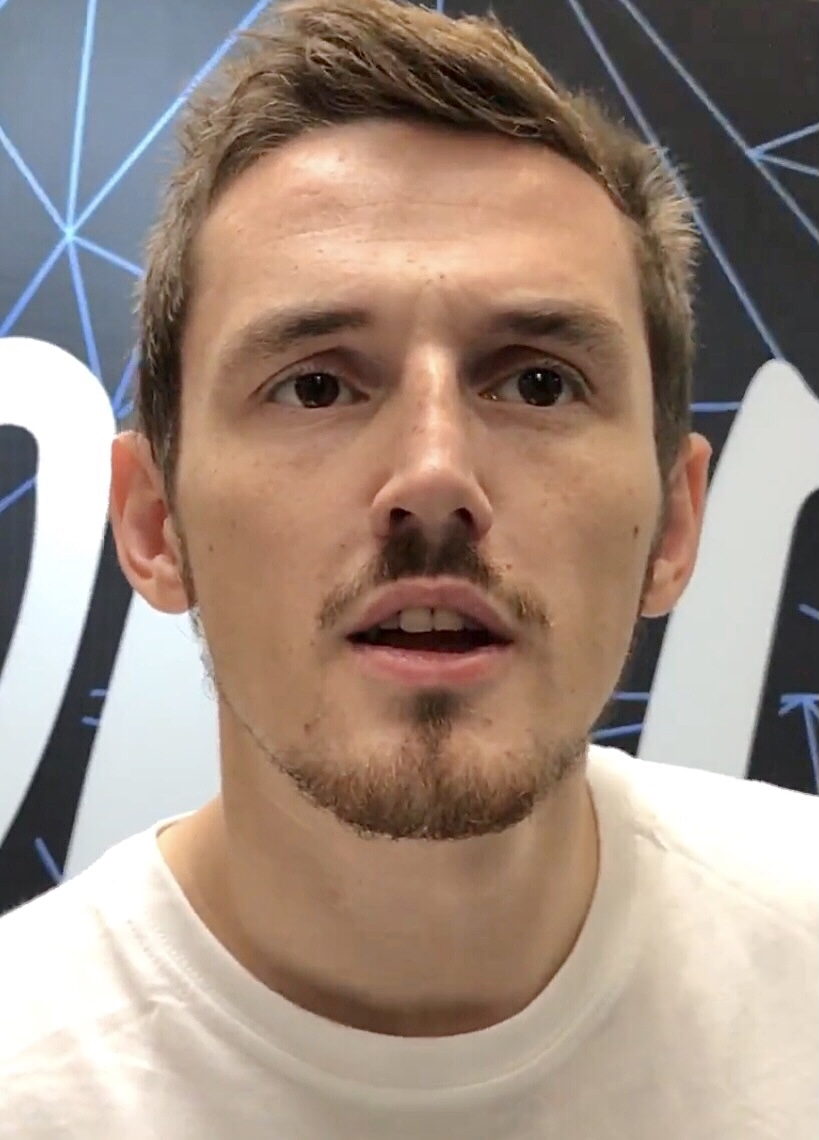
Fong co-founded 3Blackdot with Cassell (pictured in 2018) and Montoya in 2013.

Fong co-founded the entertainment studio and marketing firm 3Blackdot (stylized as 3BLACKDOT, or 3BD for short) in 2013 with fellow YouTubers Tom "Syndicate" Cassell and Adam "SeaNanners" Montoya. The studio has produced a selection of video games including Zombie Killer Squad, and the firm also matches advertisers with YouTubers through marketing and agency work. The production studio has worked on a variety of films, television programs and literature including co-financing and co-producing the critically acclaimed drama Queen & Slim and creating intellectual property for the New York Times best seller The Proudest Blue. In 2017, the company was sold to the French online media company Webedia for "several tens of millions of Euros". The US$87 million valued company was sold again in 2022 to company CEO, Reginald Cash, making it one of the few black-owned media companies in America.

Developed by Section Studios and published by 3Blackdot, Fong, Cassell and Montoya partnered on a video gamed entitled Dead Realm, a horror-style multiplayer PC game released via Steam as an early release on July 30, 2015; it was later fully released on May 25, 2017. Since the game was released, it has been reviewed over 4000 times on Steam, with a majority of the comments containing 'mixed' reviews. Whilst promoting the game on their respective YouTube channels, Fong, Cassell and Montoya did not disclose their financial ties with the video game, failing to comply with Federal Trade Commission (FTC) guidelines. Fong was the only promoter who made any attempt in disclosing his ties to 3Blackdot, mentioning in the text description of his first Dead Realm video: "We will also be releasing new ghost characters, human characters, and maps as time goes on...Thanks for all your support." According to Gamasutra (Game Developer since 2021) with input from an FTC representative, the statement "probably doesn't cut it" as it was not clear, conspicuous or upfront. On August 27, 2020, three years since its official release, 3Blackdot ended its support of the game, shutting down all of its servers and effectively discontinuing the game.

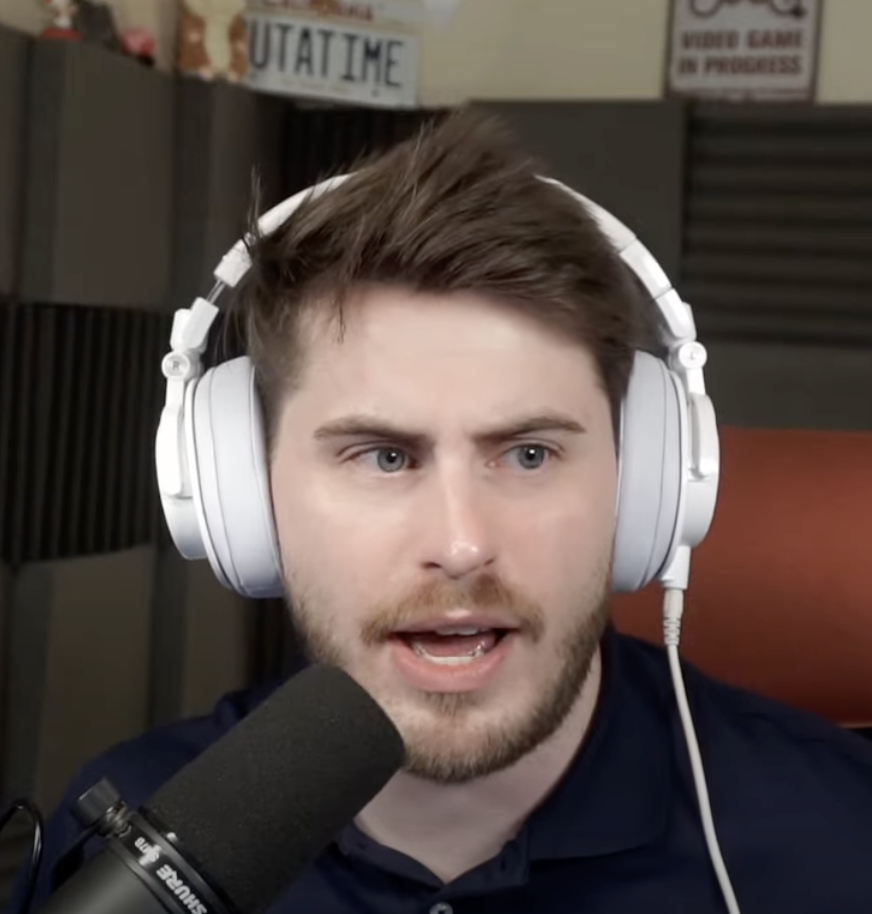
Co-creator Hanby (pictured in 2023) features alongside Fong in both The Magic Tomato and Alpha Betas.

Between 2016 and 2017, Fong partnered with Spanish game developer Social Point and his cofounded marketing agency 3Blackdot, to create the three-part animated series The Magic Tomato, to promote a mobile game developed by Social Point entitled Monster Legends. It was a series designed to grow outside of the integration which indirectly increased in-game user activity and drive game downloads. The series featured Fong and co-creators H2ODelirious, Terroriser, I AM WILDCAT, Lui Calibre and sp00n. By engaging the collective audience of 40+ million at the time, the animated-series and partnership was deemed a success and was later entered into the 9th edition of the Shorty Awards under the gaming category.

Fong featured in an animated series entitled Paranormal Action Squad, written by Michael Rowe, it aired on YouTube Red (YouTube Premium since 2018), on November 24. The eight-episode series follows the 'paranormal enthusiast' duo Paul (voiced by Montoya) and Eddie (Scott "Mr_Sark" Robison), as well as their owl-headed neighbor Vanoss (Fong) as they fight supernatural ghostly creatures. Bubbleblabber reviewer John Schwarz praised Fong and the cast's voice acting, but felt the show's overall premies was lost during the course of the series.

Fong, along with co-creators Brian "Terroriser" Hanby, Marcel "BasicallyIDoWrk" Cunningham and Tyler "I AM WILDCAT" Wine, produced and starred in an animated series entitled Alpha Betas. Premiering on March 13, 2021, on the VanossGaming YouTube channel, the show was created by Chris Bruno and David Howard Lee with production led by 3Blackdot and Starburns Industries. The series follows Alpha Team, a CIA-backed group of four gamers, Eddie, Tommy, Buck and Mason (voiced by Fong, Wine, Hanby and Cunningham respectively), as they play video games to keep the world in order through the world of gaming. The series also features John DiMaggio, Chris Parnell and Stephanie Beatriz in a variety of supporting roles. Following the premiere, 3Blackdot ran a successful Kickstarter campaign to fund the show, bringing in more than $1.3 million from over 8000 sponsors.

=== Music career ===
Rynx is one of the fast-rising artists coming out of Canada, and his tropical house track is the perfect summer tune, showcasing the artist's production and mixing talents across all genres.

— British music magazine Wonderland discussing Rynx's popularity, referring to his single "Read My Mind" featuring Mainland as a "tropical house track".

Fong co-founded the Los Angeles based record label and management company Avant Garden Records with Brittany Crawford and Azad Naficy. Under the pseudonym of Rynx, he joined Avant Garden as an artist specializing in electronic dance music (EDM) and indie electronic genres. Fong released his first song on August 25, 2017, a remix of "U-Rite" by hip-hop group They (stylized as THEY.). He later released his debut single "Want You" featuring Miranda Glory on December 12.

During 2018, Rynx released a selection of remixes including reworks of the Alison Wonderland song, “Cry”, and Gallant's "Doesn't Matter". In July, Fong released his second single "I'm Alright" featuring vocalist Jimi Ono; the electronic single was released with a nightclub-school themed music video. The following year, Rynx produced five more singles including "Hold On" featuring They singer Drew Love, "Read My Mind" featuring Mainland (with an accompanying acoustic single), "Club Poor" featuring Tiny Meat Gang, and "All for You" featuring Kiesza. Rynx was gaining a reputation as an artist who could pit "cutting edge hip-hop ideas against lucid electronics to create something startling, and absolutely new" according to Robin Murray from the British-based music magazine Clash. Fong released his debut studio album, In Pieces, on October 25, 2019 with a follow-up remix version on July 17, 2020.

Following a short hiatus, Fong returned to music production to release music under his real name, and released the single "Spawn!" in January 2025. In March 2026, he released the singles "Breathe" and "Pesos", which were described as Fong venturing into alternative pop and pop punk. Fong's debut album under his real name titled Speed was released on May 1.

== Selected videography ==
As of September 10, 2026

Top 10 most-viewed VanossGaming videos on YouTube
#	Video name	Views (mil.)	Upload date	Video
1	"Gmod Sandbox – The Toys Escape! (Garry's Mod Skits & Funny Moments)"	67.5	January 16, 2015	
2	"Gmod Deathrun – Spongebob Parody Map! (Garry's Mod Sandbox Funny Moments)"	53.8	April 11, 2015	
3	"Gmod: Five Minutes at Freddy's (Garry's Mod Sandbox Funny Moments)"	52.5	September 10, 2014	
4	"Vanoss Gaming Funny Moments – Best Moments of 2014 (Gmod, GTA 5, Skate 3, & More!)"	52.0	January 3, 2015	
5	"Gmod Sandbox Funny Moments – Sniper Battle, Ninja Vanish, C4 Cocoon! (Garry's Mod)"	49.9	August 28, 2014	
6	"GTA 5 Online Funny Moments – Bullet Proof Helmet, Trolling Ohm, ATV Fun!"	49.5	January 28, 2015	
7	"Five Nights At Freddy's Vs. Minecraft! (Left 4 Dead 2 Funny Moments and Mods)"	48.0	August 20, 2015	
8	"Gmod Adventure Map – 6 Challenges (Garry's Mod Sandbox Funny Moments)"	46.6	June 28, 2014	
9	"Gmod Deathrun Funny Moments – Minecraft Edition! (Knowledge)"	45.0	October 29, 2015	
10	"Gmod Minecraft!: Tutorials, Pictionary, Ender Dragon (Garry's Mod Sandbox Funny Moments & Skits)"	43.4	August 1, 2014	

== Discography ==
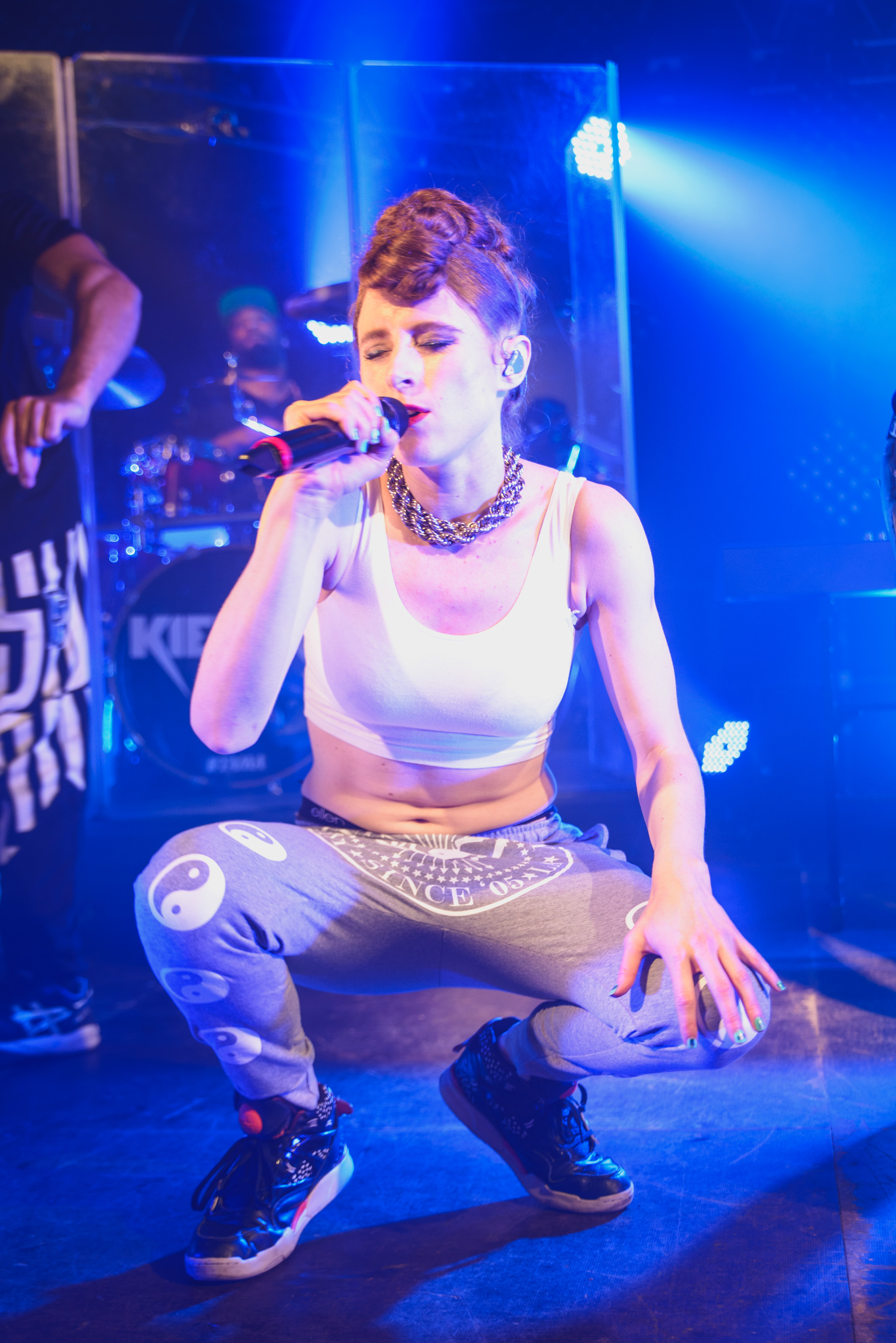
Canadian singer Kiesza partnered with Fong to produce the single "All for You" in 2019.

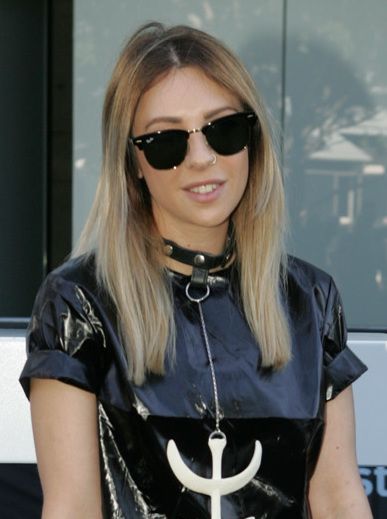
Fong remixed Alison Wonderland's "Cry" in 2018.

=== Studio albums ===
List of studio albums by Fong
Album	Details
In Pieces By Rynx	Released: 25 October 2019; Labels: Avant Garden, Island; Formats: digital download
In Pieces (The Remixes) By Rynx	Released: 17 July 2020; Labels: Avant Garden, Island; Formats: digital download
Speed By Evan Fong	Released: 1 May 2026; Labels: Avant Garden; Formats: digital download, LP

=== Singles ===
List of singles by Fong
Title	Year	Album	Released as
"Want You" (featuring Miranda Glory)	2017	In Pieces	Rynx
"I'm Alright" (featuring Jimi Ono)	2018	In Pieces	Rynx
"Hold On" (featuring Drew Love)	2019	In Pieces	Rynx
"Read My Mind" (featuring Mainland)	2019	In Pieces	Rynx
"Read My Mind (Acoustic)" (featuring Mainland)	2019	non-album single	Rynx
"Club Poor" (with Tiny Meat Gang)	2019	In Pieces	Rynx
"All For You" (featuring Kiesza)	2019	In Pieces	Rynx
"Spawn!"	2025	non-album singles	Evan Fong
"Miss Melancholy"	2025	non-album singles	Evan Fong
"This One’s for Me"	2025	non-album singles	Evan Fong
"Breathe"	2026	Speed	Evan Fong
“Pesos”	2026	Speed	Evan Fong

=== Guest appearance ===
Fong guest appearance
Title	Year	Artist	Album
"Shave My Balls" (featuring Cosmic & Nogla)	2019	Terroriser	non-album single

== Filmography ==
Evan Fong filmography
Year(s)	Title	Role	Network	Episodes
2016	Paranormal Action Squad	Himself	YouTube Red	8 (All)
2016–2017	The Magic Tomato	Himself	3BLACKDOT	3 (All)
2016–2017	YouTube Rewind	Himself	YouTube	2
2017	Vanoss Superhero School	Himself (Note: Also attributed as creator, writer and executive producer)	3BLACKDOT	2
2021–2022	Alpha Betas	Eddie Long (Note: Also attributed as an executive producer and voiced additional characters)	3BLACKDOT	6 (All)

== Awards and nominations ==
Evan Fong award nominations
Award	Year	Category	Result	Ref.
Forbes	2017	Top Influencers: Gaming	Won	
The Game Awards	2014	Trending Gamer	Nominated	
Shorty Awards	2016	Tech and Innovation: Gaming	Nominated	
Shorty Awards	2020	Tech and Innovation: Gaming	Nominated	

== See also ==
- List of YouTubers
- List of Chinese Canadians
- List of Korean Canadians
- List of people from Toronto
- List of people from Ontario
- Internet in Canada
- List of Island Records artists
