= Ina van Faassen =

Dutch actress and comedian

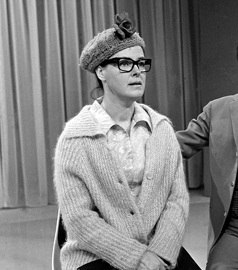
- van Faassen in 1969
- Born: November 19, 1928; Amsterdam, the Netherlands
- Died: July 23, 2011 (aged 82); Amsterdam, the Netherlands
- Burial place: Zorgvlied cemetery, Amsterdam, the Netherlands
- Occupations: Actress; comedian

Gesina Maria "Ina" van Faassen (19 November 1928 – 23 July 2011) was a Dutch actress and comedian.

She was born to Gerard Heinrich van Faassen and Johanna Christina (née Heerding). One of the leading Dutch stage actresses with more than 600 performances, she also starred in several television series.

In 1960, she married actor Ton van Duinhoven (died 2010). She died in 2011 in Amsterdam, at age 82, and was interred at Zorgvlied cemetery.

== Selected filmography ==
=== Television ===
- Het grote mes (1960)
- Makkers Staakt uw Wild Geraas (1960)
- De roof van de gordel (1964)
- Hans Brinker (1969)
- Waaldrecht (1973)
- De koperen tuin (1975)
- Ieder zijn deel (1976–78)
- De weduwnaar (1990)
- Mama's proefkonijn (1996)
- Oh oh Den Haag (2000)
- Polonaise (2002)
- Liever verliefd (2003)
- Hartslag (2004)
- Daar gaat de bruid
