= Adam Montoya =

American YouTuber (born 1984)

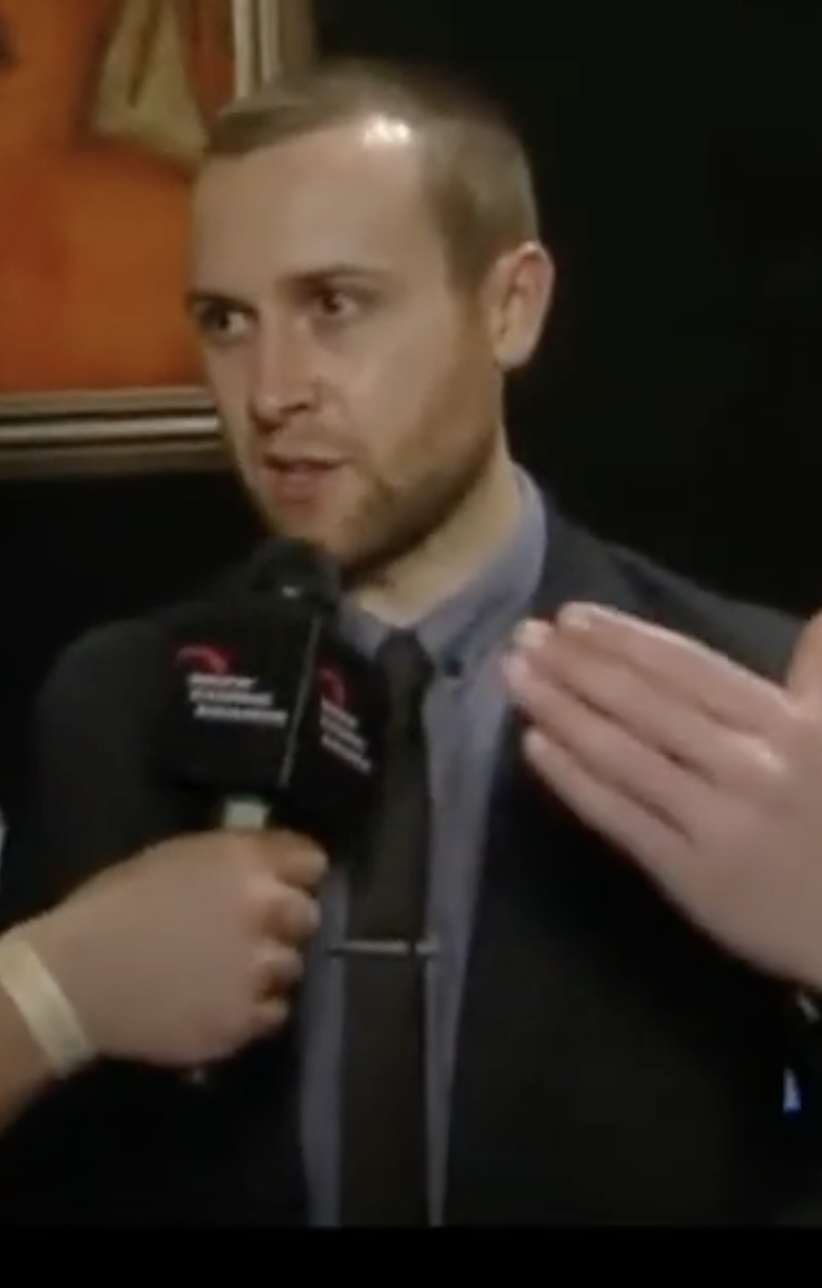
- Montoya at the Inside Gaming Awards 2011
- Born: June 12, 1984 (age 42); San Diego, California, U.S.
- Other name: SeaNanners
- Occupation: YouTuber
- Spouse: Cathy Diep (m. 2022)

YouTube information
- Channel: SeaNanners Gaming Channel
- Years active: 2009–2018; 2020–2025
- Genres: Gaming; comedy
- Subscribers: 5.28 million
- Views: 2.68 billion
- Last updated: September 6, 2026
- Website: seananners.com

Adam Montoya (born June 12, 1984), better known as SeaNanners, is an American YouTuber.

== Career ==
=== Early life and work ===
After graduating from San Diego State University, Montoya did freelance work such as filming weddings. During this time, Adam, finding inspiration from other early YouTube gaming commentators, decided to record and upload his own game commentaries.

=== Work with Machinima ===
On December 3, 2009, Montoya uploaded a video to his channel explaining that he was now partnered with Machinima, Inc. and that they would be posting his gameplay videos on their network channel. On June 14, 2010, Montoya posted a video to his channel stating that he was a full-time employee of Machinima.

=== JETPAK ===
On November 5, 2014, Montoya announced that he and his associates had launched a multi-channel network, JETPAK. He wanted to create a network that did not contractually take advantage of YouTubers and their channels. The network is operated by former Machinima employees.

=== The Paranormal Action Squad ===
On November 2, 2016, Montoya announced he would co-star with Scott Robison and Evan Fong in a new YouTube Premium original series, The Paranormal Action Squad. The animated comedy aired on November 16, 2016.

=== Break from content creation and return ===
In 2018, Montoya slowed down producing YouTube videos, going from at least one video per week for most of his solo career to only releasing five videos in 2018. Montoya did not officially state anything about a permanent retirement, but in guest appearances on friends' videos, he discussed taking a break from YouTube and video creation to get "passive income up and running, whether I'm doing this or doing that [...] looking heavily into real estate". On August 29, 2020, during his return, he cited several reasons such as mental health and stress for his two-year absence.

== See also ==
- List of YouTubers
- Rooster Teeth
