= Something to Crow About =

Studio album by The Riverboat Gamblers
- Released: June 3, 2003
- Recorded: 2003
- Genre: Punk rock
- Length: 28:50
- Label: Gearhead Records
- Producer: Tim Kerr

The Riverboat Gamblers chronology
The Riverboat Gamblers (2001)	Something to Crow About (2003)	Backsides (2004)

Something to Crow About is the second album by punk rock band The Riverboat Gamblers, released in 2003.

Professional ratings
Review scores
Source	Rating
AllMusic	4/5 stars
Spin	B+

== Track listing ==
No.	Title	Length
1.	"Let's Eat"	0:15
2.	"What's What"	2:15
3.	"Rattle My Bones"	2:08
4.	"Hey! Hey! Hey!"	2:02
5.	"Save You"	2:34
6.	"Sparks And Shots"	2:08
7.	"Ice Water"	3:05
8.	"Ooh Yeah"	1:57
9.	"Dead From The Neck Up"	2:19
10.	"Catch Your Eye"	2:24
11.	"Cut-Cut-Cut-Cut"	2:03
12.	"Last To Know"	2:42
13.	"Lottie Mae"	2:54
Total length:		28:50

== Personnel ==
The Riverboat Gamblers

- Mike "Teko" Wiebe – Vocals
- Freddy Castro – Guitar, vocals
- Colin Ambulance – Guitar, vocals
- Patrick Lillard – Bass guitar
- Jessie 3X – Drums, vocals

Artwork

- Jeremy Stoner – Layout and design
- Ike Taylor – Live photos
- Kris Pierce – Chicken eatin' photo

Production

- Tim Kerr – Producer
- Mike Vasquez – mixing
- John Golden – Mastering

Management

- Todd Cote – Booking Agent for Leafy Green
