= Kornman =

Kornman is a surname. Notable people with the surname include:

- Mary Kornman (1915–1973), American child actress
- Mildred Kornman (1925–2022), American child actor; sister of Mary
- Robin Kornman (1947–2007), Tibetan Buddhist scholar
- Tony Kornman (1884–1942), American cinematographer

Kornman may also refer to:

- Kornman, Colorado, a place in Prowers County, Colorado, United States

== See also ==
- Charles B. Kornmann (born 1937), United States federal judge
- Cornman (disambiguation)
