= Beat Me =

Studio album by Electric Eel Shock
- Released: July 4, 2005
- Recorded: November 2004 to December 2004 at Wisseloord Studios in Hilversum, The Netherlands
- Genres: Garage rock Hard rock Rock and roll
- Labels: Demolition; Gearhead; Spooky
- Producer: Attie Bauw

Electric Eel Shock chronology
Go USA! (2005)	Beat Me (2005)	Transworld Ultra Rock (2007)

Professional ratings
Review scores
Source	Rating

Beat Me is the sixth album of Japanese band Electric Eel Shock and was released in 2005.

The album was mixed and mastered from December 2004 to January 2005 at Bauwhaus Studios in Amsterdam, The Netherlands. The bonus tracks were recorded live at De Effenaar in Eindhoven, The Netherlands.

The song "I Love Fish But Fish Hate Me" has special meaning for Morimoto as a former competition angler. Amongst the reasons given as what inspired the song was "Fish don't want to get the hook in their mouth. I love fish but... yeah... I think they totally hate me."

A poster for this album appears in season two of the television show Kyle XY in the bedroom of the character Lori Trager (between the door and the closet).

== Track listing ==
All tracks are written by Electric Eel Shock, except track 12 written by Iommi, Osbourne, Ward & Butler.

No.	Title	Length
1.	"Scream for Me"	4:00
2.	"Bastard!"	2:46
3.	"I Can Hear the Sex Noise"	4:30
4.	"Don't Say Fuck"	3:18
5.	"Lemon Lees"	4:52
6.	"Killer Killer"	3:27
7.	"Slow Down"	3:35
8.	"Beat Me"	3:03
9.	"Rock & Roll Kills the Blues"	3:27
10.	"Mile End"	2:30
11.	"I Love Fish But Fish Hate Me"	3:18
12.	"Iron Man"	4:29
13.	"Zombie Rock'N'Roll (live, bonus track)"	3:19
14.	"Alright (live, bonus track)"	3:36

The track list is for the Roadrunner (Japan) release of this album. The Roadrunner (Japan) release of this album is also an Enhanced CD containing video clips for "Scream For Me" and "Bastard".

== Release history ==
Region	Date	Label	Format	Catalog
United Kingdom	July 4, 2005	Demolition	Stereo Compact Disc	?
USA	August 2, 2005	Gearhead	Stereo Compact Disc	?
USA	February 21, 2006	Gearhead	Stereo LP	?
Japan	March 2006	Roadrunner (Japan only)	Stereo Compact Disc	RRCY-21257
Australia	Unknown	Spooky	Stereo Compact Disc	Spooky021

The Roadrunner release was issued under license from Demolition.

== Personnel ==
- Akihito Morimoto – Guitar/Vocals
- Kazuto Maekawa – Bass
- Tomoharu "Gian" Ito – Drums
- Attie Bauw – Producer, Engineer, Mixing and Mastering
- Tim Bray – Assistant Engineer
- Akihiro Shiba – Mastering for Japanese bonus tracks
- Bob Slayer – EES Shogun & Manager
