= Gito =

Gito may refer to:

== Entertainment ==
- Gitogito Hustler, a Japanese all-female punk rock band
- Gito, l'ingrat, a 1992 Burundian comedy film directed by Léonce Ngabo

== People ==
- Gito (name), a list of people with the name

== Places ==
- Gito, Iran, a village in Hamadan Province, Iran
