= Ryan Cownie =

American stand-up comedian

- Born: Ryan Patrick Cownie; 1987 or 1988 (age 37–38); Sioux City, Iowa
- Education: Lincoln Southwest High School
- Occupation: Stand-up comedian
- Years active: 2007-present

Ryan Patrick Cownie is an American stand-up comedian originally from Lincoln, Nebraska. His album I Can't Die, which includes a theme song by Riverboat Gamblers' Mike Wiebe, was released by Dan Schlissel's Stand Up! Records in 2019. Comedy site Laughspin called him "a future superstar."

== Early life ==
Cownie was born in Sioux City, Iowa and grew up in Lincoln, Nebraska. He is a 2007 graduate of Lincoln Southwest High School. His comedic influences include the movies The Jerk and The Wedding Singer. He began performing at age 17. He moved to nearby, larger Omaha soon after graduating and worked as a waiter in a comedy club.

== Career ==
Cownie's comedy often riffs on pop culture, including a long-running gag in which he pretends his comedy has been sponsored by Mountain Dew and other corporate products.

Cownie moved to the larger city of Austin, Texas in 2010 to establish his career in comedy, along with fellow Nebraska comic Cody Hustak. The two would later take first and second place respectively in the prestigious annual Cap City Funniest Person in Austin contest in 2014. Cownie quickly became an integral part of the Austin comic scene, hosting the Avalanche Comedy showcase from 2013 to 2015. Avalanche was praised for its "laid-back vibe" by The Austinot website. Cownie is also a musician and rapper. With Dustin Svehlak, Cownie co-wrote and directed Cownie, a 2013 mockumentary that Moontower Comedy News called "funny and dry."

Cownie moved again to Los Angeles in 2015 to further his comedy career.

Cownie's debut album I Can't Die was released in 2019. Riverboat Gamblers frontman Mike Wiebe recorded a theme song for the album, also titled "I Can't Die." Nicholas C. Martinez of comedy site Laughspin gave it an approving review, calling Cownie "a future superstar."

In 2019, Cownie starred in the video for "Fashion Forward", a song by Wiebe's side project Drakulas.

Cownie appeared in the 2020 series Munchie Run on the Social Club TV streaming network.

== Personal life ==
Cownie was vegan.

== Discography ==
- I Can't Die (Stand Up! Records, 2019)

== Podcast appearances ==
Heavy Friending, "How I Met Comedian Ryan Cownie's Mother" (August 26, 2019)
Comedy Wham Presents, "Ryan Cownie Gets Raw" (October 6, 2017)
Booker, Alex & Sara, "Jay Whitecotton, Ryan Cownie & Bob Khosravi" (April 22, 2015)
Austin Sessions, Episode 48: Ryan Cownie (March 25, 2014)
Death Is Imminent, "Constantine, Poop, and Harry Potter, with Ryan Cownie" (August 16, 2018)
