= Cornman =

Cornman may refer to:

- Cornman: American Vegetable Hero, a 2001 film directed by Barak Epstein
- "Cornman," a song on the album Kinky by Kinky
- Evans v. Cornman (1970), United States Supreme Court case
