= Go Europe! =

Studio album by Electric Eel Shock
- Released: 2004
- Recorded: 2004
- Genres: Garage rock Rock and Roll
- Length: ??:??
- Labels: Demolition; Bitzcore
- Producer: Electric Eel Shock

Electric Eel Shock chronology
Slayers Bay Blues (1999)	''Go Europe!'' (2004)	Go USA! (2005)

Go Europe! is the fourth album of Japanese band Electric Eel Shock and was released in 2004 in Europe. This album was renamed and released also as Go USA!.

Track numbers in the following production information refers to the Bitzcore release of Go Europe!. Tracks 1, 8, 9, 11, 12, 13, 14, 15, and 16 were recorded at Sound Studio Face, Tokyo, Japan by Electric Eel Shock. Tracks 2, 3, 4, 5, 6, 7, and 10 were recorded at 2 kHz, London, England by Sean Doherty. All tracks except 11, 14, and 15 were mixed and co-produced by Sean Doherty. Tracks 11, 14, and 15 were mixed and co-produced by Richard Narco. The album was mastered by Doug Shearer at Townhouse Studios, London, England.

== Track listing ==
This track listing corresponds to the Bitzcore release of Go Europe!.

All tracks are written by Electric Eel Shock.

No.	Title	Length
1.	"Japanese Meets Chinese in USA"	2:46
2.	"My Tiger"	1:59
3.	"Do The Metal"	3:00
4.	"Waaaa"	3:12
5.	"Punctured"	2:28
6.	"Rock 'N' Roll Can Rescue The World"	2:56
7.	"S.O.S."	4:15
8.	"Suicide Rock 'N' Roll"	2:21
9.	"Puma"	2:59
10.	"Nothing"	1:59
11.	"Vegas Night"	3:38
12.	"Zombie Rock 'N' Roll"	3:02
13.	"I Wanna Be A Black Sabbath Guy, But I Should Be A Black Bass"	2:59
14.	"Speedy Joe"	3:12
15.	"Suicide Rock 'N' Roll"	2:20
16.	"Rock 'N' Roll Can Rescue The World"	2:58

Tracks 15 and 16 are Enhanced CD content (video clips).

The Demolition release of Go Europe! in the UK has a different track order with two additional songs ("Mathesar" and "Joyride Rock'N'Roll") and is not an Enhanced CD:

No.	Title	Length
1.	"Suicide Rock 'N' Roll"	2:21
2.	"Vegas Night"	3:38
3.	"Rock 'N' Roll Can Rescue The World"	2:56
4.	"Zombie Rock 'N' Roll"	3:02
5.	"Waaaa"	3:12
6.	"Puma"	2:59
7.	"S.O.S."	4:15
8.	"Mathesar"	?:??
9.	"Nothing"	1:59
10.	"Punctured"	2:28
11.	"Japanese Meets Chinese in USA"	2:46
12.	"My Tiger"	1:59
13.	"Joyride Rock'N'Roll"	?:??
14.	"I Wanna Be A Black Sabbath Guy, But I Should Be A Black Bass"	2:59
15.	"Speedy Joe"	3:12
16.	"Do The Metal"	3:00

== Release history ==
Region	Date	Label	Format	Catalog
Europe	May 2004	Bitzcore	Stereo Compact Disc	bc 1748
UK	July 2004	Demolition	Stereo Compact Disc	?
Japan	December 2004	Demolition	Stereo Compact Disc	?

== Personnel ==
- Akihito Morimoto - Guitar/Vocals
- Kazuto Maekawa - Bass
- Tomoharu "Gian" Ito - Drums
- Bob Slayer - Manager
