= Audiotraffic =

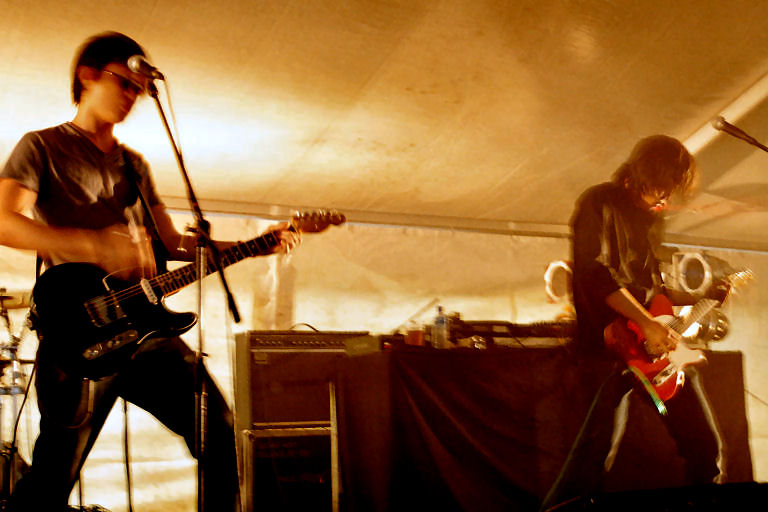

Background information
- Origin: Hong Kong
- Genres: Indie rock
- Years active: 1996–2009
- Labels: Unsigned
- Past members: Adrian Da Silva; Don Cruz; Wade Bolingbroke; Alex Lee; Woo Joo Lee (1998-2006); Masaki Heung (2003-2006); David Pun; Glenn Bogador; Ferdie Ramos

Audiotraffic were an indie rock band from Hong Kong. Formed in 1996, their music is reminiscent of British indie bands.

== History ==
After playing in a short lived grunge cover band together in their teens, Adrian Da Silva and Don Cruz regrouped in the summer of 1996 to write Brit/indie-rock style music, a relatively new musical direction for them. After recording a demo and recruiting bassist Wade Bolingbroke and drummer Alex Lee, 'Cry' (later renamed Audiotraffic) was signed to Wings Music Entertainment.

In 1998, Cry's first album was recorded and produced by Benjamin LeFevre, a music veteran who has worked with the likes of Pet Shop Boys, The Rolling Stones and Van Halen. Adrian and Don travelled to London to do a final mixing of their CD, spending just 11 days on recording and post production. Wade and Alex left the band for personal reasons and were replaced by Woo Joo Lee and Masaki Heung respectively.

The band has since spent the last few years playing at various venues and events, appearing on television, film, radio, online and in print. One of the highlights of their career has been opening and supporting the British rock group Mansun on their 1999 tour of Hong Kong. The band was particularly grateful for the personal praise and encouragement that they received from Mansun following their performance. They have also opened for Rialto, Swedish group Prime STH, and Brett Anderson and Bernard Butler’s band The Tears. Now independent from Wings Music Entertainment and as of 2003 renamed 'Audiotraffic', the band continued on their path to bring their music to a larger audience.

Audiotraffic actively contributed to the Hong Kong entertainments scene having co-written and performed on the soundtrack for the 2003 Eason Chan and Louis Koo film 'Naked Ambition', and appeared in Jackie Chan's 2004 film 'New Police Story'. They have been a popular act at the Rockit Hong Kong Music Festival in 2003 and 2004, sharing the main stage with artists such as The 5.6.7.8's (the band from the Tarantino film Kill Bill: Vol. 1), Aqualung, Electric Eel Shock, and The Cooper Temple Clause. In 2005 they were relegated to the Marquee Stage at the festival to make way for other local bands.

In 2004, Audiotraffic were the winners of the Hong Kong region in the World Battle of the Bands competition . As regional finalists they qualified to represent Hong Kong at the World final held in Auckland, New Zealand, where they competed with other finalists from the Asia Pacific region. Audiotraffic lost out to the local Kiwi finalists, but received an honorable mention from the judges. Whilst in New Zealand, Audiotraffic toured the country for two weeks with the other finalists making several TV appearances and radio broadcasts.

== Trivia ==
- Before signing to Wings Music Entertainment in 1998, the band rejected a chance to sign to PolyGram Records due to artistic differences with their proposed producer.
- Audiotraffic's members hail from all over East and Southeast Asia - Adrian is from Hong Kong, Don from Malaysia, Woo Joo is from South Korea, Masaki from Hong Kong, and Glenn and Ferdie from the Philippines.
- Adrian was a VJ on Channel [V] International from 1999 to 2002. Audiotraffic (at the time still named Cry) performed on the final episode of Channel [V]'s 'Top 5 at 5' in the summer of 2002.

== Discography ==
=== EPs ===
- Cry (1998)
- Audiotraffic (2008)
