= Rockit Hong Kong Music Festival =

Annual music festival (2003–2006)

- Genre: Rock, rap, indie
- Locations: Victoria Park, Causeway Bay, Hong Kong
- Years active: 2003–2006
- Founders: NJ Fujii, Didier Lee

Rockit Hong Kong Music Festival was held each autumn from 2003 to 2006 in Hong Kong's Victoria Park. The event was created by Nimal Jayawardena (AKA NJ Fujii) and Didier Li of Matrix Entertainment Group.

== 2003 ==
The first Rockit festival, 25–26 October 2003, was headlined by Japanese Metal Band Electric Eel Shock and Australia's Regurgitator.

- Electric Eel Shock
- Regurgitator
- The Feelers
- Finley Quaye
- Mark Gardener
- Gold Rush
- Six by Seven
- DJ Marky & XRS
- Stamina MC
- A Guy Called Gerald
- DJ Suv Live Showcase
- Leslie Loh
- Spanish Harlem Orchestra
- DJ Bodhi
- Simon Pang
- Uncle Joe
- Audiotraffic
- White Label
- Whence He Came
- P.N.S.
- Boombox Soundsystem
- SemIQ
- Buddhiston

== 2004 ==
In 2004 the event coincided with a three-day weekend (22–24 October) so the organisers extended the event to the Friday afternoon. The headliners were The Cooper Temple Clause on the Saturday and Regurgitator on the Sunday.

- The Cooper Temple Clause
- Regurgitator
- Aqualung
- Dive Dive
- 5,6,7,8′s
- DJ Krust
- DJ Die
- Dynamite MC
- MC Tali
- Amil Khan
- Joris Voorn
- DJ Godfather
- Josie Ho
- The Pancakes
- Audiotraffic
- DJ Kien Lieu
- Invincible
- Waxed Apple
- King Ly Chee
- My Little Airport
- DJ Tommy
- 22 Cats
- Kai Hii Kitora
- Zoundz
- Over A Dogma
- Alok′s 31G
- Malfunction
- Robot
- Garoupa
- Nude
- Nothing None
- Fantastic Day
- Flowers of Babylon
- Climax
- UNiXX

== 2005 ==
Rockit 2005 was held 12–13 November.

- Feeder
- DJ Marky & Stamina MC
- Princess Superstar
- Joris Voorn
- Thierry Nkeli Faha
- Soler
- The Academy
- Uptown Rockers
- Robot
- Shotgun She-ras
- Frankie Lam
- Qiu Hong
- Dirt Star
- Nude
- Hardpack
- SiQ
- Helter Skelter
- The Darlings
- Ghost Style
- Little Fat Pig
- Natural City
- Audiotraffic
- We Shot Kennedy

Brian Jonestown Massacre were scheduled to headline the Saturday but cancelled 24 hours before the show.

== 2006 ==
Rockit 2006 was held 14–15 October.

- Ian Brown
- Goldie
- Anthony Wong Yiu-Ming
- Adam F
- Electric Eel Shock
- Tookoo
- Bryan G
- Frankie Lam
- Uptown Rockers
- Qiu Hong
- Little Fat Pig
- Robot
- The Yours
- Hardpack
- The Academy
- Shotgun She-Ras
- Garoupa
- Noughts and Exes
- Empire
- Atomic Bubbles
- dr.eggs
- The Sinister Left
- The Dragon Army
- Spencer Douglas

The Rockit Website has a video feature highlighting the local bands trying out to Play At Rockit. Interesting look at the Hong Kong Indie Music scene.

== Legacy ==
Rockit ceased in 2006, largely because of difficulties in securing necessary permissions from Hong Kong government. In 2009, the organisers announced a multi-stage music and arts event in Macau, called Mima Revolution. Music directors Jay Forster and Justin Sweeting together with Mike Hill went on to found the Clockenflap festival from 2008.

== See also ==
- Clockenflap
