= Go USA! =

Studio album by Electric Eel Shock
- Released: 2005
- Recorded: 2004
- Genre: Garage rock Heavy metal Rock and roll
- Length: ??:??
- Label: Gearhead
- Producer: Electric Eel Shock

Electric Eel Shock chronology
Go Europe! (2004)	''Go USA!'' (2005)	Beat Me (2005)

Professional ratings
Review scores
Source	Rating
Answers.com	link
Popmatters	link

Go USA! is the fifth album of Japanese band Electric Eel Shock and was released in 2005 in the United States. This album has the same tracks as the Bitzcore release of the album Go Europe!. Go Europe! was released before Go USA! in 2004.

Tracks 1, 8, 9, 11, 12, 13, 14, 15, and 16 were recorded at Sound Studio Face, Tokyo, Japan by Electric Eel Shock. Tracks 2, 3, 4, 5, 6, 7, and 10 were recorded at 2 kHz, London, England by Sean Doherty. All tracks except 11, 14, and 15 were mixed and co-produced by Sean Doherty. Tracks 11, 14, and 15 were mixed and co-produced by Richard Narco. The album was mastered by Doug Shearer at Townhouse Studios, London, England.

Go USA! was released by Gearhead Records in the United States under exclusive license from Electric Eel Shock.

== Track listing ==
All tracks are written by Electric Eel Shock

No.	Title	Length
1.	"Japanese Meets Chinese in USA"	2:46
2.	"My Tiger"	1:59
3.	"Do The Metal"	3:00
4.	"Waaaa"	3:12
5.	"Punctured"	2:28
6.	"Rock 'N' Roll Can Rescue The World"	2:56
7.	"S.O.S."	4:15
8.	"Suicide Rock 'N' Roll"	2:21
9.	"Puma"	2:59
10.	"Nothing"	1:59
11.	"Vegas Night"	3:38
12.	"Zombie Rock 'N' Roll"	3:02
13.	"I Wanna Be A Black Sabbath Guy, But I Should Be A Black Bass"	2:59
14.	"Speedy Joe"	3:12
15.	"Suicide Rock 'N' Roll"	?:??
16.	"Rock 'N' Roll Can Rescue The World"	?:??

Tracks 15 and 16 are Enhanced CD content (video clips).

== Release history ==
Region	Date	Label	Format	Catalog
United States	March 8, 2005	Gearhead	Stereo Compact Disc	RPM060
United States	Feb 21, 2006	Gearhead	Stereo LP	?

== Personnel ==
- Akihito Morimoto - Guitar/Vocals
- Kazuto Maekawa - Bass
- Tomoharu "Gian" Ito - Drums
- Bob Slayer - Manager
