= Crimes Act of 1825 =

U.S. federal law

- Long title: An Act more effectually to provide for the punishment of certain crimes against the United States, and for other purposes
- Nicknames: Federal Criminal Code of 1825
- Enacted by: the 18th United States Congress
- Effective: March 3, 1825

Citations
- Statutes at Large: 4 Stat. 115

Codification
- Acts amended: Crimes Act of 1790

Legislative history
- Introduced in the House by Daniel Webster; Committee consideration by House Committee on the Judiciary; Signed into law by President James Monroe on March 3, 1825

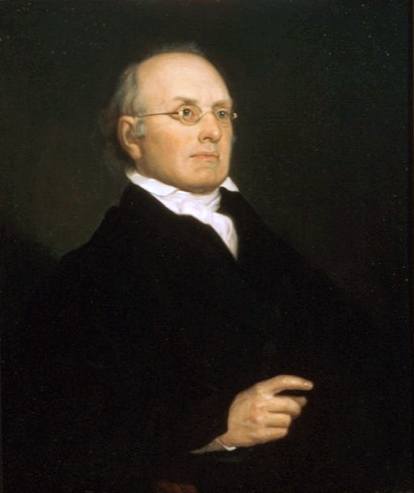
Justice Joseph Story drafted the Crimes Act of 1825.

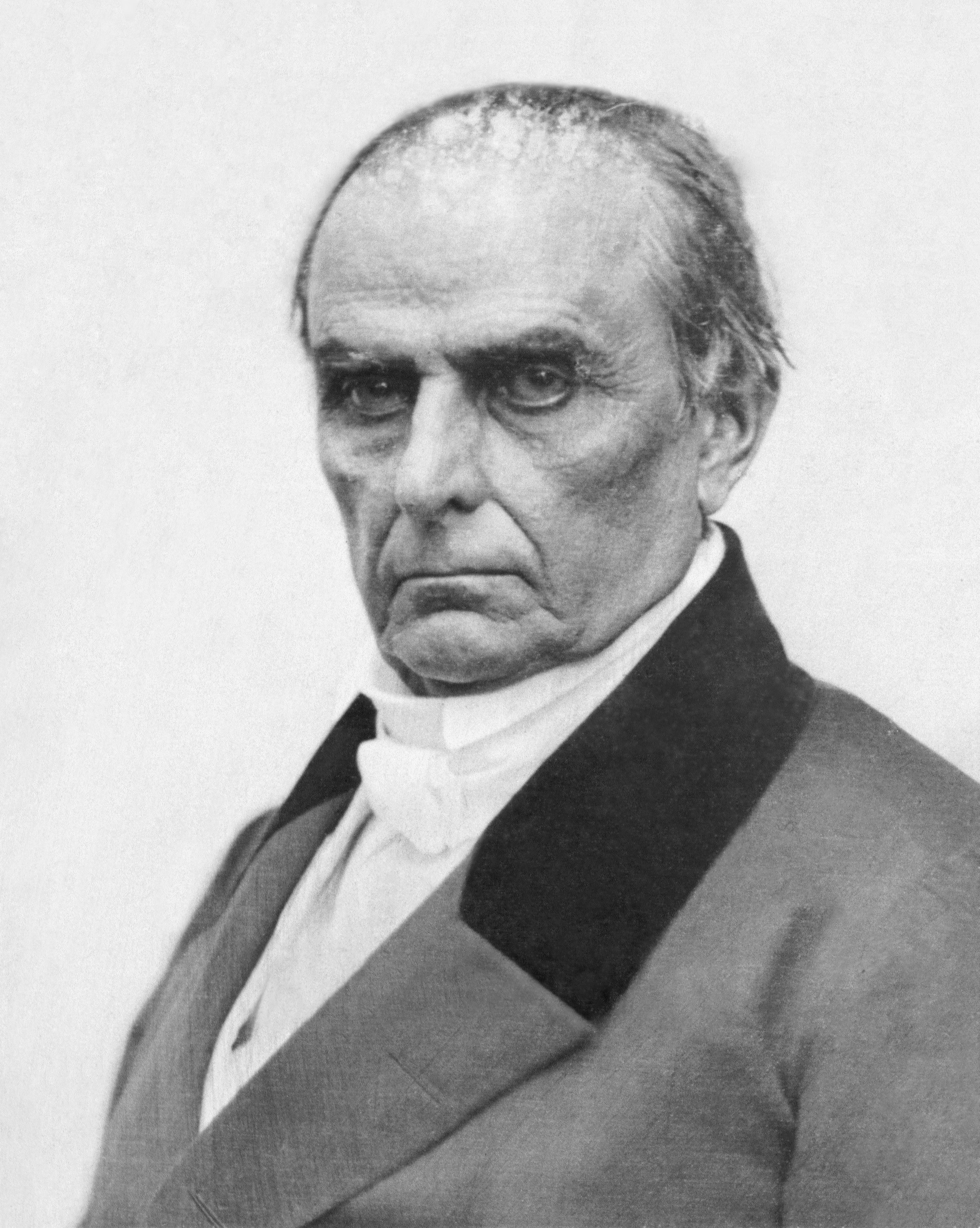
Representative Daniel Webster sponsored the Crimes Act of 1825.

The Crimes Act of 1825 (also known as the Federal Criminal Code of 1825), formally titled An Act more effectually to provide for the punishment of certain crimes against the United States, and for other purposes, was the first piece of omnibus federal criminal legislation since the Crimes Act of 1790. In general, the 1825 act provided more punishment than the 1790 act. The maximum authorized sentence of imprisonment was increased from 7 to 10 years; the maximum fine from $5,000 to $10,000. But, the punishments of stripes and pillory were not provided for.

Drafted by Justice Joseph Story, and sponsored by Representative Daniel Webster of Massachusetts, the statute defined a series of new federal crimes applicable in areas under exclusive federal jurisdiction—the District of Columbia, federal territories, and federal enclaves—as well as felonies on the high seas and under federal admiralty and maritime jurisdiction.

== Background ==
The Crimes Act of 1825 was "drawn along the same lines" as the Crimes Act of 1790, but "more comprehensive.” Justice Joseph Story was an advocate for expanded federal jurisdiction, and in particular argued that the Judiciary Act of 1789 authorized the federal courts to define and punish common law offenses. Although the common law crimes approach was rejected by the Supreme Court, "[w]hat Story was not able to do as a Justice he remedied through his friendship with Webster, then Chairman of the House Judiciary Committee." Other statutes drafted by Story include the Bankruptcy Act of 1841 and the Admiralty Jurisdiction Act of 1845.

Story began drafting a crimes act in 1816. Story drafted the act with the assistance of Representative Daniel Webster of Massachusetts, a frequent Supreme Court advocate. A contemporary manuscript by Story remarks that "few, very few, of the practical crimes . . . are now punishable by statutes, and if the court have no general common law jurisdiction . . . they are wholly dispunishable." Story continued:

The only question is, whether this is to be done by passing laws in detail respective every crime in every possible shape, or shall give the Courts general jurisdiction to punish wherever the authority of the United States is violated, and leave the Courts to settle this by legal constructions, upon common law principles.

Story preferred the common law crime approach:

Crimes are so various in their nature and character, and so infinitely diversified in their circumstances, that it is almost impossible to enumerate and define them with requisite certainty. An ingenious rogue will almost always escape from the text of the statute book.

Congress was not persuaded to follow the common law approach and postponed consideration of the statute indefinitely. Further attempts to create a new crimes act followed in 1818 and 1823.

== Drafting ==
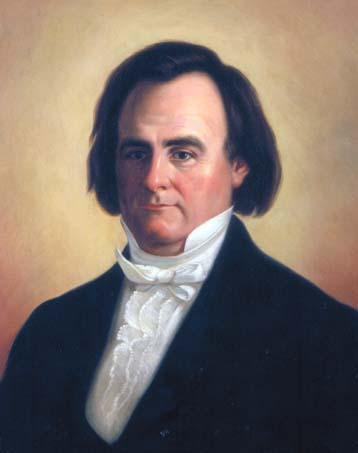
Congressman Charles A. Wickliffe objected to the expansion of the death penalty in the act.

In 1824, the House commenced consideration of the bill. The original draft contained only 16 sections, compared to 26 in the final draft. Representative Charles A. Wickliffe of Kentucky objected to the extension of the death penalty to crimes other than treason, rape, and murder. Representatives William Cox Ellis, James Buchanan, and Edward Livingston concurred with Wickliffe. Livingston was the "principal speaker against the act." Livingston moved to amend the act to remove the death penalty for arson.

Webster defendant the act, and defended capital punishment. Representative George Kremer offered an even more blood-thirsty defense of the death penalty. Eventually, Webster "successfully guided [the act] through Congress." According to Speranza:

As originally drafted by Story, this bill would have been a fairly comprehensive criminal Code, but through the disfavor of the members of the South it failed to pass in the House. It was finally adopted in a very crippled condition as the Crimes Act of 1825, re-enacted in the Revised Statutes of the United States.

The Crimes Act was passed on March 3, 1825.

== Amendments of prior acts ==
The Act provided that all prior inconsistent legislation was repealed (without specifying such legislation). According to Henderson, the act "supplanted" 12 sections of the Crimes Act of 1790, one section of the Piracy Act of 1819, the entirety of the Piracy Act of 1820, and the entirety of the Bank Act of 1816.

== Crimes created ==
"The Act of 1825 made several important contributions to federal criminal law."

=== Exclusive federal jurisdiction ===
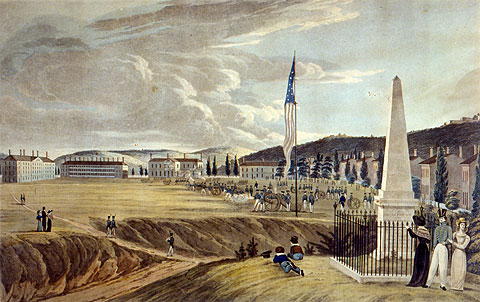
Paul held that a burglary at West Point (depicted circa 1828) could only be punished under the Assimilative Crimes Act pursuant to state statutes in force at the time of the Act's passage.

Building upon the Crimes Act of 1790, the 1825 Act created several new crimes applicable only to areas under exclusive federal jurisdiction—i.e. the District of Columbia, federal territories, and federal enclaves. Among these was the first federal Assimilative Crimes Act, which made the criminal laws of the surrounding states applicable to the federal enclaves.

Section	Common offense name	Authorized sentence	Supreme Court cases
1	Residential arson	Death	
2	Non-residential arson	10 years hard labor and $10,000	
3	Assimilative Crimes Act	Varies	United States v. Paul, 31 U.S. (6 Pet.) 141 (1832)

=== High seas and admiralty ===
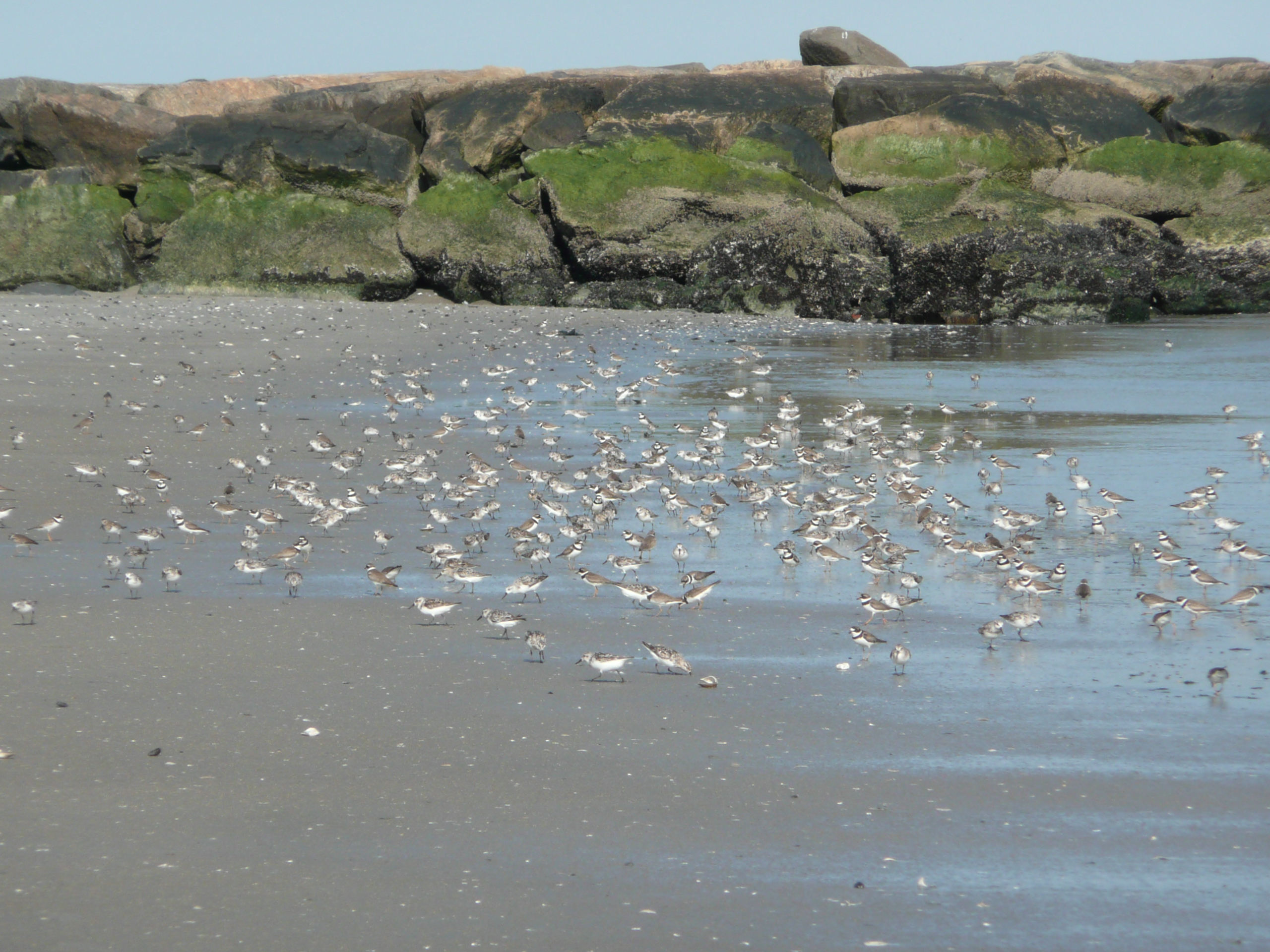
Coombs held that shipwreck theft above the high tide line on Rockaway Beach (pictured) could be punished under the Commerce Clause (but not the admiralty jurisdiction clause). Yet, Coombs held that § 9 had not exercised that power.

In effect, the Crimes Act of 1825 amplified the definition of "high seas" to include "any river, haven, creek, basin, or bay, within the admiralty and maritime jurisdiction of the United States."

In United States v. Coombs (1838), in an opinion by Justice Story (the author of the 1825 Act), the Court held that the offense of shipwreck theft under § 9 of the Act did not extend above the high tide line. But, Coombs held “probably for the first time, that the admiralty jurisdiction of the United States courts was an independent grant of legislative power to Congress.” Although Coombs held that Congress could not punish an act occurring above the high tide line under its admiralty jurisdiction, the Court also held that Congress could do so under its Commerce Clause power.

Section	Common offense name	Authorized sentence	Supreme Court cases
4	Murder (including deaths on land) and rape	Death	
6	Violent theft	10 years hard labor and $5000	
7	Vessel burglary or fixed floating object destruction	5 years hard labor and $1000	
8	Accessory after the fact to larceny	3 years hard labor and $1000	
9	Shipwreck theft or obstruction of shipwreck rescue	10 years hard labor and $5000	United States v. Coombs, 37 U.S. (12 Pet.) 72 (1838)
11	Vessel arson	Death	
22	Vessel burglary	3 years hard labor and $3000	

=== Public corruption ===
In United States v. Germaine (1878), the Waite Court held that the extortion under color of office offense applied only to defendants who were officers of the United States within the meaning of the Appointments Clause of Article Two. Because Germaine (a surgeon appointed by the Commissioner of Pensions) was not appointed by the President, a court of law, or a head of a department, the Court held that the statute did not apply to Germaine.

Section	Common offense name	Authorized sentence	Supreme Court cases
12	Extortion under color of office	1 year and $500	United States v. Tingey, 30 U.S. (5 Pet.) 115 (1831) (dicta); United States v. Germaine, 99 U.S. (9 Otto) 508 (1878); Williams v. United States, 168 U.S. 382 (1897) (dicta)
16	Theft or embezzlement by an employee of the Second Bank	10 years hard labor and $5000	
24	Coin embezzlement or dilution by a Mint employee	10 years hard labor and $10,000 fine; 1 year mandatory minimum	

=== Counterfeiting ===
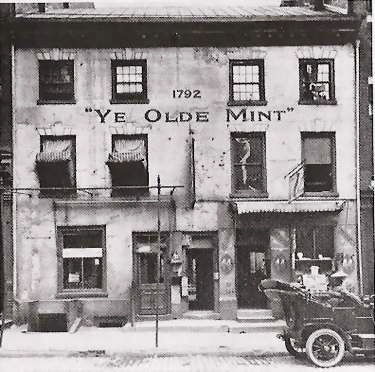
Coin counterfeiting had not been punished under the Crimes Act of 1790 because the United States Mint (pictured) had not yet been established.

The Crimes Act of 1790 had established only one counterfeiting offense, which was punishable by death.

Section	Common offense name	Authorized sentence	Supreme Court cases
17	Counterfeiting	10 years hard labor and $5000	
18	Counterfeiting the notes of the Second Bank	10 years hard labor and $5000	United States v. Randenbush, 33 U.S. (8 Pet.) 288 (1834)
19	Counterfeiting customs forms	3 years hard labor and $1000	
20	Counterfeiting gold or silver coins	10 years hard labor and $3000	United States v. Gardner, 35 U.S. (10 Pet.) 489 (1836); United States v. Marigold, 50 U.S. (9 How.) 560 (1850)
21	Counterfeiting copper coins	3 years hard labor and $1000	

=== Other ===
The Crimes Act of 1825 extended federal criminal jurisdiction to U.S. ships in foreign waters and foreign ports. Section 5 made any offense committed in such a place punishable as if it had been committed on the high seas, so long as the defendant had not previously been convicted or acquitted for the same conduct in a foreign court. Further, section 10 prohibited marooning.

Section 13 increased the punishment for perjury or subornation to 5 years hard labor and $2000. The Crimes Act of 1790 had limited the punishment for those crimes to 3 years, $800, 1 hour in the pillory, and incapacity to testify.

Section 23 made maritime insurance fraud punishable by 3 years hard labor and a $3000 fine. (Previously, such had been punishable by death.) In dicta in Coombs, Justice Story explained that this provision (which he had penned) "is also derived from the power to regulate commerce."

== Criminal procedure ==
=== Pleas ===
Section 14 provided for the entrance of a not guilty plea in cases where the defendant remained silent or refused to plea. (The Crimes Act of 1790 had established this rule for treason and capital cases.)

=== Venue ===
Section 14 also re-enacted the venue provision of § 8 of the Crimes Act of 1790, with minor changes in wording. Section 8 of the 1790 Act had provided that "the trial of crimes committed on the high seas, or in any place out of the jurisdiction of any particular state, shall be in the district where the offender is apprehended, or into which he may first be brought." Section 14 of the 1825 Act provided that "the trial of all offenses which shall be committed upon the high seas or elsewhere, out of the limits of any state or district, shall be in the district where the offender is apprehended, or into which he may be first brought." The 1825 wording appeared to ratify the holding of Ex parte Bollman, which had held that the Territory of Orleans—in which federal territorial courts were constituted—was not a place eligible for alternate venue under the 1790 Act.

=== Hard labor ===
Since no federal prisons existed, § 15 provided that a sentence of hard labor could be served in a state penitentiary within the federal judicial district of the sentencing court. Previously, a Congressional resolution accompanying the Crimes Act of 1790 had requested that the state make their prisons available to federal convicts. The 1825 act codified this.

== Aftermath ==
"[F]rom 1825 until the close of the Civil War, the few additions to the list of statutory crimes which were made broke little new ground."

There have been four revisions or re-codifications of federal criminal law since the Crimes Act of 1790: (1) the Crimes Act of 1825; (2) the Revised Statutes; (3) the Criminal Code of 1909; and (4) the 1948 re-codification of the United States Code. The latter three are merely re-codifications. "There has been no general revision of the criminal legislation of the United States since the Crimes Act of 1825, although there have been codifications of existing law, and, of course, many separate statutes adding greatly to the scope of federal criminal jurisdiction."
