= P-pop =

P-pop may refer to:

- Pakistani pop music
- Persian pop, popular music of Iran
- Punjabi pop, music genre from the Punjab region of India and Pakistan
- Pinoy pop or Philippine pop, popular music of the Philippines
- "P-Poppin", a 2003 song by Ludacris
- P-Pop-High School, a 2009 album by Peelander-Z
