= Slayers Bay Blues =

1999 album by Electric Eel Shock

Studio album by Electric Eel Shock
- Released: 1999

Slayers Bay Blues is the third album by Japanese band Electric Eel Shock and was released in 1999.

In 1999, Electric Eel Shock (EES) recorded Slayers Bay Blues on a multitrack recording, and pressed enough copies to take to the road for their first gigs abroad. They had lined up a handful of dates in and around New York City, including CBGB, with their friends Peelander-Z who had relocated there some time earlier. The gigs were a big success, and the handful of dates that were planned turned into an East Coast tour.

== Track listing ==
This track listing corresponds to the Micro Music, Double Peace Recording release of Slayer's Bay Blues.

All tracks written by Electric Eel Shock

Number	Title	Length
1	"Turbo Slayer"	3:52
2	"I'm Not"	1:46
3	"Puma"	2:43
4	"Orange Is Back!"	2:03
5	"Let's Go To The Beach"	1:41
6	"Vegas Night"	3:28
7	"Heavy Metal Vegabond"	2:06
8	"Jumping Akihito"	3:20
9	"Overkill"	2:39
10	"Kaza-Machine"	1:10
11	"Bingo Shoot!"	1:54
12	"ポルケレス・ポリフォリオ"	3:02

== Release history ==
Region	Date	Label	Format	Catalog
Japan	2000	Double Peace Recording / Micro Music	Stereo Compact Disc	MM-002

== More about release ==
EES left their native Japan in 1999 to see what they could make of America and they have been on a near constant world tour ever since. EES paid their way by selling merchandise and their self recorded album Slayers Bay Blues at their gigs. Headlining a stage at the Roskilde Festival in Denmark was a key early event for the band. By 2004 EES had toured 27 countries around the world.
