= Space Vacation =

Studio album by Peelander-Z
- Released: April 10, 2012
- Genre: Punk rock, new wave
- Length: 38:51
- Label: Chicken Ranch Records

Peelander-Z chronology
| P-TV-Z (2010) | Space Vacation (2012) |

Space Vacation is the seventh album released by New York City based Japanese punk group Peelander-Z, released on April 10, 2012. This album strays away from the band's Ramones influenced punk rock, towards a new wave sound prominently featuring keyboards, similar to Devo. Peelander-Z toured throughout 2012 to promote the album, with advanced copies of it for sale at the shows.

== Track listing ==
1. "Intro" – 1:58
2. "Space Vacation" – 3:56
3. "Under Zero Gravity" – 1:22
4. "Galaxy Smile" – 2:22
5. "Star Bowling" – 4:20
6. "Mr. Tea" – 4:01
7. "Big Bang" – 1:04
8. "K.M.G.T." – 0:29
9. "P-Radio" – 0:59
10. "Girls Just Want To Have Fun" (Cyndi Lauper cover)– 3:01
11. "Space Kiss" – 2:27
12. "Get Glasses" – 3:30
13. "Love Love Peelander-Z" – 4:43
14. "Sa Yo Na La-La" – 3:02
15. "Outro" – 1:46
