= Prison-A-Go-Go! =

- Theatrical Poster
- Directed by: Barak Epstein
- Written by: Barak Epstein; Mike Wiebe
- Produced by: Barak Epstein; Shane Stein
- Starring: Rhonda Shear; Mary Woronov; Laurie Walton; Travis Willingham
- Cinematography: Jim McMahon
- Edited by: Michael Fleetwood
- Music by: Alan Pollard; Tim Reed
- Distributed by: WorldWide International Picture Studios
- Release date: October 27, 2003
- Country: United States
- Language: English

Prison-A-Go-Go! is an American film first released in October 2003 by WorldWide International Picture Studios, known for producing low budget B-movies with campy concepts. The film premiered at the Deep Ellum Film Festival in 2003 and later won several awards. The film was directed by Barak Epstein and starred Mary Woronov and Rhonda Shear. The film is a parody/homage of women in prison films.

== Plot ==
The evil and incompetent Dr. Hurtrider kidnaps an innocent young woman named Callista to conduct experiments on her to cure diseases, even if she does not have any. It is up to her dimwitted sister, Janie, to solve the obvious clues left behind and rescue her little sister. By reading the business card left behind, Janie figures out that Callista has been taken to a prison in the Philippines. She kills a mentally handicapped man, and is sent to the prison, led by an equally inept warden. There she meets queen bitch Jackpot, and along with the stupid inmates, pathetic ninjas and a vast assortment of idiots, Janie figures out a way to rescue her sister and escape.

The film was marketed as being filled with multiple shower scenes, girls running amok, kung fu food fights, ninjas, mutant zombies, evil scientists, genetic mutation, and mud wrestling.

== Cast ==
Actor	Role
Rhonda Shear	Jackpot
Mary Woronov	Dyanne She-Bitch Slutface
Laurie Walton	Janie
Travis Willingham	Dr. Hurtrider
Lloyd Kaufman	Leibowitz
Lauren Graham	Callista
Mike Wiebe	Wilbur Thorn
Louisa Lawless	Cross-Eye
Tina Parker	Breezy
Mae Moreno	Boom-Boom
John Phelan	Zimmerman
Laura Bailey	Ginger

== Reviews ==
Ain't it Cool News gave the movie a positive review. However, this was during Harry Knowles' tenure when he was accused of taking bribes for positive reviews.

Terribly Awful in their season 2 premier not only took issue with the corruption of the positive review, but one of the presenters went on a five minute rant. Reviewer Matt Anderson went as far as saying that if he had known how bad the movie was, "I would have burned the DVD". The reviewer also went on to call it "The worst fucking movie I have ever seen", and co-presenter Craig M. Rosenthal said "It's embarrassing to any filmmaker out there".

== Awards ==
The film won several awards at the various film festivals that it was screened at. It premiered at the 2003 B-Movie Film Festival and won four B-Movie awards including Best B-Movie, Best Director (Barak Epstein), Best Movie Actress (Rhonda Shear), and Best Set Design (Heather Mason). The film won the 2003 Deep Ellum Award for Best Feature at the Deep Ellum Film Festival. At the 2004 Backseat Film Festival, Prison-A-Go-Go! took home the prize for Best Feature. Then at the 2004 Twisted Sinema Underground Festival, Prison-A-Go-Go! was given the award for Best Comedy.
