= List of United States Supreme Court cases, volume 99 =

Supreme Court of the United States
- Interactive map of Supreme Court of the United States
- 38°53′26″N 77°00′16″W
- Established: March 4, 1789; 236 years ago
- Location: Washington, D.C.
- Coordinates: 38°53′26″N 77°00′16″W
- Composition method: Presidential nomination with Senate confirmation
- Authorised by: Constitution of the United States, Art. III, § 1
- Judge term length: life tenure, subject to impeachment and removal
- Number of positions: 9 (by statute)
- Website: supremecourt.gov

This is a list of cases reported in volume 99 of United States Reports, decided by the Supreme Court of the United States in 1879.

== Justices of the Supreme Court at the time of 99 U.S. ==
The Supreme Court is established by Article III, Section 1 of the Constitution of the United States, which says: "The judicial Power of the United States, shall be vested in one supreme Court . . .". The size of the Court is not specified; the Constitution leaves it to Congress to set the number of justices. Under the Judiciary Act of 1789 Congress originally fixed the number of justices at six (one chief justice and five associate justices). Since 1789 Congress has varied the size of the Court from six to seven, nine, ten, and back to nine justices (always including one chief justice).

When the cases in 99 U.S. were decided the Court comprised the following nine members:

Portrait	Justice	Office	Home State	Succeeded	Date confirmed by the Senate (Vote)	Tenure on Supreme Court
	Morrison Waite	Chief Justice	Ohio	Salmon P. Chase	January 21, 1874 (63–0)	March 4, 1874 – March 23, 1888 (Died)
	Nathan Clifford	Associate Justice	Maine	Benjamin Robbins Curtis	January 12, 1858 (26–23)	January 21, 1858 – July 25, 1881 (Died)
	Noah Haynes Swayne	Associate Justice	Ohio	John McLean	January 24, 1862 (38–1)	January 27, 1862 – January 24, 1881 (Retired)
	Samuel Freeman Miller	Associate Justice	Iowa	Peter Vivian Daniel	July 16, 1862 (Acclamation)	July 21, 1862 – October 13, 1890 (Died)
	Stephen Johnson Field	Associate Justice	California	newly created seat	March 10, 1863 (Acclamation)	May 10, 1863 – December 1, 1897 (Retired)
	William Strong	Associate Justice	Pennsylvania	Robert Cooper Grier	February 18, 1870 (No vote recorded)	March 14, 1870 – December 14, 1880 (Retired)
	Joseph P. Bradley	Associate Justice	New Jersey	newly created seat	March 21, 1870 (46–9)	March 23, 1870 – January 22, 1892 (Died)
	Ward Hunt	Associate Justice	New York	Samuel Nelson	December 11, 1872 (Acclamation)	January 9, 1873 – January 27, 1882 (Retired)
	John Marshall Harlan	Associate Justice	Kentucky	David Davis	November 29, 1877 (Acclamation)	December 10, 1877 – October 14, 1911 (Died)

== Citation style ==
Under the Judiciary Act of 1789 the federal court structure at the time comprised District Courts, which had general trial jurisdiction; Circuit Courts, which had mixed trial and appellate (from the US District Courts) jurisdiction; and the United States Supreme Court, which had appellate jurisdiction over the federal District and Circuit courts—and for certain issues over state courts. The Supreme Court also had limited original jurisdiction (i.e., in which cases could be filed directly with the Supreme Court without first having been heard by a lower federal or state court). There were one or more federal District Courts and/or Circuit Courts in each state, territory, or other geographical region.

Bluebook citation style is used for case names, citations, and jurisdictions.

- "C.C.D." = United States Circuit Court for the District of . . .
  - e.g.,"C.C.D.N.J." = United States Circuit Court for the District of New Jersey
- "D." = United States District Court for the District of . . .
  - e.g.,"D. Mass." = United States District Court for the District of Massachusetts
- "E." = Eastern; "M." = Middle; "N." = Northern; "S." = Southern; "W." = Western
  - e.g.,"C.C.S.D.N.Y." = United States Circuit Court for the Southern District of New York
  - e.g.,"M.D. Ala." = United States District Court for the Middle District of Alabama
- "Ct. Cl." = United States Court of Claims
- The abbreviation of a state's name alone indicates the highest appellate court in that state's judiciary at the time.
  - e.g.,"Pa." = Supreme Court of Pennsylvania
  - e.g.,"Me." = Supreme Judicial Court of Maine

== List of cases in 99 U.S. ==
Case Name	Page and year	Opinion of the Court	Concurring opinion(s)	Dissenting opinion(s)	Lower Court	Disposition
Wolf v. Stix	1 (1879)	Waite	none	none	C.C.W.D. Tenn.	multiple
United States v. Farden	10 (1879)	Clifford	none	none	Ct. Cl.	affirmed
Hussey v. Smith	20 (1879)	Swayne	none	none	Sup. Ct. Terr. Utah	reversed
Mills v. Scott	25 (1879)	Field	none	none	C.C.S.D. Ga.	new trial
Quinn v. United States	30 (1879)	Miller	none	none	Ct. Cl.	reversed
United States v. Ames	35 (1879)	Clifford	none	none	C.C.D. Mass.	affirmed
Platt v. Union Pacific Railroad Company	48 (1879)	Strong	none	Bradley	C.C.D. Neb.	affirmed
Lange v. Benedict	68 (1879)	Waite	none	none	N.Y.	dismissed
Doggett v. Florida Railroad Company	72 (1879)	Swayne	none	none	C.C.N.D. Fla.	affirmed
Eastern Transportation Line v. Cooper	78 (1879)	Waite	none	none	N.Y. Sup. Ct.	affirmed
Barrow v. Hunton	80 (1879)	Bradley	none	none	C.C.D. La.	reversed
Hackett v. Ottawa	86 (1879)	Harlan	none	none	C.C.N.D. Ill.	reversed
New Orleans Canal and Banking Company v. City of New Orleans	97 (1879)	Bradley	none	none	La.	affirmed
Grafton v. Cummings	100 (1879)	Miller	none	none	C.C.S.D.N.Y.	reversed
Town of Weyauwega v. Ayling	112 (1879)	Waite	none	none	C.C.E.D. Wis.	affirmed
Case v. Beauregard	119 (1879)	Strong	none	none	C.C.D. La.	affirmed
Wilkerson v. Utah	130 (1879)	Clifford	none	none	Sup. Ct. Terr. Utah	affirmed
Burbank v. Semmes	138 (1879)	Clifford	none	none	La.	affirmed
Biebinger v. Continental Bank	143 (1879)	Miller	none	none	C.C.E.D. Mo.	reversed
Railroad Company v. McKinley	147 (1879)	Waite	none	none	Iowa	affirmed
Klein v. City of New Orleans	149 (1879)	Waite	none	none	C.C.D. La.	affirmed
United States v. City of Ft. Scott	152 (1879)	Harlan	none	none	C.C.D. Kan.	reversed
Harris v. McGovern	161 (1879)	Clifford	none	none	C.C.D. Cal.	affirmed
Gordon v. Gilfoil	168 (1879)	Bradley	none	none	C.C.D. La.	reversed
Burt v. Panjaud	180 (1879)	Miller	Field	Strong	C.C.N.D. Ill.	affirmed
Atwood v. Weems	183 (1879)	Miller	Field	none	C.C.N.D. Fla.	affirmed
Ketchum v. Buckley	188 (1879)	Waite	none	none	Ala.	affirmed
Southern Express Company v. Western North Carolina Railroad Company	191 (1879)	Swayne	none	none	C.C.W.D.N.C.	affirmed
Godden v. Kimmell	201 (1879)	Clifford	none	none	Sup. Ct. D.C.	affirmed
Vansant v. Electro-Magnetic Gas Light Company	213 (1879)	Waite	none	none	Sup. Ct. D.C.	dismissed
Calhoun County v. Galbraith	214 (1879)	Swayne	none	none	D. Miss.	affirmed
Farrell v. United States	221 (1879)	Strong	none	none	C.C.N.D. Ill.	affirmed
United States v. Glab	225 (1879)	Clifford	none	none	C.C.D. Iowa	affirmed
King v. United States	229 (1879)	Miller	none	none	C.C.N.D. Ohio	multiple
Fosdick v. Schall	235 (1879)	Waite	none	none	C.C.N.D. Ill.	multiple
Fosdick v. Southwestern Car Company	256 (1879)	Waite	none	none	C.C.N.D. Ill.	affirmed
Huidekoper v. Hinkley Locomotive Works	258 (1879)	Waite	none	none	C.C.N.D. Ill.	reversed
Campbell v. Rankin	261 (1879)	Miller	none	none	Sup. Ct. Terr. Mont.	reversed
United States v. Pugh	265 (1879)	Waite	none	none	Ct. Cl.	affirmed
Wheeling, Parkersburg, and Cincinnati Transportation Company v. City of Wheeling	273 (1879)	Clifford	none	none	W. Va.	affirmed
Tice v. United States	286 (1879)	Harlan	none	none	Ct. Cl.	affirmed
Myrick v. Thompson	291 (1879)	Clifford	none	none	Minn.	affirmed
Phelps v. McDonald	298 (1879)	Swayne	none	Miller	Sup. Ct. D.C.	reversed
Northwestern University v. Illinois	309 (1879)	Miller	none	none	Ill.	reversed
Bank v. Partee	325 (1879)	Field	none	Miller	C.C.S.D. Miss.	reversed
Sage v. Central Railroad Company	334 (1879)	Strong	none	none	C.C.D. Iowa	affirmed
Hoge v. Richmond and Danville Railroad Company	348 (1879)	Field	none	none	C.C.D.S.C.	reversed
Denver v. Roane	355 (1879)	Strong	none	none	Sup. Ct. D.C.	reversed
Town of Brooklyn v. Aetna Life Insurance Company	362 (1879)	Harlan	none	none	C.C.N.D. Ill.	affirmed
United States v. Winchester	372 (1879)	Field	none	none	Ct. Cl.	affirmed
Van Norden v. Morton	378 (1879)	Miller	none	none	C.C.D. La.	reversed
Ryan v. Central Pacific Railroad Company	382 (1879)	Swayne	Harlan	none	C.C.D. Cal.	affirmed
Hale v. Frost	389 (1879)	Waite	none	none	C.C.D. Iowa	reversed
Hartman v. Bean	393 (1879)	Clifford	none	none	C.C.E.D. Wis.	affirmed
Smith v. Fort Scott and Allen County Railroad Company	398 (1879)	Swayne	none	none	C.C.D. Kan.	affirmed
Union Pacific Railroad Company v. United States	402 (1879)	Bradley	none	Strong	Ct. Cl.	reversed
Parsons v. Jackson	434 (1879)	Bradley	none	none	C.C.D. La.	affirmed
Keely v. Sanders	441 (1879)	Strong	none	none	Tenn.	reversed
United States v. Central Pacific Railroad Company	449 (1879)	Bradley	none	none	C.C.D. Cal.	reversed
United States v. Kansas Pacific Railway Company	455 (1879)	Bradley	none	none	C.C.D. Kan.	reversed
United States v. Denver Pacific Railway and Telegraph Company	460 (1879)	Bradley	none	none	Ct. Cl.	affirmed
Denver and Rio Grande Western Railroad Company v. Alling	463 (1879)	Harlan	none	Waite	C.C.D. Colo.	reversed
Montgomery v. Samory	482 (1879)	Clifford	none	none	C.C.D. La.	affirmed
United States v. Sioux City and Pacific Railroad Company	491 (1879)	Bradley	none	none	C.C.D. Iowa	affirmed
Clark v. United States	493 (1879)	Swayne	none	none	Ct. Cl.	affirmed
Sherry v. McKinley	496 (1879)	Strong	none	none	Tenn.	reversed
Wilson v. Salamanca	499 (1879)	Waite	none	none	C.C.D. Kan.	reversed
Grigsby v. Purcell	505 (1879)	Waite	none	none	C.C.D. Ky.	affirmed
United States v. Germaine	508 (1879)	Miller	none	none	C.C.D. Me.	certification
Jackson v. Vicksburg, Shreveport and Pacific Railway Company	513 (1879)	Bradley	none	Field	C.C.D. La.	reversed
Yulee v. Vose	539 (1879)	Waite	none	none	N.Y.	reversed
Hartell v. Tilghman	547 (1879)	Miller	none	Bradley	C.C.E.D. Pa.	reversed
Colby v. Reed	560 (1879)	Clifford	none	none	C.C.E.D. Wis.	affirmed
McBurney v. Carson	567 (1879)	Swayne	none	none	C.C.D.S.C.	affirmed
Elliott v. East Pacific Railroad Company	573 (1879)	Waite	none	none	C.C.E.D. Pa.	affirmed
Pence v. Langdon	578 (1879)	Swayne	none	none	C.C.D. Minn.	affirmed
United States v. Macon County	582 (1879)	Waite	none	none	C.C.W.D. Mo.	affirmed
Terhune v. Phillips	592 (1879)	Swayne	none	none	C.C.N.D. Ill.	affirmed
Alvord v. United States	593 (1879)	Waite	none	none	Sup. Ct. Terr. Idaho	reinstatement denied
Whiskey Cases	594 (1879)	Clifford	none	none	C.C.N.D. Ill.	reversed
Whitney v. Cook	607 (1879)	Waite	none	none	C.C.S.D. Miss.	affirmance denied
National Bank v. Bank of Commerce	608 (1879)	Waite	none	none	C.C.E.D. Mo.	amendment granted
Stringfellow v. Cain	610 (1879)	Waite	none	none	Sup. Ct. Terr. Utah	reversed
Cannon v. Pratt	619 (1879)	Waite	none	none	Sup. Ct. Terr. Utah	affirmed
Leavenworth County v. Sellew	624 (1879)	Waite	none	none	C.C.D. Kan.	affirmed
Crescent City National Bank of New Orleans v. Case	628 (1879)	Strong	none	none	C.C.D. La.	affirmed
Northern Transportation Company of Ohio v. City of Chicago	635 (1879)	Strong	none	none	C.C.N.D. Ill.	affirmed
Congress and Empire Spring Company v. Edgar	645 (1879)	Clifford	none	none	C.C.N.D.N.Y.	affirmed
City of Evanston v. Gunn	660 (1879)	Strong	none	none	C.C.N.D. Ill.	affirmed
Lyon v. Pollock	668 (1879)	Field	none	none	C.C.W.D. Tex.	affirmed
Perris v. Hexamer	674 (1879)	Waite	none	none	C.C.E.D. Pa.	affirmed
Town of Orleans v. Platt	676 (1879)	Swayne	none	none	C.C.N.D.N.Y.	affirmed
Lyons v. Munson	684 (1879)	Swayne	none	none	C.C.N.D.N.Y.	affirmed
Block v. Bourbon County	686 (1879)	Strong	none	none	C.C.D. Kan.	affirmed
Sinking-Fund Cases	700 (1879)	Waite	none	Strong; Bradley; Field	Ct. Cl.	affirmed
