= Section 52 of the Constitution of Australia =

Section 52 of the Constitution of Australia enumerates the exclusive powers granted to the Parliament of Australia by the Australian States at Federation. In contrast to Section 51, the powers granted under Section 52 are only vested in the Commonwealth parliament, to the exclusion of state parliaments.

Section 52 enumerates three categories of exclusive powers, relating to the governance of certain federally owned properties, the regulation of the specific state government agencies, and powers over "other matters" described elsewhere in the constitution.

== Text ==
Section 52 The Parliament shall, subject to this Constitution, have exclusive power to make laws for the peace, order, and good government of the Commonwealth with respect to:

(i) the seat of government of the Commonwealth, and all places acquired by the Commonwealth for public purposes;
(ii) matters relating to any department of the public service the control of which is by this Constitution transferred to the Executive Government of the Commonwealth;
(iii) other matters declared by this Constitution to be within the exclusive power of the Parliament

== Interpretation ==
=== Governance of certain properties ===
The power to exclusively govern certain properties, including those obtained under Section 51(xxxi), is vested with the commonwealth parliament. Certain state laws predating the acquisition remain in place, with jurisprudence similar to the federal enclave clause in the US constitution. For example, Australian courts have held that laws related to indecent conduct and workplace safety are inapplicable on military bases.

Parliament's Section 52 powers over acquired property are distinct from its Section 122 powers over territories.

=== Transferred agencies ===
Under Section 69, certain state government functions, such as the provision of a postal service, were transferred to the commonwealth government. For such functions, the commonwealth parliament can legislate without regard to state parliaments.

For transferred departments, Section 52(ii) provides a basis for the employment of ministerial advisers.

The verbiage of Section 52(ii) has been argued to impact the interpretation of any potential future changes to constitutional arrangements, such as the establishment of an Indigenous Voice.
