= Gito (name) =

Gito is a given name and a surname. Notable people with the name include:

== Given name ==
- Gito Baloi (1964–2004), Mozambican musician

== Surname ==
- Gener Gito (born 1971), Filipino associate justice of the Sandiganbayan

== See also ==
- Gito (disambiguation)
