= To the Confusion of Our Enemies =

Studio album by Riverboat Gamblers
- Released: April 25, 2006
- Genre: Punk rock
- Length: 34:38
- Label: Volcom Entertainment; No Idea

Riverboat Gamblers chronology
Backsides (2004)	To the Confusion of Our Enemies (2006)	Underneath the Owl (2009)

Professional ratings
Review scores
Source	Rating
AllMusic	4/5 stars

To the Confusion of Our Enemies is an album by American punk band the Riverboat Gamblers. It was released in 2006 on Volcom Entertainment.

== Track list ==
No.	Title	Length
1.	"True Crime"	2:36
2.	"Don't Bury Me...I'm Still Not Dead"	2:46
3.	"Biz Loves Sluts"	2:26
4.	"The Song We Used to Call "Wasting Time""	1:58
5.	"On Again Off Again"	3:14
6.	"The Gamblers Try Their Hand at International Diplomacy"	1:45
7.	"Walk Around Me"	2:23
8.	"Unicorn Shave Your Horn"	0:34
9.	"The Art of Getting Fucked"	2:04
10.	"Year of the Rooster"	3:14
11.	"The Curse of the Ivory Coast"	3:12
12.	"Rent is Due"	2:19
13.	"Uh Oh!"	2:30
14.	"Black Nothing of a Cat"	3:37
15.	"No Fair (vinyl-only bonus track)"
