= United States v. Hartwell =

- Supreme Court of the United States

Decided December 1, 1867
- Full case name: United States v. Hartwell
- Citations: 73 U.S. 385 (more)

Holding
- An Officer of the United States, as opposed to a mere employee, has a tenure, duration, emolument, and duties defined by law rather than by contract.

Court membership
- Chief Justice Salmon P. Chase Associate Justices Samuel Nelson · Robert C. Grier; Nathan Clifford · Noah H. Swayne; Samuel F. Miller · David Davis; Stephen J. Field

Case opinions
- Majority: Swayne, joined by Chase, Nelson, Clifford, Davis
- Dissent: Miller, joined by Grier, Field

Laws applied
- U.S. Const. art. II, § 2, cl. 2

United States v. Hartwell, 73 U.S. 385 (1867), was a decision of the United States Supreme Court which defined the characteristics of an "Officer of the United States" as written in the Constitution, and also the scope of two federal embezzlement statutes. The Court held that an Officer, as opposed to a mere government employee, has a tenure, duration, emolument, and duties defined by law as opposed to by contract.

== Background ==
The case came to the Supreme Court upon a certificate of division from the United States Circuit Court for the District of Massachusetts. Hartwell, a clerk in the office of the Assistant Treasurer of the United States at Boston, was indicted on ten counts for embezzlement. Three counts were brought under the Independent Treasury Act of 1846, while seven counts were brought under an 1866 embezzlement law. (Note: An Act to regulate and secure the Safe-Keeping of public Money intrusted to Disbursing Officers of the United States (1866)) The indictment alleged that the clerkship was created and filled under the 1866 general appropriations bill, which authorized the Assistant Treasurer, with the approbation of the Secretary of the Treasury, to appoint a clerk at a stated salary.

The certificate presented two questions:

1. Whether Hartwell was liable to indictment under 1846 Act; and
2. Whether the last seven counts stated any offense under 1866 Act within the court’s jurisdiction.

== Decision ==
Justice Swayne delivered the opinion of the Court. Addressing the first question, the Court concluded that Hartwell was a public officer and also a person “charged with the safe-keeping of the public money” within the meaning of the 1846 Act. The Court stated: “An office is a public station, or employment, conferred by the appointment of government. The term embraces the ideas of tenure, duration, emolument, and duties.” Because the clerk was appointed pursuant to law, paid a statutory salary, and had continuing, permanent duties as prescribed by his superior, he occupied an office. The Court further read 1846 Act to cover subordinate officers who, by statute, are required to keep safely public money placed in their possession. The first certified question was therefore answered in the affirmative.

On the second question, the Court examined the 1866 Act and held that its concluding penal clause was limited to “any president, cashier, teller, director, or other officer of any bank or banking association” who violated the Act’s terms. Because the indictment described Hartwell only as a clerk in the Assistant Treasurer’s office, the statute did not apply and the court had no jurisdiction over those counts. The second certified question was therefore answered in the negative.

=== Dissent ===
Justice Miller, joined by Justices Grier and Field, dissented from the Court’s answer to the first certified question. Miller argued that the 1846 Independent Treasury Act reached "only those officers and other persons” whom Congress itself "charged by law" with the safe-keeping, transfer, or disbursement of public money, and not subordinate clerks whose duties derive solely from an assistant treasurer’s discretionary assignments. Reviewing the Act’s structure, he emphasized that Congress expressly imposed custodial duties on named officers (including the Treasurer, assistant treasurers, collectors, receivers, and postmasters) and required bonds from those legal custodians, but did not impose comparable statutory duties on clerks in assistant treasurers’ offices, and read the phrase “all public officers of whatever character” to cover other statutory custodians of public money (such as marshals or paymasters), not subordinate employees who might incidentally handle funds by their superior’s leave. He also noted that several evidentiary and accounting provisions presuppose legal custodians who keep official accounts with the government, which clerks do not. On that reading, Hartwell would not have been liable to indictment under the Independent Treasury Act.

== Significance ==
Hartwell is not notable for its technical deliberations over Hartwell's liability under the 1846 and 1866 acts, but rather for its articulation and establishment of the definition of the core attributes of an "Officer of the United States" and an "office" under constitutional precedent. The definition of "officer" is key to the Appointments Clause, and Hartwell's “tenure, duration, emolument, and duties” formulation is often referred to in Appointments Clause discussions.

Despite penning the dissent in this case based on the laws' technical merits, Miller would go on to author the Court's unanimous decision in United States v. Germaine, in which he and the Court upheld Hartwell's definition of "officer".
