= Assimilative Crimes Act =

The Assimilative Crimes Act, 18 U.S.C. § 13, makes state law applicable to conduct occurring on lands reserved or acquired by the federal government as provided in 18 U.S.C. § 7(3), when the act or omission is not made punishable by an enactment of Congress.

== History ==
The first Assimilative Crimes Act was passed as § 3 of the Crimes Act of 1825.

== Purpose and interpretation ==
Prosecutions instituted under this statute are not to enforce the laws of the state, but to enforce federal law, the details of which, instead of being recited, are adopted by reference. In addition to minor violations, the statute has been invoked to cover a number of serious criminal offenses defined by state law such as burglary and embezzlement. However, the Assimilative Crimes Act cannot be used to override other federal policies as expressed by acts of Congress or by valid administrative orders.

The prospective incorporation of state law was upheld in United States v. Sharpnack, 355 U.S. 286 (1957). State law is assimilated only when no "enactment of Congress" covers the conduct. The application of this rule is not always easy. In Williams v. United States, 327 U.S. 711, 717 (1946), prosecution of a sex offense under a state statute with a higher age of consent was held impermissible, but a conviction for a shooting with intent to kill as defined by state law was upheld, despite the similarity of provisions of 18 U.S.C. § 113. There seems to be a definite trend to construe 18 U.S.C. § 13 liberally to provide complete coverage of criminal conduct within a federal enclave, even where the offense is generally covered by federal law.

== Relation to military law ==
The Uniform Code of Military Justice (U.C.M.J.), 10 U.S.C. § 801 et seq., because of its unlimited applicability, is not considered an "enactment of Congress" within the meaning of 18 U.S.C. § 13. Military personnel committing acts on an enclave subject to federal jurisdiction which are not made an offense by federal statutes other than the U.C.M.J. may therefore be prosecuted in district court for violations of state law assimilated by 18 U.S.C. § 13, even though they are also subject to court martial. Dual prosecution is constitutionally precluded by the Double Jeopardy Clause.

== Relation to administrative law ==
18 U.S.C. § 13 does not assimilate penal provisions of state regulatory schemes. Nor does it incorporate state administrative penalties, such as suspension of driver's licenses. Section 13(b) allows suspension of licenses within the enclave.

Federal agency regulations, violations of which are made criminal by statute, have been held to preclude assimilation of state law. In United States v. Adams, 502 F. Supp. 21, the defendant was charged with carrying a concealed weapon in a United States Courthouse in violation of 18 U.S.C. § 13 and the pertinent Florida felony firearms statute. In dismissing the indictment, the Adams court concluded that a General Services Administration (GSA) petty offense weapons regulation, which had explicitly provided for by statute, amounted to an enactment of Congress within the meaning of 18 U.S.C. § 13 and, therefore, the defendant could not be prosecuted by the assimilation of state law which prohibited the same precise act.

A critical provision of the GSA regulations apparently was not considered in Adams. The regulation at the time of the case provides in part: "Nothing in these rules and regulations shall be construed to abrogate any other federal laws or regulations or any State and local laws and regulations applicable to any area in which the property is situated."

This non-abrogation provision arguably would permit the assimilation of appropriate state firearms laws or other state statutes notwithstanding the existence of the GSA regulations. It appears that this language has never been considered in any reported case. Moreover, no discussion of the meaning of this language appears in the pertinent parts of the Federal Register. The United States Department of Justice believe it would be reasonable to interpret this non-abrogation provision as permitting the government, in its discretion, to proceed under 18 U.S.C. § 13 and appropriate state firearms laws, rather than under the GSA weapons regulation.
