= United States v. Germaine =

- Supreme Court of the United States

Decided October 1, 1878
- Full case name: United States v. Germaine
- Citations: 99 U.S. 508 (more)

Holding
- While an inferior officer may be appointed a Department Head, only a principal officer may be a Department Head.

Court membership
- Chief Justice Morrison Waite Associate Justices Nathan Clifford · Noah H. Swayne; Samuel F. Miller · Stephen J. Field; William Strong · Joseph P. Bradley; Ward Hunt · John M. Harlan

Case opinion
- Majority: Miller, joined by unanimous

Laws applied
- U.S. Const. art. II, § 2, cl. 2

United States v. Germaine, 99 U.S. 508 (1879), was a decision of the United States Supreme Court concerning who qualifies as an “Officer of the United States” for purposes of the Appointments Clause and a federal criminal statute prohibiting extortion by federal "officers". The Court held that a civil surgeon appointed by the Commissioner of Pensions to examine pensioners was not an “officer of the United States,” and the Commissioner of Pensions was not the “head of a department” within the meaning of the clause.

== Background ==
Article II of the United States Constitution requires that officers of the United States, nominated by the President, are confirmed with the advice and consent of the Senate. Anticipating that the procedure might become unwieldy "when offices become numerous, and sudden removals necessary", the Constitution provided a guideline for the appointment of inferior officers, who could be appointed by the President alone, or by heads of departments, or courts of law.

The Commissioner of Pensions appointed Germaine to act as a civil surgeon to perform examinations of pensioners and applicants for pensions. For each examination and certificate, a $2 fee was provided, payable from appropriations for pension payments and under regulations prescribed by the Commissioner. The Germaine was indicted in the District of Maine for “extortion under color of office” under the Crimes Act of 1825, which punished “every officer of the United States” guilty of extortion. The indictment was remitted to the Circuit Court, whose judges divided on whether Germaine was an “officer of the United States” and whether judgment on demurrer should be for the United States or for Germaine.

== Supreme Court ==
On a certificate of division from the Circuit Court for the District of Maine, the Supreme Court considered whether the defendant’s appointment made him an “officer of the United States” within the Crimes Act of 1825 and, relatedly, whether the Commissioner of Pensions was a constitutionally recognized “head of a department” such that appointments made by him would satisfy the Appointments Clause for inferior officers.

Counsel relied on Article II, Section 2, Clause 2, which provides for presidential nomination and Senate confirmation of principal officers and permits Congress to vest the appointment of inferior officers “in the President alone, in the courts of law, or in the heads of departments.” The Court also discussed its earlier decision in United States v. Hartwell, which had described an “office” as embracing “tenure, duration, emolument, and duties.”

== Decision ==
Justice Miller delivered the opinion of the Court. First, the Court concluded that the term “heads of departments” in the Appointments Clause refers to the principal officers who lead the Cabinet-level executive departments (e.g., State, Treasury, War, Interior, Justice), not to bureau chiefs, commissioners, or auditors within those departments. Accordingly, the Commissioner of Pensions was not a “head of a department.”

Second, applying the Hartwell understanding of “office,” the Court held Germaine was not an “officer of the United States.” His duties as a civil surgeon were “occasional and intermittent,” performed only when called upon in specific cases; he maintained no public office, gave no bond, took no oath, and was paid a per-certificate fee from pension funds rather than a regularly appropriated salary. He was “but an agent of the commissioner, appointed by him, and removable by him at his pleasure,” and thus fell outside the extortion statute limited to “officers of the United States.” Judgment on the demurrer was directed for Germaine.

== Significance ==
Germaine clarified that:

- The term "officer" for the purposes of interpreting Article II "embraces the ideas of tenure, duration, emolument, and duties"
- Individuals with occasional, intermittent duties, paid per task and lacking the attributes of an office identified in Hartwell, are employees rather than “officers.”

The decision focused on whether the official exercised continuing duties, rather than whether those duties were significant, discretionary, or involved final decision-making authority.

== Subsequent developments ==
Some decisions of the United States Court of Appeals for the District of Columbia Circuit have interpreted the constitutional definition of an officer to require authority to issue final decisions, departing from the longstanding definition applied since Germaine.

Later cases, such as Lucia v. SEC (2018) have cited Germaine for the proposition that an “officer” occupies a continuing position established by law.
