= Perris v. Hexamer =

- Supreme Court of the United States

Argued December 17–18, 1878 Decided February 3, 1879
- Full case name: Perris v. Hexamer
- Citations: 99 U.S. 674 (more) 25 L. Ed. 308

Holding
- A map-maker has no more an exclusive right to use the form of the characters they employ to express their ideas on a map than they have to use the typeface they use for text.

Court membership
- Chief Justice Morrison Waite Associate Justices Nathan Clifford · Noah H. Swayne; Samuel F. Miller · Stephen J. Field; William Strong · Joseph P. Bradley; Ward Hunt · John M. Harlan

Case opinion
- Majority: Waite

Perris v. Hexamer, 99 U.S. 674 (1879), was a United States Supreme Court case in which the Court held a map-maker has no more an exclusive right to use the form of the characters they employ to express their ideas on a map than they have to use the typeface they use for text. Suitably, one could not use copyright to restrict the use of map symbols.
