= Sugoi Indeed =

Studio album by Electric Eel Shock
- Released: 12 October 2009
- Genre: Garage rock, heavy metal
- Length: 38:40
- Label: Sellaband
- Producer: Attie Bauw

Electric Eel Shock chronology
Transworld Ultra Rock (2007)	Sugoi Indeed (2009)	Sweet Generation (2017)

Professional ratings
Review scores
Source	Rating
Classic Rock	7/10 stars
The Skinny	2/5 stars

Sugoi Indeed is the eight studio album from Japanese garage metal trio Electric Eel Shock, released 2009.

== Track listing ==
All tracks are written by Electric Eel Shock

No.	Title	Length
1.	"Metal Man"	4:42
2.	"Out of Control"	2:54
3.	"Mr Toad"	3:43
4.	"Sugoi Indeed"	2:57
5.	"Death Penalty"	3:36
6.	"Nobody Knows"	2:57
7.	"More"	3:06
8.	"No Shit Sherlock"	2:04
9.	"M.T.B"	2:26
10.	"Goodbye Peach"	4:20
11.	"Gimme Your Love"	2:33
12.	"Sugoi Indeed (japanese version)"	2:57
Total length:		38:40
