= Transworld Ultra Rock =

Studio album by Electric Eel Shock
- Released: October 1, 2007
- Recorded: 2007
- Genre: Garage rock Rock and roll Heavy metal
- Length: 40:56 (excluding bonus tracks)
- Label: Double Peace; P-Vine
- Producer: Attie Bauw

Electric Eel Shock chronology
Beat Me (2005)	Transworld Ultra Rock (2007)	Sugoi Indeed (2009)

Professional ratings
Review scores
Source	Rating
rocklouder.co.uk	link

Transworld Ultra Rock is the seventh album of Japanese band Electric Eel Shock and was released in 2007. The Album was produced, engineered, mixed, and mastered by Attie Bauw. The album was recorded at Bauwhaus Studios, Amsterdam, The Netherlands. The Drums were recorded at The Tracking Room, Amsterdam, The Netherlands. Additional vocal arrangement and production on track 12 by David Laudat.

The name of this album is based upon the name of the hit 1970s Japanese television show Transamerica Ultra Quiz.

The songs "Joe" and "Joe II" were inspired by the 1970s Anime/Manga Tomorrow's Joe's main character.

== Track listing ==
All tracks are written by Electric Eel Shock, except track 12 written by Riperton/Rudolph.

No.	Title	Length
1.	"I Can't Hear You"	3:11
2.	"Big Mistake"	3:02
3.	"Dice de Try!"	3:05
4.	"Joe"	3:45
5.	"Joe II"	2:36
6.	"Kill the Weekend"	3:50
7.	"War"	3:26
8.	"Transamerica Ultra Rock"	2:25
9.	"Limousine"	2:30
10.	"Baby"	3:11
11.	"All My Music"	5:15
12.	"Lovin' You"	4:37
13.	"Bastard (Bonus Track)"	2:30
14.	"No Standing Still (Bonus Track)"	3:09

Tracks 13 and 14 are bonus tracks that only appear on the Japanese version of this album released by P-Vine Records. The bonus track "Bastard" was bastardised by Timmy B.

== Release history ==
Region	Date	Label	Format	Catalog
United Kingdom	October 1, 2007	Double Peace	Stereo Compact Disc	?
United Kingdom	October 1, 2007	Double Peace	Stereo LP	?
Japan	November 16, 2007	P-Vine	Stereo Compact Disc	PCD-24198

== Personnel ==
- Akihito Morimoto – Guitar/Vocals
- Kazuto Maekawa – Bass
- Tomoharu "Gian" Ito – Drums
- The Bauwhaus Whistle Orchestra – Whistling on track 8 (Wayne Charlton credited as Lead Whistler)
- Jolien Grunberg – Additional vocals on track 12.
- Bob Slayer – Manager.
