= The Riverboat Gamblers =

American punk rock band

Riverboat Gamblers
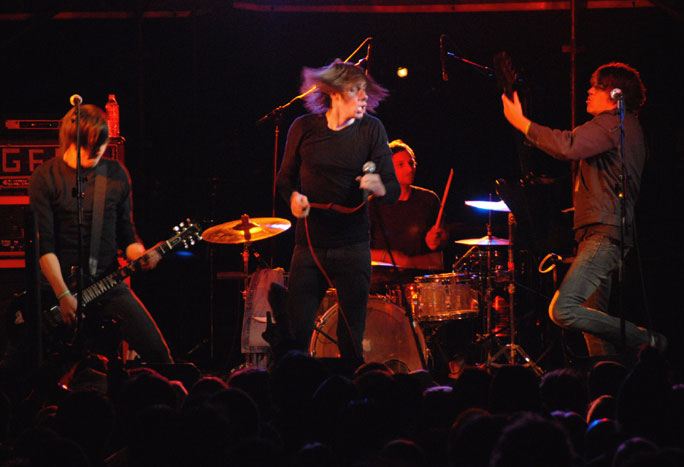

Background information
- Origin: Denton, Texas, U.S.
- Genres: Punk rock, garage rock, alternative rock
- Years active: 1997–present
- Labels: Beatville, Gearhead, Volcom Entertainment, End Sounds
- Members: Fadi El-Assad; Mike Wiebe; Ian MacDougall; Rob Marchant; Sam Keir
- Past members: Patrick Lillard; Jeremy Diaz; Clayton Mills; Chris Adams; Colin Jones; Francisco Job; Jesse Hamilton; Mark Baker; Luke Abbey; Mark Ryan; Shawn Prunty; Eric Green; Ian Walling
- Website: www.theriverboatgamblers.com

Riverboat Gamblers is an American punk rock band originally from Denton, Texas, formed in 1997, now residing in Austin, Texas. The band's current line-up comprises vocalist Mike Wiebe, guitarist/voc Fadi El-Assad, guitarist/voc Ian MacDougall, bassist Rob Marchant, and drummer Sam Keir.

== History ==
=== Formation and early years (1997–2000) ===
In 1997, Fadi El-Assad ("Freddy Castro") (lead guitar) and Patrick Lillard ("Spider Stewart") (bass) formed The Riverboat Gamblers with Mike Wiebe ("Rookie Sensation") (vocals). Lillard's original intention was to emulate Virginia rockers The Candy Snatchers in direct contrast to the popular emo music at the time. Riverboat Gamblers got their start playing house shows throughout Denton and the Dallas/Fort Worth area.

=== Breakthrough and first releases (2001–2004) ===
With guitarist Fadi El-Assad writing the bulk of the music and vocalist Mike Wiebe in charge of lyrics, The Gamblers released their debut self-titled album in September 2001 on Vile Beat Records with it being produced by Texas punk rocker Tim Kerr (Big Boys, Lord High Fixers). They burst out of the Denton college scene at the same time on the back of their self-released 7" single "Jenna (Is A No Show)." The band first received attention from major record labels after their energetic and rowdy showcase at the 2003 South by Southwest (SXSW) music festival in Austin, Texas, but the band ultimately signed with indie label Gearhead Records. Through this label, The Gamblers released 2003's Something to Crow About in June, which was also produced by Tim Kerr. A music video for the track "What's What" was made from the album. After the warm reception of their sophomore record and a well received European tour, they relocated from Denton, Texas to Austin, Texas.

Their third album Backsides was released in September 2004 through Beatville and Vile Beat Records. The reason for their departure from Gearhead Records was due to a heavy touring schedule.

=== Label change and success (2005–2008) ===
The Riverboat Gamblers toured with Flogging Molly in early 2005. In April 2005, the band were signed to Volcom Entertainment and performed on Warped Tour 2005. The band then went on tour with Rollins Band and X in the summer of 2006. They also toured with Dead To Me and Joan Jett in the fall of the same year.

The band's fourth and most successful album, To the Confusion of Our Enemies, was released in April 2006 on Volcom Entertainment. Luke Abbey of Gorilla Biscuits formally joined the band in February 2007 after helping with the live shows for a few weeks prior.

=== Underneath the Owl and MacDougall's bike accident (2009–2010) ===
Underneath the Owl, the Riverboat Gamblers' fifth studio album, was released on March 10, 2009. In June 2009, the band covered Prince's "Let's Go Crazy" for SPIN's Purple Rain tribute album titled "Purplish Rain." They supported Rise Against alongside Rancid on the Appeal To Reason Tour the following summer.

On the night of October 17, 2009, MacDougall was hit by a truck while biking home. He sustained severe injuries but recovered in time for the band to make an appearance on the Warped Tour 2010.

In March 2010, the music video for the single "Robots May Break Your Heart" was released. In June, the band hosted a remix contest for the former single, recorded four tracks for a Daytrotter session available as a free download, and released their own iPhone app.

Just before fall, the band supported Pennywise on their Canadian tour throughout September. Later that year, they covered Bad Religion's "Heaven Is Falling" for the album "Germs of Perfection: A Tribute to Bad Religion." The "free mixtape" was released on October 19, 2010 through SPIN's website.

=== Second label and The Wolf You Feed (2011–2013) ===
The Riverboat Gamblers were featured on MacDougall and Lillard's side-project Broken Gold's track "Ambulance Faces" in March 2011.

The band co-headlined a nationwide U.S. tour with Dead To Me and Off With Their Heads the summer of 2011 and released a three-way split that was only available to those attending. In July, it was announced that the band signed to Paper + Plastick Records and would release their EP "Smash/Grab" along with the free song "The Ol' Smash and Grab." After the tour, they returned to the studio to finish their sixth studio album. In November 2011, "The Ol' Smash and Grab" music video was released.

The band supported Social Distortion on select dates in early May 2012. The Wolf You Feed, their latest studio album, was released on May 22, 2012. To support the album, the Riverboat Gamblers and Cobra Skulls went on the "Wolf & Snakes Tour" through the whole of October 2012. In the same month, they released the music video for their song "Eviction Notice" from the album.

Music videos for the singles "Good Veins," "Comedians" and "Blue Ghosts" were released in April and June 2013. The Riverboat Gamblers announced a summer tour with Blacklist Royals for the summer of 2013. In August 2013, the single "Heart Conditions" had a music video released that served as a continuation to "Blue Ghosts."

=== Wiebe's injury and Massive Fraud (2014–2020) ===
The last single from "The Wolf You Feed" was "Gallows Bird" and its music video was released in June 2014. In October 2014, the Riverboat Gamblers announced their single "Dead Roach" which was released alongside their B-side cover of "Sound On Sound" by The Big Boys. This was recorded with Stuart Sikes at Big Orange in Texas and was the first of what would be three single releases through End Sounds. "Sound on Sound" originally appeared on a twenty band compilation album entitled "Influence: A Tribute to Big Boys" released by Canadian label Stiff Hombre Records in June 2014.

The band opened for Rocket From The Crypt in November 2014 and Bad Religion in April 2015.

Their cover of The Soft Boys' "I Wanna Destroy You" premiered on November 16, 2015. It was released as a B-side to their single "Time to Let Her Go".

On March 18, 2016 during their performance at SXSW, Wiebe suffered a collapsed lung and broken ribs after a failed trust fall. The band continued the show and cancelled further performances until Wiebe recovered in the hospital.

In the following April, the band announced that their latest single "Massive Fraud" would be released on June 24, 2016 as the last part of their single series on End Sounds along with a B-side cover of The Dicks' "Hate the Police."

The announcement of Warped Tour 2017 included the Riverboat Gamblers to appear on two dates in July 2017 on the Skullcandy Stage.

=== El-Assad's injury and Punk Rock Bowling (2020–present) ===
The band has performed regularly at the Punk Rock Bowling music festival in Las Vegas since 2005. At their 2021 Punk Rock Bowling show on September 26, Fadi El-Assad sustained a serious rupture of the achilles tendon. He flew home the following day for doctor's visits and subsequent surgeries to correct the injury. The Gamblers were able to play one final show this year with El-Assad at the Punk in the Park music festival in Orange County, California. In lieu of live performances during the rest of the year and into the early part of the following year, the band instead focused on writing new material for upcoming releases during El-Assad's recovery.

=== Other appearances ===
The band was featured as a band at a punk show in the 2016 Richard Linklater film Everybody Wants Some!!.

They have also appeared on the soundtracks to the videogames Tony Hawk's American Wasteland ("Hey! Hey! Hey!"), Madden NFL 07 ("On Again Off Again"), Skate 2 ("Uh Oh!"), Rock Band 3 ("Don't Bury Me... I'm Still Not Dead"), FlatOut: Ultimate Carnage, ATV Offroad Fury 4 ("True Crime") and Need for Speed: Most Wanted ("Blue Ghosts").

== Band members ==
- Fadi El-Assad ("Freddy Castro") - Lead Guitar
- Mike Wiebe ("Teko Buller" or "Rookie Sensation") - vocals
- Ian MacDougall - Guitar
- Rob Marchant - Bass
- Sam Keir - Drums

== Discography ==
Studio Albums

- The Riverboat Gamblers (Beatville/Vilebeat Records) (2001)
- Something to Crow About (Gearhead Records) (2003)
- Backsides (Beatville/Vilebeat Records) (2004)
- To the Confusion of Our Enemies (Volcom Entertainment/No Idea) (2006)
- Underneath the Owl (Volcom Entertainment) (2009)
- The Wolf You Feed (Volcom Entertainment) (2012)

Compilations

- Purplish Rain SPIN RECORDS PRESENTS Compilation "Lets Go Crazy" (2009)
- Chemical X DVD Music Video Compilation (Geykido Comet Records)
- Influence: A Tribute to Big Boys (Stiff Hombre Records) "Sound on Sound" (2014)
- Starstruck: A Tribute to The Kinks (Wicked Opossum Records) "Father Christmas" (2022)

EPs, Splits, and Singles

- Mean Motormachine/Jenna (Is a No Show) 7" (self-released) (2001)
- That's Entertainment! Split 7" w/ Electric Eel Shock (Gearhead Records) (2004)
- A Tribute To The Big Boys Split 7" w/Throw Rag (Date Shake Records)
- Riverboat Gamblers/Generators 7" (Pirates Press)
- Keep Me From Drinking/No Fair' B-sides 7" (Volcom Entertainment)
- "Knowledge" an Operation Ivy song covered with Radio Havanna, Jim Lindberg(ex-pennywise) & The Black Pacific on iTunes. 100% of the proceeds from the song are going to Skate-aid, which uses the sport to help kids in high conflict areas. (2011)
- The Ol' Smash and Grab - EP (one sided 12" picture disc) (2011)
- Smash/Grab EP (Paper + Plastic) (2011)
- "Dead Roach"/"Sound on Sound" Single (End Sounds) (2014)
- "Time to Let Her Go"/"I Wanna Destroy You" Single (End Sounds) (2015)
- "Massive Fraud"/"Hate the Police" Single (End Sounds) (2016)
- "Live with Orchestra" Single (self-released) (2020)
- "RAMOTORHEAD" Single (self-released) (2021)
- "Two Little Hearts"/"Denton" Single (Anxious & Angry) (2022)
- "Father Christmas" (Stuart Sikes Stereo Mix)/"Father Christmas" (Shel Talmy Mono Mix) Single (Wicked Opossum Records) (2022)

== Professional reviews ==
- Review on Underneath the owl, Punk76.com, 2009
