= Peelander-Z =

Japanese-American punk rock band

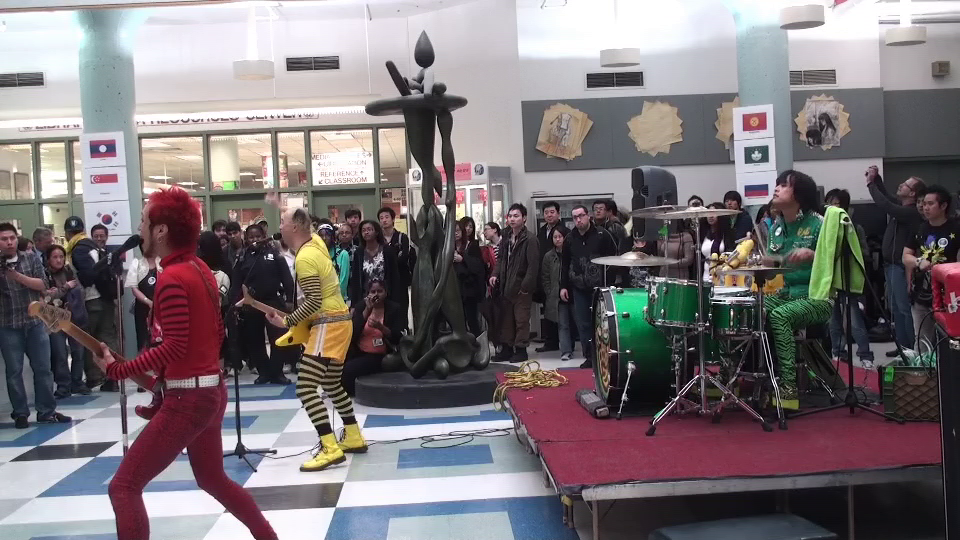
- Peelander-Z performing at the Asian Heritage celebration in New York; left to right: Peelander Pink, Peelander Yellow and Peelander Green

Background information
- Origin: Japan (band members); Buffalo, New York (band)
- Genres: Punk rock
- Years active: 1998–present
- Labels: Eat Rice; Swell; Geykido Comet; Chicken Ranch
- Members: Kengo Hioki (Peelander Yellow); Yumiko Kanazaki (Peelander Pink); Hideyuki Watanabe (Peelander Tiger)
- Past members: Kazuki Yamamoto (Peelander Blue); Kotaro Tsukada (Peelander Red); Akihiko Naruse; Testuya Hayakawa (Peelander Black); Akiteru Ito (Peelander Purple); Ryo Tanaka (Peelander Green)
- Website: Official Website

Peelander-Z is a Japanese-American punk rock band formed in 1998 and based in Austin, Texas. They bill themselves as a "Japanese Action Comic Punk band hailing from the Z area of Planet Peelander". While the founding members of Peelander-Z were all born in Japan, they first met and formed their band while living in Buffalo, New York. The original three members of the band were billed as Peelander Yellow, Peelander Red, and Peelander Blue. Later members of the band have adopted the same naming structure, with mostly different colors, although one name, Peelander Green, has been used by two different drummers.

They perform on stage and appear in color-coordinated costumes, which they state are not costumes, but their skin. The costumes range from sentai style suits, to kimono, to rubber Playmobil style wigs. There is also a tiger costume and a giant squid/guitar costume to coincide with the song "Mad Tiger". Another aspect of their routine is their on-stage antics such as human bowling (diving head-first into bowling pins), pretending to hit each other with chairs in imitation of pro-wrestlers, and mid-performance piggyback rides. They often allow audience members on stage to join in on the fun, and often dive into the audience or hang from a balcony as part of their act.

== History ==
In 2000, the band released a self-titled mini-album on Eat Rice Records. The band was also featured on an episode of the Upright Citizens Brigade on Comedy Central.

In 2001, Peelander-Z released their first full-length album, "Rocket Gold Star", on Eat Rice Records. The band remained active that year, touring both Canada and Japan.

In June 2008, Peelander Blue announced he would be leaving the group to "go back to the Peelander-planet" because he is "a prince of P-Planet" and the "P-King will be retiring." (P-Blue was getting married and could no longer tour.) In July 2008, Peelander-Z welcomed Peelander-Green.

On September 17, 2012, Peelander-Red announced he would be leaving the band at the end of their U.S. tour. He left the band to open up his own bar in New York. Peelander-Purple, Akiteru Ito, joined the band as his replacement in February 2013.

In late 2013, Peelander Green left the band and has since been replaced by several temporary members, including Becoming the Archetype drummer Chris Heaton. He was later replaced by Ryo Tanaka, formerly of the Japanese band Spica. Tanaka left the band some time later.

Videos surfacing from 2015 live concerts show Peelander-Z performing as only a three-piece band with Yellow on Guitar, Green on drums and Pink on bass.

In 2016, Film Movement released Mad Tiger, the feature documentary film about the band's inner turmoil during and after Peelander-Red's departure, and leading into Peelander-Green's departure. The film was in production from 2012 to 2015 and was directed by Jonathan Yi and Michael Haertlein. The film revealed that Hioki and Kanazaki were married.

Peelander-Z released an album titled Go PZ Go on April 6, 2018.

The band canceled a planned 2020 tour due to the COVID-19 pandemic. Ito left the band in 2022.

The band released a new album titled P-Party Z-Party in 2023. They had a 25th anniversary tour that year as a three-piece band with Yellow on Guitar and vocals, Pink on a sampler, and Green on drums. Drummer Scott Sticker filled in as Green on that tour.

=== 2026 crash ===
On May 18, 2026, the band's van was rear-ended by a tractor-trailer while en route to a show in Moriarty, New Mexico. Hioki, Kanazaki and Peelander Tiger, identified in the crash report as Hideyuki Watanabe, were hospitalized with critical injuries. Hioki was briefly placed on a ventilator. The van was a total loss, and some equipment and personal items were also destroyed in the crash. Chicken Ranch Records established a crowdfunding page to support the band's medical expenses. A benefit concert is set for May 29 in Albuquerque. The remainder of the band's spring tour was canceled. In June, all three band members were transferred back to Austin to complete their recovery. The crash report blamed inattentiveness on the part of the van driver, who had slowed in a traffic lane.

== Members ==
- Kengo Hioki (a.k.a. Peelander Yellow) - lead vocals and guitar
- Yumiko Kanazaki (a.k.a. Peelander Pink) - keyboards, bass, and flashlight
- Hideyuki Watanabe (a.k.a. Peelander Tiger)

=== Former members ===
- Kazuki Yamamoto (a.k.a. Peelander Blue) - drums and backing vocals
- Kotaro Tsukada (a.k.a. Peelander Red) - bass and backing vocals
- Akihiko "Cherry" Naruse (a.k.a. Peelander Green) - drums and smiles
- Testuya Hayakawa (a.k.a. Peelander Black) - guitar
- Ryo Tanaka (a.k.a. Peelander Green) - drums
- Akiteru Ito (a.k.a. Peelander Purple) - bass and backing vocals
- Scott Sticker (a.k.a. Peelander Green) - drums

== Discography ==
=== Albums ===
- Peelander-Z (2000)
- Rocket Gold Star (2001)
- P-Bone Steak (2003)
- Dancing Friendly (2005)
- Happee Mania (2006)
- P-Pop-High School (2009)
- P-TV-Z (2010)
- Space Vacation (2012)
- Metalander-Z (2013)
- Live At Red 7 (2017)
- Go PZ Go! (2018)
- P-Party! Z-Party! (2023)

=== Compilations ===
- You Call This Music?! Volume 2 (2002)
- Shit Associated Music Vol.1 (2002)
- Six Steps To A Better You:SA Self Improvement Compilation (2003)
- This Just In... Benefit For Indy Media (2005)
- Candy Poison Vol. 2 (2005)
- Nitro Franken Reloaded!!! Kill Kill (2005)
- Teriyaki Suplexxx (2007)

=== Vinyl ===
- split 7-inch with Four Letter Words (2000)
- split 7-inch with Birthday Suits (2008)
- split 7-inch with Loafass (2008) - Buttbread Records
- split 7-inch with Electric Eel Shock (2013)

=== DVD ===
- Peelander is FUN! (2007)
- Chemical X Music Video Compilation (2008)
- P-TV-ZD (included with CD and LP pressing of album) (2010)
- Super DX Hitz (Karaoke DVD included with CD of album) (2011)
- Space Vacation (included with LP of album) (2012)
- Mad Tiger (2016)

== Stage Act ==
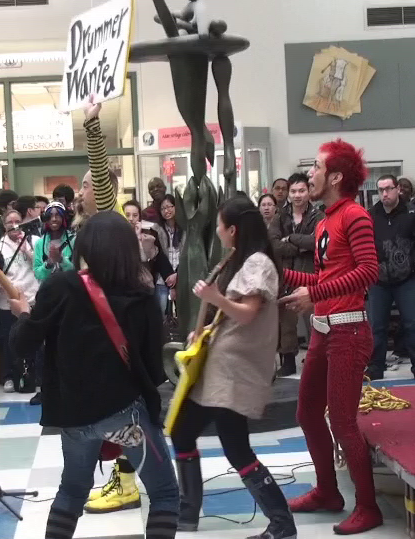
Peelander-Z with Esther Ku and audience member playing the guitar and bass

Peelander-Z has a complex stage act, which involves hand-written signs, costumes, and audience participation. The signs often contain the lyrics to their songs. At some of their shows they also bring people from outside of the band on stage to play their instruments as they do a stage act.

== Wrestling ==
Professional wrestling is a big theme in Peelander-Z's personas. Peelander Blue dresses in pro-wrestling garb, including a replica wrestling belt. All 3 members of the group are fans of professional wrestling, and are friends with independent wrestlers "M-Dogg 20" Matt Cross and Josh Prohibition. They have also been musically featured with pro-wrestling related Kaiju Big Battel.

On June 23, 2007, the group performed at The Florida Supercon in Fort Lauderdale. During their concert, pro-wrestler Nick Mayberry rushed the stage and threatened to assault the group. The trio were able to fight back, and both Peelander Blue and Peelander Red pinned Mayberry simultaneously - being named new co-HCW Hardcore Champions. This was their first pro-wrestling Title win.

On November 3, 2007, Mayberry appeared again with the group at the JaniCon in Jacksonville, Florida. He again made his way to the stage during their concert, assaulting the band and re-gaining HCW's Hardcore Championship, before being taken down by a chairshot from Peelander Blue. Peelander Blue, Peelander Red and Peelander Pink pinned Mayberry simultaneously, with all 3 being named co-HCW Hardcore Champions. It marks their second pro-wrestling Title victory.
