= Gitogito Hustler =

Japanese punk rock band

GitoGito Hustler
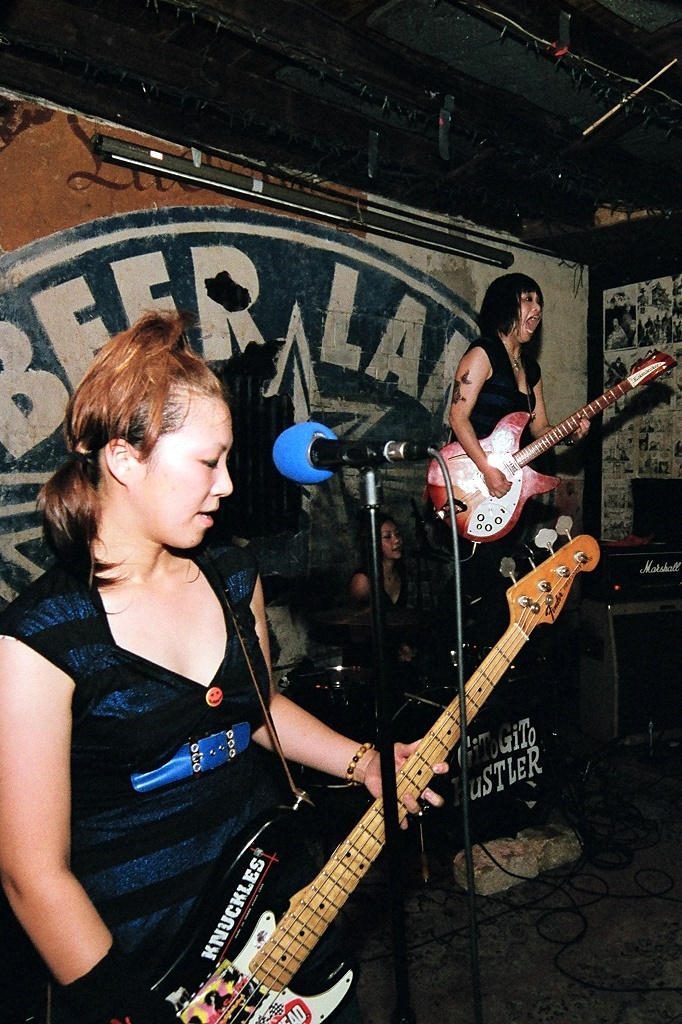
- GitoGito Hustler, performing in Austin, Texas at Beerland, Tae (bass) is in the foreground, with Yago (guitar and vox) in the background.

Background information
- Origin: Kyoto, Japan
- Genres: Garage punk Post-punk; Riot grrrl
- Years active: 1995–present
- Labels: Gearhead Records
- Members: Yago; Mitsuko; Tae (inactive); Fusa
- Website: English website Gearhead Records Page; GitoGito Hustler on Myspace.com

GitoGito Hustler (ギトギトハスラ→ in Japanese; also spelled Gitogito Hustler) is a Japanese all-female punk rock band.

The four-member group was formed in 1995 in Kyoto, Japan and is now based in Tokyo. Members include Yago (vocals and guitar), Mitsuko (guitar), Tae (bass guitar), and Fusa (drums). Yago and Fusa are sisters, and Fusa is the younger of the two. Tae resigned the group in 2008. GitoGito Hustler's recordings are released by Gearhead Records. They have toured Japan and the United States multiple times.
