= Electric Eel Shock =

Japanese band

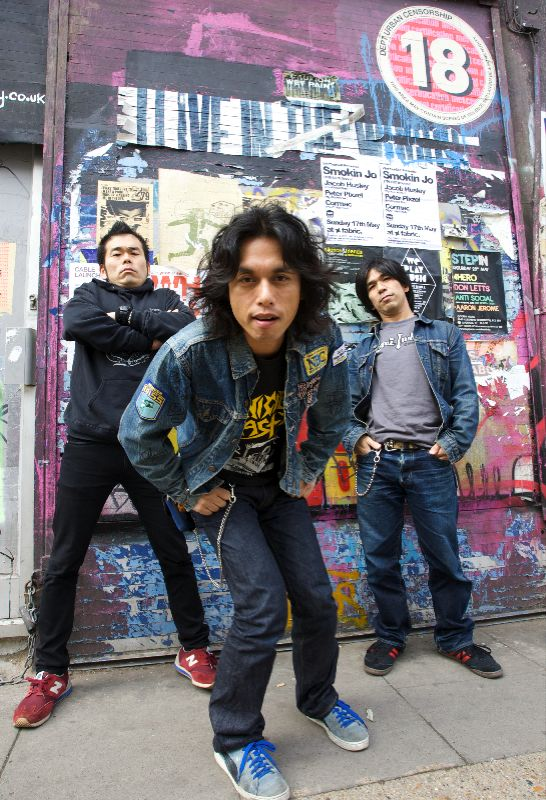

Background information
- Origin: Tokyo, Japan
- Genres: Garage rock, hard rock, rock and roll, heavy metal
- Years active: 1994–present
- Labels: Double Peace, Rodeostar (Germany), Universal (Japan), Roadrunner Japan, Gearhead, Spooky, Bitzcore
- Members: Akihito Morimoto; Kazuto Maekawa; Tomoharu "Gian" Ito
- Website: www.electriceelshock.com

Electric Eel Shock (EES) is a three-man garage rock band, formed in Tokyo in 1994. Their first international tour was in the United States in 1999.

== History ==
=== Background ===
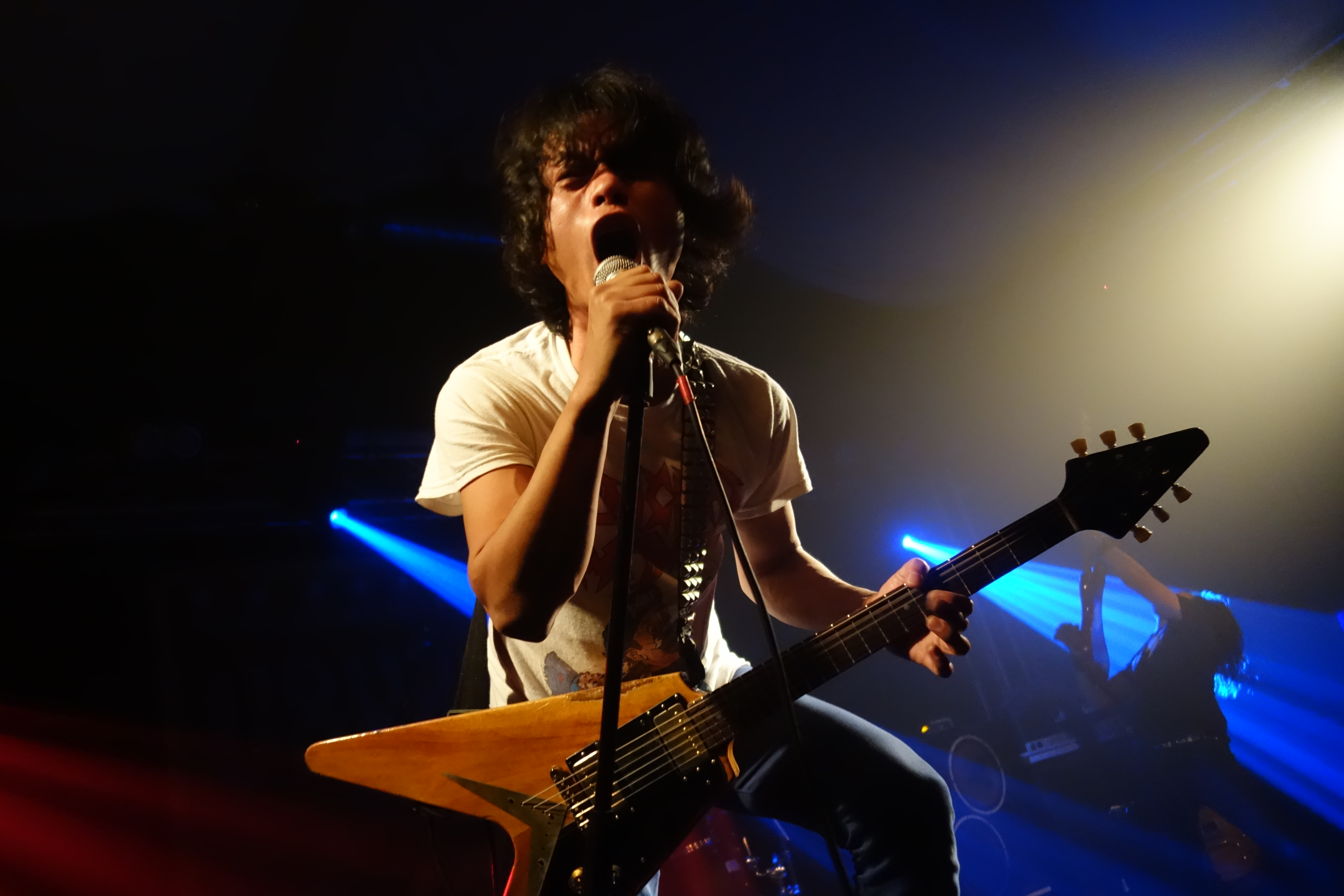
Akihito Morimoto 2016 at Das Bett in Frankfurt

Akihito "Aki" Morimoto (guitar and vocals) and Kazuto Maekawa (bass) first met in high school in Osaka. Aki learned English by listening to the lyrics of his favorite bands. Before Electric Eel Shock, Aki and Maekawa first formed an 80s metal cover band in high school called Caducious.

Aki and Maekawa remained in Tokyo. Aki followed his passion for fishing and became a competitive angler (he still writes for Japan's largest fishing magazine, Basser Magazine) and Maekawa joined The Apollos (a Japanese funk band) for a short time as session bassist. Maekawa introduced their drummer, Tomoharu Ito (known as Gian, due to his similar appearance to a well-known Japanese comedian of that name) to Aki. Gian, Maekawa, and Aki started practicing together shortly afterwards.

=== Early years ===
The band's first public performances was as an 11-piece group with keyboards, female vocals, and French horns. The only release by this line-up was a five-track demo cassette, titled "Double Peace 1.01". When logistics became unworkable the band stripped down to a three-piece.

Gian began playing with four drumsticks and gained a reputation for performing almost naked. Gian was arrested in Hong Kong and fined HK$100, for playing this way.

Electric Eel Shock set up the Micro Music record label with their friends and released their first full-length album, Maybe... I Think We Can Beat Nirvana. They followed this with Live Punctured.

In 1999, Electric Eel Shock recorded Slayers Bay Blues on an eight-track recorder, and made enough copies to begin their first concerts abroad. They had lined up a handful of dates in and around New York, including CBGB, with their friends Peelander-Z who had relocated there some time earlier. Due to the success of these gigs, the initially planned handful of dates expanded into an East Coast tour.

=== Go America ===
The band returned to the US and toured almost constantly for the next two years. All the while, the band survived on the sale of CDs, t-shirts, and help from friends. They then recorded the EP Go America.

=== Go Europe ===
In early 2003, the band received an email invitation from journalist Bob Slayer to perform in London. On January 16, 2003, Electric Eel Shock landed in London for five hastily arranged gigs. The five shows became twelve gigs in ten days. The band relied exclusively on `the London Underground as their only form of transport. Their final date was supporting Australian band Grinspoon in front of 2000 people at Hammersmith Palais. After this, they returned to the US with Bob Slayer as their new manager.

The band spent the rest of 2003 between the US and Europe. Highlights included playing at both the SXSW and CMJ festivals in America, playing at Roskilde Festival in Denmark, headlining the Rockit Hong Kong Music Festival, and supporting the Canadian band Danko Jones on a 40-date European tour.

At the start of 2004, Electric Eel Shock went into the studio for the last of the Go sessions. Although these were still produced on a relatively low budget, and paid for by the band, this was the first time that they had used a studio and sound engineer as opposed to a practice room, kitchen or cupboard. The results, Go Europe! / Go USA!, were licensed around the world and the band went on a promotional tour that took in 25 countries and 27 European festivals.

=== Beat Me ===
The band's European base camp for much of their touring in 2004 was the Suicide Motel in Utrecht, Netherlands, which Bob Slayer set up with Frank Suicide the guitarist of the Dutch band Wasted. Whilst spending time in the Netherlands, they developed their friendship with Grammy-nominated producer, Attie Bauw, (who had worked with Judas Priest and the Scorpions) that they had met in Amsterdam during the Danko Jones tour. Electric Eel Shock were soon making plans with Bauw for a new album. The aim was to capture the energy and character of an Electric Eel Shock performance with a production comparable to the early Black Sabbath albums that inspired their creation. Assisting Attie in the studio was the band's live engineer, Tim Bray, who had become a fixture on tour with the band.

The band finished recording Beat Me at the end of December 2004, and returned to Japan for the first time in a long time, to do a few gigs.

Throughout 2005 EES shows became larger; with tours in the US and Europe alongside the Bloodhound Gang, headlining festivals, and playing with the West Yorkshire Symphony Orchestra. Electric Eel Shock also made an appearance in the video clip for the Bloodhound Gang song "Uhn Tiss Uhn Tiss Uhn Tiss". Their tours throughout Europe at the end of 2005 were completely sold out.

In March 2006, Beat Me was released in Japan on legendary metal label Roadrunner Records. The band toured Japan, Australia, New Zealand and the US in 2006 and played festivals in Europe.

=== Transworld Ultra Rock ===
Electric Eel Shock released Transworld Ultra Rock on October 1, 2007. The album was the first release on their own label Double Peace Records. The band toured throughout Europe in support of the new album, later appearing as a support act on The Presidents of the United States of America's These Are the Good Times People tour. The album was released by P-Vine records on November 16, 2007 in Japan.

=== Sugoi Indeed ===
Electric Eel Shock joined Sellaband on 2 May 2008 to raise the funds to record their next album. On 25 June 2008 after 55 days the band successfully raised $50,000.

The press release describes Sugoi Indeed as an album full of classic rock hand-crafted in Japan. Attie Bauw, who produced the last two EES albums, was at the controls again, only this time he engineered the basic tracks and Electric Eel Shock took the production reins on the album themselves.

The album was licensed to several labels around the world and was released in October 2009.

=== Crowdfunding ===
Electric Eel Shock has strong support from their fans and became one of the first bands without previous significant record label success to fully embrace crowdfunding. In 2004 they raised £10,000 from 100 fans (the Samurai 100) by offering them guestlist for life. Two years later they became the fastest band to raise the 50,000 budget through SellaBand. The album Sugoi Indeed has been licensed to Universal Records in Japan and various independent labels around the world.

EES and their UK based manager Bob Slayer became consultants on first SellaBand and later PledgeMusic. Having played an important role in establishing the viability and model for crowdfunding in music, they have now launched their own crowd funding site Fan-Bo.com. Launched in June 2012, Fan-Bo is a place where fans of Japanese pop culture can support independent bands, artists, writers and other creatives.

== Discography ==
=== Albums ===
- Maybe... I Think We Can Beat Nirvana (1997)
- Live Punctured (1998)
- Slayers Bay Blues (1999)
- Go Europe! (2004)
- Go USA! (2005)
- Beat Me (2005)
- Transworld Ultra Rock (2007)
- Sugoi Indeed (2009)
- Sweet Generation (2017)
- Heavy Metal Black Belt (2024)

=== Singles/EPs ===
- Go America (EP) (2002)
- Do The Metal 7" (2003)
- Rock & Roll Can Rescue the World Split 7" w/The Riverboat Gamblers (2005)
- Big Mistake 7" (2007)
- Attack America II CD Single (2012)

=== Videos/DVDs ===
- Slayer's Bay Blues (2000) VHS
- Go Roskilde (2003) Live Concert DVD

=== Compilations ===
- Welcome To Gearhead Country (Gearhead) (2006)
- Thunder Tracks (DefSTAR) (2008)

=== Documentaries ===
Sex, Drugs, & Email

== Live drummers ==
From 2007 to 2011 Gian was unable to make all tours, when he was not available to tour EES used a number of stand in drummers: Gian has now returned to the band permanently.

- Damon Richardson (ex Danko Jones) - Europe 2007
- Roland Ritchie (ex Wasted) - the Netherlands and HMV
- Kosho - Wacken 2007
- Hiroto "The Ginger Drummer" - Presidents of USA tour
- James "Bronski Beat" Thomas (ex Sludgefeast and A&E Line)
