= Evans v. Cornman =

- Supreme Court of the United States

Argued January 22, 1970 Decided June 15, 1970
- Full case name: Evans et al. v. Cornman et al.
- Citations: 398 U.S. 419 (more) 90 S. Ct. 1752; 26 L. Ed. 2d 370

Case history
- Prior: Cornman v. Dawson, 295 F. Supp. 654 (D. Md. 1969); probable jurisdiction noted, 396 U.S. 812 (1969).

Holding
- Residents of federal enclaves are treated as state residents to such an extent that the Fourteenth Amendment requires the state to allow them to vote.

Court membership
- Chief Justice Warren E. Burger Associate Justices Hugo Black · William O. Douglas; John M. Harlan II · William J. Brennan Jr. Potter Stewart · Byron White; Thurgood Marshall · Harry Blackmun

Case opinion
- Majority: Marshall, joined by Burger, Black, White, Douglas, Harlan, Brennan, Stewart
- Blackmun took no part in the consideration or decision of the case.

Laws applied
- Amendment XIV

Evans v. Cornman, 398 U.S. 419 (1970), was a United States Supreme Court case in which the Court held that to deny people living in federal enclaves the right to vote is a violation of their right to Equal Protection under the Fourteenth Amendment.

== Background ==
Article One of the United States Constitution, Section 8, Clause 18, allows Congress "to exercise exclusive legislation in all cases whatsoever, over such District (not exceeding ten miles square) as may, by cession of particular states, and the acceptance of Congress, become the seat of the government of the United States, and to exercise like authority over all places purchased by the consent of the legislature of the state in which the same shall be, for the erection of forts, magazines, arsenals, dockyards, and other needful buildings."

The rights of residents of such federal enclaves was argued in Howard v. Commissioners of Sinking Fund of Louisville when the residents of an enclave sued to be exempted from certain taxation by the City of Louisville by arguing that the annexation of the enclave by the city violated the "exclusive legislation" clause and so the city's claim to the area was unconstitutional. That was rejected, and it was ruled that the enclaves continue to be part of the states of which they were a part: "A state may conform its municipal structures to its own plan, so long as the state does not interfere with the exercise of jurisdiction within the federal area by the United States."

In 1963, a Maryland Appeals Court ruled, in Royer v. Board of Election Supervisors, that residents of federal jurisdictions were not entitled to vote in Maryland.

Land in Montgomery County, Maryland, was purchased for the National Cancer Institute in the 1930s and was officially made a US jurisdiction in 1953. Both before and after the cession of the land, residents of the complex registered and voted in Montgomery County without incident. Then, in October 1968, the Permanent Board of Registry of Montgomery County, Maryland, citing Royer v. Board of Elections Supervisors, announced that persons living on the National Institutes of Health (NIH) federal reservation or enclave located within its geographical boundaries did not meet the residency requirement of Article 1 of the Maryland Constitution. The people were thus not qualified to vote as residents of Maryland. Several residents of the enclave sued the Permanent Board for a three-judge Federal District Court to be convened to enjoin as unconstitutional the application of the Maryland voter residency law.

The Federal District Court issued a temporary injunction allowing residents to vote in the 1968 elections. In the actual argument of the case, the District Court held that to deny the residents the right to vote was to deny them equal protection of the laws, but the case was appealed to the Supreme Court.

== Decision ==
The Supreme Court, in a decision written by Justice Marshall, joined by Justices Black, Douglas, Harlan, Brennan, Stewart, White, and Chief Justice Burger, ruled that the precedent of Howard meant that the complex was part of Maryland and so its residents counted as residents of Maryland in every other way and had substantial interest in the governance of the enclave. As it was subject the legislation of the state and county, they could not be denied the vote without violating their constitutional right to equal protection. Justice Blackmun did not take part, and there were no dissensions or concurrences.

== Subsequent developments ==
Evans v. Cornman is often cited, usually among other precedents, in cases concerning violations of the Fourteenth Amendment, as it pertains to voting rights and representation, especially in cases concerning residency requirements (Oregon v. Mitchell, Mobile v. Bolden, Whatley v. Clark, Dunn v. Blumstein, etc.). The case has recently been cited in arguments in favor of national representation for the District of Columbia.
