= P-Pop-High School =

P-POP-HIGH SCHOOL

Studio album by Peelander-Z
- Released: April 14, 2009
- Genre: Punk
- Length: 39:04
- Label: Geykido Comet Records

Peelander-Z chronology
| Happee Mania (2006) | P-POP-HIGH SCHOOL (2009) | P-TV-Z (2010) |

Professional ratings
Review scores
| Source | Rating |
|---|---|
| AsiaXpress.com | link |

P-Pop-High School is the fifth album released by Peelander-Z.

== Track listing ==
1. "P-Pop-High School" – 0:40
2. "Let's Go! Karaoke Party!" – 2:42
3. "Beautiful Sundae" – 1:07
4. "Handsome" – 1:43
5. "Panda-III" – 3:01
6. "Pillow Pillow" – 2:41
7. "Learn Japanese" – 1:43
8. "Duct Tape" – 1:14
9. "Give Me Your Smile" – 6:07
10. "Super Health" – 2:31
11. "Autograph" – 3:11
12. "Pho!" – 2:34
13. "P-Zombie-Z" – 2:54
14. "So Many Mike" – 1:55
15. "Ninja-High Schooool" – 4:18
16. "Smile Again" – 0:51
