= Cornman: American Vegetable Hero =

2001 film by Barak Epstein

- Theatrical Poster
- Directed by: Barak Epstein
- Written by: Barak Epstein
- Produced by: Barak Epstein; Robert Epstein
- Starring: Mike Wiebe; Melissa Bacelar; Adam Lockhart; James Hoke
- Cinematography: Robert Johnson
- Edited by: Michael Fleetwood
- Music by: James Hoke; Mike Wiebe
- Distributed by: WorldWide International Picture Studios
- Release date: March 10, 2001
- Country: United States
- Language: English

Cornman: American Vegetable Hero a.k.a. Cornman II: The Day of the Locusts is an American cult movie first released in March 2001 by WorldWide International Picture Studios, known for producing low budget B-movies with campy concepts. The film premiered at the South by Southwest Film Festival on March 10, 2001. The film was directed by Barak Epstein and starred Mike Wiebe and James Hoke. The film is a homage/parody of superhero films.

== Plot ==
Cornman is a superhero whose powers include the ability to communicate with corn. He must face the evil Dr. Hoe who is trying to take control of all the corn in the world.

== Cast ==
Actor	Role
Mike Wiebe	Dr. Hoe
James Hoke	Cornman
Adam Lockhart	Cornman
Melissa Bacelar	Sheila #3
Daniel Villarreal	The Psychic Nose / Footsoldier
Noe Garcia	Butterboy
Blair Rowan	Starch
Mae Moreno	Waxy
Robert Bell	Huckleberry Rob / Footsoldier
Russell Gavin Cooper	Cornsparagus
Jeannie Elliot	Sheila #2

== Awards ==
The film won several awards at the various film festivals where it was screened. It premiered at the 2001 South by Southwest Film Festival, but failed to garner any awards there. The film won the 2001 Deep Ellum Award for Best Comedy Feature at the Deep Ellum Film Festival.
