= Federal enclave =

Parcel of land which is within a state but under federal jurisdiction

In United States law, a federal enclave is a parcel of federal property within a state considered under the special maritime and territorial jurisdiction of the United States. These enclaves are used for the many different functions of the U.S. federal government including post offices, arsenals, dams, road, etc.; many are usually owned, secured, and administered by the U.S. federal government itself. The U.S., in many cases, has also received similar jurisdictional authority over privately owned properties which it leases, as well as privately owned and occupied properties which are located within the exterior boundaries of a large area (such as the District of Columbia and various national parks) which a state has ceded jurisdiction to.

Since the late 1950s, it has been an official federal policy that states should have full concurrent jurisdiction on all federal enclaves, an approach endorsed by some legal experts. In 1960, the year of the latest comprehensive inquiry, 7% of federal property had enclave status. Of the land with federal enclave status, 57% (4% of federal property, almost all in Alaska and Hawaii) were under "concurrent" state jurisdiction. The remaining 43% (3% of federal property), on which some state laws do not apply, was scattered throughout the U.S. In 1960, there were about 5,000 enclaves with about one million people living on them altogether. While a comprehensive inquiry has not been performed since 1960, these statistics are likely much lower today since many federal enclaves were military bases that have since been closed and/or transferred out of federal ownership.

== Relation to other subdivisions ==
Since the 1953 Howard v. Commissioners case, the Supreme Court has held that the collection of city and state taxes from federal enclave residents is permissible, thus establishing the "Friction Not Fiction" doctrine.

Based on the "Friction Not Fiction" doctrine, residents of federal enclaves have the right to vote in the elections of the state in which the federal enclave is situated. This was challenged by a Maryland law in 1968, the subject of the case Evans v. Cornman; the case was decided by the Supreme Court in 1970 and overruled the Maryland law, thus upholding the voting rights of enclave residents and establishing that they should be regarded as residents of the state in question.

Federal enclaves are to be distinguished from federal territories and possessions administered under Article IV, Section 3, Clause 2; the latter once included all the territory that has since become states and still includes insular territories Puerto Rico, the United States Virgin Islands, Guam, American Samoa, and others. Historically, Congress has not exercised a full array of state-like powers over such territories but has tried to organize them into self-governing entities—as was done with the Northwest Ordinance and the Southwest Ordinance.

== History ==
=== Early developments ===
The first federal enclaves were created by the same clause of the Constitution that created the District of Columbia. That clause provides for the United States to exercise "exclusive Legislation" over the new Seat of Government and "like authority" over:

... all Places purchased by the Consent of the Legislature of the State in which the Same shall be, for the Erection of Forts, Magazines, Arsenals, dock-Yards, and other needful Buildings.

Because of the Enclave Clause, whenever a state government consented to the purchase of property by the federal government for a needful building, the U.S. obtained exclusive legislative jurisdiction over that parcel of property. In 1841, the Congress enacted a general law requiring state consent for all federal building projects. Moreover, the U.S. Attorneys General ruled that, in consenting to purchase, the states could reserve no jurisdiction except for the service of criminal and civil processes.

=== 1885: Cession and reservation as alternatives ===
In 1885, the Supreme Court ruled that there were two additional ways in which the U.S. could acquire federal enclaves: (1) the states could "cede" legislative jurisdiction to the United States and/or (2) the United States could "reserve" legislative jurisdiction at the time of statehood. The Supreme Court added that these "cessions" and "reservations" were not limited to Enclave Clause ("needful building") purposes.

Because state laws did not apply to federal enclaves, Congress provided a few basic criminal laws in the Federal Crimes Act of 1790, later adopting a series of Assimilative Crimes Acts and "federalizing" each state's crimes by making them prosecutable in federal courts. The Assimilative Crimes Act only applies to federal properties where the federal government has obtained exclusive or concurrent jurisdiction; federal property under a proprietorial interest only cannot assimilate state laws and enforce them as federal laws.

=== International law rule ===
Congress provided no civil laws to govern these enclaves. Thus, in 1885, the Supreme Court held that the "international law rule" applied. That rule states that when a territory is transferred from one government to another (such as when a federal enclave is ceded), laws for the protection of private rights continue in force until abrogated or changed by the new government.

Under the doctrine of extraterritoriality, a federal enclave was treated as a "state within a state" until 1953; therefore, enclave residents were not residents of the overarching state. As a result, they could not vote in state elections, attend public schools, obtain a divorce in state courts, or call upon state law enforcement officers to protect them from criminals.

=== After 1900: Congress begins to authorize state laws ===
In the 20th century, Congress gradually authorized the enforcement of some state laws on federal enclaves. In 1928, Congress made some state laws, governing wrongful death and personal injuries, applicable to federal enclaves. In the late 1930s, Congress authorized states to apply their state taxes on fuel, income, sales and use (the Buck Act), and state laws governing worker's compensation and unemployment insurance.

=== 1937: Supreme Court allows states to reserve jurisdiction ===
In 1937, because of concern over the lack of state law on federal enclaves, the Supreme Court held that states could reserve some jurisdiction to themselves in consenting to federal legislative jurisdiction. In response, the states began to amend their "consent" and "cession" statutes to reserve state jurisdiction, including the power to tax enclave residents.

To distinguish earlier "exclusive" jurisdiction enclaves from those acquired after the state amendments, the newer enclaves were labeled "partial" jurisdiction—the specific label "concurrent" was given to enclaves over which the state had full jurisdiction. Finally, non-enclave federal property was called "proprietorial interest only."

=== February 1, 1940: cessation of jurisdiction ===
Effective February 1, 1940, Congress repealed the 1841 statute requiring state consent to federal purchases; it instead said that the acquisition of federal property after that date would no longer result in the transfer of jurisdiction to the U.S. federal government unless the head of the federal agency in charge of the property filed a notice with the state governor accepting whatever jurisdiction was offered by the state. However, during World War II, the United States acquired many new military installations, during which the Secretary of War sent numerous letters to state governors accepting whatever jurisdiction the state offered, often without describing the location or boundaries of these military installations.

=== Post-WWII: Courts apply state laws without retrocession ===
After World War II, states began to apply state laws to enclave residents without waiting for Congress to act. Thus, in 1952, a California court gave enclave residents the right to vote in state elections, rejecting the "extraterritoriality" doctrine, and holding that enclave residents were residents of the state. In 1970, the Supreme Court agreed in Evans v. Cornman, holding that all enclave residents had a right to vote in state elections.

In 1950, without addressing the jurisdictional issue directly, Congress passed legislation providing federal financial aid to schools in localities impacted by federal facilities. Six years later, in 1956, the government reported that because of this federal aid, "not a single child is being denied the right to a public school education because of his residence on a federal enclave".

Earlier, courts in Kansas, Georgia, and New Mexico held they had no jurisdiction to grant divorces to residents of federal enclaves. After each state amended its divorce statutes to permit such divorces, however, court decisions in each state have upheld the validity of these statutes. Today, every state treats enclave residents as residents of the state for purposes of divorce proceedings.

=== 1953: Abolishment of the extraterritoriality doctrine ===
The extraterritoriality doctrine was abolished by the Supreme Court in 1953 in Howard v. Commissioners. The city of Louisville, Kentucky, had annexed a federal enclave into its city limits, thereby allowing the collection of city taxes from enclave residents under the Buck Act. Residents of the enclave argued that the annexation was improper because the federal enclave "ceased to be a part of Kentucky when the United States assumed exclusive jurisdiction over it"; the Supreme Court rejected the argument, holding that the annexation did not interfere with federal functions and emphasized "friction, not fiction":

A change of municipal boundaries did not interfere in the least with the jurisdiction of the United States within the area or with its use or disposition of the property. The fiction of a state within a state can have no validity to prevent the state from exercising its power over the federal area within its boundaries, so long as there is no interference with the jurisdiction asserted by the Federal Government. The sovereign rights in this dual relationship are not antagonistic. Accommodation and cooperation are their aim. It is friction, not fiction, to which we must give heed.

=== 1956: state law without retrocession, concurrent jurisdiction ===
In 1956, three years after Howard v. Commissioners, the Supreme Court in Offutt Housing Co. v. Sarpy County upheld Congress' power to authorize the application of state laws to federal enclaves without a "relinquishment" of jurisdiction. In affirming the state's right to tax a private builder of military housing, the Supreme Court emphasized that the Congress' authorization for state taxation on enclave property was not a retrocession: "We do not hold that Congress has relinquished this power over these areas. We hold only that Congress, in the exercise of this power, has permitted such state taxation as is involved in the present case."

Additionally, federal government reports in 1956 and 1957 concluded that the states should have full concurrent jurisdiction on all federal enclaves. In 1969, the Public Land Law Review Commission published a report on developments since the 1956 and 1957 reports, observing that those reports had been successful in changing federal agency policy and limiting further acquisition of federal enclaves. The 1969 report said that in 1960, there were about 5,000 enclaves with about a million people living on them.

=== 1970: "Friction Not Fiction" reiterated ===
In 1970, a year after the 1969 report, the Supreme Court in Evans v. Cornman unanimously held that enclave residents have a right to vote in state elections. In reaching this result, Evans reiterated the "friction not fiction" doctrine of Howard v. Commissioners, and reaffirmed that enclave residents should be regarded as residents of the state.

Evans also unanimously reaffirmed the holding in Offutt Housing that Congress could give states jurisdiction without relinquishing enclave status. The court relied in part on the fact that Congress had authorized the states to enforce many state laws on federal enclaves. Under Evans, Congress has the power, if it chooses, to authorize the enforcement of all state laws on federal enclaves; it need not "retrocede" or "relinquish" federal jurisdiction. Instead, it can simply "permit" all state laws to apply to all federal property regardless of "federal enclave" status.

Some criminal laws have also been authorized by Congress to apply on federal enclaves, including "immigrant stations" and Job Corps Centers. In addition, the states' power to enforce their tax laws on federal enclaves necessarily includes the power to prosecute enclave residents criminally for violating those laws.

In addition, the "friction not fiction" doctrine indicates that the courts can approve the application of state laws to federal enclaves to the same extent that they apply to the other 97% of federal lands (i.e., subject only to the limitations of the Supremacy Clause). With regard to the states' ability unilaterally to apply their laws on federal enclaves, Evans noted that enclave residents:

are required to register their automobiles in Maryland and obtain driver's permits and license plates from the State; they are subject to the process and jurisdiction of State courts; they themselves can resort to those courts in divorce and child adoption proceedings; and they send their children to Maryland public schools.

== Current legal status ==
=== State laws enforceable ===
In addition to laws mentioned by Evans, such court-applied laws include state probate laws, public welfare laws, laws relating to mentally ill persons, juvenile delinquency, protection of abused and neglected children, and domestic violence restraining orders.

=== State laws not enforceable ===
There are other cases which hold that some state laws do not apply on enclaves, including most state criminal laws, liquor laws, personal property taxes, some utility regulations, human rights laws, anti-discrimination laws, racial discrimination laws, whistleblower laws, state occupational safety and health (OSHA) laws, wage and hour laws, and right-to-work laws.

=== Effect of Mississippi Tax I opinion ===
Many Supreme Court decisions regarding federal enclaves are based on the extraterritoriality doctrine that was abolished by Howard and Evans. They often rely on dicta in the Supreme Court's 1973 Mississippi Tax I opinion (United States v. State Tax Commission of Mississippi) which ignored Howard and Evans and instead favorably quoted the district court's assertion that enclaves are "foreign land" and "federal islands which no longer constitute any part of Mississippi nor function under its control".

Nevertheless, Mississippi Tax I's holding—that the Twenty-first Amendment did not authorize a state "markup" on liquor—made it unnecessary to discuss enclave jurisdiction such that the "foreign lands" language was unnecessary. On the other hand, in 1990, the Supreme Court treated Mississippi Tax I as an enclave case, citing it for the proposition that a state had no authority to regulate a transaction between an out-of-state liquor supplier and a federal military base under exclusive federal jurisdiction.

Still, no court has suggested that Mississippi Tax I changed the "friction not fiction" rule of Howard and Evans. The Texas Court of Appeals noted the conflict and followed the "friction not fiction" rule in holding that the federal enclave at Red River Army Depot was part of Texas for state tax purposes. In upholding a state tax on aircraft parts, the court distinguished Mississippi Tax I on the grounds that, unlike the liquor markup in that case, in Aviall Services, Inc. v. Tarrant Appraisal Dist.:

[T]here was no interference with federal jurisdiction by the taxing entities; hence, no friction. Therefore, we will not apply the fiction that the Depot was a foreign country or a sister state to deem that the aviation parts were shipped by Aviall "outside the state" when they were shipped to a location in Bowie County near Texarkana, within the geographic limits of Texas.

Similarly, the California Court of Appeal has acknowledged Mississippi Tax I's statements about the enclave clause with regard to state liquor regulations but nevertheless relied on Howard and Evans to hold that the enclave clause did not prevent the application of state laws protecting dependent children.

=== Recent developments in National Forests ===
For many years, it was believed that "the vast majority" of National Forests were not federal enclaves. However, federal appeals courts in North Carolina, Michigan, and Oklahoma ruled in the 1990s and 2000s that "cession" statutes in each of those states ceded concurrent jurisdiction over National Forest lands acquired by the United States before February 1, 1940. Depending on the wording of "cession" statutes in other states, these cases may mean that the United States has considerable concurrent "enclave" jurisdiction in National Forests.

== See also ==
- Zone of Death (Yellowstone)
- Section 52 of the Constitution of Australia, establishing similar enclaves in Australia
