= Robin Kornman =

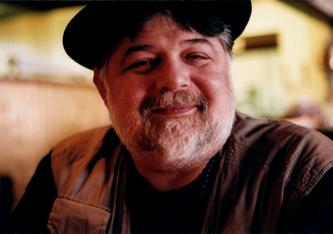
- Born: 17 April 1947; Nashville, TN, United States
- Died: 31 July 2007 (aged 60); Milwaukee, WI, United States
- Occupations: Buddhist, translator

Robin Kornman (April 17, 1947 – July 31, 2007) is best known for his work as a Tibetan Buddhist scholar, as well as a founding member of the Nalanda Translation Committee. Up until his death, he had spent many years working on an English translation of the Tibetan (living) epic Gesar of Ling — it is his work on this translation that has gained him the most recognition. A longtime student of Chögyam Trungpa Rinpoche, Kornman had been co-director of Trungpa Rinpoche's first Shambhala Buddhist retreat center in North America, Karmê Chöling, when first established in 1970.

Having earned his Ph.D. degree from Princeton University, Kornman was a professor of Comparative Literature at the University of Wisconsin - Milwaukee, published various translations and articles dealing with Buddhism, and acted as a meditation instructor and mentor to the Shambhala Buddhist Community.

== Bibliography ==
- Kornman, Robin (2011) The Epic of Gesar of Ling: Gesar's Magical Birth, Early Years, and Coronation as King ISBN 1-59030-842-5
- Kornman, Robin (2007) Creating Enlightened Society: The Oral Instructions of Chögyam Trungpa, Rinpoche (Great Path Tapes & Books)
- Midal, Fabrice ed. (2005) Recalling Chögyam Trungpa ISBN 1-59030-207-9
