= Mike Wiebe =

American musician, actor, stand-up comedian

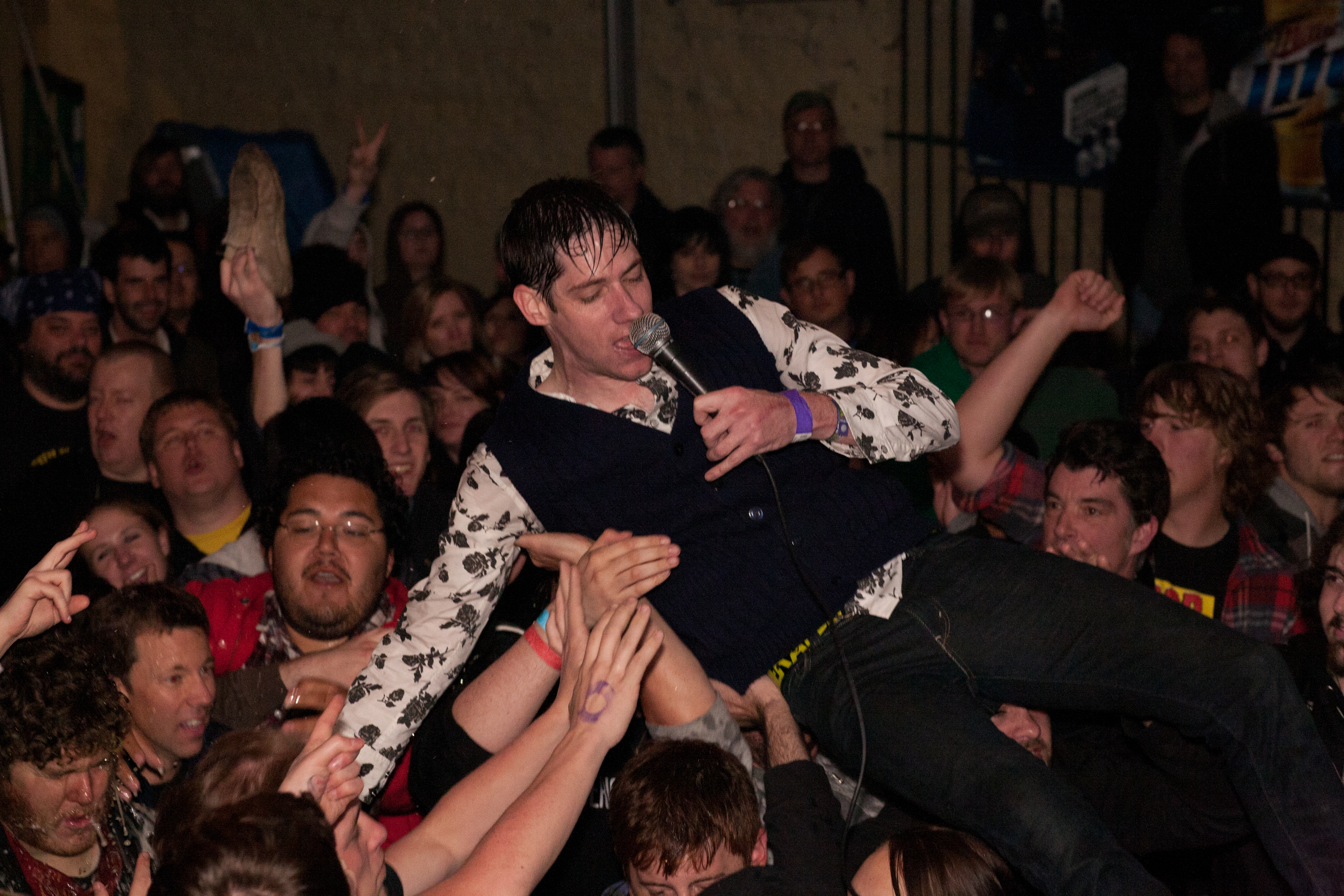
- Wiebe with the Riverboat Gamblers in 2010

Background information
- Born: Denton, Texas, U.S.
- Occupations: Musician; actor; stand-up comedian
- Years active: 1997–present
- Member of: Riverboat Gamblers

Mike Wiebe is a musician, actor, and stand-up comedian from Texas. Originally from Denton, he now lives in Austin. Wiebe is the lead singer of several nationally known Austin-based bands including Drakulas, High Tension Wires, and his most longstanding group, Riverboat Gamblers, with whom he has released six albums since 1997.

Since 2013, his work has also turned increasingly toward comedy, including two works released by comedy label Stand Up! Records.

== Career ==
=== Music ===
Wiebe is known for a high-energy performance style which has led to frequent accidental self-injury, which, in turn, has fed back into his iconic status in Texas punk rock. He suffered a collapsed lung after a crowd-surfing accident in 2016. He once accidentally broke a gas main while swinging from the rafters of a club in Denton, Texas, filling the room with flammable gas.

=== Stand-up comedy ===
Wiebe began performing stand-up in 2011.

In both his music and comedy, Wiebe is given to outlandish theatrics and characters. With comic Avery Moore, Wiebe created a pair of satirical Southern youth group ministers, Dottie and Jefferson-Montclaire McCuewan. Wiebe's character as lead singer of Drakulas, Savage Lord Mic, parodies the postapocalyptic style of 1970s movies like The Warriors.

Wiebe performs on the 2013 Altercation Punk Comedy Tour compilation Hostile Corporate Takeover, produced by Stand Up! Records.

Since 2019, Wiebe has hosted the podcast Contrarian Court with novelist Wayne Gladstone, in which a different unusual opinion such as "bathrobes are stupid" is argued for by each week's guest, with Gladstone and Wiebe acting as opposing counsel and judge.

In 2019, he released the single "I Can't Die," a "theme song" for fellow Austin comic Ryan Cownie's Stand Up! Records album I Can't Die.

Wiebe co-hosted the 2020 Austin Music Industry Awards.

=== Acting ===
Wiebe attended college in Santa Fe, New Mexico, and worked as an actor in both New Mexico and Texas before concentrating on music. His films include the 2001 low-budget indie superhero parody Cornman: American Vegetable Hero and 2003's women-in-prison satire Prison-A-Go-Go!, which he also co-wrote with director Barak Epstein. He has also appeared in several short films.

== Discography ==
- "I Can't Die" b/w "Misspent Youth" flexi-disc single (Stand Up! Records, 2019)
- J.T. Habersaat and the Altercation Punk Comedy Tour (Joe Staats, Mack Lindsay, Billy Milano, and Mike Wiebe), Hostile Corporate Takeover (Stand Up! Records, 2013)
