= Gearhead Records =

American record label

- Founded: 2000
- Founder: Michelle Haunold, Mike LaVella
- Distributor: Burnside
- Genre: Punk, rock
- Country of origin: United States
- Location: Northern California
- Official website: www.gearheadrecords.com

Gearhead Records is an independent record label based in Northern California which grew out of Gearhead magazine.

== Magazine and festivals ==
The organization, originally a magazine, has also hosted festivals. Wrote Exclaim! in 2003:

For a lot of the world Gearhead magazine defined the whole 'hot rod punk rock and roll revolution' back in the 90s championing bands like the Supersuckers and Rocket from the Crypt. Well, this bunch of grease-crazed garage freaks started a record label not so long ago and have also managed to put on rock fests worldwide, and some could argue that the Swedish Gearfest festival turned a lot of ears on to the retro-rock sounds coming out of there [sic] way before a lot of mainstream press was even aware of it all.

Gearfest returned in 2016 with a line up that included The Troublemakers, The Roxy Suicide (featuring Dave Mansfield from the Gearhead band The Mansfields), Red Planet, Pat Todd and the Rank Outsiders and Leesa From the Creamers. The festival was held on September 24th in Sacramento California.

== Artists ==
- "Demons" (Sweden)
- The Dragons (San Diego, CA)
- Electric Eel Shock (Japan)
- Gito Gito Hustler (Japan)
- Hard Feelings (band) (Austin, TX)
- Hellacopters (Sweden)
- Hellbound Glory (Reno, NV)
- The Hives (Sweden)
- Lords of Altamont (Los Angeles, CA)
- The Mansfields (Denver, CO)
- New Bomb Turks (Columbus, OH)
- Red Planet (San Francisco, CA)
- The Riverboat Gamblers (Denton, TX)
- Rock n Roll Soldiers (Eugene, OR)
- Turbo A.C.'s (New York, NY)
- Wildhearts (UK)

== See also ==
- List of record labels
