= Stand Up! Records =

American comedy record label based in Minneapolis

- Founded: 2000; 26 years ago
- Founder: Dan Schlissel
- Genre: Comedy
- Country of origin: U.S.
- Location: Minneapolis, Minnesota
- Official website: standuprecords.com

Stand Up! Records is an American independent comedy record label founded in Minneapolis, Minnesota, by Grammy-winning producer Dan Schlissel. It has been called "the country's most respected indie comedy label." Stand Up! has released more than 200 comedy albums and videos since its founding in 2000, including albums by Lewis Black, Patton Oswalt, Greg Proops, David Cross, Maria Bamford, Hannibal Buress, Judy Gold, the Sklar Brothers, and Eddie Pepitone. Comedian and actor Marc Maron, who released his first three albums on Stand Up!, described Schlissel as "a guy who loves comedy, and is very attentive to the process of recording comedy," and, referencing the large number of noteworthy comics who were given important exposure in their early careers by the label, joked that "you've done everybody's first two records."

A relatively small operation, the label is run almost entirely by Schlissel, who also served as recording engineer and producer on many of the label's albums. The label has been praised for bringing an independent approach to the comedy genre, inspired by Schlissel's roots in punk and indie rock. Henry Owings, founder of humor magazine Chunklet, stated that Schlissel "has done a great job trying to reintroduce some fresh blood into comedy albums. ... If anybody's trying to bring back the idea of comedy albums being something that should be looked at in the same light as a music album, it's him."

== History ==
In the 1990s, Schlissel founded the Lincoln, Nebraska-based -ismist Recordings, which released works by Midwestern punk, metal and alt-rock bands such as Killdozer and House of Large Sizes, including Iowa metal band Slipknot's 1997 debut/demo, Mate.Feed.Kill.Repeat. After Slipknot left -ismist for Roadrunner Records, Schlissel became disillusioned with running a music label, and moved away from Nebraska in 1998 to take a job at a software company in Minneapolis. He considered folding -ismist, but instead found new focus after convincing Lewis Black to work with him after meeting the comedian after a show in Minneapolis.

Schlissel recorded Black's The White Album in Madison, Wisconsin, in 1999, with John Machnik, who would be his production partner for many years. Released on -ismist, the album was an immediate success, eventually selling around 60,000 copies, more than the entire previous -ismist catalog combined. Schlissel reinvented -ismist entirely, moving from punk rock to comedy. The label released several other comedy albums, including two by Doug Stanhope, Sicko and Something to Take the Edge Off, and Jimmy Shubert's Animal Instincts, while Schlissel launched Stand Up! Records in 2000. By 2002, -ismist had effectively closed down and been replaced by Stand Up! Records. Black's next album, the post-9/11 The End of the Universe, sold similarly well.

Even after Black moved to the larger Comedy Central Records label, he continued to work with Schlissel, who produced or edited four more Black albums in the mid-2000s, Rules of Enragement, Luther Burbank Performing Arts Center Blues, The Carnegie Hall Performance, and Anticipation. Of these, Carnegie Hall won a Grammy Award for Best Comedy Album, while Luther Burbank and Anticipation were both nominated in that category. Stand Up! also released the vinyl editions of Luther Burbank Performing Arts Center Blues and Rules of Enragement.

== Notable releases ==
=== Original productions ===
Stand Up!'s original works include:

- Besides Black's White Album, the label also released a 2002 set of White Album outtakes called Revolver (continuing the Beatles title theme), and the 2002 album The End of the Universe.
- Stand Up! released five albums by Doug Stanhope: 2000's Sicko and Something to Take the Edge Off, 2002's Die Laughing, 2007's Deadbeat Hero, and 2009's From Across The Street, as well as the Unbookables' Morbid Obscenity, a 2006 benefit CD led by Stanhope to raise money for fellow comic Arthur Hinty's gastric bypass surgery.
- In addition to re-releasing Maron's debut Not Sold Out, Schlissel recorded and produced Maron's second and third albums, 2006's Tickets Still Available and 2009's Final Engagement, and released a best-of compilation of Maron's podcast WTF with Marc Maron in 2010.
- Schlissel recorded and produced Maria Bamford's first two albums, 2003's The Burning Bridges Tour and 2007's How to WIN!, as well as the 2010 live DVD Plan B.
- Whose Line Is It Anyway? star Greg Proops released two albums on the label in 2007, Houston, We Have a Problem and Joke Book.
- Cheap Seats stars The Sklar Brothers released three albums on the label, 2004's Poppin' the Hood! and the 2011 albums Sklar Maps and Hendersons and Daughters.
- Emmy-winning comic Judy Gold released her 2004 debut album Judith's Roommate Had a Baby on Stand Up!.
- Hannibal Buress's 2010 debut My Name Is Hannibal.
- 2007's Caffeinated, the sole comedy album by Jonathan Katz, star of animated sitcom Dr. Katz, Professional Therapist.

Stand Up! also often partners with comics who have already self-released an album to re-release it in an expanded edition with broader distribution. Examples include Maron's debut Not Sold Out and Pepitone's A Great Stillness.

=== Vinyl and collectors' editions ===
Stand Up! releases albums via digital download and streaming, CD and vinyl. Although vinyl remains a niche market with minimal profit margins compared with digital and streaming, Schlissel told an interviewer for Roctober magazine that he continues to support the format because "the physical product matters. I want me and my artists to have something to hold in hand and say, 'I did this!'" The label's dedication to vinyl has been credited with helping a resurgence in the format; Don Steinberg of the Wall Street Journal stated that Stand Up! has given comedy on vinyl "a hipster comeback," while John Wenzel of Vulture lauded the label for "honoring the history of the format."

The vinyl picture-disc edition of Black's End of the Universe was autographed by Black before manufacturing; his signature is part of the vinyl art, under the grooves. Dana Gould, former co-executive producer of The Simpsons, re-released three discs on vinyl with Stand Up!: Funhouse, Let Me Put My Thoughts in You and I Know It's Wrong. For the 2009 re-release of Funhouse, the label also made an 8-track tape version as well as CD and vinyl.

Stand Up! often works with larger labels to co-release collector's-edition vinyl versions of a comic's album. Besides the two Lewis Black albums, Stand Up! also released LPs of David Cross's Grammy-nominated 2002 album Shut Up You Fucking Baby and the subsequent It's Not Funny and ...America...Great..., as well as Patton Oswalt's Feelin' Kinda Patton and Werewolves and Lollipops, Hannibal Buress' Animal Furnace, and Kyle Kinane's Death of the Party. In 2015, the label re-released Joan Rivers' groundbreaking 1968 The Next To Last Joan Rivers Album for Record Store Day; it had long been out of print.

== Philosophy and approach to comedy ==
The name "Stand Up!" was chosen not only for its obvious connection with stand-up comedy, but for its association with free-thinking and revolutionary ideals, as in the Bob Marley song "Get Up, Stand Up" and the intellectually confrontational comedic approach of George Carlin, Lenny Bruce and Joan Rivers. The label's logo, a clenched fist holding a microphone aloft, was designed by street artist and activist Shepard Fairey in 2002.

Rather than sticking to a single style of comedy, Stand Up! maintains a diverse set of styles and viewpoints among its artists. Political material on the label ranges from libertarian Tim Slagle to moderate Will Durst to the left-leaning Black and Maron.

Reflecting the label's interest in edgy, punk-inflected comedy and Schlissel's roots in indie rock, Stand Up! often works with visual artists who share that sensibility, such as Fairey and Frank Kozik. MAD magazine cartoonists Jack Davis and Mort Drucker drew the covers for albums by Tim Slagle and Dwight York, while Raymond Pettibon, the iconic punk artist who created many of Black Flag's album covers, drew the cover for J.T. Habersaat's Hostile Corporate Takeover. Derek Riggs, who designed Iron Maiden's albums, did the cover for Glenn Wool's No Land's Man. Wendy Pini, creator of the Elfquest comic-book series, illustrated the cover of Keith Lowell Jensen's album Elf Orgy. Cartoonist Drew Friedman illustrated the 2014 vinyl edition of Eddie Pepitone's A Great Stillness. Pia Guerra, Eisner Award-winning co-creator of Y: The Last Man, drew the cover for Ray Harrington's 2017 album Overwhelmed.

== Ties with Minneapolis and Austin ==
In addition to its roster of nationally known comedians, the label also has particularly strong ties with the regional comedy scenes in Minneapolis-St. Paul and Austin, Texas. Minnesotan comics on the label include Bamford, Chad Daniels, Mary Mack, Tim Harmston, Chris Maddock, "Fancy Ray" McCloney, Corey Adam, and Rich Kronfeld of Comedy Central's Let's Bowl. Stand Up! has also released two DVDs of the Twin Cities public-access cable series Drinking With Ian. In Austin, the label has put on multiple showcases at the annual SXSW festival, and has produced albums by Austin comedians including Andy Ritchie, David Huntsberger, J.T. Habersaat, John Tole, Doug Mellard, and Ryan Cownie. In 2019, Stand Up! released the posthumous album by Austin's Lashonda Lester, Shondee Superstar, which was praised by Paste magazine as "a lovely introduction to a voice that's both purely unique and universally relatable ... If the world is only lucky enough to have one album from Lester, it's a blessing that it's a recording of a complete show."

== Other works ==
=== Roku channel ===
Stand Up! has a streaming channel available on Roku featuring new and archival comedy videos and podcasts.

=== Akumal Comedy Festival ===
From 2012 to 2015, Stand Up! hosted the annual Akumal Comedy Festival in Mexico, a nonprofit event held in Tulum, Playa del Carmen, and Akumal which raised money for the Mexican Red Cross. The festival featured comics performing in both English and Spanish. Headliners included Darryl Lenox, Maggie Faris, and Derek Sheen. The festival was co-founded by Schlissel and Twin Cities comic Gus Lynch, who also acted in the films Saving Silverman, North Country, and I Spy. Lynch died after an accidental fall in Akumal in 2014; the final festival was held in his honor.

=== Scottish tartan ===
In 2017, during the label's first visit to the Edinburgh Fringe Festival, Schlissel registered a Scottish tartan with the National Records of Scotland in the name of Stand Up! Records. Designed by Edinburgh kiltmaker Gordon Nicolson, the tartan blends the colors red, black, and tan (from Fairey's Stand Up! Records logo), blue (from the Israeli flag, symbolizing Schlissel's Jewish heritage), and silver-grey (for -ismist Recordings' 25th anniversary).

== Discography ==
All releases from 2000 and 2001 were originally issued by -ismist Recordings, the predecessor to Stand Up! Records. When the titles were repressed, starting in early 2002, the branding was switched to the Stand Up! Records imprint. All titles from 2002 onward were originally issued by Stand Up! Records, unless under license from another label, or bringing an out of print release back into print.

=== 2000 ===
- SUR 001 - Lewis Black - The White Album (CD, vinyl LP)
- SUR 002 - Doug Stanhope - Sicko
- SUR 003 - Doug Stanhope - Something to Take the Edge Off (CD, vinyl LP)

=== 2001 ===
- SUR 004 - Jimmy Shubert - Animal Instincts

=== 2002 ===
- SUR 005 - Lewis Black - Revolver (5" CD EP, 10-inch vinyl EP, including Mini CD EP)
- SUR 006 - Lewis Black - The End of the Universe (CD, vinyl picture disc)
- SUR 007 - Doug Stanhope - Die Laughing
- SUR 008 - Rich Kronfeld - Factory Accident Sex (DVD)
- SUR 009 - David Cross - Shut Up, You Fucking Baby! (triple vinyl LP)

=== 2003 ===
- SUR 010 - René Hicks - Let's Roll
- SUR 011 - Maria Bamford - The Burning Bridges Tour

=== 2004 ===
- SUR 012 - The Sklar Brothers - Poppin' the Hood!
- SUR 013 - John Bowman - In Stink
- SUR 014 - David Cross - It's Not Funny (vinyl LP only)
- SUR 015 - Judy Gold - Judith's Roommate Had a Baby
- SUR 016 - Lewis Black - Rules of Enragement (vinyl LP only)

=== 2005 ===
- SUR 017 - Marc Maron - Not Sold Out
- SUR 018 - Jimmy Shubert - Pandemonium
- SUR 019 - Tom Rhodes - Hot Sweet Ass

=== 2006 ===
- SUR 020 - Andy Andrist - Dumb it Down for the Masses
- SUR 021 - Marc Maron - Tickets Still Available
- SUR 022 - Lewis Black - Luther Burbank Performing Arts Center Blues (vinyl LP only)
- SUR 023 - Tom Rhodes - Live in Paris
- SUR 024 - The Unbookables - Morbid Obscenity
- SUR 025 - Sean Rouse - Something to Sell at Edinburgh
- SUR 026 - Tim Slagle - Europa

=== 2007 ===
- SUR 027 - Jonathan Katz - Caffeinated
- SUR 028 - Greg Proops - Houston, We Have a Problem
- SUR 029 - Maria Bamford - How to WIN!
- SUR 030 - Drinking with Ian - Season One (DVD)
- SUR 031 - Doug Stanhope - Deadbeat Hero (CD/DVD)
- SUR 032 - Greg Proops - Joke Book
- SUR 033 - Sean Rouse - Spilled Milk
- SUR 034 - Jim David - Eat Here and Get Gas

=== 2008 ===
- SUR 035 - Patton Oswalt - Feelin' Kinda Patton (vinyl LP only)
- SUR 036 - Rick Shapiro - Unconditional Love
- SUR 037 - Jim David - Live from Jimville
- SUR 041 - Jamie Kilstein - Please Buy My Jokes

=== 2009 ===
- SUR 038 - Dwight Slade - Evil Monkey
- SUR 039 - Chad Daniels - Busy Being Awesome
- SUR 040 - Jimmy Shubert - Alive & Kickin' (DVD/CD)
- SUR 042 - Dan Naturman - Get Off My Property
- SUR 043 - Matt Kirshen - I Guess We'll Never Know
- SUR 044 - Marc Maron - Final Engagement (double CD)
- SUR 045 - Dylan Brody - Brevity
- SUR 046 - Al Madrigal - Half Breed
- SUR 047 - Dylan Brody - True Enough
- SUR 049 - Danny Bevins - A Different Kind of Bad
- SUR 050 - Chris Porter - Screaming from the Cosmos (DVD/CD, open reel tape)
- SUR 051 - Dwight York - Quickies
- SUR 052 - Dana Gould - Funhouse (CD, vinyl LP & 8-track, open reel tape)
- SUR 053 - Jamie Kilstein - Zombie Jesus
- SUR 054 - Drinking with Ian - Season Two (DVD)
- SUR 055 - Doug Stanhope - From Across The Street (CD, vinyl LP)

=== 2010 ===
- SUR 056 - Patton Oswalt - Werewolves and Lollipops (vinyl LP + DVD only)
- SUR 057 - Maria Bamford - Plan B (DVD)
- SUR 058 - Pete Lee - Gas Money
- SUR 059 - Jim David - Notorious F.A.G.
- SUR 060 - Will Durst - Raging Moderate
- SUR 061 - Glenn Wool - Let Your Hands Go (CD/DVD)
- SUR 062 - Jackie Kashian - It is Never Going to be Bread
- SUR 063 - WTF with Marc Maron - Best of WTF, Vol. 1
- SUR 064 - Mike DeStefano - OK Karma
- SUR 065 - Hannibal Buress - My Name is Hannibal

=== 2011 ===
- SUR 066 - Mike Stanley - Tough Luck Chump (CD/DVD)
- SUR 068 - The Sklar Brothers - Sklar Maps
- SUR 069 - Melinda Hill - The Accidental Bisexual
- SUR 070 - Dylan Brody - A Twist of the Wit
- SUR 071 - Erik Allen - This is All I Have Right Now
- SUR 072 - Lee Camp - Chaos for the Weary
- SUR 073 - Andy Ritchie - King Ding-A-Ling
- SUR 074 - David Huntsberger - Humanitis
- SUR 076 - Dave Waite - Kaboom
- SUR 077 - Various Artists - Nerd Alert! (CD and double LP)
- SUR 078 - Jamie Kilstein - Libel, Slander & Sedition
- SUR 079 - The Sklar Brothers - Hendersons and Daughters
- SUR 080 - Rory Scovel - Dilation
- SUR 081 - Tommy Ryman - Bath Time with Tommy Ryman

=== 2012 ===
- SUR 082 - Eddie Gossling - Fresh Brewed Eddie (CD/DVD)
- SUR 083 - Alysia Wood - Princess (CD)
- SUR 084 - Dylan Brody - Chronological Disorder (CD)
- SUR 085 - Kyle Kinane - Death of the Party (vinyl LP only)
- SUR 086 - Robert Kelly - Live (CD)
- SUR 087 - Rick Shapiro - Catalyst for Change (CD)
- SUR 088 - Chris Maddock - Point of Entry (CD/DVD)
- SUR 089 - Hannibal Buress - Animal Furnace (vinyl LP only)
- SUR 090 - Various Artists - Comedy Juice All-Stars (CD)
- SUR 091 - Lee Camp - Pepper Spray the Tears Away (CD)
- SUR 092 - Chad Daniels - You're the Best (CD)
- SUR 093 - Dave Williamson - Thicker than Water (CD)
- SUR 094 - Glenn Wool - I'll Ask Her (CD/DVD)
- SUR 095 - Valley Meadows - Valley Meadows (CD)
- SUR 096 - Erik Allen - Your Feature Performer is Wasted (CD)
- SUR 097 - Ryan Singer - Comedy Wonder Town (CD)
- SUR 098 - Darryl Lenox - Blind Ambition (CD, digital special)
- SUR 099 - Ian Bagg - It Takes A Village (CD)

=== 2013 ===
- SUR 075 - Various Artists - The $4.99 Show (The $9.99 Recording) (CD)
- SUR 100 - Geoff Tate - I Got Potential (CD)
- SUR 101 - Ryan Stout - Touché (vinyl format only)
- SUR 102 - Keith Lowell Jensen - Elf Orgy (CD)
- SUR 103 - Ray Harrington - The Worst Is Over (CD)
- SUR 104 - JT Habersaat & The Altercation Punk Comedy Tour - Hostile Corporate Takeover (vinyl LP)
- SUR 105 - Dave Fulton - ...based on a true story (CD)
- SUR 106 - Dylan Brody - Writ Large (CD)
- SUR 107 - Brendon Burns - Pompously Lectures Americans (CD)
- SUR 108 - David Huntsberger - Explosion Land (CD)
- SUR 109 - Danny Lobell - Some Kind of Comedian (CD, vinyl LP)
- SUR 110 - Ari Shaffir - Revenge for the Holocaust (vinyl LP only)
- SUR 111 - Jerry Rocha - Take That, Real Dad (CD)
- SUR 112 - Paul Varghese - Paul & Oates (CD)
- SUR 113 - Melinda Hill - Six Ways to Bomb on America's Got Talent (digital single)
- SUR 114 - John Tole - Reign in Laughs (CD)
- SUR 115 - Paul Hooper - Tense & Uncomfortable (CD)
- SUR 116 - Jamie Kilstein - What Alive People Do (CD)
- SUR 117 - Dave Mordal - (pronounced dāv mȯr-däl) (CD)
- SUR 118 - Tracey Ashley - Two First Names (CD)
- SUR 120 - Will Durst - Elect to Laugh (CD)

=== 2014 ===
- SUR 121 - Tim Harmston - The Most Bees Ever (CD)
- SUR 122 - Eddie Pepitone - A Great Stillness (CD, vinyl LP)
- SUR 123 - Various Artists - The Texas Mess (Cassette)
- SUR 124 - Chad Daniels - As Is (digital special)
- SUR 126 - Jackie Kashian - This Will Make an Excellent Horcrux (CD)
- SUR 127 - Bengt Washburn - Bengt Over in Europe (CD)
- SUR 128 - Chad Daniels - Natural Selection (CD)
- SUR 129 - Cy Amundson - Lovesick in Toledo (CD)
- SUR 130 - Various Artists - 420 Friendly Comedy Special (digital album)
- SUR 131 - Adam Quesnell - Can We Afford This Much Despair? (CD)
- SUR 132 - Courtney McClean & the Dirty Curls - This One's for Dad (CD)
- SUR 133 - Tim Slagle - Evolution: The Best of Slagle vol. 1 (digital album)
- SUR 134 - Geoff Tate - Just Another Clown (CD)
- SUR 135 - Dana Gould - Let Me Put My Thoughts in You (CD, vinyl LP)
- SUR 136 - Dave Waite - Hotdoggin′ (CD)
- SUR 137 - Matt Fugate - Believement (CD)
- SUR 138 - Jake Flores - Humours (digital album & digital special)
- SUR 139 - Johnny Taylor - Tangled Up in Plaid (CD)
- SUR 140 - Tony Sam - Scaredy Cat (CD)
- SUR 141 - Ryan Dalton - I'm Married, Let Me Tell You About It (CD)
- SUR 142 - Glenn Wool - No Land's Man (CD)
- SUR 143 - Keith Lowell Jensen - Atheist Christmas (CD/DVD)

=== 2015 ===
- SUR 144 - Corey Adam - No Joke (CD)
- SUR 145 - David Heti - It was OK, an Album of Comedy by David Heti (CD/DVD)
- SUR 146 - Various Artists - Home of the Good Laugh (CD)
- SUR 147 - Doug Mellard - Fart Safari (CD)
- SUR 148 - Adam Newman - Killed (vinyl LP)
- SUR 149 - Mary Mack - Pig Woman (CD)
- SUR 150 - Joan Rivers - The Next to Last Joan Rivers Album (Record Store Day exclusive CD)
- SUR 152 - Maggie Faris - Hot Lesbo Action (CD)
- SUR 153 - David Huntsberger - One-Headed Beast (digital album)
- SUR 154 - Mikey Manker - Voyageur (digital album)
- SUR 155 - Jim David - Hard to Swallow (CD)
- SUR 156 - Ryan Singer - Immortal for Now (CD)

=== 2016 ===
- SUR 157 - Patrick Susmilch - Validate Me (CD)
- SUR 158 - JJ Whitehead - Fool Disclosure (LP, digital album)
- SUR 159 - Derek Sheen - Tiny Idiot (LP, CD, digital special)
- SUR 160 - Darlene Westgor - Boxed Wine (CD)
- SUR 161 - Mike Stanley - Shiner (LP, CD/DVD, digital special)
- SUR 162 - Be a Man (DVD, digital special)
- SUR 163 - The Drug Budget and Robert Fones - Feel Real Fear (split CD)
- SUR 164 - Aaron Aryanpur - In Spite Of (CD)
- SUR 165 - JT Habersaat - Misanthrope (CD/DVD)
- SUR 166 - Mike DeStefano - Puppies & Heroin (digital album)

=== 2017 ===
- SUR 119 - Derek Sheen - Holy Drivel (picture disc LP, digital album, digital special)
- SUR 167 - Dana Gould - I Know It's Wrong (LP)
- SUR 168 - Jenny Zigrino - JZ's New Album (LP)
- SUR 169 - Johnny Taylor - Trump. Sugar. Sux. Tragic. (digital single)
- SUR 170 - Jackie Kashian - I Am Not the Hero of This Story (CD)
- SUR 171 - Steve Gillespie - Alive on State (CD)
- SUR 172 - Robert Baril - Sex & Politics (CD, digital special)
- SUR 173 - Mishka Shubaly vs. JT Habersaat - Into the Wilderness (10-inch EP)
- SUR 174 - Sid Singh - Amazing! (Probably) (digital album)
- SUR 175 - Danny Lobell - The Nicest Boy in Barcelona (CD)
- SUR 176 - Ray Harrington - Overwhelmed (CD)
- SUR 178 - Jason Dudey - Exceeding All Expectations (CD, digital album)
- SUR 179 - Chris Porter - Lost & Alone (vinyl LP, digital album)
- SUR 180 - Derek Sheen - Disasterbation (digital album, digital special)
- SUR 181 - Glenn Wool - This Road Has Tolls (digital album)

=== 2018 ===
- SUR 182 - Tommy Ryman - Having the Time of My Life (CD)
- SUR 184 - Corey Adam - Jokes (CD, digital special)
- SUR 185 - David Heti - And You Will Regret It (digital album and special)
- SUR 186 - Keith Lowell Jensen - Bad Comedy for Bad People (CD/DVD)
- SUR 187 - Ross Bennett - ...Not if You Were the Last Man on Earth! (CD)
- SUR 188 - Adam Quesnell - Egghead (7-inch EP, digital special)
- SUR 189 - David Cross - ...America...Great... (LP)
- SUR 190 - Dwight York - Belongs in a Bar (digital album and special)
- SUR 191 - Kristine Levine - Hey, Sailor! (CD)
- SUR 192 - Daniel Humbarger - Funny Bones (cassette)
- SUR 193 - Aaron Aryanpur - Employee of the Day (digital album)
- SUR 194 - Doug Mellard - Fart Safari 2: Fart Harder (digital album, digital special)
- SUR 195 - Adam Quesnell - Despair II: Social Justice Warlord (CD, digital special)
- SUR 196 - Johnny Taylor - Bummin' with the Devil (CD/DVD, digital special)

=== 2019 ===
- SUR 197 - Mike Bocchetti - Thank You! (digital album)
- SUR 198 - Jimmy Shubert - Zero Tolerance (digital album, digital special)
- SUR 199 - Ryan Cownie - I Can't Die (digital album, digital special)
- SUR 200 - Lashonda Lester - Shondee Superstar (CD/DVD, digital album, digital special)
- SUR 201 - Mike Wiebe - I Can't Die (flexi disc)
- SUR 202 - Corey Adam - No Joke 2 (CD, digital album)
- SUR 203 - Kathleen McGee - Deliciously Vulgar (digital album)
- SUR 204 - Glenn Wool - Creator, I Am But a Pawn (digital album, digital special)
- SUR 205 - Whitney Chitwood - The Bakery Case (CD, digital album)
- SUR 206 - Jay Chanoine - The Texas Chanoinesaw Massacre (digital album)
- SUR 207 - Robert Baril - TMI (CD/DVD, digital album, digital special)
- SUR 208 - Dylan Mandlsohn - A Date with the Devil (digital album)
- SUR 209 - Dave Williamson - Trying My Hardest (CD/DVD, digital album, digital special)

=== 2020 ===
- SUR 210 - Fancy Ray McCloney - The Best Lookin' Man in Comedy (LP, digital album)
- SUR 211 - Amber Preston - Sparkly Parts (digital album)
- SUR 212 - Derek Sheen - Macho Caballero (digital album, digital special)
- SUR 213 - Tim Harmston - The Whim of Tim (digital album, digital special)
- SUR 214 - Dante Powell - The Squirrels Get Fat (digital album, digital special)
- SUR 215 - Wendy Maybury - She's Not From Around Here (digital album)
- SUR 216 - Bil Dwyer - Am I Yelling? (CD, digital album)
- SUR 217 - Kelly Pryce - Life with a Pryce (digital album)
- SUR 218 - Glenn Wool - Viva Forever (digital album, digital special)
- SUR 220 - The Firesign Theatre - Dope Humor of the Seventies (2×LP, digital album)
- SUR 221 - Chris Maddock - Country Music Legend (digital album, digital special)
- SUR 222 - The Snaildartha6 with George Cartwright - Snaildartha: The Story of Jerry the Christmas Snail (digital album)
- SUR 223 - Doug Mellard - Fart Safari 3: Fart Hard with a Vengeance (digital album, digital special)
- SUR 224 - Luiki Wiki - #StandupConMadre (digital album, digital special)

=== 2021 ===
- SUR 219 - Chris Knutson - Rewound (digital album, digital special, VHS)
- SUR 225 - Cliff Cash - Half Way There (digital album, digital special)
- SUR 226 - Mike Lebovitz - Two Slob Household (digital album, digital special)
- SUR 227 - Jim David - Gay Jokes for Straight Cruisers (digital album)
- SUR 228 - Dave Losso - A Careless Whisper of a Man (CD, digital album, digital special)
- SUR 229 - Kyle Kinane/The Slow Death - Under the Table #2 (7-inch vinyl, digital single)
- SUR 231 - Mike Wiebe - The Scary Stuff (flexi disc)
- SUR 232 - Doug Mellard - I'm Worried About Me (digital album, digital special)
- SUR 233 - Jake Flores - Bad Omen (digital album, digital special)
- SUR 234 - Darryl Lenox - Super Bloom (digital album)
- SUR 235 - Arnor Dadi - Big, Small Town Kid (digital album, digital special)
- SUR 236 - Awesome Snakes - Venom (CD, LP, digital album)

=== 2022 ===
- SUR 237 - Mo Alexander - Possum Blues (original mix) (7” lathe-cut picture disc)
- SUR 241 - Mo Alexander - Mo’ Possum Blues (digital album, digital special)
- SUR 242 - Mike Wiebe - Worried About Me (flexi disc)
- SUR 243 - Auggie Smith - Cult Following (digital album)
- SUR 244 - Josh Blue - Broccoli (digital album)
- SUR 247 - Auggie Smith - Smell the Thunder (digital album)

=== 2023 ===
- SUR 238 - Richard Pryor - Richard Pryor (deluxe vinyl double album)
- SUR 239 - Richard Pryor - Craps (After Hours) (deluxe vinyl double album)
- SUR 240 - Richard Pryor - Live At The Comedy Store, 1973 (deluxe vinyl double album)
- SUR 245 - Sam Miller - Round Trip (digital album, digital special, CD/DVD, vinyl LP)
- SUR 246 - Bill Young - Eat the Cake! (digital album)
- SUR 248 - Glenn Wool - Tiny Kings of Winter (digital album, digital special)
- SUR 249 - Tim Slagle - Bachelorette Party (digital album, digital special)
- SUR 251 - Auggie Smith - Taste the Lightning (digital album)

=== 2024 ===
- SUR 250 - Marc Maron, Maria Bamford, Hannibal Buress, Chad Daniels, and Lashonda Lester - The Headliners (vinyl box set)
- SUR 252 - Tom Lehrer - (I'm Spending) Hanukkah in Santa Monica b/w A Christmas Carol (7" single)
- SUR 253 - Lou Moon - Lou (CD, digital album)
- SUR 255 - Sam Miller - Triple Banger (lathe-cut 8" single)

=== 2025 ===
- SUR 254 - Dick Davy - Presenting… Dick Davy (LP, digital album)
- SUR 256 - Tony Camin - A Ass Pocket of Whimsy (digital album, digital special)
- SUR 257 - Jay Chanoine - Chanoinigans (digital album, digital special)

=== 2026 ===
- SUR 258 - Jimmy Shubert - Clown Shoes (digital album)
- SUR 259 - Colton Dowling - My Hole Album (digital album)

== See also ==
- List of record labels
- Comedy Central Records
