= Chanoine (surname) =

Chanoine is a surname. Notable people with the surname include:

- Charles Chanoine (1835–1915), French military officer
- Jay Chanoine (born 1985/86), American stand-up comedian
- Roger Chanoine (1976–2016), American football player
