= Corey Adam =

American stand-up comedian

- Born: Corey Adam Allegrezza; 1980 or 1981 (age 45–46); Hibbing, Minnesota
- Occupation: Stand-up comedian
- Years active: 2008–present
- Website: coreyadamwastaken.com

Corey Adam is an American stand-up comedian from Minneapolis, Minnesota. He has released three comedy albums on Stand Up! Records, including 2018's Jokes.

== Personal life ==
Adam was born Corey Adam Allegrezza in Hibbing, Minnesota. Adam began using his first and middle names as a stage name in 2008 because of his frustration with frequent mispronunciations of "Allegrezza."

== Career ==
=== Stand-up comedy ===
Adam's comedy has been described as "self-deprecating and sarcastic." Adam's early comedy was influenced by Sam Kinison; he studied group improv comedy at venues such as Brave New Workshop in Minneapolis, but eventually decided solo stand-up was more suited to his style. He moved briefly to Las Vegas at age 22 to further his stand-up career, but has been based in the Twin Cities until 2021, when he moved to Austin, Texas.

Adam has toured internationally, performing to audiences in Ireland and at the Akumal Comedy Festival in Mexico, and has been a frequent tour opener for Nick Swardson. He has been a regular host of comedy nights at several clubs in Minneapolis.

Adam has released three albums of his stand-up comedy. Two of these, No Joke and No Joke 2, are nontraditional sets capturing not his actual stage performance but his interactions with audiences and hecklers. Originally self-funded through crowdsourcing, No Joke was later picked up by Grammy-winning producer Dan Schlissel of Stand Up! Records, who produced his subsequent works. Richard Lanoie of The Serious Comedy Site praised 2018's Jokes for its "adult sense of humor and a taste for the absurd."

=== Radio and podcasts ===
He was a regular co-host on the Steel Toe Morning Show on Youtube.com out of St. Cloud, Minnesota, and has been a frequent guest on the sports talk show SKOR North Live on KSTP-AM, Laughing Matters with Robert Baril on KTNF-AM, and the WFTC-TV pop-culture show On the Fly with Tony Fly.

In 2019–20, he co-hosted the podcast Unregulated Radio. In 2012–2013, Adam co-hosted Dirty Bomb Shop, a podcast about the craft of stand-up comedy.

== Discography ==
- No Joke (Stand Up! Records, 2015)
- Jokes (Stand Up! Records, 2018)
- No Joke 2 (Stand Up! Records, 2019)
