= Dwight York (comedian) =

American stand-up comedian (born 1960/61)

- Born: 1960 or 1961 (age 64–65); Amery, Wisconsin, U.S.
- Occupation: Stand-up comedian
- Years active: 1989-present
- Website: dwightyork.com

Dwight York is an American stand-up comedian and writer originally from Wisconsin.

York has released two albums on Stand Up! Records, most recently Belongs In a Bar. Both Laughspin and The Serious Comedy Site called his album Quickies one of the best comedy albums of 2009.

== Early life ==
York was born in Amery, Wisconsin, and graduated from Amery High School in 1980. In contrast to the "drifter" persona he puts on when performing comedy, York has said his "family was normal, small-town, churchgoing. They're not crazy." Before becoming a comedian, York worked at a Minnesota factory building windows on an assembly line.

== Career ==
=== Stand-up comedy ===
York performed at his first comedy open mic in Minneapolis in February 1989, after crafting his idiosyncratic performance style beforehand by studying other stand-up comics for nine months by going to shows every night, observing and taking notes.

He is known for a comedic style that centers on a relentless barrage of finely honed, sometimes bizarre absurdist one-liners, delivered in character as a possibly psychopathic wild man, described by the Eau Claire Leader-Telegram as "drugged, crazed, and criminal." He has been compared with Steven Wright, Mitch Hedberg, George Carlin, Emo Philips, and Bobcat Goldthwait.

York has performed across the United States. York finished in second place at the 1995 Vail National Comedy Invitational in Colorado. He was a semifinalist at the San Francisco International Stand-Up Comedy Competition in 1996 and 1997. He was a semifinalist at the 2009 Great American Comedy Festival. He finished second at the Laughlin Laugh Fest in Laughlin, Nevada in 2014. He performs annually at the Buffalo Chip Campground during the Sturgis Motorcycle Rally, and has performed at the Harley-Davidson 100th anniversary celebration in Milwaukee, the Edinburgh Fringe, and Chicago Comedy Festival.

He became a frequent guest on nationally syndicated radio program The Bob & Tom Show, and appears on their 2000 compilation CD You Guys Rock. Colin Quinn has called him his favorite underrated comedian.

=== Albums ===
York has released two albums on Stand Up! Records.

Belongs In a Bar was recorded live in River Falls, Wisconsin. It was first released as a video in 2018, and later as an audio album in 2021. Reviewer Richard Lanoie of The Serious Comedy Site called the album "brilliant", with jokes that "line up like dominoes."

2009's Quickies was recorded live in Appleton, Wisconsin, and features cover art by MAD magazine cartoonist Mort Drucker. Minneapolis newspaper City Pages called it "as densely packed with jokes as a disc can get." Lanoie of The Serious Comedy Site named Quickies one of his top 10 comedy alums of 2009, as did John Celery of Laughspin, who called York "as inventive as he is suggestive". Jake Austen of Roctober magazine called York's "maximum laughs-per-minute" approach "comedy gold."

=== Other work ===
York has written several books. The Vile File: Jokes Too Sick For the Stage and its followup More from the Vile File: 500 Sick Jokes compile one-liners from across his career as a comedian.

He also published a semi-autobiographical comic novel in 2019, What Luck, about a stand-up comedian wrestling with the difficulties of finding a "lucky break".

York has also been published in Reader's Digest.

== Discography ==
- Dwight York, Belongs In a Bar (Stand Up! Records, 2018)
- Dwight York, Quickies (Stand Up! Records, 2009)
- Dwight York, Psychotic Criminal Comic (Comedy Gallery, 1996)

== Books ==
- What Luck (2019)
- More from the Vile File: 500 Sick Jokes (-ismist Recordings, 2012)
- The Vile File: Jokes Too Sick for the Stage (Trailer House Press, 1999)
