= Bill Young (comedian) =

American stand-up comedian (died 2014)

- Born: William C. Young
- Died: December 12, 2014 (age 32); Minneapolis, Minnesota
- Occupation: Stand-up comic
- Years active: 2000–2014

William C. Young (died December 12, 2014) was an American stand-up comedian from Minneapolis, Minnesota. Young appeared on three comedy albums released by Stand Up! Records, including the posthumous career retrospective Eat the Cake!, released in 2023.

== Career ==
Young began performing comedy in 2000. He considered himself a story-oriented comedian, as opposed to one-liners. Andrew Cahak, host of the podcast Dogbrain, called him "a strict adherent to silliness in all its forms." Patrick Strait of City Pages called him "one of the most consistently funny and compassionate members of the (Twin Cities) standup scene." Writing for Laughspin, Mike Brody said that Young's "ability to make a spine-tinglingly funny comment at any moment defined him."

He was a regular headliner at the weekly Monday Night Comedy Show at Spring Street Tavern. Young also performed at the Akumal Comedy Festival, CONvergence convention, as part of the duo Denson & Young, and at Stand Up! Records-affiliated shows such as Drinking With Ian and The $4.99 Show. He opened for Paul F. Tompkins. He performed frequently at the annual 10,000 Laughs Comedy Festival.

Young was also involved in live theater and film. He co-wrote, co-directed and starred in the play Hermann the German: The Scandal that Rocked New Ulm!, a comedy based on the real-life attempt by the city of New Ulm, Minnesota to boost tourism by creating a fictitious legend about a giant cement footprint supposedly made by the legendary figure Hermann the German. The play was first staged as part of the 2014 Minnesota Fringe Festival, then ran at the New Ulm Actors Community Theatre later that year. Young also acted in the short film Birthmarked For Death, which won five awards including Best Film at the Minneapolis 48-Hour Film Festival and screened later at the 2008 Cannes Film Festival in France. He performed in Actors Theater's Comedy Roast of Mr. Scrooge in 2012.

In 2010, Minneapolis rock band Paste? paid tribute to him with his own theme song, "Local Comedian Bill Young".

=== Recordings ===
Young appeared on three comedy albums released by Stand Up! Records. Two were compilations. 2011's Nerd Alert! chronicled two evenings at the stand-up series Monday Night Comedy Show in Minneapolis. 2013's The $4.99 Show (The $9.99 Recording) documented a series of shows at the Triple Rock Social Club, featuring Young as headliner and other Twin Cities comics including Gus Lynch and Chris Maddock.

Young had been planning to record a full-length album with Stand Up! Records producer Dan Schlissel before his unexpected death. In 2023, Schlissel released a posthumous collection of Young's recorded work, Eat the Cake! It was compiled from Young's appearances on the $4.99 Show and Nerd Alert discs, as well as material recorded at Akumal, Grumpy's Death Comedy Jam, and Club Underground's Best Comedy Show Ever. The album reached No. 2 on the iTunes and Amazon comedy charts the week it debuted. Richard Lanoie of the Serious Comedy Site called the album "excellent and slightly dark ... If you are going to leave something behind, this album is a big something." Writing for the website MN Comedy, Patrick Strait called the album "as funny and dark and bonkers as Young was."

== Personal life ==
Young attended Tartan Senior High School in Oakdale, Minnesota. He had a brother and sister. He was married to Jena Young, another Minneapolis comic; they later divorced.

== Death ==
Young died in his sleep on December 12, 2014, at his home in Minneapolis. He was 32. At his funeral, he was given a 21-Nerf gun salute.

Young's died only two weeks after Gus Lynch, another important figure in the Minneapolis comedy scene, and both received widespread accolades from local comedians after their deaths.

== Discography ==
- Eat the Cake! (Stand Up! Records, 2023)
- Various artists, The $4.99 Show (The $9.99 Recording) (Stand Up! Records, 2013)
- Various artists, Nerd Alert! (Stand Up! Records, 2011)

== Selected podcast appearances ==
- Dogbrain with Andrew Cahak, Episode 16 (March 30, 2014)
- Apropos of Nothing, multiple episodes
- Waiting For the Pizza, multiple episodes
- How Bad Cast, April 21, 2013
