= Michael Moore Hates America =

- Theatrical release poster
- Directed by: Michael Wilson
- Written by: Michael Wilson
- Produced by: Carr Hagerman; Christopher Ohlsen; Curt Johnson; Michael Wilson
- Starring: Andrew Breitbart; Peter Damon; Dinesh D'Souza; Penn Jillette; Sandra Froman; Michael Moore; Michael Wilson
- Narrated by: Michael Wilson
- Cinematography: Carr Hagerman; Christopher Ohlsen; Michael Wilson
- Edited by: Greg Browning
- Distributed by: HCW Films
- Release date: September 12, 2004
- Running time: 125 minutes
- Country: United States
- Language: English

Michael Moore Hates America is a documentary film directed by Michael Wilson that criticizes the work of film director Michael Moore.

It premiered September 12, 2004, in Dallas, Texas, at the American Film Renaissance film festival.

== Overview ==
The film and its poster are patterned after Moore's film Roger & Me, during which Moore attempts to chase down Roger Bonham Smith for an interview. In this case, Wilson seeks an interview with Moore. Wilson also adopts other aspects of Moore's style in his efforts at satirizing Moore. For instance, Wilson interviews a mix of Americans across the country and well-known figures like conservatives Dinesh D'Souza, David Horowitz and Andrew Breitbart, liberal Albert Maysles and fellow libertarians such as Penn Jillette and Tim Slagle. Wilson revisits some of Moore's shooting locations and subjects from Roger & Me and Bowling for Columbine, and criticizes many aspects of Moore's films by alleging they include fabrications and misrepresentations. For example, a scene from the Moore film Bowling for Columbine depicting the NRA as callous and uncaring about victims of shootings is criticized by Wilson. Wilson also criticizes a scene in Columbine in which Moore enters a bank in Traverse City, Michigan, and walks out with a gun that he received as a perk for opening a deposit account. Wilson asserts that this scene is fabrication, and that Michael Moore had grossly misled, and in some cases lied, to the staff of the bank in order to get his desired shots for the Columbine film. Numerous other subjects of Moore's films were later interviewed by Wilson in the Michael Moore Hates America film, many of which decried Moore's work as overt propaganda, including double-arm amputee soldier Peter Damon in Fahrenheit 9/11 who stated on camera for Wilson, "I want nothing to do with that man [Moore] and his propaganda."

== Reception ==
On Rotten Tomatoes, the film was found to receive a generally positive reception, with 75% of critics giving the movie favorable reviews. Some critics favored the film's examination of Moore's methods. The film was also nominated for Best Documentary from the New York International Independent Film and Video Festival. Ebert and Roeper gave it “Two thumbs up”.
