= Die Laughing (album) =

Studio album by Doug Stanhope
- Released: August 20, 2002
- Genre: Comedy
- Length: 64:11
- Label: Stand Up! Records

Doug Stanhope chronology
Something to Take the Edge Off (2000)	Die Laughing (2002)	Deadbeat Hero (2004)

Professional ratings
Review scores
Source	Rating
AllMusic	2.5/5 stars

Die Laughing is the fourth stand-up comedy album by Doug Stanhope, released in 2002 by Stand Up! Records.

== Track listing ==
1. "Stillborn Liver" - 2:05
2. "DUI/MADD" - 5:03
3. "Drugs Are for Kids" - 1:30
4. "Second Hand Bullshit" - 3:52
5. "Hair in My Food" - 1:41
6. "Get Off the Field, You Suck!" - 3:16
7. "School Shootings" - 5:35
8. "Cowards" - 3:56
9. "Ants" - 1:25
10. "Wisdom" - 2:19
11. "President Doug" - 3:23
12. "Fuck You God" - 4:48
13. "Try Sodomy!" - 6:49
14. "Pro Abortion" - 1:45
15. "Lucky in Love" - 2:41
16. "Stuff I Should Have Edited Out But Didn't" - 1:54
17. "Eeewwww!" - 3:27
18. "The Upside of Sexual abuse" - 0:49
19. "To Tell You the Truth" - 3:46
20. "Potty Mouth" - 1:08
21. "The Beautiful People" - 4:42

== Personnel ==
- John Machnik – Remastering
- Dan Schlissel – Editing
- Mike Sommerfeldt – Editing, Remastering
