= Dave Losso =

American stand-up comedian

- Born: 1986 or 1987 (age 39–40); Chicago, Illinois
- Occupation: Stand-up comedian
- Years active: 2012-present
- Website: davelosso.tumblr.com

Dave Losso is an American stand-up comedian, writer, and comic-book artist from Chicago now living in Seattle.

Losso's 2021 Stand Up! Records album and video A Careless Whisper of a Man reached No. 2 on the iTunes comedy chart and No. 4 on Amazon's chart.

== Early life ==
Losso was born and raised in the south side of Chicago, Illinois.

== Career ==
=== Stand-up comedy ===
Losso began performing stand-up in 2012. Savage Henry Magazine called him a "joke machine".

In Chicago, he was a co-founder and co-host of the Yeah Buddy Awesome Time Comedy Show, co-host of Best Night Ever, and a frequent performer at longrunning show and podcast We Still Like You; Best Night Ever producer Sam Ash McHale called him "one of the funniest comics in Chicago."

While living in Denver in 2016, Losso started a new edition of We Still Like You. He has toured widely across the U.S., and has performed at the High Plains Comedy Festival, Orlando Indie Comedy Festival, Hell Yes Fest, Savage Henry Comedy Festival, Chicago Nerd Comedy Festival, Beast Village Comedy Festival, Cream City Comedy Festival, 10,000 Laughs Comedy Festival, and the Turnbuckle Comedy and Music Festival.

In 2016, he appeared in the SeeSo series Hidden America with Jonah Ray.

=== Albums ===
Losso's album and video A Careless Whisper of a Man was released July 16, 2021, on Stand Up! Records. It reached No. 2 on the iTunes comedy chart and No. 4 on Amazon's chart. Reviewer Richard Lanoie of The Serious Comedy Site called it "an entertaining and fun stand-up comedy album," noting that "Losso does biographical and anecdotal/observational comedy in a laid-back way."

=== Other work ===
Losso's work in comic books includes 2010's The Great Sandwich Detective, an all-ages Sherlock Holmes spoof he wrote and drew, and superhero thriller Kill The Wonderhawks, released in 2011 by Less Than Jake drummer Vinnie Fiorello's imprint Paper + Plastick, which Losso wrote and co-created with artist Aaron Pittman. His visual art has appeared in the touring art show Thirty Three Point Three and concert posters for bands and comedians including The Number 12 Looks Like You, Tig Notaro and The Sklar Brothers.

His comedic writing has been published in Savage Henry Magazine, Zaftig, and The Whiskey Journal.

In 2005, Losso was the vocalist for Chicago hardcore band Murder in E Minor. He credits the experience of touring in hardcore bands with preparing him for life as an indie road comic.

== Personal life ==
Losso now lives in Seattle. Losso met his wife, comedian Jessica Hong, at a comedy festival in New Orleans in 2015. They have a daughter.

== Discography ==
- Dave Losso, A Careless Whisper of a Man (Stand Up! Records, 2021)

== Podcast appearances ==
Podcast! Podcast! Podcast!, "Dave Losso & Sam Tallent" (October 21, 2015)
Empty Girlfriend, "Episode 55: EG @ Hell Yes Fest" (November 9, 2015)
These Things Matter, "Episode 189: Jaws" (February 16, 2016)
We Still Like You, "It's Not We Still Like You, It's Me" (February 7, 2017)
My Violet Tendencies: The Matt Knicks Show, "Episode 6: Dave Losso (Stand Up Comic)" (March 9, 2018)
The Grit City Podcast, "Episode 181: Comedian - Dave Losso" (August 23, 2021)
