= Sicko (album) =

Studio album by Doug Stanhope
- Released: April 20, 1999
- Genre: Comedy
- Length: 59:23
- Label: -ismist Recordings later Stand Up! Records

Doug Stanhope chronology
The Great White Stanhope (1998)	Sicko (1999)	Something to Take the Edge Off (2000)

Professional ratings
Review scores
Source	Rating
Allmusic	link

Sicko is the second stand-up comedy album by Doug Stanhope. It was released in 1999 by Stand Up! Records and recorded live at The Laff Stop comedy club in Houston, Texas.
Intended as a replacement to his debut album, The Great White Stanhope, Sicko contains much of the same material as his freshman effort, including the infamous "Banana Lady" and "Transvestite Hooker" stories.

== Track listing ==
1. "No Holes Barred" - 2:36
2. "Mom" - 6:10
3. "Someone's Been Sleeping in My Bed" - 2:33
4. "!*?$%! Truckers" - 3:36
5. "Ecstasy" - 2:05
6. "For the Man Who Has Everything" - 2:50
7. "The Perfect Girl" - 3:24
8. "Tits Are Illegal" - 3:09
9. "Smoke This" - 3:32
10. "Terrible Piece of Ass" - 4:10
11. "The Banana Lady" - 7:38
12. "SICKO" - 4:51
13. "The Transvestite Hooker Incident" - 5:13
14. "Big Dick Dreams" - 2:11
15. "$5" - 5:29
