= Tartan Senior High School =

Public secondary school in Minnesota, US

Tartan High School
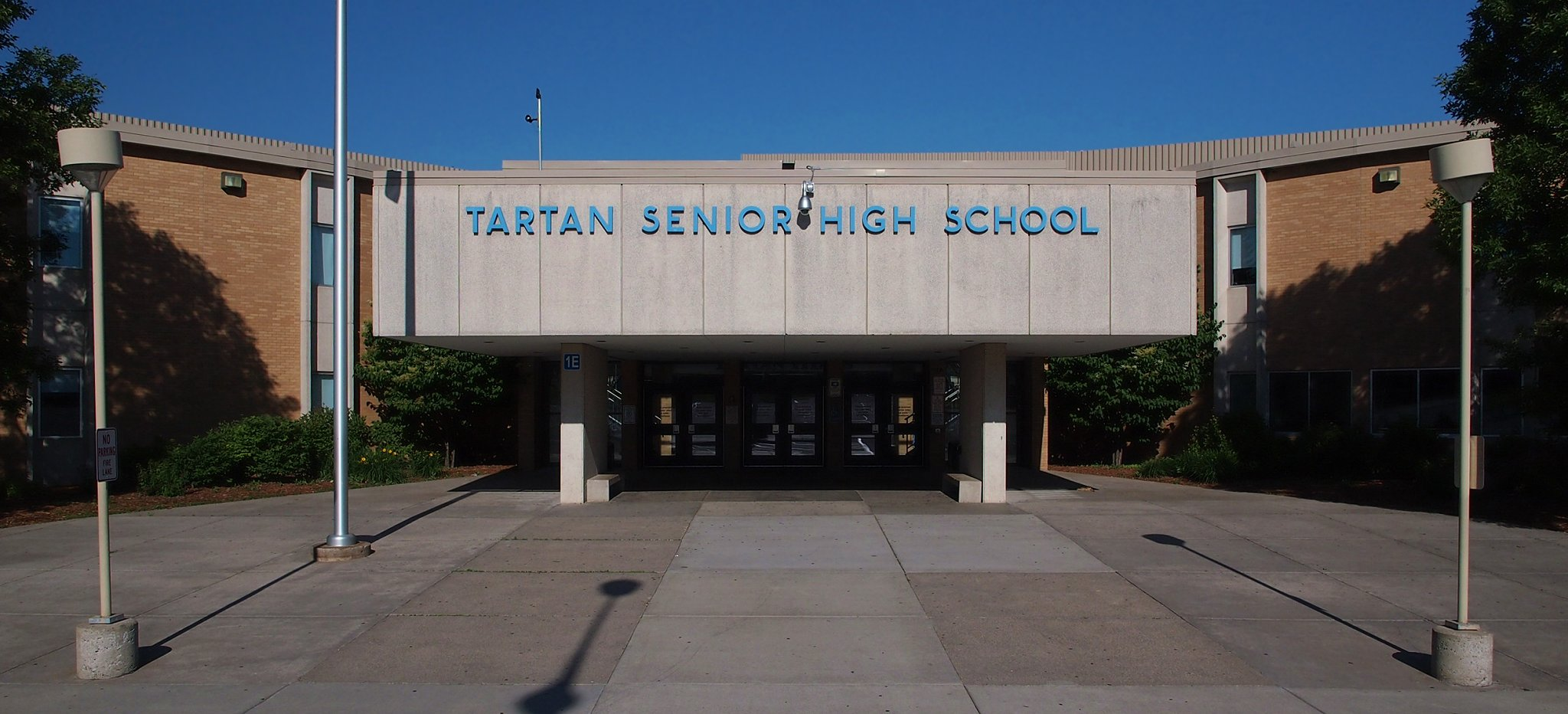
- Main entrance of Tartan Senior High School (2015)

Location
- 828 Greenway Avenue North; Oakdale, Minnesota; 55128; United States; 44°57′37″N 92°58′19″W

Information
- Type: Public
- Established: 1971
- School district: ISD 622
- Principal: Bethany DeCent
- Teaching staff: 95.75 (on FTE basis)
- Grades: 9-12
- Enrollment: 1,743 (2023–2024)
- Student to teacher ratio: 18.20
- Colors: Black, White and Royal Blue
- Athletics conference: Metro East
- Mascot: Titan
- Website: Tartan High School Home

Tartan Senior High School is a public four-year secondary school in Oakdale, Minnesota, United States. It is a member of Independent School District 622.

== Demographics ==
Since opening in 1971, Tartan has grown to more than 1,800 students supported by 120-plus teachers, administrators, aides, custodians, administrative assistants, and other support staff.

Tartan's racial makeup is 32.2% White, 20.8% Hispanic, 20.2% Asian, 18.5% African American, 7.4% of two or more races, and 0.8% American Indian students. 56.5% of its students are on free or discounted lunch.

== Performance ==
Tartan is ranked 60th among schools in Minnesota, 53rd in the Minneapolis–Saint Paul metropolitan area, and 3,581st nationally. It has a graduation rate of 88%. It has a science proficiency of 46%, a mathematics proficiency of 55%, and a reading proficiency of 58%.

== Cancer cluster ==
The quality of Washington County's drinking water, poisoned by chemicals from 3M, has been blamed for an outbreak of cancer and other diseases at the school.

== Notable alumni ==
- KayCyy, singer–songwriter
- Patricia Mueller, politician and educator
- Tou Xiong, politician
- Bill Young, comedian
