= Aaron Aryanpur =

American stand-up comedian

- Born: 1977 or 1978 (age 48–49); Texas
- Education: University of Texas at Dallas
- Occupations: Stand-up comedian, graphic designer, voice actor
- Years active: 2002-present
- Children: 2
- Website: aaronaryanpur.com

Aaron Aryanpur is an American stand-up comedian, artist, and voice actor from Dallas, Texas.

He has released two comedy albums on Stand Up! Records: 2016's In Spite Of, which reached No. 10 on the Billboard comedy chart, and 2018's Employee of the Day.

== Early life ==
Aryanpur was born in Texas; his father was a Persian immigrant, and his mother was Jewish. He grew up in the Texas towns of Denton, Palestine, and Plano, and graduated from Plano Senior High School. Growing up, he was a fan of comedians who addressed social issues, including George Carlin and Bill Hicks.

He studied graphic design at the University of Texas at Dallas, graduating in 2000. In 1998, he created the university's mascot Temoc, a flame-haired anthropomorphic comet originally named "Blaze."

== Career ==
=== Stand-up comedy ===
Aryanpur first performed stand-up in 2002, and became a full-time comic in 2013. His material is often about his family life as a father and husband. Jeremy Hallock of the Dallas Observer has noted that Aryanpur's style, typified by long-form stories with an "impeccable sense of rhythm", avoids the lack of edginess associated with family comedy by "capturing the anger and frustration that goes with the territory while making it hilarious". He usually does not focus on his ethnicity in his comedy, although he has stated that "One of the reasons I wanted to do stand-up at the beginning was to give voice to that [Iranian-American] part of myself." Critic Amy Martin of TheaterJones has stated that Aryanpur's comedy gains an extra level due to his "ability to be serious. ... Audiences respond to the sense of coiled power and solid equilibrium. Aryanpur emanates a gravity that draws them in. ... Relaying his everyman frustrations with dry, precise humor, Aryanpur's thought-provoking observations convey clever wordplay and logical twists."

In 2002, he was invited by fellow comics Raj Sharma and Paul Varghese to join their Indians at the Improv tour, a first for Indian-American stand-ups. Aryanpur himself is not Indian but of Iranian descent, but was invited because, as Aryanpur said jokingly in an interview, "they looked around for Indian comics and ran out after only two," but needed a third for the tour's theme to work. Varghese also joked to one interviewer that "I said, 'I know this Iranian guy, his name ends with -pur. Close enough.'"

Aryanpur won the 2012 Funniest Comic in Texas contest.

The Dallas Observer has frequently singled him out for praise, most notably by naming him the city's best comic in 2017. It also included him in a list of "10 Dallas Comedians You Need to Know" in 2015, and profiled him in the "100 Dallas Creatives" series in 2014. The newspaper noted that his success has helped the city as a whole, saying "Aryanpur is one of the reasons why Dallas has a comedy scene."

He was a semifinalist in Comedy Central's 2013 national Up Next Talent Search and NBC's Stand Up for Diversity.

He has frequently performed on the Fox TV series Laughs.

He tours frequently in clubs across the U.S., cruise ships, and comedy festivals including South by Southwest, Gilda's LaughFest in Grand Rapids, Michigan, Dallas Comedy Festival, Moontower Comedy and Oddity Festival, and the Plano Comedy Festival. He has been featured on Comedy Central Radio.

After opening for Maz Jobrani's Axis of Evil Comedy Tour, Aryanpur became a co-host of Jobrani's fatherhood podcast Minivan Men in 2013.

Aryanpur also teaches stand-up.

=== Albums ===
Aryanpur has released two comedy albums on Stand Up! Records.

His 2016 debut In Spite Of reached No. 10 on the Billboard comedy chart August 10, 2016, and No. 1 on the iTunes comedy chart. In Spite Of is a live recording of a set at Hyena's Comedy Club in Dallas in 2015.

His 2018 album Employee of the Day is an exploration of fatherhood from both sides, juxtaposing Aryanpur's life with his children and his father, who died shortly after the recording of the album. Richard Lanoie of The Serious Comedy Site called Employee "excellent through and through" and that Aryanpur was "immediately likable." The album cover features Aryanpur's own illustration.

=== Other work ===
His cartooning work includes the strips Next Window Please, and Bite the Bullet. He often draws caricatures of other comedians. He has also created posters for comics including J.T. Habersaat and Eddie Pepitone. He has worked in the advertising industry as a creative director.

His voice work includes the video games Paladins: Champions of the Realm and Smite.

== Personal life ==
He is married and has two sons.

== Discography ==
- Aaron Aryanpur, In Spite Of (Stand Up! Records, 2016)
- Aaron Aryanpur, Employee of the Day (Stand Up! Records, 2018)
