= Lou Moon =

American comedian

- Born: 1991 or 1992 (age 33–34); McMinnville, Oregon
- Occupation: Stand-up comedian
- Years active: 2010s-present

Lou Moon is an American comedian from Phoenix, Arizona. He has headlined across the United States, and released his debut album Lou on Stand Up! Records in 2024.

He is on the autism spectrum, and his comedy often deals with this and other issues such as his disability and anxiety.

== Early life ==
Moon was born in McMinnville, Oregon. As a child, his family moved to Kirkland, Washington, then to Gilbert, Arizona, near Phoenix, where he grew up. Due to his autism, he did not speak until age four, but read prolifically; one of his first words was "palaeontologist." He first became interested in comedy at age 12, when he discovered Brian Regan and Jim Gaffigan.

Before becoming a comedian, Moon studied zoology in college, with a specialization in taxonomy. He also performed as guitarist and bassist in several Phoenix-area punk bands, and wrote an unpublished novel inspired by Kurt Vonnegut about a murder at a Mars colony. He played trombone in his high school jazz band.

== Career ==
Moon began performing comedy in 2016.

Moon has performed at comedy clubs across the United States. He is a frequent headliner in Phoenix, and has hosted monthly comedy shows such as Punk is Dead But Comedy Isn't, Island Time, a show combining stand-up comedy and punk music, and the Lawn Gnome's Pink Slip Open Mic.

Moon has also performed at comedy festivals including the Altercation Comedy Festival in Austin, Texas, Big Pine Comedy Festival, and Bird City Comedy Festival.

His influences include Steve Martin, Andy Kaufman, Conan O'Brien, and particularly Eugene Mirman. He was buoyed as a starting comic when Mirman, after meeting Moon backstage when Mirman was on tour in Phoenix, made a point of stopping in to see Moon's set at another club.

He is one of five Arizona comedians featured in the 2023 documentary Zen Comedy, filmed at the Reiki Academy in Phoenix.

He also teaches stand-up comedy.

=== Recordings ===
Moon is signed to Minneapolis comedy label Stand Up! Records.

His debut album Lou was released in 2024. It was recorded at Phoenix punk-rock club Rebel Lounge. The album title and cover art for Lou both homage the Joni Mitchell album Blue, one of Moon's favorite records. Lou reached No. 1 on the Amazon comedy chart and No. 4 on the iTunes comedy chart.

As of 2024, he is working on his next album.

=== Podcasting ===
Moon has hosted or co-hosted several podcasts, including Ghost Boys with Tristan Bowling, in which comedians tell ghost stories, and The Best Animal Review Podcast with Phoenix comic Zack Lyman, in which they rank animals such as octopus and pronghorn on a five-star scale.

== Personal life ==
Moon is bisexual. He is disabled and walks with a cane.

== Discography ==
- Lou (Stand Up! Records, 2024)

== Selected podcasts ==
- Cutting Up With Cari, "Episode 1: Esquire Magazine #7, Most Eligible Bachelors 1987, Lou Moon" (May 6, 2024)
- What the Heck with Richard Dweck, "Lou Moon" (March 9, 2024)
- Mattsplaining, "Kurt Vonnegut" (November 6, 2023)
- Zack Lyman Podcast, "Lou Moon's Comedy Album Recording Journey" (July 31. 2023)
- Joy Boys, "Metaverse Subway W/ Lou Moon" (March 7, 2022)
- Adult Humor, "Lou Moon & Dana Whissen: August '05" (January 26, 2022)
- Life Coaching Comedians, Season 4, Episode 25: Lou Moon "I Don't Know How To Talk To Women!" (October 3, 2021)
- A Comedy Advice Podcast, Episode 266: Lou Moon (July 27, 2021)
- Adult Humor, "Lou Moon: October '92" (July 18, 2021)
- Podcast of Dustiny, Episode 8: "The Lost Leaf With Lou Moon" (December 3, 2020)
- Zack Lyman Podcast, "Stop Struggling With Comedy Writing With Lou Moon" (November 20, 2020)
- Zack Lyman Podcast, "Does Watching Comedy Specials Make You Funnier? Special Guest Lou Moon" (November 17, 2020)
- Playlists With People, "006: Steely Dan w/ Lou Moon" (August 10, 2020)
- Beyond Gender Podcast, "Lou Moon: What's So Funny?" (May 27, 2020)
- Taste Buddies with Genevieve Rice, "Thick Boys with Lou Moon" (October 11, 2018)
- Bar Room Heroes, Episode 62: "You're the Same Person" (March 2, 2018)
- Witch Doctorate, "Aries Lou Moon" (February 12, 2018)
