= Revolver (EP) =

EP by Lewis Black
- Released: July 1, 2002
- Recorded: November 1999; Laugh Lines Comedy Club; Madison, Wisconsin
- Genre: Comedy
- Length: 18:56
- Label: Stand Up! Records
- Producer: Lewis Black; John Machnik; Dan Schlissel

Lewis Black chronology
The White Album (2000)	Revolver (2002)	The End of the Universe (2002)

Revolver is an EP of outtakes made during the recording sessions of Lewis Black's first album, The White Album.

The title is a reference to the album Revolver by the Beatles. This was done to acknowledge the fact that these were outtakes and different edits from the sessions of Black's earlier release.

== Track listing ==
1. Wisconsin (unedited) – 6:54
2. Outtakes – 9:29
3. Leave a Tip – 2:33

On the vinyl version, the outtakes are divided into two parts due to the side break.

== Release history ==
Originally released as a run of 1000 CDs.

A limited ten-inch vinyl edition of 500 was released on yellow and red sunburst vinyl. The vinyl run includes a three-inch CD version of the same material. Notably, the vinyl is mastered with inverted grooves, so it plays from the label to the outer edge; standard vinyl records play from the outer edge towards the label.

This entire EP eventually became a hidden track on The White Album CD.
