= Johnny Taylor (comedian) =

American stand-up comedian

Johnny Taylor, Jr.
- Born: March 5, 1977 (age 49); Riverside, California
- Occupations: Stand-up comedian; actor; podcaster; writer
- Years active: 2011-present

Johnny Taylor Jr. is an American stand-up comedian, writer, actor, and podcaster from Sacramento, California. He has released two comedy albums and a charity single on Stand Up! Records. His debut, 2014's Tangled Up in Plaid, reached No. 7 on the iTunes comedy chart. His 2018 follow-up album and video Bummin' with the Devil was No. 1 on both the Amazon and iTunes comedy charts.

== Early life ==
Taylor was born March 5, 1977, in Riverside, California. He says that his childhood was "rocky"; his family moved several dozen times before settling in Sacramento. He was an amateur boxer from 13 to 19, and competed in Police Athletic League and Golden Gloves tournaments in Sacramento and Reno, Nevada. He hoped to turn professional, but a detached retina forced his retirement. He became a boxing trainer and co-owned a gym before becoming a comedian full-time.

== Career ==
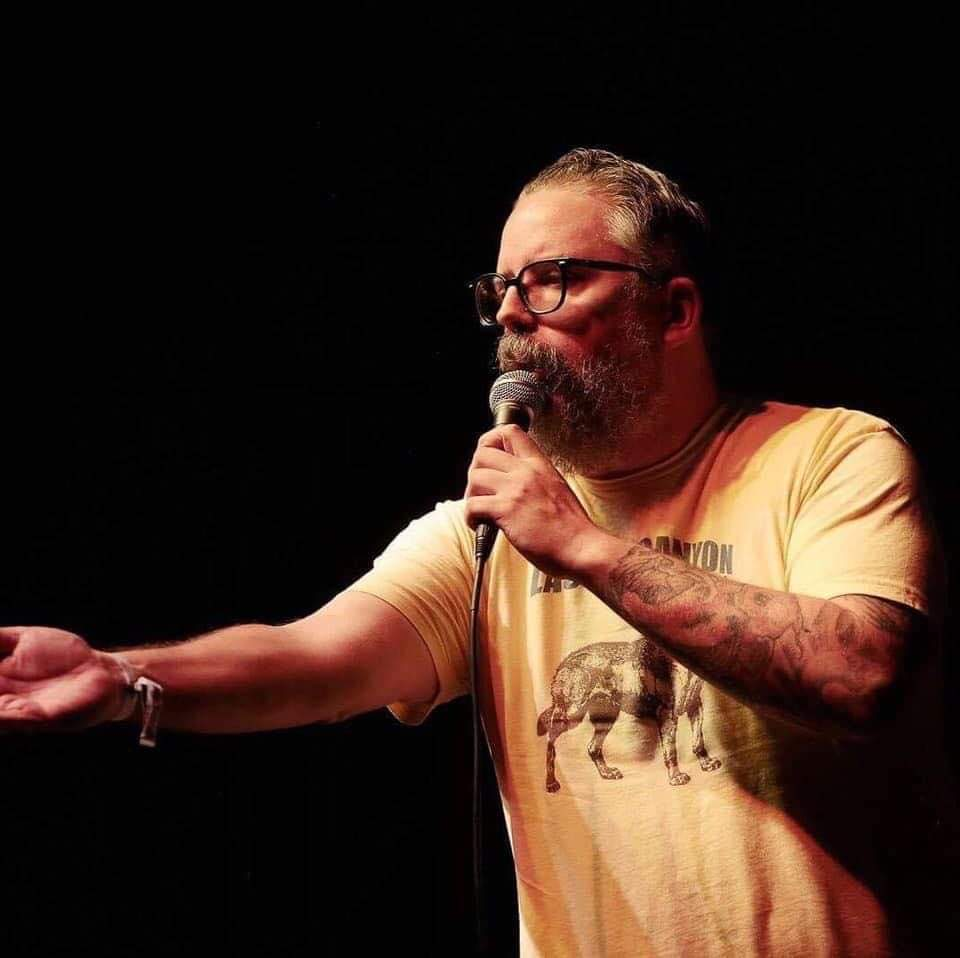
Taylor performing at the Mystic Theater in Petaluma, California, August 2018

Taylor began performing stand-up in May 2011, at age 33. His work ethic helped fuel his rise in the Northern California comedy scene; in his first year as a comic, he drove to San Francisco and performed at as many open mics in one night as he could, appearing on stage between 300 and 400 times in 2011(in seven months). He won the Stand-up Shootout competition in Sacramento in 2011, was named the city's best comedian in 2016 by readers of the Sacramento News & Review, and finished second in the same poll in 2014.

Taylor considers himself to be a "storyteller comic", and much of his material is drawn from his life. He is known for his deeply personal, brutally honest and often dark comedy, which includes routines about his divorces and his parents' deaths. He has toured across the U.S. and Canada, and is a regular on the comedy festival circuit, performing at San Francisco Sketchfest, the New Orleans Hell Yes Fest, the Asheville Comedy Festival, Altercation Fest, the Sacramento Comedy Festival, and the Chico Comedy Festival. He tours frequently with Brian Posehn.

Taylor also writes for The Hard Times, punk-rock satire website. In September 2020, he began hosting pop-culture podcast Hipsterocracy for The Hard Times' podcasting network, on which Taylor has interviewed other comedians as well as musicians including Brendan Benson and Blag Dahlia of the Dwarves.

In 2015, he co-hosted the podcast It's Funny Because with fellow Sacramento comic Keith Lowell Jensen, in which the pair interviewed national and Sacramento-area comedians. The Sacramento Bee said that it is "a riveting and eye-opening dissection of the art and craft of comedy." With comedian Daniel Humbarger, he co-hosted the sports podcast Cowbell Kingdom in 2015 and 2016. In 2021, Taylor began hosting the talk-show/news-commentary webseries The Nonfiction with Johnny Taylor, Jr. He has written for the Huffington Post, Laughspin, Laugh Button, McSweeneys, and The Interrobang.

=== Albums ===
Taylor has released two comedy albums and a charity single on Stand Up! Records. His debut, 2014's Tangled Up in Plaid, reached No. 7 on the iTunes comedy chart. It was reviewed positively by critics. Chris Spector of Midwest Record praised Taylor's "punk-rock energy" and said "he's got a sharp wit that really cuts to the bone." Brett Watson of The Serious Comedy Site said "Taylor is an absolute master of misdirection. Many of the punchlines go in directions you will never see coming."

His 2018 followup album and video Bummin' with the Devil hit No. 1 on both the Amazon and iTunes comedy charts. Aaron Carnes of the Sacramento News & Review called it an improvement over his debut, saying that Taylor "never rushes a punchline and tells true stories with absurd details." Lara Smith of ComedyWham, a website in Austin, Texas, noted Taylor's "evolution and growth" as a comic, saying "he’s grown more comfortable as a performer and a polished storyteller." Richard Lanoie of The Serious Comedy Site praised the "dark and autobiographical humor" but felt his Donald Trump material (recorded before the 2016 presidential election) was dated.

== Discography ==
- Johnny Taylor; Tangled Up in Plaid; (Stand Up! Records, 2014)
- Johnny Taylor; '"Trump. Sugar. Sux. Tragic"; (Stand Up! Records, 2017, charity single)
- Johnny Taylor; Bummin' with the Devil; (Stand Up! Records, 2018)
