= Kelly Pryce =

American stand-up comedian

- Born: 1976 or 1977 (age 48–49)
- Occupation: Stand-up comedian
- Years active: 2003-present

Kelly Pryce is a stand-up comedian and writer from Sacramento, California. She was a staff writer for the George Lopez talk show Lopez Tonight, and a contestant on Last Comic Standing in 2014. Her debut album, 2020's Life With a Pryce, was produced by Grammy winner Dan Schlissel for his label Stand Up! Records.

== Early life, family and education ==
The oldest of four children, Pryce grew up in a blue-collar neighborhood in Sacramento, California. Childhood dyslexia made school difficult, but she compensated by learning to make her mother and classmates laugh by impersonating her teachers.

== Career ==
Pryce began performing stand-up comedy at age 22. Sacramento magazine called her comedy "brazen and fearless" for not shying away from risqué and R-rated material while still focusing on topics such as family life and children. Pryce commented to an interviewer for Capital Public Radio that "I have a family and I talk about them in not a family-act way," joking that she wouldn't let her children listen to her act until they were over 21. She has frequently toured with Dave Attell, and cites both Attell and Rosie O’Donnell among her comedic influences.

From 2003 to 2006, she hosted a morning show on KWOD-FM in Sacramento with Boomer Barbosa, Ian Gary and DJ Mervin, which ended when the station was sold and changed format.

Pryce joined Lopez Tonight in 2010, writing topical and political monologues and skits, and occasionally performing in sketches.

In 2012, she performed in New York for the stand-up series NickMom Night Out.

She appeared on Last Comic Standing in 2014, making it to the third round of the invitationals.

She appeared in the 2015 TLC series What She Said, which featured female comedians commenting on motherhood and other issues.

== Personal life ==
Pryce has four children.

== Discography ==
- Life With a Pryce (Stand Up! Records, 2020)
