= Ray Harrington =

American comedian

- Born: 1983 (age 42–43)
- Occupation: Stand-up comedian
- Years active: 2010-present
- Website: www.rayharringtoncomedy.com

Ray Harrington is an American comedian, podcaster, and filmmaker from Maine who currently resides in Rhode Island. He has released two albums, including Overwhelmed, which reached No. 15 on Billboard's Comedy Albums chart. He has performed across the United States, United Kingdom, Ireland, and Mexico.

He directed and starred in the 2015 feature documentary Be a Man, which premiered on Hulu.

== Early life ==
Harrington was born in 1983. His parents divorced when he was young, and he was raised by his mother, grandmother, and great-grandmother. The family moved from Connecticut to Kittery, Maine in fifth grade, and he turned to cracking jokes as a way to make new friends.

He attended the New England School of Communications in Bangor, Maine, graduating in 2010 with degrees in radio broadcasting and marketing communications. He began his stand-up career at college when friends signed him up for a campus talent show.

== Comedy style ==
Harrington's influences as a comedian include George Carlin and the Canadian sketch troupe Kids in the Hall. Harrington's comedy is often observational, personal, and autobiographical. His affable stage persona and large physical presence (he is 6'7") led a reviewer in the Boston Globe to note his "innate, John Candy-esque likability."

== Career ==
Providence, Rhode Island's Motif magazine nominated Harrington for best comedian in the publication's RI Spoken Awards in both 2023 and 2025. He was also named best comedian by the Providence Phoenix in 2010. He was a finalist in the 2013 Boston Comedy Festival Competition and was selected as part of Comedy Central’s “Up Next” Showcase in 2012.

Harrington has toured widely across the U.S. and has performed in London and at the Akumal Comedy Festival in Mexico. In 2017, Harrington performed his show Immaterial in Scotland at the Edinburgh Festival Fringe. He has also headlined at the Red Clay Comedy Festival, Rogue Island Comedy Festival, Newport, Rhode Island's Winter Comic Festival, Whale City Comedy Festival, and the Las Vegas World Series of Comedy.

Harrington performed on Conan O'Brien's TBS late-night talk show Conan in February 2020.

=== Recordings ===
Harrington has released two comedy albums, 2013's The Worst is Over and 2017's Overwhelmed, both on comedy label Stand Up! Records.

The Worst Is Over was recorded in September 2012 at the Comedy Connection club in Portland, Maine. It was released in 2013 on Stand Up! Records and debuted at No. 1 on the Amazon and iTunes comedy charts. Ed Placencia of Comedy Reviews praised Harrington's " grounded likability and regular guy-ness." Jake Austen of Roctober magazine called The Worst is Over a "solid debut of regular guy comedy by a big dude getting big laughs."

Harrington's second album, Overwhelmed, was recorded in April 2017 at the Rockwell Theater in Somerville, Massachusetts. It was released in September 2017. In its first week of release, Overwhelmed reached No. 15 on Billboard's Comedy Albums chart. The album also reached No. 1 on Amazon's comedy albums chart. Pia Guerra, Eisner Award-winning co-creator of Y: The Last Man, drew the cover for the album. Tony Pacitti of Providence Monthly called Overwhelmed ""infectiously charming" and refreshingly uncynical.

=== Films ===
In 2012, Harrington starred in the short film Relax, directed by Corey Brailsford. At the 2012 48 Hour Film Project contest in Providence, Relax won three awards, including Best Film, Best Director, and Best Actor for Harrington, and was screened at the national awards ceremony in Hollywood.

==== Be a Man ====
In 2015, Harrington wrote and directed an autobiographical documentary, Be a Man, co-produced by his frequent collaborator Derek Furtado. The film explores the meaning of masculinity in American culture through the lens of Harrington's experience as a new father who grew up without a male role model. Harrington sets out to learn about "manly" topics such as winning a fight and finding a favorite cocktail, with help from comedians Kyle Kinane, Doug Stanhope, Robert Kelly, April Macie, and Stephen Rannazzisi of The League, actor Tom Wilson, and boxer Vinny Pazienza. The documentary was filmed entirely in Rhode Island on a budget of only $11,000.

Be a Man won the Best Feature Documentary award at the 2015 Somewhat North of Boston Film Festival, and was named Best Documentary at the Los Angeles Comedy Festival. The film also played at the New Haven Documentary Film Festival and the New York Comedy Festival in 2016 before premiering on the streaming service Hulu.

Dennis Perkins of the Portland Press Herald called Be a Man an "endearing, thoughtful, sweet, and very funny chronicle of the burly, baby-faced comic's attempt to master the 'manly virtues' he feels he's lacking."

==== Undependent ====
Harrington and Furtado's next project was the mockumentary web series Undependent, which premiered at the Rhode Island International Film Festival in 2019. The series follows Harrington and Furtado trying to produce a second documentary. Undependent won Best Comedy and was nominated for two other awards at the 2020 NYC Web Fest. Harrington also won best male performance for Undependent at the London International Web and Short Film Festival.

=== Podcasting ===
Harrington's podcasts include Funbearable, which he began in 2022 with comics Brad Rohrer and Chuck Staton after previously being a frequent guest on the duo's earlier show The Chuck and Brad Podcast. Before that, he hosted Ray Harrington Must Content, which ran for 28 episodes in 2021–22, and (with Derek Furtado) With Ray And Derek, which ran in the mid-2010s. Their 2015 Christmas episode, in the mode of a 1970s variety show, was named one of "the best Christmas podcasts of all time" by Motif magazine.

== Personal life ==
Harrington lives in Warwick, Rhode Island. He is married and has a son.

== Discography ==
- The Worst is Over (Stand Up! Records, 2013)
- Overwhelmed (Stand Up! Records, 2017)
- Be a Man (DVD, Stand Up! Records, 2016)
