= The End of the Universe =

Live album by Lewis Black
- Released: July 1, 2002
- Recorded: August 24–26, 2001 and March 8–10, 2002; Atlanta, Georgia
- Genre: Comedy
- Length: 60:39
- Label: Stand Up! Records
- Producer: John Machnik; Dan Schlissel; Lewis Black

Lewis Black chronology
Revolver (2002)	The End of the Universe (2002)	Rules of Enragement (2003)

Professional ratings
Review scores
Source	Rating
AllMusic	4/5 stars

The End of the Universe is Lewis Black's second album, recorded at The Punchline in Atlanta, Georgia, United States, on two separate date ranges: August 24–26, 2001 and March 8–10, 2002, and released on July 1, 2002.

The title refers to Black's belief that the end of the universe is in Houston, Texas, where two Starbucks coffeehouses are located across the street from each other. In 2020, one of the two Starbucks locations closed.

== Track listing ==
1. "Atlanta" – 6:19
2. "After September 11th" – 3:31
3. "Environmental Terrorism or Global Warming?" – 7:59
4. "Coke and Pepsi and the Super Bowl of 2001" – 7:03
5. "Halftime at the Super Bowl 2001" – 5:46
6. "The End of the Universe" – 3:50
7. "Tax Rebates and Common Sense" – 4:56
8. "Airport Security" – 13:39
9. "TV News and Jerry Falwell" – 4:03
10. "What I've Learned" – 3:29

=== Notes ===
A limited vinyl picture-disk edition of 500 was released by Stand Up! Records. The edition was signed by Black before the manufacturing process was completed. His signature is part of the vinyl art, under the grooves.

The CD version of the album features a hidden track including outtakes of Lewis yelling at hecklers and muffing a couple jokes. The track can be heard by playing the beginning of track one and then using the rewind/search button to go back 14:53.
