= The Laff Stop =

Defunct comedy club in Houston, Texas

The Laff Stop was a comedy club, with locations in Texas and Montclair, California.

== History and venues ==
The Laff Stop was created by Michael Callie and originated in Newport Beach, California and featured comics such as Steve Martin, David Letterman, Elayne Boosler, Bill Hicks and Robin Williams. There were also Laff Stop clubs in Montclair, Ca, Palm Springs, CA and Austin, Texas (which changed its name to Cap City Comedy Club in 1996).

The location in Houston, Texas was open since 1977, and was one of the most successful clubs through the 1990s. It closed on December 19, 2009, in a surprise announcement. The Houston Laff Stop changed locations a few times during its existence, the last stop becoming an upstairs strip mall location at Waugh and Allen Parkway. The previous location on West Gray Street is now a bar called Local Pour. The club later served as a starting point and hometown club for such acts as Ralphie May and Brett Butler.

== In media ==
Albums and videos recorded at the Laff Stop include:

- Mitch Hedberg's Strategic Grill Locations CD: recording of a performance at the Laff Stop comedy club in Houston, Texas from September 7, 1999
- Dane Cook's Harmful If Swallowed CD/DVD
- Joe Rogan's I'm Gonna Be Dead Someday... CD
- Doug Stanhope's Sicko and Something to Take the Edge Off
- Ron White's Drunk in Public CD
- Louis CK's "Live in Houston"
- Bill Hicks "Sane Man"
