= Sam Miller (comedian) =

American comedian

- Born: 1982 or 1983 (age 43–44); Joint Base Lewis-McChord, Washington

Comedy career
- Years active: 2014-present
- Medium: Stand-up comedy, podcast
- Website: sammillercomedy.com

Sam Miller is an American comedian from Olympia, Washington. He has headlined across the United States, and released his debut album Round Trip on Stand Up! Records in 2023. His work is known for dealing frankly with issues of homelessness and drug addiction; Miller has been clean since 2008. Seattle magazine City Arts called Miller "an endearingly positive presence" in the comedy scene of the Pacific Northwest.

== Early life ==
Miller was born in a military hospital at Joint Base Lewis-McChord near Tacoma, Washington. Miller's father, a lieutenant colonel in the United States Air Force, died when Miller was 12. His mother, now retired, was a psychiatric nurse practitioner. He grew up in Spanaway, Washington; after his father's death, the family moved to nearby Olympia.

Miller began using drugs at age 14. As a teenager, Miller was arrested several times for minor drug violations and similar offenses, and was incarcerated in Yakima County Jail. After being expelled from high school, Miller worked for the U.S. Forest Service as a wilderness firefighter in the Okanogan-Wenatchee National Forest. He lost the job because of his drug problems. He was homeless for about a decade. During this time, he worked a variety of jobs, including dishwasher, bouncer, warehouse worker, landscaper, assistant preschool teacher, bartender, and farmhand. Miller decided to get sober in 2008, and eventually worked at a youth homeless shelter. He graduated from Evergreen State College in Olympia in 2017 and became a chemical dependency counselor and public speaker on addiction recovery.

== Career ==
Miller's first public performance was as part of a vaudeville show in Olympia in the mid-2000s, balancing a lawnmower on his chin.

Miller first did stand-up in 2014 at an open mic in Olympia. Much of his comedy deals with issues of homelessness, the prison system and stigmatization of drug addiction. Other topics include marriage and parenting, and living as a large person (he is 6 foot 6 and 360 pounds).

Miller has performed across the United States. Miller took second place in the 2021 Seattle International Comedy Competition. He also competed in the 2016 SICC. He was described by a fellow competitor as "like half grizzled sea captain and half someone who works at Build-A-Bear. You don’t know whether to be terrified or to hug him." Miller also won the Seattle-based stand-up competition Comedy on Trial in 2017.

Miller's journey from addiction to stand-up was profiled on the Seattle Times' Outsiders podcast in 2020, which looked at issues around homelessness. He also wrote about his life story in an article for Newsweek in 2023.

In 2017, he created and performed a multimedia stage show, The Jail Letters Project, based on correspondence between Miller and his mother while he was incarcerated in Yakima County Jail for drug-related offenses in 2003. During the show, Miller and his mother read excerpts from the letters and talked about how Miller's jail time and subsequent recovery from addiction had affected them. The project was inspired by a class on prison writing Miller took at Evergreen State College.

During the COVID-19 pandemic in 2020, Miller wrote 100 new jokes a week, performing via streaming on Facebook, to raise money for homeless nonprofits.

Miller has also produced comedy shows in Olympia, including co-founding the ongoing open mic event Vomity. He puts an emphasis on promoting diversity and inclusivity in the shows he promotes.

As of 2024, he is collaborating on a book with Seattle artist Pat Moriarity, who designed the album cover for Round Trip (as well as covers for bands including The Replacements and Soul Asylum).

=== Podcasting ===
Since 2023, Miller has co-hosted a comedy podcast, The Tarp Report, with Seattle comedian Jes Anderson. The podcast, which often deals with issues of sobriety, has produced 59 episodes as of April 2024. He has also guested several times on the syndicated radio program The Bob & Tom Show, and is a frequent guest on podcasts not only as a comedian but for his expertise in drug and homelessness issues.

=== Recordings ===
Miller is signed to Minneapolis comedy label Stand Up! Records. The first of three planned works on the label, the video and album Round Trip, was released October 27, 2023. Round Trip was recorded on April 23, 2022, at the Capitol Theater in Olympia—the location was chosen purposefully, as Miller's last night as a homeless person was spent across the street, in view of the theater. Round Trip reached No. 1 on the iTunes comedy chart the week of its release.

Richard Lanoie of The Serious Comedy Site called Round Trip "interesting and original", and praised it as "the best comedy album I have listened to all year."

=== Awards ===
Miller won the Washington Center For The Performing Arts' Achievement in the Arts award in 2024.

Miller also won three Best of Olympia awards in the annual readers' poll of Tacoma, Washington, alternative newspaper Weekly Volcano.

== Personal life ==
Miller is married and has two sons.

Miller is an avid magnet fisherman, and was profiled about his hobby in the Seattle Times in 2023.

Miller is heavily tattooed; his tattoos include two important personal milestones in his comedy career: the marquee of Olympia's Capitol Theater, and a picture of a vomiting man under the word "Vomity," celebrating the Olympia open mic he co-founded, Vomity.

== Discography ==
- Round Trip (Stand Up! Records, 2023)

== Selected podcasts ==
- The Art of Bombing: A Guide to Stand-Up Comedy, Episode 100: "Sam Miller & Loads of Fun" (June 25, 2019)
- The Vance Crowe Podcast, "Coronavirus Perspective: The Homeless During Coronavirus" (March 26, 2020)
- Topical Depression with Natalie Holt, November 14, 2019
- Outsiders, Episode 5, February 26, 2020
- The Parental Compass, November 17, 2021
- Revisionary Podcast, January 5, 2022
- Fadam and Friends, December 26, 2022
- Open Mic'ers Podcast, July 6, 2023
- DADennial, "Comedy, Recovery, and Fatherhood" (July 19, 2023)
- Loose Toss, "Chin Balancing with Sam Miller" (October 31, 2023)
- Passion Pod, March 18, 2024
- The Bob & Tom Show, June 9, 2023; October 18, 2023; April 3, 2024
