= Tim Slagle =

American comedian

Tim Slagle (born August 13, 1958) is an American stand-up comedian, writer/editor and a political pundit. His material leans towards political satire. He is known for his regular contributions to Liberty magazine. He currently lives in the Chicago metropolitan area.

== Biography ==
Slagle was born in Detroit, Michigan, and adopted by a middle-class family, living in the blue collar area of South Suburban Detroit known as Downriver. He was raised in Trenton, Michigan, graduating from Trenton High School in 1976. He briefly attended the University of Michigan, and eventually dropped out without a degree in 1979 to become a fringe part of the Detroit Punk scene in the band Boris Savage and the Primates.

In 1979 he started performing at the open mic nights at Mark Ridleys Comedy Castle in north suburban Detroit. As stand-up comedy clubs exploded around the country during the comedy boom of the 1980s, there were plenty of venues looking for comics, and by 1983, Slagle was traveling the country as a professional comic. After three years of living on the road, he settled in Chicago, where he became a regular in the Zanies chain of comedy clubs.

Slagle's style of comedy is observational and often ironic. In 1989, Slagle first appeared nationally on the Showtime Comedy Club Network, and again in 1991 on the MTV Half Hour Comedy Hour.

In 1996, he appeared on-stage in a small theater in Chicago, with comedian Tom Naughton in the Slagle Naughton Report.

In 2000 he also produced and starred in a brief run on local Minneapolis television show: The Mudslingers Ball, with Lewis Black, Will Durst, Jeffrey Jena, and host Mike Lukas. It aired on KSTP channel 5, an ABC affiliate.

He was interviewed and appeared briefly in the documentary Michael Moore Hates America (2004)

In late 2006, Slagle released his first CD, entitled Europa on Stand Up! Records. The CD is notable as a best of from Slagle's career and also features a cover by noted illustrator Jack Davis.

== Media releases ==
=== CDs ===
- Europa (2006) Stand Up! Records

=== VHS tapes ===
- Awake (1993)
- Nation of Criminals (1998)
- Live (2000)
