= April Macie =

American comedian

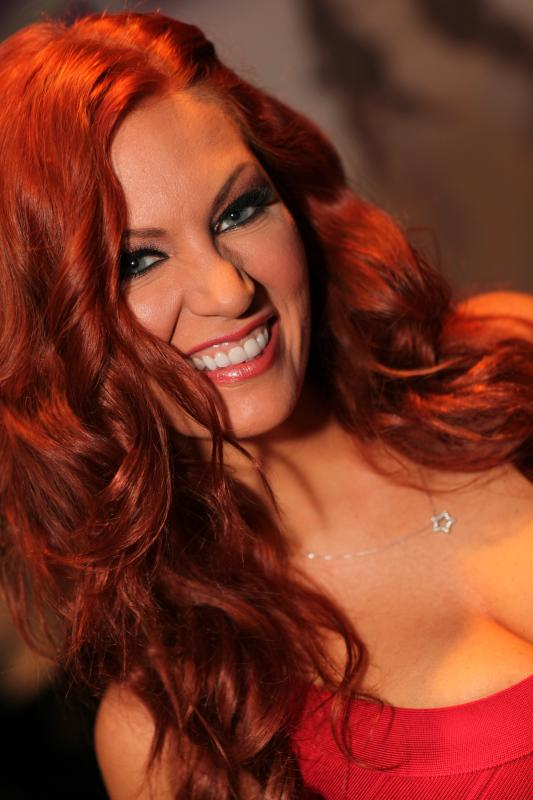
- April Macie in January 2013.
- Born: April Maciejczyk; September 30, 1982 (age 44); Easton, Pennsylvania
- Spouse: Arya Shoaee

Comedy career
- Genre: comedy
- Website: www.aprilmacie.com

April Macie (born Maciejczyk) is an American comedian, television personality, writer, and actress. She won Howard Stern's "Hottest and Funniest Chick" contest and appeared in the fourth season of NBC's reality series Last Comic Standing.

== Early years ==
Macie was born and raised in Easton, Pennsylvania, before moving to Florida after high school.

== Career ==
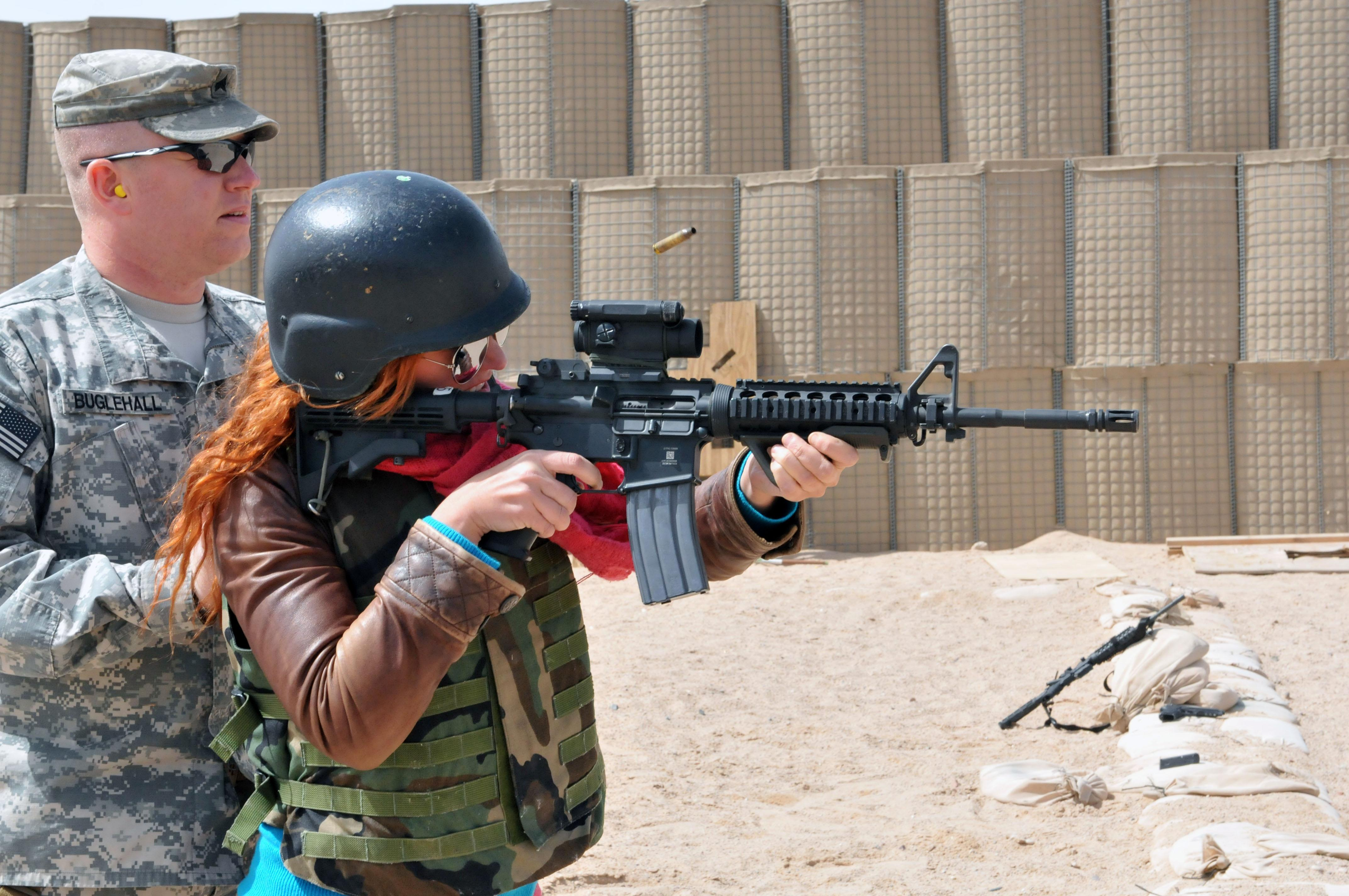
April Macie in Iraq with the USO in 2011.

Macie has been to over 68 countries, 16 of those performing stand-up comedy with the USO. She was a finalist on NBC's Last Comic Standing in 2006. Macie has appeared on E! Entertainment, Fuel TV, HSN, Sirius and XM Radio. Programs she has been on include Bob & Tom, Access Hollywood, and The Todd and Tyler Radio Empire, and she was labeled an "emerging talent to watch" by The Hollywood Reporter at the Just for Laughs Comedy Festival in 2005. In the early summer of 2006, she auditioned for Last Comic Standing and was accepted into the show's cast, but she was voted out in the initial round of competition. Macie is a regular guest on the Howard Stern Show, where in 2008 she was voted the "Funniest and Hottest" comedian in America. She has appeared on Showtime in the documentary, I Am Comic which premiered at the 2010 Slamdance Film Festival and in the stand-up special Vegas Is My Oyster premiering August 5. Macie was a featured performer in Snoop Dogg Presents The Bad Girls of Comedy which aired on Showtime in 2012. He appears in comedian Ray Harrington's 2015 documentary Be a Man. Macie performed on Episode 5 of the Netflix Series, Tiffany Haddish Presents: They Ready in 2019. Currently, she spends most of her time traveling the United States as a headlining stand-up comedian.

=== 30th AVN Awards ===
On January 19, 2013 Macie co-hosted the XXX AVN Awards alongside 2013 Female Performer of the Year Asa Akira, and AVN Hall of Fame inductee Jesse Jane.

== Filmography ==
- Tiffany Haddish Presents: They Ready (2019), as herself
- Comedy Underground with Dave Attell (2014), as herself
- Snoop Dogg Presents: The Bad Girls of Comedy (2012), as herself
- A Guy Walks Into a Bar (2011), Girl
- The Naughty Show (2011) – Episode #1.37, as herself
- Pauly Shore's Vegas Is My Oyster (2011), as herself
- I Am Comic (2010), as herself
- Road to Hollywood (2009), as herself
- April & Christina (2008), April
- Last Comic Standing (2006) – Episodes #4.1 and #4.5, as herself
