= The White Album (Lewis Black album) =

Studio album by Lewis Black
- Released: June 1, 2000
- Recorded: November 1999
- Venue: Laugh Lines Comedy Club (Madison, Wisconsin)
- Genre: Comedy
- Length: 50:20
- Label: -ismist Recordings later Stand Up! Records
- Producer: Lewis Black, John Machnik, Dan Schlissel

Lewis Black chronology
The White Album (2000)	Revolver (2002)

The White Album is Lewis Black's first album, recorded in 1999 at Laugh Lines Comedy Club in Madison, Wisconsin and released on June 1, 2000.

The cover and title is a reference to the album The Beatles (also commonly referred to as The White Album).

Professional ratings
Review scores
Source	Rating
AllMusic	3/5 stars

== Track listing ==
1. "Wisconsin" - 2:44
2. "The Fall, Hurricanes and Weathermen" - 9:04
3. "The Ozone, Sunblock, the Flu, and Nyquil" - 5:40
4. "Miami and Las Vegas" - 6:30
5. "Fuck, New York, Los Angeles" - 4:16
6. "TV Pilot" - 2:20
7. "IHOP (The International House of Pancakes)" - 4:11
8. "Heaven's Gate" - 2:12
9. "Bill Clinton and Oral Sex" - 2:33
10. "The Impeachment" - 2:37
11. "Education in Arkansas" - 3:10
12. "Other Idiots from Arkansas" - 5:01

=== Notes ===
Originally released on -ismist Recordings, the CD was rereleased when the comedy division of -ismist was spun off to become Stand Up! Records.

A limited vinyl edition of 450 was released on white vinyl by -ismist Recordings.

The CD version of the album features a hidden track, which was originally available separately under the title Revolver. Once Revolver appeared to be close to out of print, it was incorporated as a hidden track. The track can be heard by playing the beginning of track one and then using the rewind/search button to go back 21:15. Early pressings of the CD, prior to 2005, did not include a hidden track at all.

The first pressing of CDs on the original -ismist Recordings imprint were missing one track, a manufacturing mistake. The label offered a free copy of the "fixed" CD to people who had purchased the original pressing for several years.

In the final track, "Other Idiots from Arkansas", Black reads aloud from an article in the Arkansas Democrat-Gazette in which two men in Cotton Plant, Arkansas became injured after a bullet that had been inserted into their truck's fusebox subsequently discharged, causing the driver to lose control of the vehicle. This article is actually a hoax: the Democrat-Gazette publicly denies that it ever printed such a story and has set up a webpage to address the widespread distribution (chiefly through e-mail) of the fake article.
