= Mo Alexander =

American stand-up comedian and actor (born 1970)

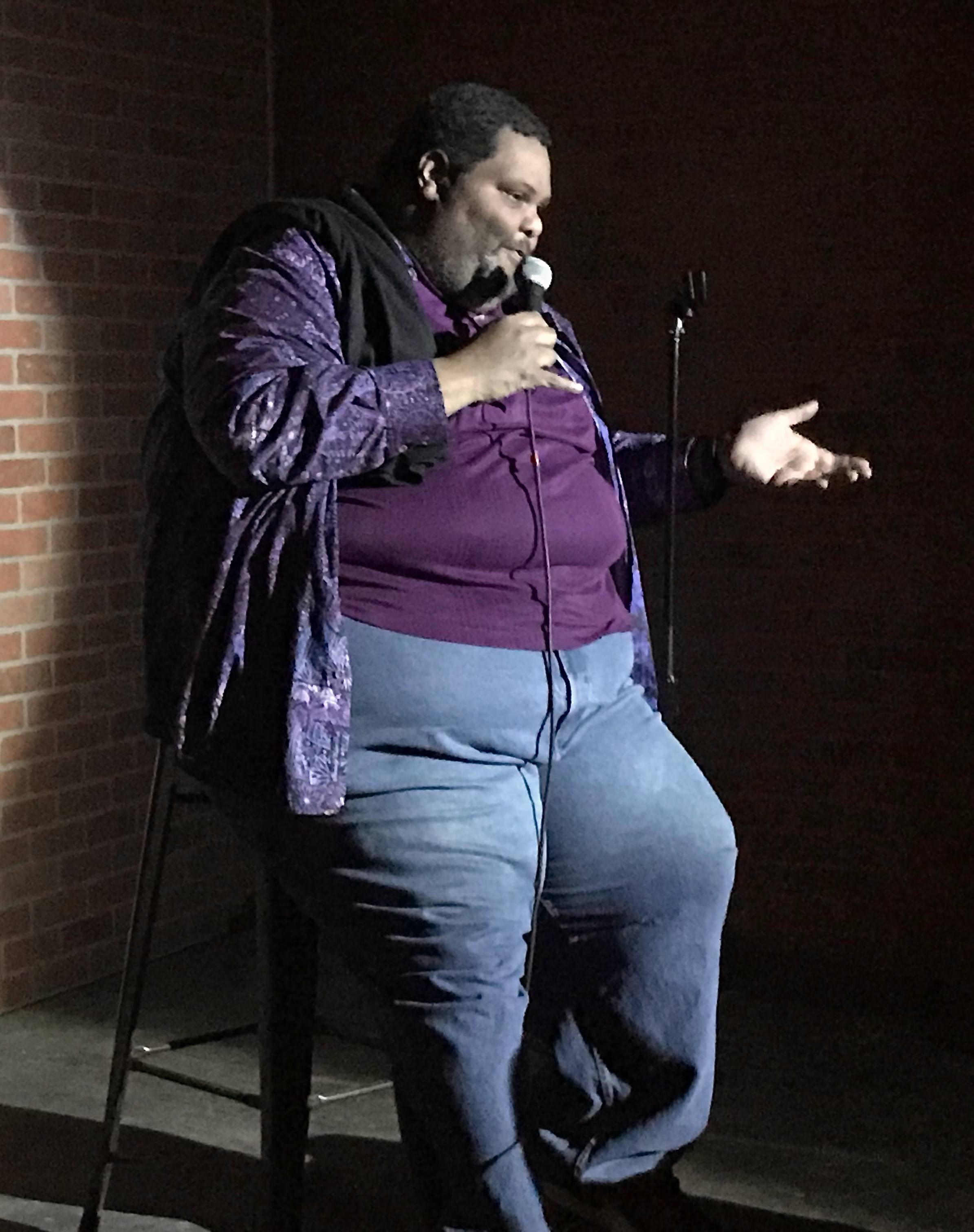
- Alexander in 2019
- Born: November 7, 1970 (age 55); Memphis, Tennessee
- Occupations: Stand-up comic, actor
- Years active: 1996–present

Mo Alexander (born November 7, 1970) is an American stand-up comedian and actor originally from Memphis, Tennessee. He has been headlining in comedy clubs and festivals since the mid-1990s. He has released six comedy albums, including 2022's Mo' Possum Blues on Stand Up! Records.

Donnie Snow of the Memphis Commercial Appeal called him "as funny and fearless a stand-up as the Mid- South ever produced."

== Early life ==
Alexander was born in south Memphis, near Stax Records, and raised by his mother (a grade-school teacher) and his grandmother. He grew up Catholic and attended Memphis Catholic Middle and High School; he later described himself as a "computer/theater nerd who also played sports", including performing as a cheerleader and school mascot. He attended the University of Memphis as a physics major and theater minor.

== Career ==
Alexander is known for his dark comedy, which often takes on issues of racism and American politics. His influences include Sinbad, George Carlin, Bill Cosby, Dick Gregory, Richard Pryor, Paul Mooney, and Laurie Kilmartin; he has credited Bill Hicks' brutal honesty as a particular influence.

Katie Murawski of Yes! Weekly called Alexander "a legend amongst national touring comics." The Memphis Flyer's annual Best of Memphis poll named Alexander one of the top comedians in the city four times.

He performed at his first open mic in 1993, at age 22. He became a full-time professional touring comic in 1996 after his grandmother died, and he decided to leave Memphis and go on the road for six months. In 1999, he was asked by Keenen Ivory Wayans to be his touring opener after impressing Wayans by roasting him in the green room. He has also opened for Dave Chappelle, Brian Regan, Chris Rock, Dom Irrera, and Tommy Davidson. In 2003 he was given his own Las Vegas show, "The Mo Funny Show", at the Casino Royale, which ran for six months. He has appeared on the syndicated radio shows The Bob & Tom Show and Mancow's Morning Madhouse, and has done comedy sets at both a furniture store and a nudist colony.

He was a semifinalist in the San Francisco Comedy Competition in 2012, and the Seattle International Comedy Competition in 2016. He has also headlined at comedy festivals including the Asheville Comedy Fest, Altercation Comedy Festival, Hopkins Comedy Festival, Memphis Comedy Festival, and North Carolina Comedy Festival.

=== Recordings ===
Alexander has released six comedy albums.

In 2015, Alexander developed blood clots in his heart and was pronounced clinically dead twice; he claims that he had a near-death experience in which he heard the chorus to The Notorious B.I.G.'s "Big Poppa". He spent 78 days in the hospital. The experience became the nucleus of his 2016 album Got Clots.

After self-releasing his earlier albums, Alexander signed with Dan Schlissel's Stand Up! Records in 2019. His 2022 album Mo' Possum Blues, his first for Stand Up!, was also the first comedy album ever recorded in Memphis' historic Sun Studios. The sessions were taped live in front of an audience of about 60 people. The label also released a seven-inch single of Alexander's blues song "Possum Blues". The album debuted at No. 1 on the iTunes and Amazon comedy charts. Mo' Possum Blues takes its title from Alexander's unusual pets—he has taken in several semidomesticated opossums that have been injured and can no longer safely live in the wild. One is featured on the album cover.

=== Film and television ===
Alexander was featured in the Memphis episode of the Comedy Central stand-up series Kevin Hart Presents: Hart of the City in 2017. He has also appeared on ABC's Politically Incorrect with Bill Maher, Comedy Central's Laugh Riot, '.

He played a prison librarian in the 1998 psychological thriller A Letter from Death Row, written, directed and starring Poison frontman Bret Michaels.

He played both a shriner and the shriner's wife in the video for the Ray Stevens song "Shriner's Convention", which appeared in Stevens' 1995 movie Get Serious.

== Discography ==
- Mo Files (2000)
- Evolution (2006)
- Nappy Headed Hoes and Other FCC Infractions (2008)
- Just in Case the Mayans are Right (2012)
- Got Clots (2016)
- Possum Blues (original mix) 7" single (Stand Up! Records, 2022)
- Mo’ Possum Blues (Stand Up! Records, 2022)

== Filmography ==
=== Film ===
- Get Serious (1995)
- A Letter from Death Row (1998)

=== Television ===
- Politically Incorrect with Bill Maher (1999)
- Kevin Hart Presents: Hart of the City: Memphis (2017)
- Punching Below the Bible Belt (2020)

=== Selected podcast appearances ===
- Big Time Podcast (October 17, 2017)
- Gender Fluids, "Mo Alexander: An Old School Kinky Dude" (October 3, 2018)
- The Orbit Spaceman Show (June 6, 2019)
- Memphis Famous Podcast, Episode 2 (March 30, 2020)
- Learning to Fail, Episode 40 (May 5, 2020)
- Alert Spoilers, Episode 9 (June 29, 2020)
- Jon D. Podcast, Episode 16 (September 8, 2020) and Episode 45 (September 13, 2022)
- The Dork Forest, Episode 686 (August 16, 2022)
- Behind the Bits Podcast, Episode 122 (September 7, 2022)
