= Darryl Lenox =

American stand-up comedian (1966–2023)

Darryl O’Flynn Lenox
- Born: January 28, 1966; Las Vegas, Nevada, U.S.
- Died: April 16, 2023 (aged 57); Vancouver, British Columbia, Canada

Comedy career
- Years active: 1989–2023
- Medium: Stand-up comedy
- Website: www.darryllenox.com

Darryl O’Flynn Lenox (January 28, 1966 – April 16, 2023) was an American comedian who lived in Vancouver, British Columbia, Canada.

His comedy was notable for its focus on the differences between Canadians and Americans, and on his struggle with blindness. His 34-year career included appearances on Conan, WTF with Marc Maron, and This American Life. Lenox released two albums on Stand Up! Records, 2012's Blind Ambition and 2021's Super Bloom. Stage Time Magazine named Blind Ambition one of the top 5 comedy albums of 2012.

Vancouver comedy writer Guy MacPherson called Lenox “one of the best comics this city—and country—has ever produced”. Georgia Straight writer Chris Griffin called him "a giant" of Canadian comedy.

== Early life ==
Lenox was born and raised in Las Vegas, Nevada. His father was a Vietnam War veteran who left when Lenox was four; he and his four sisters were raised by his mother and stepfather. Despite childhood nearsightedness, Lenox was a talented athlete who wanted to be a professional basketball player.

As a teenager, Lenox moved to Seattle, where his biological father lived. He first performed stand-up at an open mic at Seattle's Comedy Underground.

Lenox also lived in Los Angeles, New York City, and Florida, but thought of Vancouver as home. Most of his early stand-up career was in Canada.

== Career ==
Vancouver newspaper The Georgia Straight described Lenox's comedy as "part philosophical, part therapeutic, part inspirational." His inspirations included Richard Pryor, George Carlin, Chris Rock, and Dave Chappelle, as well as Seattle comic Rod Long and Canadian comic Brent Butt.

He moved to Vancouver in 1994. The tone of his comedy shifted when he found that jokes about American racial issues were often lost on Canadian audiences. He became entrenched in the Vancouver comedy scene, including mentoring then-13-year-old Seth Rogen, who later said that Lenox was a crucial influence on his film Superbad; Lenox narrated the story in the audio version of Rogen's memoir Year Book. He was kicked out of Canada in 2005 for an alleged work permit violation, but returned in 2010 after the issue was determined to have been a mistake.

Lenox headlined regularly at comedy clubs and festivals across the United States, Canada, the United Kingdom, and Australia. Lenox was the winner of the Seattle International Comedy Competition in 1999. He won second place at both the 2000 San Francisco Comedy Competition and the 2006 Boston Comedy Festival. He also performed at SXSW, Winnipeg Comedy Festival, Great American Comedy Festival, Montreal's Just for Laughs Festival, HBO U.S. Comedy Arts Festival, Chicago Comedy Festival, Foolproof Northwest Comedy Arts Festival, Puget Sound Naval Shipyard Comedy Challenge, and Vancouver Comedy Festival.

His television appearances included Conan O'Brien's Conan, The Late Late Show with Craig Ferguson, BET's ComicView, A&E’s Evening at the Improv, Comedy Central Presents, Live at Gotham, and Jamie Foxx’s Laffapalooza. He was a celebrity judge twice on Canadian series Get Cooking With the Stars.

In 2013, he was interviewed on Marc Maron's podcast WTF with Marc Maron.

In 2022, Lenox appeared on an episode of This American Life to discuss how going blind shifted his trust in strangers. The appearance led to a book deal, which he was working on before his death.

Lenox was a guest panelist six times on Canadian radio comedy show The Debaters.

He wrote and performed a one-man show, DNA, at several festivals; it won the Vancouver Fringe Festival’s Best New Play award. HBO expressed interest in turning DNA into a sitcom.

In 2019, Lenox founded the entertainment company Ellison Rains.

=== Recordings ===
Lenox released two albums on Stand Up! Records, 2012's Blind Ambition and 2021's Super Bloom.

Lenox filmed Blind Ambition at Vancouver’s Vogue Theatre in October 2010. It was picked up by the Starz TV network. Stage Time Magazine named Blind Ambition one of the top 5 comedy albums of 2012, calling it "one of the most complete experiences in comedy this year". Jake Austen of Roctober called Lenox a "truly gifted comic" and praised his ability to "address mortality, race, personal failings and triumphs, what it means to be an American and what it means to be a human in very funny, touching terms." Blind Ambition was also named one of the year's best by The Serious Comedy Site; writer Richard Lanoie wrote that "Lenox delivers wickedly funny self-deprecating stories about himself, a hilarious and laser-sharp take on the Canadians he lived with for quite a few years".

Lenox named his 2021 album Super Bloom after the desert phenomenon of sudden, massive blossoming of flowers after heavy rains. It reached No.1 on the iTunes comedy chart. Shawn Conner of the Vancouver Sun praised the album's positivity, saying "If there's a theme, it's that there is usually a silver lining somewhere. "

== Personal life ==
Lenox was married twice. He divorced his first wife in 1994. His second wife was Clair Reilly-Roe, a musician; they divorced in 2019.

=== Blindness ===
Lenox was nearsighted from birth and became legally blind as a teen. His sight deteriorated, exacerbated by an injury in 1997. Despite surgery that restored his sight for several years, he became totally blind in early 2021. He worked with Third World Eye Care Society, a charity devoted to helping the visually impaired in impoverished nations.

== Death ==
Lenox died of an aortic dissection on April 16, 2023, at Vancouver General Hospital.

== Discography ==
- Blind Ambition (Stand Up! Records, 2012)
- Super Bloom (Stand Up! Records, 2021)

== Selected filmography ==
- Talent Talk (2022)
- Just For Laughs: All Access (2014)
- Get Cooking With the Stars (2012, 2017)
- When Comedy Went To School (2013)
- Conan (2013)
- Darryl Lenox: Blind Ambition (2012; also executive producer, writer)
- Alone Up There (2012)
- Live at Gotham (2006)
- Jamie Foxx's Laffapalooza (2005)
- Just For Laughs (2003)
- Comedy Night in Canada (2003)
- BET's Comic View (2003)
- An Evening at the Improv (1992, 1994)

== Selected podcasts ==
- WTF with Marc Maron (February 2013)
- Too Opinionated (February 7, 2022)
- The Reel World: Talkin' with Members of the Entertainment Industry (April 3, 2022)
- AT Banter (August 11, 2021)
- Everything Film (October 22, 2021)
- Middle of Somewhere (December 20, 2021)
