= Whitney Chitwood =

American stand-up comedian

- Occupation: Stand-up comedian
- Years active: 2010s-present
- Website: whitneychitwood.com

Whitney Chitwood is a stand-up comedian from Chicago. Her debut album, 2019's The Bakery Case, was produced by Grammy winner Dan Schlissel for Stand Up! Records. It reached No. 9 on the Billboard Comedy Albums chart, and No. 1 on the iTunes and Amazon comedy charts.

== Early life ==
Chitwood grew up in a small town near Peoria, Illinois. As a child, Chitwood was heavily involved in the stage-theater world; both her parents ran theaters, and she spent much of her childhood around the stage, as well as her grandfather's farm. She performed in her first show at six months old.

== Career ==
She studied theater in college but left early to pursue an acting career in New York City, then decided to focus on stand-up comedy at age 21. She worked as a comic in New York and Los Angeles before settling in Chicago. Her comedy is sometimes surreal and often deals with political topics and LGBT issues like sexuality and gender identity, but also personal issues like infidelity and her relatives in rural Illinois.

A regular performer at the Chicago Laugh Factory, Chitwood has also appeared at the Altercation Comedy Festival, Riot LA, Hollywood Improv, and Milwaukee Riverwest Femfest. She is a frequent contributor to live "audio magazine" Paper Machete at Chicago's Green Mill Cocktail Lounge, as well as the WCPT radio show Out Chicago, and has written for the magazine Playbill. She has performed with Eddie Pepitone, Adam Conover, and River Butcher.

Chitwood's album, The Bakery Case, is named for the Supreme Court case Masterpiece Cakeshop v. Colorado Civil Rights Commission, which dealt with whether a business could refuse service to LGBT clientele due to religious belief. It was recorded live at the Green Mill. A reviewer for comedy website The Interrobang praised the album, saying that with "her chronic chainsmoker voice and a jawline that could take down an oak tree ... it's clear that Whitney's a force to reckon with in the comedy world."

She appeared in a 2019 episode of the NBC TV series Chicago P.D.

She hosts the podcast Is This Us? with Chicago comic Carly Ballerini.

== Discography ==
- The Bakery Case (Stand Up! Records, 2019)

== Other work ==
=== Podcast appearances ===
Is This Us? with Whitney Chitwood and Carly Ballerini (2020)
Dope Ass Podcast, "How To Break Into Comedy With Whitney Chitwood" (December 13, 2019)
Talking During Movies, Episode 113: Comedian and new friend Whitney Chitwood and I Talk Over Alien (April 2020)
Chad the Bird, Whitpocalypse! (April 11, 2020)
Busted Mouth, Episode 67: Whitney Chitwood (November 12, 2019)
Lossano and Friends, Episode 126: Whitney Chitwood and Stephanie Weber (September 10, 2019)
Performance Revue, Whitney Chitwood (July 22, 2019)
Probably Science, Episode 309: Whitney Chitwood and Carly Ballerini (September 28, 2018)
Wingcast: Wingman Podcast, Episode 11: Wingmen to a Gay Woman with Jayson Cross & Whitney Chitwood (September 27, 2017)
