= Poppin' the Hood! =

Studio album by The Sklar Bros.
- Released: February 10, 2004
- Genre: Comedy
- Length: 55:23
- Label: Stand Up! Records

The Sklar Bros. chronology
Poppin' the Hood! (2004)	Sklar Maps (2007)

Poppin' the Hood! is the debut stand-up comedy album by the Sklar Brothers, released in 2004 by Stand Up! Records.

The album was recorded in 2003 at Acme Comedy Company in Minneapolis.

== Track listing ==
1. "Magic" -8:18
2. "Local Commercial" -5:59
3. "Network Logos" -4:23
4. "Where are They Now" -1:57
5. "Morning Zoo" -1:43
6. "KSHE95" -3:16
7. "Hector" -3:18
8. "Girls Gone Wild" -2:52
9. "Bowflex" -2:59
10. "Feldenkrais" -0:57
11. "Walk With Israel" -1:05
12. "Dad" -5:36
13. "Guiltor" -2:12
14. "Strip Club DJ" -2:44
15. "Power 106" -1:50
16. "Local News Car Chase" -3:03
17. "Chopper 4" -3:11
