= Dave Williamson =

American stand-up comedian

- Born: Miami, Florida
- Occupation: Stand-up comedian
- Website: davewilliamsoncomedy.com

Dave Williamson is a stand-up comedian from Miami, Florida now living in El Segundo, California. Williamson was named "best comedian in Miami" in 2012 by Miami New Times, which called his comedy "unpretentious, genuinely interesting, and, most important, atomically funny" and "like the stand-up version of a great sitcom."

== Early life ==
Williamson grew up in Miami, where his family sold automobiles. He graduated from the College of Business at Auburn University in Alabama in 2000, then moved to Charlotte, North Carolina, where he began performing in comedy clubs. He moved back to Miami to join the family business, but within a few years had segued into stand-up comedy full-time.

== Career ==
Williamson performs comedy across the country, touring frequently. He has opened for Jim Gaffigan, Lewis Black and Jimmy Fallon. Daniel Berkowitz of The Spit Take wrote that "Williamson approaches every event, obstacle and conversation with a palpable sense of awe—a childlike naiveté that is utterly charming and wholly endearing."

He founded the Gundo Comedy Festival in El Segundo, which started in 2015. Headliners have included Preacher Lawson and Bert Kreischer.

Williamson is the host of two podcasts. Since 2018, he has hosted Meat Dave, a weekly podcast in which he talks with comedians and restaurateurs about barbecue. (An enthusiastic aficionado, Williamson's tour bus is equipped with a portable BBQ smoker.) In 2020, he began co-hosting The Tony Azevedo Podcast with five-time Olympian water polo player Tony Azevedo.

He has released two albums produced by Grammy winner Dan Schlissel for his label Stand Up! Records, Thicker Than Water and Trying My Hardest. Rating Thicker Than Water 4 out of 5 stars, Kaitlin Costello of Stage Time Magazine called it "goofy, witty, and easily relatable." Richard Lanoie of The Serious Comedy Site called Trying My Hardest a "quirky take on fatherhood (that) is a breath of fresh and original air."

== Discography ==
- Thicker Than Water (Stand Up! Records, 2012)
- Trying My Hardest (Stand Up! Records, 2019)
