= Lashonda Lester =

American stand-up comedian, 1975–2017

- Born: September 11, 1975; Detroit, Michigan, U.S.
- Died: April 6, 2017 (aged 41); Austin, Texas, U.S.
- Occupation: Stand-up comedian
- Years active: 2008–2017

Lashonda Lester (September 11, 1975—April 6, 2017) was an American stand-up comedian from Austin, Texas. Her posthumous debut album, Shondee Superstar, was released by Dan Schlissel's Stand Up! Records in 2019, and was critically praised. John-Michael Bond of Paste magazine called her "a rare talent with a preternatural gift for razor-sharp storytelling." Marc Maron called her a "funny, authentic, hard-working comic who had her own voice... That’s an honest comic. The best kind."

== Early life ==
Lester was born in Detroit, Michigan on September 11, 1975. She was a precocious reader and performer from a young age, and was giving the announcements at her local church at age 4. As a child, she was a voiceover actress in local commercials. She developed an early interest in comedy, memorizing routines by Redd Foxx, Slappy White, George Carlin, and Richard Pryor. She worked various jobs, including as a wrestling promoter and a madam.

== Career ==
Lester moved to Austin in 2004 to work in politics and marketing, and began performing stand-up in 2008 while trying to start a magazine about Austin nightlife. She became known for creating and starring in the darkly comic biography series Weird! True Hollywood Tales, which ran for five seasons at Austin's Salvage Vanguard Theater.

She performed frequently on television, including NickMom Night Out in 2013, the PBS series Stand Up Empire in 2016, and Fox's Laughs in 2017. She was one of the top 100 comics on season 9 of the NBC show Last Comic Standing in 2015.

In 2016, Lester won the prestigious annual "Funniest Person in Austin" competition at Austin's Cap City Comedy Club, becoming the first black comedian to win the award. Her win was captured in the 2016 documentary Funniest, directed by Katie Pengra and Dustin Svehlak. In 2016, the Austin Chronicle gave Lester a special award in its Best of 2016 issue, "Best Unstoppable Comedy Dynamo".

Lester was increasingly well known nationally when she died in 2017. She had recently received critical praise for a high-profile performance with Marc Maron and was due to record her first special for the TV series Comedy Central Stand-Up Presents later that year. Several national publications, including Paste and Vulture, published lengthy obituaries after her death.

A posthumous album, Shondee Superstar, was released by Stand Up! Records in 2019. It was compiled by Stand Up!'s Dan Schlissel from three performances by Lester at Austin's Velveeta Room in 2016 and 2017. Shondee Superstar was well received by critics. Writing in Paste, Bond called the album "a lovely introduction to a voice that’s both purely unique and universally relatable." Valerie Lopez and Lara Smith of Comedy Wham called the album "superb" and praised Lester's "knack for storytelling" and ability to "turn a simple phrase with perfect timing and absolutely slay an audience." The album was later reissued as part of Stand Up! Records' anniversary box set The Headliners in 2024.

== Personal life ==
Lester and her husband, Dana, had a son, born in 2006.

== Health issues and death ==
Lester was diagnosed with a chronic kidney disease in 2015, and had been hospitalized prior to her death. She underwent dialysis four times a week, often using the time to write new material. After winning the Funniest Person In Austin award, she wore the crown and cape she'd been given to the next morning's dialysis session.

Professional ratings
Review scores
| Source | Rating |
|---|---|
| Paste | 8.5/10 stars |

== Discography ==
- Shondee Superstar (Stand Up! Records, 2019)

== Podcast appearances ==
Comedy Wham, "Lashonda Lester: The Kitten From Murder Mitten" (April 19, 2016)
The Savage and Starbuck Show, "A Conversation With Lashonda Lester" (Oct. 23, 2014)
