= Wendy Maybury =

American stand-up comedian

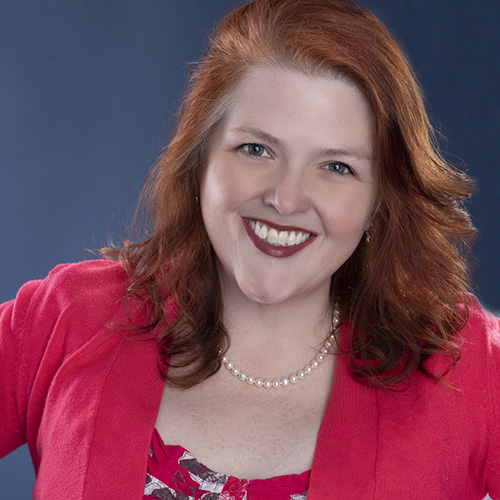
- Born: 1974 or 1975 (age 50–51); Japan
- Occupation(s): Stand-up comedian, photographer
- Years active: 2013-present
- Website: www.wendymaybury.com

Wendy Maybury (born 1974 or 1975) is a stand-up comedian and photographer from Minneapolis, Minnesota. Her debut album She's Not From Around Here, produced by Grammy winner Dan Schlissel, was released June 26, 2020 on Stand Up! Records, and reached No. 1 on the Amazon comedy chart.

== Early life ==
A self-described "military brat," Maybury was born in Japan and lived in Virginia, Alabama, Germany and other places growing up, and went to high schools in four different cities. Her family is from Alabama. Her grandfather worked as a clown, and her uncle was a magician. Maybury graduated from James Madison University in Virginia with a degree in teaching and Hallmark Institute of Photography.

== Career ==
=== Photography ===
A professional photographer, Maybury worked with prominent artist Mary Ellen Mark as well as fashion photographer Jerry Avenaim. She worked as a ship's photographer on a Mississippi River cruise ship between Minneapolis and New Orleans.

=== Comedy ===
After living in New York City and Los Angeles as a photographer, Maybury moved to Minneapolis, where she began performing stand-up in 2013. Her early material revolved around her life as a 310-pound single woman. After losing weight and becoming pregnant, she worried that her comedy career was over, but Louie Anderson encouraged her to continue, telling her that motherhood would be a rich source of jokes. Her material has since evolved to focus on family and parenthood. Since 2017, she has co-hosted Day Drinking with Mom, a standup showcase focusing on parenting. From 2014 to 2017, she was the co-host of Dead Fans Talking, a podcast for fans of The Walking Dead.

== Discography ==
- She's Not From Around Here (Stand Up! Records, 2020)

== Other work ==
=== Podcast appearances ===
Dead Fans Talking, episodes 1-90 (2014-2017)
The Art of Bombing, Episode 133: Wendy Maybury (May 12, 2020)
Success Champions, "Wendy Maybury: How Comedy Helps You Show Up Authentically" (May 12, 2020)
The BS Show, Episode 1,132: Wendy Maybury (May 8, 2020)
Mill City Comedy Greenroom, Episode 17: Wendy Maybury (Jan. 30, 2020)
The Tom Barnard Podcast, Episode 1234-1: Wendy Maybury (Sept. 28, 2017)
PF's Tape Recorder, Episode 270: Wendy Maybury (Sept. 17, 2016)
Dogbrain with Andrew Cahak, Episode 11: Wendy Maybury (Jan. 19, 2014)
