= Chris Knutson =

American stand-up comedian

- Born: 1982 or 1983 (age 42–43)
- Occupation: Stand-up comedian
- Years active: 2006-present
- Known for: Valley Meadows

Chris Knutson is an American stand-up comedian from Minneapolis, Minnesota. He is known for his work as half of the comedy-rap duo Valley Meadows. Patrick Strait of City Pages said that "Knutson has established himself as one of the most consistently funny performers" in the Midwest.

Knutson has released three albums on Stand Up! Records, most recently 2021's Rewound.

== Career ==
Knutson began performing improv comedy in 2006, and stand-up in 2009. He won Acme Comedy Company's "Funniest Person in the Twin Cities" contest in 2010. His comedy style is sometimes experimental, veering away from traditional first-person stand-up to blend in sketchwork or perform as a character, often one who does not realize he is bad at stand-up. He has toured nationally and performed at comedy festivals including 10,000 Laughs and Gilda's LaughFest. Vincent Terrace, reviewing the series in his book Internet Comedy Television Series, 1997-2015, felt that "the characterizations are a bit rough" but called the series "an interesting idea about two friends just trying to get by."

Knutson formed Valley Meadows in 2008 with Zach Coulter. The duo perform in character as substitute teacher Gary Shinchenshenzenski and MC Tom Johnson, who try to become rap stars in a foolish attempt to earn respect, with songs about unlikely topics such as ice cream, karate, and Paul Reiser. The duo also starred in an online video series, Valley Meadows, in 2014, which Knutson wrote. The syndicated newspaper column In Focus praised the series as "capable of going anywhere". The webseries was nominated for four awards at the 2015 Los Angeles Web Series Festival: Outstanding Comedy Series, Outstanding Writing, Outstanding Lead Actor (for Knutson), and Outstanding Guest Actor (for Dan Susmilch). In 2012, laughspin.com nominated Valley Meadows for its Readers Choice Award for Best Musical Comedy Act. Vincent Terrace, reviewing the series in his book Internet Comedy Television Series, 1997-2015, felt that "the characterizations are a bit rough" but called the series "an interesting idea about two friends just trying to get by."

Knutson was also a founding member of sketch comedy group The Turkeys.

Knutson and his wife had a son in 2014, and fatherhood quickly become a main topic of his comedy. A stop-motion video Knutson made of his son's teddy bear meeting the baby for the first time went viral, receiving more than 2 million views on YouTube and national coverage on ABC News, the Associated Press, and other news media. Another video series, Baby Cop, followed in 2014–15.

=== Albums ===
Knutson has released three albums on Stand Up! Records. His solo stand-up album Rewound was recorded at Sisyphus Brewing in Minneapolis in 2015 and released in 2021. Valley Meadows released a self-titled album in 2012. Jake Austen of Roctober magazine called it "white-guy rap absurdity [that's] amusing even if the form is flawed." Knutson was also part of the Stand Up!-released group album Nerd Alert!, a compilation of Minnesota comics riffing on science fiction and other geek-friendly topics. Austen called Nerd Alert! "a product of [Minneapolis'] impressive comedy scene [that] is something that town can be very proud of."

== Discography ==
- Chris Knutson, Rewound (Stand Up! Records, 2021)
- Valley Meadows, Valley Meadows (Stand Up! Records, 2012)
- Various Artists, Nerd Alert! (Stand Up! Records, 2011)
