= -ismist Recordings =

American record label founded in Nebraska

- Founded: 1992; 34 years ago
- Founder: Dan Schlissel
- Defunct: 2002; 24 years ago
- Genre: Indie rock, punk rock, metal, rap, ska, singer-songwriter, comedy
- Country of origin: U.S.
- Location: Lincoln, Nebraska and Minneapolis, Minnesota
- Official website: www.ismista.com

-ismist Recordings was an American independent record label founded in 1992 by Dan Schlissel. Over the 1990s, -ismist released nearly 80 albums and singles by bands including Killdozer, Season to Risk, and House of Large Sizes. It was based in Lincoln, Nebraska, United States. It is most widely known for comedy albums by Lewis Black and Doug Stanhope, as well as Iowa metal band Slipknot's 1996 debut/demo, Mate.Feed.Kill.Repeat. By the early 2000s, after Slipknot had moved on to major label Roadrunner Records and Schlissel had found greater success with comedians like Black and Stanhope than with indie rock, he changed his focus to comedy albums on a new, Minneapolis-based label, Stand Up! Records, which eventually replaced -ismist entirely.

== History ==
In 1988, Schlissel was a student at the University of Nebraska–Lincoln, where he majored in physics, worked at an off-campus record store called Feedback, and booked concerts for the university as chairman of the concert and dance committee. In 1992, inspired by the success of indie music labels such as Sub Pop, he founded the label which would eventually become -ismist Recordings, at first basing the business out of his dorm room at the university. The label's original name, -ism, was short for "In Spite of Myself" and was also meant to embrace a wide diversity of art and philosophy. In 1996, Schlissel changed the name to -ismist, short for "In Spite of Myself, In Spite of Them," after New York punk band Ism objected that the original name was too similar to its own.

The label's first record, released in late 1992, was Nebraska indie-rock band Such Sweet Thunder's Redneck, a CD which also included the band's previous self-released album Burning Ditches. A review by Allmusic's Jason Birchmeier called it "a dizzying retrospective" by a band that made "a lasting, influential impression on the healthy '90s Nebraskan indie rock scene," and also noted that as the first -ismist release, the album "becomes even more noteworthy, functioning as the foundation for that label's healthy growth during the '90s."

This was followed by other local Lincoln groups such as Floating Opera, Honeyboy Turner, Fullblown, and Polecat. Instead of confining itself to a single genre, -ismist's catalog ranged across musical styles, including punk rock, ska, singer-songwriter, rap, metal, and alternative rock. In 1996, it released Madison, Wisconsin noise-rock band Killdozer's final 7-inch single, Go Big Red, featuring the songs "Sonnet '96" and a Hank Williams cover, "I Saw The Light." Other notable -ismist releases included the vinyl edition of Cedar Falls, Iowa, alt-rock band House of Large Sizes' album Glass Cockpit, and the 1999 split 7-inch single '"Ace of Space"/"Tall and Thin Hit Men", split between Kansas City bands Season to Risk and Molly McGuire. Schlissel, via -ismist, also distributed other Nebraska and Midwestern indie labels, including Speed Nebraska Records, Corn Pie Records, and Two Olive Martini Records, and organized two music festivals in 1996 and 1997.

In an effort to document the Nebraska music scene as a whole, -ismist also released two compilation records, 1994's LINOMA: A Nebraska Compilation and 1999's LINOMA II: Riot on the Plains, which Allmusic's Birchmeier called "an excellent summation of the harsh sound so prevalent in the '90s Nebraskan indie rock scene" and "an excellent beginning point for anyone interested in the surprisingly deep pool of Nebraskan bands recording otherwise largely ignored hard indie rock."

One -ismist release, Omaha, Nebraska band Polecat's 2500 Ft of Our Love, even inspired the name of another music label when its A-side single, "Saddle Creek," was used for Omaha label Saddle Creek Records.

=== Slipknot ===
After meeting Shawn "Clown" Crahan of Iowa metal band Slipknot at Crahan's Des Moines bar Safari Club, Schlissel helped the group release its first album, Mate.Feed.Kill.Repeat, which it had originally self-pressed. Schlissel and -ismist distributed the last third of the 1,000-copy run of the album, and helped the band get its first significant notice from music critics and radio airplay. (Original pressings of the album have since grown in value considerably among collectors.) Slipknot later signed with major label Roadrunner Records, ending their relationship with -ismist.

=== Lewis Black and the move to Stand Up! Records ===
After the loss of Slipknot and other setbacks in the late 1990s, Schlissel became disillusioned with running a music label, and moved away from Nebraska in 1998 to take a job at a software company. Schlissel told one interviewer, "The label started to disintegrate because bands eventually break up or move away, and at the same time I relocated to Minneapolis." He considered folding -ismist, but instead found new focus after convincing Lewis Black to work with him after meeting the comedian after a show in Minneapolis.

Schlissel recorded Black's The White Album in Madison, Wisconsin, in 1999, with John Machnik, who would be his production partner for many years. Released on -ismist, the album was an immediate success, eventually selling around 60,000 copies, more than the entire previous -ismist catalog combined. Schlissel decided to reinvent -ismist entirely, moving from indie-rock and punk to comedy. The label would go on to release several other comedy albums, including two by Doug Stanhope, Sicko and Something to Take the Edge Off, and Jimmy Shubert's Animal Instincts, while Schlissel launched a new label, Stand Up! Records, in 2000. By 2002, -ismist had effectively closed down and been replaced by Stand Up! Records. Schlissel has occasionally revived the -ismist name, such as for the 2006 tribute compilation We Will Bury You: A Tribute to Killdozer.

== Discography ==
1992
- Such Sweet Thunder, Redneck/Burning Ditches

1993

- Greg Markel, Bloodcake
- Urethra Franklin, Power Peach
- Water, Water
- Greg Markel, "Crash Pansy" (7-inch single)
- Hour Slave, Begin

1994

- Various artists, LINOMA: A Nebraska Compilation
- Honeyboy Turner, Preachin' the Blues
- Young Executives, Cottonwood
- Polecat, "2500 ft. of Our Love" (7-inch single)

1995

- Pop Sickle, "1977 Owner's Manual" (7-inch single)
- Todd Grant, Strangled Soul
- Stew, Lower
- Ritual Device, "Rabe" (7-inch single)
- Fun Chicken, I'm Drinking Your Spinal Fluid
- The Sissies, Songs from the Sack
- Plastik Trumpet, Are You P.T.?
- Frontier Trust, Speed Nebraska
- Honeyboy Turner Band, Live at the Zoo
- Ritual Device, Trademark of Quality

1996

- Killdozer, Go Big Red ("Sonnet '96" b/w "I Saw The Light")
- Red Max, "Voodoo Liquor Hot Rod" (7-inch single)
- Beyond, "Game of Death" (cassette single)
- Rascal Basket, vs. the Hordes of Venus
- Sawdust Devil, Affirmative
- Slipknot, Mate. Feed. Kill. Repeat.
- The Return, Greatest Demos vol. 1
- Plastik Trumpet, "Are You P.T.? EP" (7-inch single)
- Floating Opera, Everybody's Somebody's Monster

1997

- The Lost Dogs, The Lost Dogs
- Richard Schultz, "Foreshadows" (7-inch single)
- Ravine, Ravine
- Clayface Regular, "Clayface Regular" (7-inch single)
- Solid Jackson, "Fell" (7-inch single)
- D is for Dragster, "Chrysler Solid State" (7-inch single)
- Wide & Stew, The Perfect Gift / Karma Suture (split LP)
- Scrid, The Island of Misfit Toys
- Jimmy Skaffa, "Bitch on Sunday" (7-inch single)
- The Return, "High Enough Yet?" (CD single)
- Row 8 Plot 30, Dowsers
- Fullblown, Fullblown

1998

- Mimi Schneider, Catasterpiece
- Wide, Hidden Agenda
- Sean Benjamin, Delta Blue Coffee
- Gladhands, "Do You Have a Reservation?" (7-inch single)
- Fullblown, "Clowns in Action" (7-inch single)
- House of Large Sizes, Glass Cockpit
- Kung Pao / Tucker, "Nakoma" b/w "Trailer Pumpkin Fuss" (split 7-inch single)
- Sputnik, Favorite Songs of the Soviet Cosmonauts
- Various artists, It's Craptacular

1999

- Season to Risk & Molly McGuire, Tour 7" 7-inch single ("Ace of Space" b/w "Tall and Thin Hit Men")
- The Return, the/return
- Scrid & Sludgeplow, "Miss L" b/w "Passion Fruit" (split 7-inch single)
- Various artists, LINOMA II: Riot on the Plains
- Floating Opera, It's Not Easy Listening Anymore
- Beyond, Droppin' the Next Shit
- Fullblown, Agents of Entropy
- The Return, "She's Got It Coming" (CD single)

2000

- Graig Markel, "July" (7-inch single)
- Kung Pao, Bogota
- Plastik Trumpet, "I Love You So Much I Could Vomit" (CD single)
- Ninja School, "Choking Hazard" (7-inch single)
- Lewis Black,The White Album
- Doug Stanhope, Sicko
- Doug Stanhope, Something to Take the Edge Off
- Entertainment, "Shake" b/w "Pretty Lips are Red" (7-inch single)

2001

- Fifty Tons of Black Terror (aka Penthouse), "Hungry Hollow" (7-inch single)
- Jimmy Shubert, Animal Instincts
- Sofa Kit XL, Day of the Race
- Pioneer Disaster, "Bootstraps" b/w "Cactus Town" (7-inch single)

2002

- The Monroes, "Kiss Your Elbow Goodbye" (7-inch single)
- The Return, 3
- Kung Pao, Sheboygan
- Wide, Gay

2003

- Sofa Kit XL, Heated Electronic Break-Up

2006

- Various artists, We Will Bury You: A Tribute to Killdozer
