= Jay Chanoine =

American stand-up comedian

- Born: 1985 or 1986 (age 39–40)
- Occupation: Stand-up comedian
- Years active: 2009-present

Jay Chanoine is a stand-up comedian from Manchester, New Hampshire. He has released three albums, including 2019's The Texas Chanoinesaw Massacre and 2025's Chanoinigans, both produced by Grammy winner Dan Schlissel for Stand Up! Records.

== Career ==
Chanoine started performing stand-up comedy in 2009. He was recognized by New Hampshire Public Radio's Word of Mouth program as one of the top comics in the state, saying that "Jay has loads of talent. He's funny. He's got personality. And there's that feeling he might make something of this." New Hampshire weekly The Hippo called his comedy "edgy" and noted that Chanoine's favorite topics included "alt rock, Teenage Mutant Ninja Turtles and his ability to fit into his wife’s clothes." He is featured in director Lisa Romagnoli's 2013 documentary Wicked Funny 2, an exploration of the New Hampshire comedy scene.

Chanoine has performed at comedy festivals including the Altercation Comedy Festival in Austin, Texas, and the B4uDie Fest in Alaska. He has toured frequently with Austin, Texas comic JT Habersaat, and performed with Kyle Kinane, Myq Kaplan and Sam Jay.

He is a contributing writer for satirical website The Hard Times.

In 2022, Chanoine and Jay Wulff produced a 14-episode podcast series, "Weird Al"Bums, covering each of "Weird Al" Yankovic's studio albums. Guests included Eddie Pepitone and Nathan Rabin, with a cameo from Yankovic himself in the final episode.

Chanoine co-wrote and starred in the 2023 short film You Make Me Wanna Rock!, which won five awards at the Boston 48 Hour Film Festival, including Best Acting for Chanoine. He also co-wrote and starred in the 2025 short film Resigning, which won four awards including Best Actor for Chanoine at the Portland, Maine, 48 Hour Film Festival.

=== Albums ===
Chanoine self-released his first album Come On Feel Chanoine in 2015, whose title puns off of the Slade/Quiet Riot song "Cum On Feel the Noize." It was recorded live at Manchester's Shaskeen Pub in 2015.

His 2019 followup album The Texas Chanoinesaw Massacre was released by Stand Up! Records. Reviewer Richard Lanoie of the Serious Comedy Site called it "surreal but very, very believable. Also excellent." He wrote that, "At a time when biographical stand-up comedy seems generally banal at best, Jay Chanoine’s material stands out for how well it is written and how different it is." It reached No. 1 on the Amazon comedy chart.

Chanoine's third album, Chanoinigans, was released by Stand Up! Records on October 17, 2025, and as a video special later that month. It was recorded at Empire Comedy Club in Portland, Maine in 2024. In interviews about the album, Chanoine said that the Covid-19 pandemic in 2020 derailed his plans to record the album earlier, forcing him to rewrite much of his material in response to the long shutdown of live comedy shows. "I had to remember how to do stand up again," he said in an interview with the New Hampshire alt-weekly The Hippo. The album also deals with changes in Chanoine's own life, such as his 2024 autism diagnosis, which happened only a month before recording, making him realize belatedly how much of his comedy is about being autistic: "You could draw lines from almost every one of those bits I was about to record," he told The Hippo. Critic Richard Lanoie of The Serious Comedy Site reviewed the album positively, writing that "Chanoine gives me hope there are still stand-ups out there who do more than mail it in."

== Discography ==
- Come On Feel Chanoine (Self-released, 2015)
- The Texas Chanoinesaw Massacre (Stand Up! Records, 2019)
- Chanoinigans (Stand Up! Records, 2025)
