= Something to Take the Edge Off =

Live album by Doug Stanhope
- Released: August 4, 2000
- Recorded: May 21, 2000
- Venue: The Laff Stop (Houston, TX)
- Genre: Comedy
- Length: 56:20
- Label: -ismist Recordings

Doug Stanhope chronology
Sicko (1999)	Something to Take the Edge Off (2000)	Die Laughing (2002)

Professional ratings
Review scores
Source	Rating
AllMusic	2/5 stars

Something to Take the Edge Off is the third comedy album by Doug Stanhope, released in 2000 by Stand Up! Records and recorded live at The Laff Stop comedy club in Houston, Texas. The album features a musical accompaniment by Henry Phillips on acoustic guitar.

== Track listing ==
1. "Vice" - 6:33
2. "Real Stories" - 2:55
3. "Top Ten Laws" - 1:06
4. "Quitter" - 2:54
5. "Live Life" - 1:04
6. "Suicide" - 3:27
7. "Dead Sport/Behind the Comedy" - 5:20
8. "$16 an hour" - 1:04
9. "Scared Straight" - 1:27
10. "Don’t Pull Your Dick Out" - 1:45
11. "A Matter of Size" - 1:20
12. "Big Rubber Fist" - 2:24
13. "Pace Yourself" - 1:46
14. "Destroying Your Body" - 0:50
15. "Shake the Baby" - 5:02
16. "Freak Shows" - 1:28
17. "Offensive to Midgets" - 3:20
18. "End the Hate" - 2:27
19. "The Tit Fuck Joke in Its Entirety" - 0:45
20. "Excess in Moderation" - 1:47
21. "Bobbie Barnett" - 7:34
