= Dylan Brody =

American comedian (born 1964)

Dylan Brody (born April 24, 1964) is a U.S. humorist, playwright, author and comedian. In 2005 his play Mother May I won the Stanley Drama Award. He has appeared on A&E's Comedy on the Road and Fox TV's Comedy Express and has written for Jay Leno's Tonight Show monologue. He has performed his one-man shows Thinking Allowed and More Arts, Less Martial in many venues around the country and has earned very strong reviews.

He has written two young adult fiction novels: A Tale of a Hero and the Song of her Sword and The Warm Hello. His novel Laughs Last, a semi-autobiographical story about a young standup comedian, was released in 2013 to strong acclaim from both critics and other comedians. He has also written a martial art comedy film, "Kimchi Warrior".

In 2009, he released two CDs of his material. True Enough contains eight of his stories performed live, while Brevity is a studio recording of eight different stories.

His third CD, A Twist of the Wit, was released on February 14, 2011. His fourth, Chronological Disorder, was released on February 21, 2012, and his fifth, Writ Large, was released in April 2013, all to strong critical acclaim. His sixth CD Dylan Goes Electric: Live at The Throckmorton was released in October 2014 by Rooftop Comedy.

Brody is a graduate of Northfield Mount Hermon School and Sarah Lawrence College. In addition to his work as a writer, he has earned the rank of master in several forms of East Asian martial arts, which he continues to teach and study. Brody lives in Los Angeles with his wife.
