= Chris Maddock =

American stand-up comedian

- Born: 1977 or 1978 (age 48–49)
- Occupation: Stand-up comedian
- Years active: 2000s–present
- Children: 1
- Website: chrismaddock.com

Chris Maddock is an American stand-up comedian from Minneapolis, Minnesota. He has released two albums and a DVD on Dan Schlissel's Stand Up! Records, most recently 2020's Country Music Legend, which reached No. 5 on the iTunes comedy chart.

== Early life ==
Maddock is a 1995 graduate of Stillwater Area High School in Minnesota.

== Career ==
Maddock began performing comedy soon after high school. He has toured frequently across the United States and in Mexico. His comedy is often autobiographical. Maddock was the main host of the long-running show Death Comedy Jam at Grumpy's Bar in Minneapolis from 2003 to 2018. An important local showcase, the event also featured nationally known headliners like Maria Bamford, Doug Stanhope, and Andy Kindler. Maddock and the show are profiled in the documentary Death’s Last Stand, filmed during the final performance.

He was named best stand-up comedian in Minneapolis-St. Paul by City Pages in 2014.

Maddock is working on a podcast, Servitude, about working in restaurants, which is planned to debut in 2020.

=== Albums ===
Maddock has released two albums, 2012's Point of Entry and 2020's Country Music Legend. Both were recorded live in Minneapolis, at the 7th Street Entry and Hook & Ladder Theater respectively.

Point of Entry, his debut album, was accompanied by a live DVD, Rookie Mistake. The album was received positively by critics. Ed Placencia of the website Comedy Reviews praised Maddock for his "great sense of balance" in making jokes about extreme topics without being offensive, but also noted that shock only formed a small part of Maddock's act, which draws on what Placencia called an "endless well" of stories about his life and family. Richard Lanoie of The Serious Comedy Site called it "excellent." Jake Austen of Roctober magazine also praised Maddock's ability to find jokes in potentially shocking, offensive topics, calling him "very funny" with a "special, wacky twist."

Country Music Legend was released October 2, 2020. The title came from Maddock's ironic way of introducing himself at clubs, but also reflects that he plays guitar on stage to accompany his jokes with music. The stand-up on the album is bookended by two songs performed by Maddock with a live band.

== Personal life ==
Maddock is married and has a son. His grandfather, Red Maddock, is a jazz drummer who performed with the Butch Thompson Trio and on A Prairie Home Companion.

In 2015, Stillwater, Minnesota, mayor Ted Kozlowski officially decreed April 15 as "Chris Maddock Day" in the city.

== Discography ==
- Point of Entry (Stand Up! Records, 2012)
- Rookie Mistake DVD (Stand Up! Records, 2012)
- Appears on compilation The $4.99 Show (The $9.99 Recording) (Stand Up! Records, 2013)
- Country Music Legend (Stand Up! Records, digital album and video special, 2020)

== Podcast appearances ==
- Brian Oake Show, Episode 94: Chris Maddock (Country Music Legend) (September 25, 2020)
- KQRS Morning Show, Guests Guy Snodgrass, Chris Maddock, Rob Heubel (October 9, 2020)
- How Bad Cast, Chris Maddock's "Point of Entry" (May 21, 2012)
