= Robert Baril =

American stand-up comedian

- Born: 1985 or 1986 (age 38–39); Roseau, Minnesota
- Occupation(s): Stand-up comedian, radio talk-show host
- Years active: 2000s–present
- Website: barilcomedy.com

Robert Baril is a stand-up comedian and radio talk-show host from Minneapolis, Minnesota. He has released two albums on Stand Up! Records, Sex and Politics and TMI, both produced by Grammy winner Dan Schlissel. He was the host of Laughing Matters on AM950 in Minneapolis.

== Early life ==
Baril was born in Roseau, Minnesota and raised in the nearby town of Warroad. He attended Warroad High School, where he first performed in plays and did his first stand-up act. He graduated from Bemidji State University with a degree in political science and philosophy. He moved to Minneapolis in 2009. While launching his stand-up career he worked as a substitute teacher.

== Career ==
Much of Baril's stand-up comedy is informed by his liberal political views, with a style inspired by political comics Dennis Miller, Colin Quinn, and Jon Stewart, as well as Garry Shandling and Carol Burnett. A reviewer for Minneapolis newspaper City Pages called it "a maelstrom of social observation and biting commentary that is as delightfully funny as it is whip-smart." Over time, he has also delved into more personal material such as his engagement to a woman with grandchildren, making him "sort of the acting step-grandpa."

From 2015 to 2019, he hosted the talk-show Laughing Matters, on Minneapolis progressive radio station AM 950 KTNF. He is a regular contributor to the political podcast Filter Free Amerika. He is also half of the sketch duo Lestaril with Twin Cities comic Mike Lester.

He has released two albums, Sex and Politics and TMI. Patrick Strait of The Growler praised TMI's balance of personal and political topics, calling Baril "a comedian who has found his voice."

== Discography ==
- Sex and Politics (Stand Up! Records, 2017)
- TMI (Stand Up! Records, 2019)
