= 2017 in stand-up comedy =

Years in stand-up comedy
- 2015 2016 2017 2018 2019 2020 2021 2022

This is a timeline documenting events and facts about stand-up comedy in the year 2017.

== Events ==
- February 14: Rolling Stone publishes a ranked listicle entitled 50 Best Stand-Up Comics of All Time. Richard Pryor ranks first, considering artistic merit, technical proficiency, sense of timing, quality of written material, delivery and degree of influence.
- February 28: John Caparulo is assaulted by two women from the audience at The Comedy & Magic Club in Hermosa Beach, California, after making a phallic joke about President Donald Trump.

== Deaths ==
- April 6: Lashonda Lester dies of chronic kidney disease at age 41 in Austin, Texas.
- April 6: Don Rickles dies of kidney failure, at the age of 90, at his home in Los Angeles.
- April 12: Charlie Murphy dies at the age of 57 in New York, suffering from leukemia.
- August 19: Dick Gregory dies of heart failure at the age of 84 in Washington.
- August 20: Jerry Lewis dies of cardiovascular disease, at the age of 91, at his home in Las Vegas.
- September 19: Jake LaMotta dies of pneumonia at the age of 95 in Florida.
- October 6: Ralphie May dies of cardiac arrest at the age of 45 in Las Vegas.
- October 16: Sean Hughes dies of cardiac arrest at the age of 51, while also suffering from cirrhosis of the liver.

== Releases ==
=== January ===
- January 3: Jen Kirkman's one-hour special Just Keep Livin’? is released on Netflix. The special was filmed at the Bowery Ballroom in New York.
- January 5: Brian Posehn's one-hour special Posehn 25x2 is released on Seeso. The special was filmed at the Revolution Hall in Portland, Oregon.
- January 6: Janeane Garofalo album version of her October 26 special If I May is released on iTunes, Google Play, Spotify and other digital audio retailers by Comedy Dynamics. The album was recorded in San Francisco, California.
- January 10: Jim Gaffigan's one-hour special Cinco is released on Netflix. The special was filmed at the Palace Theatre in Columbus, Ohio.
- January 13: Kelly MacFarland's album You Woke Up Today is released on iTunes and Amazon by Rooftop Comedy. The album was recorded at the ImprovBoston in Cambridge, Massachusetts.
- January 13: Mo Mandel's album version of his November 2016 special Negative Reinforcement is released on iTunes, Google Play, Spotify and other digital audio retailers by Comedy Dynamics. The album was recorded at the Gothic Theater in Denver, Colorado.
- January 17: Neal Brennan's one-hour special 3 Mics is released on Netflix. The special was filmed at the Belasco Theatre in Los Angeles.
- January 20: Dan Levy's album version of his November 2016 special Lion is released on iTunes, Google Play, Spotify and other digital audio retailers by Comedy Dynamics.
- January 20: Jena Friedman's album version of her October 2016 special American Cunt is released on iTunes. The album was recorded at The Slipper Room in New York.
- January 24: Cristela Alonzo's one-hour special Lower Classy is released on Netflix. The special was filmed at the Empire Theatre in San Antonio.
- January 24: Gad Elmaleh's one-hour special Gad Gone Wild is released on Netflix. The special was filmed at the L'Olympia in Montreal and performed mainly in French.
- January 26: Adam Newman's one-hour special Fuzzies is released on Seeso. The special was filmed at the Georgia Theatre in Athens, Georgia.
- January 27: Aries Spears' album version of his November 2016 special Comedy Blueprint is released on iTunes, Google Play, Spotify and other digital audio retailers by Comedy Dynamics. The special was filmed in Philadelphia, Pennsylvania.
- January 31: Bill Burr's one-hour special Walk Your Way Out is released on Netflix. The special was filmed at the Ryman Auditorium in Nashville, Tennessee.

=== February ===
- February 3: Joe DeRosa's one-hour special You Let Me Down is released on Comedy Central. The special was filmed at The Masonic Lodge at Hollywood Forever Cemetery in Los Angeles.
- February 3: Katie Goodman's album Halfway Closer to Dead is released on iTunes, Google Play, Spotify and other digital audio retailers by Comedy Dynamics.
- February 10: Nick Cannon's one-hour special Stand Up Don't Shoot! is released on Showtime. The special was filmed at the Ebony Repertory Theatre in Los Angeles.
- February 10: Joey Coco Diaz's album version of his December 2016 special Sociably Unacceptable is released on iTunes, Google Play, Spotify and other digital audio retailers by Comedy Dynamics.
- February 14: Katherine Ryan's one-hour special In Trouble is released on Netflix. The special was filmed at the Hammersmith Apollo in London.
- February 16: Nick Di Paolo's one-hour special Inflammatory is released on Seeso. The special was filmed at the Suffolk Theater in Riverhead, New York.
- February 16: Gina Yashere's one-hour special Ticking Boxes is released on Seeso. The special was filmed at the O2 Brixton Academy in London.
- February 17: Andy Kindler's album State of the Industry is released on iTunes, Google Play, Spotify and other digital audio retailers by Comedy Dynamics.
- February 17: Johnny Taylor's album Trump. Sugar. Sux. Tragic. is released on Stand Up! Records.
- February 19: Roy Wood Jr.'s one-hour special Father Figure is released on Comedy Central. The special was filmed at the Center Stage Theater in Atlanta.
- February 21: Trevor Noah's one-hour special Afraid of the Dark is released on Netflix. The special was filmed at the Beacon Theatre in New York.
- February 24: Nick Thune's album version of his December 2016 special Good Guy is released on iTunes. The album was recorded in Portland, Oregon.
- February 28: Mike Birbiglia's one-hour special Thank God for Jokes is released on Netflix. The special was filmed at the BAM Harvey Theater in New York.

=== March ===
- March 2: Jackie Kashian's album I Am Not The Hero of This Story is released on Stand Up! Records.
- March 3: Kurt Braunohler's one-hour special Trust Me is released on Comedy Central. The special was filmed at the Revolution Hall in Portland, Oregon.
- March 3: Ian Harvie's album version of his December 2016 special May the Best Cock Win is released on iTunes, Google Play, Spotify and other digital audio retailers by Comedy Dynamics.
- March 3: Diane Spencer's one-hour special Seamless is released on YouTube. The special was filmed at The Ent Shed in Bedford.
- March 7: Amy Schumer's one-hour special The Leather Special is released on Netflix. The special was filmed at the Bellco Theatre in Denver.
- March 9: Fahim Anwar's one-hour special There's No Business Like Show Business is released on Seeso. The special was filmed at the Alex Theatre in Glendale, California.
- March 10: Brian Posehn's album version of his January 2017 special Posehn 25x2 is released on iTunes, Amazon and Google Play by Comedy Dynamics.
- March 10: Jenny Zigrino's album JZ’S New Album is released on Stand Up! Records.
- March 11: Jerrod Carmichael's one-hour special 8 is released on HBO. The special was filmed at the Masonic Hall in New York.
- March 14: Jim Norton's one-hour special Mouthful of Shame is released on Netflix. The special was filmed at the Skirball Center in New York.
- March 17: Mike Finola's album Live in Burlington is released on iTunes, Spotify and other digital audio retailers by Comedy Dynamics.
- March 18: K. Trevor Wilson's half-hour special Bigger in Person is released on The Comedy Network. The special was filmed at the L’Astral in Montreal.
- March 21: Dave Chappelle's one-hour special Deep in the Heart of Texas is released on Netflix. The special was filmed at the Moody Theater in Austin, Texas.
- March 21: Dave Chappelle's one-hour special The Age of Spin is released on Netflix. The special was filmed at the Hollywood Palladium in Los Angeles.
- March 24: Wil Anderson's one-hour special Fire at Wil is released on Stan. The special was filmed at the Comedy Theatre in Melbourne.
- March 27: Tom Walker's one-hour special Jonathan Pie: LIVE! is released on JonathanPie.com. The special was filmed at the Shepherd's Bush Empire in London.
- March 28: Jo Koy's one-hour special Live from Seattle is released on Netflix. The special was filmed at the Moore Theatre in Seattle.
- March 29: Adam Rowe's one-hour special I Know What You're Saying is released on Gumroad. The special was filmed at the Hot Water Comedy Club in Liverpool.
- March 30: Sasheer Zamata's one-hour special Pizza Mind is released on Seeso. The special was filmed at the Civic Theatre in New Orleans.
- March 31: Celia Pacquola's one-hour special The Looking Glass is released on Stan. The special was filmed at the Comedy Theatre in Melbourne.
- March 31: Adam Newman's album version of his January 2017 special Fuzzies is released on iTunes, Google Play, Spotify and other digital audio retailers by Comedy Dynamics. The album was recorded at the Georgia Theatre in Athens, GA.

=== April ===
- April 4: Louis C.K.'s one-hour special Louis C.K. 2017 is released on Netflix. The special was filmed at the DAR Constitution Hall in Washington.
- April 7: Tom Ballard's one-hour special The World Keeps Happening is released on Stan. The special was filmed at the Comedy Theatre in Melbourne.
- April 7: Steve Byrne's one-hour special Tell the Damn Joke is released on Showtime. The special was filmed at the Lincoln Hall in Chicago.
- April 14: Sam Simmons's one-hour special Stop Being Silly is released on Stan. The special was filmed at the Comedy Theatre in Melbourne.
- April 14: Bill Hicks' album version of his 1992 special Relentless is released on iTunes, Google Play, Spotify and other digital audio retailers by Comedy Dynamics.
- April 18: The Lucas Brothers' one-hour special On Drugs is released on Netflix. The special was filmed at The Bell House in New York.
- April 18: Dan Cummins's one-hour special Don’t Wake the Bear is released on Google Play, iTunes, Steam and Vudu. The special was filmed at The Depot in Salt Lake.
- April 20: Brent Weinbach's one-hour special Appealing to the Mainstream is released on Seeso. The special was filmed at the Colony Theatre in Burbank, California.
- April 21: Nick DiPaolo's album version of his February 2018 special Inflammatory is released on iTunes, Google Play, Spotify and other digital audio retailers by Comedy Dynamics.
- April 21: Judith Lucy's one-hour special Ask No Questions of the Moth is released on Stan. The special was filmed at the Comedy Theatre in Melbourne.
- April 25: Vir Das's one-hour special Abroad Understanding is released on Netflix. The special was filmed in two crosscut performances; the first part was filmed at the Indira Gandhi Stadium in New Delhi, and the second part was filmed in New York.
- April 28: Tom Gleeson's one-hour special Great is released on Stan. The special was filmed at the Comedy Theatre in Melbourne.
- April 28: Tom Segura's album version of his January 2016 special Mostly Stories is released on iTunes, Google Play, Spotify and other digital audio retailers by Comedy Dynamics.

=== May ===
- May 2: Maria Bamford's one-hour special Old Baby is released on Netflix. The special is cut together from performances in various settings, including living rooms, bookstores, alleyways, clubs and The Novo in Los Angeles.
- May 5: Al Madrigal's one-hour special Shrimpin' Ain't Easy is released on Showtime. The special was filmed at The Masonic Lodge at HFC in Los Angeles.
- May 5: Natalia Valdebenito's album version of her 2017 special Gritona is released on iTunes, Google Play, Spotify and other digital audio retailers by Comedy Dynamics. The special was filmed in Santiago, Chile.
- May 6: Chris Gethard's one-hour special Career Suicide is released on HBO. The special was filmed at the Lynn Redgrave Theater in New York.
- May 9: Norm Macdonald's one-hour special Hitler's Dog, Gossip & Trickery is released on Netflix. The special was filmed at the Wilbur Theatre in Boston.
- May 12: Mark Normand's one-hour special Don’t Be Yourself is released on Comedy Central. The special was filmed at the Angel Orensanz Center in New York.
- May 12: Steve Gillespie's album Alive on State is released on Stand Up! Records.
- May 12: Ali Wong's album version of her May 2016 special Baby Cobra is released on iTunes, Google Play, Spotify and other digital audio retailers by Comedy Dynamics.
- May 16: Tracy Morgan's one-hour special Staying Alive is released on Netflix. The special was filmed at the Count Basie Theatre in Red Bank, New Jersey.
- May 19: Fahim Anwar's album version of his March 2017 special, There's No Business Like Show Business, is released on iTunes, Apple Music, Google Play, Spotify and other digital audio retailers by Comedy Dynamics.
- May 19: Nick Offerman and Megan Mullally's one-hour special Summer of 69: No Apostrophe is released on Epix. The special was filmed at the Barclay Theatre in Irvine, California.
- May 19: Daniel Muggleton's album Let Me Finish is released on iTunes, Google Play, Spotify and other digital audio retailers by Comedy Dynamics.
- May 23: Hasan Minhaj's one-hour special Homecoming King is released on Netflix. The special was filmed at the Mondavi Center in Davis, California.
- May 26: Clayton English's album All the Same is released on iTunes, Google Play, Spotify and other digital audio retailers by Comedy Dynamics.
- May 30: Sarah Silverman's one-hour special A Speck of Dust is released on Netflix. The special was filmed at the Largo at the Coronet in Los Angeles.

=== June ===
- June 2: Andrew Santino's one-hour special Home Field Advantage is released on Showtime. The special was filmed at The Vic Theatre in Chicago.
- June 2: Sasheer Zamata's album version of her March 2017 special, Pizza Mind, is released on iTunes, Apple Music, Sirius XM, Spotify and other digital audio retailers by Comedy Dynamics.
- June 9: Jeff Simmermon's album And I Am Not Lying is released on iTunes, Google Play, Spotify and other digital audio retailers by Comedy Dynamics.
- June 13: Jim Gaffigan's album version of his January 2017 special Cinco is released on iTunes, Google Play, Spotify and other digital audio retailers by Comedy Dynamics.
- June 17: T.J. Miller's one-hour special Meticulously Ridiculous is released on HBO. The special was filmed at the Paramount Theatre in Denver.
- June 19: Sid Singh's album Amazing (Probably) is released on Stand Up! Records.
- June 20: Rory Scovel's one-hour special Rory Scovel Tries Stand-Up for the First Time is released on Netflix. The special was filmed at the Relapse Theatre in Atlanta.
- June 21: Robert Baril's album Sex & Politics is released on Stand Up! Records.
- June 22: Doug Stanhope's one-hour special Comedians', Comedian's, Comedians is released on Seeso. The special was filmed in Austin, TX.
- June 23: Brent Weinbach's album version of his special Appealing to the Mainstream is released on iTunes, Google Play, Spotify and other digital audio retailers by Comedy Dynamics.
- June 23: Andrew Santino's album version of his special Homefield Advantage is released on iTunes, Google Play, Spotify and other digital audio retailers by Comedy Dynamics.
- June 27: Chris D'Elia's one-hour special Man on Fire is released on Netflix. The special was filmed at the Vogue Theatre in Vancouver.
- June 30: David Dyer's album Uncooked is released on iTunes, Google Play, Spotify and other digital audio retailers by Comedy Dynamics.

=== July ===
- July 7: Erik Griffin's one-hour special The Ugly Truth is released on Showtime. The special was filmed at the Laugh Factory in Long Beach, California.
- July 7: Pete Holmes's album Faces & Sounds is released on iTunes, Google Play, Spotify and other digital audio retailers by Comedy Dynamics.
- July 10: Derek Sheen's album Holy Drivel is released on Stand Up! Records.
- July 14: Jeremy Arroyo's album Groaners is released on iTunes, Google Play, Spotify and other digital audio retailers by Comedy Dynamics.
- July 18: Ari Shaffir's double one-hour special Double Negative is released on Netflix. The special was filmed at the Cap City Comedy Club in Austin, Texas and consists of two parts: Double Negative: Children and Double Negative: Adulthood.
- July 21: Freddie Farrell's album Excuse Me While I Burst Into Flames is released on iTunes, Google Play, Spotify and other digital audio retailers by Comedy Dynamics.
- July 25: Joe Mande's one-hour special Joe Mande’s Award-Winning Comedy Special is released on Netflix. The special was filmed at the Highline Ballroom in New York.
- July 28: Nick Cannon's album version of his special Stand-Up, Don't Shoot is released on iTunes, Google Play, Spotify and other digital audio retailers by Comedy Dynamics.

=== August ===
- August 1: Maz Jobrani's one-hour special Immigrant is released on Netflix. The special was filmed at the Kennedy Center in Washington.
- August 4: Scott Gibson's album Life After Death is released on iTunes, Google Play, Spotify and other digital audio retailers by Comedy Dynamics.
- August 4: Danny Lobell's album The Nicest Boy in Barcelona is released on Stand Up! Records.
- August 5: George Lopez's one-hour special The Wall is released on HBO. The special was filmed at the Kennedy Center in Washington.
- August 11: Fern Brady's album Male Comedienne is released on iTunes, Google Play, Spotify and other digital audio retailers by Comedy Dynamics.
- August 15: Brad Paisley's special Brad Paisley's Comedy Rodeo is released on Netflix. The special was filmed in Nashville, TN.
- August 18: Tiffany Haddish's one-hour special She Ready! From the Hood to Hollywood! is released on Showtime. The special was filmed at the Nate Holden Performing Arts Center in Los Angeles.
- August 22: Lynne Koplitz's one-hour special Hormonal Beast is released on Netflix. The special was filmed at The Kaye Playhouse in New York.
- August 25: Tiffany Haddish's album version of her special She Ready! From the Hood to Hollywood! is released on iTunes, Google Play, Spotify and other digital audio retailers by Comedy Dynamics.
- August 29: Ryan Hamilton's one-hour special Happy Face is released on Netflix. The special was filmed at The Kaye Playhouse in New York.

=== September ===
- September 1: Doug Stanhope's album version of his special Comedians', Comedian's, Comedians is released on iTunes, Google Play, Spotify and other digital audio retailers by Comedy Dynamics. The album was recorded in Austin, TX.
- September 5: Marc Maron's one-hour special Too Real is released on Netflix. The special was filmed at the Pantages Theatre in Minneapolis.
- September 8: Ray Harrington's album Overwhelmed is released on Stand Up! Records.
- September 8: David Liebe Hart's album Space Ranger is released on iTunes, Google Play, Spotify and other digital audio retailers by Comedy Dynamics.
- September 12: Jeff Dunham's one-hour special Relative Disaster is released on Netflix. The special was filmed at the Bord Gáis Energy Theatre in Dublin.
- September 15: Ify Nwadiwe's album The Community College Dropout is released on iTunes, Google Play, Spotify and other digital audio retailers by Comedy Dynamics.
- September 19: Jerry Seinfeld's one-hour special Jerry Before Seinfeld is released on Netflix. The special was filmed at the Comic Strip in New York.
- September 19: Ophira Eisenberg's one-hour special Inside Joke is released on Comedy Dynamics Network.
- September 22: Barry Crimmins's album version of his July 2016 special Whatever Threatens You is released on iTunes, Google Play, Spotify and other digital audio retailers by Comedy Dynamics. The album was recorded in Lawrence, KS.
- September 22: Jason Dudey's album Exceeding All Expectations is released on Stand Up! Records.
- September 22: April Macie's album No Shame is released on iTunes, Google Play, Spotify and other digital audio retailers by Comedy Dynamics.
- September 29: Anjelah Johnson's one-hour special Mahalo & Goodnight is released on Epix. The special was filmed at the Hawaii Theatre in Honolulu.
- September 29: Jeff Foxworthy & Larry the Cable Guys' album version of their August 2016 special We've Been Thinking is released on iTunes, Google Play, Spotify and other digital audio retailers by Comedy Dynamics.
- September 29: Chris Porter's album Lost & Alone is released on Stand Up! Records.
- September 30: Felipe Esparza's one-hour special Translate This is released on HBO. The special was filmed at the San Jose Improv in San Jose.

=== October ===
- October 3: Rodney Carrington's one-hour special Here Comes the Truth is released on Netflix. The special was filmed at the BOK Center in Tulsa.
- October 3: Bryan Callen's one-hour special Never Grow Up is released on Comedy Dynamics Network.
- October 6: Matt Goldich's album The Matt Goldich Guarantee is released on iTunes, Google Play, Spotify and other digital audio retailers by Comedy Dynamics.
- October 10: Christina Pazsitzky's one-hour special Mother Inferior is released on Netflix. The special was filmed at The Showbox in Seattle.
- October 13: Derek Sheen's album Disasterbation is released on Stand Up! Records.
- October 13: Sean Sullivan's album Song & Dance Man is released on iTunes, Google Play, Spotify and other digital audio retailers by Comedy Dynamics.
- October 17: Patton Oswalt's one-hour special Annihilation is released on Netflix. The special was filmed at the Athenaeum Theatre in Chicago.
- October 20: Jason Collings's album School Shoes is released on iTunes, Google Play, Spotify and other digital audio retailers by Comedy Dynamics.
- October 24: Jack Whitehall's one-hour special At Large is released on Netflix. The special was filmed at the Hammersmith Apollo in London.
- October 27: Anjelah Johnson's album version of her special Mahalo & Goodnight is released on iTunes, Google Play, Spotify and other digital audio retailers by Comedy Dynamics.
- October 31: Judah Friedlander's one-hour special America Is the Greatest Country in the United States is released on Netflix. The special was filmed at The Comedy Cellar in New York.

=== November ===
- November 2: Lavell Crawford's one-hour special Home for the Holidays is released on Showtime. The special was filmed at The Pageant in St. Louis, MO.
- November 3: Kenny DeForest's album B.A.D. Dreams is released on iTunes, Google Play, Spotify and other digital audio retailers by Comedy Dynamics.
- November 10: Ricardo Quevedo's album Los Resentidos Somos Mas is released on iTunes, Google Play, Spotify and other digital audio retailers by Comedy Dynamics.
- November 10: Natalia Valdebenito's one-hour special Gritona is released on Netflix. The special was filmed at the Teatro Caupolicán in Santiago, Chile.
- November 14: DeRay Davis's one-hour special How to Act Black is released on Netflix. The special was filmed at the Variety Playhouse in Atlanta.
- November 14: Bob Saget's one-hour special Zero to Sixty is released on iTunes, Amazon and other digital platforms. The special was filmed at the Music Hall of Williamsburg in New York.
- November 14: Bob Saget's album version of his special Zero to Sixty is released on iTunes, Google Play, Spotify and other digital audio retailers by Comedy Dynamics.
- November 21: Brian Regan's one-hour special Nunchucks and Flamethrowers is released on Netflix. The special was filmed at the Paramount Theatre in Denver.
- November 24: Glenn Wool's album This Road Has Tolls is released on Stand Up! Records.

=== December ===
- December 1: Adam Mamawala's album One of the Good Ones is released on iTunes, Google Play, Spotify and other digital audio retailers by Comedy Dynamics.
- December 2: Michelle Wolf's one-hour special Nice Lady is released on HBO. The special was filmed at the Skirball Center in New York.
- December 5: Craig Ferguson's one-hour special Tickle Fight is released on Netflix. The special was filmed at the Ludger-Duvernay Theatre in Montreal.
- December 8: Lavell Crawford's album version of his special Home for the Holidays is released on iTunes, Google Play, Spotify and other digital audio retailers by Comedy Dynamics.
- December 12: Judd Apatow's one-hour special The Return is released on Netflix. The special was filmed at the Cinquieme Salle in Montreal.
- December 15: Nick Hoff's album Baby Daddy is released on iTunes, Google Play, Spotify and other digital audio retailers by Comedy Dynamics.
- December 15: Ian Harris's album version of his special ExtraOrdinary is released on iTunes, Google Play, Spotify and other digital audio retailers by Comedy Dynamics.
- December 19: Russell Howard's one-hour special Recalibrate is released on Netflix. The special was filmed at the Brighton Dome in Brighton.
- December 20: Kurtis Conner's 45-minute special Hot Jokes: A Comedy Special is released on his website, kurtisconner.com. The special was filmed in Ontario, Canada.
- December 22: Bill Hicks's album version of his 1993 special Revelations is released on iTunes, Google Play, Spotify and other digital audio retailers by Comedy Dynamics.
- December 26: Todd Barry's one-hour special Spicy Honey is released on Netflix. The special was filmed at the Music Hall of Williamsburg in New York.
- December 26: Taylor Williamson's one-hour special Please Like Me is released on Comedy Dynamics Network. The special was filmed in Denver, CO.
- December 26: Taylor Williamson's album version of his special Please Like Me is released on iTunes, Google Play, Spotify and other digital audio retailers by Comedy Dynamics.
- December 31: Dave Chappelle's two one-hour specials Equanimity and The Bird Revelation were released on Netflix. The specials were filmed at the Warner Theatre in Washington and Los Angeles respectively.

== See also ==
- List of stand-up comedians
