= 2015 in stand-up comedy =

Years in stand-up comedy
- 2015 2016 2017 2018 2019 2020 2021 2022

This is a timeline documenting events and facts about stand-up comedy in the year 2015.

== Events ==
- February 13, 2015: Solomon Georgio does his first late night set on TBS's Late Night with Conan O'Brien.
- February 24: Comedy Dynamics announces that they have acquired late comedian's Bill Hicks’ estate and will be re-releasing his entire catalog of specials and albums.
- May 3: a larger-than-life sized statue of Richard Pryor is unveiled in the late comedian's hometown, Peoria. The statue was created by artist Preston Jackson, who named it Richard Pryor: More than Just a Comedian.
- May 19: Chelsea Peretti wins the Webby Award for Outstanding Comedic Performance for her Netflix special, One of the Greats.
- September 20: Louis C.K. wins the Primetime Emmy Award for Outstanding Writing for a Variety Special for his self-distributed special, Live at the Comedy Store.

== Deaths ==
- February 19: Harris Wittels dies at the age of 30 in Los Angeles, from an accidental heroin overdose.

== Releases ==
=== January ===
- January 2: Nick DiPaolo's one-hour special Another Senseless Killing is released on VHX. The special was filmed at the Acme Comedy Club in Minneapolis.
- January 16: Gary Owen's one-hour special I Agree with Myself is released on Showtime. The special was filmed at the Atlanta Civic Center in Atlanta.
- January 16: Corey Adam's album No Joke is released on Stand Up! Records.
- January 16: Ari Shaffir's one-hour special Paid Regular is released on Comedy Central. The special was filmed at The Comedy Store in Los Angeles.
- January 23: Kyle Kinane's one-hour special I Liked His Old Stuff Better is released on Comedy Central. The special was filmed at the 40 Watt Club in Athens.
- January 23: Iliza Shlesinger's one-hour special Freezing Hot is released on Netflix. The special was filmed at the Gothic Theatre in Englewood.
- January 25: Adam Newman's album Killed is released on Stand Up! Records.
- January 27: Louis C.K.'s one-hour special Live at the Comedy Store is released on LouisCK.net. The special was filmed at The Comedy Store in Los Angeles.
- January 31: Mel Brooks's one-hour special Live at the Geffen is released on HBO. The special was filmed at the Geffen Playhouse in Los Angeles.

=== February ===
- February 5: Brian Gaar's one-hour special Jokes I Wrote at Work is released on Vimeo. The special was filmed at the Spider House in Austin.
- February 6: Matt Braunger's one-hour special Big Dumb Animal is released on Comedy Central. The special was filmed at The Bell House in New York.
- February 15: Andy Peters's one-hour special Exclamation Mark Question Point is released on Hulu. The special was filmed at The Virgil in Los Angeles.
- February 21: Keith Robinson's one-hour special Back of the Bus Funny is released on Comedy Central. The special was filmed at the Gramercy Theatre in New York.
- February 28: Ralphie May's one-hour special Unruly is released on Netflix. The special was filmed at the Cobb Energy Performing Arts Centre in Atlanta.

=== March ===
- March 6: Aziz Ansari's one-hour special Live at Madison Square Garden is released on Netflix. The special was filmed at the Madison Square Garden in New York.
- March 6: Trevor Moore's one-hour special High in Church is released on Comedy Central. The special was filmed at the Gramercy Theatre in New York.
- March 14: Jay Mohr's one-hour special Happy. And a Lot. is released on Showtime. The special was filmed at the Lobero Theatre in Santa Barbara.

=== April ===
- April 17: Chris D'Elia's one-hour special Incorrigible is released on Netflix. The special was filmed at The Wiltern in Los Angeles.
- April 17: Tig Notaro's stand-up tour documentary Knock Knock, It's Tig Notaro is released on Showtime. The documentary was filmed across the country and Tig's hometown of Pass Christian, Mississippi.
- April 17: Barry Hilton's one-hour special The Live Series: Barry Hilton is released on M-Net. The special was filmed at the Lyric Theatre in Johannesburg.
- April 18: Joan Rivers's album The Next To Last Joan Rivers Album is released on Stand Up! Records.
- April 24: Jim Norton's one-hour special Contextually Inadequate is released on Epix. The special was filmed at the Somerville Theatre in Boston.
- April 27: Nate Bargatze's one-hour special Full Time Magic is released on Comedy Central. The special was filmed at the Gramercy Theatre in New York.
- April 29: Mick Foley's one-hour special Cheap Pops is released on WWE Network. The special was filmed at the Full Sail University in Winter Park.

=== May ===
- May 5: David Heti's album It Was OK, An Album of Comedy by David Heti is released on Stand Up! Records.
- May 8: Brad Williams's one-hour special Fun Size is released on Showtime. The special was filmed at the Lobero Theatre in Santa Barbara.
- May 9: Christopher Titus's one-hour special The Angry Pursuit of Happiness is released on Comedy Central. The special was filmed at the Lobero Theatre in Santa Barbara.
- May 22: Jen Kirkman's one-hour special I'm Gonna Die Alone (And I Feel Fine) is released on Netflix. The special was filmed at The North Door in Austin.
- May 29: Jim Breuer's one-hour special Comic Frenzy is released on Epix. The special was filmed at the Paramount Theatre in New York.
- May 30: Nick Swardson's one-hour special Taste It is released on Comedy Central. The special was filmed at The Paramount Theatre in Austin.

=== June ===
- June 17: Susan Calman's one-hour special Lady Like is released on Go Faster Stripe. The special was filmed at the Citizens Theatre in Glasgow.
- June 26: Lisa Lampanelli's one-hour special Back to the Drawing Board is released on Epix. The special was filmed at the Tarrytown Music Hall in Greenburgh.

=== July ===
- July 10: Chris Tucker's one-hour special Chris Tucker Live is released on Netflix. The special was filmed at the Fox Theatre in Atlanta.
- July 11: Bridget Everett's one-hour special Gynecological Wonder is released on Comedy Central. The special was filmed at the Joe's Pub in New York.
- July 15: Eugene Mirman's one-hour special Vegan on His Way to the Complain Store is released on Netflix. The special was filmed at the Old Tucson Studios in Tucson.

=== August ===
- August 1: Jay Pharoah's one-hour special Can I Be Me? is released on Showtime. The special was filmed at The Cutting Room in New York.
- August 14: Demetri Martin's one-hour special Live (At the Time) is released on Netflix. The special was filmed at the Lincoln Theatre in Washington.
- August 15: Colin Quinn's one-hour special Unconstitutional is released on Netflix. The special was filmed at the Cherry Lane Theatre in New York.
- August 21: Maz Jobrani's one-hour special I'm Not a Terrorist, But I've Played One on TV is released on Showtime. The special was filmed at The Wiltern in Los Angeles.
- August 22: Natasha Leggero's one-hour special Live at Bimbo's is released on Comedy Central. The special was filmed at the Bimbo's 365 Club in San Francisco.
- August 22: Tig Notaro's one-hour special Boyish Girl Interrupted is released on HBO. The special was filmed at the Wilbur Theatre in Boston.
- August 28: Doug Mellard's album Fart Safari is released on Stand Up! Records.

=== September ===
- September 5: Lil Rel Howery's one-hour special RELevent [sic] is released on Comedy Central. The special was filmed at The Vic Theatre in Chicago.
- September 10: Craig Ferguson's one-hour special Just Being Honest is released on Epix. The special was filmed ae The Town Hall in New York.
- September 17: Jeff Dunham's one-hour special Unhinged in Hollywood is released on NBC. The special was filmed at the Hollywood and Highland Center in Los Angeles.
- September 19: Steve Rannazzisi's one-hour special Breaking Dad is released on Comedy Central. The special was filmed at the Wilbur Theatre in Boston.
- September 25: Margaret Cho's one-hour special PsyCHO is released on Showtime. The special was filmed at the Gramercy Theatre in New York.
- September 25: David Huntsberger's album One-Headed Beast is released on Stand Up! Records.
- September 26: Brian Regan's one-hour special Live from Radio City Music Hall is released on Comedy Central. The special was filmed at the Radio City Music Hall in New York.

=== October ===
- October 1: Anjelah Johnson's one-hour special Not Fancy is released on Netflix. The special was filmed at the City National Grove of Anaheim in Anaheim.
- October 2: Maggie Faris's album Hot Lesbo Action is released on Stand Up! Records.
- October 6: Jimmy Dore's one-hour special Sentenced to Live is released on Hulu. The special was filmed at the El Portal Theater in Los Angeles.
- October 9: Mary Mack's album Pig Woman is released on Stand Up! Records.
- October 10: Paul F. Tompkins's one-hour special Crying and Driving is released on Comedy Central. The special was filmed at the Palace Theatre in Los Angeles.
- October 16: Anthony Jeselnik's one-hour special Thoughts and Prayers is released on Netflix. The special was filmed at The Fillmore in San Francisco.
- October 17: Amy Schumer's one-hour special Live at the Apollo is released on HBO. The special was filmed at the Apollo Theater in New York.
- October 23: Mikey Manker's album Voyageur is released on Stand Up! Records.
- October 27: Sarah Colonna's one-hour special I Can't Feel My Legs is released on Hulu. The special was filmed at the El Portal Theater in Los Angeles.

=== November ===
- November 13: Bianca Del Rio's one-hour special Rolodex of Hate is released on Vimeo. The special was filmed at The Paramount Theatre in Austin.
- November 13: Miles Jupp's one-hour special Miles Jupp Is the Chap You're Thinking Of is released on Go Faster Stripe. The special was filmed at the Theatre Royal in Margate.
- November 13: John Mulaney's one-hour special The Comeback Kid is released on Netflix. The special was filmed at the Chicago Theatre in Chicago.
- November 15: John Bishop's one-hour special John Bishop Supersonic Live is released on BBC Worldwide. The special was filmed at the Royal Albert Hall in London.
- November 22: Trevor Noah's one-hour special Lost in Translation is released on Comedy Central. The special was filmed at the Lincoln Theatre in Washington.
- November 23: Dara Ó Briain's one-hour special Crowd Tickler is released by Universal Studios. The special was filmed at the Hammersmith Apollo in London.
- November 23: Kevin Bridges's one-hour special A Whole Different Story... is released by Universal Studios. The special was filmed at The SSE Hydro in Glasgow.
- November 27: Jim David's album Hard to Swallow is released on Stand Up! Records.

=== December ===
- December 1: Brent Morin's one-hour special I'm Brent Morin is released on Netflix. The special was filmed at the Gramercy Theatre in New York.
- December 4: Marc Maron's one-hour special More Later is released on Epix. The special was filmed at The Vic Theatre in Chicago.
- December 4: Ryan Singer's album Immortal for Now is released on Stand Up! Records.
- December 10: Elliott Morgan's one-hour special Premature is released on Vimeo. The special was filmed at the El Cid in Los Angeles.
- December 11: Jermaine Fowler's one-hour special Give'em Hell Kid is released on Showtime. The special was filmed at the DC Improv in Washington.
- December 14: Colleen Ballinger's one-hour special Miranda Sings: Selp Helf is released on Vimeo. The special was filmed at The Moore Theatre in Seattle.
- December 18: Mike Epps's one-hour special Don't Take It Personal is released on Netflix. The special was filmed at the Orpheum Theatre in Los Angeles.

== See also ==
- List of stand-up comedians
