= 2016 in stand-up comedy =

Years in stand-up comedy
- 2015 2016 2017 2018 2019 2020 2021 2022

This is a timeline documenting events and facts about stand-up comedy in the year 2016.

== Events ==
- January 7: NBCUniversal launches its comedy streaming subscription service, Seeso.
- May 10: George Carlin's daughter, Kelly Carlin, announces the donation of her late father's archives to the forthcoming National Comedy Center's museum, set to open in 2017.
- July 20: Mike Ward is ordered by Quebec’s Human Rights Tribunal to pay $35,000 to Jérémy Gabriel, a French Canadian singer with Treacher Collins syndrome, and $7,000 to Jérémy's mother, for jokes he performed in regards to Jérémy's handicap and singing in his shows from 2010 to 2013.
- September 18: Patton Oswalt wins the Primetime Emmy Award for Outstanding Writing for a Variety Special for his Netflix special, Talking for Clapping.

== Deaths ==
- March 24: Garry Shandling dies at the age of 66 in Los Angeles, suffering from hyperparathyroidism.
- April 20: Victoria Wood dies at the age of 62 in London, suffering from terminal cancer.
- October 21: Kevin Meaney dies at the age of 60 in Forestburgh.
- December 26: Ricky Harris dies of a heart attack at the age of 54.

== Releases ==
=== January ===
- January 7: Matt Besser's one-hour special Besser Breaks the Record is released on Seeso. The special was filmed at the UCB Theatre in Los Angeles.
- January 7: Rory Scovel's one-hour special The Charleston Special is released on Seeso. The special was filmed at the Woolfe Street Playhouse in Charleston.
- January 8: Tom Segura's one-hour special Mostly Stories is released on Netflix. The special was filmed at the Neptune Theatre in Seattle.
- January 15: Tony Hinchcliffe's one-hour special One Shot is released on Netflix. The special was filmed at The Ice House in Pasadena.
- January 23: Whitney Cummings's one-hour special I'm Your Girlfriend is released on HBO. The special was filmed at The Broad Stage in Santa Monica.

=== February ===
- February 1: Brett Erickson's one-hour special Brett Erickson Wants You to Stop Calling Him a Prophet is released on Vimeo. The special was filmed at the Skyline Comedy Cafe in Appleton.
- February 5: Hannibal Buress's one-hour special Comedy Camisado is released on Netflix. The special was filmed at the Varsity Theater in Minneapolis.
- February 19: Alonzo Bodden's one-hour special Historically Incorrect is released on Showtime. The special was filmed at The Vic Theatre in Chicago.
- February 26: Theo Von's one-hour special No Offense is released on Netflix. The special was filmed at the Civic Theatre.

=== March ===
- March 18: Jimmy Carr's one-hour special Funny Business is released on Netflix. The special was filmed at the Hammersmith Apollo in London.
- March 18: Steve-O's one-hour special Guilty as Charged is released on Showtime. The special was filmed at The Paramount Theatre in Austin.
- March 21: Stephen Lynch's one-hour special Hello, Kalamazoo! is released on Vimeo. The special was filmed at The Little Theatre in Kalamazoo.
- March 24: Cameron Esposito's one-hour special Marriage Material is released on Seeso. The special was filmed at the Thalia Hall in Chicago.

=== April ===
- April 1: Frankie Boyle's one-hour special Hurt Like You've Never Been Loved is released on Netflix. The special was filmed at the Citizens Theatre in Glasgow.
- April 4: Patrick Susmilch's album Validate Me is released on Stand Up! Records.
- April 9: Nikki Glaser's one-hour special Perfect is released on Comedy Central. The special was filmed at the Gerald W. Lynch Theater in New York.
- April 13: Garfunkel and Oates's one-hour special Trying to Be Special is released on Vimeo. The special was filmed at the Neptune Theater in Seattle.
- April 17: Daniel Tosh's one-hour special People Pleaser is released on Comedy Central. The special was filmed at the Wilshire Ebell Theater in Los Angeles.
- April 22: Sean Hughes's one-hour special Mumbo Jumbo is released on Go Faster Stripe. The special was filmed at the Chapter Arts Centre in Cardiff.
- April 22: Patton Oswalt's one-hour special Talking for Clapping is released on Netflix. The special was filmed at The Fillmore in San Francisco.
- April 23: Rachel Feinstein's one-hour special Only Whores Wear Purple is released on Comedy Central. The special was filmed at the Gerald W. Lynch Theater in New York.
- April 29: W. Kamau Bell's one-hour special Semi-Prominent Negro is released on Showtime. The special was filmed at the Roulette Intermedium in New York.
- April 30: Chris Hardwick's one-hour special Funcomfortable is released on Comedy Central. The special was filmed at the Palace of Fine Arts in San Francisco.

=== May ===
- May 1: Gary Gulman's one-hour special It's About Time is released on Netflix. The special was filmed at the Highline Ballroom in New York.
- May 6: Ali Wong's one-hour special Baby Cobra is released on Netflix. The special was filmed at the Neptune Theater in Seattle.
- May 13: Michael Ian Black's one-hour special Noted Expert is released on Epix. The special was filmed at the John Jay College in New York.
- May 18: Derek Sheen's album Tiny Idiot is released on Stand Up! Records.
- May 20: Brad Williams's one-hour special Daddy Issues is released on Showtime. The special was filmed at the Alex Theatre in Glendale.
- May 21: Dan Soder's one-hour special Not Special is released on Comedy Central. The special was filmed at the Trocadero Theatre in Philadelphia.

=== June ===
- June 2: Quincy Jones's one-hour special Burning the Light is released on HBO. The special was filmed at The Teragram Ballroom in Los Angeles.
- June 3: Bo Burnham's one-hour special Make Happy is released on Netflix. The special was filmed at the Capitol Theatre in Port Chester.
- June 3: Ben Gleib's one-hour special Neurotic Gangster is released on Showtime. The special was filmed at the Lobero Theatre in Santa Barbara.
- June 7: Darlene Westgor's album Boxed Wine is released on Stand Up! Records.
- June 17: Big Jay Oakerson's one-hour special Live at Webster Hall is released on Comedy Central. The special was filmed at the Webster Hall in New York.
- June 25: Deon Cole's one-hour special Cole Blooded Seminar is released on Comedy Central. The special was filmed at the Lincoln Theatre in Washington.
- June 28: Simon Munnery's one-hour special ...And Nothing But is released on Go Faster Stripe. The special was filmed at the Bloomsbury Theatre in London.

=== July ===
- July 1: Willie Barcena's one-hour special The Truth Hurts is released on Netflix. The special was filmed at The Comic Strip in El Paso.
- July 1: Jim Jefferies's one-hour special Freedumb is released on Netflix. The special was filmed at the James Polk Theater in Nashville.
- July 1: Dwayne Perkins's one-hour special Take Note is released on Netflix. The special was filmed at the Japanese American National Museum in Los Angeles.
- July 4: Brendon Burns's one-hour special Selfies in the Grand Canyon is released on YouTube. The special was filmed at the Tiger Lounge in Manchester.
- July 22: Brian Posehn's one-hour special Criminally Posehn is released on Seeso. The special was filmed at the House of Blues in San Diego.
- July 26: Josh Blue's one-hour special Delete is released on Hulu. The special was filmed at the University of Denver in Denver.
- July 29: Aaron Aryanpur's album In Spite Of is released on Stand Up! Records.

=== August ===
- August 1: Luke Capasso's one-hour special Talkn' Loud & Sayn' Nothin' is released on Gumroad. The special was filmed at the Yellow Springs Art Center in Yellow Springs.
- August 5: David Cross's one-hour special Making America Great Again! is released on Netflix. The special was filmed at The Paramount Theatre in Austin.
- August 8: The Drug Budget & Robert Fones's album Feel Real Fear is released on Stand Up! Records.
- August 11: Henry Phillips's one-hour special Neither Here Nor There is released on Vimeo. The special was filmed at The Lyric Theatre in Los Angeles.
- August 12: Godfrey's one-hour special Regular Black is released on Showtime. The special was filmed at the UP Comedy Club in Chicago.
- August 25: JT Habersaat's album Misanthrope is released on Stand Up! Records.
- August 26: Jeff Foxworthy & Larry the Cable Guy's one-hour special We’ve Been Thinking... is released on Netflix. The special was filmed at the Orpheum Theatre in Minneapolis.

=== September ===
- September 9: Martin Lawrence's one-hour special Doin' Time: Uncut is released on Showtime. The special was filmed at the Orpheum Theatre in Los Angeles.
- September 15: Wil Hodgson's one-hour special Live on Bonfire Night is released on Go Faster Stripe. The special was filmed at the Bloomsbury Theatre in London.
- September 15: Doug Stanhope's one-hour special No Place Like Home is released on Seeso. The special was filmed at the Bisbee Royale in Bisbee.
- September 16: Cedric the Entertainer's one-hour special Live from the Ville is released on Netflix. The special was filmed at the Ryman Auditorium in Nashville.
- September 23: Iliza Shlesinger's one-hour special Confirmed Kills is released on Netflix. The special was filmed at The Vic Theatre in Chicago.
- September 29: Mike DeStefano's album Puppies and Heroin is released on Stand Up! Records.
- September 29: Ray Harrington's documentary Be A Man is released on Stand Up! Records.
- September 30: David Cross's album ...America....Great... is released on Cross' own label, Liberal Jew-Run Media Productions.

=== October ===
- October 1: Sebastian Maniscalco's one-hour special Why Would You Do That? is released on Showtime. The special was filmed at the Beacon Theatre in New York.
- October 7: Lewis Black's one-hour special Black to the Future is released on Comedy Central. The special was filmed at the Marquis Theatre in New York.
- October 7: Russell Peters's one-hour special Almost Famous is released on Netflix. The special was filmed at the Massey Hall in Toronto.
- October 14: Kevin Hart's one-hour special What Now? is released by Universal Studios. The special was filmed at the Lincoln Financial Field in Philadelphia.
- October 15: Kyle Kinane's one-hour special Loose in Chicago is released on Comedy Central. The special was filmed at the Metro in Chicago.
- October 20: Jena Friedman's one-hour special American Cunt is released on Seeso. The special was filmed at The Slipper Room in New York.
- October 21: Joe Rogan's one-hour special Triggered is released on Netflix. The special was filmed at The Fillmore in San Francisco.
- October 21: Wanda Sykes's one-hour special What Happened...Ms. Sykes? is released on Epix. The special was filmed at The Theatre at Ace Hotel in Los Angeles.
- October 23: Barry Crimmins's one-hour special Whatever Threatens You is released on LouisCK.net. The special was filmed at the Lawrence Arts Center in Lawrence.
- October 27: Janeane Garofalo's one-hour special If I May is released on Seeso. The special was filmed at The Independent Theatre in San Francisco.
- October 29: Pete Davidson's one-hour special SMD is released on Comedy Central. The special was filmed at the Skirball Center in New York.

=== November ===
- November 1: Christopher Titus's one-hour special Born with a Defect is released on ChristopherTitus.com. The special was filmed at the Center for the Arts in Escondido.
- November 2: Bill Maher's one-hour special Whiny Little Bitch is released on Facebook. The special was filmed at the Largo at the Coronet in Los Angeles.
- November 3: Mo Mandel's one-hour special Negative Reinforcement is released on Seeso. The special was filmed at the Gothic Theatre in Englewood.
- November 4: Dana Carvey's one-hour special Straight White Male, 60 is released on Netflix. The special was filmed at the Wilbur Theatre in Boston.
- November 7: Billy Connolly's one-hour special High Horse Tour Live is released by Universal Studios. The special was filmed at the Hammersmith Apollo in London.
- November 7: Sarah Millican's one-hour special Outsider is released by Universal Studios. The special was filmed at the Brighton Dome in Brighton.
- November 10: Kathleen Madigan's one-hour special Bothering Jesus is released on Netflix. The special was filmed at the Pabst Theater in Milwaukee.
- November 11: Bert Kreischer's one-hour special The Machine is released on Showtime. The special was filmed at The Improv in Irvine.
- November 11: J.J. Whitehead's album Fool Disclosure is released on Stand Up! Records.
- November 15: Loyiso Gola's one-hour special Live in New York is released on Vimeo. The special was filmed at the House of Yes in New York.
- November 16: Richard Herring's one-hour special Happy Now? is released on Go Faster Stripe. The special was filmed at the St David's Hall in Cardiff.
- November 17: Dan Levy's one-hour special Lion is released on Seeso. The special was filmed at the Neptune Theater in Seattle.
- November 18: Ben Bailey's one-hour special Ben Bailey Live and Uncensored is released on VHX. The special was filmed at the UP Comedy Club in Chicago.
- November 18: Colin Quinn's one-hour special The New York Story is released on Netflix. The special was filmed at the Schimmel Center in New York.
- November 24: Aries Spears's one-hour special Comedy Blueprint is released on Seeso. The special was filmed at the Trocadero Theatre in Philadelphia.
- November 25: Michael Che's one-hour special Michael Che Matters is released on Netflix. The special was filmed at the Greenpoint Terminal Warehouse in New York.
- November 28: Alan Davies's one-hour special Little Victories is released by Spirit Entertainment. The special was filmed at the Opera House in Wellington.
- November 28: Stewart Francis's one-hour special Pun Gent is released by Spirit Entertainment. The special was filmed at The Lowry in Salford.
- November 28: Rich Hall's one-hour special 3:10 to Humour is released by Universal Studios. The special was filmed at the Vaudeville Theatre in London.
- November 28: Mike Stanley's album Shiner is released on Stand Up! Records.
- November 28: Josh Widdicombe's one-hour special What Do I Do Now... Live is released by Universal Studios. The special was filmed at the Hammersmith Apollo in London.

=== December ===
- December 1: Joe Matarese's one-hour special Medicated is released on Seeso. The special was filmed at The Village Underground in New York.
- December 1: Lachlan Patterson's one-hour special Live from Venice Beach is released on Seeso. The special was filmed at the Venice Ale House in Los Angeles.
- December 2: Tony Roberts's one-hour special Motorcity Motormouth is released on Showtime. The special was filmed at the Music Hall in Detroit.
- December 3: Pete Holmes's one-hour special Faces and Sounds is released on HBO. The special was filmed at The Vic Theatre in Chicago.
- December 6: Reggie Watts's one-hour special Spatial is released on Netflix. The special was filmed at the Soundstage in Los Angeles.
- December 8: Joey Diaz's one-hour special Sociably Unacceptable is released on Seeso. The special was filmed at the Zanies Comedy Club in Rosemont.
- December 9: Jim Florentine's one-hour special A Simple Man is released on VHX. The special was filmed at the George Street Playhouse in New Brunswick.
- December 9: Tom Papa's one-hour special Human Mule is released on Epix. The special was filmed at the Hanna Theatre in Cleveland.
- December 20: Gabriel Iglesias's one-hour special I'm Sorry for What I Said When I Was Hungry is released on Netflix. The special was filmed at the Allstate Arena in Chicago.
- December 22: Nick Thune's one-hour special Good Guy is released on Seeso. The special was filmed at the Star Theater in Portland.
- December 29: Ian Harvie's one-hour special May the Best Cock Win is released on Seeso. The special was filmed at the Revolution Hall in Portland.
- December 29: Laurie Kilmartin's one-hour special 45 Jokes About My Dead Dad is released on Seeso. The special was filmed at The Lyric Theatre in Los Angeles.
- December 30: Ron James's one-hour special True North is released on CBC. The special was filmed at The Grand Theatre in Kingston.
- December 31: Dawn French's one-hour special 30 Million Minutes is released on BBC Four. The special was filmed at the Vaudeville Theatre in London.

== See also ==
- List of stand-up comedians
