= 2018 in stand-up comedy =

Years in stand-up comedy
- 2015 2016 2017 2018 2019 2020 2021 2022

This is a timeline documenting events and facts about stand-up comedy in the year 2018.

== Releases ==
=== January ===
- January 5: Rob Gronkowski's special Unsportsmanlike Comedy is released on Showtime.
- January 10: Alejandro Riaño's special Especial de stand up is released on Netflix.
- January 12: Tom Segura's special Disgraceful is released on Netflix.
- January 16: Katt Williams's special Great America is released on Netflix.
- January 19: Harith Iskander's special I Told You So is released on Netflix.
- January 19: Tommy Ryman's album Having the Time of My Life is released on Stand Up! Records.
- January 23: Todd Glass's special Act Happy is released on Netflix.
- January 24: Ricardo Quevedo's special Hay gente así is released on Netflix.
- January 26: Mau Nieto's special Viviendo Sobrio... Desde el bar is released on Netflix.
- January 26: Sebastian Marcelo's special Wainraich is released on Netflix.
- January 26: Fakkah Fuzz's special Almost Banned is released on Netflix.

=== February ===
- February 2: Kavin Jayaram's special Everybody Calm Down is released on Netflix.
- February 6: Fred Armisen's special Standup for Drummers is released on Netflix.
- February 9: Eddie Griffin's special Undeniable is released on Showtime.
- February 14: Chris Rock's special Tamborine is released on Netflix.
- February 23: Ali Siddiq's special It's Bigger Than These Bars is released on Comedy Central.
- February 27: Marlon Wayan's special Woke-ish is released on Netflix.

=== March ===
- March 1: Adel Karam's special Live from Beirut is released on Netflix.
- March 2: David Heti's album And You Will Regret It on Stand Up! Records.
- March 6: Gad Elmaleh's special American Dream is released on Netflix.
- March 13: Ricky Gervais' special Humanity is released on Netflix.
- March 16: Corey Adam's album Jokes is released on Stand Up! Records.
- March 27: James Acaster's four part special Repertoire is released on Netflix.
- March 30: Keith Lowell Jensen's album Bad Comedy for Bad People is released on Stand Up! Records.

=== April ===
- April 6: Seth Rogen's special Hilarity for Charity is released on Netflix. The show is aimed at raising money and awareness for Alzheimer's and features a mix of stand-up, sketches and music. The guest lineup for the comedy special includes: Tiffany Haddish, Sarah Silverman, Michelle Wolf, John Mulaney, James Corden, The Muppets, Post Malone, Nick Kroll, Kumail Nanjiani, Sacha Baron Cohen, Jeff Goldblum, Michael Che, and Craig Robinson with his band, The Nasty Delicious.
- April 10: Greg Davies' special You Magnificent Beast is released on Netflix.
- April 24: Kevin James' special Never Don't Give Up is released on Netflix.
- April 27: Ross Bennett's album ...Not if You Were the Last Man on Earth! is released on Stand Up! Records.
- April 30: Dwight York's album Belongs in a Bar is released on Stand Up! Records.

=== May ===
- May 1: John Mulaney's special Kid Gorgeous at Radio City is released on Netflix.
- May 4: Kristine Levine's album Hey, Sailor! is released on Stand Up! Records.
- May 8: Hari Kondabolu's special Warn Your Relatives is released on Netflix.
- May 11: Kevin Smith's special Silent but Deadly is released on Showtime.
- May 13: Ali Wong's special Hard Knock Wife is released on Netflix.
- May 22: Tig Notaro's special Happy To Be Here is released on Netflix.
- May 25: Aaron Aryanpur's album Employee of the Day is released on Stand Up! Records.
- May 25: Steve Martin and Martin Short's special An Evening You Will Forget For the Rest of Your Life is released on Netflix.

=== June ===
- June 1: Daniel Humbarger's album Funny Bones is released on Stand Up! Records.
- June 1: Adam Quesnell's album "Egghead" 7-inch EP is released on Stand Up! Records.
- June 11: Cameron Esposito's Rape Jokes is released on her website.
- June 19: Hannah Gadsby's special, Nanette, is released on Netflix.

=== July ===
- July 13: Jim Jefferies' special This is Me Now is released on Netflix.
- July 13: Jim Gaffigan's special Noble Ape debuts in theaters and various digital platforms including iTunes, Amazon, Google Play, Dish TV and Verizon.
- July 24: Iliza Shlesinger's special Elder Millennial is released on Netflix.
- July 28: Stewart Lee's special Content Provider is first broadcast on BBC Two.

=== August ===
- August 10: Demetri Martin's special The Overthinker is released on Netflix.
- August 10: Henry Rollins' special Keep Talking, Pal is released on Showtime.
- August 12: Navin Noronha started touring India with his new solo “The Good Child”.
- August 24: Bert Kreischer's special Secret Time is released on Netflix.

=== September ===
- September 7: Doug Mellard's album Fart Safari 2: Fart Harder is released on Stand Up! Records.
- September 11: Daniel Sloss's two specials Dark and Jigsaw are released on Netflix.
- September 14: Adam Quesnell's album Despair II: Social Justice Warlord is released on Stand Up! Records.
- September 18: D. L. Hughley: Contrarian is released on Netflix.

=== October ===
- October 2: Joe Rogan's special Strange Times is released on Netflix.
- October 16: Ron White's special If You Quit Listening, I'll Shut Up is released on Netflix.

=== November ===
- November 20: Trevor Noah's special Trevor Noah: Son of Patricia is released on Netflix.

=== December ===
- December 7: Johnny Taylor's album Bummin' with the Devil is released on Stand Up! Records.
- December 13: David Cross's album ...America....Great... (vinyl) is released on Stand Up! Records.
- December 15: Pete Holmes' special Dirty Clean is released on HBO.
- December 18: Ellen DeGeneres's special Relatable on Netflix

== See also ==
- List of stand-up comedians
