= 2021 in stand-up comedy =

Years in stand-up comedy
- 2015 2016 2017 2018 2019 2020 2021 2022

This is a timeline documenting events and facts about English-language stand-up comedy in the year 2021.

== January ==
- January 8: Cliff Cash's album Half Way There on Stand Up! Records.
- January 10: Tig Notaro's special Drawn on HBO.
- January 12: Chris Rock's special Total Blackout: The Tamborine Extended Cut on Netflix.
- January 15: Mike Lebovitz's album Two Slob Household on Stand Up! Records.

== February ==
- February 2: K-Von's special Women Can Make Anything An Insult on Dry Bar Comedy.
- February 20: Ed Hill's special Candy and Smiley on Comedy Dynamics.
- February 21: Rose Matafeo's special Horndog on BBC Three and BBC iPlayer.
- February 23: Brian Regan's special On the Rocks on Netflix.
- February 26: Richard Pryor's albums Richard Pryor and Craps (After Hours) reissue on Omnivore Recordings.

== March ==
- March 5: James Acaster's specials Cold Lasagne Hate Myself 1999 and Make a New Tomorrow on Vimeo.
- March 9: Fern Brady's special Power & Chaos on BBC Three and BBC iPlayer.
- March 16: RebellComedy: Straight Outta the Zoo on Netflix.
- March 18: Nate Bargatze's special The Greatest Average American on Netflix.
- March 19: Chris Knutson's album Rewound on Stand Up! Records.
- March 23: Loyiso Gola's special Unlearning on Netflix.

== April ==
- April 16: Jim David's album Gay Jokes for Straight Cruisers on Stand Up! Records. 2020

== May ==
- May 8: Dylan Moran's special Dr Cosmos live-streamed on DICE.
- May 14: Simon Bird's special Debrief on All 4.
- May 27: Soy Rada's special Serendipity on Netflix.
- May 30: Bo Burnham's special Inside on Netflix.

== June ==
- June 3: Alan Saldaña's special Locked Up on Netflix.
- June 3: Josh Johnson's special #(Hashtag) on Comedy Central.

== July ==
- July 9: Lee Su-geun's special The Sense Coach on Netflix.
- July 16: Dave Losso's album A Careless Whisper of a Man on Stand Up! Records.
- July 23: Richard Pryor's album Live At The Comedy Store, 1973 reissue on Omnivore Recordings.

== August ==
- August 10: Phil Wang's special Philly Philly Wang Wang on Netflix.
- August 12: Lokillo's special Nothing's the Same on Netflix.
- August 19: Marlon Wayans's special You Know What It Is on HBO Max.
- August 31: Drew Lynch's special Concussed on YouTube channel.

== September ==
- September 3: Doug Mellard's album I'm Worried About Me on Stand Up! Records.
- September 7: Shane Gillis's special Live In Austin on gillyandkeeves.tv.
- September 17: Bill Bailey's special Larks in Transit on BBC One and BBC iPlayer.
- September 27: Jo Firestone's special Good Timing With Jo Firestone on Peacock.

== October ==
- October 5: Dave Chappelle's special The Closer on Netflix.
- October 6: Arnor Dadi's album Big, Small Town Kid on Stand Up! Records.
- October 14: One Night in Paris on Netflix.
- October 19: Theo Von's special Regular People on Netflix.
- October 23: Ricky Velez's special Here's Everything on HBO.
- October 27: Haroun on Netflix.
- October 29: Roy Wood Jr.'s special Imperfect Messenger on Comedy Central.

== November ==
- November 4: Aida Rodriguez's special Fighting Words on HBO Max.
- November 5: Jake Flores's album Bad Omen on Stand Up! Records.
- November 5: Joyelle Nicole Johnson's special Love Joy on Peacock.
- November 16: Michael Che's special Shame the Devil on Netflix.
- November 18: Carlos Ballarta's special False Prophet on Netflix.
- November 23: The Jonas Brothers Family Roast on Netflix.
- November 30: Mo Amer's special Mohammed in Texas on Netflix.

== December ==
- December 4: Drew Michael's special Red Blue Green on HBO Max.
- December 7: Nicole Byer's special BBW (Big Beautiful Weirdo) on Netflix.
- December 8: Carolin Kebekus's special The Last Christmas Special on Netflix.
- December 17: Darryl Lenox's album Super Bloom on Stand Up! Records.
- December 18: Louis C.K.'s special SORRY on his website.
- December 21: Jim Gaffigan's special Comedy Monster on Netflix.
- December 25: Jimmy Carr's special His Dark Material on Netflix.

== See also ==
- List of stand-up comedians
- List of Netflix original stand-up comedy specials
