= 2019 in stand-up comedy =

Years in stand-up comedy
- 2015 2016 2017 2018 2019 2020 2021 2022

This is a timeline documenting events and facts about English-speaking stand-up comedy in the year 2019. Comics like Gabriel Iglesisas' and Ken Jeong. There is more stand up comics but this list only documents shows and movies in which stand-up comedy might be performed .

== January ==
- January 4: Various comedians, Comedians of the World is released on Netflix.
- January 15: Sebastian Maniscalco's special Stay Hungry on Netflix.
- January 26: Amanda Seales' special I Be Knowin'! on HBO.
- January 29: Gabriel Iglesias' special One Show Fits All on Netflix.

== February ==
- February 5: Ray Romano's special Right Here, Around the Corner on Netflix.
- February 14: Ken Jeong's special You Complete Me, Ho on Netflix.
- February 22: Mike Bocchetti's album Thank You! on Stand Up! Records.

== March ==
- March 12: Bryan Callen's special Complicated Apes on digital platforms.
- March 12: Jimmy Carr's special The Best of Ultimate Gold Greatest Hits on Netflix.
- March 15: Ryan Cownie's album I Can't Die on Stand Up! Records.
- March 19: Amy Schumer's special Growing on Netflix.
- March 26: Nate Bargatze's special The Tennessee Kid on Netflix.

== April ==
- April 1: Kevin Harts's special Irresponsible on Netflix.
- April 14: Chad Daniels' album Dad Chaniels on Google Play.
- April 22: Sara Pascoe's LadsLadsLads aired on the BBC in the UK.
- April 26: Lashonda Lester's album Shondee Superstar on Stand Up! Records.
- April 30: Anthony Jeselnik's special Fire in the Maternity Ward on Netflix.

== May ==
- May 6: Nick Di Paolo's special A Breath of Fresh Air on YouTube.
- May 10: David Cross' special Oh, Come On released on digital platforms.
- May 15: Isaac Butterfield's special The Butterfield Effect on his website.
- May 15: Jimmy Shubert's album Zero Tolerance on Stand Up! Records.
- May 21: Wanda Sykes' special Not Normal on Netflix.
- May 27: Colin Quinn's special Red State Blue State released
- May 31: Corey Adam's album No Joke 2 on Stand Up! Records.

== June ==
- June 4: Miranda Sings' special Live ... Your Welcome on Netflix.
- June 7: Christian Finnegan's album 60% Joking on digital platforms.
- June 12: Jo Koy's special Comin' In Hot on Netflix.
- June 18: Adam Devine's special Best Time of Our Lives on Netflix.
- June 26: Mike Epps' special Only One Mike on Netflix.

== July ==
- July 1: Katherine Ryan's special Glitter Room on Netflix.
- July 9: Aziz Ansari's special Right Now on Netflix.
- July 13: Ian Edwards' special Bill Burr Presents Iantalk: Ideas Not Worth Spreading on Comedy Central.
- July 30: Whitney Cummings' special Can I Touch It? on Netflix.

== August ==
- August 10: Julio Torres's special My Favorite Shapes on HBO.
- August 16: Jim Gaffigan's special Quality Time on Amazon (company).
- August 20: Simon Amstell's special Set Free on Netflix.
- August 26: Dave Chappelle's special Sticks & Stones on Netflix.
- August 30: Kathleen McGee's album Deliciously Vulgar on Stand Up! Records.

== September ==
- September 6: Glenn Wool's album Creator, I Am But a Pawn on Stand Up! Records.
- September 10: Bill Burr's special Paper Tiger on Netflix.
- September 24: Jeff Dunham's special Beside Himself on Netflix.
- September 30: Mo Gilligan's special Momentum on Netflix.

== October ==
- October 1: Nikki Glaser's special Bangin' on Netflix.
- October 8: Deon Cole's special Cole Hearted on Netflix.
- October 11: Jay Chanoine's album The Texas Chanoinesaw Massacre on Stand Up! Records.
- October 18: Whitney Chitwood's album The Bakery Case on Stand Up! Records.
- October 22: Jenny Slate's special Stage Fright on Netflix.
- October 25: Robert Baril's album TMI on Stand Up! Records.
- October 29: Arsenio Hall's special Smart & Classy on Netflix.

== November ==
- November 1: Dylan Mandlsohn's album A Date with the Devil on Stand Up! Records.
- November 5: Seth Meyers' special Lobby Baby on Netflix.
- November 12: Jeff Garlin's special Our Man in Chicago on Netflix.
- November 19: Iliza Shlesinger's special Unveiled on Netflix.
- November 26: Mike Birbiglia's special The New One on Netflix.
- November 29: Andy Woodhull' special Funniest joke you’ve ever heard about being late on Dry Bar Comedy.

== December ==
- December 3: Tiffany Haddish's special Black Mitzvah on Netflix.
- December 7: Dan Soder's special Son of A Gary on HBO.
- December 10: Michelle Wolf's special Joke Show on Netflix.
- December 13: Dave Williamson's album Trying My Hardest on Stand Up! Records.
- December 17: Ronny Chieng's special Asian Comedian Destroys America on Netflix.

== See also ==
- List of stand-up comedians
