= 2020 in stand-up comedy =

Years in stand-up comedy
- 2016 2017 2018 2019 2020 2021 2022

This is a timeline documenting events and facts about English-speaking stand-up comedy in the year 2020.

== January ==
- January 3: Ilana Glazer's special The Planet Is Burning for Amazon Prime Video.
- January 14: Leslie Jones's special Time Machine on Netflix
- January 21: Fortune Feimster's special Sweet and Salty for Netflix.
- January 26: Vir Das's special For India on Netflix.
- January 28: Alex Fernándezs special The Best Comedian in the World on Netflix.
- January 28: Maria Bamford's special Weakness Is the Brand on Comedy Dynamics.

== February ==
- February 4: Tom Papa's special You're Doing Great on Netflix.
- February 11: Sam Morril's special I Got This on YouTube.
- February 22: Whitmer Thomas's special The Golden One on HBO.
- February 25: Pete Davidson's special Alive From New York on Netflix.

== March ==
- March 3: Taylor Tomlinson's special Quarter Life Crisis on Netflix.
- March 10: Marc Maron's special End Times Fun on Netflix.
- March 17: Bert Kreischer's special Hey Big Boy on Netflix.
- March 24: Tom Segura's special Ball Hog on Netflix.
- March 27: Fancy Ray McCloney's album The Best Lookin' Man in Comedy on Stand Up! Records.

== April ==
- April 4: Louis C.K.'s special Sincerely on his website.
- April 14: Chris D'Elia's special No Pain on Netflix.
- April 14: Christopher Titus's special Born With A Defect on christophertitustv.
- April 17: Amber Preston's album Sparkly Parts on Stand Up! Records.
- April 24: Derek Sheen's album Macho Caballero on Stand Up! Records.

== May ==
- May 1: Tim Harmston's album The Whim of Tim on Stand Up! Records.
- May 1: Tom Walker's mime show special Very Very on Amazon.
- May 5: Jerry Seinfeld's special 23 Hours to Kill on Netflix.
- May 8: Jimmy O. Yang's special Good Deal on Amazon.
- May 12: Mark Normand's special Out to Lunch on YouTube.
- May 19: Patton Oswalt's special I Love Everything on Netflix.
- May 19: Doug Stanhope's special The Dying of a Last Breed on Vimeo.
- May 26 Hannah Gadsby's special Douglas on Netflix.

== June ==
- June 12: Dave Chappelle's special 8:46 on YouTube.
- June 23: Eric Andre's special Legalize Everything on Netflix.
- June 30: George Lopez's special We'll Do It For Half on Netflix.

== July ==
- July 3: Hannibal Buress's special Miami Nights on YouTube.
- July 7: Jim Jefferies's special Intolerant on Netflix.
- July 17: Esther Povitsky's special Hot for My Name on Comedy Central.
- July 21: Jack Whitehall's special I'm Only Joking on Netflix.
- July 24: Jim Gaffigan's special The Pale Tourist on Amazon.
- July 24: Frankie Boyle's special Excited For You To See And Hate This on BBC 2.
- June 26: Wendy Maybury's album She's Not From Around Here on Stand Up! Records.
- June 27: Luiki Wiki's album #StandupConMadre on Stand Up! Records.
- July 31: Kelly Pryce's album Life with a Pryce on Stand Up! Records.

== August ==
- August 4: Sam Jay's special 3 in the Morning on Netflix.
- August 6: Joe List's special I Hate Myself on YouTube.
- August 20: Beth Stelling's special Girl Daddy on HBO Max.
- August 25: Dante Powell's album The Squirrels Get Fat on Stand Up! Records.

== September ==
- September 1: Felipe Esparza's special Bad Decisions on Netflix.
- September 12: Michael McIntyre's special Showman on Netflix.
- September 18: Bil Dwyer's album Am I Yelling? on Stand Up! Records.
- September 25: Glenn Wool's album Viva Forever on Stand Up! Records.

== October ==
- October 2: Chris Maddock's album Country Music Legend on Stand Up! Records.
- October 6: Lewis Black's special Thanks for Risking Your Life.
- October 23: Tim Heidecker's special An Evening With Tim Heidecker on YouTube.
- October 23: Chelsea Handler's special Evolution on HBO Max.

== November ==
- November 17: Kevin Hart's special Zero F**ks Given on Netflix.
- November 20: Doug Mellard's album Fart Safari 3: Fart Hard with a Vengeance on Stand Up! Records.
- November 27: Firesign Theater's album Dope Humor of the Seventies on Stand Up! Records.

== December ==
- December 17: James Acaster's special Cold Lasagne Hate Myself 1999 is live-streamed on DICE.
- December 22: London Hughes's special London Hughes: To Catch a D*ck on Netflix.

== See also ==
- List of stand-up comedians
