= Laugh Factory (Long Beach) =

Comedy club in Long Beach, California

The Laugh Factory
- Laugh Factory's logo
- Address: 151 South Pine Avenue; Long Beach, California; 90802
- Owner: Jamie Masada
- Capacity: 670
- Type: Comedy club

Construction
- Opened: 2008

Website
- Official website

Long Beach's Laugh Factory is part of the Laugh Factory chain of comedy clubs owned by Jamie Masada. It is located at 151 South Pine Avenue in Long Beach, California. It is the 4th Laugh Factory to open and the 3rd in Southern California.

The $10 million, 670-seat, 12,000-square-foot venue is the largest comedy venue in the world.

The Laugh Factory Long Beach held its Grand Opening on September 20, 2008.

== Stand-Up Comedy Hall of Fame and Museum ==
The Long Beach Laugh Factory is home to the official Laugh Factory Stand-Up Comedy Hall of Fame and Museum, which holds comedy memorabilia from notable comedians.
