= Laugh Factory =

American comedy club chain

Coordinates: 34°5′52.8″N 118°21′52.1″W

The Laugh Factory
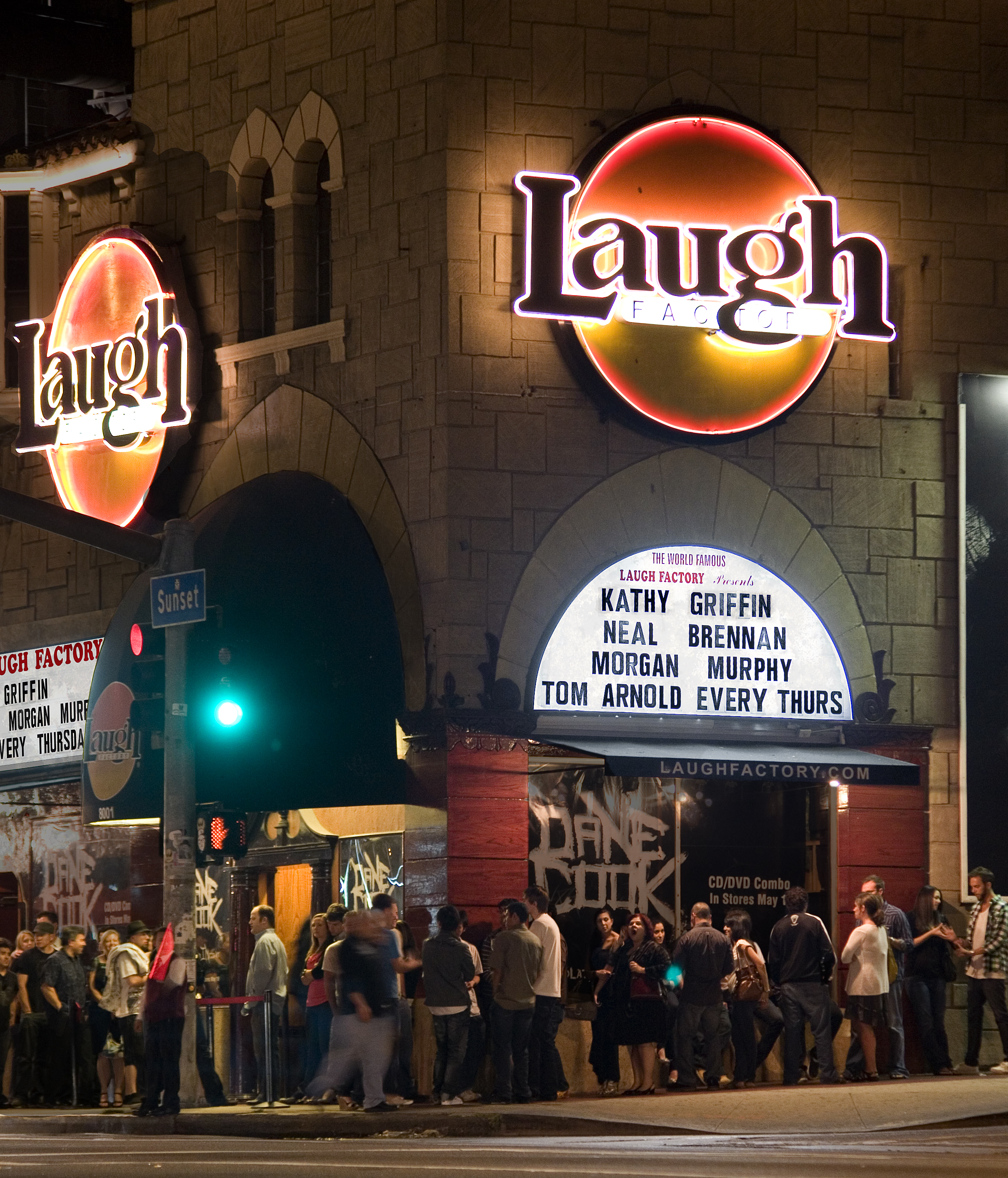
- The Original Laugh Factory in Hollywood, California
- Interactive map of The Laugh Factory
- Address: 8001 Sunset Boulevard; Hollywood, California; 90046
- Owner: Jamie Masada
- Capacity: Hollywood: 300
- Type: Comedy club

Construction
- Opened: 1979

Website
- laughfactory.com

Laugh Factory is a chain of comedy clubs in the United States. The chain is owned by Laugh Factory Inc., and the founder and current chief executive is Jamie Masada.

== Endurance record ==
The Laugh Factory keeps track of an endurance record for the comedian who can deliver the longest single set at the club. The record-holding performances are listed below:

Date	Duration (hr:min)	Performer
1980	2:41	Richard Pryor
April 10, 2007	3:50	Dane Cook
April 15, 2007	6:07	Dave Chappelle
December 3, 2007	6:12	Dave Chappelle
January 2, 2008	7:34	Dane Cook

== Acts of charity ==
On December 8, 2010, at 4:38 pm, the Laugh Factory broke the Guinness World Record for "Longest Continuous Stand Up Comedy Show (Multiple Comedians)". The record was previously held by Comic Strip Live that set the original record of 50 hours. The Laugh Factory surpassed 50 hours on Wednesday and continued non-stop until 10:38 pm, Thursday, December 9, setting a new record of 80 hours. Dom Irrera was on stage when the record was broken, and Deon Cole was on stage when the new record was set. The event, titled "Toy to the World", was paired with a Toy Drive for Children's Hospital. Over 130 different comedians performed, and the event was live-streamed over the internet. The Laugh Factory held this record until April 15, 2015, when the record was broken by jokesters at The East Room in Nashville, Tennessee.

Charity fundraisers have been held at the club, including benefit nights for the Red Cross, USO, Cops for Causes, Comics Without Borders, Wounded Warriors, Middle Eastern Comedy Fest, and Stand Up for India.

== Locations ==
Outlets of the chain are located in:

- Chicago
- Hollywood
- Las Vegas, Nevada at the Horseshoe Las Vegas
- Long Beach
- Reno
- San Diego
- Covina
