= Kavin Jayaram =

- Born: Kavin s/o Jayaram; 25 February 1980 (age 46); Kuala Lumpur
- Other names: Kavin Jay
- Occupations: Comedian, radio announcer
- Years active: 2006-present
- Spouse: Nisha Gopalan (m. 2010)

Kavin Jayaram (born 25 February 1980) also known as Kavin Jay is a stand-up comedian and a former co-host of The REDjam on Red FM

== Early life ==
Kavin was born in Malaysia and graduated from Methodist Boys' School (Kuala Lumpur) on 1997. He later continued his studies at South Tyneside College, Newcastle and graduated in 2001. He then became a Marine Engineer but Kavin's late brother had always wanted him to be a comedian, thus citing him as an inspiration that made him get serious with stand up comedy after the death of his only sibling in May 2006. Kavin's influences for his comedy are Robin Williams, Chris Rock and Eddie Izzard.

== Career ==
=== 2006: First Show ===
Kavin's first show was at The Actors Studio in August 2006 which was a letdown for him. He went on to perform many shows with his cousin Andrew Peter Netto calling themselves the Comedy Cousins.

=== 2008: Young Comedians of Malaysia (YCOM) ===
Kavin and a few friends started YCOM to function as a platform of support for upcoming comedians. He together with this young group of comedians performed regularly at various shows in Kuala Lumpur, one of them is the Timeout KL's Comedy Thursday's.

=== 2009: Big break ===
His big break on stage arrived when he performed as the opening act at the Comedy Club KL's Wacky X'mas show in December 2009 which was headlined by Irish comedian Dave Callan. Since then Kavin became a regular performer for Comedy Club KL

=== 2010: St. Patricks Day ===
Kavin performed at the St.Patricks Day celebrations to a strong crowd of 15000 people.

=== 2011: Goodflers and Football Overload ===
Kavin formed his own comedy group Goodflers together with comedians Jason Leong and Rizal Van Geyzel. So far they have organized sold-out tours in the Klang Valley, Penang and Hong Kong. Kavin joined Astro SuperSport as co host of the show Football Overload with Jay Menon, Adam C, Reem Shahwa and Roshan Narayan.

=== 2012: One Mic Stand and TedxKL ===
Kavin together with Rizal founded and continue to host One Mic Stand PJ Live Arts which is a weekly open mic session for promoting new and up-and-coming stand up comedians. He was also invited to be a presenter for TedxKualaLumpur 2012.

=== 2016: Maharaja Lawak Mega 2016 ===
Kavin joined the comedy reality show, Maharaja Lawak Mega 2016 in Malay language. He was the first non-Muslim to join this comedy reality show. He did his stand up comedy in the Malay language. He lasted only 3 weeks before he was eliminated.

=== 2018: Kavin Jay: Everybody Calm Down ===
On a mission to defy stereotypes, Malaysian stand-up comedian Kavin Jay shares stories about growing up in the VHS era with his Singapore audience.

== Personal life ==
Kavin married Nisha Gopalan on May 16, 2010.
