= Maggie Faris =

American comedian

Maggie Faris is an American comedian from Minnesota.

Faris attended St. Kate's College. She began performing comedy in 1999. She has released four comedy albums. A lesbian, she jokes about her life experiences and observations.

She grew up in Minneapolis and Sunfish Lake, Minnesota. She has performed at Sisyphus Brewing. In 2023 she won the Loons on the Lake Comedy Festival.

She appeared on the KS95 Morning Show. In 2023, Faris started a business called "Extreme Ice Cream," selling frozen treats from a tricycle. Faris also sold a giant shoe on Facebook Marketplace.

== Albums ==
- Hot Lesbo Action (2015)
- A Dingus Among Us (2017)
- Tougher Than a Honeybee (2022)
- Extreme Relaxation (2023)
