= 2022 in stand-up comedy =

Years in stand-up comedy
- 2017 2018 2019 2020 2021 2022 2023

This is a timeline documenting events and facts about English-speaking stand-up comedy in the year 2022.

== January ==
- January 20: Moses Storm's special Trash White on HBO Max.
- January 25: Aziz Ansari's special Nightclub Comedian on Netflix.
- January 27: River Butcher's special A Different Kind of Dude on HBO Max.

== February ==
- February 7: David Cross's special I'M FROM THE FUTURE.
- February 8: Ms. Pat's special Y'all Wanna Hear Something Crazy? on Netflix.
- February 10: Ian Lara's special Growing Shame on Comedy Central Stand-Up.
- February 14: Ali Wong's special Don Wong on Netflix.
- February 17: Mo Gilligan's special There's Mo to Life on Netflix.
- February 18: Eddie Izzard's special Wunderbar on Amazon Prime Video.
- February 24: Yedoye Travis's special Bury Me Loose on Comedy Central Stand-Up.
- February 28: Chappelle's Home Team - Earthquake's special Legendary on Netflix.

== March ==
- March 8: Taylor Tomlinson's special Look at You on Netflix.
- March 10: Ismael Loutfi's special Sound It Out on Comedy Central Stand-Up.
- March 15: Catherine Cohen's special The Twist ...? She’s Gorgeous on Netflix.
- March 22: Jeff Foxworthy's special The Good Old Days on Netflix.
- March 24: Amy Miller's special Ham Mouth on Comedy Central Stand-Up.
- March 29: Mike Epps's special Indiana Mike on Netflix.

== April ==
- April 1: Jerrod Carmichael's special Rothaniel on HBO.
- April 5: Ronny Chieng's special Speakeasy on Netflix.
- April 7: Caleb Synan's special 30 on Comedy Central Stand-Up.
- April 15: Bill Maher's special #Adulting on HBO Max.
- April 21: Marlon Wayans Presents: The Headliners on HBO Max.
- April 26: David Spade's special Nothing Personal on Netflix.
- April 28: Brendan Schaub's special The Gringo Papi on YouTube.
- April 30: Joe List's special This Year's Material on YouTube.

== May ==
- May 3: Chris DiStefano's special Speshy Weshy on Netflix.
- May 8: Christina P's special Mom Genes on Netflix.
- May 17: Katt Williams's special World War III on Netflix.
- May 19: The Hall: Honoring the Greats of Stand-Up on Netflix.
- May 19: Ali Siddiq's special The Domino Effect on Comedy Central Stand-Up.
- May 19: Yannis Pappas's special Mom Love on YanniLongDays.
- May 24: Ricky Gervais's special Supernature on Netflix.
- May 27: Fahim Anwar's special Hat Trick.
- May 30: Bo Burnham's special THE INSIDE OUTTAKES.
- May 30: Norm Macdonald's special Nothing Special on Netflix.

== June ==
- June 1: John Crist's special What Are We Doing on johnbcrist.
- June 6: Bill Burr Presents: Friends Who Kill on Netflix.
- June 6: Stavros Halkias's special Live At The Lodge Room on YouTube.
- June 9: Stand Out: An LGBTQ+ Celebration on Netflix.
- June 11: Amy Schumer's special Parental Advisory on Netflix.
- June 13: Pete Davidson Presents: The Best Friends on Netflix.
- June 14: Jane Fonda & Lily Tomlin: Ladies Night Live on Netflix.
- June 16: Snoop Dogg's special F*cn Around Comedy on Netflix.
- June 21: Joel Kim Booster's special Psychosexual on Netflix.
- June 23: Kyle Kinane's special Trampoline in a Ditch on YouTube.
- June 23: Paul Virzi's special Nocturnal Admissions on Netflix.
- June 28: Cristela Alonzo's special Middle Classy on Netflix.

== July ==
- July 1: Jim Breuer's special Somebody Had to Say It on Breuer's Breuniverse.
- July 7: Dave Chappelle's special What’s in a Name? on Netflix.
- July 12: Bill Burr's special Live At Red Rocks on Netflix.
- July 16: Nikki Glaser's special Good Clean Filth on HBO Max.
- July 17: Andrew Schulz's special Infamous on Moment House.
- July 18: Alonzo Bodden's special Stupid Don't Get Tired on Helium Comedy Studios.
- July 19: David A. Arnold's special It Ain't for the Weak on Netflix.
- July 22: Josh Widdicombe's special Bit Much... on Channel 4 and All 4.
- July 26: Whitney Cummings's special Jokes on Netflix.

== August ==
- August 5: Jesus Sepulveda's special Mr. Tough Life on HBO Max.
- August 11: Bo Burnham's special The Inside Outtakes on Netflix.
- August 12: Mo Alexander's album Mo’ Possum Blues on Stand Up! Records.
- August 16: Tim Dillon's special A Real Hero on Netflix.
- August 31: Chris Redd's special The Half Hour on Comedy Central Stand-Up.

== September ==
- September 1: Sam Morril's special Same Time Tomorrow on Netflix.
- September 2: Jim Breuer's special Silly In San Diego on Breuer's Breuniverse.
- September 4: Stewart Lee's special Snowflake on BBC Two and BBC iPlayer.
- September 6: Sheng Wang's special Sweet and Juicy on Netflix.
- September 6: Rodrigo Marques's special King of Uncouth on Netflix.
- September 13: Jo Koy's special Live from the Los Angeles Forum on Netflix.
- September 14: Raanan Hershberg's special Jokes from the Underground on YouTube.
- September 20: Patton Oswalt's special We All Scream on Netflix.
- September 27: Nick Kroll's special Little Big Boy on Netflix.
- September 29: Stewart Lee's special Tornado on BBC Two and BBC iPlayer.
- September 30: Auggie Smith's album Cult Following (reissue) on Stand Up! Records.

== October ==
- October 4: Hasan Minhaj's special The King's Jester on Netflix.
- October 5: Dane Cook's special Above It All on moment.com.
- October 8: Robert Kelly's special Kill Box on Louisck.com.
- October 11: Iliza Shlesinger's special Hot Forever on Netflix.
- October 13: Rachel Bradley's special Alpha Chick on Youtube.
- October 14: Josh Blue's album Broccoli on Stand Up! Records.
- October 18: Gabriel Iglesias's special Stadium Fluffy Live From Los Angeles on Netflix.
- October 25: Fortune Feimster's special Good Fortune on Netflix.
- October 27: Ryan Goldsher's special Many People on YouTube.
- October 28: Auggie Smith's album Smell the Thunder (reissue) on Stand Up! Records.

== November ==
- November 2: Ari Shaffir's special JEW on YouTube.
- November 3: Chris Redd's special Why Am I Like This? on HBO Max.
- November 8: Neal Brennan's special Blocks on Netflix.
- November 10: Lee Kimbrell's special Mike & Molly on YouTube.
- November 12: Lil Rel Howery's special I Said It. Y'all Thinking It. on HBO
- November 15: Deon Cole's special Charleen's Boy on Netflix.
- November 22: Trevor Noah's special I Wish You Would on Netflix.
- November 23: Blake Hammond's special Blake 182 on YouTube.
- November 25: Jeff Dunham's special Me the People on Comedy Central.
- November 29: Romesh Ranganathan's special The Cynic on Netflix.

== December ==
- December 2: Anthony Bonazzo's special Northside Southside on YouTube.
- December 6: Sebastian Maniscalco's special Is it Me? on Netflix.
- December 10: Atsuko Okatsuka's special The Intruder on HBO.
- December 13: Tom Papa's special What A Day! on Netflix.
- December 15: Jerry Law's special Jerry Law 2 Raw on YouTube.
- December 22: Chris Weir's special Chris Weir: Live in Cincinnati on YouTube.
- December 25: Vir Das's special Landing on Netflix.
- December 27: Chelsea Handler's special Revolution on Netflix.
- December 29: Wyatt Feegrado's special De-Assimilate on YouTube
- December 30: Jason Manford's special Recent Nostalgia on BBC One and BBC iPlayer.
- December 31: Best of Stand-Up 2022 on Netflix.

== See also ==
- List of stand-up comedians
- List of Netflix original stand-up comedy specials
