= San Jose Improv =

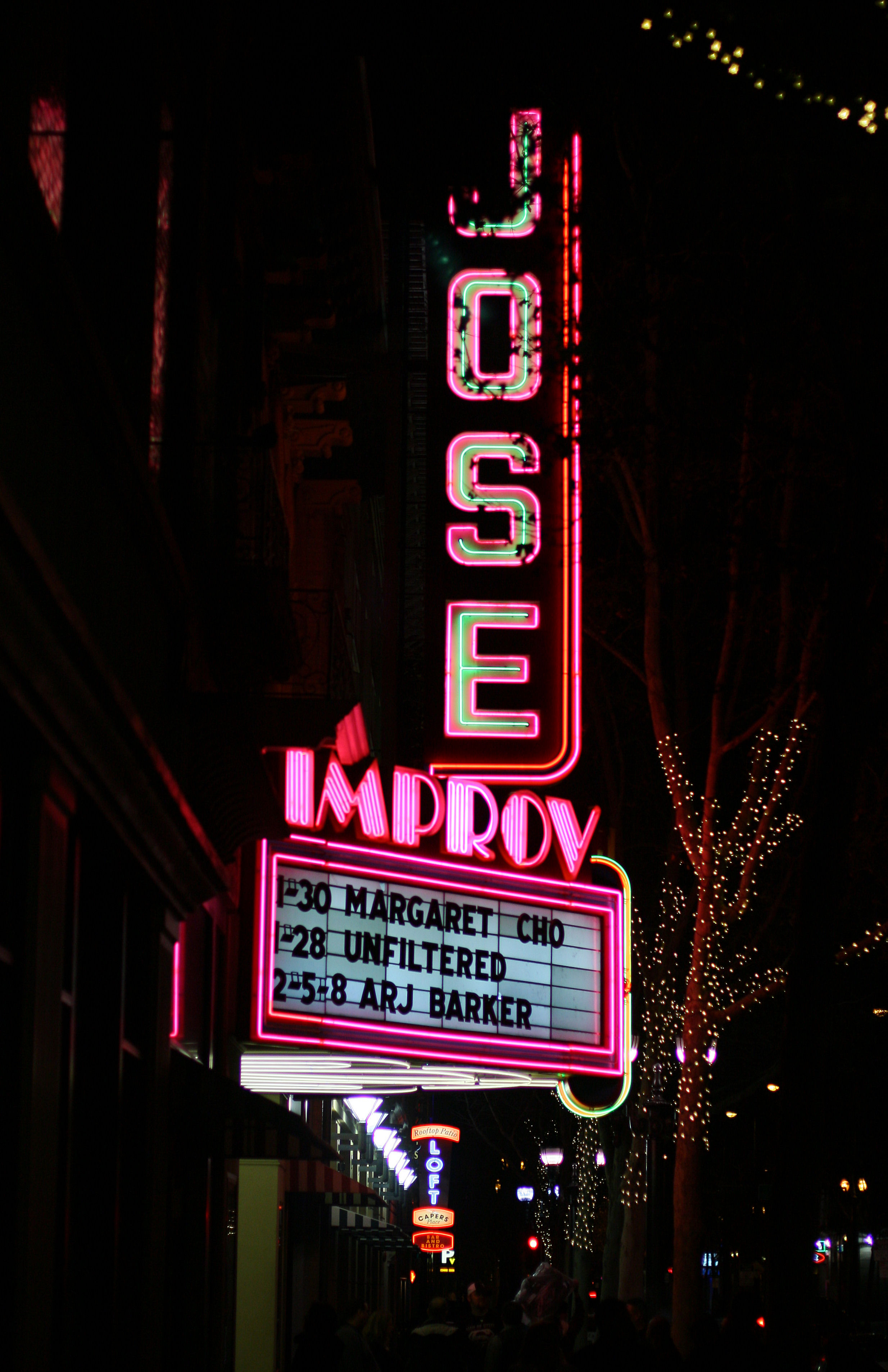
- San Jose Improv in 2009
- Former names: Jose Theater
- Address: 62 S Second St
- Location: San Jose, California
- Owner: Levity Entertainment Group
- Capacity: 450
- Type: Comedy club

Construction
- Opened: 1904
- Architectural style: Palazzo
- Architect: William Binder

Website
- improv.com/sanjose

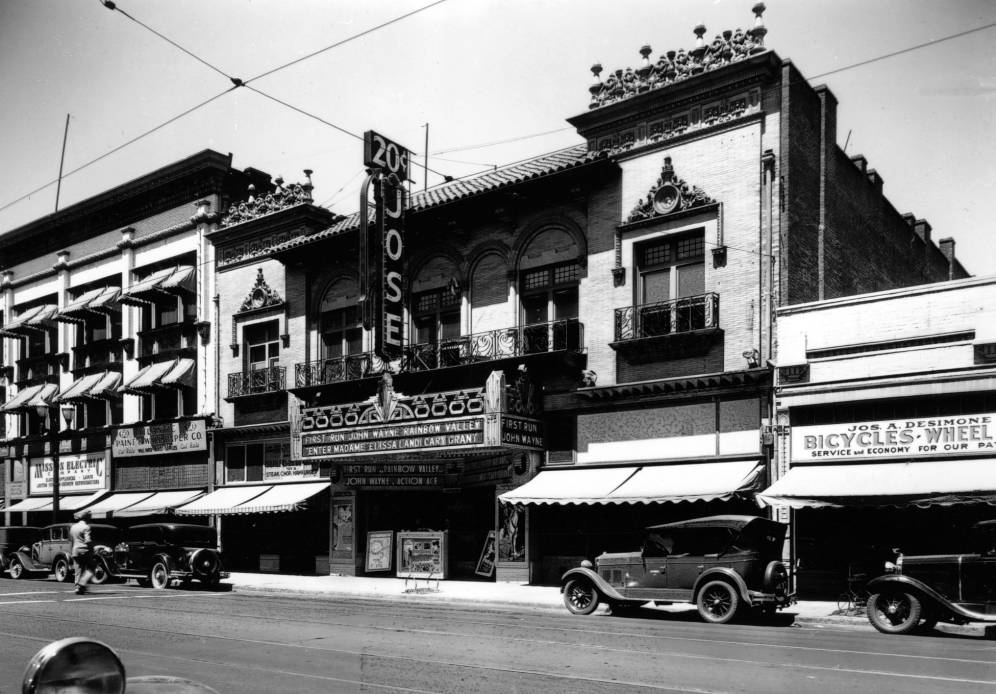
Jose Theatre built in 1904, this photo taken in 1935

The San Jose Improv (formerly known as the Jose Theater) is a comedy club located at 62 South Second Street in downtown San Jose, California.

== History ==
The building that hosts the San Jose Improv was built in 1904 and was originally known as the Jose Theater. It is the oldest theater in San Jose, located at 62 South Second Street, near San Fernando Street. Construction of the Jose was started in 1903, under the ownership of David Jacks, a Monterey landowner (who was the namesake of Monterrey Jack cheese). The building was designed in the Italian palazzo style by William Binder, a local architect who went on to design a number of other theaters and buildings around San Jose in the early 20th century.

In its earlier days, the theater was a popular showcase for stock companies and vaudeville acts. By the middle of the 20th century, it was showing movies. At points throughout its history, the theater has also hosted drag and burlesque shows and has served as a rock music venue.

Despite rumors, neither Charlie Chaplin nor Harry Houdini ever performed at this location, although both toured through nearby San Francisco.

The theater was damaged in the 1989 Loma Prieta earthquake and subsequently closed. It was nearly demolished in the 1990s, but it was saved when the city Redevelopment Agency purchased the building and performed renovations and seismic repairs. The San Jose franchise of Improv Comedy Club moved into the newly-opened space in 2002, where it continues to operate as of 2026.

== Venue ==
The auditorium has a capacity of 450 seats, with the main seating area and stage on the lower level and a balcony on the upper level. There is also a full-sized kitchen on site. The club hosts shows from Tuesday through Sunday every week.
