= Irresponsible Tour =

2017–18 comedy tour by comedian Kevin Hart

- Tour by Kevin Hart
- Start date: September 9, 2017
- End date: December 13, 2018
- Legs: 5
- No. of shows: 120
- Website: kevinhartnation.com/portfolio/irresponsible-tour-2017/

Kevin Hart concert chronology
- What Now? Tour (2015-16); Irresponsible Tour (2017-18); Reality Check Tour (2022)

The Irresponsible Tour was the sixth comedy tour by American comedian, actor and producer Kevin Hart. The tour began on September 9, 2017, in Macon, Georgia at Macon City Auditorium and concluded on January 13, 2019, in Pensacola, Florida at The Pensacola Bay Center comprising 119 shows. It was filmed by Leslie Small for the comedy special Kevin Hart: Irresponsible (2019).

== Background ==
The 2017 leg of the tour was officially announced by Hart on his Twitter account on October 16, 2017. Hart stated "that is only the 1st leg of the tour, if you didn't see your city don't worry, I'm definitely making all stops #IrresponsibleTour". The 2018 portion of the tour was officially announced on January 29, 2018, via a trailer for the tour on YouTube. It was published by Hart's own network, LOL Network. Live Nation was also confirmed to be the sponsor of the tour.

== Critical reception ==
=== Europe ===
In a review for Go London, Bruce Dessau stated "Hart is tremendously amiable, while rarely venturing towards anything contentious. His edgiest riff tackled being the only black man holidaying on an Aspen ski slope until, much to his comedic chagrin, he bumped into fellow superstar Seal, 'during my black week'. Undemanding, uncontroversial, but undeniably funny." He reviewed the show at O2 Arena in London.

== Shows ==
List of concerts, showing date, city, country, venue, tickets sold, number of available tickets, and amount of gross revenue
Date	City	Country	Venue	Attendance	Revenue
Leg 1- North America
September 9, 2017	Macon	United States	Macon City Auditorium	—	—
September 10, 2017	Macon	United States	Macon City Auditorium	—	—
September 16, 2017	Asheville	United States	Thomas Wolfe Auditorium	—	—
September 17, 2017	Asheville	United States	Thomas Wolfe Auditorium	—	—
September 23, 2017	Columbus	United States	Bill Heard Theater	—	—
October 7, 2017	Augusta	United States	Bell Auditorium	—	—
October 8, 2017	Augusta	United States	Bell Auditorium	—	—
October 21, 2017	Shreveport	United States	Shreveport Municipal Auditorium	—	—
October 22, 2017	Shreveport	United States	Shreveport Municipal Auditorium	—	—
October 28, 2017	Mobile	United States	Mobile Civic Center	—	—
October 29, 2017	Mobile	United States	Mobile Civic Center	—	—
November 10, 2017	Santa Barbara	United States	Arlington Theater	—	—
November 11, 2017	Santa Barbara	United States	Arlington Theater	—	—
November 12, 2017	Oxnard	United States	Oxnard PAC	—	—
November 16, 2017	Long Beach	United States	Terrace Theater	—	—
November 17, 2017	Riverside	United States	Fox Performing Arts Center	—	—
November 19, 2017	Pasadena	United States	Pasadena Civic Auditorium	—	—
December 21, 2017	Hollywood	United States	Seminole Hard Rock Hotel & Casino	—	—
December 30, 2017	Uncasville	United States	Mohegan Sun Arena	9,340 / 9,340	$1,049,010
December 31, 2017	Orlando	United States	CFE Arena	—	—
January 12, 2018	Knoxville	United States	Thompson–Boling Arena	7,017 / 14,468	$419,903
January 13, 2018	Estero	United States	Hertz Arena	6,419 / 6,640	$444,200
January 14, 2018	Southaven	United States	Landers Center	7,873 / 8,105	$531,535
January 19, 2018	Fargo	United States	Fargodome	5,227 / 7,828	$281,353
January 20, 2018	Sioux City	United States	Tyson Events Center	7,427 / 7,519	$417,506
January 21, 2018	Madison	United States	Alliant Energy Center	7,642 / 7,814	$451,437
January 26, 2018	Roanoke	United States	Berglund Center	10,291 / 12,059	$652,532
January 27, 2018	Dayton	United States	Ervin J. Nutter Center	10,349 / 10,507	$687,410
January 28, 2018	Evansville	United States	Ford Center	8,627 / 9,197	$568,445
February 2, 2018	Minneapolis	United States	Target Center	—	—
February 9, 2018	Kalamazoo	United States	Wings Event Center	5,081 / 5,356	$405,634
February 10, 2018	Cedar Rapids	United States	U.S Cellular Center	5,961 / 5,961	$440,607
February 11, 2018	Springfield	United States	Bank of Springfield Center	6,680 / 6,822	$530,723
March 9, 2018	Amherst	United States	Mullins Center	6,329 / 6,508	$433,367
March 10, 2018	Portland	United States	Cross Insurance Arena	6,185 / 6,367	$527,242
March 11, 2018	Syracuse	United States	Oncenter War Memorial Arena	—	—
March 16, 2018	Wilkes-Barre	United States	Mohegan Sun Arena at Casey Plaza	7,373 / 7,491	$646,978
March 17, 2018	Bridgeport	United States	Webster Bank Arena	7,962 / 8,114	$632,574
March 22, 2018	Reading	United States	Santander Arena	8,081 / 8,237	$651,163
March 23, 2018	Baltimore	United States	Royal Farms Arena	24,431 / 26,353	$1,763,923
March 24, 2018	Baltimore	United States	Royal Farms Arena	24,431 / 26,353	$1,763,923
March 25, 2018	Richmond	United States	Richmond Coliseum	11,402 / 12,357	$775,614
March 30, 2018	Hampton	United States	Hampton Coliseum	9,486 / 9,924	$774,965
March 31, 2018	Charlotte	United States	Spectrum Center	16,927 / 17,475	$1,171,026
April 1, 2018	Raleigh	United States	PNC Arena	—	—
April 6, 2018	Birmingham	United States	Legacy Arena at The BJCC	—	—
April 7, 2018	Jacksonville	United States	Veterans Memorial Arena	—	—
April 8, 2018	Atlanta	United States	Philips Arena	14,874 / 15,922	$1,346,718
April 13, 2018	St. Louis	United States	Scottrade Center	—	—
April 14, 2018	Chicago	United States	United Center	—	—
April 15, 2018	Chicago	United States	United Center	—	—
April 20, 2018	London	Canada	Budweiser Gardens	9,973 / 9,973	$655,136
April 21, 2018	Hamilton	Canada	FirstOntario Centre	—	—
April 22, 2018	Manchester	United States	SNHU Arena	—	—
April 27, 2018	Kansas City	United States	Sprint Center	—	—
April 28, 2018	Little Rock	United States	Verizon Arena	—	—
April 29, 2018	Louisville	United States	KFC Yum! Center	—	—
May 4, 2018	Halifax	Canada	Scotiabank Centre	—	—
May 5, 2018	Rochester	United States	Blue Cross Arena	—	—
May 6, 2018	Buffalo	United States	KeyBank Center	—	—
May 11, 2018	Fresno	United States	Save Mart Center	—	—
May 12, 2018	Bakersfield	United States	Rabobank Arena	—	—
May 13, 2018	Ontario	United States	Citizens Business Bank Arena	—	—
May 17, 2018	Omaha	United States	CenturyLink Center	—	—
May 18, 2018	Indianapolis	United States	Bankers Life Fieldhouse	—	—
May 19, 2018	Cincinnati	United States	U.S Bank Arena	—	—
May 25, 2018	Saratoga Springs	United States	Saratoga Performing Arts Center	—	—
May 26, 2018	Atlantic City	United States	Boardwalk Hall	—	—
June 1, 2018	Winnipeg	Canada	MTS Centre	—	—
June 2, 2018	Saskatoon	Canada	SaskTel Centre	—	—
June 3, 2018	Regina	Canada	Brandt Centre	—	—
June 7, 2018	Los Angeles	United States	Hollywood Bowl	—	—
June 8, 2018	Calgary	Canada	Scotiabank Saddledome	—	—
June 9, 2018	Edmonton	Canada	Rogers Place	—	—
June 10, 2018	Boise	United States	Ford Idaho Center	—	—
June 14, 2018	Seattle	United States	KeyArena	—	—
June 15, 2018	Portland	United States	Moda Center	—	—
June 16, 2018	Vancouver	Canada	Rogers Arena	15,610 / 18,094	$940,874
June 21, 2018	Mountain View	United States	Shoreline Amphitheatre	—	—
June 22, 2018	Concord	United States	Concord Pavilion	—	—
June 23, 2018	Irvine	United States	FivePoint Amphitheatre	—	—
June 29, 2018	Denver	United States	Pepsi Center	—	—
June 30, 2018	Salt Lake City	United States	Viviant Smart Home Arena	—	—
July 1, 2018	Phoenix	United States	Talking Stick Resort Arena	—	—
July 6, 2018	Las Vegas	United States	MGM Grand Garden Arena	—	—
July 7, 2018	San Diego	United States	Viejas Arena	—	—
July 13, 2018	Mansfield	United States	Xfinity Center	—	—
July 14, 2018	Camden	United States	BB&T Pavilion	—	—
July 15, 2018	Bethel	United States	Bethel Woods Center for the Arts	—	—
July 20, 2018	Ottawa	Canada	Canadian Tire Centre	—	—
July 21, 2018	Toronto	Canada	Scotiabank Arena	—	—
July 22, 2018	Grand Rapids	United States	Van Andel Arena	9,452 / 9,452	$692,199
July 27, 2018	Montreal	Canada	Bell Centre- Just For Laughs Festival	—	—
July 28, 2018	Newark	United States	Prudential Center	—	—
July 29, 2018	Uniondale	United States	Nassau Coliseum	10,890 / 14,496	$881,914
August 3, 2018	West Palm Beach	United States	Coral Sky Amphitheatre	—	—
August 4, 2018	Tampa	United States	Amalie Arena	—	—
August 5, 2018	Biloxi	United States	Mississippi Coast Coliseum	—	—
Leg 2- Europe
August 15, 2018	Reykjavik	Iceland	Laugardalshöll	—	—
August 16, 2018	Copenhagen	Denmark	Royal Arena	—	—
August 17, 2018	Oslo	Norway	Vallhall Arena	—	—
August 18, 2018	Stockholm	Sweden	Ericsson Globe	—	—
August 19, 2018	Gothenburg	Sweden	Scandinavium	—	—
August 21, 2018	Dublin	Ireland	3Arena	—	—
August 22, 2018	Paris	France	Olympia	—	—
August 24, 2018	Amsterdam	Netherlands	Ziggo Dome	—	—
August 25, 2018	Antwerp	Belgium	Sportpaleis Antwerp	—	—
August 26, 2018	Berlin	Germany	Mercedes-Benz Arena	—	—
August 27, 2018	Cologne	Germany	Lanxess Arena	—	—
August 28, 2018	Glasgow	United Kingdom	SSE Hydro	—	—
August 30, 2018	Birmingham	United Kingdom	Barclaycard Arena	—	—
August 31, 2018	Manchester	United Kingdom	Manchester Arena	18,412 / 18,668	$1,214,250
September 2, 2018	London	United Kingdom	O2 Arena	38,836 / 50,485	$3,826,180
September 3, 2018	London	United Kingdom	O2 Arena	38,836 / 50,485	$3,826,180
September 4, 2018	London	United Kingdom	O2 Arena	38,836 / 50,485	$3,826,180
Leg 3- North America
September 13, 2018	Milwaukee	United States	Fiserv Forum	—	—
September 14, 2018	Columbus	United States	Nationwide Arena	—	—
September 15, 2018	Washington, D.C.	United States	Capital One Arena	17,307 / 18,597	$1,488,145
September 16, 2018	Poughkeepsie	United States	Mid-Hudson Civic Center	—	—
September 21, 2018	Boston	United States	TD Garden	—	—
September 22, 2018	University Park	United States	Bryce Jordan Center	—	—
September 27, 2018	New York City	United States	Madison Square Garden	—	—
September 28, 2018	Wallingford	United States	Toyota Oakdale Theatre	—	—
September 29, 2018	Holmdel	United States	PNC Bank Arts Center	—	—
September 30, 2018	Columbia	United States	Township Auditorium	—	—
October 4, 2018	Cleveland	United States	Quicken Loans Arena	—	—
October 5, 2018	Detroit	United States	Little Caesars Arena	—	—
October 6, 2018	Nashville	United States	Bridgestone Arena	14,770 / 14,770	$1,122,351
October 7, 2018	Greenville	United States	Bon Secours Wellness Arena	—	—
January 13, 2019 (rescheduled from October 11, 2018, due to Hurricane Michael)	Pensacola	United States	Pensacola Bay Center	—	—
October 13, 2018	Miami	United States	American Airlines Arena	—	—
October 18, 2018	New Orleans	United States	Smoothie King Center	—	—
October 19, 2018	Houston	United States	Toyota Center	12,915 /13,380	$1,265,609
October 21, 2018	Corpus Christi	United States	Selena Auditorium	—	—
October 25, 2018	El Paso	United States	Abraham Chavez Theatre	—	—
October 26, 2018	Dallas	United States	American Airlines Center	23,399 / 25,686	$2,018,446
October 27, 2018	Dallas	United States	American Airlines Center	23,399 / 25,686	$2,018,446
October 28, 2018	Tulsa	United States	BOK Center	—	—
November 1, 2018	San Antonio	United States	AT&T Center	—	—
November 2, 2018	Austin	United States	Frank Erwin Center	—	—
November 3, 2018	Oklahoma City	United States	Chesapeake Energy Arena	—	—
November 4, 2018	Tucson	United States	Tucson Music Hall	—	—
November 16, 2018	Sacramento	United States	Golden 1 Center	—	—
November 17, 2018	Oakland	United States	Oracle Arena	11,487 / 16,127	$968,221
November 18, 2018	Reno	United States	Grand Theatre	—	—
November 23, 2018	Pittsburgh	United States	PPG Paints Arena	—	—
November 24, 2018	Philadelphia	United States	Wells Fargo Center	—	—
November 27, 2018	Anchorage	United States	Sullivan Arena	—	—
November 29, 2018	Honolulu	United States	Neal S. Blaisdell Arena	10,320 / 12,110	$981,940
November 30, 2018	Honolulu	United States	Neal S. Blaisdell Arena	10,320 / 12,110	$981,940
Leg 4- Oceania
December 3, 2018	Perth	Australia	Perth Arena	12,394 / 13,095	$1,129,220
December 5, 2018	Melbourne	Australia	Rod Laver Arena	—	—
December 6, 2018	Melbourne	Australia	Rod Laver Arena	—	—
December 7, 2018	Sydney	Australia	Qudos Bank Arena	—	—
December 8, 2018	Sydney	Australia	Qudos Bank Arena	—	—
December 9, 2018	Brisbane	Australia	Brisbane Entertainment Centre	—	—
December 11, 2018	Auckland	New Zealand	Spark Arena	—	—
Leg 5- Asia
December 13, 2018	Singapore		Suntec City	—	—
Total				—	—
