= Jamie Masada =

American businessman and comedian (born 1954)

- Born: 1954 (age 71–72); Pahlavi Iran

Comedy career
- Years active: 1979–present
- Medium: Comedy club owner, television producer

Jamie Masada (Persian: جمی ماسادا; born in Pahlavi Iran) is a Persian American businessman and comedian. He is the founder of the Laugh Factory, a chain of comedy clubs in several states.

== Early years ==
Masada is a Persian Jewish immigrant from Iran who had arrived in America as a teenager. Despite the fact that he was living in a garage and barely spoke English, he combined Persian and Hebrew and soon was working with professional comedians like Richard Pryor, Jay Leno, David Letterman and Redd Foxx.

== Career ==
=== Laugh Factory ===
In 1979, Masada used a loan from Neal Israel to open the Laugh Factory on Sunset Boulevard. While other comedy club owners in Los Angeles were not paying the comedians, his goal was to create a venue where comedians could perform and earn money by "splitting the door".

=== The Laugh Factory Presents ===
The Laugh Factory Presents is an online stand-up comedy series, which Masada created for up-and-coming comedians to spread their material to a wider audience via YouTube and Amazon.com. Masada's plan is to film comedians' shows on the Laugh Factory stage and allow them to keep 80% of the profits made from the specials. With the help of Laugh Factory New Media, Masada produced two The Laugh Factory Presents specials, The Laugh Factory Presents Tim Gaither Live from Las Vegas and The Laugh Factory Presents Raj Sharma Live from Las Vegas.

== Honors and awards ==
In recognition of all his hard work, Masada is the recipient of the Ellis Island Medal of Honor, the ACLU Freedom of Speech Award and the NAACP Freedom Award. In 2011, Masada received an award from Didi Hirsch Mental Health Services for being a Comedy Innovator and Humanitarian and for offering comics a listening ear to deal with their personal demons.

== Philanthropy ==
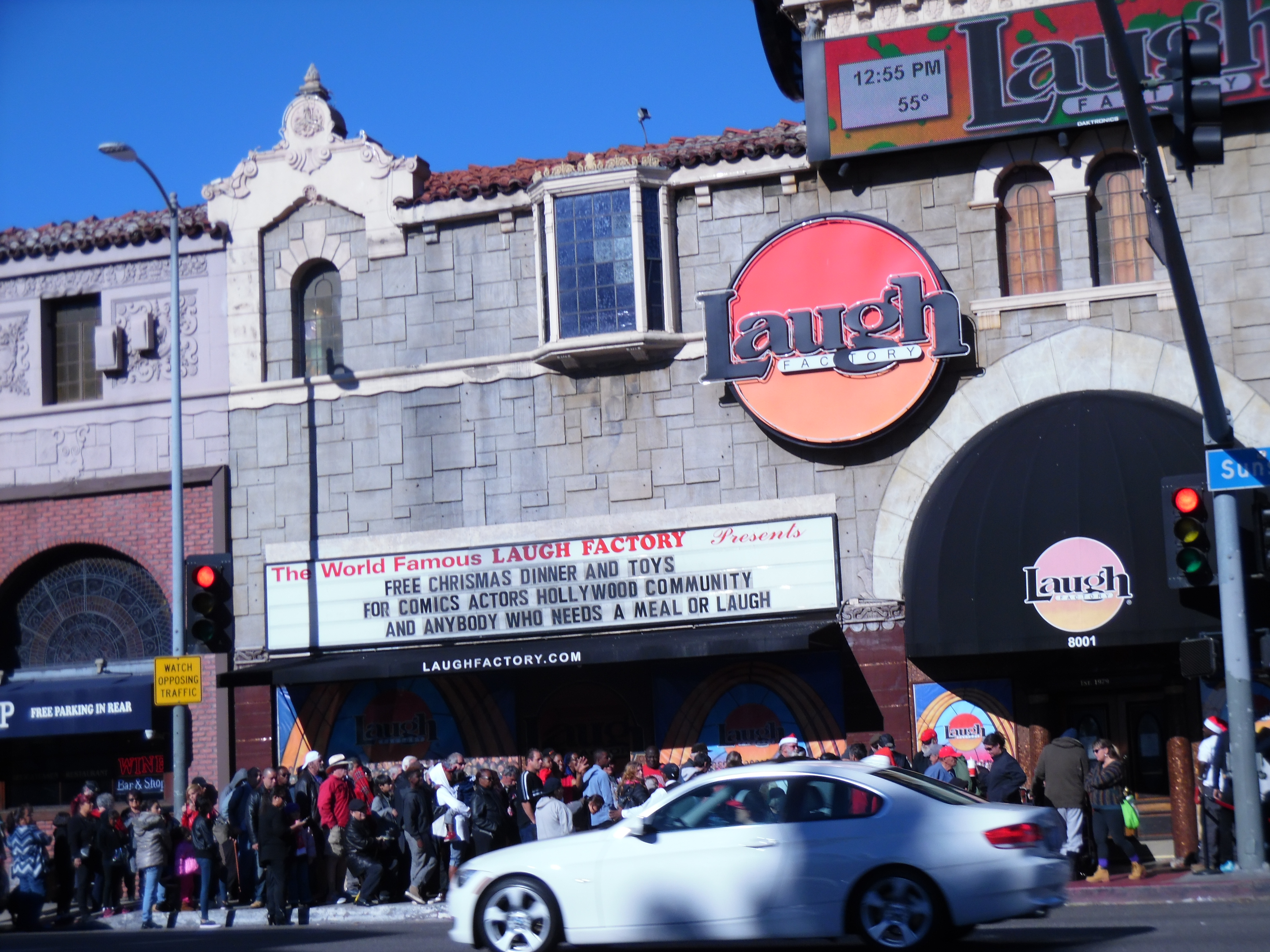
Marquee at the Laugh Factory

In an effort to support under-privileged children, Masada created the Laugh Factory's Comedy Camp for children in 1985. Through this camp, he has worked with over a thousand children, using comedy as a way to build their self confidence.

Since 1979, Masada has hosted free Thanksgiving and Christmas dinners at The Laugh Factory for the homeless, the poor, or anyone who doesn't want to be alone for the holidays, with over 5000 attending in 2008.

The Laugh Factory also hosts free services during the High Holy Days of Judaism.
