= Ian Harvie =

American comedian

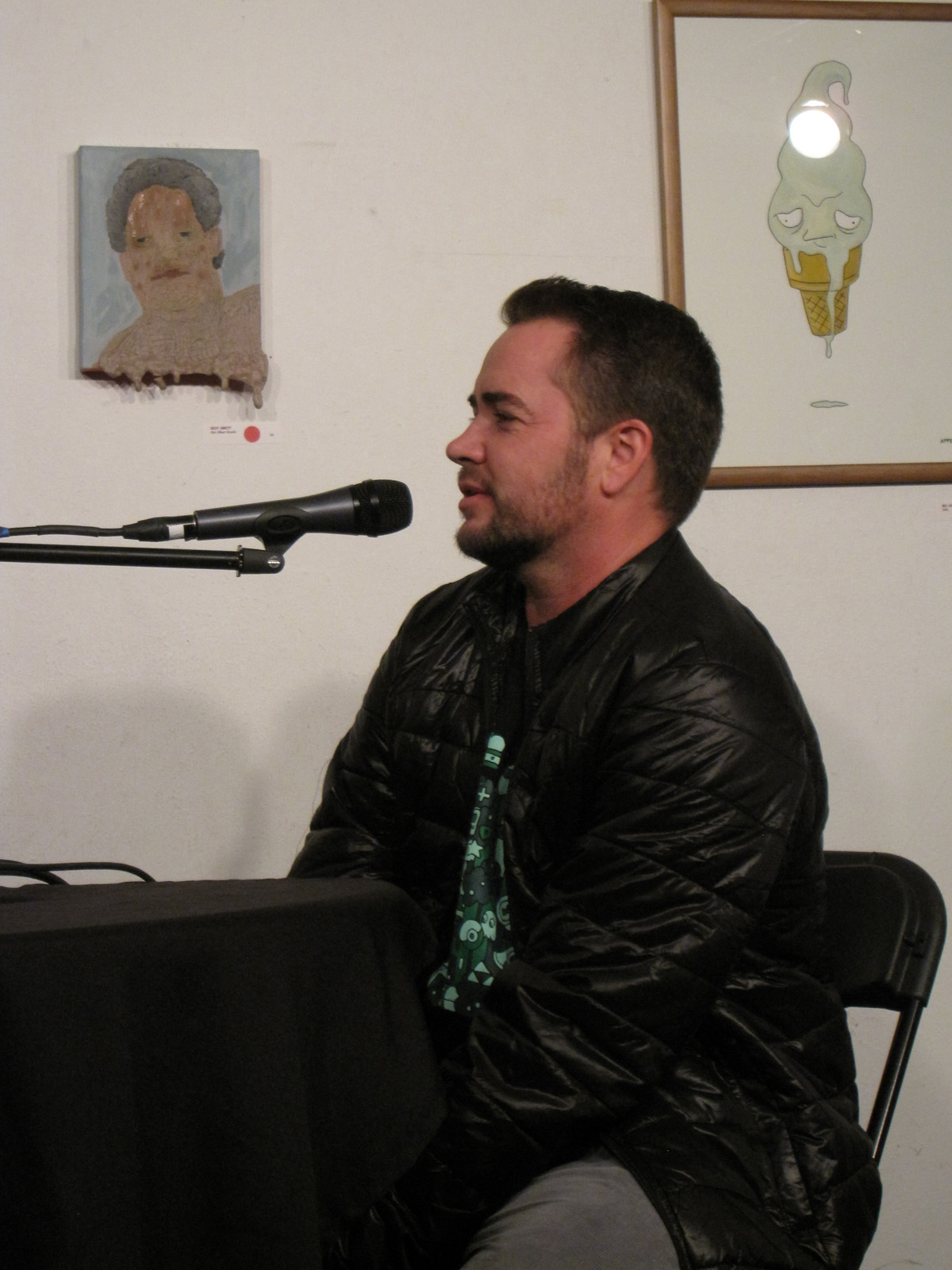
- Ian Harvie at The Dork Forest at Meltdown Comics, November 2011
- Occupation: Stand-up comedian
- Known for: Comedy
- Website: ianharvie.com

Ian Harvie is an American stand-up comedian and actor. He is a trans man and often references being one in his performances. He is best known for his appearance on the television show Transparent. In 2017, transgender actors and actresses including Harvie (with the help of GLAAD and ScreenCrush) were part of a filmed letter to Hollywood written by Jen Richards, asking for more and improved roles for transgender people.

Harvie was honored by EqualityMaine in 2016 for its Great Pioneer Award.

== Early life ==
Harvie grew up on Beaver Pond in the rural mountain town of Bridgton, Maine, until the age of twelve. He has two older brothers, Rob and Jeff. He went to Lassell College for one year and left. Harvie knew he was transgender at a very early age, but did not have a language for his gender identity at the time. Harvie came out as gay at nineteen and as transgender at age thirty-two. Early comedy influences he has cited include The Carol Burnett Show, Flip Wilson, Rich Little, Hee Haw, Laugh-In, Dean Martin Celebrity Roast, and Saturday Night Live.

== Comedy career ==
Harvie began his stand-up comedy career in January 2002 at a small comedy club in Portland, Maine. Three months later he began performing at a sister club in Boston, Massachusetts. Harvie moved to Los Angeles, California, in June 2006. By November 2006 he began touring with comedian Margaret Cho as her opening act. Cho cast Harvie as a permanent member of her off-Broadway burlesque comedy revue, Margaret Cho's The Sensuous Woman.

In April 2007, Harvie began producing and hosting his own self-titled comedy/talk show, The Ian Harvie Show, at Los Angeles music and comedy club Largo. The show is similar in format to other late-night talk shows but with guests who are all LGBT or connected to the LGBT community. Previous guests of the show include Margaret Cho, Leslie Jordan, Jane Lynch, Alan Cumming, Jorja Fox, Suzanne Westenhoefer, Kimberly Peirce, Rex Lee, Selene Luna, Jenny Shimizu, Buck Angel, Garrison Starr, Sabrina Matthews, and Erin Foley.

From October 2006 through October 2009, Harvie toured comedy clubs and theaters around the world with Margaret Cho. In 2007, he appeared on Logo as part of the Wisecrack Outlaugh Festival on Wisecrack. He performed on Logo again in 2009 on One Night Stand Up Episode 6 and on ABC's late night television series, Comics Unleashed with Byron Allen, in the 2009 season.

In November 2009, Harvie began his solo headlining career. His one-man show Parts Sold Separately, which features humor about sex and gender, played the Melbourne International Comedy Arts Festival in Melbourne, Australia, in April 2010. In January 2011, Harvie performed his new solo show Balls OUT with Ian Harvie at SF SketchFest in San Francisco, California.

In September 2010, Harvie and fellow sober comedians Felon O'Reilly and Amy Dresner began a three-person comedy group. They traveled around the US with their collective recovery-based standup comedy show, Laughs Without Liquor: the We Are Not Saints tour. The road show and tour were filmed by filmmaker and director Bobby R. Poirier with a planned release date of summer 2011.

In 2016, Harvie's special May The Best Cock Win was streamed on SeeSo.

== Filmography ==
- Curb Your Enthusiasm (2024) episode "Ken/Kendra" as Ken
- Young & Hungry (2016) as Uncle Chris
- Mistresses (American TV series) (2016) as Michael Hester
- Transparent (2014) episodes "The Symbolic Exemplar" and "The Wilderness" as Dale
- Roadtrip Nation (2014) episode "Know Who You Are" as himself
- Comics Unleashed (2014) June 3 episode as himself
- Ian Harvie Superhero (2013) as himself
- Sexing the Transman (2011) as himself
- Gaze (2010) as himself
- One Night Stand Up (2009) episode "Hollywood" as himself
- James Lipton Is Dead (2007) as God
- Wisecrack (2005) episode "Outlaugh Festival on Wisecrack: Episode 7" as himself
