= Civic Theatre (New Orleans) =

Theater in New Orleans, Louisiana

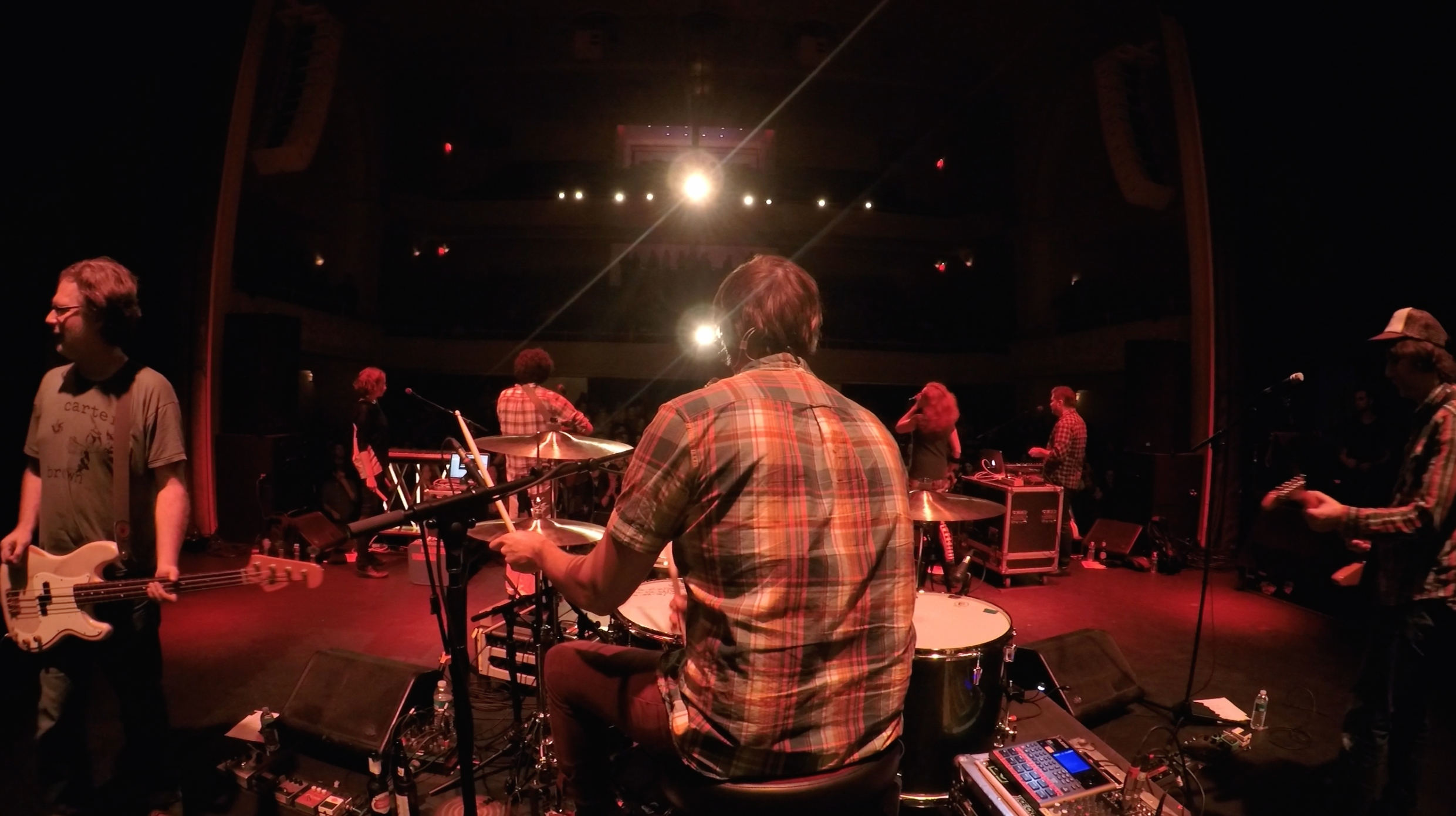
- Interactive map of Civic Theatre
- Address: 510 O’Keefe Avenue; New Orleans, Louisiana; USA
- Coordinates: 29.94953°N 90.07421°W
- Type: Performing arts
- Capacity: 1,200
- Current use: Performing arts venue

Construction
- Opened: 1906
- Closed: 1990s
- Reopened: 2013

Website
- Official website

The Civic Theatre is a 1,200-seat theater located in New Orleans, Louisiana. The theatre was originally built in 1906 and is used for concerts, plays, films, corporate events and private parties.

== History ==
The theater opened in 1906 as the Shubert Theatre and is the oldest performance theater in the city. It was built by The Shubert Organization which was credited with establishing New York's Broadway theater district. The theater was their first venue outside of New York and was used for plays, vaudeville, concerts, burlesque and film. During its history, Director Cecil B. Demille put on a production and performers such as Mae West performed at the theater. The venue changed names through the years and was also known as the Star, the Lafayette, the Poché and the Civic. It closed in the early 1990s.

In the early 2000s, real estate developer Brian Gibbs purchased the property and in 2011, Gibbs along with real estate developer Bryan Bailey developed a plan to put the theater back into use. After a $10 million renovation, the Civic reopened for performances in September 2013. It was rebuilt with an adaptable modular flooring system that can be raised or lowered.

== See also ==
- List of music venues
- Theatre in Louisiana
