= Fahim Anwar =

Fahim Anwar is an American stand-up comedian, actor, and writer of Afghan descent based in Los Angeles.

== Early life and education ==
Anwar is the son of Afghan immigrants. He grew up in the Seattle area and received a degree in mechanical engineering from the University of Washington. After graduation he moved to Long Beach, California, and worked as an aerospace engineer at Boeing while secretly performing stand-up comedy at night. He began performing at open mics at Seattle's Comedy Underground when he was 18.

== Career ==
Anwar was selected as one of the "New Faces" at the Just for Laughs festival in Montreal in 2010 and was a finalist in NBC's annual Stand-Up for Diversity Showcase. Early acting roles included a guest appearance on NBC's Chuck and MTV's Disaster Date. He performed stand-up on Conan, Late Night with Seth Meyers, and the Comedy Central special Russell Simmons Presents: Stand-Up From the El Rey Theatre.

His first one-hour special, Fahim Anwar: There's No Business Like Show Business, premiered on Seeso in 2017. Later specials include Hat Trick (2022), House Money (2024), and Intrusive Thoughts (2026). Film and television credits include Neighbors (2014), Whiskey Tango Foxtrot (2016), The Carmichael Show, Superior Donuts, Drunk History, and United States of Al (as both actor and writer).

Anwar is a member of the sketch-comedy group Goatface, which also includes Hasan Minhaj, Asif Ali, and Aristotle Athari. He served as head writer and starred in the group's Comedy Central special in 2018. In 2019 he was named one of Variety's 10 Comics to Watch. Following the release of his first special, The New York Times listed him as a "Most Promising Future Star." He has appeared as a guest on the Joe Rogan Experience and WTF with Marc Maron.

Anwar is a regular performer at The Comedy Store and other Los Angeles comedy clubs and continues to tour as a headliner.
