= Derek Sheen =

American stand-up comedian

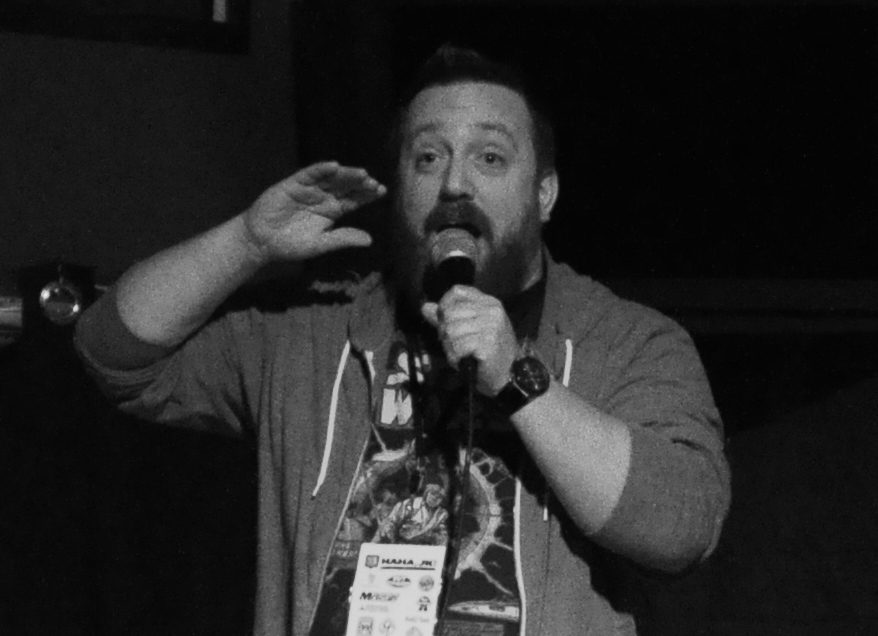
- Sheen performs at the 2011 Bridgetown Comedy Festival (Photo by Shawn Robbins)
- Born: 1969 or 1970 (age 55–56)
- Occupation: Stand-up comedian

Derek Sheen is a stand-up comedian from Seattle. He has released four albums on Stand Up! Records, most recently 2020's Macho Caballero.

Reviewer Richard Lanoie of The Serious Comedy Site said that Sheen "more than proves there are still some great, original, and intelligently dark comics out there." Daniel Berkowitz of website The Spit Take called Sheen "a hilarious and gifted performer" with "a unique voice that he's able to expertly harness." Drew Hunt of the Chicago Reader noted that Sheen's comedy can be "highly personal or emotionally transparent" and compared him to Brian Posehn for his "delivery and lucid, streetwise worldview."

== Career ==
Sheen wanted to be a comic from an early age. In third grade, he recited an entire George Carlin album side for show-and-tell. He first performed standup at nine, and at an open mic at 13. He played music professionally for 15 years before returning to standup at age 35. His comedy often touches on personal topics such as his depression and alcoholism.

Sheen tours frequently with Brian Posehn. He was a headliner at the Akumal Comedy Festival in Mexico. He appeared on the second season of the Seeso streaming series The Guest List in 2017. From 2011 to 2014, he co-hosted the podcast Delicious Mediocrity with fellow Seattle comic Douglas Gale.

His debut album Holy Drivel was recorded by producer Matt Bayles of Minus the Bear. Chris Spector of Midwest Record praised Sheen's "high energy attack that doesn't run out of steam."

Sheen's newest album, Macho Caballero, was released April 24, 2020, on Stand Up! Records, which reached No. 6 on the iTunes comedy chart, and No. 7 on Amazon's chart. Lanoie, reviewing Macho Caballero for Serious Comedy, called it "superb, consistently interesting and funny" and called his craftsmanship "so elegant it will make other comics jealous."

== Discography ==
- Holy Drivel (Rooftop Comedy, 2012; re-released on Stand Up! Records, 2017)
- Tiny Idiot (Stand Up! Records, 2016)
- Disasterbation (Stand Up! Records, 2017)
- Macho Caballero (Stand Up! Records, 2020)
