= Gothic Theatre =

Music venue and cinema in Englewood, Colorado, United States

- the Gothic
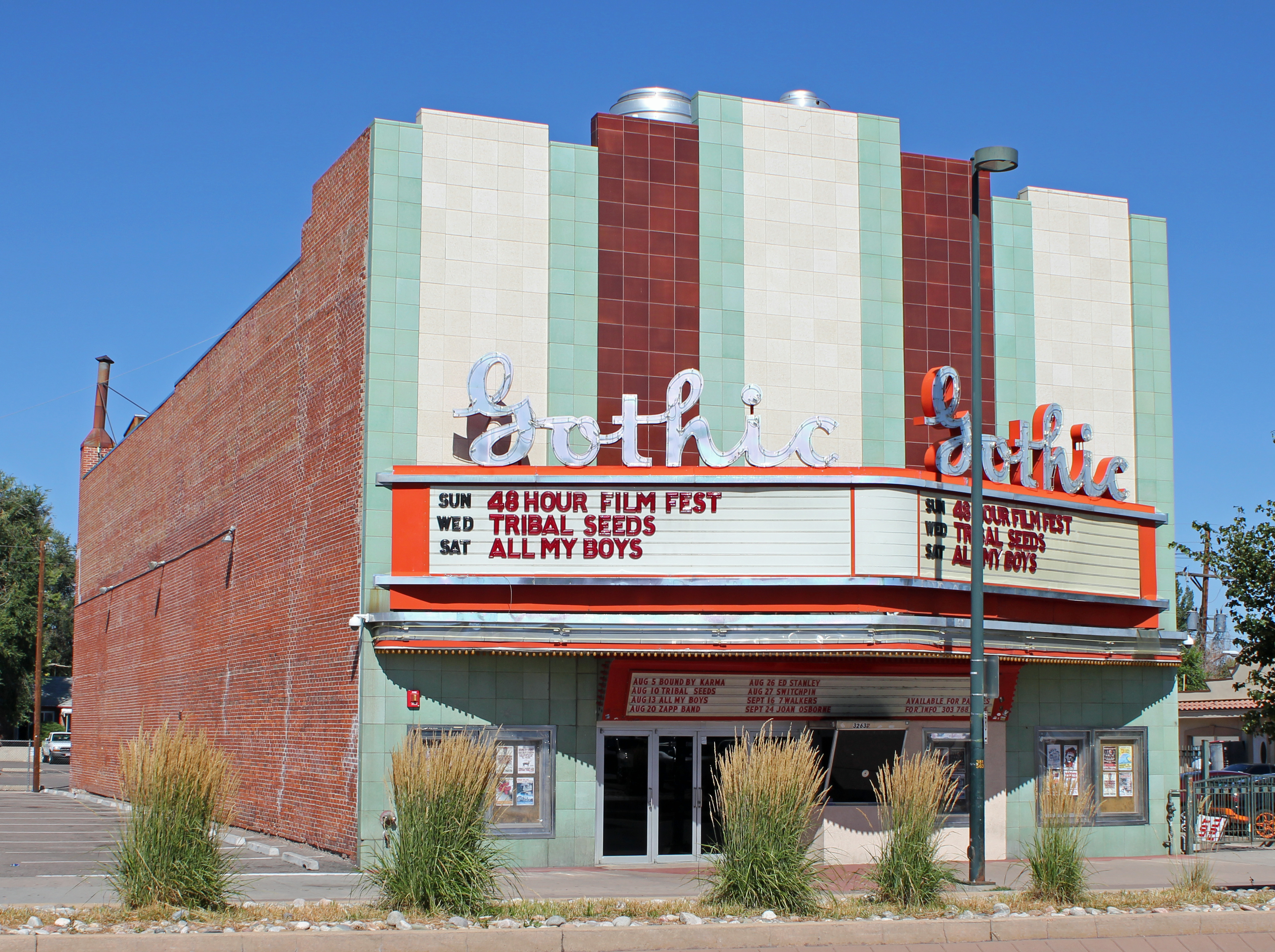
- Interactive map of Gothic Theatre
- Address: 3263 S Broadway; Englewood, CO 80113-2425
- Location: Denver Metro
- Coordinates: 39°39′28″N 104°59′17″W
- Owner: Owned by AEG Live
- Capacity: 1,100
- Type: Music venue

Construction
- Opened: 1925
- Renovated: 1945, 1998

Website
- www.gothictheatre.com

The Gothic Theatre is primarily a music venue in Englewood, Colorado. It was built in the 1920s as a movie theater, then revitalized in 1998. Since the theater re-opened in 1998, it has held many live events, ranging from local concerts to private events, and film showcases.

== History ==
The Gothic Theatre opened in 1925, as a movie theater, later becoming a concert venue. It was the first location in Denver to show talkies. The theater quickly became a popular entertainment destination among local society. The Gothic's distinguished art decor and architecture, including rounded walls and recessed inlets, are still present today, providing a historical backdrop to modern entertainment. In the 1940s, the Gothic experienced a change of ownership. As a result, the exterior was changed to conform to modern times. As time passed the Gothic had many different owners, each struggling to gain success with the theater, with the movie house eventually shuttered.

== Restoration ==
In 1998, two friends who had a passion for music restored the Gothic, surpassing its original design and entering the venue to the ranks of the most renowned theaters in Colorado. They bought the building out of bankruptcy, ultimately saving it from demolition. Deciding to keep the historical interior, they rebuilt the theater from the foundation to the roof.

Additionally, they hired designers and artists to help remodel certain aspects that fit into their vision. Now the theater has a fresh paint scheme, newly made wrap-around balcony, and a renovated marquee. People who have attended the theater have claimed that the Gothic is "probably the best local music venue in terms of light, size and sound". Another reviewed that it is "a relatively intimate concert venue". AEG Live began managing the venue in 2013.

== Notable shows ==
The Gothic has hosted many distinguished shows since its opening. Local bands, as well as nationally-recognized acts, are showcased. Nirvana chose the venue for one of the earliest public performances of "Smells Like Teen Spirit", June 10, 1991, prior to its release.

A few of the more noteworthy musicians and bands that have played at The Gothic are Slayer, Beastie Boys, Ministry, Thrill Kill Kult, KMFDM, Violent Femmes, Skinny Puppy, David Tipper, Phish, Death Cab for Cutie, BoomBox, Built To Spill, The Fray, Broken Bells, Dr. Dog, Pretty Lights, The Cranberries, All Time Low, Ingrid Michaelson, Lady Gaga, Pat Benatar, Three Six Mafia, Gavin Rossdale (of Bush), Cold War Kids, The Wallflowers, Rise Against, Blue Öyster Cult, The Black Keys, JoJo, King Crimson and The Cramps.

In addition to bands, the Gothic also showcases screenings of different films such as the Teton Gravity Research Ski/Snowboard movie premiere of The Tangerine Dream and 48 Hour Film Project. Comedy tours, such as Michael Ian Black's have also played at the Gothic. As a small, local venue, the Gothic is also consistently home to local battle of the bands shows.

== Production information ==
The Gothic is located on Englewood's historic South Broadway Street, and has a capacity of just less than 1000. It offers a full bar, a standing room only section as well as a seated section. All tickets, however, are sold as general admission. Included in the theater is a 20-foot retractable movie screen with a projector. The stage is 25 by 18 feet, with 19 feet of space from the stage to the lighting truss. While liquor sales are banned at all-ages concerts in the city of Denver, the Gothic is able to sell alcohol at all of its shows, due to its Englewood location.

== See also ==
- Fillmore Auditorium
- Paramount Theater
- Music of Denver
