= Doug Mellard =

American stand-up comedian (born 20th century

- Born: 20th century Victoria, Texas, U.S.
- Occupation: Stand-up comedian
- Years active: 2003-present
- Website: dougmellard.com

Doug Mellard (born 20th century) is an American stand-up comedian.

He is known for his appearances on Last Comic Standing, Live at Gotham, and his work with comedian Doug Benson.

The Austin American-Statesman has called Mellard "a high-energy crowd destroyer."

He has released three albums on Dan Schlissel's Stand Up! Records. The most recent, 2020's Fart Safari 3: Fart Hard with a Vengeance, reached number one on the iTunes comedy chart. Its predecessor, 2018's Fart Safari 2: Fart Harder, reached number three.

== Personal life ==
Mellard was born in Victoria, Texas, and raised in Plano. He is the second of three brothers.

He moved to Austin to attend the University of Texas at Austin. He moved to Los Angeles in 2010. He was married in 2018.

== Career ==
Mellard began performing stand-up in 2003 while in college. His comedy combines observational humor with surrealism, inspired by Mitch Hedberg and Steven Wright.

In 2006, Mellard won the 21st annual Funniest Person in Austin Contest at the Cap City Comedy Club.

In Austin, he was part of David Huntsberger's sketch-comedy troupe The Hooligan Show and the group 100 Proof Comedy.

Mellard appeared on season 4 of Last Comic Standing in 2006, reaching the televised semifinals. He also appeared on season 6.

He performed on Comedy Central's Live at Gotham in 2007. In 2009, he was featured on a "Laugh Squad With Bob and Ross" segment of The Jay Leno Show.

Mellard has performed at comedy festivals nationwide including Comedy Central's South Beach Comedy Festival, the Moontower Comedy Festival, and SXSW.

=== Podcasts and radio work ===
Mellard has hosted two podcasts. In August 2020, he and comedian Doug Benson launched Wide World of Dougs, in which they interview other people named Doug, or who have otherwise interesting names. In 2019, he launched 69th Base With Doug Mellard, a sports-themed comedy podcast, which ran for 44 episodes.

Mellard was also a co-host of the SiriusXM radio show Naked and Fearless.

=== Albums ===
Mellard has released three stand-up albums, 2015's Fart Safari, 2018's Fart Safari 2: Fart Harder, and 2020's Fart Safari 3: Fart Hard With a Vengeance.

Several critics noted that the seemingly crude title of the Fart Safari series belies Mellard's sophistication and skill as a comic: "Mellard is far from being a one-fart pony", wrote Lara Smith of Comedy Wham, who praised his "perfect and hilarious irreverence" and "vivid combination of observational humor and absurd fantastical 'what if' scenarios". Richard Lanoie of The Serious Comedy Site praised Mellard's "absurd, surrealistic take" on comedy.

== Discography ==
- Doug Mellard, Fart Safari (Stand Up! Records, 2015)
- Doug Mellard, Fart Safari 2: Fart Harder (Stand Up! Records, 2018)
- Doug Mellard, Fart Safari 3: Fart Hard with a Vengeance (Stand Up! Records, 2020)
