= Patton Oswalt filmography =

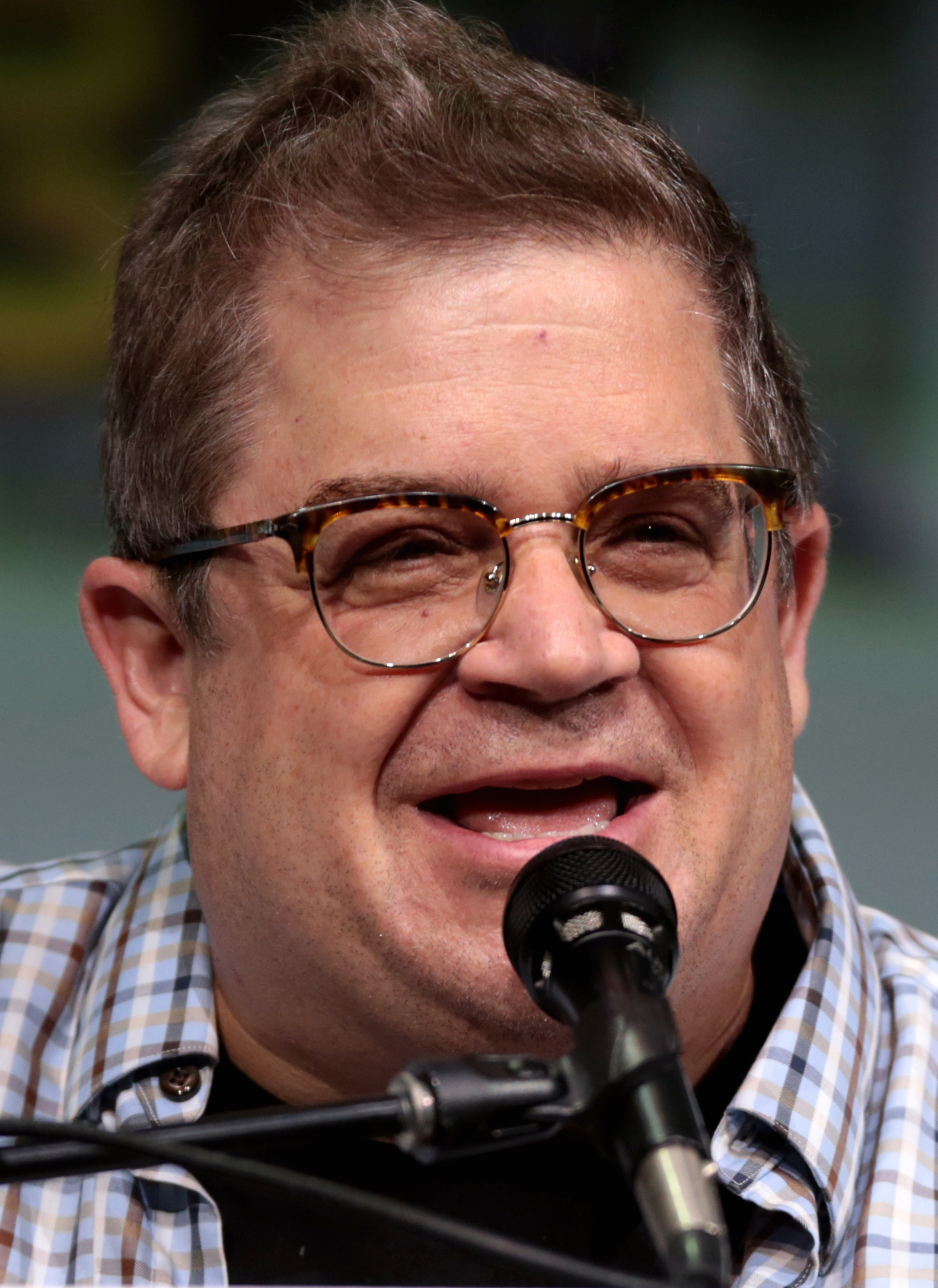
Oswalt in 2017

Patton Oswalt is an American stand-up comedian, actor and writer. He is primarily known for his work in comedy-related television and film, and voiceover.

== Film ==
Key
†	Denotes works that have not yet been released

Year	Title	Role	Notes
1990	Student Loans and You	A Comedian	Industrial film (paid $300)
1996	Down Periscope	Stingray Radioman (Film Debut)	
1999	Man on the Moon	Blue Collar Guy	
1999	Magnolia	Delmer Darion	
2000	Desperate But Not Serious	Auteur No. 1	
2001	Zoolander	Monkey Photographer	
2002	Zig Zag	Shelly	
2003	Run Ronnie Run	Dozer	
2003	Calendar Girls	Larry	
2004	Taxi	Clerk at Impound Office	
2004	Blade: Trinity	Hedges	
2004	Starsky and Hutch	Disco DJ	
2004	Dodgeball: A True Underdog Story	Video Store Clerk	Uncredited
2004	Rock Against Bush, Vol. 2	Himself	Direct-to-video
2004	See This Movie	Felix	
2005	The Comedians of Comedy	Himself	Documentary film; also executive producer
2005	Cake Boy	Cake Pervert	
2006	Failure to Launch	Techie Guy	
2007	Reno 911!: Miami	Jeff Spoder	
2007	Ratatouille	Remy	Voice
2007	Wrong Turn 2: Dead End	Tommy	Voice
2007	Balls of Fury	The Hammer	
2007	Sex and Death 101	Fred	
2007	Your Friend the Rat	Remy	Voice, short film
2008	Super High Me	Himself	Documentary film
2008	All Roads Lead Home	Milo	
2009	Observe and Report	Roger	
2009	Big Fan	Paul Aufiero	
2009	The Informant!	Ed Herbst	
2009	Al's Brain	Co-Worker	Short film
2010	Blood into Wine	Himself	Documentary film
2010	Beautiful Darling	Andy Warhol, Truman Capote	Voice, documentary film
2011	A Very Harold & Kumar 3D Christmas	Larry Juston	
2011	Young Adult	Matt Freehauf	
2012	Seeking a Friend for the End of the World	Roache	
2012	Nature Calls	Randy	
2013	Odd Thomas	Ozzie P. Boone	
2013	The Secret Life of Walter Mitty	Todd Maher	
2014	Jason Nash Is Married	Producer	
2014	22 Jump Street	MC State History Professor	Uncredited cameo
2014	Mune: Guardian of the Moon	Mox	Voice, English dub
2015	Dude Bro Party Massacre III	Chief	Also co-producer
2015	Old/New	Narrator	Voice, short film
2015	Freaks of Nature	Stuart Miller	
2015	The Loneliest Stoplight	Narrator	Voice, short film
2016	Donald Trump's The Art of the Deal: The Movie	Merv Griffin	
2016	Space Cop	Space Police Chief	
2016	Nerdland	Elliot	Voice
2016	The Confirmation	Drake	
2016	Keeping Up with the Joneses	Scorpion	
2017	The Circle	Tom Stenton	
2017	Please Stand By	Officer Frank	
2017	Gilbert	Himself	Documentary film
2018	Nostalgia	Peter	
2018	Sorry to Bother You	Mr. Blank's White Voice	Voice
2018	Unlovable	—N/a	Associate producer
2018	Teen Titans Go! To the Movies	Atom	Voice Cameo
2019	The Secret Life of Pets 2	Max	Voice, replacing Louis C.K.
2019	Super Gidget	Max	Voice, replacing Louis C.K.
2019	Dads	Himself	Documentary film
2020	We Bare Bears: The Movie	Nom Nom	Voice
2020	For Madmen Only: The Stories of Del Close	Lash LaRue	
2021	The Spine of Night	Lord Pyrantin	Voice
2021	Eternals	Pip the Troll	Voice, mid-credits scene
2021	Reno 911! The Hunt for QAnon	Ron Mackelberg	Direct-to-streaming
2022	I Love My Dad	Chuck	
2022	MEAD	M.E.A.D.	Voice
2022	Weird: The Al Yankovic Story	Biker Bar Heckler	
2023	80 for Brady	"Brisket"	
2023	Heroes of the Golden Mask	Aesop	Voice
2023	Unicorn Boy	King Uniturius	
2023	A Disturbance in the Force	Himself	Documentary film
2024	Ghostbusters: Frozen Empire	Dr. Hubert Wartzki	
2024	Sardinia	—N/a	Short film; executive producer
2024	Chain Reactions	Himself	Documentary film
2025	Absolute Dominion	Fix Huntley	
2025	Deathstalker	Doodad	Voice
2026	Buddy	Strappy	Voice
2026	Goat	Dennis	Voice
2026	The Dink	Skip	
2026	Ray Gunn	Hologram	Voice
2026	In a Holidaze		Completed

== Television ==
Key
†	Denotes works that have not yet been released

Year	Title	Role	Notes
1994	Seinfeld	Video Store Clerk	Episode: "The Couch"
1995–1997	MADtv	Crip in Wheelchair	1 episode; also writer
1996	NewsRadio	Gym Member	Episode: "The Trainer"
1996, 1998	Mr. Show with Bob and David	Famous Mortimer, Man in Restaurant, Blind Man on Balcony	2 episodes
1997	The Weird Al Show	Seymour	Episode: "Bad Influence"
1998	Dr. Katz, Professional Therapist	Patton	Voice, 2 episodes
1998	Pulp Comics: Margaret Cho	Various	Television special
1998–2007	The King of Queens	Spence Olchin	122 episodes
2000	Batman Beyond	Eldon Michaels	Voice, episode: "Sentries of the Last Cosmos"
2000	Super Nerds	Leslie	Pilot
2000–2004	Static Shock	Specs	Voice, 3 episodes
2002	The Man Show	Weepum Buzzkillus	Uncredited; episode: "Juggy Car Wash"
2002	Home Movies	Helmet	Voice, episode: "Renaissance"
2002–2003	Crank Yankers	Boomer	Voice, 4 episodes
2003–2006	Aqua Teen Hunger Force	DP, Skeeter, Jesus Ezekiel Jesus	Voice, 3 episodes
2003–2007	Kim Possible	Professor Dementor	Voice, 10 episodes
2004	The Fairly OddParents	Crimson Chin Writer	Episode: "The Big Superhero Wish"
2004	Tom Goes to the Mayor	Zynx	Voice, episode: "Pioneer Island"
2004–2020	Reno 911!	Various	12 episodes
2005	Cheap Seats: Without Ron Parker	Carter Bogie	Episode: "Kids Putt-Putt/Double Dutch"
2006	Clark and Michael	Realtor	1 episode
2006	Comedy Central Roast of William Shatner	Roaster	Television special
2006	Squidbillies	Shecky Chucklestein	Episode: "Survival of the Dumbest"
2006	The Amazing Screw-On Head	Mr. Groin	Voice, pilot
2006–2007	The Batman	Toymaker, Marty Slack	Voice, 2 episodes
2007	Human Giant	Various	3 episodes; also consultant writer
2007	SpongeBob SquarePants	Jim	Voice, episode: "The Original Fry Cook"; Mistakenly credited as "Patton Oswald"
2007	Comedy Central Roast of Flavor Flav	Roaster	Television special
2007	Reaper	Leon	Episode: "Leon"
2007–2008	Tim and Eric Awesome Show, Great Job!	Joshua Beard, Beaver Boys Doctor	3 episodes
2007–2021	American Dad!	Various voices	5 episodes
2007–2015	WordGirl	Tobey McCallister III, Robots	Voice, recurring role
2008	Lewis Black's Root of All Evil	Himself	6 episodes
2009	Flight of the Conchords	Elton John Impersonator	Episode: "Prime Minister"
2009	The Venture Bros.	Wonderboy	Voice, episode: "Self-Medication"
2009	Dollhouse	Joel Mynor	2 episodes
2009–2010	Community	Nurse Jackie	2 episodes
2009–2011	United States of Tara	Neil	21 episodes
2009–2011	Bored to Death	Howard Baker	4 episodes
2010	The Sarah Silverman Program	Vincent Van Guy	Episode: "A Good Van is Hard to Find"
2010	Neighbors from Hell	Pazuzu	Voice, 10 episodes
2010	Caprica	Baxter Sarno	6 episodes
2010	Glenn Martin, DDS	Volunteer Center Guy	Voice, episode: "Volunteers"
2010–2011	Robotomy	Thrasher	Voice, 10 episodes
2011	Futurama	Unattractive Giant Monster	Voice, episode: "Benderama"
2011	Jon Benjamin Has a Van	Steven Drears	Episode: "House on the Lake"
2011	Little Mosque on the Prairie	Florist with Tourette's Syndrome	Deleted scenes Episode: "An Arranged Marriage"
2011	Raising Hope	Rubin	Episode: "Bro-gurt"
2011–2014	The Heart, She Holler	Hurlan	28 episodes
2012	Bob's Burgers	Moody Foodie	Voice, episode: "Moody Foodie"
2012	Metalocalypse	Dr. Bartholomew Grahsrihajul, Klokateer	Voice, 2 episodes
2012	Burn Notice	Calvin Schmidt	3 episodes
2012–2013	Two and a Half Men	Billy Stanhope	5 episodes
2012, 2014	Comedy Bang! Bang!	Himself	2 episodes
2012, 2017	The Simpsons	T-Rex, Bart's Guilt	Voice, 2 episodes
2013	Portlandia	Thor83	2 episodes
2013	Parks and Recreation	Garth Blundin	Episode: "Article Two"
2013	Yo Gabba Gabba!	Patton the Caveman	Episode: "Dinosaur"
2013	Brooklyn Nine-Nine	Fire Marshall Boone	2 episodes
2013–2015	Axe Cop	Sockarang	Voice, 12 episodes
2013–2015	Justified	Constable Bob Sweeney	6 episodes
2013–2023	The Goldbergs	Adult Adam F. Goldberg	Voice, 121 episodes
2014	29th Independent Spirit Awards	Himself (host)	Television special
2014	Comedians in Cars Getting Coffee	Himself	Episode: "How Would You Kill Superman?"
2014	Mighty Med	Ed, The Exterminator	2 episodes
2014	Modern Family	Ducky	Episode: "Las Vegas"
2014	Gravity Falls	Franz	Voice, episode: "The Golf War"
2014–2017	Doc McStuffins	Count Clarence	Voice, 4 episodes
2014–2016	Drunk History	Various Roles	3 episodes
2014–2020	Agents of S.H.I.E.L.D.	The Koenigs	9 episodes
2014–2020	BoJack Horseman	Pinky Penguin, Various Voices	Voice, 14 episodes
2015	Battle Creek	Mayor Hardy	Episode: "Cereal Killer"
2015	Maron	Himself	Episode: "Anti-Depressed"
2015	Rick and Morty	Beta Seven	Voice, episode: "Auto Erotic Assimilation"
2015	The Adventures of Puss in Boots	Francisco	Voice, episode: "Luck"
2015–2018	Pickle and Peanut	Papa	4 episodes
2015–2019	Veep	Teddy Sykes	11 episodes
2015–2019	We Bare Bears	Nom Nom	Voice, recurring role
2016	Archer	Alan Shapiro	Voice, 6 episodes
2016	Inside Amy Schumer	AMZ Host	Episode: "Madame President"
2016	Lady Dynamite	Himself	3 episodes
2016	TripTank	Pegasus	Voice, episode: "Crime Scene Investigation"
2016	The Tom and Jerry Show	Carver	Voice, episode: "Return to Sender"
2016	Bajillion Dollar Propertie$	Derek Young	Episode: "Baxter's Confession"
2016	Full Frontal with Samantha Bee	Himself	Television special
2016, 2019	My Little Pony: Friendship Is Magic	Quibble Pants	Voice, 2 episodes
2016–2019	Those Who Can't	Gil Nash	4 episodes
2016–2017	Miles from Tomorrowland	Hubie	Voice, 2 episodes
2017	Zoolander: Super Model	Dr. Botoxo	Voice, television film
2017	Santa Clarita Diet	Dr. Charles Hasmedi	Episode: "We Can't Kill People!"
2017	69th Writers Guild of America Awards	Himself (host)	Television special
2017	Dimension 404	Uncle Dusty	Episode: "Cinethrax"
2017	Difficult People	Kenny Jurgens	Episode: "Fuzz Buddies"
2017	HarmonQuest	Sandpole	Episode: "Back to Sandman Desert"
2017	Click, Clack, Moo: Christmas at the Farm	Appliance Al	Voice
2017–2018	Crazy Ex-Girlfriend	J. Castleman	2 episodes
2017–2018	Justice League Action	Space Cabbie	Voice, recurring role (8 episodes)
2017–2022	Mystery Science Theater 3000	Max (TV's Son of TV's Frank) / Friar Nolte	33 episodes
2017–2019	Happy!	Happy	Voice, main role
2017–2020	Mickey and the Roadster Racers	Maynard McSnorter	Voice, 9 episodes
2017–2020	Spider-Man	Uncle Ben, Chameleon	Voice, recurring role
2018	Robot Chicken	Brock, Doug Funnie, Flamingo	Voice, episode: "Strummy Strummy Sad Sad"
2018	Another Period	Interviewer	Episode: "Sex Nickelodeon"
2018	Spy Kids: Mission Critical	Mint Condition	Voice, episode: "The Vinyl Countdown"
2018	Pig Goat Banana Cricket	Jimmy Ron Cricket	Voice, episode: "Jimmy Ron Cricket"
2018	Niko and the Sword of Light	The Prince of Whale	Voice, episode: "Sky Whale City"
2018–2021	Big Hero 6: The Series	Mr. Frank Sparkles	Voice, recurring role
2018–2021	A.P. Bio	Principal Ralph Durbin	Main role
2019	Schooled	Adult Adam	Voice, episode: "Be Like Mike"
2019	Kim Possible	Professor Dementor	Television film
2019	An Emmy for Megan	Himself	6 episodes
2019	Veronica Mars	Penn Epner	8 episodes
2019	Teen Titans Go!	Atom	Voice, episode: "Strength of a Grown Man"
2019–2020	Will & Grace	Danley Walker	3 episodes
2020	DreamWorks Dragons: Rescue Riders	Oscar	Voice, episode: "King Burple"
2020	Home Movie: The Princess Bride	Vizzini	Episode: "Chapter Four: Battle of the Wits"
2020	Mapleworth Murders	Jerry Sprinks	5 episodes
2020	The Boys	Deep's Gills	Voice, episode: "Proper Preparation and Planning"
2021	Bless the Harts	Vohnnie Ray Power	Voice, episode: "Crappy Death Day"
2021	Teenage Euthanasia		Voice, episode: "Adventures in Beetle Sitting"
2021	Curb Your Enthusiasm	Harry Baskin	Episode: "The Mini Bar"
2021	Santa Inc.	Peter Rabbit (voice)	Episode: "Spring Awakening"
2021	M.O.D.O.K.	George Tarleton / M.O.D.O.K.	Voice, main role; also writer
2021–2022	The Conners	Don Blansky	3 episodes
2021–2024	The Ghost and Molly McGee	Mayor Brunson	Voice, 9 episodes
2021–2025	Family Guy	Tyler / Bear Show Manager	Voice, 4 episodes
2022	Space Force	Captain Lancaster	2 episodes
2022	Star Trek: Picard	Spot 73	Voice, episode: "Penance"
2022	Gaslit	Charles Colson	3 episodes
2022	The Boys	Himself	Episode: "Herogasm"; cameo
2022	Big City Greens	Mr. Fluffenfold	Voice, episode: "DependaBill/The Delivernator"
2022	Inside Job	TSA Guard	Voice, episode: "We Found Love in a Popeless Place"
2022–2023	StoryBots: Answer Time	Mr. Super Snowy Icy Cone Guy	3 episodes
2022–2025	The Sandman	Matthew the Raven	Voice, 15 episodes
2023	Firebuds	Duke The Duck Bus	Voice, episode: "Shelter Island/Escape from Shelter Island"
2023	Celebrity Jeopardy!	Himself	3 episodes
2023	What We Do in the Shadows	Himself	Episode: "Exit Interview"; cameo
2023	Shatter Belt	Dervey Ryan	Episode: "The Specimen"
2024	Grimsburg	Stinky	Voice, 2 episodes
2024	Manhunt	Lafayette Baker	Main role
2024	Adventures in Wonder Park	Steve	Voice, main role; 11 episodes
2024	Hacks	Himself	Episode: "The Roast of Deborah Vance"
2024	The 1% Club	Host	United States version
2024	John Mulaney Presents: Everybody's in LA	Himself	Episode: "Helicopters"
2025	Suits LA	Himself	2 episodes
2025	Super Duper Bunny League	Lizard Lips	Voice, 2 episodes
2025	Star Trek: Strange New Worlds	Doug	Episode: "Four-and-a-Half Vulcans"
2025	The Abandons	Mayor Victor Nibley	Recurring role
2025–2026	The Bad Guys: The Series	Mr. Wigglesworth	Voice, 2 episodes
2026	Strip Law		Voice, episode: "I Was a Teenage Lawbert"
2026	Among Us	White	Voice, 2 episodes
TBA	The Forever House †		

=== Stand-up comedy specials ===
Year	Title	Distributor
1997	HBO Comedy Half-Hour	HBO
1999	Comedy Central Presents	Comedy Central
2006	Patton Oswalt: No Reason to Complain	Comedy Central
2009	Patton Oswalt: My Weakness Is Strong	Comedy Central
2011	Patton Oswalt: Finest Hour	Comedy Central
2014	Patton Oswalt: Tragedy Plus Comedy Equals Time	Comedy Central; Epix
2016	Patton Oswalt: Talking for Clapping	Netflix
2017	Patton Oswalt: Annihilation	Netflix
2020	Patton Oswalt: I Love Everything	Netflix
2022	Patton Oswalt: We All Scream	Netflix
2026	Patton Oswalt: Tea & Scotch	YouTube

== Video games ==
Year	Title	Role	Notes
1997	The X-Fools	—N/a	Writer
2004	Grand Theft Auto: San Andreas	Radio Station Caller	Uncredited
2005	Grand Theft Auto: Liberty City Stories	Radio Caller	
2006	Grand Theft Auto: Vice City Stories	New World Order Caller; Reporter	
2006	Kim Possible: What's the Switch?	Professor Dementor	
2007	Ratatouille	Remy	
2007	Aqua Teen Hunger Force Zombie Ninja Pro-Am	DP, Skeeter	
2012	Rush: A Disney-Pixar Adventure	Remy	
2015–2017	Minecraft: Story Mode	Jesse	
2017	Ghostbusters VR: Now Hiring	Mooglie	Mobile game
2022	Disney Dreamlight Valley	Remy	

== Music videos ==
Year	Title	Artist
2001	"Another Perfect Day"	American Hi-Fi
2011	"Excuse"	The Ettes
2013	"The Magic Clap"	The Coup
2014	"Foil"	"Weird Al" Yankovic
2015	"Will You Dance?"	The Bird and the Bee
2016	"I Love the USA"	Weezer
2020	"Eat It (We're All In This Together)"	David Cross featuring "Weird Al" Yankovic
2021	"My Sweet Lord"	George Harrison

== Web series ==
Year	Title	Role	Notes
2019	Red Letter Media	Himself	Episode: "Best of the Worst: Plinketto #8"
2020	Honest Trailers	Himself	Voice, episode:"2020"
2022	The Glue Factory	Daddy James	Voice

== Theme park attractions ==
Year	Title	Role
2014	Remy's Ratatouille Adventure	Remy
2016	The Lego Movie: 4D – A New Adventure	Risky Business
2021	The Secret Life of Pets: Off the Leash	Max

== Podcast ==
Year	Title	Role	Notes
2023	Who is No/One?	Teddy Barstow	
2024	Valley Heat	Lawrence Janthony	
