= Boccara =

Boccara is a surname. Notable people with this surname include:

- Frida Boccara (1940–1996), French singer
- Ilan Boccara (born 1993), former professional footballer
- Jean-Pierre Boccara, French-Italian-American entrepreneur
- Philippe Boccara (born 1959) French-American sprint kayaker
