= 222 (disambiguation) =

222 was a year of the Julian calendar, in the third century AD.

222 also commonly refers to:

- 222 (number), the natural number following 221 and preceding 223

222 may also refer to:

== Entertainment ==
=== Music ===
- 222 (album), a 2023 album by Lil Tjay
- 222 (Live & Uncut), a version of Patton Oswalt's comedy album Feelin' Kinda Patton
- 222 (EP), María Becerra, 2019
- "222" (song), from the 2007 Paul McCartney album Memory Almost Full
- 222 Records, an American record label founded in 2012 by Adam Levine
- The 222s, a Montreal band
- "222", a song by Flatbush Zombies on the 2013 EP BetterOffDead

=== Television ===
- Room 222, a television show
- "222" (Squid Game), a television episode

== Transportation and vehicles ==
- British Rail Class 222, a class of trains used in Great Britain
- A222 road, a road between Bexley and Croydon, UK
- Route 222 (MBTA), a bus route in Massachusetts, US
- Bell 222, an American twin-engine light helicopter
- Sd.Kfz. 222, a World War II German reconnaissance vehicle
- 2-2-2, a classification of steam locomotive
- U.S. Route 222, a road in the U.S. states of Maryland and Pennsylvania
- A bus route in London from Hounslow to Uxbridge
- Maserati 222, a coupé

== Weapons ==
- 130 mm coastal defense gun A-222
- A-222 Bereg, a Russian self-propelled 130 mm coastal defence gun
- .222 Remington and .222 Remington Magnum, firearm cartridges

== Other ==
- 2:22 (disambiguation)
- 222, a formulation of the compound analgesic co-codaprin
- 222 Lucia, an asteroid
