= Sandra Binion =

American artist

- Born: Chicago, IL
- Education: University of Cincinnati (BFA); School of the Art Institute of Chicago (MFA)
- Known for: Performance art, multimedia installations, photography, painting
- Notable work: Distillé; Seasons; Dark Water; Ennesbo
- Awards: Performing Arts Chicago's Excellence in Visual Exhibition Award (2004–2005); Walter and Karla Goldschmidt Foundation Grant (2014–2022)
- Website: sandrabinion.com

Sandra Binion is a Swedish-American artist based in Chicago whose artistic practice includes fine-art exhibitions, multimedia installations involving, and performance art. Her work has been performed and exhibited at museums, galleries, theaters, and festivals in the US, Europe, and Japan. Some of the venues that have featured her work include the Evanston Art Center, Link's Hall, Kunstraum (Stuttgart), The Goodman Theatre, and Los Angeles Institute of Contemporary Art.

== History ==
Her early performance art, begun in the mid-1970s is frequently affiliated with Fluxus performances. After graduating with a BFA in dance from University of Cincinnati – College-Conservatory of Music in 1975, she performed in Charlotte Moorman's Annual Avant-Garde Art Festival in 1974, 1975, and 1978. Egyptian Frieze Walk was performed in the Festival's 15th iteration in Cambridge, MA. Documentation of these performances was included in Block Museum of Art's Feast of Astonishments: Charlotte Moorman and the Avant-Garde, 1960s-1980s. Her early performances of the 1970s, often challenge the separation between art and life, elevating mundane activities like ironing clothes, scrubbing steps, dining and doing laundry, and incorporating them into art performances. Her live performances often incorporate live sound performances; She has collaborated with sound artists and musicians such as Lou Mallozzi, Michael Zerang, and Tatsu Aoki.

Since the early 1980s, she has also created installation art. In 1992, she earned a MFA in Filmmaking from the School of the Art Institute of Chicago. Her installations range from single-channel video installations to entire multi-channel video architectural facades (such as "Seasons" installed at the Hyde Park Arts Center in 2007), Her work often expands to incorporate media such as sound, photography, and even scents, as seen in her 2016 installation Distille..

Her recent exhibitions have emphasized her work in photography and painting, which she has been involved in throughout her career. Her early photographic-collaborations include work with Dirk Bakker. Many of her artworks make reference to literary works, including readings from novels by Marguerite Duras, and most recently Gustave Flaubert's Madame Bovary.

As an arts organizer she has curated exhibitions at Experimental Sound Studio in Chicago since 2007. In 2010 she began the 70+ Visual Artist Oral Archive project with Linda L Kramer, which documents contributions and achievements of Chicago artists aged 70 and above. The archives will be stored at the Ryerson and Burnham Libraries at the Art Institute of Chicago.

== Exhibitions ==
- 2022 the beauty of something ripped, solo exhibition. Alliance Française de Chicago
- 2021 Aftermath, series of watercolors. Durant Art Institute, Lake Forest College, IL
- 2021 Searching for Emma, photographic series. Centre d’art contemporain de la Matmut – Daniel Havis, Saint-Pierre-de-Varengeville, France
- 2017 Distillé Preambule: Une sélection de photographies, photographs in dialogue with 18th sketches by Albert Fourié. Porte 10 – Espace culturel du CHU-Hopitaux de Rouen, Rouen, France (curated by Sylvain Amic), as Part of "La Ronde," 9 Musées de la Métropole.
- 2017-2014 Distillé, a selection of photographs, solo exhibition. University Club of Chicago; Palais Jacques Coeur, Bourges, France
- 2013 StreamLines: ephemeral presence in contemporary art, (group exhibition curated by Lise McKean). 13th Sakyadhita International Conference on Buddhist Women in Vaishali, Bihar, India
- 2011 Dialoghi Imprevisti, solo exhibition of watercolor works (2011–2012). Montevarchi Arte Festival; Palazzo Costa, Mantova, Italy (curated by Lucio Pozzi for MAT/tam)
- 2009 Northern (L)attitudes (group exhibition). Scandinavia House, NYC
- 1995 No Moon, a photographic portfolio in collaboration with Dirk Bakker. The Fassbender Gallery, Chicago; The Exhibition Meta/Physics: Crossing Boundaries In Contemporary Photography (group exhibition curated by Steve Nelson), Hope College, Holland, Michigan
- 1983 Mixed Grill(group exhibition curated by Jean Dupuy). Grommet Gallery, New York City
- 1983 The Green Dress, A Chicago Story, a photo collaboration with Dirk Bakker. Artemisia Gallery, Chicago; The Goodman Theatre, Chicago; Powerhouse Gallery, Montreal

== Multimedia installations ==
- 2021 Fleeting, multi-media installation. Durant Art Institute, Lake Forest College, IL
- 2021-2016 Distillé, video, sound, photographs, scents, and objects. Centre d’art contemporain de la Matmut – Daniel Havis, Saint-Pierre-de-Varengeville, France; Kyoto City University of the Arts Art Museum, Kyoto, Japan; Maison de George Sand, Nohant, France; Abbaye de Noirlac – Centre culturel de rencontre, Bruère-Allichamps, France
- 2017 Dark Water, video, photography, painting, and sculpture (bronze and marble). Passaggi Art Contemporanea (curated by Silvana Vassallo), Pisa, Italy
- 2014 Round Trip, diptych-video installation. Dallas Biennial (DB14), Dallas, Texas. Pae/saggio group exhibit, Montevarchi, Italy, curated by Carles Marco.
- 2014 Random Lines In Tereglio, 40-foot wall installation, with 35 paintings. The Art of Description (group exhibition curated by Douglas Stapleton), Illinois State Museum, Chicago Gallery
- 2013 Waiting For Small Mysteries, single-channel video installation. ACQUA (group exhibition curated by Carles Marco), Associazione Montevarchi Arte, Montevarchi, Italy
- 2012 Diminuendo, sound installation. Home: Public or Private? (group exhibition curated by Tricia van Eck), 6018NORTH, Chicago; La Fagiana, Tereglio, Italy.
- 2012-2011 Vino, four-channel video installation. Experimental Sound Studio, Chicago; Il Borgo degli Agrumi festival, Buggiano Castello, Italy
- 2012 Rough Beauty, multi-media installation with paintings, photographs. La Fagiana, Tereglio, Italy
- 2012 LUMACA, video installation (2012-2013). La Fagiana, Tereglio, Italy; The Art of Description (group exhibition curated by Douglas Stapleton), Illinois State Museum, Chicago Gallery; Subtropics Festival of Experimental Music (curated by Gustavo Matamoros), Miami, Florida .
- 2011 Botanica, multi-media installation with paintings, photographs. Il Borgo degli Agrumi festival, Buggiano Castello, Italy
- 2008-10 Ennesbo, multi-media installation with four-channel video. House of Sweden (Washington, DC), Swedish American Museum Center, Chicago; American Swedish Historical Museum, Philadelphia; Nordic Heritage Museum, Seattle; Hillstrom Museum of Art, Gustavus Adolphus College, St. Peter, Minnesota
- 2007 Seasons, five-channel video-façade installation. Hyde Park Art Center, Chicago
- 2006 Samba Corporal, multi-media installation. (group exhibition curated by Corey Postiglione), A + D Gallery, Columbia College, Chicago; Koehnline Museum of Art, Oakton Community College, Des Plaines, IL
- 2005 Mirage, multi-media installation. Evanston Art Center, Evanston, Illinois; PAC/edge Performance Festival, Athenaeum Theatre, Chicago; Tarble Art Center, Eastern Illinois University, Charleston, IL
- 2004 watercloset(s), diptych-video installation (2004-2005). PAC/edge Performance Festival, Athenaeum Theatre, Chicago; LIPA Gallery; NOVA Young Art Fair, Chicago
- 2003 Bianco Veneziano, video installation. Pac/Edge Performance Festival, Chicago; Noyes Cultural Art Center, Evanston, Illinois
- 2002 Hollywood Blvd, video. Subtropics Festival Of Experimental Music, Miami, Florida, and The Outer Ear Festival Of Sound, Gene Siskel Film Center, Chicago.
- 2002 Only Sleeping, video installation (2002-2003). Stone Chapel At Fourth Presbyterian Church, Chicago; Center For Peace And Human Security Media Festival, New York; And Lipa Gallery, Chicago; "Summer Summit," Poetovio, Slovenia
- 1996 Frame Of Reference, solo exhibition of 16mm film-based photographs and video installation. Space Gallery, Western Michigan University, Kalamazoo
- 1982 Silver Square, installation. Randolph Street Gallery, Chicago

== Performances ==
- 2003 Thirteen Nights, in collaboration with Lou Mallozzi: Pac/Edge Performance Festival, Athenaeum Theatre, Chicago and The Rhinoceros Theater Festival, Chicago.
- 2001 First/Last Performance For Reader, projected video, page-turner, and musician (1999-2001). With Leroy Jenkins on violin: Woodland Pattern, Milwaukee, The Candlestick Maker, Chicago. With Filippo Monico on percussion: Galerie Nuova Icona at The Oratorio San Ludovico, Venice, Italy. With Janice Misurell-Mitchell on flute: No Exit, Sunday Contemporary Music Series. With Michael Zerang on percussion: Gallery 2
- 1998 Duras Piece, for reader, musician, projected video and sleeper. With Matt Ingalls On Clarinet: Studio For, Oakland, California and Hans Fahden Vineyards, Calistoga, California. With Vincent Chancey on French horn: Fassbender Gallery and Hothouse, Chicago. With Spencer Barefield on guitar: Studio D(Etroit)
- 1997 Scrubbing The Floors, a meditation of the art of maintenance for scrubwoman, video and string quartet (1996–97), Western Michigan University, Kalamazoo; University Of California, Berkeley; Studio For, Oakland; Venue 9, San Francisco
- 1990 Mmedeaa, a chamber opera with fire installation, with Jim O’Rourke and Angelika Hoffman: Mcnulty Bros. Factory, Chicago
- 1990 La (Vera) Dolce Vita Per Televisione E Pasta, with Douglas Grew: Club Lower Links, Chicago,
- 1989 Opera Barcelona, for cello, saxophone, laundress and video, with Fareed Haque, Naomi Millender And Ari Brown: Link's Hall, Chicago
- 1987 Could Have Just Thrown The Ball..., for silhouette figure, film and musician, Link's Hall, Chicago; Kunstlerinnen-Symposiums '87 At The Kunstraum, Stuttgart, Germany.
- 1985 The Result Of The Search For Something Simple And Uncomplicated, for four characters and film, Institut Unzeit, Berlin, Germany; With Lawrence "Butch" Morris on Cornet: Link's Hall, Chicago
- 1984 Dada Race, a turtle-race event with Jim Guzetta on accordion and The Rova Saxophone Quartet, International Dada Festival At Club Generic, San Francisco
- 1984 Steam Symphony, sound performance for twenty ironers, Miami Waves Experimental Film And Video Forum, Miami, FL
- 1983 Figure, Painting, The Storefront, San Francisco; and with Lawrence "Butch" Morris on cornet at The Storefront For Art And Architecture, New York City
- 1983 Suite For Bass And Ironing Bored, for ironer, contrabass and video (1981–84). With Tyler Mitchell: Art Expo, Navy Pier, Chicago; With Harrison Bankhead: Randolph Street Gallery, Chicago; Powerhouse Gallery, Montreal; and Spaces, Cleveland. With Jaribu Shahid: Detroit Artists Market, and C.A.G.E., Cincinnati; With Thomas Stabenow: Kunstraum, Stuttgart. With Mel Graves: Lamamelle, San Francisco; With Bert Turetzky: Lhasa Club, Hollywood, and Sushi, San Diego. With Arzinia Richardson: Miami Waves Forum, Miami. With Brian Smith: Manhattan Healing Arts Center, NY
- 1982 Negative Act, Randolph Street Gallery, Chicago And At The Franklin Furnace, New York City
- 1982 Red, Red, All Red, 6-day performance, Stanley Korshak's Storefront, North Michigan Avenue, Chicago
- 1980 Clock:Watch, 24-hour performance, First Los Angeles Performance Festival, Los Angeles, CA
- 1978 Homage A Odilon Redon, The Los Angeles Institute Of Contemporary Art, CA
- 1978 All Tied Up, The Mudd Club, New York City
- 1978 Egyptian Frieze Walk, 15th Annual Avant Garde Art Festival (curated by Charlotte Moorman), Cambridge, MA

== Awards ==
- Walter and Karla Goldschmidt Foundation, 2014–2022
- DEW Foundation, 2013–2022
- Illinois Arts Council Project Completion, 1980–2014
- Reale Mutua Assicurazioni, 2011
- Pro Suecia Foundation, 2007–2010
- American Scandinavian Foundation, 2007
- Swedish Women's Educational Association Chicago, 2007
- Performing Arts Chicago's Excellence in Visual Exhibition Award, 2004–2005
- Hugh M. Hefner Foundation, 2004–2005
- Richard H. Driehaus Foundation, 2003
- Goethe-Institute, 1990
- Art Matters Foundation, 1990

== Collections ==
Public collections that hold works by Sandra Binion include: University Art Museum of Kyoto City University of Arts (Japan), Bibliothèque patrimoniale Villon (Rouen, France), Musée Flaubert (Rouen, France), Museo della Grafica di Pisa (Italy), The Art Institute of Chicago, Chicago History Museum, Detroit Institute of Arts, Museum of Fine Arts Houston, International Center of Photography (New York), Monasterio de San Lazzaro degli Armeni (Venice, Italy), Museum of Modern Art (New York). Binion also has works in private collections in India, France, Italy, Germany, Switzerland, Japan, and the United States.
