= My Weakness Is Strong =

Live album by Patton Oswalt
- Released: August 25, 2009
- Recorded: February 2009
- Genre: Comedy
- Label: Warner Bros. Records; 49781

Patton Oswalt chronology
Frankensteins and Gumdrops (2008)	My Weakness Is Strong (2009)	Finest Hour (2011)

DVD cover
- The DVD cover of My Weakness Is Strong.

My Weakness Is Strong is the third comedy album by Patton Oswalt, following the 2007 release Werewolves and Lollipops.

== Track listing ==
=== Disc 1 ===
1. Text
2. Birth
3. Fat
4. Treadmill
5. Whiskey and Weed and L.S.D.
6. The Sad Boy
7. The Oswalt Family Crest
8. Rats
9. Orgy
10. Lofty Thoughts
11. First
12. Obama... and Time Travel... and Coolness... and the Last Racist
13. Demons
14. Sky Cake
15. Grocery Robots
16. Airplane
17. The Magician

=== Disc 2 (DVD) ===
1. Hello, Optimists
2. Text
3. Birth
4. Fat
5. Treadmill
6. Whiskey and Weed and L.S.D.
7. The Sad Boy
8. The Oswalt Family Crest
9. Rats
10. Orgy
11. Lofty Thoughts
12. First
13. Obama... and Time Travel... and Coolness... and the Last Racist
14. Demons
15. Sky Cake
16. Grocery Robots
17. Airplane
18. The Magician
