= Space Cop =

- Promotional release poster
- Directed by: Jay Bauman; Mike Stoklasa
- Screenplay by: Mike Stoklasa
- Story by: Mike Stoklasa; Rich Evans; Jay Bauman
- Produced by: Jay Bauman; Mike Stoklasa
- Starring: Rich Evans; Mike Stoklasa; Jocelyn Ridgely; Jay Bauman
- Cinematography: Jay Bauman
- Edited by: Jay Bauman
- Music by: Marty Meinerz
- Distributed by: Red Letter Media
- Release date: January 12, 2016
- Running time: 102 minutes
- Country: United States
- Language: English

Space Cop is a 2016 American science fiction action comedy film directed and produced by Jay Bauman and Mike Stoklasa, written by Stoklasa, Bauman, and Rich Evans, photographed and edited by Bauman, and starring Evans, Stoklasa, Bauman, Jocelyn Ridgely, Chike Johnson, Steve Piper, and Zach McLain. Produced and distributed by Red Letter Media, the film had been in production for at least seven years dating back to 2008.

Space Cop was released on Blu-ray on January 12, 2016, and on digital download on January 30, 2016.

== Premise ==
Space Cop, a highly disgruntled, impulsive, and destructive police officer from the future of 2058 (the future of space), accidentally travels back in time to 2007 after a pursuit through space causes him to travel through a time rift. He then spends eight years as a member of the Milwaukee Police Department.

After encountering two alien criminals he comes across during a heist at a cryonic storage facility, he is teamed up with a comparatively more methodical and by-the-book police officer from the past who is accidentally unfrozen in the present. They are tasked with apprehending a criminal known as the Gold Digger known for stealing exclusively gold-based items.

However, when they discover that the Gold Digger is in fact a part of a much bigger plan affected by alien lifeforms, they must defeat the evil aliens who threaten the present and the future.

== Cast ==
- Rich Evans as Space Cop (born Holden Madickey)
- Mike Stoklasa as Detective Ted Cooper
- Jocelyn Ridgely as Zorba
- Chike Johnson as Agnon
- Jay Bauman as Grigg
- Zack McLain as Charlie
- Alison Mary Forbes as Charlie's wife
- Dale R. Jackson as Chief Washington
- Clarence Aumend as Officer Partner
- Rick Pendzich as Officer Cunningham and hostage taker
- Patton Oswalt as Space Police Chief (uncredited)
- Freddie E. Williams II as Solitaire Man
- Len Kabasinski as Space Cop (Stunt Double)
- Steve Piper as Timmy’s dad

== Production ==
A documentary-style video released on the Red Letter Media channel on YouTube in 2020 features extensive behind-the-scenes material and details on the building and execution of various sets and scenes. As a general rule, only one larger set could be built at any time due to the physical restrictions of the facilities available to production. Additionally, while some digital effects usually related to simple green screens were used, decidedly practical movie tricks also came into play on several occasions. For example, in one scene featuring a pot of boiling water on a stove, the boiling effect had in fact been generated by Rich Evans blowing air through tubes attached to the pot's bottom (to avoid using actual boiling water, for safety).

== Release and reception ==
Space Cop was released straight to Blu-ray on January 12, 2016, and on digital download on January 30, 2016.

Mark Varley of Moviepilot wrote that, despite the filmmakers wanting "to make a film that was tongue in cheek...Space Cop was boring and unfunny". Felix Vasquez Jr. of Cinema Crazed wrote that the film is "a neat, if flawed, mash up of genres reserved for select movie fans that appreciate this kind of comedy, or have been loyal followers of the Red Letter Media team for years".
