= The Pennsylvania Macaroni Company =

EP by Patton Oswalt
- Released: 2006
- Recorded: 2006
- Genre: Comedy
- Length: 18:50
- Label: Chunklet Magazine

Patton Oswalt chronology
Patton vs. Alcohol vs. Zach vs. Patton (2005)	The Pennsylvania Macaroni Company (2006)	Werewolves and Lollipops (2007)

The Pennsylvania Macaroni Company is a comedy EP by Patton Oswalt. The EP features all improv, and includes Brian Posehn, Eugene Mirman, Maria Bamford as guests on the CD.

== Track listing ==
1. Two Miniature Joe Pescis – 6:41
2. Eugene Mirman & Maria Bamford Versus Brian Posehn – 3:56
3. Pennsylvania Macaroni Company (Opens at 10A.M. – Noon on Sunday) – 7:54
