= 2:22 =

2:22 may refer to:

- 2:22 (2008 film), a Canadian low-budget crime thriller
- 2:22 (2017 film), a science fiction thriller
- 2:22 A Ghost Story, a thriller play by Danny Robins

== See also ==
- 222 (disambiguation)
