= Werewolves and Lollipops =

Live album by Patton Oswalt
- Released: July 10, 2007
- Recorded: November 30 – December 2, 2006; Cap City Comedy Club; Austin, Texas
- Genre: Comedy
- Length: 58:11
- Label: Sub Pop
- Producer: Henry Owings

Patton Oswalt chronology
The Pennsylvania Macaroni Company (2006)	Werewolves and Lollipops (2007)	Frankensteins and Gumdrops (2008)

Werewolves and Lollipops is Patton Oswalt's second comedy album, following Feelin' Kinda Patton. It was recorded in Austin, Texas and released on July 10, 2007. The album also features a bonus DVD featuring an additional performance at the 40 Watt Club in Athens, Georgia.

The track "America Has Spoken" appears on the Sub Pop Records Facebook Sampler released on iTunes.

A limited release vinyl edition of five hundred copies was released by Stand Up! Records, in association with Sub Pop, in April 2010. The LP contained the bonus DVD as well as a free download code for the LP contents.

== Reception ==
Professional ratings
Review scores
Source	Rating
Allmusic	4.5/5 stars
Pitchfork Media	(8.0/10)
Almost Cool Music	(7.25/10)

The album garnered generally positive reviews upon its release. Almost Cool Music Review called Oswalt "One of the funnier comics working today." The Orange County weekly said of the album: "So gratifying and unhackneyed are Oswalt's scathing riffs that by disc's end, you want to buy him a bottle of wine that's beyond your price range." Stylus Magazine gave the album a B+, saying, " ... Werewolves is a classic comedy album in that it captures a seasoned comedian at his prime, spectacularly displaying his trademarks while proving himself able to bring in audiences skeptical of his cynicism." Pitchfork also referred to it as Oswalt's magnum opus.

== Track listing ==
1. "Here We Go" – 0:33
2. "America Has Spoken" – 3:26
3. "Beautiful People and a Bridge Troll" – 3:06
4. "Clean Filth" – 1:57
5. "The Miracle of Childbirth" – 2:39
6. "You Are Allowed 20 Birthday Parties" – 5:38
7. "The Dukes of Hazzard" – 2:11
8. "Alternate Earth" – 1:11
9. "Best Week Never" – 1:50
10. "Physics for Poets" – 4:05
11. "At Midnight I Will Kill George Lucas with a Shovel" – 4:35
12. "Bubble of Sanity" – 1:06
13. "Sterling, Virginia" – 1:19
14. "The Gatekeepers of Coolness" – 3:08
15. "Racist Cell Phones" – 1:40
16. "The Best Baby in the Universe" – 2:00
17. "Married & Single" – 0:16
18. "I Tell a Story About Birth Control and Deal with a Retarded Heckler" – 5:57
19. "Great Food Is Cooked by Psychos" – 2:34
20. "Wackity Schmackity Doo!" – 2:15
21. "Death Bed" – 3:47
22. "Cirque du Soleil" – 2:57

== Personnel ==
- Patton Oswalt – Performer
- Henry Owings – Production, Editing
- Randall Squires – Recording
- Dave Barbe – Mixing
- Jeff Capurso – Editing, Mastering, DVD Audio Mastering
- Adam Wingard – DVD Editing, Filming
- Kyle McKinnon – Filming
- Chris Hileke – Filming
- Curt Wells – Live Audio
- Ben Holst – DVD Audio Mixing
- Zeloot – Illustrations
- Ryan Russel – Photography
- Jeff Kleinsmith – Design
