= No Reason to Complain =

- Written by: Patton Oswalt
- Directed by: Paul Miller
- Starring: Patton Oswalt
- Country of origin: United States
- Original language: English

Production
- Running time: 42 minutes

Original release
- Release: April 4, 2006

No Reason to Complain is a stand up comedy performance by comedian Patton Oswalt, released on DVD by Comedy Central.

== Home media ==
The special was released on DVD by Comedy Central on April 4, 2006. It includes special features including deleted scenes and is completely uncensored and uncut (in contrast to the Comedy Central TV special of the same performance).
