= Patton vs. Alcohol vs. Zach vs. Patton =

Patton Vs. Alcohol Vs. Zach Vs. Patton

EP by Patton Oswalt
- Released: 2005
- Recorded: 2005
- Genre: Comedy
- Length: 27:40
- Label: Chunklet Magazine

Patton Oswalt chronology
Feelin' Kinda Patton (2004)	Patton Vs. Alcohol Vs. Zach Vs. Patton (2005)	The Pennsylvania Macaroni Company (2006)

Patton vs. Alcohol vs. Zach vs. Patton is a comedy EP by Patton Oswalt featuring Zach Galifianakis.

== Track listing ==
1. Patton Vs. Alcohol Vs. Zach Vs. Patton – 27:40
