= Jean-Pierre Boccara =

French-Italian-American impresario and nightclub owner

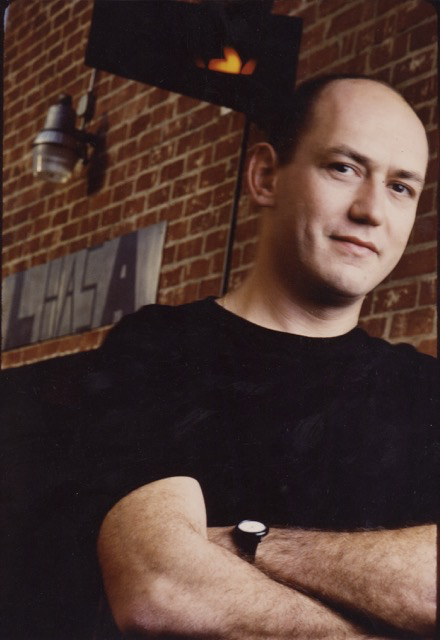
- Jean-Pierre Boccara
- Born: Tunisia
- Occupations: Nightclub owner, impresario
- Known for: Lhasa Club, Café Largo, and Luna Park (Los Angeles)

Jean-Pierre Boccara is a French, Italian, and American nightclub impresario, curator, entrepreneur, and artist in Los Angeles who founded the 300-person venue Lhasa Club in 1982 and later opened the larger Lhasaland, the cabaret-style Café Largo, and the 700-person Luna Park, which carried his experimental ethos through the 1990s until its closure in 2000. Boccara is recognized as a leading figure in Los Angeles’s multidisciplinary performance and nightclub culture. His venues hosted music, spoken word, cabaret, comedy, cinema, and multimedia performance, and were described as shaping the city’s avant-garde and alternative arts scenes in the 1980s and 1990s. They received coverage in outlets including the Los Angeles Times, LA Weekly, The New York Times, Newsweek, Rolling Stone, PBS, and the arts journal Artweek, and were later examined in peer-reviewed scholarly journals such as Framework: The Journal of Cinema & Media and Liminalities: A Journal of Performance Studies.

Contemporaries highlighted both Boccara’s role as a curator and the communities that gathered in his venues. Director David Schweizer said he was inspired by the “bridges being built to different worlds by Lhasa,” which led him to remain in Los Angeles and establish his Modern Artists collective. He later recalled it “became an event that symbolized the possibilities for crossing over between communities.” Playwright and performer Philip Littell compared his own work to that of founders Boccara and Anna Mariani, “because it’s based on the insane faith that the L.A. audience has a clear sense of itself, which is why Lhasa-Largo thrives.”

Writing in the Los Angeles Times, Douglas Sadownick emphasized the curatorial impact of Boccara and Mariani, noting that they “created the physical and mental space in which once distinct and competing art forms—like solo performance art, cabaret high jinks and shows pushing multicultural expression—could co-exist,” and that they “shaped and sustained the arts community.” He further situated the Lhasa Club in the cultural politics of the Reagan era, calling it “the closest thing ‘80s Los Angeles had to a prewar German night club-cum-cabaret” where “straight and gay poets, punks and performance artists mingled” during what artists described as “Mourning in America [sic].” Filmmaker MM Serra recalled, “Being a woman, the Lhasa Club was not as sexist, it was more open, more fluid.” She cited the space as formative for her films. Critics later noted that the clubs’ experimental spirit carried into other Los Angeles venues after their closure.

Newsweek dubbed Café Largo’s weekly poetry readings “Hollywood’s new brat pack of poets.” The Los Angeles Times called Luna Park “the creation of Jean-Pierre Boccara, genius of the Lhasa Club and Café Largo... The cabaret is just one aspect of a bi-level, avant-garde theme park.” Margaret Cho later reflected that Luna Park was “so important to comedians who wanted to experiment outside the constraints of the shtick comedy clubs.”

== Early life ==
Boccara is a Tunisian-born Italian who grew up in France. In Paris, he directed and produced two short films: L’Homme Désintégré (The Disintegrated Man, 1978) and Par Exemple: Le Poison Dans l’Eau (For Example: Poison in the Water, 1979). The latter was reportedly censored by the French government, which revoked its distribution rights as "an apology for terror." He moved to Los Angeles around 1980 as an aspiring filmmaker.

== The clubs ==
=== Lhasa Club (1982–1987), Santa Monica Boulevard in Hollywood ===
Boccara thought there "was a very lively underground scene in Los Angeles without too many appropriate places to present [art]," he remembers. "I hadn’t planned to open anything, but out of the blue a friend told me of [an available] space and I thought it would be great to have my art studio and throw some parties with friends." It became the Lhasa Club, founded in 1982 by Boccara and Anna Mariani, a small, approximately 100-person seated, 300 standing venue in Hollywood that they curated for music, spoken word, cabaret, comedy, dance, film screenings, and multimedia performance.

It was described as "that bastion of laissez-faire free enterprise in the realm of the arts," never known for "staid, conservative programming." The "pioneering" owners "created the physical and mental space in which once distinct and competing art forms—like solo performance art, cabaret high jinks and shows pushing multicultural expression—could co-exist," even though they later admitted they "had no idea what they were doing" when they began. "At its height, Lhasa contributed to Los Angeles’s national prominence in the field of performance art."

A retrospective in the Los Angeles Times referred to the "late and lamented Lhasa Club" and noted that screenwriter Michael Blake had performed there before gaining fame. An archived "In the News" page consolidates multiple stories about the club’s influence in Los Angeles nightlife. In a 2025 oral history with the Los Angeles Review of Books, Boccara described the Lhasa Club as providing a "vibrant, eclectic, and original" space, aiming to be avant-garde yet "clean and well-managed."

Philip Littell began his long tenure there with The Weba Show (1982), starring Littell, Weba Garretson and Jerry Frankel, directed by David Schweizer. The satirical production examined and parodied pop culture and became the club’s first major hit, described as the moment when "the Lhasa Club earned its stripes." It attracted significant media attention.

The post-punk Paisley Underground band scene found "common ground at Lhasa" where it "began to cohere into a bona fide scene." Among the early groups associated with that scene, The Bangles (then performing as The Bangs) held their The Real World EP release party there on October 7, 1982. Steve Wynn, whose label Down There Records was an early home of Paisley Underground releases, presented a Down There showcase at the club in 1987 that included Russ Tolman.

The club featured music acts such as Nick Cave, Jane's Addiction, Rick James, The Screamers’ Tomata Du Plenty, Ulysses Jenkins with his Othervisions Band, Chris Isaak and Flea. Punk frontman Jello Biafra presented political spoken word. The Independent Composers Association presented new music, An Evening of Composer-Performers in 1987. Spoken word, cabaret and comedy performers included Henry Rollins, who gave his first spoken word show there, Sandra Bernhard and Timothy Leary. Performance artists included The Mud People (later profiled by PBS), performance poet Linda Albertano, John Sex, and "performance art gurus" such as John Fleck and Ann Magnuson. Much of the footage was later compiled by Boccara into the film The Lhasa Tapes (1985), described as capturing "real avant-garde magic."

Mariani co-produced the live compilation album The Lives of Lhasa (1984), released on the club’s independent label, which included The Fibonaccis, Pell Mell, Linda J. Albertano, Necropolis of Love, Food and Shelter, Les Toulose, Pink Mink, Michael Peppe, Henry Rollins, among others. She and Boccara also established the nonprofit Lhasa Foundation to fund arts projects and preserve the spirit of the club beyond its lifespan. The goal was to create "a gala club, where you can eat in one room, watch performance art in another, listen to music in another."

In 2024, filmmaker Serra recalled the club’s significance to the avant-garde film community in Framework: The Journal of Cinema & Media. She wrote that the Lhasa Club was central to her artistic development, hosting the first public screenings of her films, and "MM cites many of the screenings she attended at the Lhasa Club… as greatly influential in both her work and personal relationships. MM remembers David Bowie showing up from time to time and a young Todd Haynes coming through as 'the guy who showed up from Brown University to show an early version of Dottie Gets Spanked'." In 1986, the club hosted The Invisible Cinema, a three-night international series presenting films from New Zealand, Canada, and the United States. It featured work by New Zealand–born animator Len Lye, American filmmaker Stan Brakhage, and New Zealand director Vincent Ward, alongside Emily Breer, Chris Gallagher, William Keddell, and Gregor Nicholas.

From 1985 to 1987, poet Doug Knott produced Doug Knott Presents, a series of forty-four "eclectic," "bizarre," and "esoteric" shows. These featured El Duce, English Frank, Merrill Ward of SWA, and poet Jerry the Priest; another included Exene Cervenka, James Intveld, Robin the Percussionist, Knott’s troupe The Lost Tribe, and Paul Roessler, 45 Grave, and the Nina Hagen Band. Additional programs brought in D. J. Bonebrake, Bill Bateman, and John Densmore, with music from the Holy Sisters of the Gaga Dada and Heather Haley & the Zealots, as well as a film by Modi and Cervenka. One of Knott’s Valentine’s programs, headlined by the Holy Sisters of the Gaga Dada, was called "Gothic camp-pop stuff that managed to be both ethereal and silly" and praised their "loopy but sincere crypto-psychedelic dance music" for adding "a dash of color to an often lackluster local scene." Performance studies scholar Edward Bruner later described Knott’s productions as modest but formative, situating them as part of a broader shift in Los Angeles performance art from club settings into "collective touring work." The Los Angeles Times also reflected that Knott’s shows at the Lhasa Club helped transplant its experimental spirit to other Los Angeles venues after the club’s closure.

Henry Rollins and Lydia Lunch played the last show at the Lhasa Club on New Year’s Eve 1987. The rent doubled, the landlord was difficult, and neither a lease nor liquor or dance licenses could be secured, as the club was located at Santa Monica Boulevard and Hudson Avenue, a residential neighborhood with rapidly rising rents. Boccara said “we never made enough to do more than pay rent and offer the artists a little here, a little there.”

=== Lhasaland (1988–1989), North Vine Street in Hollywood ===
On May 19, 1988, Boccara, Mariani, and Denny McGovern opened Lhasaland, a two-level concert and party hall with capacity for about 1,000 at the Musicians Hall at 817 North Vine Street in Hollywood. They presented live and recorded music along with sideshows associated with the earlier Lhasa Club, and hosted national acts including Devo, The Knitters, and Depeche Mode. Industry events such as LA Weekly’s tenth anniversary party were also staged there. Programming combined rock, rap, and experimental performance. A review of Firehose praised the group’s “innovative mix of rock and rap.”

Lhasaland faced recurring financial and operational problems and was shuttered briefly. Boccara later noted that although the venue often featured performance art and non-traditional music, booking ethnic artists was financially difficult, a challenge shared by other club owners at the time. By early 1989, it was reported that the club had been closed since January but was expected to reopen in the summer, and Boccara was still described as running it as late as July.

=== Café Largo (1989–1992), on Fairfax in Hollywood ===
Café Largo opened in 1989 as a 150-seat club and restaurant, founded and operated by Boccara and Mariani. It was described as “respectable-looking," “Bohemian-eclectic,” an " heir to the ancient tradition of artistic hangouts,” a continuation of the Lhasa Club’s cabaret ethos in a more formal setting, presenting a program of comedy, jazz, world music, spoken word, and record industry showcases.

The series Poetry in Motion drew standing-room-only crowds. Organized by Eve Brandstein and Michael Lally, both published poets with ties to the movie industry, the weekly readings combined celebrity participation with emerging voices, presenting “a balance of well-established poets, young poets and actors.” Appearances included Judd Nelson, Justine Bateman, Robert Downey Jr., Patti D'Arbanville, Ally Sheedy, and Dennis Christopher. The events were described as “poetry, Hollywood style,” with audiences responding with laughter, whistles, applause, or finger-snapping in the Beat tradition. Programs were created around themes such as Beauty and the Beatnik, Rebel Without a Pause, and Ecstasy, presenting a mix of professional poets and actors reading their own work, and actors interpreting established poets. Lally recalled skeptics becoming converts, while Brandstein noted that “some weeks there may not be any celebrities, but people are still coming to listen to poetry.” While some critics dismissed the readings as a fad, coverage also emphasized their staying power and growing audiences, describing a genuine cultural phenomenon that reconnected performers and listeners with the creative impulse.

The LA Weekly named Café Largo "LA's Best Supper Club" in 1990 and reported that it was "strongly supported by the local arts community." In 1990, the Indigo Girls recorded a set of cover songs at the venue for future B-sides. The venue was a focal point for live music (including Peter Himmelman, Victoria Williams, Suzanne Vega, Syd Straw, The Love Jones, Julie Christensen, Hugo Largo, Grant Lee Buffalo, Toad the Wet Sprocket; the Wild Colonials' regular Tuesday-night residency "helped secure the band a contract with DGC/Geffen", actor-musician Bill Mumy also performed with his band.), cabaret (Philip Littell "a strangely discomfiting mix of Pee-wee Herman and Noel Coward", the "extraordinary" Stephanie Vlahos, also house mezzo-soprano at the Los Angeles Opera, with dancer George de la Peña in Weill Thoughts, Lypsinka, who lip-synced in drag to ‘30s and ‘40s tunes, Ludar), and lounge act parodies (The Les Stevens Cocktail Show and The Fabulous Bud E. Luv).

Comedy at the venue featured Nora Dunn, Beth Lapides, Taylor Negron, Lotus Weinstock, S.A. Griffin, and Leif Skyving. Barry Yourgrau was noted for his “surreal stories” that blended spoken word with literary cabaret. Spoken word and poetry were also represented by Eve Brandstein, Tommy Cody, and Exene Cervenka. Performers also included Babooshka, the nutty chanteuse; Maureen Mahon, a chic torch singer; El Vez, the Mexican Elvis; the Hollywood Wow Cats, four guys singing a cappella songs; The Black Watch’s heavy metal routine; and Weba Garretson of Weba and her Wailing Turbans. Timothy Leary presented a four-part lecture series titled 1991: The New Breed, and a one-off with Danny Sugerman. In his travelogue Big Dreams: Into the Heart of California (1994), Bill Barich described a Café Largo poetry reading in which “one poet repeatedly slaps himself in the face,” using it to exemplify aspects of Los Angeles performance culture.

Boccara sold Café Largo in 1992. Under new ownership, it later evolved into Largo at the Coronet.

=== Luna Park (1993–2000), North Robertson Avenue in West Hollywood ===
Luna Park, Boccara’s final major Los Angeles venue, opened in 1993 as a 700-person nightclub and restaurant at 655 N. Robertson Avenue in West Hollywood. Its programming, ranging from acid jazz and world beat to cabaret, spoken word, and indie rock, was described as a continuation of his pioneering sensibility. Soon after opening, Boccara likened the emerging nightlife scene to television: “just like there will be 500 cable channels, there may be 500 clubs, each one doing a very specific thing.” He noted that the culture was becoming “exploding and compartmentalized,” with clubs increasingly tied to the identity of their promoters, who he predicted would become central “much like top chefs who attract foodies.”

Lorraine Ali wrote that “Eclecticism is the byword” at Luna Park, citing Andy Palacio’s calypso, the ambient rock of Downy Mildew, and urban folk sets by Exene Cervenka. She noted that Boccara’s booking plans underscored his aim to draw both “the arty crowd” and the children of Los Angeles’ economically privileged. Contemporary reviews described it as "an eclectic venue without Westside snobbery," with décor, dual stages, and global cuisine where the "music mix is ambitious: from acid jazz to world beat, from pop to torch singing," and as “two clubs in one,” with an upstairs stage and dance floor paired with a smaller cabaret room downstairs, a format that reinforced its supper-club character and eclectic programming.

Donovan tested new material. Ann Magnuson staged a character-driven performance with dancers, where “her exceptional band” played material from her just-released album The Luv Show. She also collaborated with Joey Arias on The Andy & Edie Show. The cabaret room hosted performers including Ed Crasnick, Barry Yourgrau, Rex Voto with Eszter Balint, and other experimental music and cabaret acts. Radiohead appeared on November 4, 1994, and Alanis Morissette performed on June 2, 1995. Milla Jovovich and Karen Black both used Luna Park to experiment with singing. A review described “a Brazilian 12-piece band [that] moved dancers upstairs [while] an Arab-Turkish group wowed the downstairs audience with sword-wielding belly dancers of both genders,” highlighting the venue’s dual-room setup.

The experimental jazz and improvisational series New Music Monday relocated to Luna Park in 1998. The "long-running" program that featured a rotating group of avant-garde musicians and composers was an "important regional seedbed for fringe music," with offerings that "lean toward rock or jazz with an emphasis on improvisation." Among the ensembles associated with the series was Stinkbug, whose members included guitarists Nels Cline and G.E. Stinson, bassist Steuart Liebig, and drummer Scott Amendola.

Henry Rollins recorded Henry Rollins: Live at Luna Park (2004), described in reviews as a "best-of collection of his weekly performances at the theater." His spoken-word residency also produced material for the album A Rollins in the Wry (2001).

UnCabaret, created by Beth Lapides, held a weekly Sunday residency from November 1993 until the club’s closure in 2000. It was described as Luna Park’s “must-see” and “the mother show of alternative comedy in L.A.,” a place where “comedians developed material,” including Julia Sweeney’s live show and film God Said Ha! and Laura Kightlinger’s book Quick Shots of False Hope: A Rejection Collection, Vol. 1 (1999); regular performers included Margaret Cho, Dana Gould, and Taylor Negron. The final UnCabaret show at Luna Park featured Margaret Cho, Michael Patrick King, and Andy Kindler. Lapides later reflected, “David Byrne talks about how the architecture of CBGB helped shape the music. The same is true for Luna Park and UnCabaret.”

Contemporary coverage described the club's finale as a warm send-off; the space was slated to become Moomba, and Boccara said he had “accomplished what [he] set out to do” and would move on to consulting and creative projects.

=== Later activity ===
In the 2010s and 2020s, Boccara's earlier venues were revisited in retrospectives and public-media features, and he exhibits multimedia work in the Joshua Tree and Yucca Valley area of Southern California.

== See also ==
- Largo (nightclub)
- Performance art
