= Finest Hour (album) =

Live album by Patton Oswalt
- Released: September 20, 2011
- Recorded: May 2011; Moore Theatre; Seattle, Washington
- Genre: Comedy
- Length: 75:52
- Label: Comedy Central Records

Patton Oswalt chronology
My Weakness Is Strong (2009)	Finest Hour (2011)	Tragedy Plus Comedy Equals Time (2014)

Finest Hour is the fourth comedy album by Patton Oswalt. It was released in 2011 under Comedy Central Records. It followed the 2009 release My Weakness Is Strong. In 2012, Finest Hour was nominated for the Grammy Award for Best Comedy Album, which was instead awarded to Louis C.K. for his performance in Hilarious.

== Track listing ==
1. The Miracle of Sweatpants – 2:55
2. The Parking Ticket – 3:41
3. The Gifted Child – 1:42
4. The Parental Defense – 1:45
5. The Stripper – 1:57
6. The Bugged Car – 2:02
7. The Dumb Gay Friend – 4:42
8. The Best Argument Against Gay Marriage – 2:27
9. The Invisible Anus – 1:11
10. The Power of Jesus – 2:55
11. The Vomit Bag – 4:29
12. The Magic of Cursive – 1:08
13. The Ham Incident – 3:39
14. The Museum of Spam – 2:22
15. The Weight Loss Plan – 2:07
16. The Limits of Dancing – 0:50
17. The Burroughs of Carbs – 2:19
18. The Circus Is in Town – 4:05
19. The Spirit Cave – 3:24
20. The Slob Avatar – 4:42
21. The Vestibule of Dreams – 2:48
22. The Best Comedy I've Ever Seen – 3:42
23. The Horror of New York City – 15:00
