= Un-Cabaret =

American comedy production company

- Genre: Sketch comedy Improvisation
- Date of premiere: 1988
- Location: Los Angeles, California, U.S.
- Official website

UnCabaret is a Los Angeles–based alternative comedy company that produces live, TV and web projects.

== History ==
UnCabaret was created by performance artist-turned comedian Beth Lapides whose frustration with the comedy club scene of the late 1980s in the Los Angeles lead her to seek 'a better way'. She began producing shows in 'alternative' venues and in 1988, with writer-producer Greg Miller, launched UnCabaret at The Women's Building.

In November 1993, UnCabaret was booked for three nights at Luna Park, a new music club in West Hollywood. Every Sunday night for the next seven years, Lapides gathered a group of performers to develop an idiosyncratic story based form of stand-up. The idea of the show was to be funny without doing an 'act' and use story-based stream-of-consciousness techniques rather than the set-up and punchline formula of mainstream standup.

In 1997, Comedy Central produced an UnCabaret TV special hosted by Lapides and featuring Taylor Negron, Dana Gould, Julia Sweeney, Kathy Griffin, Andy Dick and Scott Thompson.

When LunaPark closed, UnCabaret moved to the HBO Workspace (where they developed the show with Warner Bros), then to The Knitting Factory and M-Bar. UnCabaret went on an extended hiatus in 2008. In 2012, Lapides brought UnCabaret back.

== Television and film ==
- Four Episodes produced for Amazon, 2012
- Executive Producers: Beth Lapides, Mitch Kaplan, Adam Salky
- Episode 1: Greg Behrendt, Sandra Bernhard, Rob Delaney, Andy Dick, Karen Kilgariff, Alec Mapa
- Episode 2: Margaret Cho, Dana Gould, Taylor Negron, Tig Notaro, Garfunkel and Oates
- Episode 3: Greg Fitzsimmons, Jen Kirkman, Garfunkel and Oates, Greg Proops, Kira Soltanovich
- Episode 4: Carlie and Doni, Selene Luna, Rory Scovel, The Sklar Brothers, Casey Wilson
- Comedy Central Special, 1997

== Other projects ==
UnCabaret produces a spoken-word comedy show, "Say the Word", which features original first-person stories from TV comedy writers including Cindy Chupack, Jay Kogen, Winnie Holzman, Alan Zweibel, Peter Mehlman, Merrill Markoe, Kevin Nealon and others.

UnCabaret also produced The Other Network, a festival of un-aired TV pilots introduced by their creators, including Robert Smigel, Conan O'Brien, Bob Odenkirk, Judd Apatow and others.

== Radio and audio ==
100 episodes of "Radio UnCabaret" for Comedy World and Sirius Satellite Radio. 2000-2001

UnCabaret has been featured on “This American Life”, “All Things Considered”, “Morning Edition” and “Marketplace” on NPR.

Several compilation CDs including "Freak Weather Feels Different", "The Un & Only", "The Good, the Bad and the Drugly" and "Play the Word (vol. 1 & 2)".
