= 222 (Live & Uncut) =

Live album by Patton Oswalt
- Released: September 27, 2003
- Recorded: 40 Watt Club
- Genre: Comedy
- Length: 2:09:45
- Label: Chunklet Magazine
- Producer: Ron Baldwin; Henry H. Owings

Patton Oswalt chronology
222 (Live & Uncut) (2003)	Feelin' Kinda Patton (2004)

222 (Live & Uncut) is the unedited version of comedian Patton Oswalt's first comedy album Feelin' Kinda Patton. It was recorded at the 40 Watt Club in Athens, Georgia on September 27, 2003. The album has only one track on each of the two CDs. As of 2011, 222 is out of print but available digitally.

== Track listing ==
Disc One
No.	Title	Length
1.	"The Hero Who Saves The Day"	71:01

Disc Two
No.	Title	Length
2.	"The Villain Who Gets Away With It"	58:44

== Personnel ==
- Patton Oswalt – Performer
- Ron Baldwin – Producer
- Henry H. Owings – Producer
- Curt Wells – Recording Engineer
