= Red Letter Media =

Milwaukee film company

Red Letter Media, LLC
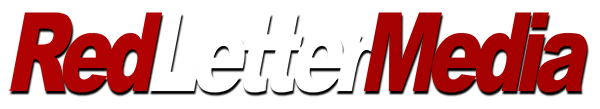
- Type: Private
- Industry: Film
- Founded: April 23, 2004; 22 years ago; Scottsdale, Arizona, U.S.
- Founder: Mike Stoklasa
- Headquarters: Milwaukee, Wisconsin, U.S.
- Area served: Worldwide
- Key people: Mike Stoklasa (CEO); Jay Bauman (editor); Rich Evans (stagehand)
- Products: Film reviews; Films; Web shows
- Owner: Mike Stoklasa

YouTube information
- Channel: RedLetterMedia
- Years active: 2007–present
- Genres: Film review; comedy
- Subscribers: 1.6 million
- Views: 1.4 billion
- Last updated: September 27, 2026
- Website: www.redlettermedia.com

Red Letter Media, LLC, sometimes stylised as RedLetterMedia, is an American film and video production company and YouTube channel operated by independent filmmakers Mike Stoklasa, Jay Bauman, and Rich Evans. It was formed by Stoklasa in 2004 while he was living in Scottsdale, Arizona, but has long been based in Milwaukee, Wisconsin.

The company attracted significant attention in 2009 through Stoklasa's 70-minute Mr Plinkett Review video essay on the 1999 film Star Wars: Episode I – The Phantom Menace. Via the company's YouTube account, Red Letter Media has created a number of web series, including reviews of contemporary films, retrospective film reviews, and humorous discussions of B movies and direct-to-video films. Videos on the channel typically include dry and blue humor.

The company and its members have produced a number of low-budget productions including Oranges: Revenge of the Eggplant, Feeding Frenzy, The Recovered, and Space Cop.

== Web series ==
=== Mr. Plinkett's Reviews (2008–present) ===
Stoklasa created his first video review for Star Trek Generations after watching the film again in 2008. Stoklasa believed his own voice sounded "too boring" for the review and adopted the persona of Harry S. Plinkett, a character he had previously used in several short films (originally portrayed by Rich Evans). Plinkett has been described as "cranky", a "schizophrenic", and "psychotic", with a voice that has been called "a cross between Dan Aykroyd in The Blues Brothers and The Silence of the Lambs' Buffalo Bill".

The Star Trek Generations Plinkett review was met with many favorable comments, inspiring Stoklasa to review the other three Star Trek: The Next Generation films—First Contact (1996), Insurrection (1998), and Nemesis (2002). After the Trek films, Stoklasa decided to produce a Plinkett review for Star Wars: Episode I – The Phantom Menace due to his dislike of the prequel trilogy and the way those films influenced a new generation of blockbuster filmmaking that was characterized by CGI spectacle in lieu of live-action stunts and meticulously crafted sets.

Despite a long run time of 70 minutes, Stoklasa's review of The Phantom Menace went viral, receiving over a million views in the first four months of its release, and being shared on social media by Simon Pegg and Damon Lindelof. The review took Stoklasa between seven and ten days to complete. Red Letter Media has also released an audio commentary track done in the Plinkett character for Star Wars, Star Wars: Episode I – The Phantom Menace.

Subsequent Plinkett reviews have covered Star Wars: Episode II – Attack of the Clones, Star Wars: Episode III – Revenge of the Sith, the James Cameron films Avatar and Titanic, the children's film Baby's Day Out, Indiana Jones and the Kingdom of the Crystal Skull, and J. J. Abrams' Star Trek amongst others.

In an interview, Stoklasa stated that in creating a review, he and a friend would watch the film only once while taking notes, frequently pausing the film to take a drink and discuss scenes. After that, he would write a 20–30 page script for it in the Plinkett character, voice it, and edit it together along with some improvisations.

After a five year hiatus, Stoklasa revived Mr. Plinkett in 2025 to address the current state of the Star Wars franchise.

=== Half in the Bag (2011–present) ===
Half in the Bag is a show where Mike Stoklasa and Jay Bauman review and discuss current movie releases, using a loose framing device where Stoklasa and Bauman play lazy VCR repairmen discussing movies instead of working. The series premiered on March 12, 2011, with a review of Drive Angry and The Adjustment Bureau.

=== Best of the Worst (2013–present) ===
Best of the Worst is a show in which members of the Red Letter Media cast watch bad movies and discuss them. The show typically features three movies, one of which is judged the "Best of the Worst" at the end, and the worst of which is occasionally destroyed in some way. Special episodes include "Spotlight", where the episode is dedicated to a single movie, "Wheel of the Worst", which focuses on esoteric instructional and children's videos, and "Black Spine", which features unlabelled VHS tapes. Regular panelists include Stoklasa, Bauman, Evans, along with other frequent collaborators. Celebrity guests have included Macaulay Culkin, Jack Quaid, Patton Oswalt, and Josh Robert Thompson. The series premiered January 23, 2013, featuring Russian Terminator, Ninja Vengeance, and Never Too Young to Die.

=== re:View (2016–present) ===
re:View is a show in which two members of the Red Letter Media cast discuss or review a previously released movie or television series (often one which has sentimental importance or personal value to the hosts) in a more minimalist format. The series premiered 24 May 2016, with an episode on Tremors.

=== The Nerd Crew: A Pop Culture Podcast (2017–2024) ===
The Nerd Crew is a parody series that features Stoklasa, Bauman, and Evans playing self-described "manchildren" demonstrating excessive enthusiasm for popular media properties such as Star Wars or the Marvel Cinematic Universe, where it is frequently made clear that such enthusiasm is performative due to having either received payment to promote the properties or in the hopes of receiving future preferential treatment from the owners of said properties. The videos produced as part of this series have been identified as parodying the content created by groups such as Screen Junkies and Collider.

The series premiered January 5, 2017.

=== Previously Recorded (2014–2018) ===
Previously Recorded is a video game oriented channel run by Rich Evans and frequent Red Letter Media collaborator Jack Packard. The channel was Red Letter Media's second attempt at producing gaming content after Game Station 2.0 (2012). The channel premiered July 18, 2014, with a discussion on Risk of Rain and ended with a livestream in July 2018.

== Commentary tracks ==
Since 2012, Red Letter Media has produced commentary tracks for various films, releasing them on Bandcamp.

== Nukie VHS auction ==
In early 2023, Red Letter Media auctioned off a graded VHS copy of the "infamously bad" 1987 film Nukie for charity, with the auction being inspired by reports that a VHS copy of Back to the Future had previously sold for $75,000. Alongside the auction, the group released a video documenting the practice of grading previously otherwise disposable media items, such as VHS tapes, to create a form of desired rarity. The company explained that they had collected over 100 copies of the film over the previous decade after fans began mailing them copies of the film, and had destroyed all of them, bar the one they had sent off for grading, via a woodchipper to increase the remaining tape's rarity. The release of the video saw some social media controversy over the perceived ethics regarding the destruction of the other tapes to raise the price of the auction.

The auction closed at $80,600 and was believed to have set a record for the most expensive VHS tape sold of all time. Proceeds from the auction were donated to the Wisconsin Humane Society and St. Jude Children's Research Hospital, with the donation to the Wisconsin Humane Society being the largest donation via a community fundraiser in the organization's history.

== Reception and influence ==
Red Letter Media has received positive reception and has been called "the reigning champ of online review culture". Chicago-based newspaper Daily Herald praised the company for their "wonderful" videos, identifying Best of the Worst as their most entertaining series.

Film critic Roger Ebert spoke positively about Red Letter Media; upon viewing Mr. Plinkett's Revenge of the Sith review, Ebert posted it on his website, stating, "I was pretty much sure I didn't have it with me to endure another review of this one. Mr. Plinkett demonstrates to me that I was mistaken."

In an interview with Esquire, comedian Patton Oswalt noted that the Mr. Plinkett reviews are an example of "amazing film scholarship" on the Star Wars prequels that demonstrate how much of the Star Wars universe is squandered by them. The Daily Telegraph called the reviews "legendary" and described them as being more popular than the actual films.

Literary and cultural critic Benjamin Kirbach argues that Plinkett enacts a kind of détournement by recontextualizing images that would otherwise serve as Star Wars marketing material (such as behind-the-scenes footage and interviews), and that Stoklasa uses this tactic to construct a subversive narrative that frames George Lucas as "a lazy, out-of-touch, and thoroughly unchallenged filmmaker".

== Filmography ==
=== Feature films ===
- Gorilla Interrupted (2003)
- Oranges: Revenge of the Eggplant (2004)
- The Recovered (2008)
- Feeding Frenzy (2010)
- How Not to Make a Movie (2013)
- Doc of the Dead (2014) (segments)
- Space Cop (2016)

=== Web series ===
==== Ongoing ====
- Mr. Plinkett Reviews (2008–present)
- Half in the Bag (2011–present)
- Best of the Worst (2013–present)
- re:View (2016–present)
- ...Talk About (2018–present)
- Spitballs (2023–present)

==== Discontinued ====
- Produce Isle (c. 2006–2007)
- The Grabowskis (2007–2008)
- The Dude Bros (2009)
- Game Station 2.0 (2012)
- Quick Cuts (2013–2014)
- Previously Recorded (2014–2018)
- The Nerd Crew: A Pop Culture Podcast (2017–2024)
