= Patton Oswalt =

American comedian and actor (born 1969)

- Oswalt c. 2025
- Born: Patton Peter Oswalt; January 27, 1969 (age 57); Portsmouth, Virginia, U.S.
- Education: College of William & Mary (BA)
- Occupations: Stand-up comedian; actor
- Spouses: Michelle McNamara (m. 2005; died 2016) Meredith Salenger (m. 2017)
- Children: 1

Comedy career
- Years active: 1988–present
- Medium: Stand-up; television; film
- Genres: Observational comedy; black comedy; insult comedy; sarcasm; satire; deadpan
- Subjects: American culture; American politics; human behavior; pop culture; current events; religion
- Website: www.pattonoswalt.com

Patton Peter Oswalt (born January 27, 1969) is an American stand-up comedian and actor. His acting roles include Spence Olchin in the sitcom The King of Queens (1998–2007) and narrating the sitcom The Goldbergs (2013–2023) as adult Adam F. Goldberg. After making his acting debut in the Seinfeld episode "The Couch", he has appeared in a variety of television series, such as Parks and Recreation, Community, Two and a Half Men, Agents of S.H.I.E.L.D., Drunk History, Reno 911!, Mystery Science Theater 3000, Archer, Veep, Justified, Kim Possible, WordGirl, Modern Family, Brooklyn Nine-Nine and We Bare Bears. He portrayed Principal Ralph Durbin in A.P. Bio (2018–2021) and voiced Matthew the Raven in the TV series The Sandman (2022–2025)

Patton Oswalt has voiced Remy in the animated film Ratatouille (2007), various characters in the animated series BoJack Horseman (2014–2020), Max in the animated film The Secret Life of Pets 2 (2019) where he replaced Louis C.K., Jesse (male) in the game Minecraft: Story Mode, and M.O.D.O.K. in the 2021 animated series of the same name. Other film credits include Man on the Moon (1999), Zoolander (2001), Blade: Trinity (2004), All Roads Lead Home (2008), Big Fan (2009), A Very Harold & Kumar 3D Christmas (2011), 22 Jump Street (2014), and The Circle (2017). In the Marvel Cinematic Universe (MCU) multimedia franchise, Oswalt guest starred as the Koenigs on Agents of S.H.I.E.L.D. (2014–2020) and voiced Pip the Troll in Eternals (2021). He was also in the web series Best of the Worst in 2019. As a stand-up comedian, Patton Oswalt has appeared in six stand-up specials and won a Primetime Emmy Award for Outstanding Writing for a Variety Special and a Grammy Award for Best Comedy Album for the album of his Netflix special Patton Oswalt: Talking for Clapping (2016).

== Early life ==
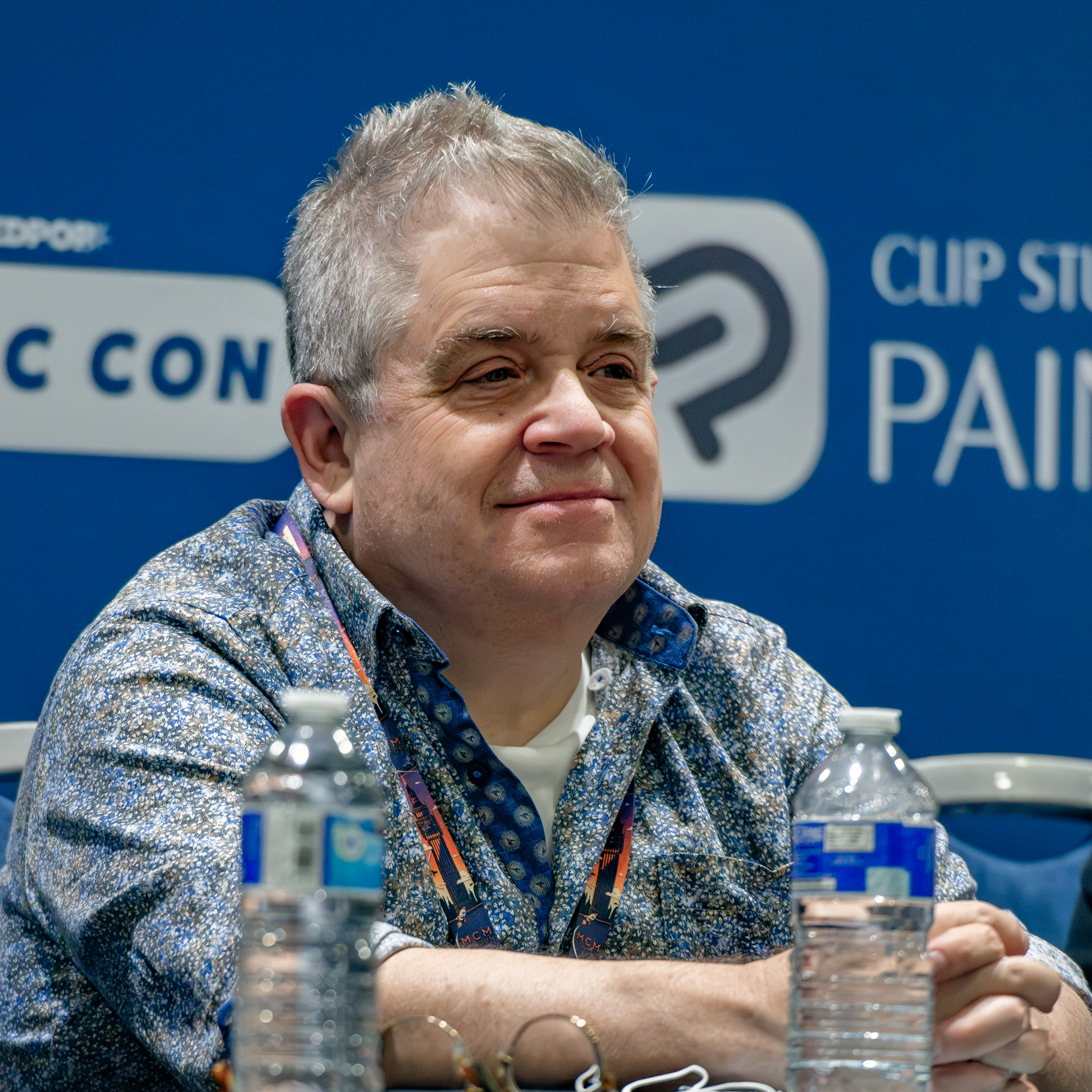
Oswalt at MCM ComicCon London in 2025

Patton Peter Oswalt was born on January 27, 1969, in Portsmouth, Virginia, to Carla and Larry J. Oswalt, a career United States Marine Corps officer. He was named after General George S. Patton. He has one younger brother, Matt Oswalt, a comedy writer best known for writing and starring in the YouTube web series Puddin'. While he was a military brat, his family lived in Ohio and in Tustin, California, before settling in Sterling, Virginia. He is a 1987 graduate of Broad Run High School in Ashburn, Virginia. As a senior, he won first place for humorous dramatic interpretation in the Region II, Group AA forensics meet. He later attended the College of William & Mary where he majored in English and graduated with a Bachelor of Arts in 1991, and was initiated into the Alpha Theta chapter of the Phi Kappa Tau fraternity. In May 2023, Oswalt was made an honorary Doctor of Arts by William & Mary. He lived in San Francisco in the 1990s, where he said, "It was cheap, so, so cheap, and I was a young, hopeful comedian."

== Career ==
Patton Oswalt's influences include Jonathan Winters, Richard Pryor, Emo Philips, Blaine Capatch, Jim Goad, Bill Hicks, Bobcat Goldthwait, Sam Kinison, Steve Martin, and Louis C.K. He began performing stand-up comedy on July 18, 1988. After writing for MADtv and starring in his own 1996 comedy special for HBO, he went on to garner roles in films and television shows, making his film debut with in the 1996 military comedy film Down Periscope alongside Kelsey Grammer. His television debut was on the Seinfeld episode "The Couch". His most prominent and longest running role was as Spence Olchin on The King of Queens. His first starring film role was as the voice of Remy, the lead character in the 2007 Academy Award-winning Pixar film Ratatouille. He has also appeared in smaller roles in such films as Magnolia and 22 Jump Street.

Patton Oswalt is a longtime reader of comics, in particular DC Comics. He discussed his love of the medium in his stand-up, and having written comics stories. His writing credits include "JLA: Welcome to the Working Week", a backup story in Batman #600; a story for Dwight T. Albatross's The Goon Noir #01 and a story for Masks: Too Hot for TV. He is also a cinephile, having watched 4,000 films, including 720 films from 1995 to 1999 at the New Beverly Cinema. Expanding his voice artist repertoire, he began voicing the villainous character Tobey on PBS Kids GO! series WordGirl in 2007.

His work in roast comedy includes appearances in the Comedy Central Roast of William Shatner in 2006 and the Comedy Central Roast of Flavor Flav in August 2007. That same year, he appeared on an episode of SpongeBob SquarePants, "The Original Fry Cook", as Jim. Oswalt moderated a reunion panel of the Mystery Science Theater 3000 cast at San Diego Comic-Con in 2008.

Patton Oswalt played Paul Aufiero, the leading role in Robert D. Siegel's 2009 directorial debut, Big Fan. He was set to star in a 2010 Broadway revival of Lips Together, Teeth Apart. The show was postponed, then eventually canceled, when Megan Mullally left the production after the director denied her request to replace Oswalt due to his lack of stage experience.

He starred in the Showtime drama United States of Tara as Neil, an employee of Four Winds Landscaping. He also provided the voice of Thrasher, a robot protagonist from the Cartoon Network show Robotomy.

Patton Oswalt emceed the 2010 BookExpo America, promoting his then-upcoming book Zombie Spaceship Wasteland and introducing the evening's panelists: Christopher Hitchens, William Gibson, and Sara Gruen. Oswalt released Zombie Spaceship Wasteland in 2011.

Patton Oswalt played the role of Hurlan Heartshe in the 2011 surrealist comedy miniseries The Heart, She Holler on Cartoon Network's late-night programming block, Adult Swim. Oswalt appeared in the 2011 film A Very Harold & Kumar 3D Christmas. Oswalt played Matt Freehauf in Jason Reitman's 2011 black comedy Young Adult. He played Billy Stanhope, ex-best friend of Ashton Kutcher's Walden Schmidt on Two and a Half Men in 2012.

From September 2013 to May 2023, Oswalt narrated all 10 seasons of the TV series The Goldbergs. He also had a recurring role as Constable Bob Sweeney in the fourth season of the FX series Justified.

Patton Oswalt played the role of Agent Koenig on the TV series Agents of S.H.I.E.L.D. He later appeared in separate episodes as brothers Eric and Billy Koenig. He continued to appear in the second season as Billy and a third brother named Sam. In season four, he also played a fourth brother, Thurston.

Patton Oswalt's memoir Silver Screen Fiend: Learning About Life from an Addiction to Film was published by Simon & Schuster in 2015. He also voiced the male version of Jesse in Minecraft: Story Mode, which was released in October 2015.

Patton Oswalt played Max in the reboot of Mystery Science Theater 3000, as the son of Frank Conniff's character TV's Frank. The program premiered on Netflix in 2017. That same year, he provided the voice of horror icon Boris Karloff in several episodes of film critic Karina Longworth's podcast You Must Remember This, for the season entitled "Bela and Boris".

Patton Oswalt had a voice-over role in science fiction comedy film Sorry to Bother You, which was released in theaters on July 6, 2018.

Patton Oswalt replaced Louis C.K. in the 2019 animated film The Secret Life of Pets 2, as the voice of main character Max. In addition, he reprised his role as Professor Dementor in the Disney Channel Original Movie Kim Possible, a live-action adaptation of the 2002-2007 animated series.

On April 15, 2019, Oswalt joined a host of other writers in firing their agents as part of the WGA's stand against the Association of Talent Agents (ATA) and the practice of packaging.

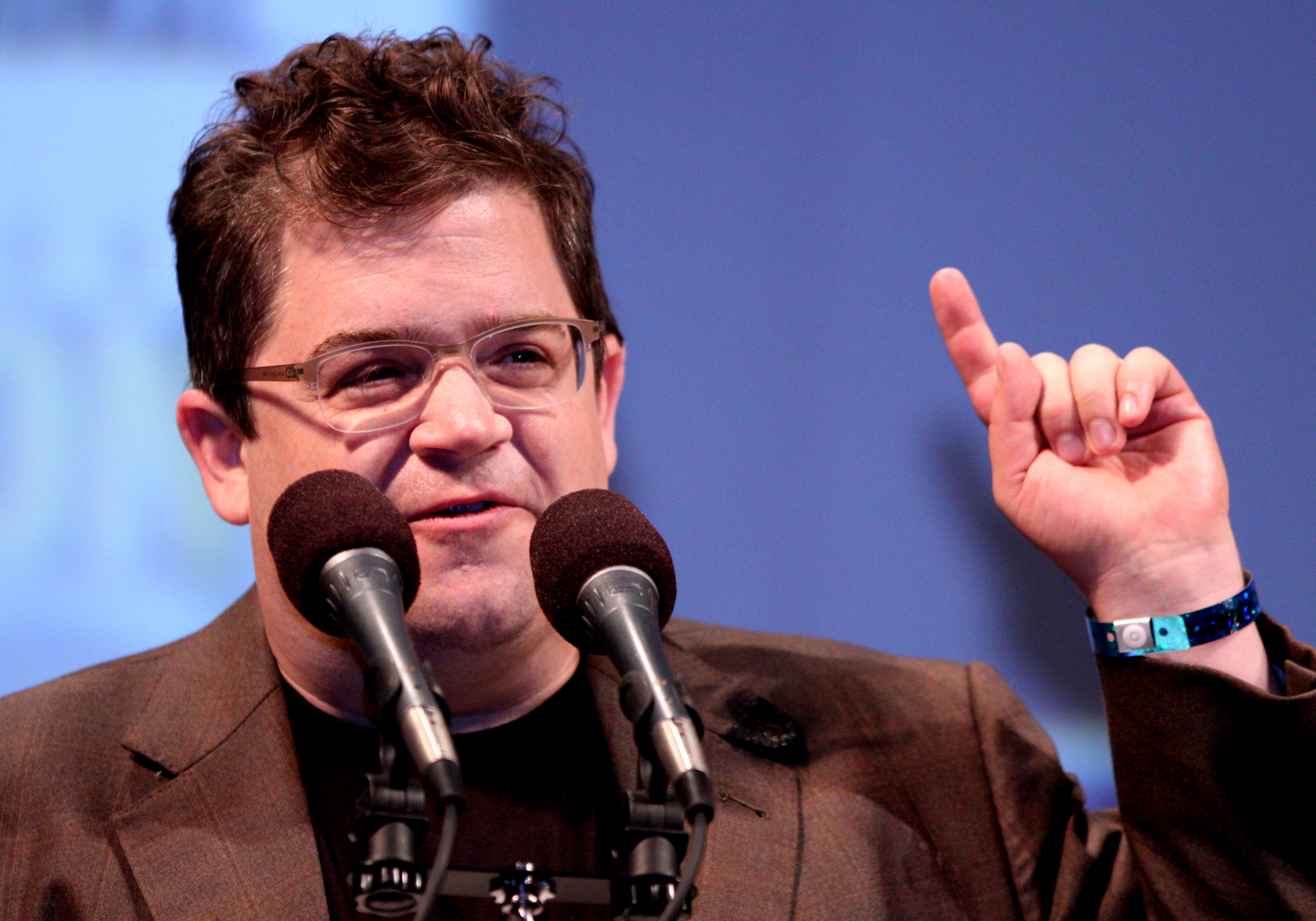
Oswalt at the 2010 San Diego Comic-Con

Oswalt's stand-up comedy covers topics ranging from pop culture frivolity, such as comic book supervillains and 1980s glam metal, to deeper social issues like American excess, materialism, foreign policy, and religion. He also discusses his atheism in his stand-up. He recorded his third comedy album at the Lisner Auditorium at George Washington University in Washington, D.C., on February 28, 2009. It premiered on Comedy Central as Patton Oswalt: My Weakness Is Strong on August 23, 2009, and was released on DVD August 25, 2009.

An animated video of Patton's take on New Song's Christmas Shoes was posted on YouTube in November 2009. The audio was recorded at Lisner Auditorium in Washington, D.C.

Oswalt's album Patton Oswalt: Finest Hour was released on September 19, 2011. The extended and uncensored DVD of this special was released in April 2012, a few days after its television premiere on Comedy Central.

Oswalt's comedy special Tragedy Plus Comedy Equals Time was to be released on January 16, 2014, via online streaming website Epix, but was pushed back by the company for unknown reasons. However, it did premiere on Comedy Central on April 6, 2014, and became available for purchase on April 8, 2014, in both DVD and CD format.

Oswalt's comedy special Talking for Clapping was released on Netflix on April 22, 2016. For the album, he received a Primetime Emmy Award for Outstanding Writing for a Variety Special and a Grammy Award for Best Comedy Album.

Oswalt's comedy special Annihilation was released on Netflix on October 17, 2017.

In an episode of Hiking with Kevin Nealon on YouTube, posted November 14, 2019, Oswalt confirmed a new special, I Love Everything, recorded three weeks prior to the recording of the hike. It is currently airing on Netflix and was nominated for another Primetime Emmy Award.

He was featured in an ad campaign for Caesars Sportsbook in 2021, playing a character named Carl.

He was featured on the first season of the primetime Celebrity Jeopardy! from January 12 to February 2, 2023.

In May 2024, Oswalt began hosting the FOX game show The 1% Club. Oswalt left the show in 2025.

In July 2024, it was announced that Netflix was in early development on a television series based on Minor Threats, the comic series created by Oswalt, Jordan Blum, and Scott Hepburn and published by Dark Horse Comics. Oswalt and Blum are set to serve as writers, showrunners and executive producers, with Hepburn also executive producing.

In November 2024, Deadline Hollywood announced that Oswalt was boarding the Oscar-contending short Sardinia as Executive Producer alongside his wife, actress Meredith Salenger. He called the film, which stars Philip Ettinger, Emmy-winner Martha Plimpton, Olek Krupa and Breeda Wool, "an effortlessly original piece of work" and "beyond timely”.

== Personal life ==
Oswalt married true crime writer and journalist Michelle McNamara on September 24, 2005. In April 2009, McNamara gave birth to their daughter, Alice. At age nine, Alice made her voiceover debut on the TV series My Little Pony: Friendship Is Magic, as Wind Sprint, which saw her working alongside her father, who voices the character of Quibble Pants, and Alice's stepmother, Meredith Salenger, who plays Clear Sky.

In 2013, he teamed up with PETA, spoke out against chaining pet dogs, and sent a letter to the mayor and members of the city council of Newport News, Virginia, urging them to ban the practice.

McNamara died in her sleep in the family's Los Angeles home on April 21, 2016. Her death was attributed to a combination of a previously undiagnosed heart condition and complications from ingested medications, including Adderall, Xanax, and fentanyl. The season-three finale of The Goldbergs was dedicated to her memory.

On August 1, 2016, Patton Oswalt announced that he had been working to complete McNamara's unfinished nonfiction book about the Golden State Killer. In September 2017, Oswalt announced that the book, titled I'll Be Gone in the Dark, was scheduled for release on February 27, 2018, and was subsequently available for preorders. Less than two months after the book's release, on April 25, 2018, the Sacramento County Sheriff's Department announced they had made an arrest in the Golden State Killer case. Oswalt posted a brief video to Instagram, saying: "I think you got him, Michelle." He also posted on Twitter that same day, saying that he hoped to visit the suspect if he was indeed the Golden State Killer, "not to gloat or gawk – to ask him the questions that [McNamara] wanted answered in her 'Letter to an Old Man'" at the end of her book.

Patton Oswalt has been diagnosed with clinical depression, which he has dealt with throughout his adult life. He has incorporated these experiences into his comedy routines.

In July 2017, he and actress Meredith Salenger confirmed their engagement. They were married in November 2017.

As of 2017, Patton Oswalt "remained friendly" with alt-right author Jim Goad; in a Facebook post that year, Oswalt wrote that Goad "can fucking write ... And, unlike a lot of the failed comedians and sad punks on the alt-right, he isn't in it for the 'lulz' and doesn't affect a bullshit nihilist pose."

Patton Oswalt is an outspoken atheist and has referred to his atheism in his comedy specials: No Reason to Complain, Feelin' Kinda Patton, My Weakness Is Strong, and Finest Hour.

Patton Oswalt is a progressive and a supporter of the Democratic Party, having endorsed Barack Obama for re-election as president in 2012 and Joe Biden in 2020. Oswalt has been an outspoken critic of Donald Trump. In January 2019, following an intense Twitter feud with a Trump supporter, he donated $2,000 to the man's GoFundMe fund created to help cover his medical expenses.

== Discography ==
=== Comedy albums ===
Year	Title	Label	Chart positions				
Year	Title	Label	Top 200	US Comedy	US Digital	US Indie	US Heat
2003	222	Chunklet Magazine	—	—	—	—	—
2004	Feelin' Kinda Patton	United Musicians	—	—	—	—	—
2007	Werewolves and Lollipops	Sub Pop	137	1	—	18	4
2009	My Weakness Is Strong	Warner Bros.	67	1	5	—	—
2011	Finest Hour	Comedy Central Records	71	1	—	12	—
2014	Tragedy Plus Comedy Equals Time	Comedy Central Records	54	1	19	9	—
2016	Talking for Clapping	Aspecialthing Records	—	6	—	—	—
2018	Annihilation	Netflix	—	—	—	—	—
2020	I Love Everything	Netflix	—	—	—	—	—
2023	We All Scream	800 Pound Gorilla Records	—	—	—	—	—

=== EPs ===
- Patton vs. Alcohol vs. Zach vs. Patton (2005) with Zach Galifianakis
- Melvins/Patton Oswalt split 7 (2006) with Melvins
- Comedians of Comedy Tour (2006)
- The Pennsylvania Macaroni Company (2006) with Brian Posehn, Maria Bamford, and Eugene Mirman
- Frankensteins and Gumdrops (2008) - available during the WFMU pledge drive

Compilation album appearances

- Beth Lapides's Un-Cabaret – The Un & Only (2002)
- Beth Lapides's Un-Cabaret – The Good, The Bad, and the Drugly (2006)
- Comedy Death-Ray (2007)

== Awards and nominations ==
=== Emmy Awards ===
Year	Category	Title	Result	Ref.
Primetime Emmy Awards
2016	Outstanding Writing for a Variety Special	Patton Oswalt: Talking for Clapping	Won	
2018	Outstanding Writing for a Variety Special	Patton Oswalt: Annihilation	Nominated	
2019	Outstanding Actor in a Short Form Comedy or Drama Series	An Emmy for Megan	Nominated	
2020	Outstanding Writing for a Variety Special	Patton Oswalt: I Love Everything	Nominated	
Daytime Emmy Awards
2022	Outstanding Daytime Program Host	Penguin Town	Nominated	
2022	Outstanding Travel, Adventure and Nature Program	Penguin Town	Won	

=== Grammy Awards ===
Year	Category	Title	Result	Ref.
2010	Best Comedy Album	My Weakness Is Strong	Nominated	
2012	Best Comedy Album	Finest Hour	Nominated	
2015	Best Comedy Album	Tragedy Plus Comedy Equals Time	Nominated	
2017	Best Comedy Album	Talking for Clapping	Won	
2019	Best Comedy Album	Annihilation	Nominated	
2021	Best Comedy Album	I Love Everything	Nominated	
2023	Best Comedy Album	We All Scream	Nominated	

=== Miscellaneous awards ===
Year	Award	Category	Title	Result	Ref.
2007	Annie Awards	Voice Acting in a Feature Production	Ratatouille	Nominated	
2009	Gotham Awards	Breakthrough Actor	Big Fan	Nominated	
2009	St. Louis Film Critics Association Awards	Best Actor	Big Fan	Nominated	
2011	Central Ohio Film Critics Association Awards	Best Supporting Actor	Young Adult	Nominated	
2011	Chicago Film Critics Association Awards	Best Supporting Actor	Young Adult	Nominated	
2011	Critics' Choice Movie Awards	Best Supporting Actor	Young Adult	Nominated	
2011	Detroit Film Critics Society Awards	Best Supporting Actor	Young Adult	Nominated	
2011	Los Angeles Film Critics Association Awards	Best Supporting Actor	Young Adult	Runner-up	
2011	National Society of Film Critics Awards	Best Supporting Actor	Young Adult	3rd Place	
2011	Palm Springs International Film Festival	Vanguard Award for Creative Ensemble	Young Adult	Won	
2011	Santa Barbara International Film Festival	Virtuoso Award	Young Adult	Won	
2011	Toronto Film Critics Association Awards	Best Supporting Actor	Young Adult	Runner-up	
2011	Village Voice Film Poll	Best Supporting Actor	Young Adult	8th Place	
2013	Critics' Choice Television Awards	Best Guest Performer in a Comedy Series	Parks and Recreation	Won	
2013	Gold Derby Awards	Best Comedy Guest Actor	Parks and Recreation	Nominated	
2013	Online Film & Television Association Awards	Best Guest Actor in a Drama Series	Justified	Nominated	
2014	American Comedy Awards	Comedy Special of the Year	Tragedy Plus Comedy Equals Time	Nominated	
2014	Writers Guild of America Awards	Comedy/Variety (Music, Awards, Tributes) – Specials	29th Independent Spirit Awards	Nominated	
2016	Visual Effects Society Awards	Honorary Membership	—N/a	Honored	
2020	Dreamachine International Film Festival	Best Voice-Over Performance	52 - A Tale of Loneliness	Won	
2021	Dublin International Short Film and Music Festival	Best Actor	The Priest	Nominated	
2021	Hollywood Critics Association TV Awards	Best Supporting Actor in a Streaming Series, Comedy	A.P. Bio	Nominated	
2022	Newport Beach Film Festival	Artist of Distinction Award	—N/a	Honored	

== Writing ==
=== Nonfiction ===
- The Overrated Book (co-author with Henry H. Owings, Last Gasp (publisher), San Francisco, 2006) OCLC 65203542 ISBN 0867196572
- Justice League of America: The Lightning Saga (foreword, DC Comics, 2008)
- The Rock Bible: Unholy Scripture for Fans & Bands (co-author with Henry H. Owings, Quirk Books, Philadelphia, 2008) ISBN 1594742693
- Zombie Spaceship Wasteland (Scribner, 2011) OCLC 555639819
- Silver Screen Fiend: Learning About Life from an Addiction to Film (Simon & Schuster, 2015) OCLC 885377924
- Oswalt, Patton (May 3, 2016). "Patton Oswalt Remembers His Wife, Michelle McNamara: 'She Steered Her Life With Joyous, Wicked Curiosity'". Time.
- Oswalt, Patton (December 2, 2016). "Patton Oswalt's Year of Magical Parenting". GQ.

=== Comics ===
- JLA: Welcome to the Working Week (DC Comics, 2003)
- The Goon: Noir (co-author with Thomas Lennon, Steve Niles, and Eric Powell, Dark Horse Comics, 2007)
- Bart Simpson's Treehouse of Horror 13 (contributor to anthology comic) (Bongo Comics, 2007)
- Serenity: Float Out (Dark Horse Comics, 2010)
- Better Days and Other Stories (co-author with Will Conrad, Dark Horse Comics, 2011) OCLC 751718642
- Sky Cake! (co-author with Kona Morris, Jon Olsen, Chris Henry. Godless Comics, 2012) OCLC 933277633
- M.O.D.O.K.: Head Games (co-writer with Jordan Blum. Marvel Comics, Dec 2020)
- Black Hammer: Visions #1 (Dark Horse Comics, February 2021)
- Minor Threats (co-writer with Jordan Blum. Dark Horse Comics, 2022)
- From the World of Minor Threats: The Alternates (co-writer with Jordan Blum and Tim Seeley. Dark Horse Comics, 2023)
