= Necropolis of Love =

- Origin: Berkeley, California, United States
- Genres: New wave, synthpop, gothic rock
- Years active: 1981–1987
- Labels: Thumb Records
- Past members: Peter Vinella (guitar, keyboards)); Dave "Slave" Velasquez (vocals, guitar, keyboards); Tim Hesla (bass, saxophone); Bill Zelinski (drums, percussion)
- Website: http://www.myspace.com/necropolisoflove1

Necropolis of Love was a new wave/synthpop band which formed in 1981 in Berkeley, California.

The group was often categorized as gothic rock or new wave; however, in a conversation with the prominent musician Iggy Pop, Necropolis of Love band member David Velasquez described the band's sound as "hostile disco music".

== Discography ==
- In Search Of... 12" EP (1983, Thumb Records)
- The Hope 12" EP (1984, Thumb Records)

== Singles ==
- "Talk" (1982, Thumb Records)
