= Feelin' Kinda Patton =

Live album by Patton Oswalt
- Released: June 29, 2004
- Recorded: 40 Watt Club
- Genre: Comedy
- Length: 72:03
- Label: United Musicians
- Producer: Ron Baldwin; Henry H. Owings

Patton Oswalt chronology
222 (Live & Uncut) (2003)	Feelin' Kinda Patton (2004)	Patton vs. Alcohol vs. Zach vs. Patton (2005)

Alternative cover

Alternative cover

Professional ratings
Review scores
Source	Rating
Stylus Magazine	(B)
Allmusic	4/5 stars

Feelin' Kinda Patton is stand-up comedian Patton Oswalt's first comedy album. It is a recording of a performance at the 40 Watt Club in Athens, Georgia. Feelin' Kinda Patton is an abridged version of the previously released 222 (Live & Uncut). A limited vinyl edition of this album was issued in May 2008 by Stand Up! Records and features a cover with cut out playset and characters from the album by Mike 2600.

== Track listing ==
No.	Title	Length
1.	"The Sadness Begins"	0:50
2.	"A Man Shaves His Balls"	1:17
3.	"Facts About Midgets"	1:07
4.	"How We Won the War"	1:00
5.	"When You Buy a Humvee"	0:39
6.	"America, the Retarded Trust Fund Kid"	0:54
7.	"A Blowjob Behind the Tilt-A-Whirl"	1:01
8.	"Come On Apocalypse"	1:57
9.	"Your Moment of Irony"	1:30
10.	""We're Here, We're Queer...!""	0:52
11.	"The Gay Pride Parade"	1:14
12.	"The Winning Team"	2:08
13.	""Two More Sips""	0:55
14.	"Liquor Everywhere"	3:50
15.	"The World's Most Amazing Father"	2:42
16.	"I Hate Hippies"	2:19
17.	"80's Metal"	3:36
18.	"The Poetry of Pornography"	5:54
19.	"Steak"	3:02
20.	"A Brief History of Shitty Comedy"	2:02
21.	"Toronto Open Mic"	5:15
22.	"TIVO!"	2:19
23.	"My Christmas Memory"	2:01
24.	"Stella D'Oro"	2:54
25.	"Robert Evans/The Sadness Ends"	6:13
26.	"Piss Drinkers"	4:21
27.	"Tom Carvel!"	3:35
28.	"The Magic of Oil Painting/Easter Eggs"	6:17

== Personnel ==
- Patton Oswalt - Performer
- Ron Baldwin - Producer
- Henry H. Owings - Producer
- Chris Bilheimer - Design
- Fred Maher - Mixing
- Brian McCall - Photography
- Curt Wells - Live Recording Engineer
