= Beth Lapides =

American comedian

- Born: United States

Comedy career
- Medium: Stand-up comedy, television, film

Beth Lapides (/ləˈpiːdʌs/; lə-PEE-dəs) is an American writer, comedian, producer and host, best known for creating Un-Cabaret.

== Un-Cabaret ==
Lapides is the creator, host and producer of Un-Cabaret, a live show that has become widely acknowledged as the first alt-comedy show and a critical venue for the Los Angeles "alternative comedy" movement. Lapides wrote about it for an LA Weekly cover story on the occasion of the 25th Anniversary Show for CAP/UCLA at the Theatre at Ace Hotel.

Un-Cabaret has produced five critically acclaimed CDs including The Un and Only. Spinoff productions from Un-Cabaret have included Say the Word, a story-telling show; The Other Network, a show featuring unaired pilots, and the UnCab Lab, a student workshop.

Recordings from Un-Cabaret have been featured on This American Life.

Un-Cabaret was produced as a special for Comedy Central. And there are four on Amazon. Notable shows that emerged from Un-Cabaret include Julia Sweeney's God Said Ha! and Laura Kightlinger's book Quick Shots of False Hope.

== Writing ==
Lapides has written commentaries for NPR's All Things Considered.

Lapides's first book Did I Wake You?: Haikus for Modern Living was published in 2007.

She created So You Need to Decide an audiobook original that discusses complex life decisions.

== Host ==
Lapides has hosted Un-Cabaret live and in all media since its inception. This has included residencies in nine Los Angeles venues including weekly runs at LunaPark, The Knitting Factory, HBO Workspace, First and Hope and since January 2018, a monthly residency at Rockwell Table and Stage.

Lapides' podcast Life and Beth are half an hour conversations in which guests are asked to talk about the stories that most make them. Beth's guests have included Lily Taylor, Willem Dafoe, Margaret Cho, Daniel Radcliffe, Ana Gasteyer and others. Her radio show, The Beth Lapides Experience, ran for a year on the short-lived Comedy World Radio. In addition she hosted Radio UnCabaret for the network.

== Theatre ==
Lapides has been a creative force in the solo show arena. She began her career in the downtown NY art scene of the 1980s where she created pieces for The Kitchen, PS 122, Club 57, Danceteria, and others. She received several National Endowment for the Arts grants and toured to theaters, universities and art centers like ICA Boston, ICA London, Oberlin College, University of Iowa, Hallwalls etc.

== Stand-up comedy ==
Lapides has devoted most of her time as a stand-up comedian to her work at Un-Cabaret but she has also worked in countless comedy clubs including The Improv, The Laugh Factory, The Comedy Store, Comedy U, and The Comic Strip.

== First Lady campaign ==
Lapides ran a satirical 1992 campaign to make First Lady an elected position. She was featured on CNN, The Montel Williams Show and was invited to be on Oprah. People magazine, the Los Angeles Times, and Interview magazine all covered the campaign.

== Filmography ==
Lapides appeared in the sixth season of Sex and the City TV series as the performance artist Marina Abramović in the twelfth episode "One" (2003), in which Carrie meets Aleksandr. Lapides wrote a piece for the New York Times Magazine about it, which was killed the night before publication.

== Art ==
Lapides began her career as a visual artist in New York. Her work was shown at Dance Theater Workshop and The Metropolitan Museum of Art Library among others. Her more recent work has been featured in film and television.
