= Patton Oswalt: Tragedy Plus Comedy Equals Time =

- Epix poster
- Written by: Patton Oswalt
- Directed by: Bobcat Goldthwait
- Starring: Patton Oswalt
- Country of origin: United States
- Original language: English

Production
- Producers: John Irwin; Patton Oswalt; Dave Rath; Michael J. Simmons; Casey Spira
- Cinematography: Jay Lafayette
- Editor: Sean Hubbert
- Running time: 59 minutes
- Production companies: Generate; Irwin Entertainment

Original release
- Network: Comedy Central
- Release: April 6, 2014

Patton Oswalt: Tragedy Plus Comedy Equals Time is a 2014 stand-up comedy special written and performed by Patton Oswalt, and directed by Bobcat Goldthwait. The performance was recorded at Spreckels Theater in San Diego, California.

It was to be released on January 16, 2014, via Epix but was pushed back by the network for unknown reasons. However, it did premiere on Comedy Central on April 6 and became available for purchase on April 8 in both DVD and CD format.

== Track listing ==
1. "My Fitness Future" – 3:41
2. "Florida" – 5:57
3. "I Am a Great Dad" – 4:45
4. "I Am an Awful Dad" – 5:04
5. "Adorable Racism" – 5:14
6. "Creative Depression" – 6:38
7. "Money and Pussy" – 2:42
8. "Sellout" – 10:52
9. "New Clothes" – 5:41
10. "My Prostitute" – 4:29
11. "Germany" – 5:14
12. "Epilogue: Orudis Blamphfortt" – 8:27
