= La Jolla Playhouse production history =

List of productions at California playhouse

The La Jolla Playhouse is an American nonprofit, professional theater-in-residence on the campus of the University of California, San Diego. It was founded in 1947 by Gregory Peck, Dorothy McGuire, and Mel Ferrer.

The following is a chronological list of the productions that have been staged since its inception.

== 1947 ==
- Angel Street by Patrick Hamilton
- The Shining Hour by Keith Winter
- Tonight at 8.30 ... The Astonished Heart, Fumed Oak, Still Life by Noël Coward
- Biography by S. N. Behrman
- The Guardsman by Ferenc Molnár
- The Hasty Heart by John Patrick
- Dear Ruth by Norman Krasna
- Night Must Fall by Emlyn Williams

== 1948 ==
- The Male Animal by James Thurber and Elliott Nugent
- Rope by Patrick Hamilton
- Serena Blandish (The Difficulty of Getting Married) by S. N. Behrman
- Ultra-Marine by Peter Blackmore
- The Glass Menagerie by Tennessee Williams
- For Love or Money by F. Hugh Herbert
- The First Mrs. Fraser by St. John Ervine
- The Road to Rome by Robert E. Sherwood
- Kind Lady by Edward Chodorov

== 1949 ==
- Petticoat Fever by Mark Reed
- Command Decision by William Wister Haines
- Arms and the Man by George Bernard Shaw
- Art and Mrs. Bottle by Benn Levy
- The Importance of Being Earnest by Oscar Wilde
- Light Up the Sky by Moss Hart
- Arrangement for Strings by Michael Clayton Hutton and Samuel Rosen
- Here Today by George Oppenheimer
- Blithe Spirit by Noël Coward

== 1950 ==
- Goodbye Again by Allan Scott and George Haight
- Clutterbuck by Benn Levy
- The Silver Whistle by Robert E. McEnroe
- Our Town by Thornton Wilder
- The Front Page by Ben Hecht and Charles MacArthur
- Arsenic and Old Lace by Joseph Kesselring
- Summer and Smoke by Tennessee Williams
- Claudia by Rose Franken
- Born Yesterday by Garson Kanin

== 1951 ==
- On Borrowed Time by Paul Osborn
- The Petrified Forest by Robert E. Sherwood
- Room Service by John Murray and Allen Boretz
- Come Back, Little Sheba by William Inge
- The Voice of the Turtle by John Van Druten
- Susan and God by Rachel Crothers
- Second Threshold by Philip Barry
- Ring Round the Moon by Jean Anouilh, translation by Christopher Fry

== 1952 ==
- The Lady's Not for Burning by Christopher Fry
- Strike a Match by Robert Smith
- The Corn Is Green by Emlyn Williams
- The Happy Time by Samuel A. Taylor
- Affairs of State by Louis Verneuil
- Season in the Sun by Wolcott Gibbs
- Time for Elizabeth by Groucho Marx and Norman Krasna
- Remains to be Seen by Howard Lindsay and Russel Crouse
- The Moon Is Blue by F. Hugh Herbert

== 1953 ==
- Don Juan In Hell by George Bernard Shaw
- Dial M for Murder by Frederick Knott
- You Never Can Tell by George Bernard Shaw
- Stalag 17 by Donald Bevan and Edmund Trzcinski
- The Dazzling Hour by Anna Bonacci
- My Three Angels by Sam and Bella Spewack
- Jane by S. N. Behrman, based on an original story by W. Somerset Maugham
- I Am a Camera by John Van Druten

== 1954 ==
- The Vacant Lot by Paul Streger and Berrilla Kerr
- The Seven Year Itch by George Axelrod
- Sabrina Fair by Samuel A. Taylor
- Anniversary Waltz by Jerome Chodorov and Joseph Fields
- The Winslow Boy by Terence Rattigan

== 1955 ==
- Oh, Men! Oh, Women! by Edward Chodorov
- The Time of the Cuckoo by Arthur Laurents
- Native Uprising by D. N. Roman
- The Rainmaker by N. Richard Nash

== 1956 ==
- The Little Hut by André Roussin
- Pal Joey by John O'Hara, music by Richard Rodgers, lyrics by Lorenz Hart
- Miss Julie & The Stronger by August Strindberg
- King of Hearts by Jean Kerr and Eleanor Brooke
- Bus Stop by William Inge

== 1957 ==
- Androcles and the Lion / The Proposal by George Bernard Shaw / Anton Chekhov
- Career by James Lee
- The Potting Shed by Graham Greene
- Paul and Constantine by Dario Bellini
- The Reluctant Debutante by William Douglas-Home

== 1958 ==
- Visit to a Small Planet by Gore Vidal
- A View from the Bridge by Arthur Miller
- Bell, Book and Candle by John Van Druten

== 1959 ==
- Too Many Husbands by W. Somerset Maugham
- Once More, with Feeling! by Harry Kurnitz
- Two for the Seesaw by William Gibson
- Who Was That Lady I Saw You With? by Norman Krasna
- Look Homeward, Angel by Ketti Frings, based on the novel by Thomas Wolfe

== 1983 ==
- Romeo and Juliet by William Shakespeare
- A Mad World, My Masters by Barrie Keeffe
- The Visions of Simone Machard by Bertolt Brecht

== 1984 ==
- As You Like It by William Shakespeare
- War Babies by Robert C. Coe
- Maybe I'm Doing It Wrong by Randy Newman
- Big River: The Adventures of Huckleberry Finn by William Hauptman, music and lyrics by Roger Miller

== 1985 ==
- The Seagull by Anton Chekhov
- Ghost on Fire by Michael Weller
- A Man's a Man by Bertolt Brecht
- Merrily We Roll Along by George Furth, music and lyrics by Stephen Sondheim

== 1986 ==
- Ajax by Sophocles, adapted by Robert Auletta
- Gillette by William Hauptman
- Figaro Gets a Divorce by Ödön von Horváth
- The Three Cuckolds by Leon Katz
- Shout Up a Morning by Paul Avila Mayer and George W. George, music by Julian Adderley and Nathaniel Adderley, lyrics by Diane Charlotte Lampert

== 1987 ==
- Silent Edward by Des McAnuff
- The Tempest by William Shakespeare
- The School for Wives by Molière, translation by Richard Wilbur
- A Walk in the Woods by Lee Blessing
- Hedda Gabler by Henrik Ibsen
- The Matchmaker by Thornton Wilder

== 1988 ==
- 80 Days by Snoo Wilson, music and lyrics by Ray Davies
- The Fool Show by Geoff Hoyle
- Lulu by Frank Wedekind
- Two Rooms by Lee Blessing
- Once in a Lifetime by Moss Hart and George S. Kaufman

== 1989 ==
- The Man Who Had No Story by Oana-Marie Hock
- Macbeth by William Shakespeare
- The Misanthrope by Molière
- Down the Road by Lee Blessing
- Dangerous Games - Two Tango Pieces by Jim Lewis and Graciela Daniele, lyrics by William Finn, music by Astor Piazzolla
- Nebraska by Keith Reddin
- The Grapes of Wrath by John Steinbeck

== 1990 ==
- Twelfth Night by William Shakespeare
- My Children! My Africa! by Athol Fugard
- Don Quixote De La Jolla by Eric Overmyer
- A Funny Thing Happened on the Way to the Forum by Burt Shevelove and Larry Gelbart, music and lyrics by Stephen Sondheim
- Life During Wartime by Keith Reddin
- The Cherry Orchard by Anton Chekhov

== 1991 ==
- Elmer Gantry by John Bishop, music by Mel Marvin, lyrics by Bob Satuloff
- A Lesson from Aloes by Athol Fugard
- The Heliotrope Bouquet by Eric Overmyer
- The Regard of Flight and The Clown Bagatelles by Bill Irwin
- Fortinbras by Lee Blessing
- Three Sisters by Anton Chekhov

== 1992 ==
- Much Ado About Nothing by William Shakespeare
- The Swan by Elizabeth Egloff
- Marisol by José Rivera
- Playland by Athol Fugard
- What the Butler Saw by Joe Orton
- The Who's Tommy by Pete Townshend
- Le Petomane - A Comedy of Airs by Paul Magid
- The Glass Menagerie by Tennessee Williams

== 1993 ==
- Sweet & Hot: The Songs of Harold Arlen, music by Harold Arlen, lyrics by Harold Arlen, Truman Capote, Ira Gershwin, Yip Harburg, Ted Koehler, Johnny Mercer, Leo Robin, Billy Rose and Jack Yellen
- The Mission by Richard Montoya, Ric Salinas, and Herbert Siguenza
- Luck, Pluck & Virtue by James Lapine
- The Hairy Ape by Eugene O'Neill
- Arms and the Man by George Bernard Shaw
- Children of Paradise: Shooting a Dream by Steven Epp, Felicity Jones, Dominique Serrand and Paul Walsh

== 1994 ==
- How to Succeed in Business Without Really Trying by Abe Burrows, Jack Weinstock, and Willie Gilbert, music and lyrics by Frank Loesser
- Mump and Smoot in Ferno by Michael Kennard and John Turner
- The Good Person of Setzuan by Bertolt Brecht
- Thérèse Raquin by Neal Bell
- The Triumph of Love by Pierre Carlet de Chamblain de Marivaux
- Harvey by Mary Chase

== 1995 ==
- Randy Newman's Faust, book, music, lyrics by Randy Newman
- An Almost Holy Picture by Heather McDonald
- Slavs! Thinking about the Longstanding Problems of Virtue and Happiness by Tony Kushner
- A Midsummer Night's Dream by William Shakespeare
- Cloud Tectonics by José Rivera
- The Invisible Circus/Le Cirque Invisible by Victoria Chaplin

== 1996 ==
- Valley Song by Athol Fugard
- Boy by Diana Son
- The Green Bird by Carlo Gozzi
- Happy Days by Samuel Beckett
- Yanks & Frogs by Theatre de la Jeune Lune
- 2.5 Minute Ride by Lisa Krion

== 1997 ==
- Harmony: A New Musical by Bruce Sussman, music by Barry Manilow
- Having Our Say by Emily Mann
- The Model Apartment by Donald Margulies
- Rent by Jonathan Larson
- The School for Wives by Molière
- The Importance of Being Earnest by Oscar Wilde

== 1998 ==
- Maricela De La Luz Lights the World by José Rivera
- Dogeaters by Jessica Hagedorn
- Light Up the Sky by Moss Hart
- Improbable Theatre's 70 Hill Lane by Phelim McDermott
- The Captain's Tiger: A Memoir for the Stage by Athol Fugard
- Guitar Lessons: The Springhill Singing Disaster by Karen Trott
- Nora by Henrik Ibsen, adapted by Ingmar Bergman

== 1999 ==
- The Flimflam Man by Melanie Marnich
- Sweet Bird of Youth by Tennessee Williams
- Wonderland by Chay Yew
- Pretty Fire by Charlayne Woodard
- Jane Eyre by John Caird and Paul Gordon
- Loot by Joe Orton
- Oo-Bla-Dee by Regina Taylor

== 2000 ==
- Alice's Wild Ride by Karen Hartman
- Thoroughly Modern Millie by Richard Morris and Dick Scanlan, music by Jeanine Tesori
- Going to St. Ives by Lee Blessing
- The Cosmonaut's Last Message to the Woman He Once Loved in the Former Soviet Union by David Greig
- Sheridan, or Schooled In Scandal by David Grimm
- Lifegame by Keith Johnstone
- Blood Wedding by Federico García Lorca, translation by David Johnston

== 2001 ==
- The Origin of Corn / El Origen De Maiz by Ralph Lee
- Dracula, The Musical by Christopher Hampton and Don Black, music by Frank Wildhorn
- Diva by Howard Michael Gould
- The Laramie Project by Moisés Kaufman and Leigh Fondakowski
- Be Aggressive by Annie Weisman
- I Am My Own Wife by Doug Wright
- The Collected Works of Billy The Kid by Michael Ondaatje
- Our Town by Thornton Wilder

== 2002 ==
- Ladybird: The Life and Time of a Roller Derby Queen by Luis Alfaro
- Mabou Mines' Peter and Wendy by J. M. Barrie
- Adoration of the Old Woman by José Rivera
- I Think I Like Girls by Leigh Fondakowski
- Wintertime by Charles L. Mee
- When Grace Comes In by Heather McDonald
- A Feast of Fools by Geoff Hoyle, music by Gina Leishman
- Tartuffe by Molière, translation by Richard Wilbur

== 2003 ==
- The Breeze, the Gust, the Gale, and the Wind by Hilly Hicks
- The Comedy of Errors by William Shakespeare
- Beauty by Tina Landau
- Eden Lane by Tom Donaghy
- The Country by Martin Crimp
- The Burning Deck by Sarah Schulman
- Fräulein Else by Arthur Schnitzler
- Uncle Vanya by Anton Chekhov

== 2004 ==
- Guitar by Julia Jordan
- Private Fittings by Georges Feydeau, adapted by Mark O'Donnell
- Jersey Boys by Marshall Brickman and Rick Elice, music by Bob Gaudio, lyrics by Bob Crewe
- The Love of Three Oranges by Carlo Gozzi, adaptation by James Magruder
- Paris Commune by Steve Cosson and Michael Friedman
- Suitcase by Melissa James Gibson
- Continental Divide: Mothers Against and Daughters of the Revolution by David Edgar
- 700 Sundays / Billy Crystal / A Life In Progress by Billy Crystal

== 2005 ==
- Pop Tour: Bay and the Spectacles of Doom by Julia Cho
- Palm Beach, The Screwball Musical by Robert Cary and Benjamin Feldman, music by David Gursky
- Zhivago by Michael Weller, music by Lucy Simon, lyrics by Michael Korie and Amy Powers
- Current Nobody by Melissa James Gibson
- I Am My Own Wife by Doug Wright
- The Scottish Play by Lee Blessing
- The Miser by Molière
- Much Ado About Nothing by William Shakespeare
- Pop Tour: West of the 5 by Sunil Kuruvilla

== 2006 ==
- Zhivago by Michael Weller, music by Lucy Simon, lyrics by Michael Korie and Amy Powers
- Mother Courage and Her Children by Bertolt Brecht
- All Wear Bowlers by Geoff Sobelle and Trey Lyford
- Culture Clash's Zorro in Hell by Richard Montoya, Ric Salinas and Herbert Sigüenza
- The Wiz by William F. Brown, music and lyrics by Charlie Smalls
- The Farnsworth Invention by Aaron Sorkin, music by Andrew Lippa

== 2007/08 ==
- Carmen by Sarah Miles, music by John Ewbank
- The Deception, adapted from La Fausse Suivante by Pierre Marivaux
- After the Quake by Haruki Murakami
- The Adding Machine by Elmer Rice
- Cry-Baby by John Waters
- The Seven by Will Power, music by Will Power, Will Hammond, Justin Ellington
- Most Wanted by Jessica Hagedorn, music by Mark Bennett

== 2008/09 ==
- 33 Variations by Moisés Kaufman
- The Night Watcher by Charlayne Woodard
- Memphis (musical) by Joe DiPietro
- The Third Story by Charles Busch
- Tobacco Road by Erskine Caldwell
- Xanadu by Douglas Carter Beane
- The Edge Series

== 2009/10 ==
- Unusual Acts of Devotion by Terrence McNally
- Creditors, adapted and directed by Doug Wright
- Restoration
- Herringbone
- The 39 Steps
- Bonnie & Clyde by Frank Wildhorn, Don Black and Ivan Menchel
- Aurélia's Oratorio by Aurélia Thierrée Chaplin
- The Laramie Project: Ten Years Later, directed by Darko Tresnjak
- The Edge Series: Dogugaeshi and HOOVER COMES ALIVE!

== 2010/11 ==
- Surf Report by Annie Weisman
- A Midsummer Night's Dream by William Shakespeare
- Limelight: The Story of Charlie Chaplin by Christopher Curtis and Thomas Meehan
- Notes from Underground, adapted by Bill Camp and Robert Woodruff from the novel by Fyodor Dostoevsky
- Ruined by Lynn Nottage
- Little Miss Sunshine, music and lyrics by William Finn; Book and Direction by James Lapine

== 2011/12 ==
- A Dram of Drummhicit by Arthur Kopit and Anton Dudley
- Peer Gynt by Henrik Ibsen and adapted by David Schweitzer
- Sleeping Beauty Wakes, music and lyrics by Brendan Milburn and Valerie Vigoda Book by Rachel Sheinken
- Milk Like Sugar by Kirsten Greenidge
- Jesus Christ Superstar, music by Andrew Lloyd Webber, lyrics by Tim Rice
- American Night: The Ballad of Juan José by Richard Montoya

== 2012/13 ==
- Hands on a Hardbody, music by Trey Anastasio and Amanda Green, lyrics by Amanda Green, book by Doug Wright
- Blood and Gifts by J. T. Rogers
- The Nightingale, music and lyrics by Duncan Sheik and Steven Sater, book by Steven Sater
- An Iliad by Homer, adapted by Denis O'Hare and Lisa Peterson
- Glengarry Glen Ross by David Mamet
- Yoshimi Battles the Pink Robots by Wayne Coyne and Des McAnuff

== 2013/14 ==
- His Girl Friday by Ben Hecht and Charles MacArthur, adapted by John Guare
- Tribes by Nina Raine
- Sideways, book by Rex Pickett
- The Tallest Tree in the Forest by Daniel Beaty
- Side Show, music by Henry Krieger, book and lyrics by Bill Russell
- The Who & The What by Ayad Akhtar

== 2014/15 ==
- Chasing the Song, book by Joe DiPietro, music by David Bryan, lyrics by Joe DiPietro and David Bryan
- The Orphan of Zhao, adapted by James Fenton
- Ether Dome by Elizabeth Egloff
- Kingdom City by Sheri Wilner
- The Hunchback of Notre Dame by Peter Parnell, music by Alan Menken, lyrics by Stephen Schwartz, novel by Victor Hugo

== 2015/16 ==
- Come from Away, book, music, and lyrics by Irene Sankoff and David Hein
- Up Here, book, music, and lyrics by Robert Lopez and Kristen Anderson-Lopez
- Blueprints to Freedom by Michael Benjamin Washington
- Healing Wars by Liz Lerman
- Indecent by Paula Vogel
- Guards at the Taj by Rajiv Joseph

== 2016/17 ==
- Latin History for Dummies, created and performed by John Leguizamo
- Hollywood by Joe DiPietro
- The Last Tiger in Haiti by Jeff Augustin
- Junk: The Golden Age of Debt by Ayad Akhtar
- Tiger Style! by Mike Lew
- Miss You Like Hell, book by Quiara Alegría Hudes, music by Erin McKeown, lyrics by Quiara Alegría Hudes and Erin McKeown
- Freaky Friday, book by Bridget Carpenter, music and lyrics by Tom Kitt and Brian Yorkey, based on the novel by Mary Rodgers

== 2017/18 ==
- Escape to Margaritaville – book by Greg Garcia and Mike O'Malley, music and lyrics by Jimmy Buffett
- At the Old Place – by Rachel Bonds
- Kill Local – by Mat Smart
- Wild Goose Dreams – by Hansol Jung
- SUMMER: The Donna Summer Musical – book by Colman Domingo, Robert Cary, and Des McAnuff
- Mike Birbiglia: The New One – by Mike Birbiglia
- The Cake – by Bekah Brunstetter
- Home of the Brave – by Lee Cataluna

== 2018/19 ==
- The Squirrels by Robert Askins
- Queens by Martyna Majok
- Seize the King by Will Power
- Hundred Days by The Bengsons and Sarah Gancher
- The Year to Come by Lindsay Ferrentino
- Diana by Joe DiPietro, music and lyrics by David Bryan

== 2019/20 ==
- Put Your House in Order by Ike Holter
- The Luckiest by Melissa Ross
- The Coast Starlight by Keith Bunin
- Kiss My Aztec! by John Leguizamo and Tony Taccone, music by Benjamin Velez, lyrics by David Kamp, Benjamin Velez, and John Leguizamo
- Cambodian Rock Band by Lauren Yee
- FLY by Rajiv Joseph, music by Bill Sherman, lyrics by Kirsten Childs and Rajiv Joseph, based on the book Peter and Wendy by J.M. Barrie

== 2021/22 ==
- The Garden by Charlayne Woodard
- To The Yellow House by Kimber Lee
- Bhangin' It: A Bangin' New Musical by Mike Lew and Rehana Lew Mirza, music and lyrics by Sam Willmott

== 2022/23 ==
- Lempicka by Carson Kreitzer and Matt Gould
- Here There Are Blueberries by Moises Kaufman and Amanda Gronich
- Fandango for Butterflies (And Coyotes) by Andrea Thome, music by Sinuhe Padilla
- Kristina Wong, Sweatshop Overlord by Kristina Wong
- As You Like It by William Shakespeare
- The Outsiders by Adam Rapp, music and lyrics by Jamestown Revival, based on the novel by S.E. Hinton

== 2023/24 ==
- Love All by Anna Deveare Smith
- Is It Thursday Yet? by Jenn Freeman and Sonya Tayeh, composed by Holland Andrews
- The Untitled Unauthorized Hunter S. Thompson Musical by Joe Iconis and Gregory S. Moss, music and lyrics by Joe Iconis
- SUMO by Lisa Sanaye Dring
- Babbitt by Joe DiPietro, based on the novel by Sinclair Lewis
- Redwood by Tina Landau, music by Kate Diaz, lyrics by Kate Diaz and Tina Landau

== 2024/25 ==
- The Ballad of Johnny and June by Des McAnuff and Robert Cary with music by Johnny Cash and June Carter Cash
- Derecho by Noelle Viñas
- Velour: A Drag Spectacular by Sasha Velour and Moises Kaufman
- Primary Trust by Eboni Booth
- Your Local Theater Presents: A Christmas Carol, by Charles Dickens, Again by Anna Ouyang Moench
- 3 Summers of Lincoln by Joe DiPietro, lyrics by Daniel J. Watts and Joe DiPietro, music by Crystal Monee Hall

== 2025/26 ==
- Jaja's African Hair Braiding by Jocelyn Bioh
- Indian Princesses by Eliana Theologides Rodriguez
- The Heart by Kait Kerrigan with music by Anne Eisendrath and Ian Eisendrath
- All the Men Who've Frightened Me by Noah Diaz
- Working Girl by Theresa Rebeck with music by Cyndi Lauper
- The Recipe by Claudia Shear

== 2026/27 ==
- Purpose by Branden Jacobs-Jenkins
- The Monsters by Ngozi Anyanwu
- The Family Album by Sam Chanse, MILCK, AG and Jess Mcleod
- Grim by Joey Orton, Brad Silnutzer with music by Petro AP and Scott Hoying
- A Black-billed Cuckoo By Mat Smart
- Particle Fever by David Henry Hwang with music by Bear McCreary and Zoe Sarnak
