= Chris M. Allport =

American actor

Christopher M. Allport
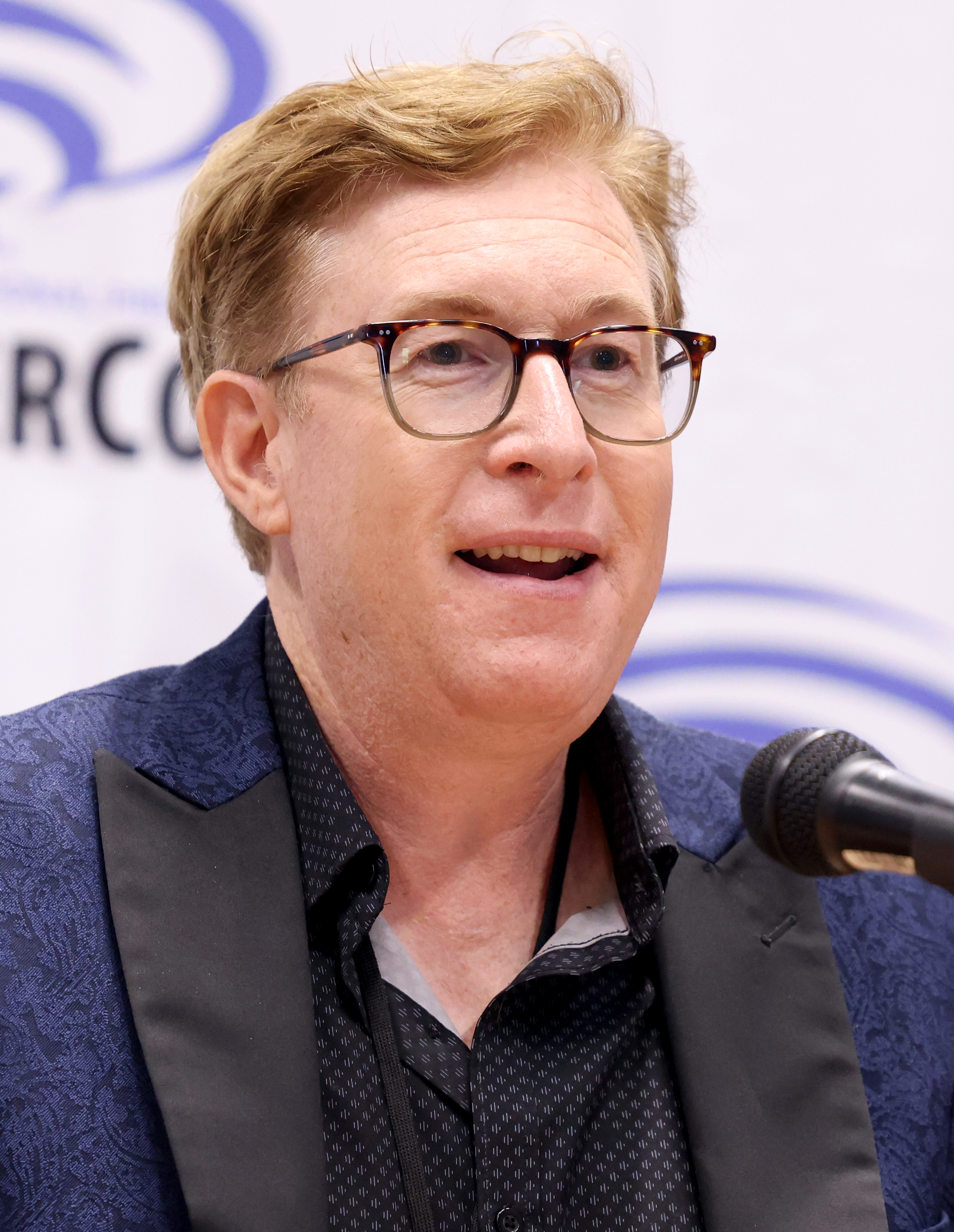
- Allport in 2025
- Born: Christopher M. Allport; August 23, 1977 (age 49); Burbank, California, U.S.
- Occupations: Author; Actor; filmmaker; singer; composer; dancer; producer

Christopher M. Allport (born August 23, 1977) is an American filmmaker, actor, singer, author and composer. He has been active in the entertainment industry since 1986.

== Career ==
In his early career, Allport portrayed characters for Disney, Warner Brothers and Amblin Entertainment. He was the voice of Tootles the Lost Boy, in Fox Children's Network Peter Pan and the Pirates, for which he received both a 1991 Young Artist Award nomination, and a 1992 Young Artist Award win. In Steven Spielberg's Hook, Allport dubbed the crowing sounds for Robin Williams when William's character begins flying and realizes that he really is Peter Pan. In 1993, Allport provided additional voices for the movie Hocus Pocus, including re-voicing the role of the black cat, Binx. Later on as an adult he played a pirate that was singing on the way to the gallows in the opening scene of Pirates of the Caribbean: At World's End, and he also appears on the movie soundtrack in the song "Hoist the Colors".

In 2000, Allport sang as a back-up singer to Barbra Streisand in her Timeless: Live in Concert Tour concert at Staples Center in Los Angeles. That same year, he also served as a talent producer for the 2000 Democratic National Convention at Staples Center. In 2008, Allport released a duet single of David Foster's "The Prayer" with duet partner Ariana Richards.

In 2009, he directed The Bilderberg Club, a pilot that he created with collaborative partner, Julia Diana Alexander, a fictional expose of the shadow one world government.

On August 29, 2010, Allport performed his new live show "Living the Dream" at Sterling's Upstairs at Vitellos.

On January 15, 2012, Allport directed the motion picture and live broadcast of the Young Musicians Foundation Gala featuring conductors Michael Tilson Thomas, Joey Newman and John Williams.

Allport co-authored Senja Chronicles: A Scandinavian Action Adventure Novel with Fansu Njie, which was published in 2023.

=== Literary Works ===
- Senja Chronicles (co-Author with Fansu Njie). Published by Alpha Command Unit Press.
- Now Act!: Insight, Advice and Preparation Processes from Actors, Coaches and Casting Directors (contributing Author) edited by Laurie Lamson. Published by JaZzyMaE Media.

=== Filmography ===
- Peter Pan and the Pirates (1990) TV series (Voice)
- Recycle Rex (1993) (Voice)
- Clueless (18 episodes, 1996–1997) (TV) (Voice)
- Dawson's Creek (1 episode, 1999) (TV)
- Absolutely True (2000) (TV) episodes)
- Rocket Power (1 episode, 2001) (TV) (Voice)
- Boston Public (1 episode, 2001) (TV)
- Pirates of the Caribbean: At World's End (2007)
- The Bilderberg Club: Meet the Shadow One World Government (2009) (Writer/Director/Producer)
- All the Sins of the Past (2009) (Writer/Director/Producer)
- Tristan und Isolde (2010) filmed live at The Broad Stage, Santa Monica, CA (Motion Picture Director / Producer)
- Amahl and the Night Visitors (2010) filmed live at The Pasadena Playhouse, Pasadena, CA (Motion Picture Director / Producer)
- 57th Annual Young Musicians Foundation Gala (2012) filmed live at The Dorothy Chandler Pavilion, Los Angeles, CA (Motion Picture Director / Producer)
- From Manzanar to the Divided States of America (2016) Documentary (Director)
- Emily or Oscar (2022) Romantic Comedy (Director)
- Waterloo (2026) (Music Video): Lindsay Deutsch and Take3 Trio

=== Discography ===
- Ganas with Rogelio Resendiz (soundtrack producer, arranger, conductor and studio vocalist)
- Music from the Martian Gras, by Toulouse Engelhardt (Five & Dime Universe Inc. 2026) - Christopher M. Allport, mastering engineer.
- Three Novellas for Guitar and Orchestra, by Toulouse Engelhardt (Five & Dime Universe Inc. 2023) — Christopher M. Allport, music director.
- Song of Solomon (2017) classical wedding composition for orchestra, organ and two voices voice – recorded by Hollywood Chamber Orchestra (Chris M. Allport, Composer / Singer)
- Oh Shenandoah (2017) classical arrangement for piano, cello, flute and voice: — recorded by John Dickson, Leah Metzler, Sara Andon and Chris M. Allport (Chris M. Allport, Arranger, Singer)
- Arise, Awake o Christmas Day (suite) (2016) classical composition for chamber orchestra and choir — recorded by Hollywood Chamber Orchestra (Chris M. Allport, Composer)
- The Lord's Prayer (2016) classical composition for chamber orchestra and choir — recorded by Hollywood Chamber Orchestra (Chris M. Allport, Composer)
- The Prayer (2008) by David Foster, Carole Bayer Sager, Alberto Testa and Tony Renis. (Duet vocalist with Ariana Richards)
- Zoro in Hell with Culture Clash (soundtrack performer and recording producer)
- The SF: Mexican Bus Mission Tour (2006) with Culture Clash (guest vocalist, character voices and technical producer) with Richard Montoya, Ric Salinas and Herbert Sigüenza.

=== Soundtrack performances ===
- Hook (1991)
- The Mighty Ducks (1992)
- D2: The Mighty Ducks (1994)
- Mr. Holland's Opus (1995)
- Pirates of the Caribbean: At World's End (2007)
- Godzilla (2014)

== Activism ==
Allport had been a youth representative for the Screen Actors Guild.

In 1999, he testified before legislative panels in California and New York on the need for statutory protection for child actors' earnings. He did this with Paul Petersen, founder in 1990 of A Minor Consideration, a nonprofit group devoted to protecting and advancing the interests of child actors. In 2002, he was appointed by Melissa Gilbert, then President of the Screen Actors Guild, as the national chair of its Young Performers Committee, a joint committee with the American Federation of Television and Radio Artists, co-chaired by Paul Petersen.

== Awards and nominations ==
- 1992, Won Young Artist Award for 'Outstanding Young Voice-Over in an Animated Series or Special' for Peter Pan and the Pirates
- 1994, Won Young Artist Award for 'Best performance by a Young Actor'
- 1995, Won Young Artist Award for 'Best Professional Actor/Singer'
- 2011, Won Park City Film Music Festival 'Gold Medal for Excellence,' 'Life is too Short to Sing Badly'
