= The 3 Wise Men =

Los Reyes Magos
- Theatrical release poster
- Directed by: Antonio Navarro
- Screenplay by: Juan Ignacio Peña; Juanjo Ibáñez; Steve Hughes (English adaptation); Javier Aguirreamalloa
- Produced by: Eduardo Campoy; Claude Carrère; Fernando Martín Sanz
- Music by: José Battaglio; Caelo del Río
- Production companies: Animagicstudio; Carrere Group D.A.; Telemadrid
- Distributed by: United International Pictures
- Release date: 19 December 2003
- Running time: 76 minutes
- Country: Spain
- Languages: English; Spanish
- Budget: €7,000,000
- Box office: $2,823,810

Los Reyes Magos (The 3 Wise Men in the United States) is a 2003 Spanish animated film. It tells the story of the visit of the Magi to the baby Jesus and the wrath of Herod. The film was directed by Antonio Navarro, who was nominated for a Goya Award for this film. The film contains the voice talents of José Coronado, Juan Echanove and Imanol Arias in the original version and the voice acting of father-son actors Martin Sheen and Emilio Estevez in the English dub.

== Summary ==
A bright star guides Melchior, Gaspar, and Balthazar toward a treasure meant for the unborn King of Kings. To make the three wise men's quest even more difficult, King Herod's evil counselor, Belial, is among them in disguise, trying to sabotage their mission!

== Plot ==
Jimmy, a boy disillusioned about Christmas, visits his uncle Alfredo at his shop, who recounts the Nativity Story with a different point of view.

In ancient times, Herod the Great with his advisor Belial are searching for the Royal Treasures. Meanwhile, three powerful Magi – Balthazar, Gaspar, and Melchior – follow the Star of Bethlehem after its light shines upon them, hoping to find the King of Kings (Melchior hopes for it to lead him to a Valley of Gold). They cross paths in a small village, saving the villagers from bandits and rescue a young revolutionist Sarah, who joins them on their journey. Herod finds out about this and he and Belial arrange Tobias, son of late general Jason, to act as a spy.

In Judea, the Magi visit Herod, the latter requesting have them return when they find the child so in secret he can kill him. One of his advisers, Baruch, reveals their destiny: they are to find the royal treasures consisting of gold, frankincense, and myrrh, and bring them to newborn baby Jesus, warning them of Herod and Belial's scheme. They are chased by the palace guard. Tobias helps them escape and gets wounded. They are forced to let him come along as they head for the City of Salt along the Dead Sea. Belial has Tobias lure them to Black Crow Canyon, but the group manage to escape his spells.

The group manage to get along during the journey, where Sarah and Tobias stumble upon a slavery mine. Sarah reveals that when she was young, Herod ordered all of the villagers and one of his generals executed because they offered slaves sanctuary. Before she could reveal the general's name, she is bitten by a scorpion and falls ill. The magi find the city and uncover the Temple of Ashta. Tobias turns his back on Herod when the general is revealed to be his father.

Inside the temple, each magi is tested and finally given a treasure when they pass them. Herod's forces arrives as the moon blocks out the sun; however, the henchmen disintegrate and the temple conceals itself once the magi exit as the surviving soldiers flee. Belial transforms into a gigantic monster. Eventually, they are able to defeat him in the same manner King David defeated Goliath, destroying the enchanted moon and blinding Belial as he falls to his death. Herod gives them an ultimatum: the treasures or Baruch's life. Herod is soon defeated and Melchior punishes Herod with coal. In the end, they reach Bethlehem and offer the treasures to the newborn baby Jesus.

Back in modern times, Jimmy received a visit from the Three Wise Men. He is given Aristobulus, Sarah's kangaroo rat.

== Cast ==
Characters	English voice actor (Telson)	Spanish voice actor (Europe)	English voice actor (Disney)	Spanish voice actor (Latin America/Disney)
Gaspar	Mark Newsom	José Coronado	Martin Sheen	Martin Sheen
Melchior	José Luis Martinez Guitérrez	Juan Echanove	Marcos Witt	Marcos Witt
Balthazar	Gary Anthony Stennette	Imanol Arias	Unknown	Lupillo Rivera
Sara	Doris Cales	Mar Bordallo	Jaci Velasquez	Angélica Vale
Tobias	Steve Emerson	David Robles	Kuno Becker	Kuno Becker
Belial	Steve Hughes	José Luis Angulo	Emilio Estevez	Emilio Estevez
Herod	Craig Stevenson	Javier Gurruchaga	Richard Montoya	Unknown
Jimmy	Mark Romeo	Ricardo Gómez	Eddy Martin	Eddy Martin
Alfredo	Luis Iganacio Gonzalez	José Sancho	José Luis "El Puma" Rodríguez	José Luis "El Puma" Rodríguez
Baruch	Mark Newsom	Iñaki Gabilondo	Unknown	Unknown
Midas	Christiane Kroll	Jon Arias	Christiane Kroll	Unknown
Bandit Chief	Jeff Espinoza	Pedro Tena	Herbert Siguenza	Unknown
Fire Angel	Steve Emerson	José Luis Gil	Ric Salinas	Unknown
The Star	Thisbe Burns	Mercedes Cepeda	Thisbe Burns	Unknown

== Home media ==
Buena Vista Home Entertainment would acquire the US distribution rights to the film in August 2005, and then signed a store-exclusivity deal with Wal-Mart. The film was officially released on DVD on 1 November 2005 under the Walt Disney Home Entertainment banner. It contains a newly-produced English dub alongside a Latin American Spanish dub with much of the same cast.

== See also ==
- List of Christmas films
