= Moritz von Stuelpnagel =

American theatre director

Moritz von Stuelpnagel is an American theatre director. Newsday has described him as, "best known for having staged blasphemous hand puppets" in Hand to God, for which he was nominated for a Tony Award for Best Direction of a Play in 2015.

== Life and career ==
Von Stuelpnagel's parents emigrated from Germany to the United States in 1975. He attended Boston University College of Fine Arts School of Theatre before receiving a Masters in Fine Arts from Rutgers Mason Gross School of the Arts, Theatre Division.

From 2009 to 2015, he served as the Artistic Director of Studio 42, an Off-Off-Broadway theater company whose mission was to produce plays they deemed "unproducible".

Critic Terry Teachout of The Wall Street Journal wrote of Von Stuelpnagel's work, "[His] 2015 Broadway staging of Hand to God proved him to be a master of stage comedy, physical and otherwise." Hand to God garnered five Tony Award nominations in 2015, including Best Direction of a Play. Von Stuelpnagel directed the 2016 production of Hand to God in London's West End at the Vaudeville Theatre where it was nominated for a Laurence Olivier Award for Best New Comedy.

In 2017, he directed a Broadway revival of Noël Coward's Present Laughter starring Kevin Kline, which was nominated for a Tony Award for Best Revival of a Play.

In 2018, von Stuelpnagel directed the premiere on Broadway of Theresa Rebeck's Bernhardt/Hamlet starring Janet McTeer.

== Notable works ==
| Year | Title | Playwright | Producer |
|---|---|---|---|
| 2008 | The Most Lamentable and Tragical Historie of the Barber-Surgeons | Timothy Charles Browne | Studio 42 |
| 2015 | Verité | Nick Jones | Lincoln Center Theatre/LCT3 |
| 2015 | Hand to God | Robert Askins | Booth Theatre |
| 2015 | Tiger Style! | Mike Lew | Alliance Theatre |
| 2015 | Important Hats of the Twentieth Century | Nick Jones | Manhattan Theatre Club |
| 2016 | Hand to God | Robert Askins | Vaudeville Theatre |
| 2016 | Romance Novels for Dummies | Boo Killebrew | Williamstown Theatre Festival |
| 2017 | Present Laughter | Noël Coward | St. James Theatre |
| 2018 | Seared | Theresa Rebeck | Williamstown Theatre Festival |
| 2018 | Teenage Dick | Mike Lew | Public Theatre |
| 2018 | Bernhardt/Hamlet | Theresa Rebeck | Roundabout Theatre Company |
| 2023 | The Thanksgiving Play | Larissa FastHorse | Playwrights Horizons, Broadway |
| 2023 | I Need That | Theresa Rebeck | Roundabout Theatre Company |
| 2024 | Judgment Day | Rob Ulin | Chicago Shakespeare Theater |
