= Heather McDonald (disambiguation) =

Heather McDonald (born 1970) is an American actress, comedian and author.

Heather McDonald or Mac Donald may also refer to:

- Heather McDonald (playwright) (born 1959), American playwright, director, librettist, and professor
- Heather McDonald (rugby union), Canadian rugby union player
- Heather Mac Donald (born 1956), American political commentator, essayist, and attorney
