= Hero (1992 film) =

1992 film directed by Stephen Frears

- Theatrical release poster
- Directed by: Stephen Frears
- Screenplay by: David Webb Peoples
- Story by: Laura Ziskin; Alvin Sargent; David Webb Peoples
- Produced by: Laura Ziskin
- Starring: Dustin Hoffman; Geena Davis; Andy García
- Cinematography: Oliver Stapleton
- Edited by: Mick Audsley
- Music by: George Fenton
- Distributed by: Columbia Pictures
- Release date: October 2, 1992
- Running time: 112 minutes
- Country: United States
- Language: English
- Budget: $42 million
- Box office: $67 million

Hero (released in the United Kingdom, Ireland, and Australia as Accidental Hero) is a 1992 American comedy-drama film directed by Stephen Frears, from a story written by David Webb Peoples, Laura Ziskin, and Alvin Sargent, and written by Peoples. It stars Dustin Hoffman, Geena Davis, Andy García, and Joan Cusack. Following The Grifters (1990), it was the second American feature film by British filmmaker Frears.

== Plot ==
Bernie LaPlante is a pickpocket and petty criminal who anonymously rescues survivors, including television reporter Gale Gayley, at an airplane crash. At the same time, he also steals her purse, losing a shoe in the process. After his car breaks down, he flags down John Bubber, a homeless Vietnam War veteran, and tells him about the rescue at the crash site, giving him his remaining shoe. When Gale's television station news director, Deke, offers $1 million to the "Angel of Flight 104", Bernie realizes he can't claim the reward, due to his arrest while fencing credit cards he stole from the people he rescued. John contacts Gale, recounting Bernie's tale of the rescue, and provides the single shoe to take credit for the selfless act.

When Bernie tries to tell people that John is a fake, the media, after sensationalizing his heroic image, will not believe him. He is released from jail, and his lawyer, Donna O'Day, informs him that he will be heading to prison soon because of the stolen goods he carried in his apartment. Gale, as one of the crash survivors, considers herself to be in John's debt, and soon grooms his public image. She finds herself falling in love with him, even though she has questions about his authenticity. Despite his reluctant acceptance of his fame, he turns out to be a decent person, using his fame and reward money to help sick children and the homeless.

John finds himself in an ethical dilemma, as his persona is inspirational to countless people. Meanwhile, Bernie continues to aggravate his ex-wife, Evelyn, and fails to bond with their son, Joey, who is now enamored with John. He begins to feel that if Joey is going to idolize anyone, perhaps John is the better choice.

Inspector Dayton, a police detective, tells Gale her credit cards were recovered during Bernie's arrest. She and her cameraman, Chucky, break into Bernie's apartment with the help of Winston, the landlord. While searching for evidence to incriminate him, Gale finds a stolen Silver Microphone Award she won in New York City the night before the crash. He arrives, only to be confronted by her, as she speculates that John stole her purse in a moment of weakness during the rescue, sold it to Bernie, and accuses him of attempting to now blackmail John. They are interrupted by Winston, who says John is on television, about to commit suicide by jumping from the ledge of a high-rise skyscraper.

Gale rushes to the scene and brings Bernie along, threatening to have him prosecuted if John jumps to his death. She demands he apologize for the attempted blackmail. Evelyn and Joey rush there as well, with Evelyn reminiscing about how Bernie is selfish and cynical, but always becomes a great person in a crisis. He goes out on the ledge, hatching a scheme to milk the media attention for all its worth. He convinces John that the world needs a hero and that he is clearly the right one for the job, although he does negotiate a discreet share of the $1 million to pay for Joey's college tuition, as well as a letter to Judge Goines to put in a good word for him to suspend his prison sentence. When Bernie slips off the ledge, John grabs him and pulls him to safety, a (true) hero once more. When Gale sees his face covered with dirt, as on the night of the crash, she realizes it was he who saved her. She confronts him "off the record" with her supposition, but he insists that John was the hero.

As Gale leaves, she thanks Bernie for saving her life. He reflexively replies, "You're welcome." She tells him to tell Joey the truth. John agrees to continue playing the part of a public hero. While on an excursion to the zoo, Bernie decides to tell Joey the true story of the crash. After he does so, a lady cries out that her daughter has fallen into the lion's cage. Joey pleads with him to help, to which he sighs, slips off his shoes, and heads off to see what he can do.

== Cast ==
- Dustin Hoffman as Bernie LaPlante
- Geena Davis as Gale Gayley
- Andy Garcia as John Bubber
- Joan Cusack as Evelyn LaPlante
- Kevin J. O'Connor as Chucky
- Maury Chaykin as Winston
- Stephen Tobolowsky as James Wallace
- Christian Clemenson as James Conklin
- Tom Arnold as Chick
- Warren Berlinger as Judge Goines
- Cady Huffman as Leslie Sugar
- Susie Cusack as Donna O'Day
- James Madio as Joey LaPlante
- Richard Riehle as Robinson
- Daniel Baldwin as Denton
- Lee Wilkof as Prosecutor
- Leslie Jordan as Court Official
- Richard Montoya as Vargas
- Herbert Sigüenza as Espinosa
- Don S. Davis as Patrick Duke
- Darrell Larson as Freddy King
- Harry Northrup as Mr. Fletcher
- Kate Butler as Makeup Artist
- Kevin Jackson as Inspector Dayton
- Lance Kinsey as Paramedic
- Michael Talbott as State Police Officer
- Marita Geraghty as Joan
- Martin Starr as Allen
- Jeff Garlin as News Vendor
- Jay Leggett as Mud Face Wannabe
- William Newman as Millionaire
- Clea Lewis as Sylvia
- Henry Brown as Hospital Guard
- James Callahan as Police Chief
- Barney Martin as De Taglio
- Edward Herrmann as Jeffrey Broadman
- Fisher Stevens as Director
- Chevy Chase as Deke
- Robert Munns as Doctor

Several prominent performers appear uncredited, most prominently Chevy Chase as Deke, the Channel 4 news director. Edward Herrmann appears as suicide victim Jeffrey Broadman, Barney Martin appears as De Taglio, a court official, Jeff Garlin appears as a news vendor, and Fisher Stevens appears as a Channel 4 director.

== Production ==
The pivotal scene in the film involved an airliner crashing with 54 passengers and crew trapped aboard.

Principal photography on the film began shooting October 30, 1991, in Chicago with studio work at Sony Pictures Studios in Culver City, California, and Los Angeles, California, along with the crash scene on-location in Piru, California. Filming wrapped March 20, 1992. Screenwriter David Peoples was hired to write the screenplay that had been envisioned by producer Laura Ziskin and Alvin Sargent.

The colossal staging of a crashed Boeing 727 airplane in December 1991 involved creating a complete location set in Piru, California. The derelict fuselage was blown up over a bridge and a recreated river and riverbed. After the failure of the first explosion, a second rigged explosive realistically recreated the crash scene in which the plane is torn apart.

Epic Records approached Mariah Carey to record a song for the film's soundtrack but her then-fiancé and CEO of Sony Music Entertainment Tommy Mottola did not want Carey doing anything associated with film at the time, thinking it would harm her career. Carey's label Columbia Records also did not want Carey appearing on an album from another label, despite it being released by a branch of their parent company Sony. Instead, Carey agreed to write a song for the film intended to be recorded by Gloria Estefan. Carey and Walter Afanasieff then wrote the song "Hero" but after completing the demo, it was decided that she would keep the song for her album Music Box, with some of the lyrics rewritten. Luther Vandross wrote, produced and performed the song "Heart of a Hero" for the film's soundtrack instead, which featured members of the Los Angeles Children's Chorus.

== Influences ==
Hail the Conquering Hero is a film with a similar theme by Preston Sturges. Many reviewers referred to the obvious similarities between Hero and Sturges's screwball comedies. The classic Frank Capra film Meet John Doe was also cited as a model for Laura Ziskin, who both produced and supplied the story for Hero.

== Reception ==
=== Box office ===
In the United States and Canada, the film grossed $19.5 million. Internationally, it grossed $47 million, for a worldwide total of $67 million. Columbia lost $25.6 million on the film.

=== Critical response ===
On Rotten Tomatoes, the film holds a 68% rating, based on 22 reviews. On Metacritic, it has a weighted average score of 61 out of 100, based on reviews from 25 critics, indicating "generally favorable" reviews. Audiences surveyed by CinemaScore gave the film an "A−" on a scale of A+ to F.

Kenneth Turan of the Los Angeles Times wrote, "Haphazard and erratic, involving only in fits and starts, Hero's core is nevertheless so shrewdly and gleefully cynical about public heroism and the cult of celebrity it is impossible not to be at least sporadically amused and entertained."

Roger Ebert of the Chicago Sun-Times noted, "It has all the ingredients for a terrific entertainment, but it lingers over the kinds of details that belong in a different kind of movie. It comes out of the tradition of those rat-a-tat Preston Sturges comedies of the 1940s, and when Chevy Chase, as a wise-guy TV boss, barks orders into a phone, it finds the right note."

Desson Howe of The Washington Post said, "If a hero is one who perseveres and never gives up, this is one Hero that should have quit when it was ahead."

== Home media ==
The film debuted at number 3 in the U.S. home media market. It was released on VHS April 15, 1993. Another version presented in widescreen was also released on VHS.

A DVD was released May 25, 1999, and was re-released in 2004 by Sony Pictures. Special features for the 1999 DVD included liner notes and theatrical trailers. The 1999 DVD was also a double-sided disc, presented in widescreen (side A) and fullscreen (side B). The only special feature for the 2004 DVD includes theatrical trailers, and was presented only in fullscreen. Mill Creek Entertainment acquired the DVD distribution rights for the film.

The DVD was released again in 2012 with no special features, and presented in widescreen with an aspect ratio of 1:85.
