= Ric Salinas =

Salvadoran-American actor, writer, producer

- Born: May 31, 1960 (age 66); El Salvador
- Education: San Francisco State University
- Occupations: Actor, writer, producer
- Known for: Culture Clash

Ric Salinas (born May 31, 1960) is a Salvadoran–American actor, writer and producer. He is known for co-founding the comedy group Culture Clash with Richard Montoya, Herbert Siguenza and Jose Antonio Burciaga. He is currently working with the remaining two members, Herbert and Richard, on the production "Culture Clash (Still) in America". As of 2012, he resides in Los Angeles.

== Early life ==
Salinas was born on May 31, 1960, in El Salvador. When he was a child his family moved to California and settled in the Mission District of San Francisco. Growing up in the inner city, Salinas was surrounded by gang violence and was shot trying to break up a fight. He went on to study communications at San Francisco State University, graduating first with a degree in broadcasting. Salinas then went on to get a second degree in speech communications. He describes his involvement in theater as an "accident". As a result he performed in theater productions throughout college and was a member of Teatro Latino. He also spent time breakdancing and rapping bilingually (in Spanish and English).

== Career ==
=== Culture Clash ===
Culture Clash established the foundation for Salinas' career. Salinas told Philip Kan Gotanda, "Back then there weren't very many Salvadoreños in the Mission District or in San Francisco, so I gravitated towards the Chicano movement,". He also says, "I was doing teatro and it was all kind of angry, political theatre -sometimes a little bit too dogmatic,". This interest in the Chicano/Latino experience combined with his involvement in theater and performing led to the meeting of the fellow members of Culture Clash (originally called Comedy Fiesta). The group formed with the aim of illuminating Latino experiences with humor and satire.

=== Solo career ===
Apart from Culture Clash, Salinas has acted in several plays and films, such as the 2014 play Placas: The Most Dangerous Tattoo by Paul S. Flores. The play follows the redemption of ex gang member, Fausto Carbajal, as he goes through the process of removing gang tattoos as well as fostering a relationship with his son.

Salinas also starred in a one man show called '57 Chevy by Cris Franco (2015). It's a comedic play that follows the immigration of a family from Mexico to California, all in a '57 Chevy. Upon making the decision to do this play, Salinas says, "Another reason I decided to do this play is I got tired of all the immigrant bashing, insinuating there’s this sinister plot that immigrants are going to come here to destroy America. Cris’s play is an immigrant story that displays just how this country works at its best,".

Salinas has been in several films and TV shows throughout his career. He has acted in the films Encino Man, Hero, Mi Vida Loca, Camera Obscura, The 3 Wise Men, Culture Clash in AmeriCCa, Larry Crowne, and Lola's Love Shack. He has also appeared in the tv shows/shorts Great Performances, In Living Color, Culture Clash, Frank's Book, and Stunted.

== Legacy ==
Salinas' personal and professional papers are housed at the California State University, Northridge (CSUN) Special Collections and Archives in the University Library.
