= Water & Power =

- Theatrical release poster
- Directed by: Richard Montoya
- Written by: Richard Montoya
- Produced by: Richard Montoya; Mark Roberts
- Starring: Enrique Murciano; Nicholas Gonzalez; Clancy Brown
- Cinematography: Claudio Chea
- Edited by: Juan Garza
- Music by: Gingger Shankar
- Production companies: Olmos Productions; SunCast Entertainment; Roberts/David Films; North / South Pictures
- Distributed by: AMC Theatres
- Release dates: June 7, 2013 (NALIP); May 2, 2014 (United States)
- Running time: 88 minutes
- Country: United States
- Language: English

Water & Power is a 2013 American crime-drama written and directed by Richard Montoya and starring Enrique Murciano, Nicholas Gonzalez, Clancy Brown, and Yvette Yates. The film is set in Latino-centric Eastside Los Angeles and was adapted from a stage play by Culture Clash.

== Premise ==
Twin brothers nicknamed "Water" and "Power" from the Eastside streets of Los Angeles rise through the city's political and police ranks to become players in a complex and dangerous web of the powerful and corrupt of Los Angeles.

== Cast ==
- Enrique Murciano as Gilbert aka "Water"
- Nicholas Gonzalez as Gabriel aka "Power"
- Clancy Brown as Turnvil
- Yvette Yates as Amy
- Emilio Rivera as Norte / Sur

== Production ==
Water & Power began as a play by Montoya, premiering at the Mark Taper Forum in 2006.

It was shown at the National Association of Latino Independent Producers (NALIP) National Conference in June 2013, the Los Angeles Latino International Film Festival in October 2013, and was given a US theatrical release on 2 May 2014.
