= Peter Pan & the Pirates =

1990 American television series

- Genre: Adventure; Fantasy; Cartoon
- Based on: Peter Pan by J. M. Barrie
- Written by: Peter Lawrence; Chris Hubbell; Larry Carroll; David Carren
- Voices of: Jason Marsden; Tim Curry; Chris M. Allport; Jack Angel; Michael Bacall; Adam Carl; Debi Derryberry; Linda Gary; Ed Gilbert; Whitby Hertford; Tony Jay; Josh Keaton; Christina Lange; Aaron Lohr; Jack Lynch; Scott Menville; David Shaughnessy; Cree Summer; Eugene Williams; Michael Wise
- Composers: Sam Winans; Reg Powell; Paul Buckmaster; Bill Reichenbach Jr.
- Countries of origin: United States; Australia; Japan
- Original language: English
- No. of seasons: 1
- No. of episodes: 65

Production
- Executive producer: Buzz Potamkin
- Editors: Don Christensen; Hiroshi Ohno (TMS)
- Running time: 22 minutes
- Production companies: Fox Children's Productions; Southern Star Productions (Note: Animation outsourced to AKOM Production Company, Dai Won Animation, Haksan Animation, Hinton Animation, Island Animation, Pacific Rim Productions, Pion Animation, Tae Sang Animation, Take One Animation Co., Ltd. and Wang Film Productions Co., Ltd.); TMS Entertainment (Note: Also credited as Tokyo Movie Shinsha Co., Ltd.)

Original release
- Network: Fox (Fox Kids)
- Release: September 8, 1990 – September 10, 1991

Fox's Peter Pan & the Pirates (known in international markets as 20th Century Fox's Peter Pan & the Pirates) is an American animated television series based on J.M. Barrie's Peter Pan that aired on Fox Kids from September 8, 1990, to September 10, 1991. 65 episodes were produced. The show was one of Fox's first forays into programming for children.

Ownership of the series passed to Disney in 2001 when Disney acquired Fox Kids Worldwide.

== Plot ==
A disclaimer states that this show is independent from the book. It tells the story of Peter Pan, Tinker Bell, the Darlings, and the Lost Boys as they constantly take on Captain Hook and the rest of the Jolly Roger crew.

== Characters ==
=== Protagonists ===
- Peter Pan (voiced by Jason Marsden) is the protagonist of the series and the leader of his group.
- Tinker Bell (voiced by Debi Derryberry) is a fairy and Peter Pan's sidekick. Her fairy dust allows humans and animals to fly, but has other abilities, like making fire or light.
- Wendy Darling (voiced by Christina Lange) is the oldest of the Darling siblings.
- John Darling (voiced by Jack Lynch) is the middle Darling sibling.
- Michael Darling (voiced by Whit Hertford) is the youngest of the Darling siblings.
- The Lost Boys are a group of six boys who got orphaned or lost. They only remember their life in Neverland. Their clothes are informal and they all wear caps shaped from various animal heads.
  - Nibs (voiced by Adam Carl) is one of the tallest and the eldest of the Lost Boys. He has light golden blond hair and wears a cap shaped like a bear's head with the face cut out. He is Peter's second-in-command and leads the group when Peter is away.
  - Slightly (voiced by Scott Menville) is the tallest and second eldest Lost Boy. He has pale skin, honey blond hair and wears a cap in the shape of a parrot's head. As a reference to his name, he constantly uses the word "slightly" in his sentences and regularly the others when talking to him use it, too.
  - Curly (voiced by Josh Keaton) is a hispanic Lost Boy with a cap shaped like a tiger's head with the face cut out. He has a tanned complexion and caramel brown hair. Age-wise, he is in the middle of the Lost Boys.
  - The Twins (voiced by Aaron Lohr and Michael Bacall) are two Lost Boys who are biracial twins. They are not identical, aside from both wearing caps in the shape of a leopard's head with cut-outs in the front for their faces. Individually and only in the written language, they are known as Tall Twin and Short Twin, their heights being the main distinction. The other notable difference is their color, Tall Twin having dark skin and black curly hair and Short Twin having light skin and straight ginger hair. When one of them starts speaking, the other almost always finishes the sentence.
  - Tootles (voiced by Chris M. Allport) is the youngest and smallest of the Lost Boys who wears a cap in the shape of a panda's head with face cut-out and has a black blotch around his left eye. He is very small and has a round stomach, because he loves eating.

=== Antagonists ===
- Captain James Algernon Cloudesley Hook (voiced by Tim Curry) is the main antagonist of the series and Peter Pan's nemesis. He is the captain of his pirate crew. His right hand is missing and he has a sharp iron hook in its place. Despite his fears of being killed and eaten by the crocodile, he does not fear death by any other means.
  - Smee (voiced by Ed Gilbert) is Captain Hook's first mate.
  - Short Tom is a malicious parrot and Captain Hook's pet who wears an eye patch. He is capable of speaking, but is limited to phrases taught to him.
- The Jolly Roger Crew are a group of pirates, several aged, whose home address is the Jolly Roger.
  - Robert Mullins (voiced by Jack Angel) is a member of the Hook's crew who hails from Brooklyn. He is medium height, muscular, has a long face, a moustache and a scar at his left eye. Mullins is very good in sword fight.
  - "Gentleman" Ignatious P. Starkey (voiced by David Shaughnessy) — A foppish yet gentlemanly and English member of Hook's crew. He speaks with a "dash-it-all" accent, has a high physique, long black hair he wears in a ponytail and a thin moustache. He wears a long cape and as a weapon uses a rapier.
  - Alf Mason (voiced by Tony Jay) is member of Hook's crew who serves as a carpenter and strongman. He has a strong physical build, is tall, very muscular, has no hair, and wears a blue nightcap. As a weapon, Alf often wields a mallet.
  - Billy Jukes (voiced by Eugene Williams) is the youngest pirate who is of Old World/Indian descent. Before he became a member of the pirates, he was a castaway on a desert island. Billy was rescued by Captain Hook's crew and taught pirating by Robert Mullins, to whom he is very loyal. He also has a wide knowledge at machines and other uncommon instruments and is the inventor among the pirate crew, what is a big feature he has in common with the Twins.
  - Eucrates Cookson (voiced by Jack Angel) is the ship's chef who has his individual method for his dishes and menu. Instead of typical weapons, he can use kitchen devices and is very good at using a fishing net. Cookson spends most of his time in the kitchen, where he can be seen cooking.
- The Croc is a crocodile that had devoured Captain Hook's hand. She lives in her cave shaped like a crocodile's head and does not tolerate any kind of intruders. A ticking clock is heard every time the Croc is near. In the series, the clock is magical and controls the whole time of day in Neverland.
- Captain Patch (voiced by Ed Gilbert) is James Hook's older brother, real name Jasper Hook, who once served as his midshipman. When he died at some point, his ghost resides in a chest that is part of his loot.

=== Other characters ===
- The Indians are a tribe of Native Americans who reside in Neverland and often help out Peter Pan and the Lost Boys. Only three of them figure prominently in the series.
  - Great Big Little Panther (voiced by Michael Wise) is the Indian chief and father of Tiger Lily and Hard-To-Hit. He is very wise and often assists Peter and his friends when they have problems.
  - Tiger Lily (voiced by Cree Summer) is the daughter of Great Big Little Panther and big sister of Hard-To-Hit. She and her little brother sometimes tag along with and aid Peter and their other friends on their many adventures. She is physically active and regularly finds it unnecessary to take a risk, showing she is more mature. Together with her brother, they love having fun. However, they also know and recognize when the situation is more serious and act in a more mature way.
  - Hard-to-Hit (voiced by Aaron Lohr) is Great Big Little Panther's son and Tiger Lily's younger brother. He knows the weapons of his tribe and how to use them. Generally, he gets accompanied by his sister and is less mature, but even though it is all obvious for him to treat her more gentle as a girl. He can become very stubborn and then just want to reach his goal no matter what!
  - Spirit Guide is a panther that is invoked by Great Big Little Panther to guide Peter during the storm to recover the magic sand.
  - Little Panther is an ancestor of the Native Americans who once took care to calm down the argument of the sun and the moon and their chaos of day and night this two creatures had caused.
- The Mermaids are a group of young women, who are half human-fish hybrids. They live in the Mermaids' Lagoon.
  - The Mermaid Trio are three mermaids, two brunettes with dark skin, where one has a dark pink and the other a violet fishtail and one mermaid with light skin, short strawberry blonde hair and cyan fins. They all care for Peter and like playing around only with him, the other humans they don't accept. They love to dress themselves up with shining jewels.
  - Crooked Tail (voiced by Linda Gary) is a mermaid who was once beautiful but conceited and haughty, until a potion to enhance her beauty went horribly awry turning her into a green-skinned mustached mermaid. She is friendly not only to Peter, but also likes the other humans. Crooked Tail has a very determined personality why other strong individuals have no chance to resist against her. That's why she is feared by the Purple and Blue Mermaids.
  - The Blonde and Redhead Mermaids are two mermaids who only appear twice as villains in the series. While they are usually seen together, they often insult each other and both are very vain.
- Alde Baran is a white dwarf who works with miniature-horses and has magical boots.
- Olook (voiced by Jack Angel) is a troll who lives in a large cave with a secret entrance.

== Episodes ==
No.	Title	Written by	Storyboard by	Original release date	Prod. code
1	"Coldest Cut of All"	Karen Willson and Chris Weber	Don Christensen	September 8, 1990	01
King Kyros's Ice Realm is one area of Neverland where Peter Pan is unwelcomed. But the arrogant and reckless boy is not about to let a grumpy ice god spoil his fun. Peter takes an ice crystal from the ice caves and returns home to share his treasure and adventurous tale with Wendy, Tink and the Lost Boys. His friends will also be sharing his punishment when Kyros retaliates...
2	"Living Pictures"	George Hampton, Mike Moore, Larry Carroll, David Carren	Don Christensen	September 17, 1990	07
Peter and the boys always liked listening to Wendy's stories, which she writes and reads. There Tinker Bell knows something better. She uses her magic to make the contents of story books real, so that everybody can take part in the action.
3	"River of Night"	Brynne Stephens, Michael Reaves	Don Christensen, George Hampton	September 18, 1990	03
Peter joins Hard-to-Hit and Tiger Lily in a journey down the Mysterious River to seek out an ancient gold arrow. Hook and the Pirates pursue them through a series of perils along the way. Every group has its own methods to go through the obstacles, that are on the way.
4	"Slightly in Stone"	Lawrence DiTillio	Don Christensen	September 19, 1990	06
Tink has a magic powder she bought from Olook, the troll and wants to try it out on berries. It's too heavy for her, so it falls out of her hands and gets in touch with Slightly, turning him into stone. Now Peter, Wendy, and the Lost Boys must scavenge Neverland for the supplies needed to cure Slightly.
5	"The Rake"	Peter Lawrence and Michael Reaves	Don Christensen	September 20, 1990	23
Peter, Slightly and John accidentally open a box that contained the Ghost of Captain Patch (AKA Jasper Hook), who raises his ship called the Rake and plans his revenge on his younger brother, Captain James Hook for blinding him years ago. Now Captain Hook must work together with Peter Pan in order to defeat Captain Patch.
6	"Peter on Trial"	Larry Carroll, David Carren	Don Christensen	September 27, 1990	08
Peter and Tink sneak on board the Jolly Roger in order to play with Hook's harpsichord. Hook catches them in the act and captures Peter, destroying his beloved instrument in the process. All looks more ominous for Peter before Wendy flies over and convinces Hook to give Peter a trial.
7	"The Wind and the Panther"	Charles Kaufman, Larry Carroll, David Carren	TBA	October 17, 1990	10
Hook tampers with Great Big Little Panther's magic sand, which can create and control the weather, sending the weather of Neverland into a frenzy. Peter must retrieve this property before the storms where Hook created to kill anyone.
8	"Treasure Hunt"	Peter Lawrence	TBA	November 1, 1990	04
In the early morning, Peter appears on the Jolly Roger and annoys the pirates. This makes Hook going insane, that he draws up a bogus treasure map in order to lure Peter and the Darlings into a trap and to take revenge on them.
9	"Plucking of Short Tom"	George Hampton, Mike Moore	TBA	November 5, 1990	21
Short Tom leaves the Jolly Roger and makes good friends with Tink. Smee knows how important this parrot is for his Captain, so that he takes some of the pirates to the land to get the pet back, while the others, who stayed on the ship, must busy Hook, not to let him notice, what'd happened. Unfortunately, he finds out that his beloved Short Tom is missing and decides to take care of this problem by himself. This could be dangerous for Peter's friend …
10	"The Dream"	Peter Lawrence	TBA	November 7, 1990	25
Michael keeps having a strange nightmare about the Crocodile and a red eagle, which just cannot stop and only chases him. It's up to Peter and the Darlings to find out what it means and stop it for good. The Indian chief gives them advice they start to follow. Unfortunately Hook wants to interfere as usual.
11	"Demise of Hook"	Larry Carroll, David Carren	TBA	November 8, 1990	35
Peter and the Lost Boys cause a commotion among the pirates when they steal the Jolly Roger's flag. In trying to retaliate, Hook puts too much gunpowder into Long Tom and gets blown to smithereens. The rest of the pirates decide to leave Neverland since their captain's argument with Peter was the only thing that kept them there. Peter is devastated that Hook is dead and that the pirates are gone means that there will be no more fun fighting Hook and his pirates. Peter is being selfish about this, but he may just get one last showdown with his archenemy when the Lost Boys tell him that Hook's ghost now haunts a cave. Revealing that Hook fake his death. Peter is relief that he can have more fun facing him.
12	"Pirate Boys, Lost Men"	Sam Graham, Chris Hubbell	TBA	November 9, 1990	31
In the middle of the night, the Lost Boys are hunting a bear, while the Pirates want to steal a magic crystal. Because both of this targets are located on the same place, at the same time, it's not possible for the two parties to converge with each other and then to go through the unpleasant consequences.
13	"After the Laughter"	Sean Roche	TBA	November 13, 1990	18
The jealous Mermaids of the Lagoon capture Wendy and tickle her laughter out of her. This disturbs the spirit of Cavern Wherever in the process. Now Peter and Wendy must journey into the Cavern under the lagoon and get Wendy's Laugh back, before she is destroyed, encountering Hook's lost childhood in the process.
14	"Stupid Smee"	Sam Graham, Chris Hubbell	TBA	November 16, 1990	19
Hook is displeased with Smee, who cannot do anything right and finally expulses him. Now Smee is left to fend for himself and soon Wendy begins feeling with him. She tries to befriend him and to persuade Peter and the Lost Boys to help him, as it'd be better not only for Smee, but also for themselves.
15	"The Play's the Thing"	Sam Graham, Chris Hubbell	TBA	November 19, 1990	49
While searching for Peter Pan's hideout, the pirates spy the Lost Boys rehearsing a Shakespeare play in the woods. Hook is so appalled by their wrong recitations that he steps out of hiding and wows everyone with a flawless rendition of a soliloquy from Julius Caesar. Everyone then agrees on a temporary truce so that Hook can direct a production of Romeo and Juliet starring Wendy as Juliet. It's a tense truce that threatens to turn deadly when Hook decides to use the play's sleeping potion as a way to poison Wendy.
16	"Hook's Mother's Picture"	Peter Lawrence, Tony Zalewski	TBA	November 23, 1990	43
Up in the sky Wendy builds a cloudstatue that represents her mother. The Lost Boys get curious, as they don't know what a mother is. To let them know Peter decides to go to the Jolly Roger to take a look at a portrait of Hook's mother, so they'd at least know how a real mother looks like. As the boys really want to know this, they don't care about the danger there and go with Peter. Being careful, they get to Hook's cabin and fulfill the quest. To make things funnier, Peter steals the picture. The pirates try to replace it, which causes confusion over which is the real picture.
17	"A Wee Problem"	Michael Reaves	TBA	November 26, 1990	02
Everyone is astonished at the appearance of three moons above Neverland. Tinker Bell is especially thrilled, for this gives her the ability to shrink Peter down to fairy size and take him to visit the Fairy King. But she's not too happy when Peter insists that the Darlings and the Lost Boys come along. Tink messes with the others' ability to fly, which leads to such disaster that King Oberon kicks Wendy and the boys out. With the children unable to revert to their former size, they become easy prey for the pirates and the Crocodile, especially since Tink is keeping Peter distracted.
18	"Knights of Neverland"	William Overgard	TBA	November 27, 1990	09
Peter and the others are playing one of Wendy's stories, King Arthur and the Knights. For the game, they are all wearing heavy armor, which makes them unable to fly. At the same time Wendy remembers that she had a dream of a wolf, named Nico which turns out to be real. Soon this wolf gets kidnapped by the Pirates. Despite the difficulty and danger without flying, three of the Lost Boys try to rescue the animal, but don't succeed and (literally) get hung up by the Pirates. Wendy then tries to free them all in a more female way, by talking and staying calm, but also this is without any effect, so she gets tied up as well. Finally, Peter comes to save the day with the help of the rest of the Boys and Tink's fairy dust. At the end he can (literally) hang up Hook and the Pirates and rescue his friends and the wolf. Wendy is happy nothing bad happened to Nico. She cares for his freedom, so the two of them say goodbye to each other.
19	"Pirate Shadows"	William Overgard, Peter Lawrence	TBA	November 28, 1990	16
While playing Michael gets frightened by a shadow, that he cannot calm down. Peter means he doesn't have to as shadows are peaceful and would never hurt anybody. In the same night, he steals the Pirates' shadows. Unfortunately, they are more dangerous than he realizes. Soon they become independent and begin to try and do Peter in. With the loss of their shadows, the Pirates are unable to walk normally and must do so on their hands. The only way to make everything normal again is for the Pirates' to return along with their shadows. But not necessarily everybody has to be connected to his own ...
20	"Now Day Party"	Sean Roche	TBA	December 17, 1990	27
Michael wishes to celebrate his birthday and Wendy decides to fulfill this. Everybody agrees and is ready to help and take part. Everybody except Peter. He is against birthdays, as they mean to get older and finally to grow up. The only way not to celebrate this birthday is not to allow the next day to come is to keep the night lasting. He takes the girl from the Moon down to the Earth and makes everything to her liking so that she doesn't want to return to the Moon, which sticks unmoved in the sky.
21	"When Games Become Deadly"	William Overgard	TBA	December 18, 1990	29
Peter and the others are having a lot fun by playing games. Suddenly they get disturbed by a new cannon developed by the Pirates. The Twins find that interesting and decide to fight back with their own inventions. However, Peter sees that Hook has begun to change the rules the two groups have between each other. As calling himself the one who always wins, Peter knows that he must go on with the idea of the Twins, so they can make the last attack.
22	"Eternal Youth"	Sam Graham, Chris Hubbell	TBA	December 20, 1990	26
Peter makes Hook and his crew believe that there is a magic river in Neverland with water that can make everyone and everything younger. First Hook is sure this all is only a stupid joke, but finally he tries it out on his own parrot, Short Tom, and sees the results the next day. He wants Smee to take him to the place where he got this magic water. He doesn't know that Peter has his own plans in store.
23	"The Foot Race"	Chris Trengove, Peter Lawrence	TBA	December 24, 1990	24
Peter and Wendy are playing hide and seek with Tiger Lily and Hard-to-Hit. A "No Flying" rule is in place to give the Indians a fair chance, but Peter breaks the rule in order to win the game. Hard-to-Hit becomes angry about this and claims that Peter could not win anything without his flying power. This brings about a contest in which an earth-bound Peter and Wendy race Hard-to-Hit and Tiger Lily in retrieving several artifacts around Neverland. Unfortunately, the competitive boys make each round more dangerous since there is never a clear winner to the race, so that finally Hook gets attentive.
24	"Nibs and the Mermaids"	William Overgard	TBA	December 31, 1990	40
Nibs decides to journey to the bottom of the lagoon in order to see the Mermaids' Grotto.
25	"All Hallow's Eve"	Sam Graham, Chris Hubbell	TBA	January 4, 1991	60
It's All Hallows Eve, so Peter and the Lost Boys are playing tons of pranks on the pirates. One prank they pull is to steal the pirates' lantern. This revives the Jack-o-Lantern ghost, who gets Smee to steal the lantern back from Peter. The ghost then summons other ghosts, witches, and goblins from the volcano to wreak havoc all over the island. At first, Hook and the crew think Smee is a deserter and hunt him down, but when they learn about the ghost they realize their mistake. The pirates and the Lost Boys must team up if they're to reclaim the lantern before Neverland is completely overrun by the undead!
26	"Billy Jukes, Lost Boy"	Doug Booth	TBA	January 7, 1991	38
When Robert Mullins comes down with Neverfever and Billy Jukes goes after him in order to find a cure, Slightly tries to prove himself to the others by capturing them. Only for the three of them to be caught in a thunderstorm. While taking refuge in a cave and planning to find the antidote needed to cure Robert, Slightly learns about Billy and Robert's past.
27	"The Phantom Shaman"	Chris Trengove and Peter Lawrence	TBA	January 9, 1991	36
Cookson poses as a shaman in order to lure Peter and Wendy to their doom.
28	"Tootles and the Dragon"	Bruce Schaefer	TBA	January 14, 1991	22
Peter and the boys find a giant magic key that is stuck in Dragon's Rock. After everyone's failure to wrestle it free, Tootles touches it and makes the stone come alive.
29	"First Encounter"	Ted Lederson, Steven Waves	TBA	January 26, 1991	62
John is in an inquisitive mood today and wants to know how certain events in Neverland came to pass. Peter begins answering John's questions by stating why he made the Croc swallow the clock. He then describes how the Jolly Roger was brought to Neverland by a strange hurricane and how the Lost Boys and the pirates first met. During the course of the story, Peter reveals that he cut off Hook's hand when he thought that the pirate had killed Nibs and Tootles in their first battle. The flashbacks show that Hook's scream of pain could be heard all over the island as a signal that life in Neverland would never be the same.
30	"Slightly Duped"	Larry Carroll and David Carren	TBA	January 31, 1991	41
Slightly visits the "oracle" of Neverland wishing to be Peter's second in command, which he is eventually agreed to. After being much too naive and getting tricked first by his friends, as a joke, and later by the pirates, more seriously, he causes a lot of trouble for everybody and finally realizes he's not qualified for the position. Note: The Darling children did not appear.
31	"Professor Smee"	Matthew Malach	TBA	February 1, 1991	47
Smee finds a big shell, which tells him everything he wants to know. This can be the big chance for Hook to find out the home of Peter and the others.
32	"Evicted!"	Lawrence Hartstein	TBA	February 2, 1991	63
A small, stone gnome in a closet of the Underground House suddenly comes to life and orders the Lost Boys to leave, by threatening to tell Hook about their living place.
33	"The Girl Who Lives in the Moon"	Sean Roche	TBA	February 4, 1991	05
Robert Mullins's quest to cure his land sickness with a magical spell causes the moon to plummet from the sky. Hook saves the girl, who is lived in the moon and becomes fully enchanted by her beauty and charm. In an attempt to prove to Peter that not all children dislike him, Hook tries to win the Girl's affections by convincing her he wants to help put the moon back in the sky. Somehow, Peter must get the Girl away from the pirates and return her home to the proper place.
34	"Hook's Christmas"	Sam Graham, Chris Hubbell	TBA	February 5, 1991	12
Captain Hook believes that Christmas is a waste of time even after he crashes his crew's Christmas party and locks himself in his cabin for the remainder of the evening. He is then visited by the Ghost of Christmas Past (who resembles Wendy), Ghost of Christmas Present (who resembles Smee), and Ghost of Christmas Future (who resembles Captain Patch) who end up teaching him the meaning of Christmas. A parody of Charles Dickens A Christmas Carol.
35	"Tootles the Bold"	Sam Graham, Chris Hubbell	TBA	February 6, 1991	37
Tootles wishes to be the hero of a great adventure, but is a bit scared not to be qualified for that. Tink helps his courage with a 'talisman' and Tootles makes friends with a whale family.
36	"The Hook and the Hat"	Larry Carroll, David Carren	TBA	February 7, 1991	48
Peter takes the hat from Hook and suddenly thinks to be the Captain himself. Disappointed of the big defeat Hooks leaves the Jolly Roger and now the Pirates have to look after themselves. Mullins decides to become the new Captain and tries to take back the pirate's hat from Peter, but due to his landsickness he is too weak to fight outside the ship, so Peter beats him and soon has the control of the pirate crew and the Jolly Roger, where he moves with the Boys. Wendy knows this won't end good so she decides to find Hook, who she wants to return and bring everything back to normal.
37	"Ages of Pan, Part One"	Peter Lawrence, Matthew Malach	TBA	February 8, 1991	32
After Hook taunts Peter with the fact that the boy will never grow up, Peter decides to prove his nemesis wrong by wishing he would grow up. However, as Peter ages, his belief in magic slowly fades away, causing all of Neverland to fade away as well. Note: Both parts of this episode were originally released commercially to all markets throughout North America as "Hook's Deadly Game".
38	"Ages of Pan, Part Two"	Peter Lawrence, Matthew Malach	TBA	February 9, 1991	51
As Neverland continues to fade away, Hook and the Pirates succeed in capturing Wendy and the Lost Boys, and the now elderly Peter. As the fantastic creature in Neverland, which is the closest to Peter Pan, Tinker Bell is now the only one who can help Peter renew his belief and trust in magic.
39	"The Ruby"	Lawrence Hartstein	TBA	February 11, 1991	46
The Purple and Blue Mermaids steal a map of Crooked Tail's and give it to the Pirates in order to lure Peter into the ocean. Both, Peter and the Pirates are set on finding the ruby and claiming it for themselves.
40	"Friday the Thirteenth"	Sam Graham, Chris Hubbell	TBA	February 12, 1991	20
Peter and Curly play tricks on the Pirates, making them believe they have bad luck.
41	"Immortal Pan"	Sean Roche	TBA	February 13, 1991	53
Tired of Hook's obsession to destroy Peter Pan, the Pirates make a deal with Tinker Bell to trick Hook into thinking that Peter is immortal.
42	"Lost Memories of Pirate Pan"	Sean Roche	TBA	February 14, 1991	14
After bringing a young girl named Jane (who is revealed to be Wendy's daughter from the future) into Neverland, Peter is suddenly stricken with amnesia and joins Hook's pirates as "Pirate Pan". Wendy, Jane, and the Lost Boys must head to the Cavern of the Fairy Forget-Me-Not to collect all of Peter's memories and save their friend.
43	"Dr. Livingstone and Captain Hook"	Larry Carroll, David Carren	TBA	February 15, 1991	28
Hook gets hit at his head and suddenly thinks that he is the big scientist, David Livingstone. The next day, he makes a journey with his pirate crew, to explore the place and find another tribe. Unfortunately, they get too close to the place where Peter and his friends live. Now it's up to children to protect their home. They all must take part in the game to entice the pirates away not to let them discover the location of their underground house.
44	"Vanity, Thy Name is Mermaid"	Matthew Malach, Jennifer Louden	TBA	February 16, 1991	59
While playing with two mermaids in the lagoon, Peter innocently claims that Wendy is the most beautiful being in Neverland. The two mermaids get jealous and later capture Wendy where they slowly turn her into a mermaid minus the ability to breathe underwater. When Peter goes underwater to rescue Wendy, he ends up getting the unlikely help of Crooked Tail. Note: Hook did not appear.
45	"The Great Race"	Larry Carroll, David Carren	TBA	February 18, 1991	15
The Twins have build a new machine that shall be the fastest vehicle on the land. While testing it they have an accident and each one of them tells the other he'd have seen some unsolved mistakes. This conflict soon evolves into a big argument. In order for this to end, Peter and the others decide to plan a race, which will bring the two together again.
46	"Curly's Laugh"	Sean Roche	TBA	February 19, 1991	39
After Curly pours a bunch of water on Peter and his friends as a joke, Peter tells him that he's not funny. Curly then asks if Tinker Bell if she couldn't change this with her magic. Tinker Bell does so and warns him not to do and use it while she's around. Every time he speaks, Curly's friends blow up into laughter. Meanwhile, Captain Hook is trying to plan a play, but he can't find the right comedian who can make him laugh for it.
47	"Mardi Gras"	Sam Graham, Chris Hubbell and Tony Zalewski	TBA	February 20, 1991	52
Peter and the Lost Boys honor a cease-fire with the pirates after Hook "rescues" Michael from the Croc. They go together to Mardi Gras to have fun with each other, but the pirates have different plans in store ...
48	"The Never Ark"	Larry Carroll, David Carren	TBA	February 21, 1991	65
When Smoky Top begins to rumble menacingly, Peter and the Lost Boys go to see Great Big Little Panther for help. However, the shaman has gone on a retreat, so Hard-to-Hit attempts shaman magic to call forth a vision of what is to come from the sacred flames. He deciphers that Neverland is about to be destroyed. Peter sets about warning everyone in Neverland while the Lost Boys evacuate the Underground House. Wendy brings up the fact that not all the animals can fly away, so Peter decides that Hook's ship will have to suffice as an Ark to carry the animals to safety.
49	"The Croc and the Clock"	Bennett McClellan	TBA	February 22, 1991	44
The sun is rising and setting so fast that no one can keep track of what time it is. Tink and the Lost Boys figure out that the clock inside the Crocodile has stopped ticking and that fixing it will put time back to normal. But first they have to get the clock from the cranky Croc; that's not easy now that the animal is free to stalk its prey undetected. Captain Hook, the beast's favorite victim, learns this the hard way.
50	"Three Wishes"	Sean Roche	TBA	February 23, 1991	54
Peter eagerly awaits the passing of a shooting star so that he can be granted three wishes. But Hook hears about the star's magic and recites the rhyme to call its power at the same time as Peter. The two enemies decide to split their wishes, each getting one and a half, but the half wishes are granted first and don't turn out quite right. When the adventure takes a mortal turn for Hook, Peter uses his full wish to make sure the entire thing never happened.
51	"A Hole in the Wall"	Matthew Malach	TBA	April 20, 1991	34
Peter and the Darling children find a parallel universe in Neverland with an Egyptian theme. Will they escape or be enslaved like their Egyptian counterparts?
52	"Hook the Faithful Son"	Peter Lawrence, Charles Kaufman	TBA	April 25, 1991	42
Peter tricks Hook into thinking his mother wanted him to be a pilot, instead of a pirate.
53	"Wendy and the Croc"	Sam Graham, Chris Hubbell	TBA	April 26, 1991	13
Wendy wants to know how it is like to be a fairy. Tink decides to give her the possibility, when suddenly, during the transformation the Croc interferes.
54	"Elementary, My Dear Pan"	Sam Graham, Chris Hubbell, and Jim Carlson	TBA	April 27, 1991	57
While Wendy is reading The Hound of the Baskervilles to Peter and the others, Peter finds out his pan flute has gone missing. It's then up to "Sherlock Pan" and "Dr John Watson" to solve the case.
55	"Frau Brumhandel"	Matthew Malach	TBA	April 29, 1991	11
Michael awakens Frau Brumhandel, a monstrous, Valkyrie-like operatic nymph who has the ability to enslave others with her music. Frau Brumhandel joins the pirates and falls in love with Captain Hook, on whom the magic singing has no influence.
56	"Play Ball"	Sam Graham, Chris Hubbell, and Ken Vose	TBA	April 30, 1991	33
Captain Hook comes across Peter and the Lost Boys playing baseball and overhears them talking about stealing 'bases'. Believing they are talking about 'bases' in alchemy, he demands to play against them. The game begins once Great Big Little Panther, the only person that both sides consider fair and trustworthy, agrees to serve as the umpire. The pirates perform their usual acts of trickery and cheating in order to win the game. In the end, Hook succeeds in stealing all the bases but is highly disappointed when he tears them apart and learns they are worthless.
57	"Jules Verne Night"	Peter Lawrence, Matthew Malach	TBA	May 1, 1991	45
Peter and the Lost Boys wish to explore the depths of the sea while Hook tries to fly to the moon.
58	"The Pirate Who Came to Dinner"	Larry Carroll, David Carren	TBA	May 6, 1991	55
Hook injures himself while trying to capture Peter Pan and Wendy insists they take care of him until he's well again. When Hook learns from the gnome doctor that he has been misdiagnosed and is well after all, he pretends to be still injured in order to trap Pan.
59	"The Neverscroll"	Larry Carroll, David Carren	TBA	May 7, 1991	30
Peter and the Lost Boys discover the Neverscroll, a magical map which holds the fate of Neverland in its parchment. Hook steals the Neverscroll and decides to erase Neverland from the map, which will destroy Peter if left unchecked.
60	"Peter in Wonderland"	George Hampton, Mike Moore	TBA	May 8, 1991	64
After John writes his own adaptation of Alice in Wonderland, Peter and Wendy, with a little help from Tinker Bell's magic, are thrown into the book's pages to live the adventure within, with everyone else in Neverland, including Hook and the pirates, as the other characters.
61	"A Day at the Fair"	Matthew Malach	TBA	May 13, 1991	17
Michael goes to a place where everybody in Neverland comes to have fun. When the pirates join in, he decides with Tink to pull some pranks. Note: Peter did not appear.
62	"Count de Chauvin"	William Overgard, Peter Lawrence	TBA	May 14, 1991	50
A mysterious swordsman appears and challenges Peter to a duel...and wins!
63	"Seven League Boots"	Sam Graham, Chris Hubbell	TBA	May 27, 1991	61
The pirates steal a pair of magical boots that will grant the wearer's wish.
64	"Invisible Tootles"	Lee Schneider	TBA	September 9, 1991	58
At the underground house nobody listens or even notices Tootles, so he begins talking about himself being invisible, which results in it really coming true.
65	"The Letter"	Larry Parr	TBA	September 10, 1991	56
Starkey thinks his mother is going to visit him on the Jolly Roger.

== Crew ==
- Michael Bell – Voice Director
- Lee Dannacher – Voice Director
- Tony Pastor – Voice Director

== Broadcast ==
Prior to the series’ broadcast, on July 9, 1990, Fox made a presentation to television writers about their upcoming Fall season line-up.

The series aired on Fox from September 8, 1990, to September 10, 1991. Reruns continued to air until September 11, 1992. A rerun of the series' Christmas episode aired on December 25, 1993. The series was run on Fox in a rerun form on weekday mornings from November 4, 1996, to March 28, 1997. Reruns were then shown on Fox Family in 1998.

== Home releases ==
=== VHS ===
Select episodes from the series were released on video in 1992. Titles included:

==== United States ====
Release name	Release date	Classifaction	Publisher	Format	Language	Subtitles	Notes	Ref
Peter Pan & the Pirates – Ghost Ship	July 2, 1992	G	Fox Video	NTSC	English	None	23 minutes	
Peter Pan & the Pirates – Demise of Hook	July 2, 1992	G	Fox Video	NTSC	English	None	23 minutes	
Peter Pan & the Pirates – Hook's Deadly Game, Part 1	July 2, 1992	G	Fox Video	NTSC	English	None	23 minutes	
Peter Pan & the Pirates – Hook's Deadly Game, Part 2	July 2, 1992	G	Fox Video	NTSC	English	None	23 minutes	

==== United Kingdom ====
Release name	Release date	Classifaction	Publisher	Format	Language	Subtitles	Episodes	Notes	Ref
Peter Pan and the Pirates (Vol 1)	10 August 1992	U	Fox Video	PAL	English	None	Episodes 18, 42 & 13		
Peter Pan and the Pirates (Vol 2)	10 August 1992	U	Fox Video	PAL	English	None	Episodes 5, 50 & 63		
Peter Pan and the Pirates (Vol 3)	5 April 1993	U	Fox Video	PAL	English	None	Episodes 17, 8 & 53		
Peter Pan and the Pirates (Vol 4)	5 April 1993	U	Fox Video	PAL	English	None	Episodes 22 36 & 54		
Peter Pan and the Pirates (Volume 1)	23 August 2004	U	Maximum Entertainment	PAL	English	None	Episodes 1, 3, 8, 17 & 33	66 minutes	

=== DVD ===
Select episodes were released on a single DVD for the UK market in 2004. Episodes released included:

DVD Title	# of Disc(s)	Year	Series	Episodes	DVD release		
DVD Title	# of Disc(s)	Year	Series	Episodes	Region 1 In France, a box set of the entire first half of the series was released up to Ages of Pan, Part Two.	Region 2	Region 4
Peter Pan and the Pirates (Volume 1)	1	1990	1	1, 3, 8, 17 & 33	—N/a	30 August 2004	—N/a
Peter Pan and the Pirates	3	1990	1	Unknown	—N/a	—N/a	—N/a
Peter Pan and the Pirates (Volume 2)	1	1990	1	4, 18, 53 and some other	—N/a	—N/a	—N/a

== Video game ==
A video game titled Peter Pan and the Pirates was released for the Nintendo Entertainment System by third party publisher THQ. The game was generally received poorly by critics.

In this single player side-scrolling action game, the player controlled Peter Pan, who could collect bags of fairy dust to fly and wielded a sword that boasted a short range. The player began out in the forest and was required to destroy all the pirates in each level to advance to the next, with the last goal of reaching the pirate ship and battling Captain Hook.

== Comics ==
In addition to the TV show a German imprint Bastei-Verlag, inter alia with the Turkish comic book artist Yalaz, released seven comics. They are originally in German and tell new stories of the Fox's Peter Pan and his closest friends.

=== Titles ===
The main titles of the comics and their stories, all with English translation:

1. Rettung für das Einhorn – Peter saves the Unicorn

- Ein Piratenschiff geht fliegen – A Pirates' Ship takes Flight (note: a remake from the episode "The Rake")
- Sturm über dem Niemalsland – Stormy Neverland
- Tinkerbell sitzt in der Falle – Tink is trapped

2. Das tickende Krokodil – The tickling Croc

- Wer andern eine Grube gräbt ... – Who digs a pit for others ...
- Die Jagd nach dem goldenen Stein – Hunting the golden Stone
- Captain Hook geht baden – Captain Hook goes swimming

3. Captain Hook und der Zauberring – Captain Hook and the Magic Ring

- Captain Hook und der Zauberring – Captain Hook and the Magic Ring
- Angeltour mit Hindernissen – Go fishing with obstacles
- Reise in die Vergangenheit – Journey to the Past
- Die verzauberte Statue – The enchanted Statue

4. Die Hexe mit dem grünen Daumen – The Witch with the green Thumb

- Die Hexe mit dem grünen Daumen – The Witch with the green Thumb
- Alles wegen Ingwerbeeren – All 'coz of the Ginger Berries
- Verrat im Nilpferdreich – Betrayal at the Hippopo-Empire
- Tootles auf Abwegen – Tootles goes astray
- Der falsche Peter – The wrong Peter

5. Die Hexe lässt das Blitzen nicht – The Witch who did not stop Lightning

- Die Hexe lässt das Blitzen nicht – The Witch who did not stop Lightning
- Der Heiratsschwindler – The Wedding Swindler
- Captain Hook hat Schwein – Hook and his Guinea Pigs
- Ein Pirat und ein Gentleman – A Pirate and a Gentleman
- Zaubern will gelernt sein – Doing Magic is to be learned

6. Ein Ehrengast zieht Leine – A Special Guest goes away

- Ein Ehrengast zieht Leine – A Special Guest goes away
- Ein Monstervogel muckt auf – Rebel of a Monster Bird
- Der Piratenausverkauf – Pirates' Sale
- Captain Hook geht in die Falle – Hook gets trapped
- Eis und heiß im Niemalsland – Hot'n Cold in Neverland

7. Viel Radau beim Mädchenklau – Making this much Noise, the Girl has no Choice

- Viel Radau beim Mädchenklau – Making this much Noise, the Girl has no Choice (note: story without Hook)
- Ein Möhrchen zum anbeißen – To get a Nibble from the Carrot
- Der Stein der vom Himmel fiel – The Stone from Sky (note: story without Hook)
- Rettung für die Streithähne – Rescue of the Squabblers
- Freitag der dreizehnte – Friday the Thirteenth (note: not to be mistaken with the episode from the series)

== See also ==
- Peter Pan
