= Cecilia Burciaga =

American educator (1945–2013)

Cecilia Preciado de Burciaga (May 17, 1945 – March 25, 2013) was a Chicana scholar, activist and educator. Burciaga worked for over twenty years at Stanford University where she was the "highest ranking Latino administrator on campus." She advocated for the university to hire more women and people of color when she was a high-ranking administrator at Stanford. She was also extremely committed to enrolling more Chicano students, especially in graduate studies. Burciaga served on the National Advisory on Women with President Jimmy Carter and for President Bill Clinton as a member of the White House Initiative on Educational Excellence for Hispanic Americans. An award named after her and her husband, José Antonio Burciaga, is given at Stanford to students who show significant contributions to the community.

== Biography ==
Burciaga was born in Pomona and grew up in Chino. Her parents were Mexican immigrants who ran a dairy farm. Her mother encouraged her to read, rather than do housework. She graduated from Pomona Catholic High School in 1963.

Burciaga first taught at the high school level as a Spanish teacher in Chino.

Burciaga started working at Stanford in 1974. Part of her initial job was to help increase the number of Mexican Americans attending Stanford and working as staff and faculty. Within three years, she had been promoted to assistant provost of faculty affairs based on her successful recruitment of Mexican Americans. In this position, she helped recruit more minority and women faculty members. In 1977, Burciaga is a speaker at the 1977 National Women's Conference among other notable speakers including Rosalynn Carter, Betty Ford, Lady Bird Johnson, Bella Abzug, Barbara Jordan, Audrey Colom, Claire Randall, Gerridee Wheeler, Gloria Steinem, Lenore Hershey and Jean O'Leary. In 1980, she became assistant to the university president and provost for Chicano affairs. During the 1980s, in an interview, she discussed how even though affirmative action was part of the mission of Stanford, there was apathy and a general attitude that there were no "qualified candidates" among minority groups. In 1991 she was promoted to associate dean. Burciaga was not only an administrator at Stanford, she also facilitated Chicano and Latino students' integration into campus life.

Burciaga was laid off from Stanford University in 1994, due to budget cuts said the then provost, Condoleezza Rice. Stanford students were so incensed by her lay-off that they staged protests and hunger strikes. The hunger strikes took place in May and lasted between four and five days.

In 1994, she became a founding dean of Cal State University, Monterey Bay. She worked as an administrator there for many years. In 2002, the university settled on a lawsuit brought by Burciaga and two others, citing racial discrimination as to the cause. The settlement established a $1.5 million scholarship fund for low-income students from California.

She died in Stanford, California on March 25, 2013, of lung cancer.
