= Judgment Day (Ulin play) =

Judgment Day is a play by Rob Ulin. The play made its world premiere, starring Jason Alexander and directed by Moritz von Stuelpnagel, in April 2024 at the Chicago Shakespeare Theater in Chicago.

== Synopsis ==
An attorney who is motivated to shape up after a near-death experience reveals he’s not headed for heaven.

== Productions ==
The play was originally presented as a virtual reading on Zoom during the COVID-19 pandemic in 2021. It officially premiered on April 24, 2024 at the Chicago Shakespeare Theater.

== Original cast ==
Role	Actor	Ref
Sammy Campo	Jason Alexander	
Tracy	Maggie Bofill	
Father Michael	Daniel Breaker	
Angel	Candy Buckley	
Della	Olivia Denise Dawson	
Jackson	Joe Dempsey	
Monsignor	Michael Kostroff	
Casper	Ellis Myers	
Edna	Meg Thalken	

== Reception ==
David Finkle, in the New York Stage Review, described the play in its virtual reading format as "perversely lovable and compact".
