= Monica Palacios (playwright) =

American playwright and performer

- Born: San Jose, CA, U.S.
- Citizenship: United States
- Education: San Francisco State University, BA Chico State University
- Occupations: Playwright, solo performer, director, lecturer, stand-up comic
- Writing career
- Language: English, Spanish, Portuguese, French, German
- Years active: 1982-Present

Monica Palacios is a Chicana lesbian American playwright and performer, specialising in Chicana, queer, feminist, and lesbian themes. She has charted the intersection of queer and Latina identities in Latinx communities, with their mutually marginalising impact. A trailblazer stand-up comedian in the 1980s and 1990s, Palacios is now better known for her work as an award winning playwright and activist. Her works are taught in many schools and colleges, where she has served frequently as a director of student theatre.

== Background ==
Palacios attended Chico State University and transferred to San Francisco State University, at which she earned a BA in Cinema with a concentration in screenwriting. She has been producing theatre works for over three decades. In her specifically Chicana, queer, feminist, and lesbian performances, Palacios emphasizes activism and community organizing. She combines aspects of race, culture, and sexuality in her performances, and she was one of the first openly lesbian/queer stand-up comics in 1982 in San Francisco. She has created several one-woman shows, plays, and screenplays.

Her poems, plays, and anthologies are taught in universities and examined in scholarly settings, usually in the fields of LGBTQ Studies, Chicano Studies, and Feminist Studies. Palacios works with students of a wide range of ages (from elementary students to college students) and has served as a writer, director, and dramaturge for over 400 student theatre works.

== Early life ==
Born and raised in San Jose, California, Chicana lesbian comic Monica Palacios was one of six children and, according to Palacios herself, had a stable childhood. Her older sister also came out as a lesbian later in life, a subject that eventually became a bit of Palacios’ titled “Double Dyke Familia.”

She attended an all girls Catholic school where her love of comedy was already visible. She loved to watch sitcoms and stand up comedians on TV and would try to imitate them for her classmates. She even tried doing stand-up in her high school English classes.

After high school, she attended Chico State University where she began to question her sexuality, however at the time, she had a boyfriend. Although she didn't love him, she thought about marrying because she thought it might just make her life easier. But she eventually broke up with him and came out as bisexual. As she continued to dig into her sexual identity, she knew she needed to “get the hell out of dodge” and at age nineteen Palacios transferred to school in San Francisco, came out as a lesbian, and began performing stand-up.

== Stand-up career ==
=== The 1980s: Early stand-up career ===
Palacios “discovered her love for comedy and her sexual identity at the same time.” When she got to school in San Francisco, she hung out in comedy clubs and “took notes.” Then, on her twenty third birthday she went on stage as a dare to herself.

At the beginning of her career, she didn’t want to do lesbian content, she thought it would ruin her dreams of having a mainstream comedy career before it even started. In an interview, Palacios stated that she was “ a novelty back then in 1982 because I was a 23-year-old California native Chicana comic and a lesbian, to boot! Being very in your face about nationality and sexuality, I was called "controversial" and other names that begin with a 'C'.”

Although she first performed at straight comedy clubs, which were known for being harshly racist, sexist, and homophobic, she quickly found herself performing at popular Queer performance venue The Valencia Rose Cabaret.

=== The Valencia Rose Cabaret ===
Palacios first went at the Queer establishment, which was founded in 1982 and was the first gay comedy club in the country, just to watch other stand-ups perform. But found herself on stage “almost immediately” and “she was hooked.” She describes the venue as a “big love fest” where she felt fully comfortable to be herself

Palacios had first performed at a straight comedy club to a tepid audience response. But, a few nights later she found herself at The Valencia Rose. She did the same set she had done at the straight club, but she added a bit about her girlfriend and the audience exploded with laughter. The Valencia Rose was a place where comics felt relief from the typical, straight clubs.

After three months of performing at the Valencia Rose Cabaret, she began getting paid to headline there. An experience she describes as “incredible and empowering.”

=== The 1990s: Transitioning to one woman shows ===
Though she quickly made a name for herself as a lesbian comic, she found that this “closed as many doors as it opened. Straight clubs wouldn’t let her perform and in 1987 she headed to Los Angeles where she, once again, attempted to become a mainstream performer. But it was a “rerun” of what had happened in San Francisco with straight clubs not being accepting or welcoming to her.

The more time she spent in comedy clubs, the more she started to dislike them, as she thought they had an “aggressive atmosphere.” This caused her to leave and write her first solo show, “Latin Lezbo Comic.” In the performance, she sought to put a positive example of a queer woman on stage. She told stories about her family and her girlfriends, and the show marked the start of her career as a playwright and one woman show performer.

Though she attempted to make her work relatable, she refused to compromise who she was for profit. For example, Palacios noted that “sure I’ll go on Arsenio if I can talk about my girlfriend.” She was known for subverting the white, heteronormative storytelling that is common in stand-up comedy. As her career continued to grow, she also became known for her one woman shows which bridged not only her identities, but also theatrical form as her performances lived in a world somewhere between theater and stand-up.

== Themes and influences ==
The majority of Palacios' writing is about her interpretations of her experiences throughout life as a queer, Chicana woman. She draws inspiration from her family and others close to her. As one of the first comedians in this genre, she often discusses the intersection of queer and Latina identities that develop a liminal identity for people who are marginalized for more than one aspect of their existence.

Her work is known for being unapologetically queer, despite the homophobia that had permeated Latinx communities since long before she began performing. Palacios acknowledges that she often takes uncomfortable topics and makes them more palatable to herself and her audiences with physical comedy, but not without challenges and some pushback. She continues to produce works like The OH! Show, where discussion of sex is intentionally ubiquitous. This is evident in the forward of the play, in which she declares, "...we are sexual beings until we die, or until your partner removes the vibrator from your hands—whichever comes first."

In her performances, Palacios restructures white and heteronormative narratives by using several modes of storytelling. One way by which she does this is adapting popular, and heterosexual, songs to include queer people in the narratives and uproot their heteronormativity. For example, she ends her show Queer Chicano Soul: Thirty Years of Fierce Performance, My Quinceañera Times Two, with a series of song snippets titled the "Vagina Medley." All lyrics were changed to accommodate the addition of the word, such as "I left my vagina in San Francisco," in which "vagina" replaces "heart" in Tony Bennett's I Left My Heart in San Francisco. This performance is made up of a variety of segments of autobiographical narratives, vignettes, segments of standup and mime. This format is reminiscent of traditional carpas that traveled to working-class Latinx people to engage them in theatre and political discourse (like Luis Valdez's El Teatro Campesino). Thus, the backdrop of Los Angeles, a city claimed to be of "Chicanos and Mexicanos" that Palacios has called "complex and brilliant inspiration" for her art, provides a place where she can teach and perform for diverse audiences. Like Queer Chicano Soul, the majority of her shows are grounded in her identity as a Chicana woman, as they switch between English and Spanish and have cultural references throughout.

In 2019, Palacios presented a work titled I’m Still Here as a direct response to the Trump Administration. She pulled from her own past, her upbringing in the 1970s and 80s, in order to escape the “toxic” present and to resist the erasure that seemed to be pressing down on all sides.

Palacios also draws inspiration from Latinx writers Jorge Huerta, Irene Fornes, Migdalia Cruz, Marga Gomez, and several others.

== Activism ==
From 1992–2000, Palacios was the director of VIVA, Lesbian and Gay Latino Artists of Los Angeles. She organized cultural events in Los Angeles County which combined art and activism. The goal of these events was to inspire and promote queer, Latino artists in her community, and the majority of her works are developed to empower them.

Palacios notes that when she was young, activism wasn’t a large part of her performances. But as queer and Latina audience began to thank her for being herself on stage, she realized she wanted to present the most “authentic version” of herself which became how she approached activism. She resisted the temptation to conform. Palacios notes “the more specific I get, the more universal my work.”

Palacios has won awards for her contributions to the queer and Latinx communities. She is a co-founding member of Culture Clash, whose satirical sketches, plays, and screenplays all feature race-based, political, and social commentary.

In 2016, Palacios performed her short play Say Their Names in the international theatre effort "After Orlando" in response to the Orlando nightclub shooting. That same year, she did a presentation about her career titled "Queer Chicana Lesbian Activism Through Theatre & Comedy" at the University of New Mexico. In 2014, she was a panelist at a World AIDs day panel called "Queer Latinidad: Histories of AIDS Consciousness from Los Angeles" at Pitzer College. Palacios does much of her activist work in universities. For example, she performed during Gay and Lesbian awareness month at UC San Diego, UC Santa Barbara, UCLA, and MIT in 1994.

Palacios helped develop and has her own blog on epochalips.com, an online platform where lesbians and allies can discuss similar experiences and find community in these shared moments.

Palacios is also featured in STAND UP STAND OUT, a queer documentary tracing the history of The Valencia Rose Cabaret.

== Written works ==
In over three decades, Palacios has written numerous plays, stand-up sets, poems, and articles. She began her solo work in 1982 and has dozens of performances.

=== One woman shows (select) ===
- 1997 Latin Lezbo Comic
- 2002: Queer Soul - 20 year retrospective
- 2002: Obvious
- 2002: Besame Mucho
- 2006: Get Your Feet Wet
- 2007: The OH! Show: Old & Horny
- 2011: Amor y Revolución
- 2011: Tofu Treats and Other Stories
- 2012: Viva La Independencia!
- 2012: Queer Chicana Soul - 30 year retrospective
- 2015: San Francisco, Mi Amor!
- 2015: Jota Love
- 2017: BROWNER QUEERER LOUDER PROUDER
- 2019: I'm Still Here

=== Plays (select) ===
- 2012: Slow Dance with a Woman
- 2013: Prom
- 2013: Miercoles Loves Luna
- 2014: Clock
- 2016: I Kissed Chavela Vargas
- 2017: Say Their Names

== Teaching and lecturing career ==
Palacios has been a lecturer at UCLA and UC Santa Barbara. She has taught several classes in the Chicano/a department at other universities as well, such as UC Riverside, Loyola Marymount University, The Claremont Colleges and The American Academy of Dramatic Arts. Her classes and guest lectures focus on the intersections of race, queerness, performance, and comedy.

In 2019, she was chosen as the Lucille Geier Lakes a writer-in-residence at Smith College.

== Honors and awards (select) ==
- 1990 VIVA, Lesbian & Gay Latino Artist Award, Excellence in Writing & Performing
- 2002 Out 100 for promoting positive queer messages, Out Magazine
- 2002 Tentaciones Magazine: One of 16 Most Influential LGBT Latinas/os In the Country. Honored for Activism, Achievements, Visibility & Leadership
- 2003 National LLEGO, El Premio Mujer Award: Honored for strengthening Latina lesbian/bisexual visibility and empowerment
- 2004-2003 Postdoctoral Rockefeller Fellowship, Center for Chicano Studies, UC Santa Barbara
- 2008 Nominated and Selected as Latino LGBT Community Leader, Adelante Magazine 10th Anniversary July Issue. Selected as Artist-in-Residence Breath of Fire Latina Theater Ensemble, Santa Ana
- October 12, 2012, declared Monica Palacios Day.
- 2012 Recognition from Los Angeles Mayor Antonio Villaraigosa, for 30-year career as a pioneering Chicana lesbian writer/performer.
- 2013 Miercoles Loves Luna, play selected for International Dublin Gay Theatre Festival
- 2013 Selected as Latinas of Influence for professional accomplishments & community service, HispanicLifestyle.com
- 2015 GO Magazine's annual "100 Women We Love" Honored for being a prominent out lesbian
- 2016 Selected playwright for Irene Fornés Playwriting Workshop. Institute for Latino Studies University of Notre Dame
- 2017 Latinx LGBTQ Trailblazer Award, City of Los Angeles, Presented by Councilmember Mike Bonin
- 2019 Selected as Lucille Geier Lakes Writer-in-Residence at Smith College Spring 2019
- 2022 50 Key Figures in Queer US Theatre, Routledge Key Guides
