= Zorro in Hell =

- Music: Culture Clash
- Lyrics: Culture Clash
- Basis: Zorro

Zorro in Hell is a satiric play by Richard Montoya, Ric Salinas and Herbert Siguenza, collectively known as Culture Clash. It is a profile of the legendary hero Zorro from a Latino viewpoint.

The play had its initial productions at Berkeley Repertory Theatre and the La Jolla Playhouse in 2006. It then ran at the Ricardo Montalbán Theatre in Hollywood from July 11 - August 19, 2007.

== Characters ==
- Nameless writer
- Don Ringo the first Chicano
- Kyle the Therapist Bear
- Whiskey Pete the desperado
- Austrian governor
- 200-year-old woman

== Reception ==
Bob Verini of Variety said the play "is overlong and not as consistently funny as it wants to be, largely because of the troupe's habit of site-specific name-dropping as a substitute for wit."

Tony Taccone, artistic director of the Berkeley Repertory Theatre described Zorro in Hell as a "bold piece of agitational propaganda" in a world capable of change. Taccone also analyzed the protagonist's humanity and role as a professional Fool.

Anne Marie Welsh of the San Diego Union-Tribune discussed the play's development in California's political climate from 2003-2005. Welsh notes the potential tension caused by the 2003 election of Arnold Schwarzenegger as Governor of California and the 2005 election of Antonio Villaraigosa as the first Mexican American Mayor of Los Angeles in 130 years. According to Siguenza of Culture Clash, the play asks "Who is a terrorist and who is a hero? Who is a Californian?"

Karen D'Souza of the Knight Ridder Tribune critiqued the middle of the play for its overuse of pop references and racial stereotypes. D'Souza noted that the play "starts and ends so explosively, you almost forget that the center is a mess."
