= Michael Lew (playwright) =

American dramatist

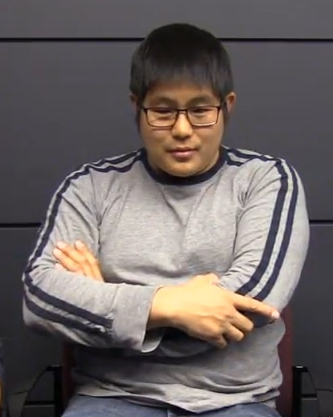
Lew in 2018

Michael (Mike) Lew is a Chinese-American playwright best known for his works Teenage Dick, and Tiger Style!. He earned a B.A. at Yale University in 2003, double majoring in Theatre (directing) and English (writing), then proceeded to get his artist diploma in playwriting at the Juilliard school in 2003. He is co-director of the Ma-Yi Theater Company Writers Lab and is on a 3-year fellowship at Ma-Yi through the Mellon Foundation.

== Early life ==
As a child, Lew was not a huge fan of theatre, claiming in an interview with The Dramatist that he in fact "associated theatre with shame" for the longest time. Some of his early experiences with theatre happened in college, where he started watching independent student theatre productions at his school on weekends, and fell in love with the community of people that worked together. While he was working as an assistant director of a play, he was offered by the artistic director to join the Ma-Yi Writers' Lab in 2005, where he met his wife and fellow playwright Rehana Mirza.

Lew and Mirza began to get involved in each other's work over the years, their heated discussions and disparity in writing styles gradually bringing them closer. Lew chose Mirza as the person who has had the biggest impact on his career, mainly because the different perspectives they share as Asian-Americans playwrights and the way they discuss various topics have influenced his writing profoundly. He soon became the co-director of the Ma-Yi Writers' Lab in 2010, and married Mirza a year later at the Museum of Contemporary Art San Diego.

== Career ==
=== Teenage Dick ===
Teenage Dick was a production commissioned and developed by Apothetae theatre company, a company that serves to present and explore plays that illustrate the "Disabled experience". It was a work that had been long discussed between Lew and Gregg Mozgala, one of Lew's favourite actors and the founder of the Apothetae. The play, which is a contemporary take on Shakespeare's Richard III, was first presented as a workshop production in 2016, and premiered at the Public Theater in June, 2018. Teenage Dick depicts the obstacles and decisions that the main character Richard, a 17-year-old boy with cerebral palsy, faces as he attempts to rise against those who picked on him by becoming the senior class president. As for his intentions in creating the play, Lew answered he hoped to "re-examine tired tropes about the disabled, create stories for people we're not otherwise seeing, hire more disabled artists, and carry out a ground-up reconsideration of how theatres embrace the mantle of inclusion".

=== Tiger Style! ===
Inspired by Amy Chua's book Battle Hymn of the Tiger Mother, Tiger Style! is about two Chinese-American siblings raised under the overachieving and Ivy League-seeking, tiger-style parenting. The duo soon discovers that academic achievements and hard work do not always equal personal or professional success, and decide to go on an "Asian Freedom Tour" on a mission to become more in touch with their Asian roots. As a third-generation Chinese-American immigrant from San Diego who was brought up under such tiger parenting, Lew personally felt that the book triggered some distressed responses among parents by misrepresenting this style of parenting, and "wanted to reexamine what the Asian-American spin is on what we both consider to be American values and also just cultural values" as well wanting to provide a "counter-narrative to we’re just a bunch of robots that don’t care about ourselves". He also claimed that the play isn't all about tiger parenting in Asian families but the immigrant experience in general, something that immigrants of various cultures and generations can relate to.

=== Other plays ===
Lew's other works include full-length plays such as Bike America (2013), Bhangin' It (2017), microcrisis (2010), Stockton (2009), People's Park (2008), and several short plays including Moustache Guys (2008), which was acclaimed by Neil Genzlinger in The New York Times as being "hilarious, so much so that you might be tempted to come see the show again".

=== TV/Film ===
He took part in several TV shows and Films as: a script consultant on DreamWorks Animation Untitled Bollywood Project (2018), a staff writer on YouTube's Sherwood (2019) and Blue Man Group (2012 - 2013), a contributor in Bon Appetit (2014) and Peg + Cat (2012).

== Publications ==
- Bike America (Samuel French, Inc. 2014)
- Virtual Congress (Playscripts, Inc. 2011)
- Roanoke (Playscripts, Inc. 2010)
- Moustache Guys (Playscripts, Inc. 2010)
- In Paris You Will Find Many Baguettes... (Playscripts, Inc. 2009)
- The Roosevelt Cousins, Thoroughly Sauced (Samuel French, Inc. 2008)
- Magician Ben Vs. The Wizard Merlin (Smith & Kraus. 2008)
- Yit, Ngay (One, Two) (Applause. 2007)

== Awards and achievements ==
- Dramatists Guild Council Member (2014–present)
- Lark Venturous Playwright Fellowship (2017 - 2019)
- Mellon Foundation Residency (2016–present)
- La Jolla Playhouse Artist in Residence (2018 - 2019)
- PEN Award (2018), Lanford Wilson Award (2014), Helen Merrill Award (2013), NYFA Fellow (2013)
- Kendeda Graduate Playwriting Award (2012)
- AracaWorks Graduate Playwriting Award (2012)
- InspiraTO Festival 1st Prize Winner (2009)
- Heideman Award Winner (2008)
- Samuel French Festival Winner (2007)
- Intel Science Talent Search Finalist (1999)
