= Tiger Style! =

Play by Mike Lew

- Original language: English
- Written by: Michael Lew

Tiger Style! is a 2016 stage play written by Mike Lew, an American-born playwright of Chinese heritage. It was first presented at Boston's Wimberly Theatre, Calderwood Pavilion, Boston Center for the Arts in October/November 2016, produced by the Huntington Theatre Company and directed by Moritz von Stuelpnagel.

== Description ==
The play is an attempt by a Chinese-American playwright to describe his conflicted feelings, being raised by "tiger parents" while confronting the realities of career and lifestyle choices in the United States. It covers the stereotypes that surround Chinese-Americans while illustrating the weight of such stereotypes on those involved. As the play opens, an older sister and a younger brother living in the United States are reflecting on the unrealized potential in their lives, as they squabble and consider their individual futures. They finally decide to travel to China, where "race will not be a problem".

Albert and Jennifer are both in their 30s. They were high achievers in their youth. They both went to Harvard (Jennifer graduated in three years). Jennifer played piano — "I was the first MD/PhD ever to sell out a concert at Carnegie Hall," she boasts — and he played cello. She became an oncologist; he became a software programmer. But they have ended up with neither the professional fulfillment nor the romantic satisfaction they anticipated. Their life plans are not being fulfilled.

Jennifer has just been dumped by her boyfriend, who excused his leaving by explaining that he at first found her exotic, but was disappointed when she was not "submissive". Albert has just been passed over for a promotion at his company. Looking for explanations for their relative failures, they first blame their parents. They decide it would be therapeutic to confront the parents to demand an apology for the "tiger parenting" that fostered unrealistic expectations but inadequate life skills. Says Albert, "I'm gonna yell at my mom like a white girl!"

However, Mom and Dad prove unrepentant; they advise the children to stop whining. So Albert and Jennifer decide to travel to China, the ancestral homeland, as part of an "Asian Freedom Tour" that will allow them to reinvent themselves ("If we can’t escape a racialized context in America despite being Americans, then we go be Chinese in China, where race is no longer a factor").

Complications ensue.

== Development ==
Playwright Mike Lew was interviewed on Boston FM radio station WBUR-FM's program All Things Considered to discuss the background of his play. He explained that "tiger parenting" is not a China-society phenomenon, but rather is a strategy which has been employed by some Chinese immigrants in an attempt to have their next-generation members be more accepted by American society. Lew said his play is his attempt to a) explain the origin of this strategy in Chinese-origin families; and b) explore the resulting pressures and reactions of the children thus involved. He said that many of his own feelings and experiences are portrayed (in a fictionalized format) in the play.

== Production history ==
=== Olney Theatre (2019) ===
Tiger Style! was performed at Olney Theatre in Olney, Maryland from July 17 to August 18 in 2019. The production was directed by Natsu Onoda Power, a Professor of Theater and Performance Studies at Georgetown University. It received high praise, being described as an "exuberant romp" by The Washington Post.
