= Herbert Sigüenza =

American actor

Herbert Siguenza
- Born: January 26, 1959 (age 67); San Francisco, California, U.S.
- Occupations: Actor; writer; performer
- Years active: 1980–present
- Spouse: Adriana Rodrigues (m. 2002; div. 2008) Samantha Siguenza (current)

Herbert Siguenza (born January 26, 1959) is an American actor, writer, visual artist, and performer based in California. He is best known for co-founding the theater performance group Culture Clash, which was founded in 1984 and is still active. He is currently the playwright-in-residence at the San Diego Rep and has continued to pursue many solo ventures in addition to his group work.

== Early life ==
Sigüenza was born in San Francisco, California on January 26, 1959. He is of Salvadoran descent and spent a portion of his life in El Salvador with his family before returning to California as a teenager to flee the civil unrest taking place in El Salvador. Upon his return, he attended Balboa High School and the California College of Art and Crafts where, a first-generation college student, he received a BFA in printmaking. At this point, the theater was not something that he knew he had an interest in pursuing.

== Career ==
Herbert was originally trained as an artist and print maker. Examples of his printmaking from the early 1980s can be seen in the collection of the Smithsonian American Art Museum. Shortly after receiving his BFA from California College of Art and Crafts, he served for 10 years as the Art Director at La Raza Silkscreen Center / La Raza Graphics in San Francisco. From there he moved into performing arts and became involved with Teatro Gusto performing in places like the Mission Cultural Center for Latino Arts.

Herbert began his acting career in 1984 when he co-founded Culture Clash with other members Ric Salinas, Richard Montoya, José Antonio Burciaga, Marga Gómez, and Monica Palacios. Together the group toured the country performing Chicano theater with topics often involving social commentary through the use of satire. While the latter three members went on to eventually drop out of the group, Sigüenza, Salinas, and Montoya still perform together today. Independently of the group, Sigüenza has also had a number of acting, writing, and producing roles.

He wrote and performed in a solo show, My Weekend with Pablo Picasso which features his skill at painting and has been performed at the Los Angeles Theatre Center, and the San Diego Rep. He wrote and performed in another show, ¡Cantinflas! about the Mexican comic of the same name, which was co-commissioned by the Alley Theatre in Houston and Yerba Buena Center for the Arts in San Francisco.

Other work of Sigüenza's includes Steal Heaven, and El Henry, an adaptation of Shakespeare's Henry IV which was presented at the La Jolla Playhouse in June 2014, and Manifest Destinitis, which premiered at the San Diego Rep in their 2016–2017 season, starring Mark Pinter and Jennifer Paredes. He won the Best New Play San Diego Critics Circle Award in 2014 for his work on El Henry. In 2016, Sigüenza began a three-year playwright residency at the San Diego Rep as a part of The Andrew W. Mellon Foundation's National Playwright Residency Program, administered by HowlRound.

Sigüenza was also involved in the making of Pixar's hit animated film Coco. He served as a cultural consultant ensuring that the movie was an accurate depiction of the Mexican culture that the movie explores. He is also credited with a voice acting role in the movie playing the characters of great-great-granduncles Tío Felipe & Oscar.

He is currently working on writing his next show called Birthday, a dark musical that is centered around people being able to come back to life from the dead for 24 hours on their birthday. This show is a departure from his previous work in its macabre content matter.

== Personal life ==
Herbert is the brother of Ruben Sigüenza, who played bass for the rock band Mink DeVille. Herbert is also the uncle of Damian Domino (producer) Sigüenza, Member of the Bay Area Hip Hop collective, Hieroglyphics (group). In 2002, he married Adriana Rodrigues. In 2008, he and Adriana had filed for divorce. He has since remarried to his current wife, Samantha. The two have a 6-year-old daughter named Belen.

== Legacy ==
Sigüenza's personal and professional papers are housed at the California State University, Northridge (CSUN) Special Collections and Archives in the University Library.
