= Culture Clash (performance troupe) =

American performance troupe

Comedy career
- Medium: Stand-up comedy, television, theatre
- Genres: Comedy, satire, Latino, Chicano
- Members: Richard Montoya; Ric Salinas; Herbert Sigüenza
- Former members: José Antonio Burciaga; Marga Gómez; Monica Palacios

Culture Clash is a performance troupe that currently comprises writer-comedians Richard Montoya, Ric Salinas, and Herbert Sigüenza. Their work is of a satirical nature.

Culture Clash was founded on May 5, 1984, at the Galería de la Raza in San Francisco's Mission District, by the writers José Antonio Burciaga, Marga Gómez, Monica Palacios, Richard Montoya, Ric Salinas, and Herbert Siguenza. The founding date is significant due to the importance of Cinco de Mayo to Mexican-Americans, the shared ethnicity of the majority of collaborators. Montoya and Sigüenza had both been involved in the Chicano art scene in the San Francisco Bay Area, Montoya being the son of Chicano poet, artist, and activist José Montoya, and Sigüenza having been involved in the art collective La Raza Graphics, which created works of graphic art to support campaigns of the Chicano Movement.

Culture Clash's works range from comedic sketches to full-length plays and screenplays, all of which feature political satire and social satire. The troupe's members have appeared separately and together in several films and received numerous awards, commissions and grants. In 1993 they filmed 30 episodes of a sketch comedy television series, also called Culture Clash. Several episodes were aired on Fox affiliates. In 2006 they premiered two new full-length plays, the comedy Zorro in Hell and SF: The Mexican Bus Mission Tour with CC!

Culture Clash's works have been collected in two volumes: Culture Clash: Life, Death and Revolutionary Comedy and Culture Clash in AmeriCCa: Four Plays. Their papers are housed at the California State University, Northridge (CSUN) Special Collections and Archives in the University Library.

== Touring around America ==
In the initial tour of Culture Clash, the group incorporated a wide variety of comedy sketches. However, the first tour led the group to start to consider other aspects of Latino culture in America. They began to notice that Latinos from different parts of the country were experiencing life and culture differently. “Those experiences changed our work,” Montoya said.

“We went from West Coast Mexican-American and Chicano issues to considering second- and third-generation matters — where they live, do they think like their grandparents, and how the different Latino groups behave in different regions of the country. We came away from that 10-year experience with a broadened world view. We understood we were not just a monolithic group, but that the Hispanic makeup is a wide group of people all with different experiences.”.

Gradually this focused the troupe's performances to become more serious about performance art and broadening the Latino experience to fit different areas of America.

== Theatre activism ==
While Culture Clash originated as a form of documentary style theatre used to satirize the American experience of Chicanos, the group has recently expanded the scope of their satire. The group traveled through America and reached towards the outside of American society to interview people with different ethnic backgrounds or sexual orientations. Using these interviews, the group went on to use the information as inspiration for new sketch characters and scenarios in their recent anthology of sketches, Culture Clash in AmeriCCa..

Culture Clash (still) in America often uses the same sketches that were used 20 years ago with different twists and interpretations of the characters. Although they decided to expand the scope of satire, the group believes that much of the script does not need tweaking due to the same relevance the content of their performances have regarding American society.

== SAPO ==
This play has been published in the anthology Reclaiming Greek Drama for Diverse Audiences together with an interview with Richard Montoya.

The word sapo translates as "frog" in Spanish, and the play was inspired by Aristophanes' comedy The Frogs, which explores the political views in Athens. It is celebrated for its sharp editorial outlooks on Athenian governmental issues and society. In SAPO, Dionysus and his cholo slave, Xavier, link up with a band and a coked-out manager to meet with a producer. Due to Culture Clash's satirical performances, they were able to dictate issues in a comical manner while presenting them through numerous American chaotic scenes. Instead of the setting being based in Greece, it was changed to California in the mid ’70s.

The plot pertains to a newly discovered Chicano band, El Sapo, which used their inspiration from the Latinx, tropical/funk-infused band, Buyepongo. They explain how they went through the difficulties of traveling in order to find success. Throughout their musical journey, they are on board the “tour bus to hell,” and are face to face with scenarios that are filled with a collective amount of ethos that reflects on the truth and power behind living as if they are in a broken society that lacks any sort of stability.

In terms of concentrated points of the play, one specific scene that is based on the hardships of living in an unbalanced society showcases a father and his daughter thinking their camping trip is going to be unproblematic. The father is having doubts while experiencing feelings of fear thinking about his current status of citizenship. He feels as if he has to constantly watch his back to avoid deportation and do anything to protect his daughter. The daughter expresses the opposite reaction while remaining in a calm state because she is confident that her knowledge of the DREAM Act will become useful if they are put in a situation that can potentially be tragic.

This play did not focus on one specific relevant topic, instead, it was complex, and incorporated various moral topics that can still be seen in today's current society. Culture Clash was able to adapt this into a satirical manner while also focusing on the importance of societal issues.
