= José Antonio Burciaga =

American poet

- Born: August 23, 1940; El Paso, Texas
- Died: October 7, 1996 (aged 56)
- Education: University of Texas El Paso
- Occupations: Muralist; artist; poet; writer
- Spouse: Cecilia Preciado

José Antonio "Tony" Burciaga (August 23, 1940 – October 7, 1996) was an American Chicano artist, poet, and writer who explored issues of Chicano identity and American society.

== Early career ==
In 1960 Burciaga joined the United States Air Force. After spending a year in Iceland, where he wrote extensively as part of his job, he was sent to Zaragoza, Spain, for three years. There he discovered the work of Spanish poet, Federico García Lorca. After completing his military service, he earned a B.A. in fine arts from the University of Texas at El Paso in 1968 and started work as an illustrator and graphic artist, first in Mineral Wells, Texas (an experience he later recorded in an "Hispanic Link" column called "Mineral Wells—A Near and Distant Memory"), and then in Washington, D.C., where he began his participation in the Chicano movement and where he met Cecilia Preciado, whom he married in 1972.

== Writing career ==
After moving to California in 1974 so Cecilia could work at Stanford University, Burciaga started writing reviews and columns for local journals and newspapers. In 1985 he became a freelance contributor to the syndicated column "Hispanic Link" and the Pacific News Service.

On May 5, 1984, he helped found the Latino comedy troupe, Culture Clash at the Galería de la Raza in San Francisco's Mission District along with Marga Gómez, Monica Palacios, Richard Montoya, Ric Salinas, and Herbert Sigüenza. Tony continued performing with the group until 1988.

Tony and Cecilia Burciaga lived near Stanford University, where Cecilia served in various positions, including Associate Dean of Graduate Studies, Associate Provost for Faculty Affairs, and Assistant to the President as Director of the Office of Chicano Affairs. In her post, she became very active in the support and formation of the Chicano community at Stanford, including the creation of El Centro Chicano, a Chicano/Latino student center. Tony Burciaga continued his writing and drawing.

In 1985, Tony and Cecilia became Resident Fellows in Casa Zapata, a unique Chicano theme dormitory where approximately half of the residents were Chicano undergraduate students. Tony, Cecilia, and their two children lived in a small apartment attached to the dormitory. The dormitory put on various Chicano and Latino-related educational events and gatherings, and was also well known for its history of mural art. In Casa Zapata, Burciaga contributed to this tradition, and painted several murals with students. His most well-known mural is the critically acclaimed "Last Supper of Chicano Heroes" in the Casa Zapata dining hall. The students of the dorm filled out a survey about who their heroes were, then Burciaga placed these figures sitting around the table in the traditional image of "The Last Supper." Included in this image were people such as Sor Juana Ines de la Cruz, Ignacio Zaragoza, César Chávez, Che Guevara, Martin Luther King Jr. and others. It is part of a larger mural entitled "The History of Maize." Both of the Burciagas served as Resident Fellows until 1994.

As a writer, Burciaga became increasingly successful in the late 1980s and early 1990s with the publication of several books. Weedee Peepo (1988), Drink Cultura (1993), and Spilling the Beans (1995) are all collections of essay exploring social issues with a bilingual blend of wit and wisdom. His 1992 book of poetry, Undocumented Love, won the American Book Award.

Through his writings, he regularly spoke at various community-based events for social justice in the San Francisco Bay Area including East Palo Alto, Redwood City, and San Jose. Burciaga was intensely involved in supporting actions for social justice including opposing anti-immigration movements such as California Proposition 187 and other English-only policies.

In 1995, while in remission from cancer, Burciaga won the Hispanic Heritage Award for Literature.

Burciaga died on October 7, 1996. At the time, he was working on his first novel about a group of friends growing up in El Paso, Texas. In 1997, In Few Words/ En Pocas Palabras: A Compendium of Latino Folk Wit and Wisdom, was published posthumously.

Burciaga's success as a muralist, poet, journalist, and humorist was in his versatility and virtuosity with language. He wrote in Spanish, English, and combinations of the two to express social criticism and his deep feelings of alienation. Francisco Lomelí and Donaldo Urioste, in their review (De Colores, 1977) of Restless Serpents (1976), said that his poetry "is powered by an incisive sense of irony with the purpose of criticizing set or ignored truths.... His critical approach becomes effective because his attacks avoid demagogic or abstract declarations."

Burciaga's appeal as a writer lay in his sense of humor, which he used to satirize the rigidity of a system still clinging to traditions of racism and discrimination. With few exceptions his themes are eminently political and social, echoing the early militant voices of poets like Ricardo Sánchez, Abelardo Barrientos Delgado, and Raymundo "Tigre" Pérez, although Burciaga avoided Sánchez's strident anger and provocative license with language..

== Writings ==
- RESTLESS SERPENTS (1976) – Book
- "La Verdad es que Me Canso" (1976) – Poem
- "It's the Same Guy" (1977) – Poem
- Rio Grande, Rio Bravo (1978) – Short Story
- Romantic Nightmare (1978) – Short Story
- "Smelda and Rio Grande" (1978) – Poem
- "Pasatiempos and There's a Vulture" (1978) – Poem
- "World Premiere" (1978) – Poem
- "Ghost Riders" (1978) – Poem
- "To Mexico with Love" (1978) – Poem
- Drink Cultura (1979) – Essays
- Españotli Titlan Englishic (1980) – Short Story
- El Corrido de Pablo Ramírez (1980) – Short Story
- "Letanía en Caloacute" (1980) – Poem
- "Dear Max and Without Apologies" (1980) – Poem
- "The Care Package" (1980) – Poem
- Versos Para Centroamérica (1981) – Novel
- "I Remember Masa" (1981) – Poem
- "For Emmy" (1981) – Poem
- Sammy y los Del Tercer Barrio (1983) – Short Story
- La Sentencia (1984) – Short Story
- "El Retefemenismo and El Juan Cuéllar de San Jo" (1984) – Poem
- WEEDEE PEEPO: A Collection of Essays (1988) – Book
- UNDOCUMENTED LOVE/AMOR INDOCUMENTADO: A Personal Anthology of Poetry (1992) --Book
- DRINK CULTURA: Chicanismo (1993) – Book
- SPILLING THE BEANS: Loteria Chicana (1995) – Book
- IN FEW WORDS/ EN POCAS PALABRAS: A Compendium of Latino Folk Wit and Wisdom (1997) --Book
- "The Last Supper of Chicano Heroes: The Selected Works of Jose Antonio Burciaga" Edited my Mimi Gladstein and Daniel Chacón. (2008)

== See also ==
- History of the Mexican-Americans in Texas
