= Richard Montoya =

American actor

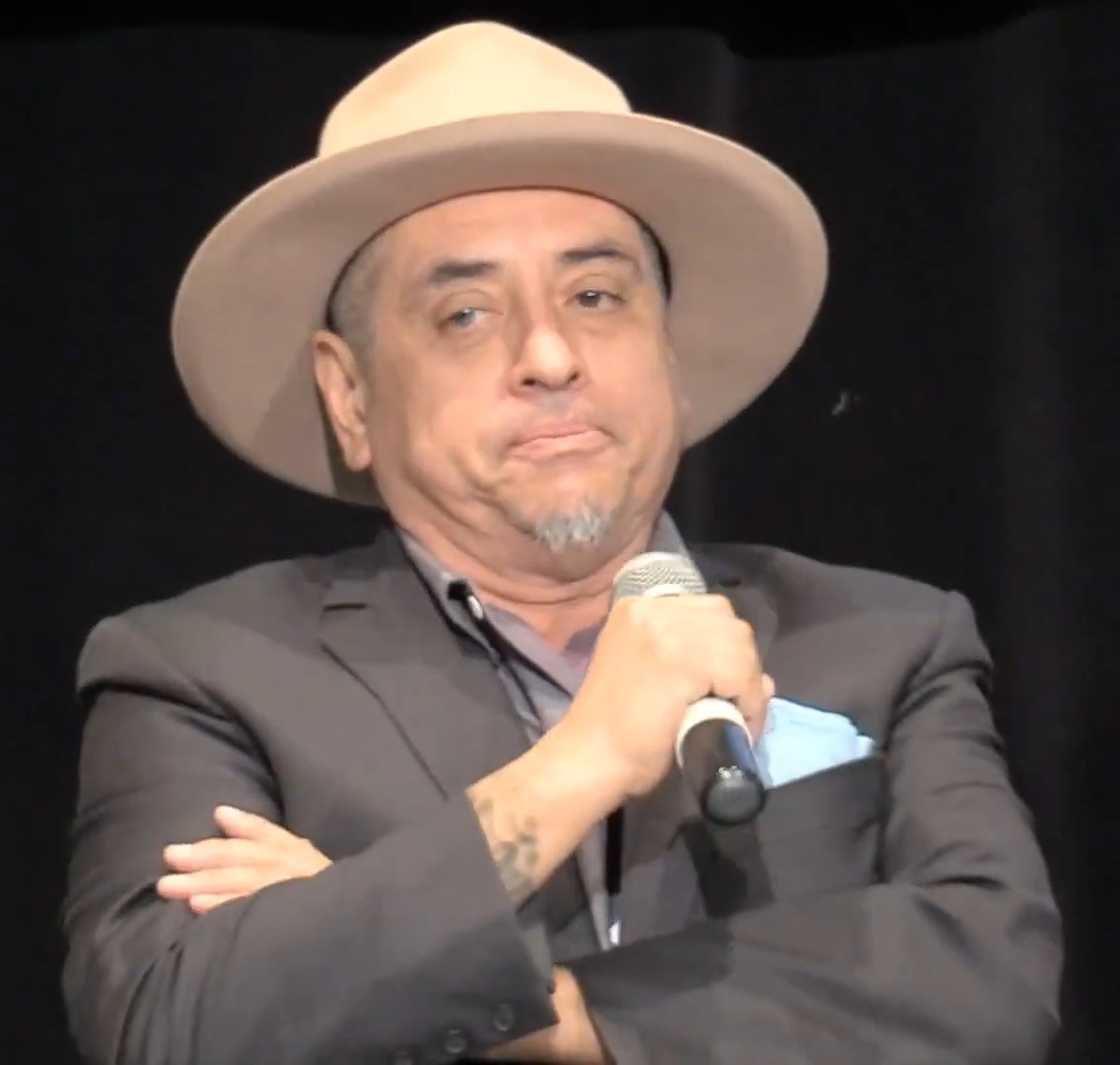
Richard Montoya at the Oregon Shakespeare Festival, September 2019

Richard Montoya is an American actor, director, producer, screenwriter, playwright, comedian, and co-founding member of the San Francisco based performance troupe Culture Clash. His work in theatre is largely comedy-based and centers around ideas of racism, immigration, discrimination, and identity in Latin-American communities. He follows in the steps of his father, activist José Montoya, and is known for creating social and political change through a variety of artistic expressions.

== Early life and education ==
Richard Montoya was born in San Diego, CA in 1959 to parents actively involved in the United Farm Workers Movement of the 1970s and 1980s. He was influenced by his family's involvement in matters of civil rights to pursue a career in political and social activism, and chose to accomplish these goals mainly through writing original works and acting in plays and films concerned with matters of culture, racism, and Latino identity in the United States. He attended California State University, Sacramento in addition to studying at the American Conservatory Theater. Montoya has also spent time working with Luis Valdez's famed El Teatro Campesino, as well as with the Sundance Institute's Writers and Directors Lab. He has been awarded two Annenberg Fellowships through the Sundance Institute. He used his 2007 grant to transform Water & Power, what was originally created as a play by Culture Clash, into the 2013 film of the same name.

== Career ==
=== Early career: Culture Clash ===
On May 5, 1984, Richard Montoya along with Ric Salinas, Herbert Sigüenza, José Antonio Burciaga, Marga Gómez, and Monica Palacios founded a performance troupe based out of the Mission District of San Francisco called Culture Clash with the goal of creating theatrical and artistic works of political satire through which controversial ideas of immigration and multiculturalism were discussed. In Montoya's words, Culture Clash was created to be "part gallery installation, [part] stand-up, [and part] theater – Chicano Teatro" occurring at the "height [of] civil strife" in Latin-American Countries such as Nicaragua and El Salvador that worked in tandem with the United Farm Workers and the Chicano Movement to heighten political and social around multicultural issues of racism, immigration, discrimination, and more. Culture Clash focuses on creating works of satire mainly in the form of full-length plays and short comedic skits. Their works include Culture Clash in AmeriCCa, Chavez Ravine, and A Bowl of Beings.

=== Later career and notable works ===
Although Culture Clash is still a collective, Montoya has also branched out and created works of his own. In addition to works produced through Culture Clash, Montoya has authored and co-authored works for a variety of works for prominent theatre companies like Berkeley Rep, the Oregon Shakespeare Festival, and the San Diego Repertory Theatre. In addition to these co-authored works, as an independent writer he has created such works as Water & Power (play, 2006; film, 2013), American Night: The Ballad of Juan José (play, 2010), and The River (play, 2013). Montoya also served as a staff writer on the first season of NBC's Southland.

Montoya played a role in Jared and Jerusha Hess's 2006 movie Nacho Libre.

== Critical reception ==
Works created through Culture Clash have received mixed reviews from critics and audience members. According to the LA Times, the 2003 production of the group's Chavez Ravine lacked depth and others said it was too long to hold audience's attention, even though audience members touted the work as "the group's most important play". The troupe revived the play in 2015 and received more positive, but still mixed, reviews.

Montoya's individual creations, such as American Night: The Ballad of Juan José, which originally debuted at the Oregon Shakespeare Festival in 2010, were generally well received by critics, being called "fun and thoughtful". Water & Power, the 2013 film written and directed by Montoya has an average rating of 3.6/5 based on 152 ratings on Rotten Tomatoes, with 67% of audience members liking the film.

== Legacy ==
Montoya's personal and professional papers are housed at the California State University, Northridge (CSUN) Special Collections and Archives in the University Library.
