= Adam Scorgie =

Canadian documentary film producer

Adam Scorgie is a Canadian documentary film producer based in Edmonton, Alberta, and is the founder of Score G Production Films.

== Career ==
Adam's feature documentary debut, The Union: The Business Behind Getting High, was awarded Best Canadian Documentary at the 2007 Edmonton International Film Festival, an award sponsored by the National Film Board. The follow-up sequel, The Culture High, premiered in the 2014 Cinéfest Sudbury International Film Festival and won Best Documentary at the 2015 AMPIA Awards. Adam has appeared on The Joe Rogan Experience twice to discuss these films.

In 2016 Adam produced the feature documentary Ice Guardians. Ice Guardians was listed in Newsweek's Favorite Documentaries Of 2016. and Sports Illustrated's Best Of Film in 2016. The film went on to be nominated for four Rosie Awards in 2017 including Best Documentary Over 30 minutes, and nominated for two Leo Awards including Best Feature Documentary and Best Director.

In 2018 Adam partnered with NHL and Hockey Hall of Fame goaltender, Grant Fuhr, to produce his feature documentary Making Coco: The Grant Fuhr Story. The theatrical premiere at Rogers Place in Edmonton, Alberta on October 17, 2018 set a Canadian documentary screening record with over 3,000 in attendance. The film won Best Feature Documentary at the 2019 Hollywood International Independent Documentary Awards and was nominated for five Rosie Awards in 2019 including Best Documentary Over 30 Minutes.

Adam's next documentary, Inmate #1: The Rise of Danny Trejo, started the world film festival circuit in 2019 and won the Audience Choice Award for Best Canadian Documentary and Best Overall Film, placing #1 in the Overall Top 10 Feature Films Rankings list at the Calgary International Film Festival. The film also secured Adam the 2019 Edmonton Film Prize.

In 2021 Adam partnered with Two-Time UFC Champion, Michael Bisping, to produce Bisping. The film won three Rosie Awards in 2021 including Best Documentary over 30 Minutes, Best Screenwriter - Unscripted Over 30 Minutes, and Best Overall Sound - Unscripted Over 30 Minutes. The film also won two Leo Awards including Best Picture Editing Feature Length Documentary and Best Musical Score in a Feature Length Documentary.

== Filmography ==
- The Union: The Business Behind Getting High- 2007 - Producer
- The Culture High - 2014 - Producer
- Ice Guardians - 2016 - Producer
- Making Coco: The Grant Fuhr Story - 2018 - Producer
- Inmate #1: The Rise of Danny Trejo - 2019 - Producer
- Bisping - 2021 - Producer
