= Hack (comedy) =

Term for unoriginal jokes

Hack is a term used primarily in stand-up comedy, but also sketch comedy, improv comedy, and comedy writing to refer to a joke or premise for a joke that is considered obvious, has been frequently used by comedians in the past and/or is blatantly copied from its original author. Alternatively, it may refer to a comedian or performance group that uses hack material or similarly unoriginal devices in their act. Since comedians and people who work with comedians are typically exposed to many more jokes than the general public, they may recognize a topic, joke or performer as hack before the general public does; as a result, even performers who do well on stage may be considered hacks by their peers.

The word "hack" is derived from the British term "hackneyed", meaning "overused and thus cheapened, or trite".

One proposed amelioration to hackneyed material is an essay by George Orwell, Politics and the English Language: The Six Rules.

Occasionally, a performer will be one of the first to develop a joke about a specific topic, and later others will follow suit to excess. This renders the topic "hack" to new performers but is not considered a detriment to the originator of the material.

Reusing humor can also be joke theft if it is taken without permission from another specific comedian.

== History ==
From the Catskill and Vaudeville beginnings of stand-up comedy, hacking was common as there were few chances that a performer from one area would meet one from another and a single twenty-minute set could sustain a comic for a decade.

In the late fifties and early sixties, Will Jordan perfected a caricature performance of Ed Sullivan (incorporating mispronouncing the word "show" as "shoe") that became the basis for all other impersonators that followed. Soon after, Jackie Mason, Rich Little and others began adapting Jordan's caricature to their own acts. This resulted in many of Jordan's shows being canceled due to other performers doing his bit two weeks previous to his shows at the same venue. John Byner, in turn, developed his own, oft-imitated, version of Jordan's caricature that George Carlin cited as being set up with the words, "Now you know!"

In the sixties, comedy took a turn for the more personal. Comics like Lenny Bruce, Richard Pryor, and George Carlin were no longer regurgitating joke after joke, but instead were offering insight to their own lives from a comedic point of view. As a result, jokes and persona were largely unique to the performer. Hacking proved more difficult, but also more offensive to the writer.

In the seventies joke theft became more prominent with the boom in popularity of comedy. The eighties and nineties saw the popularity of stand-up comedy continue to increase. With the advent of pay-cable networks, comics were afforded the opportunity to perform their routines unfettered. With this came a new type of joke theft wherein the first comic to tell a stolen joke on some sort of media became the one associated with the joke.

For many years, Denis Leary had been friends with fellow comedian Bill Hicks. However, when Hicks heard Leary's 1992 album No Cure For Cancer, he felt Leary had stolen his act and material. The friendship ended abruptly as a result.

At least three stand-up comedians have gone on the record stating they believe Leary stole not just some of Hicks' material but his persona and attitude. As a result of this, it is claimed that after Hicks' death from pancreatic cancer, an industry joke began to circulate about Leary's transformation and subsequent success (roughly; "Question: Why is Denis Leary a star while Bill Hicks is unknown? Answer: Because there's no cure for cancer").

Also in the nineties, began a nearly universal hack of an impression of Bill Cosby, the style of which was first unveiled by Eddie Murphy in his concert Raw.

More recent times have seen public rivalries between comics over the subject of hacking. Louis CK has maintained a relatively quiet rivalry with Dane Cook over three bits on Cook's album, Retaliation that allegedly bear some resemblance to three bits on CK's album Live in Houston. This claim is further complicated by both artists having performed bits on naming kids that strongly resemble "My Real Name", a bit from Steve Martin's album, A Wild and Crazy Guy.

Joe Rogan, by contrast has been very open in accusing Carlos Mencia of hacking.

In France, many famous stand-up comedians (Gad Elmaleh, Jamel Debbouze, Tomer Sisley, Malik Bentalha, Mickael Quiroga, Yacine Belhousse, Arthur, Michel Leeb, Walter, Rémi Gaillard, Roland Magdane, Michael Youn, Mathieu Madénian, Olivier de Benoist) have been accused of plagiarism by the Facebook/Twitter/YouTube account CopyComic.

In 2011, one of the contestants on the talent quest television program Australia's Got Talent was Jordan Paris, whose act was stand-up comedy. His act went well, the judges were impressed, and he made it through to the semi-finals. However, it was later revealed that he had plagiarised his jokes from comedians Lee Mack and Geoff Keith. The television network eventually decided to give him a chance to redeem himself and he was allowed to compete in the semi-final, provided he use his own material. Paris' effort this time was self-deprecating, joking about his plagiarism and his large teeth. The first joke went well, but the rest went downhill. It was later found out that the joke that went well - "I just sacked my two writers - Copy and Paste" - had been done in 2009 by comedian Jeffrey Ross, about Brad Garrett, at a roast of Joan Rivers. Ross had said, "This guy has two writers, their names are Cut and Paste."

In January 2012, Blogger and comedian Troy Holm was ridiculed on the social networking site Facebook for stealing jokes and stories from comedian Doug Stanhope and posting them to his Blog from 2010, claiming them as his own work, including Stanhope's "Fuck someone uglier than you" routine, which was found on Stanhope's Acid Bootleg. Troy Holm also plagiarized Stanhope's story of an encounter with a transsexual prostitute nearly verbatim, substituting himself as Stanhope, and changing a few small details, causing a backlash from Stanhope's fans. This catapulted Troy Holm into an internet icon which started the "Occupy Troy Holm" Movement. Stanhope commented on the Occupy Troy Holm Facebook page that "To the few people who seem to think this is overboard...and it is...I don't think that you know the levels to which this guy has been ripping me off. He didn't take a tit-fuck joke and use it as a status update. He's been living my entire life as though it was his, changing some names and then promoting with twitters... Look at his site and most the entirety of it is me, including the comments where he uses my stuff to pass as his own conversation. And on Twitter. So who is he ripping off for that stuff that isn't mine?"

== Hacking in the media ==
Hacking is not limited to stand-up comedy. Often entire premises in film and television shows are taken from comics or even other media.

Dick Cavett and Woody Allen often cited to each other the many instances of their jokes appearing in television shows without their permission, sometimes even falsely attributed to each other.

Allen's jokes and topics were regularly stolen by the highly successful television show, Laugh In. This proved extremely painful to Allen.

Several episodes of The Simpsons, including "Missionary: Impossible", "Treehouse of Horror XIII", and "The Italian Bob" have poked fun at Family Guy, implying that MacFarlane's show is guilty of stealing jokes and premises from The Simpsons. However, the producers of both shows have said that there is no serious feud between the two of them and their shows.

== Recourse and consequences ==
There is, historically, very little legal recourse taken in cases of hacking. Some comics, however, have chosen to exact their own justice. W. C. Fields reportedly paid fifty dollars to have a hack comic's legs broken.

Typically, the repercussions of hacking are limited to personal animosity. On this issue, it sometimes appears that the offended comics are alone in their concern. For example, on February 10, 2007, at the Comedy Store in Los Angeles, Joe Rogan argued on-stage with Carlos Mencia, accusing him of hacking other comedians' work. According to Rogan's account, he had just finished his act and introduced the next performer, Ari Shaffir, as a comedian who opens for "Carlos Men-steal-ia". Mencia took offense and walked on the stage. The Comedy Store later cancelled Rogan's shows and suggested he "take a break" from the Comedy Store, which was then followed by Rogan's manager (who also manages Mencia) dropping Rogan. The entire incident was filmed as part of Rogan's internet reality show, JoeShow. It was then made available to watch or download at numerous websites, including Rogan's.

Joe Rogan said, "People take plagiarism so seriously in all other forms of media, whether it's music, newspapers, books, but with comedy, it's like, 'You're on your own, fucker.'"

The internet, however, has opened up a new medium for "outing" a hack. Websites like YouTube allow users to upload videos and share them with others. This has made it much easier to show evidence of joke thievery in a public forum.

In January 2012, Troy Holm, an amateur Comic, stole several jokes from Doug Stanhope and posted them to his blog under the guise of having written them, himself. Stanhope discovered the blog and tipped-off his fans who then deluged Holm’s blog with negative and berating comments. The blog has since been taken down.

Steven Rosenthal and Steve Silberberg have published a Guide to Hack to help new comics avoid hacking, which references (and gives credit to) an earlier work on the same subject by Andy Kindler called, The Hacks Handbook: A Starter Kit.
