= Joke theft =

Repetition of other people's original jokes without credit

Joke theft is the act of performing and taking credit for comic material written or performed by another person without their consent and without acknowledging the other person's authorship. This may be a form of plagiarism and can, in some cases, be copyright infringement. A comic who is known to steal jokes may be labelled with the epithet "hack" by other comics. A "hack comic" uses material that is unoriginal or which is blatantly copied from its original author.

Some cases of alleged joke theft are ambiguous, due to the possibility of simultaneous and coincidental discovery. Some comics have defended their re-use of other people's jokes as satire or as a calque (word-for-word translation). Other comics have claimed that their re-use was a type of "borrowing," or taking inspiration.

== History ==
=== Vaudeville years ===
In music halls and vaudeville, it was common for performers to "borrow" material. According to Milton Berle, etiquette only required that "the borrower add to the joke and make it his own". At the time there were few chances that a performer from one area would meet one from another and a single twenty-minute set could sustain a comic for a decade. Most jokes at the time were one-liners and there was little in the way of proof of a joke's origin, but the value of each joke was immeasurable to a comedian. Berle and Bob Hope had a long-standing feud due to Hope's accusation that Milton Berle had stolen some of his jokes. Berle never disputed the claim, but instead embraced the title "The Thief of Bad Gag".

Even the most famous of comics have found themselves, knowingly or unknowingly, stealing material. Bill Cosby admitted to stealing a joke by George Carlin involving an uneducated football player doing a television commercial. Cosby said that what makes the routine his own is the surreal phrase "little tiny hairs". Many years later, Carlos Mencia performed a bit about athletes and their parents that hearkened back to a Cosby bit from his album Bill Cosby: Himself.

=== 1970s ===
In the 1970s, joke theft became more prominent with the boom in popularity of comedy. The 1980s and 1990s saw the popularity of stand-up comedy continue to increase. The advent of pay-cable networks afforded comics the opportunity to perform their routines unfettered. With this came a new type of joke theft in which the first comic to tell a stolen joke on some sort of media became the one associated with the joke.

Several comics accused Robin Williams of stealing their material. David Brenner claimed that he confronted Williams personally and threatened him with bodily harm if he heard Williams utter another one of his jokes.

=== 1990s ===
For many years, Denis Leary had been friends with fellow comedian Bill Hicks. However, when Hicks heard Leary's 1993 album No Cure For Cancer, he felt Leary had stolen his act and material, and the friendship ended abruptly as a result. At least three stand-up comedians have gone on the record stating they believe Leary stole not just some of Hicks's material but his persona and attitude. As a result of this, it is claimed that after Hicks's death from pancreatic cancer, an industry joke began to circulate about Leary's transformation and subsequent success (roughly; "Question: Why is Denis Leary a star while Bill Hicks is unknown? Answer: Because there's no cure for cancer").

In a 2008 appearance on The Opie and Anthony Show, comedian Louis C.K. claimed that Leary stole his "I'm an asshole" routine, which was then expanded upon and turned into a hit song by Leary. On a later episode of the same show, Leary challenged this assertion by claiming that he (Leary) co-wrote the song with Chris Phillips.

In his memoir Gasping for Airtime, Jay Mohr admitted that he lifted an entire routine from Rick Shapiro's act for a 1995 Saturday Night Live sketch. He stated that Shapiro sued the show and was financially compensated, but Shapiro later disputed that he received any compensation.

=== 2000s and 2010s ===
Louis C.K. has maintained a rivalry with Dane Cook over three bits on Cook's album, Retaliation, that allegedly bear some resemblance to three bits on C.K.'s album Live in Houston. C.K. and Cook portray this rivalry with comedy and sincerity in an episode of C.K.'s series Louie.

George Lopez has accused Carlos Mencia ("Menstealya") of plagiarizing his material and claimed that the two once had a physical altercation over the alleged plagiarism. Later, Joe Rogan publicly confronted Mencia, accusing him of stealing jokes from him and other comedians. Following this confrontation, Rogan was banned from The Comedy Store for several years. However, fellow comedian Ted Sarnowski countered these claim and stated that it was he, not Lopez, who had originally penned the joke and that he had given Mencia permission to use it when he discovered that Lopez had stolen it.

In France, many famous stand-up comedians (Gad Elmaleh, Jamel Debbouze, Tomer Sisley, Malik Bentalha, Mickael Quiroga, Yacine Belhousse, Arthur, Michel Leeb, Walter, Rémi Gaillard, Roland Magdane, Michael Youn, Mathieu Madénian, Olivier de Benoist) have been accused of plagiarism by the Facebook/Twitter/YouTube account CopyComic.

In 2011, Australia's Got Talent contestant Jordan Paris presented an act of stand-up comedy and quickly proceeded to the semi-finals. However, it was later revealed that he had plagiarised his jokes from comedians Lee Mack and Geoff Keith. The television network gave him a chance to redeem himself and allowed him to compete in the semi-finals using his own material. Paris's effort this time was self-deprecating, joking about his plagiarism and his large teeth. The first joke went well, but the rest went downhill. It was later found out that the joke that went well – "I just sacked my two writers – Copy and Paste" – had been done in 2009 by comedian Jeffrey Ross, about Brad Garrett, at a roast of Joan Rivers. Ross had said, "This guy has two writers; their names are Cut and Paste."

In January 2012, blogger and comedian Troy Holm was ridiculed on the social networking site Facebook for stealing jokes and stories from comedian Doug Stanhope and posting them to his blog from 2010, claiming them as his own work, including Stanhope's "Fuck someone uglier than you" routine, which was found on Stanhope's Acid Bootleg. Troy Holm also plagiarized Stanhope's story of an encounter with a transsexual prostitute from the Sicko album nearly verbatim, substituting himself as Stanhope, and changing a few small details, causing a backlash from Stanhope's fans. This catapulted Troy Holm into an internet icon which started the "Occupy Troy Holm" Movement. Stanhope commented on the Occupy Troy Holm Facebook page that "To the few people who seem to think this is overboard...and it is...I don't think that you know the levels to which this guy has been ripping me off. He didn't take a tit-fuck joke and use it as a status update. He's been living my entire life as though it was his, changing some names and then promoting with twitters... Look at his site and most the entirety of it is me, including the comments where he uses my stuff to pass as his own conversation. And on Twitter. So who is he ripping off for that stuff that isn't mine?"

As part of his website Stewart Lee hosts Plagiarists Corner where he cites examples from Jack Whitehall, Ricky Gervais, Hari Kondabolu, Simon Amstell, John Oliver using material similar to his own.

In the 2010s, the widespread use of video camera-equipped smartphones led to an increase in unauthorized recordings of live comedy shows, some of which were shared online, which may have facilitated joke theft. Some comedians request that no unauthorized audio or video recordings be made of their shows to reduce joke theft.

In January 2016, Amy Schumer was accused of stealing jokes by comedians Tammy Pescatelli, Kathleen Madigan, and Wendy Liebman. Schumer denied the allegations. Other comedians, such as Marc Maron and Dave Rubin, defended Schumer. Pescatelli later apologized, stating it had "gone too far" and was probably "parallel thinking".

== In other media ==
Joke theft is not limited to stand-up comedy. Often jokes in film and television shows are taken from comics or even other media. Dick Cavett wrote about joke theft in his autobiography. He'd written a bit about eating Chinese-German food and, an hour later, being hungry for power. After a few days of performing the bit, he discovered a column by Earl Wilson which attributed the joke to Rip Taylor. However, after calling Taylor to ask him to stop using the bit, he discovered that not only had Taylor never performed the bit, he had never even heard it and laughed heartily at the joke's humor. It was then that Cavett discovered that some journalists often falsely attribute jokes to the wrong comics.

Cavett and Woody Allen often cited to each other the many instances of their jokes appearing in television shows without their permission, sometimes even falsely attributed to each other. Allen's jokes, when he still lacked access to television, were regularly stolen by top mainstream shows The Red Skelton Show and Laugh In.

Several episodes of The Simpsons, including "Missionary: Impossible", "Treehouse of Horror XIII" and "The Italian Bob" have poked fun at Family Guy, implying that MacFarlane's show is guilty of stealing jokes and premises from The Simpsons. However, the producers of both shows have said that there is no serious feud between the two of them and their shows.

Radar magazine published a cartoon of actor Leslie Nielsen holding a shoe phone in an article discussing the many jokes in The Naked Gun film series lifted verbatim from the television series Get Smart. The column quoted Jerry Zucker’s defense how there are only “a finite number of jokes” making overlap inevitable, but the same article cited copycat gags also lifted from The Pink Panther films and other sources. The director of Naked Gun 33⅓: The Final Insult conceded the Naked Gun films were “… a bit of an homage to Get Smart” but neither Buck Henry nor Leonard Stern of the original series felt flattered with the former claiming “Get Smart was used as a guide track for those Naked Gun movies.”

In 2017 Australian television show host Grant Denyer was interviewed on Triple M Sydney radio programme The Grill Team. In the interview, The Grill Team's co-host Matty Johns told an amusing anecdote about introducing a child to the board game Test Match. Later that morning, Grant Denyer was interviewed on the radio programme The Kyle & Jackie O Show on KIIS 106.5. In that interview, he told the same anecdote about Test Match, passing it off as his own.

== Recourse and consequences ==
There is, historically, very little legal recourse taken in cases of joke theft. Some comics, however, have chosen to exact their own justice. W. C. Fields reportedly paid fifty dollars to have a thieving comic's legs broken.

"You have a better chance of stopping a serial killer than a serial thief in comedy," said comedian David Brenner. "If we could protect our jokes, I'd be a retired billionaire in Europe somewhere – and what I just said is original."

According to a 2018 study in the American Sociological Review, "most instances of possible joke theft are ambiguous, owing to the potential for simultaneous and coincidental discovery," and it observes that accusations of joke theft can reflect peers' perceptions of a suspicious comic's membership in the stand-up community and overall craft as much as the similarity between jokes.
