= Sammy Shore =

American actor and comedian (1927–2019)

- Publicity Photo Of Sammy Shore
- Born: February 7, 1927; New York City, New York, U.S.
- Died: May 18, 2019 (aged 92); Las Vegas, Nevada, U.S.
- Spouses: Mitzi Shore (m. 1950; div. 1974) Suzanne Dennie (m. 1990)
- Children: 4, including Pauly Shore

Sammy Shore (February 7, 1927 – May 18, 2019) was an American actor, stand-up comedian and co-founder of The Comedy Store.

== Early life ==
Sammy Shore was born in 1927 in New York City at the start of the Great Depression in the United States. He grew up in a traditional household with Jewish parents.

== Career ==
Shore began his career doing stand-up comedy with Shecky Greene in the Catskill Mountains. He was chosen, in 1969, to open for Elvis Presley’s comeback performance at the International Hotel, Las Vegas. He then opened for Elvis’ road shows until 1972. Shore continued to perform comedy, opening for Tony Orlando, Tony Bennett, Barbra Streisand, Sammy Davis Jr. and others. Shore served in the U.S. Navy during World War II.

On April 7, 1972, he founded the Comedy Store with his writing partner Rudy De Luca. In 1974, his ex-wife, Mitzi, became the owner of the club. The club launched the careers of many comedians including Rodney Dangerfield, David Letterman, Eddie Murphy, Robin Williams, Jim Carrey, and Joe Rogan, also including his own son, Pauly.

Shore appeared in many films including The Bellboy with Jerry Lewis and both Life Stinks and History of the World Part 1 from Mel Brooks. He appeared on The Ed Sullivan Show and was on Sanford and Son.

Shore was voted Best Comedy Act in Atlantic City, New Jersey, and the Los Angeles Board of Supervisors named a day after him on July 24, 1990. He appeared at Harrah's Casinos and hotels more than any other entertainer.

== Personal life ==
Shore was married to Mitzi for 24 years, and was the father of four, including actor and comedian Pauly Shore. Shore married Suzanne Dennie in 1990. She was Miss Alabama in 1970. They remained together until his death in Las Vegas, Nevada of natural causes at the age of 92.
