= Ollie Joe Prater =

American actor

- Born: Gilbert L. Hartzog; August 22, 1946; Concord, Michigan, U.S.
- Died: November 25, 1991 (aged 45); Albion, Michigan, U.S.

Comedy career
- Medium: Stand-up, television, film
- Genres: Character comedy, observational comedy, satire, political satire, black comedy, sarcasm
- Subjects: American culture, sex, everyday life, drugs, human behavior, American politics, pop culture

Ollie Joe Prater (born Gilbert Hartzog; August 22, 1946 – November 25, 1991) was an American stand-up comedian and television personality. He made frequent appearances on The Tonight Show.

== Career ==
Prater got his start in stand-up comedy in the 1970s at The Comedy Store and eventually performed in comedy clubs throughout the United States and was a featured performer at many Las Vegas casinos. Prater acted in the 1977 film Can I Do It... 'Til I Need Glasses? that featured Robin Williams in his first film performance. Prater went on to release comedy video specials and albums.

== Death ==
Prater died from complications of a stroke on November 25, 1991.

== Discography ==
- The Best of Ollie Joe Prater (1991) Laughing Hyena Records
