= Freddy Soto =

American comedian (1970–2005)

- Born: Alfredo Soto Jr. June 22, 1970; El Paso, Texas, U.S.
- Died: July 10, 2005 (aged 35); Los Angeles, California, U.S.
- Occupations: Comedian; writer; actor
- Spouse: "Princess Cory" Comeaux-Soto (married 2001–)

Alfredo Soto Jr. (June 22, 1970 – July 10, 2005) was an American comedian, writer and actor. His comedy act focused primarily on his upbringing in a Mexican American household.

== Life and career ==
He was born in El Paso, Texas to Mexican parents. Soto moved to Los Angeles around 1990 and worked as a limousine driver for comedian Richard Pryor. He later worked as a doorman at The Comedy Store in West Hollywood, California. Before long, Soto was headlining comedy clubs across the country.

In 2000, a situation comedy was developed starring Soto. In 2001 and 2002, Soto toured as part of "The Three Amigos" with Carlos Mencia and Pablo Francisco. He had his own comedy specials on Home Box Office and Comedy Central Presents and had guest spots on The Tonight Show with Jay Leno and The Late Late Show with Craig Kilborn. In 2004, Soto had a role in the movie Spanglish starring Adam Sandler.

== Death ==
On July 10, 2005, Soto performed at The Laugh Factory in Los Angeles. Just hours after the performance, he died in his sleep at a friend's house. His cause of death was later determined to be a drug overdose. Fentanyl was one of the drugs involved in his death. Funeral services were held at Forest Lawn Memorial-Park, Hollywood Hills, followed by a memorial service at The Comedy Store. He was survived by his wife "Princess Cory" Comeaux-Soto, who had helped Mitzi Shore run The Comedy Store, and their daughter Cruz Soto.

== Filmography ==
Year	Title	Role	Notes
1995	Night Canvas	Lab Technician	
2003	Pauly Shore Is Dead	Richardson	
2003	Deadly Swarm	Charlie	
2004	Spanglish	Manuel	
