= Carlos Mencia: New Territory =

Live album by Carlos Mencia
- Released: 2011
- Recorded: 2011
- Genre: Comedy

Carlos Mencia: New Territory is a comedy album and Comedy Central special by Honduran comedian Carlos Mencia recorded and released in 2011.

== Track listing ==
1. Intro – 0:46
2. What Happened to Us Mexicans? – 1:28
3. Hispanic at the Disco – 3:50
4. Mexicans at the Cookout – 2:43
5. Mexican Christmas – 2:07
6. JFK Would Have Been Hispanic - 8:30
7. The 46 Types of Mexicans – 75:26
8. Mexican Halloween – 10:58
9. If The Avengers Happened in Honduras – 0:59
10. Mexican Hanukkah – 1:03
11. George Lopez Is Pissed Off At Me – 2:16
12. Mexican Chinese New Year – 0:48
13. Outro – 13:30
