= Brett Harvey (Canadian director) =

Canadian film director and cinematographer

Brett Harvey is a Canadian film director and cinematographer hailing from Vancouver, British Columbia.

His directorial debut, The Union: The Business Behind Getting High, was awarded "Best Canadian Documentary" at the 2007 Edmonton International Film Festival, an award sponsored by the National Film Board.

His sequel, The Culture High, premiered in the 2014 Cinéfest Sudbury International Film Festival and won "Best Documentary" at the 2015 AMPIA Awards. In 2016 Brett directed and wrote the feature documentary Ice Guardians Ice Guardians was listed in Newsweek's "Favorite Documentaries Of 2016". and Sports Illustrated's "Best Of Film" in 2016. The film went on to be nominated for four Rosie Awards in 2017 including "Best Documentary Over 30 minutes" and nominated for two "Leo Awards" including "Best Feature Documentary" & "Best Director". Brett then went on to direct the feature documentary, Inmate #1: The Rise of Danny Trejo, which started its world film festival circuit in 2019 and won the "Audience Choice" Award for 'Best Canadian Documentary' and 'Best Overall Film', placing #1 in the 'Overall Top 10 Feature Films Rankings' list at the Calgary International Film Festival. His latest documentary Breaking Olympia: The Phil Heath Story, a co-production with Dwayne 'The Rock' Johnson, was nominated for five Leo Awards, including "Best Feature Documentary" & "Best Director", four Rosie Awards, and "Best Documentary" at the National Film Awards in the UK.

== Filmography ==
- The Union: The Business Behind Getting High- 2007 - Director & Writer
- The Culture High - 2014 - Director & Writer
- Ice Guardians - 2016 - Director & Writer
- Inmate #1: The Rise of Danny Trejo - 2019 - Director & Writer
- Breaking Olympia: The Phil Heath Story - 2024 - Director & Writer
