= Dark Side of Comedy =

Vice Media documentary television series

- Genre: Docuseries
- Narrated by: Dave Foley
- Country of origin: United States
- No. of seasons: 2
- No. of episodes: 20

Original release
- Network: Vice TV
- Release: August 16, 2022 – December 19, 2023

Dark Side of Comedy is an American documentary series that premiered on Vice TV August 16, 2022. VICE renewed the series for a second season, which premiered on October 17, 2023.

== Summary ==
Narrated by Dave Foley, it features cautionary tales that are mainly about the lives and/or deaths of popular comedians.

== Series overview ==
Season	Episodes	Originally released	
Season	Episodes	First released	Last released
1	10	August 16, 2022	October 18, 2022
2	10	October 17, 2023	December 19, 2023

== Episodes ==
=== Season 1 (2022) ===
No. overall	No. in season	Title	Subject(s)	Original release date	Viewers (millions)
1	1	"Chris Farley"	Chris Farley	August 16, 2022	N/A
2	2	"Andrew Dice Clay"	Andrew Dice Clay	August 23, 2022	N/A
3	3	"Roseanne Barr"	Roseanne Barr	August 30, 2022	N/A
4	4	"Artie Lange"	Artie Lange	September 6, 2022	N/A
5	5	"Richard Pryor"	Richard Pryor	September 13, 2022	N/A
6	6	"Dustin Diamond"	Dustin Diamond	September 20, 2022	N/A
7	7	"Greg Giraldo"	Greg Giraldo	September 27, 2022	N/A
8	8	"Brett Butler"	Brett Butler	October 4, 2022	N/A
9	9	"Freddie Prinze"	Freddie Prinze	October 11, 2022	N/A
10	10	"Maria Bamford"	Maria Bamford	October 18, 2022	N/A

=== Season 2 (2023) ===
No. overall	No. in season	Title	Subject(s)	Original release date	Viewers (millions)
11	1	"Robin Williams"	Robin Williams	October 17, 2023	N/A
12	2	"Sam Kinison"	Sam Kinison	October 24, 2023	N/A
13	3	"Joan Rivers"	Joan Rivers	October 31, 2023	N/A
14	4	"Carlos Mencia"	Carlos Mencia	November 7, 2023	N/A
15	5	"Phil Hartman"	Phil Hartman	November 14, 2023	N/A
16	6	"Tracy Morgan"	Tracy Morgan	November 21, 2023	N/A
17	7	"Family Matters"	The 90s sitcom Family Matters	November 28, 2023	N/A
18	8	"Ellen DeGeneres"	Ellen DeGeneres	December 5, 2023	N/A
19	9	"Norm MacDonald"	Norm Macdonald	December 12, 2023	N/A
20	10	"Gilda Radner"	Gilda Radner	December 19, 2023	N/A
