= Mitzi Shore =

American comedy club owner (1930–2018)

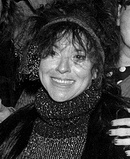
- Shore in the 1980s
- Born: Lillian Saidel; July 25, 1930; Marinette, Wisconsin, U.S.
- Died: April 11, 2018 (aged 87); West Hollywood, California, U.S.
- Occupation: Comedy club owner
- Spouse: Sammy Shore (m. 1950; div. 1974)
- Children: 4, including Pauly Shore

Mitzi Shore (born Lillian Saidel; July 25, 1930 – April 11, 2018) was an American comedy club owner. Her husband, Sammy Shore, co-founded The Comedy Store in 1972 and she became its owner two years later. Through the club, she had a huge influence on the careers of up-and-coming comedians.

== Early life ==
Shore was born Lillian Saidel in Marinette, Wisconsin, on July 25, 1930, the daughter of Jewish parents Fanny and Morris Saidel. Her father was a traveling salesman. She attended Green Bay East High School. She later studied art at the University of Wisconsin–Madison, but dropped out to marry Sammy Shore after meeting him in 1950.

== Career ==
=== Overview ===
Shore's husband Sammy co-founded The Comedy Store in 1972 alongside screenwriter and actor Rudy De Luca. When Sammy and Mitzi divorced in 1974, Mitzi acquired complete ownership as part of their divorce settlement. Sammy was later quoted in 2003 by the Los Angeles Times as explaining that he "relinquished control of the club to lower his alimony payments". Shortly after she took full control, Shore obtained a significant cash loan from comedian Shecky Greene to help ensure continued operations. She was not only involved in day-to-day management but also in the recruitment and development of talent, aided by "Princess Cory" Comeaux-Soto.

Comedians who have been associated with the Comedy Store include Roseanne Barr, Bill Burr, Jim Carrey, Chevy Chase, Andrew Dice Clay, Joey Diaz, Whoopi Goldberg, Bobcat Goldthwait, Tony Hinchcliffe, Sam Kinison, Bobby Lee, Jay Leno, David Letterman, Sebastian Maniscalco, Marc Maron, Carlos Mencia, Joe Rogan, Jerry Seinfeld, Garry Shandling, Yakov Smirnoff, Freddy Soto, Duncan Trussell, Robin Williams, and John Witherspoon.

=== 1979 strike and picket ===
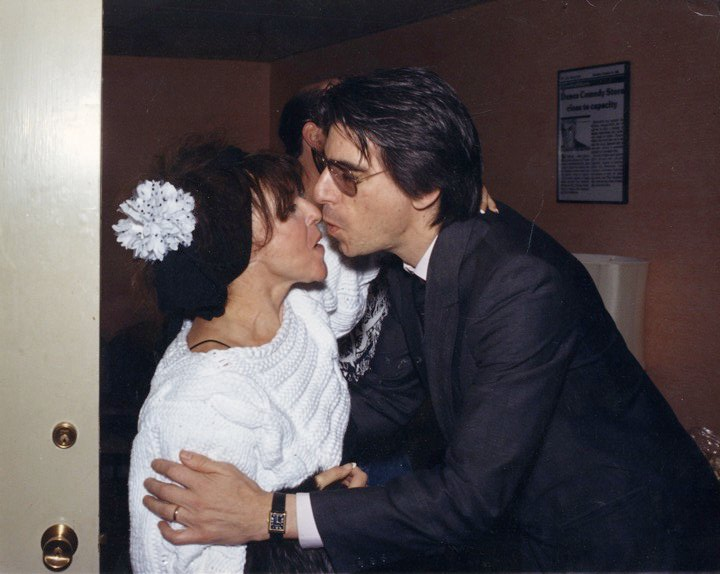
Shore with Richard Belzer at the Comedy Store

Shore refused to pay comics who performed in her club, insisting that the venue was a sort of "college of comedy" where comedians learned their craft rather than a money-making enterprise. However, in 1979, after the club had been expanded extensively, comedians began to insist that they be paid for their work. Shore refused and the performers picketed the establishment in what became a bitter six-week strike action. Among those involved in leading the strike were Jay Leno, Tom Dreesen, and the club's MC David Letterman.

After several months of picketing, and an incident in which Leno was injured by a car attempting to rush the picket line, Shore relented after Budd Friedman from The Improv decided to start paying comics. She then agreed to pay talent $15 (an amount equal to $67 today) per set. The events in L.A. set a precedent that resulted in New York City comedy clubs beginning to pay their talent as well, and other comedy clubs across the U.S. followed suit by paying comics to perform.

=== Belly Room ===
As early as 1978, Shore had converted the upstairs section of The Comedy Store into the Belly Room: a 50-seat audience for which she exclusively booked female comedians. At the time, professional comedy was very much a "boys' club", and bookings for female comedians were rare; opportunities for women to perform their own stand-up material with the most popular comics in the U.S. were unheard of.

Shore's liberal risk-taking with booking talent continued for decades. In the 1990s, once female comics had become more established, Shore continued to cross boundaries with her audience by creating specialty nights for Latino, gay and lesbian performers. She was also instrumental in providing a space for Black American comics in Los Angeles. Phat Tuesday's became a staple in the Black comedy scene and was the start of many of today's favorite comics.

== Depictions in media ==
The character Goldie on the Showtime series I'm Dying Up Here is based loosely on Shore.

== Personal life ==
Shore and her husband Sammy were married in 1950 and divorced in 1974. They had four children: sons Peter, Scott, and Pauly, and daughter Sandi.

== Death ==
On April 11, 2018, at the age of 87, Shore died of an undisclosed neurological disorder at a hospice in West Hollywood, California. She had been suffering from Parkinson's disease in her later years.

Joe Rogan dedicated his 2018 comedy special Strange Times to Shore following her death earlier in the year. Rogan also named the bar at his comedy club, Comedy Mothership, after Shore.
