= Loco Slam (TV series) =

Television series

- Genre: Stand-up comedy
- Created by: Russell Simmons; Bob Sumner
- Directed by: Stan Lathan
- Presented by: Carlos Mencia
- Country of origin: United States
- Original language: English
- No. of seasons: 2

Production
- Camera setup: Single camera
- Running time: 30 minutes
- Production companies: Brillstein-Grey Communications; Russell Simmons Television; HBO

Original release
- Network: HBO

Related
- All Def Comedy

Loco Slam is an HBO television series produced by Russell Simmons, Stan Lathan, and Bob Sumner. The series was hosted by Carlos Mencia in its first two seasons.

== Reception ==
The show gained a mixed reviews from critics.
