= Joe Rogan Questions Everything =

American television series

- Genre: Entertainment
- Narrated by: Joe Rogan
- Country of origin: United States
- Original language: English
- No. of seasons: 1
- No. of episodes: 6

Production
- Executive producers: Joe Rogan; Arthur Smith; Kent Weed; Frank Sinton; Michael Braverman; Tod Mesirow; Barry Bloom; Jeff Sussman; Chandra Keyes
- Producers: A. Smith & Co. Productions
- Camera setup: Multiple
- Running time: 42 minutes
- Production companies: A. Smith & Co. Production

Original release
- Network: Syfy
- Release: July 24 – September 25, 2013

Joe Rogan Questions Everything is an American television series that premiered on SyFy in 2013. The series followed entertainer and stand-up comedian Joe Rogan, as well as co-host Duncan Trussell, as they investigated claims about paranormal and mysterious subjects like Bigfoot, psychic ability and UFOs. The show was cancelled after one six-episode season.

== Premise ==
The show was described as a "comedy/reality/debunking series" as well as a "visual podcast show", and was similar in content to Rogan's podcast: "if you've ever listened to Rogan's podcast, The Joe Rogan Experience, you know the kind of stuff this show will be focusing on". It explored topics like paranormal experiences and encounters. The show's form was based on a presentation of the topic following up with interviews with experts and members of the public that claimed anecdotal evidence for the cases. Various field research trips were also done in an attempt to gather evidence. In the episode "RoboSapien" Joe Rogan interviews Ray Kurzweil with comedian Duncan Trussell appearing as a co-host.

Through the series, Joe Rogan took the position of a skeptic, with the Mansfield News-Journal saying that he "brings a helpful blend — sometimes skeptical, often hopeful and open-minded". The show was loosely based on conversations and topics from the Joe Rogan Experience, with some video out-takes. Some topic presentations and general discussions were set in a podcast studio. Joe Rogan Questions Everything was produced by A. Smith & Co.Productions.

== Reception ==
Joe Rogan Questions Everything was SyFy's most watched reality premiere in more than five months, averaging 1.3 million total viewers. It received mixed reviews from critics.

== Episodes ==
No.	Air date	Title	Synopsis
1	July 24, 2013	Bigfoot DNA	Is Bigfoot real? Joe Rogan research evidence for the existence of the Sasquatch aka. Bigfoot and goes hiking looking for him.
2	August 14, 2013	Weaponized Weather	Is there a big shadow government secretly weaponizing the weather systems? Joe Rogan researches chemtrails and HAARP.
3	August 21, 2013	Robosapien	Will future innovations make man into machine? Joe Rogan looks into the idea of Robo-Sapiens, that the continuation of human evolution is merging man and machine. Topics include downloading the brain and living forever as the body is replaced.
4	September 11, 2013	Biopocalypse	Can a viral outbreak cause a worldwide apocalypse? Joe Rogan looks at the issue of mutated virus outbreaks, underground labs and their potential to kill all of mankind.
5	September 18, 2013	Real Close Encounters	Do UFOs really exist? Joe Rogan researches UFO evidence in the form of implants and anecdotal evidence of cattle mutilations, close encounters, backwards engineering of alien spacecraft and a government cover-up. Joe and Duncan go to Skinwalker ranch to look for UFOs.
6	September 25, 2013	Psychic Spies	Do psychics really exist? Joe Rogan investigates claims of psychic ability and performs tests on himself. He meets with a mentalist who shows him how easily the mind can be deceived.
