= Jeff Wayne (comedian) =

American comedian

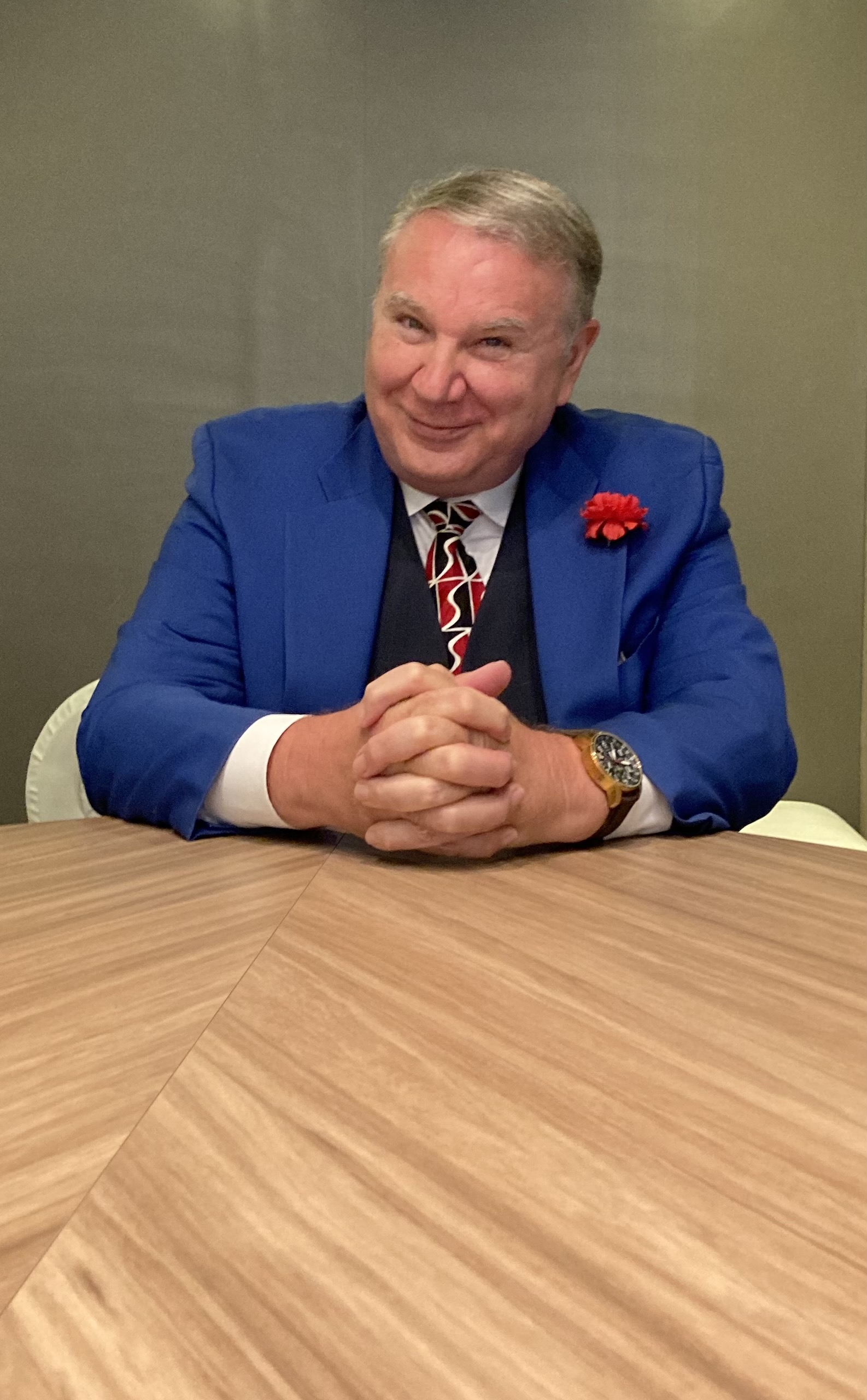
- Born: Kentucky, USA

Comedy career
- Years active: 1990s-present
- Genre: stand-up comedy
- Website: http://jeffbigdaddywayne.com/

Jeff "Big Daddy" Wayne got the "Big Daddy" nickname from Robin Williams and Billy Crystal when they introduced him on HBO's Comic Relief. The Big Daddy identity comes from a one-man show Wayne wrote and performed over 1,000 times in theaters across the country, Big Daddy's Barbeque".

Like many comedians, Jeff packed his bags many years ago and headed from Kentucky to California to join the World-Famous Comedy Store; there was no plan "B." It paid off big time for Jeff. He's performed all over the world in clubs, concerts, casinos, cruise ships and on TV, including a TV pilot that was created from his persona and act, for NBC.

With career spanning performances alongside the likes of Tiffany Haddish, Sheryl Crow, Judd Apatow, Byron Allen and B.B. King, Big Daddy's got stories for days. Jeff is a divorced dad of three, a showbiz junkie who collects vintage movie memorabilia. He's working on his 8th comedy CD and has even penned a book about his son's battle with schizophrenia.

His favorite movie quote is from the 1942 classic Sullivan's Travels: "There's a lot to be said for making people laugh. Did you know that's all some people have?" Big Daddy is fighting to keep us laughing—because if they take that away, what's left?

== Filmography ==
Year	Title	Role	Notes
2024	The Actor	Bartender	
2023	Comic's Unleashed with Byron Allen	Comedian, Self	2 Episodes
2022, 2024	Huckabee	Comedian, Self	2 Episodes
2022	Faith Wins	Casino Boss	
2020	Dry Bar Presents: Big Daddy Kick's It	Comedian, Self	Also known as: All Mice Go To Heaven
2019	The Comedy Store Tonight	Comedian, Self	
2017	Pawn Stars	Self	
2014	The Flip Side with Michael Loftus	Comedian, Self	
2009	Judge Joe Brown	Comedian, Self	

== Discography ==
- The Rural Renegade (2022)
- Big Daddy Knows (2020)
- Kentucky Fried Comedy (2017)
- Jokes I Heard On The Golf Course (2010)
- Ship Happens (2009)
- The Jeff Comedy Jam (2008)
- It's Ok to be Right (2004)
- Raconteur (2002)

== Articles ==
- Grilling For Grins, The Minneapolis Star-Tribune, November 14, 1993
- Hot Ticket Comedy: Big Daddy!, Twin Cities Reader, November 2–8, 1993
- Wayne's World, Scene Magazine, Rochester, N.Y., July 1995
- White Whine, The Washington Post, July 20, 1996
- Big Daddy Rocks!, NPR, Derek McGinty, July 22, 1996
- Saucy Humor Makes 'Barbeque' a Success, The Cleveland Plain Dealer, July 10, 1997
- "Big Daddy's Humor" Brings To Hot Issues, Lexington Herald-Leader, August 8, 1997
- "Best Bet? Big Daddy!", Cincinnati Enquirer, August 8, 1997
- "Big Daddy Parties", Hamilton Journal-News, August 15, 1997
- 'Love Boat' Star and Comic Heat Up Grill, The Fresno Bee, May 23, 1999
- Jeff Wayne's One Man Show, Chicago Tribune, April 14, 2000
- This Barbeque is More Like a Roast! Village/Southwest News, November 20, 2001
- Grilling Sacred Cows, Houston Press, November 8–14, 2001
- Out In Right Field, The Wall Street Journal, August 28, 2004
- 3 Republican Jokers, See, Walk Into a ..., The New York Times, August 28, 2004
- A Funny Man, A Funny Face, A Good Time, Entertainer, Laughlin, Nevada June 18, 2008
- Pioneer Playhouse serves up 'Big Daddy's Barbeque', Lexington Herald-Leader, August 27, 2010
