= The Union: The Business Behind Getting High =

- Promotional release poster
- Directed by: Brett Harvey
- Written by: Brett Harvey; Adam Scorgie
- Produced by: Graeme Flannigan; Stephen Green; Adam Scorgie
- Starring: Joe Rogan; Norm Stamper; Chris Bennett; Tommy Chong; Lester Grinspoon
- Cinematography: Brett Harvey
- Edited by: Stephen Green
- Music by: Michael Champion
- Distributed by: Netflix; Entertainment One; SuperChannel; Eagle Entertainment; Lace Media
- Release date: June 8, 2007
- Running time: 104 minutes
- Country: Canada
- Language: English

The Union: The Business Behind Getting High is a 2007 Canadian documentary film directed by Brett Harvey and starring Joe Rogan, Norm Stamper, Chris Bennett, Tommy Chong, and Lester Grinspoon. Its theatrical run was limited to film festivals.

== Synopsis ==
The film explores the growth, sale and trafficking of cannabis. The documentary examines the underground market by interviewing growers, police officers, criminologists, psychologists, economists, doctors, politicians and pop culture icons, revealing how the trade is booming despite being a criminal enterprise. The history of cannabis and the reasons for its present prohibition are discussed, often comparing it to the prohibition of alcohol in the United States in the 1920s, suggesting that gang drug warfare and other negative aspects associated with cannabis are a result of prohibition, not the drug itself.

The gangs that grow and traffic the drugs are likened to those that appeared in major US cities during Prohibition, with the intention of profiting from the sale of illegal alcohol. The film answers many questions about cannabis, including the purported health effects of cannabis use, the gateway drug theory, and what could happen if cannabis was legalized. The film also discusses the medicinal value of the cannabis plant and what the pharmaceutical industry stands to lose from cannabis legalization.

== Release and reception ==
The Union opened in 30 International Film Festivals beginning with the Winnipeg International Film Festival on June 8, 2007. Rotten Tomatoes movie critic, Kevin Carr, stated that "problems with “The Union” stem from the overtly biased nature of the production". Reviews from other critics were more favorable, including a 4 star rating from AMC film critic Pete Croatto who stated "The Union is more like a fiercely intelligent personal essay. And it works.", a 3 star review from USA Today critic Mike Clark, and Jason Buchanan of All Movie Guide called the film "illuminating" and offering "fascinating insight". The film was released on DVD in the US on July 28, 2009 and was screened for Parliament Hill on June 25, 2012.

== Awards ==
- Best Canadian Feature Documentary at The 2007 Edmonton International Film Festival
- Outstanding Documentary Feature at The 2007 Winnipeg International Film Festival
- Best Canadian Documentary at The 2008 Okanagan International Film Festival
- Best Editing at The 2007 Rhode Island International Film Festival
- Nominated for the 2008 Leo Award for Best Overall Sound in a Documentary Program or Series, and Best Sound Editing in a Documentary Program or Series

== Sequel ==
The Culture High is director Brett Harvey's 2014 follow up documentary recognizing changes even since 2007 in culture, policy, and awareness.
