= Ice Guardians =

- Directed by: Brett Harvey
- Written by: Brett Harvey
- Release date: September 12, 2016
- Running time: 108 minutes
- Country: United States
- Language: English

Ice Guardians is a 2016 feature documentary film directed and written by Brett Harvey about ice hockey enforcers.

The film includes interviews with former National Hockey League players including Hall of Famers Chris Chelios, Jarome Iginla, Bobby Hull and Brett Hull. Other players interviewed include Dave Brown, Kelly Chase, Wendel Clark, Glen Cochrane, Riley Cote, Todd Fedoruk, Nick Fotiu, Mitch Fritz, Luke Gazdic, Clark Gillies, Brett Gallant, Eric Godard, Joey Kocur, Zenon Konopka, Steve MacIntyre, Brian McGrattan, Gino Odjick, Colton Orr, Scott Parker, George Parros, Rob Ray, Dave Schultz, Dave Semenko, Zack Stortini, Rick Tocchet and Kevin Westgarth.

== Reception ==
Ice Guardians was included in Sports Illustrated 's "Best Of Film" in 2016. and Newsweek's "Favorite Documentaries Of 2016". The film was nominated for four "Rosie Awards" in 2017 including "Best Documentary Over 30 minutes" and nominated for two "Leo Awards" including "Best Feature Documentary" and "Best Director". The movie has received mostly positive reviews.

== See also ==
- List of films about ice hockey
