= The Culture High =

2014 documentary film

- DVD cover of The Culture High
- Directed by: Brett Harvey
- Written by: Michael Bobroff; Brett Harvey
- Produced by: Adam Scorgie; Michael Bobroff; Don Metz
- Starring: Richard Branson; Snoop Dogg; Joe Rogan; Rufus Hound; Howard Marks; Wiz Khalifa
- Cinematography: Brett Harvey
- Edited by: Stephen Green
- Music by: Steve Badach; Michael Champion
- Release date: September 18, 2014 (Cinefest Sudbury International Film Festival)
- Running time: 120 min
- Language: English

The Culture High is a 2014 feature-length documentary film directed by Brett Harvey. It is about the marijuana prohibition and the war on drugs in United States. It is the sequel of the 2007 The Union: The Business Behind Getting High.

It premiered at the 2014 Cinéfest Sudbury International Film Festival.

The Culture High won Best Documentary and was nominated for Best Screenwriter Non-Fiction, Best Overall Sound and Best Narrator at the 2015 AMPIA Awards. It was also nominated for Best Feature Length Documentary Program, Best Cinematography in a Documentary Program or Series, and Best Picture Editing in a Documentary Program or Series at the 2015 Leo Awards, and for Best Documentary at the 30th Warsaw International Film Festival.

== See also ==
- Cannabis in the United States
- Legal history of cannabis in the United States
