= Carlos Mencia =

American stand-up comedian (born 1967)

Carlos Mencía
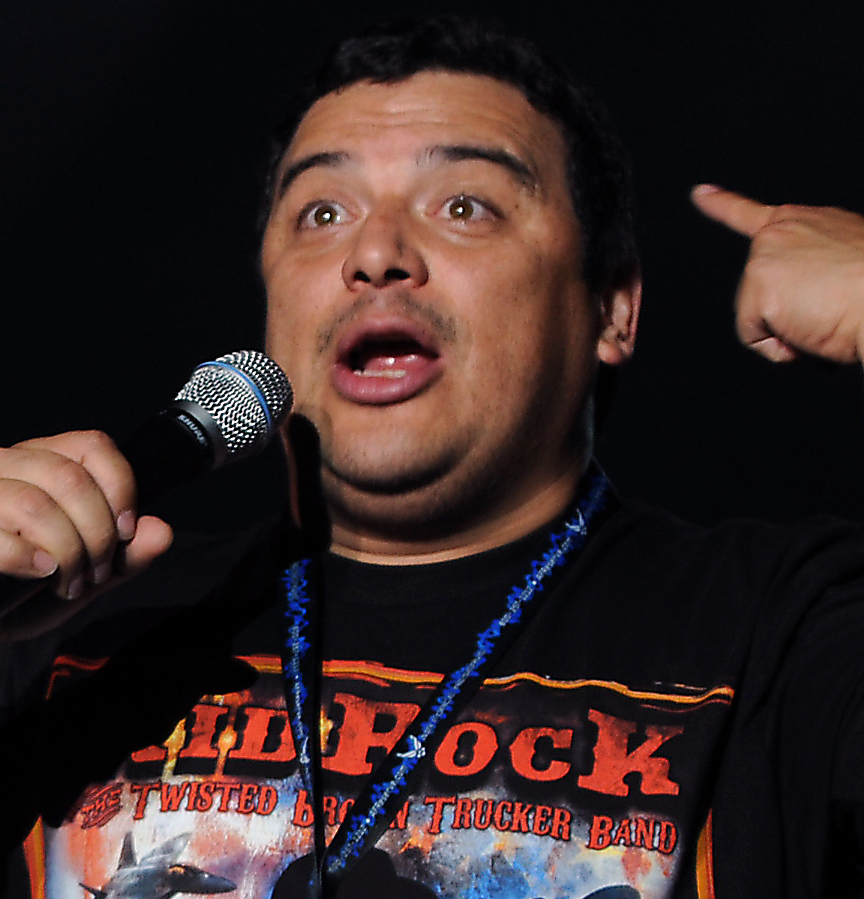
- Mencia performing in December 2009
- Born: Ned Arnel Mencía; October 22, 1967 (age 59); San Pedro Sula, Honduras
- Occupation: Stand-up comedian
- Spouse: Amy Mencia (m. 2003)
- Children: 1

Comedy career
- Years active: 1990–present
- Genres: Observational comedy; black comedy; insult comedy; physical comedy; satire
- Subjects: Latin American culture; race relations; family; everyday life; pop culture; human behavior

Ned Arnel Mencia (born October 22, 1967) known professionally as Carlos Mencía, is a Honduran-American comedian, writer, and actor. His style of comedy is often political and involves issues of race relations, Latin American culture, criminal justice, and social class. From 2005 to 2008, he hosted the Comedy Central show Mind of Mencia. Around the time of the show's cancellation, several comedians accused Mencía of plagiarism and stealing jokes.

== Early life ==
Ned Arnel Holness was born in San Pedro Sula, Honduras on October 22, 1967, to Honduran parents Magdelena Mencia and Roberto Holness. He has 16 older siblings and one younger sibling. At the time of his birth, his mother was engaged in a domestic dispute with his father, and she subsequently refused to give Mencía his biological father's surname. Out of respect for his father, he later began using the Holness surname anyway, and did so until the age of 18. He moved to the U.S. as a child and was raised Catholic in East Los Angeles by his aunt Consuelo and uncle Pablo Mencía. By his own admission, staying out of trouble was difficult while growing up, but his family helped him excel in school and stay out of gangs. He dealt drugs and robbed a house when he was 19 years old. He attended Garfield High School in Los Angeles County, and later majored in electrical engineering at California State University, Los Angeles; however, he dropped out to pursue a career in comedy after a successful performance at an open mic night at The Laugh Factory. In 1988, at the suggestion of the Comedy Store owner Mitzi Shore, he began using the first name "Carlos" to appeal to Mexican audiences.

== Career ==
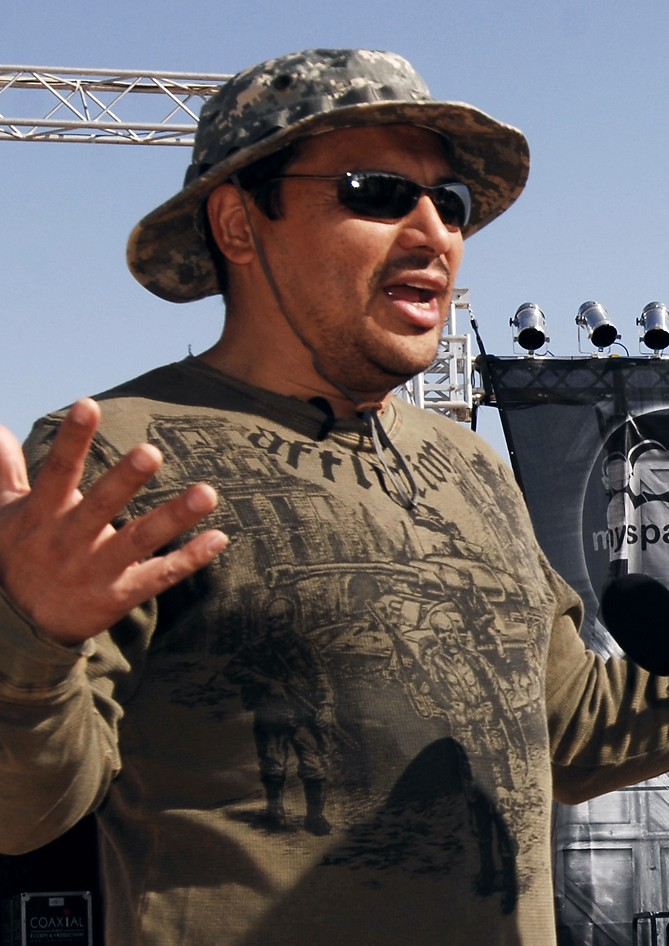
Mencia prior to a live concert at a U.S. Army camp in the Persian Gulf

Mencia performed at venerated LA stand-up venues such as The Comedy Store and The L.A. Cabaret. His success in these venues led to appearances on The Arsenio Hall Show and Buscando Estrellas, where he attained the title "International Comedy Grand Champion." Then, in 1994, Mencia was chosen to host HBO's latino comedy showcase Loco Slam.

Mencia followed up Loco Slam by hosting Funny is Funny! on Galavision in 1998. He would continue to do stand-up, including a successful tour in 2001 with Freddy Soto and Pablo Francisco, "The Three Amigos." Mencia also did two half-hour specials on HBO, the second of which won him a CableACE Award for Best Stand-Up Comedy Special. After the release of his first comedy album by Warner Records, Take A Joke America, Mencia performed his break-out performance on Comedy Central Presents in 2002.

By the time his career began to take off in the early 2000s, Mencia was also working as an actor doing guest appearances in the television shows Moesha and The Shield, and starring in the film Outta Time and the animated show The Proud Family.

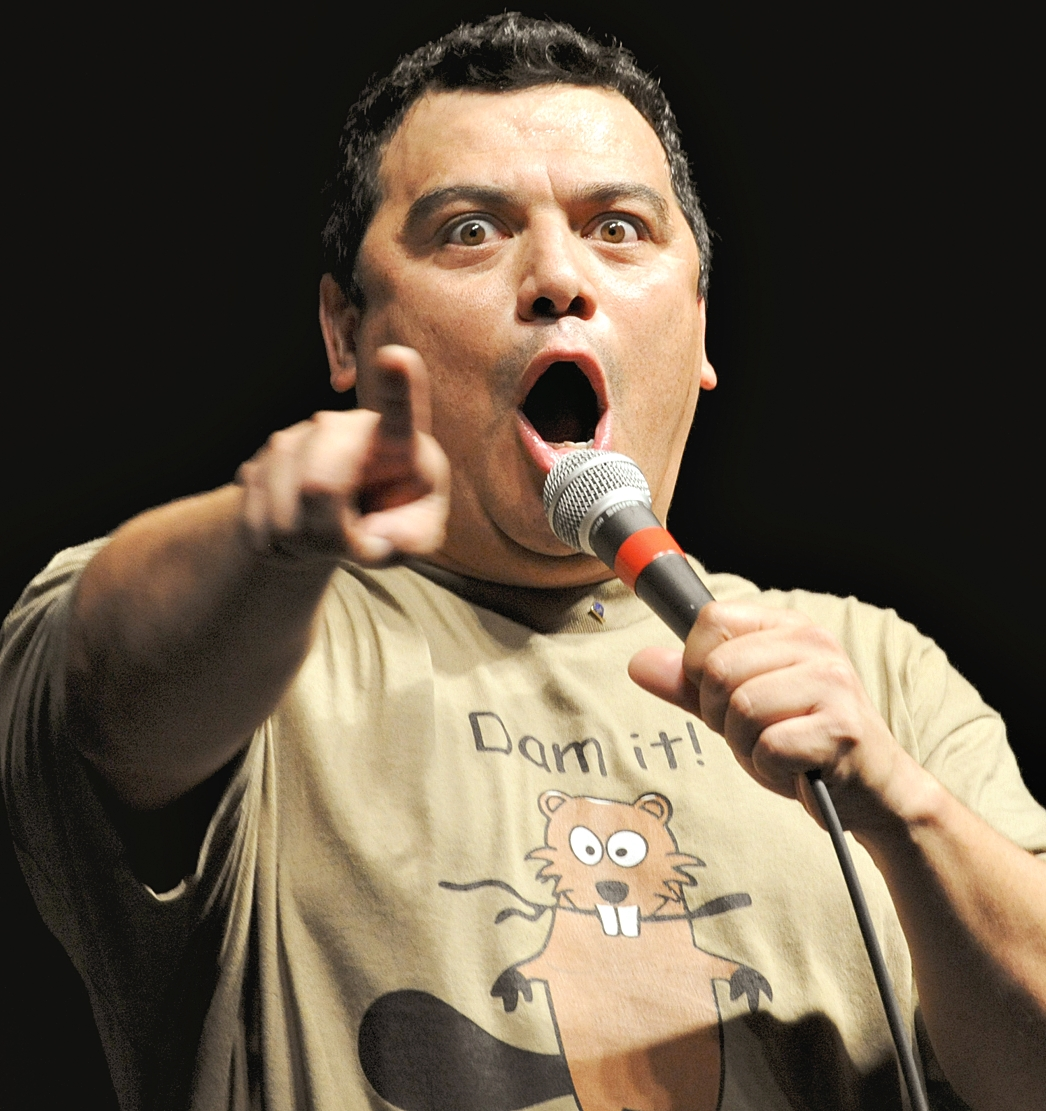
Mencia performing in 2010

In 2002, he performed on Comedy Central Presents. In March 2005, Comedy Central announced Mencia's own half-hour comedy show, Mind of Mencia The show mixed Mencia's stand up comedy with sketch comedy, much like Dave Chappelle's Chappelle's Show. The show achieved moderate success in its first season and was brought back for a second season in the spring of 2006, becoming Comedy Central's second highest-rated program behind South Park. The success of the series prompted Mencia to go a highly publicized arena tour titled "The Punisher Tour" in 2006 The show's third season premiered in early 2007. The series ended in 2008 after four seasons when Mencia decided against filming a fifth season, explaining "It would have felt repetitive and redundant. There's a lot of different doors that are opening for me...I truly have no idea what's next."

Mencia was sometimes a guest on the Opie and Anthony radio show on XM Satellite Radio and CBS Radio. He took part in the first Opie and Anthony's Traveling Virus Comedy Tour in 2006.

Mencia starred in a Super Bowl XLI commercial for Bud Light. In November 2009, Mencia began appearing in commercials for a weight-loss product called Belly Burner.

In 2011, Mencia released his new special Carlos Mencia: New Territory to Comedy Central.

Mencia was a co-founder of the restaurant chain Maggie Rita's, and a co-owner of several locations. By January 2013, Mencia's restaurants had closed amid poor reviews, though one franchised location continued to license the name.

In 2023, Mencia released "Here I Am", his first comedy special in 12 years.

== Controversies ==
=== Public reception ===
In 2006, Maxim named Mencia one of the worst comedians of all time. Mike Byoff of Gawker said of Mencia, "Not only does he steal jokes from classic comedians but he's needlessly racist and had no sense of comedic timing whatsoever."

A 2010 article in The Wall Street Journal noted that Mencia, Dane Cook, and Jay Leno were three of the most popular stand-ups that were hated by fellow comedians.

=== Accusations of plagiarism ===
In 2005, comedian Joe Rogan wrote a post on his website publicly accusing Mencia of being a plagiarist, alleging that Mencia stole jokes from a number of comedians. On February 10, 2007, Mencia confronted Rogan on stage at the Comedy Store on Sunset Boulevard after Rogan referred to him as "Menstealia" while introducing another comedian. The two argued as Rogan accused Mencia of plagiarism - citing multiple examples - which Mencia denied. Rogan posted a video of the altercation, along with audio and video clips from other comedians including George Lopez, Bob Levy, Bobby Lee, and Ari Shaffir. Rogan has also posted audio and video clips of Mencia's interviews and joke routines comparing Mencia's routines to those of other comedians on his blog.

Comedian George Lopez also accused Mencia of plagiarizing his material. In an interview on The Howard Stern Show, Lopez accused Mencia of plagiarizing 13 minutes of his material in Mencia's HBO special. He also claimed he had a physical altercation with Mencia over the alleged plagiarism. The only joke that Lopez has publicly specified was stolen and used on Mencia's HBO special was a Taco Bell joke. Comedian Ted Sarnowski countered this claim, stating that the joke he performed on radio in 1988 was later taken and used without permission by Lopez, the radio station's resident comic. Sarnowski claims to have given Mencia permission to use the joke.

Mencia has also been accused of stealing a routine from Bill Cosby. In his special, No Strings Attached, Mencia performs a bit about a father who spends years training his son for a career as a football player, only to see the son say "I love you, Mom!" at his moment of televised victory. Cosby performed a very similar bit in his concert film Bill Cosby: Himself and wrote briefly on the subject in his book Fatherhood. Mencia told the Los Angeles Times that he had never seen the film but regretted the similarities between his and Cosby's jokes.

Mencia addressed the issue of plagiarism in two hour-long interviews with comic Marc Maron on his podcast, WTF with Marc Maron, in May 2010. In 2011, Mencia stated in an interview that he had been in therapy due to accusations of plagiarism.

=== Tax evasion charges ===
On June 18, 2026, Mencia was arrested and charged with 12 counts of tax evasion owing $300,000 on income totaling $8.7 million by the Los Angeles County District Attorney, Nathan Hochman. He was charged with six counts of failure to file personal income and corporate taxes for the years of 2019 to 2024. Mencia was held on a $250,000 bail and if convicted of the charges, he could face more than 11 years in prison along with tax bills and interest that double the total.

On June 22, Mencia appeared at the Los Angeles County Court in custody, where he plead not guilty to the tax charges. His bail was reduced from $250,000 to $50,000, which was paid, but court documents did not specify if he was released.

== Personal life ==
Mencia married his wife, Amy, in 2003. They reside in Los Angeles and have a son.

In a 2025 interview with DJ Vlad Mencia revealed that he was sexually abused as a child.

== In popular culture ==
Mencia is parodied in "Fishsticks", an April 2009 episode of the animated TV Series South Park, that aired as part of its thirteenth season. In the episode, Mencia takes credit for the "fishsticks" joke that fourth grader Jimmy Valmer actually conceives of and popularizes. When hip hop artist Kanye West is publicly mocked over his inability to understand the joke's punchline, he kidnaps and beats Mencia, who admits that he took credit for the joke because he isn't funny, explaining, "I just take jokes and repackage them with a Mexican accent, man!" Kanye later kills Mencia after he attempts to explain the punchline to him.

In 2023, Mencia was the subject of an episode of the Vice TV documentary series Dark Side of Comedy.

== Filmography ==
=== Film ===
Year	Title	Role	Notes
2002	Outta Time	Juancho	
2002	29 Palms	The Comedian	
2005	The Proud Family Movie	Felix Boulevardez (voice)	TV movie
2007	Farce of the Penguins	Juan Sanchez (voice)	
2007	The Heartbreak Kid	Tito	
2010	Our Family Wedding	Miguel Ramirez	
2021	Pil's Adventures	Graubart (voice)	
2024	Holy Cash	Ex Con Charly	
2026	A Proud Family Wizmas	Felix Boulevardez (voice)	

=== Television ===
Year	Title	Role	Notes
1990	In Living Color	Valet	Episode: "The Black Man's Guide to Understanding the Black Woman"
1992	An Evening at the Improv	Himself	Episode: "Rita Coolidge, Kevin James, Frank Miles, and more!"
1994	Loco Slam	Himself/Host	Episode: "Episode #1.1"
1994–95	HBO Comedy Half-Hour	Himself	Guest Cast: Season 1-2
1995–97	Happily Ever After: Fairy Tales for Every Child	Poncho/Xolotl (voice)	Guest Cast: Season 1-2
1999	Moesha	Himself	Episode: "Life Imitating Art"
2001	The Test	Himself/Panelist	Episode: "The Adventurous Test"
2001	The Bernie Mac Show	Chuy	Episode: "Pilot" & "Now You Got It"
2001–05	The Proud Family	Felix Boulevardez (voice)	Recurring Cast
2002	Comedy Central Presents	Himself	Episode: "Carlos Mencia"
2002	The Shield	Gabo	Episode: "Two Days of Blood"
2004	The Drop	Himself	Episode: "Episode #2.3"
2005	Weekends at the D.L.	Himself	Episode: "Episode #1.11" & "#1.12"
2005–08	Mind of Mencia	Himself/Host	Main Host
2006	Drawn Together	King of Mexico (voice)	Episode: "Captain Hero and the Cool Kids"
2007	Primetime Creative Arts Emmy Awards	Himself/Host	Main Host
2007	MADtv	Himself	Episode: "Episode #13.5"
2009	Make 'Em Laugh: The Funny Business of America	Himself	Episode: "When I'm Bad I'm Better: The Groundbreakers"
2012	Celebrity Ghost Stories	Himself	Episode: "Victoria Rowell/Dot Jones/Carlos Mencia/Linda Blair"
2013–14	Gotham Comedy Club	Himself/Host	Guest Cast: Season 1 & 4
2018	Laugh Factory	Himself	Episode: "Carlos Mencia: La Generación de Milenio"
2021	Down to Business	Himself	Episode: "Various Artists"
2022–23	Dark Side of Comedy	Himself	Recurring Cast
2022–23	The Proud Family: Louder and Prouder	Felix Boulevardez (voice)	Recurring Cast: Season 1-2

== Discography ==
=== Albums ===
- Take a Joke America (2001)
- America Rules (2002)
- Unmerciful (2003)
- Spanglish (2006)

=== Albums and DVDs ===
- Not for the Easily Offended (2003)
- Down to the Nitty Gritty (2004)
- No Strings Attached (2006)
- The Best of Funny is Funny (2007)
- Performance Enhanced (2008)
- Carlos Mencia: New Territory (2011)
