= Joe Rogan =

American podcaster (born 1967)

- Rogan at the White House in 2026
- Born: Joseph James Rogan; August 11, 1967 (age 59); Newark, New Jersey, U.S.
- Occupations: Podcaster; color commentator; comedian; actor; television host
- Years active: 1988–present
- Known for: The Joe Rogan Experience
- Spouse: Jessica Ditzel (m. 2009)
- Children: 3 (1 adopted)

Comedy career
- Medium: Stand-up; podcast; television; film
- Genres: Observational comedy; black comedy; insult comedy; cringe comedy; satire
- Subjects: American culture; American politics; sports; current events; religion; pop culture; recreational drug use

YouTube information
- Channel: PowerfulJRE
- Genre: Podcasting
- Subscribers: 20.9 million
- Views: 6.56 billion
- Last updated: June 16, 2026
- Website: joerogan.com

Joseph James Rogan Jr. (born August 11, 1967) is an American podcaster, sports commentator, comedian, actor, and former television host. Since 2009, he has hosted The Joe Rogan Experience, which is one of the most popular podcasts in the world and has been the most streamed podcast on Spotify as of 2020.

Rogan was born in Newark, New Jersey, and began his career in comedy in 1988 in the Boston area. After relocating to Los Angeles in 1994, he signed an exclusive developmental deal with Disney and appeared as an actor on several television shows, including Hardball and NewsRadio. In 1997, he started working for the UFC as an interviewer and color commentator. He released his first comedy special, I'm Gonna Be Dead Someday..., in 2000 and hosted the game show Fear Factor from 2001 to 2006.

After leaving Fear Factor, Rogan focused on his stand-up career and hosted more comedy specials. He launched The Joe Rogan Experience in 2009; by 2015, it was one of the most popular podcasts in the world, regularly receiving millions of plays per episode. Spotify obtained exclusive distribution rights to The Joe Rogan Experience in 2020 for $200 million. Rogan's audience has since grown significantly, and in 2024, he renewed his deal with Spotify for an estimated $250 million, but will no longer be exclusive to them.

Although not a traditional political figure, significant attention has been given to Rogan's political views and his role as a political influencer. Rogan has voiced support for politicians and stances across the political spectrum, including socially liberal causes such as same-sex marriage, recreational drug legalization and universal health care, while also supporting gun rights and free speech and opposing cancel culture and military adventurism. Rogan has faced criticism for promoting conspiracy theories, COVID-19 misinformation, transphobia, and for hosting guests who spread misinformation and pseudoscience. In the 2024 presidential election, Rogan made a widely covered public endorsement of Donald Trump, though later criticized some of Trump's policies, while continuing to make public appearances with him.

== Early life and education ==
Rogan in a 1985 yearbook

Joseph James Rogan was born in Newark, New Jersey. His paternal grandfather was Irish, while his three other grandparents were all of Italian descent. His parents, James Joseph Rogan Sr. and Susan Lembo, divorced when he was five, and he has not been in contact with his father, an architect, since he was seven. He recalled, "All I remember of my dad are these brief, violent flashes of domestic violence. [...] But I don't want to complain about my childhood. Nothing bad ever really happened to me. I don't hate the guy." At the age of seven, he moved with his mother to San Francisco, California, and when he was 11 they moved to Gainesville, Florida. They later settled in Newton Upper Falls, Massachusetts. He graduated from Newton South High School in 1985.

Rogan participated in Little League Baseball and developed an interest in martial arts in his early teens. He recalled being "terrified of being a loser" as a child and said, "Martial arts gave me not just confidence, but also a different perspective of myself and what I was capable of. I knew that I could do something I was terrified of, and that was really difficult, and that I could excel at it. It was a big deal for me." Martial arts were "the first thing that ever gave me hope that I wasn't going to be a loser. So I really, really gravitated toward it". At age 14, he took up karate and started taekwondo a year later. When he was 19, he won the US Open Championship taekwondo tournament as a lightweight. He was a Massachusetts full-contact state champion for four consecutive years and became a taekwondo instructor. He also practiced amateur kickboxing and held a 2–1 record; he retired from competition at age 21, as he began to suffer from frequent headaches and feared he might sustain worse injuries. He attended the University of Massachusetts Boston but found the endeavor "pointless" and dropped out early.

== Career ==
=== 1988–1994: Early stand-up career ===
I didn't have a direction until I became a stand-up comedian. I was pretty nervous about my future. I couldn't imagine myself working a 9-to-5 job.

— Rogan on his career

Rogan had no intention of being a professional comedian. He was a fan of comedy from a young age, saying of Richard Pryor's 1982 special Live on the Sunset Strip, "It affected me in such a profound way. Nothing had made me laugh like that." His friends from gym and Taekwondo school, whom he would make laugh with impressions and jokes, convinced him to try stand-up. At 21, after six months preparing material and practicing his delivery, he performed his first stand-up routine on August 27, 1988, at an open-mic night at a Stitches comedy club in Boston.

While living in Boston and working on his stand-up, Rogan held several jobs to secure himself financially, including teaching martial arts at Boston University and in nearby Revere, delivering newspapers, driving a limousine, doing construction work, and assisting a private investigator. Meanwhile, his blue comedy style earned him gigs at bachelor parties and strip clubs. One night, he persuaded the owner of a comedy club in Boston to allow him to try a new five-minute routine. At the show was talent manager Jeff Sussman, who liked the act and offered to become his manager, which Rogan accepted.

In 1990, Rogan moved to New York City. As a full-time comedian, he says he was "scratching and grinding" for money and stayed with his grandfather in Newark for the first six months. Rogan later cited Richard Jeni, Lenny Bruce, Sam Kinison, and Bill Hicks as comedy influences.

=== 1994–1999: Hardball and NewsRadio ===
In 1994, Rogan relocated to Los Angeles, and shortly thereafter had his first national television spot on the MTV comedy show Half-Hour Comedy Hour. The appearance led to the network offering him a three-year exclusive contract and a role in a pilot episode of a "dopey game show" for $500. Rogan declined, but it prompted Sussman to send tapes of Rogan's performances to several networks, which sparked a bidding war. After a period of negotiation, Rogan accepted a development deal with the Disney network. He secured his first major acting role in the 1994 nine-episode Fox sitcom Hardball as Frank Valente, a young, egocentric star player on a professional baseball team. Rogan called the hiring process "weird", as the network had no idea if he could act until he was asked by Dean Valentine, then-president of Walt Disney Television, to whom he replied: "If you can lie, you can act, and if you can lie to crazy girlfriends, you can act under pressure". The filming schedule was a new experience for Rogan, who started to work 12-hour days. Rogan later said: "It was a great show on paper until a horrible executive producer with a big ego was hired by Fox to run the show and he rewrote it". Around this time, Rogan began performing at The Comedy Store in Hollywood and was hired as a paid regular by owner Mitzi Shore. According to Rogan, he performed at the club for the next 13 years for free and paid for the venue's new sound system.

From 1995 to 1999, Rogan starred in the NBC sitcom NewsRadio as Joe Garrelli, an electrician and handyman at the show's fictional news radio station. The role was originally set to be played by actor Ray Romano, but Romano was let go from the cast after one rehearsal and Rogan was brought in. The switch caused Rogan to work with the show's writers to help develop the character before the show was set to launch, which he later described as a "very dumbed-down, censored version" of himself. Rogan befriended fellow cast member Phil Hartman, who confided his marital problems to him. Rogan claimed he tried to persuade Hartman to divorce his wife five times, but "he loved his kids and didn't want to leave". In 1998, Hartman was murdered by his wife. The loss affected Rogan's ability to perform stand-up, and he canceled a week of scheduled gigs. Rogan later saw acting as an easy job, but grew tired of "playing the same character every week", and only did so for the money. He later viewed his time on NewsRadio as "a dream gig" that allowed him to earn money while working on his stand-up as often as he could. During the series, he worked on a pilot for a show entitled Overseas.

=== 1997–2006: UFC commentator and Fear Factor ===
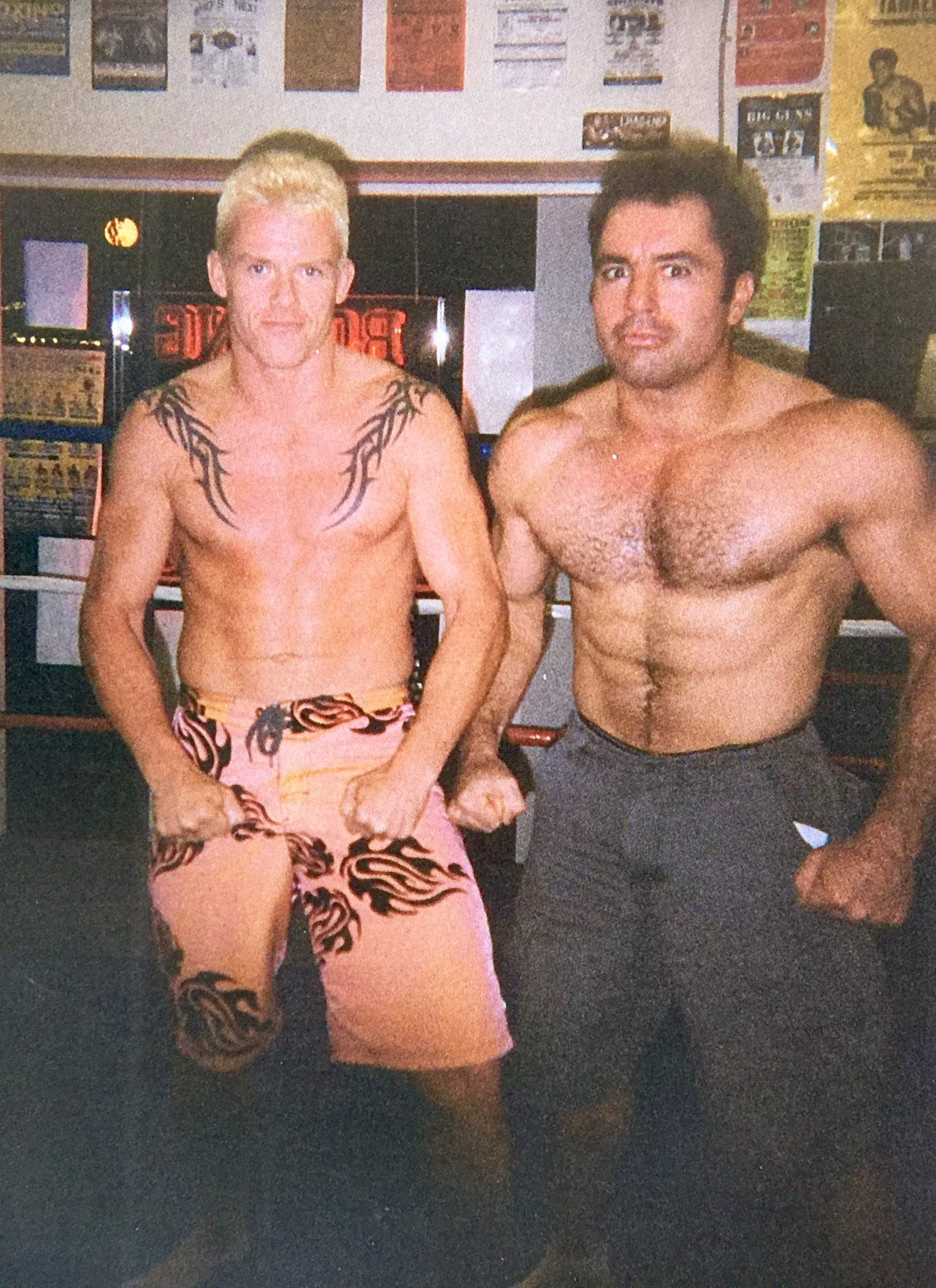
Gerald Strebendt (left) posing with Rogan in a boxing ring, 2002

Rogan began working for the mixed martial arts promotion Ultimate Fighting Championship (UFC) as a backstage and post-fight interviewer. His first show took place at UFC 12: Judgement Day in Dothan, Alabama, on February 7, 1997. He became interested in Brazilian jiu-jitsu in 1994 after watching Royce Gracie fight at UFC 2: No Way Out, and landed the position at the organization as Sussman was friends with its co-creator and original producer, Campbell McLaren. He quit after two years as his salary could not cover the cost of traveling to the events, which were often held in rural locations.

After the UFC was taken over by Zuffa in 2001, Rogan attended some events and became friends with its new president Dana White, who offered him a job as a color commentator. However, Rogan initially declined as he "just wanted to go to the fights and drink". In 2002, White was able to hire Rogan for free in exchange for prime event tickets for him and his friends. After about 15 free gigs as a commentator, Rogan accepted pay for the job, working alongside Mike Goldberg until the end of 2016. Rogan won the Wrestling Observer Newsletter Award for Best Television Announcer twice, and was named MMA Personality of the Year four times by the World MMA Awards.

In 1999, Rogan secured a three-album deal with Warner Bros. Records and began tentative plans to star in his own prime-time televised sitcom on Fox named The Joe Rogan Show. The show, co-written by Seinfeld writer Bill Masters, was to feature Rogan as "a second-string sportscaster who lands a spot as the token male on a View-style women's show". In December 1999, he recorded his first stand-up comedy album in two shows at the Comedy Connection at Faneuil Hall in Boston, which was released as I'm Gonna Be Dead Some Day... in August 2000. It received national exposure on The Howard Stern Show and downloads from Napster. "Voodoo Punanny", a song Rogan wrote after Warner suggested to produce a song they could play on the radio, was subsequently released as a single. Around this time, Rogan also worked on ideas for a film and a cartoon with his comedian friend Chris McGuire, and began to operate a blog on his website, JoeRogan.net, which he used to discuss various topics that helped him develop his stand-up routines.

In 2001, the development of Rogan's television show was interrupted after he accepted an offer from NBC to host the American edition of Fear Factor. He declined initially as he thought NBC would not air such a program due to its content, but Sussman convinced him to accept. Rogan later said that the main reason he accepted was to obtain observations and anecdotes for his stand-up comedy. The show increased Rogan's national exposure which caused turnouts at his stand-up gigs to grow. Fear Factor ran for an initial six seasons from 2001 to 2006.

Rogan's role as host of Fear Factor led to further television opportunities. In 2002, he appeared on the episode "A Beautiful Mind" of Just Shoot Me as Chris, the boyfriend of lead character Maya Gallo. In December 2002, Rogan was the emcee for the 2002 Blockbuster Hollywood Spectacular, a Christmas parade in Hollywood. In February 2003, Rogan became the new co-host of The Man Show on Comedy Central for its fifth season from August 2003, with fellow comedian Doug Stanhope, following the departure of original hosts Jimmy Kimmel and Adam Carolla. A year into the show, however, the hosts entered disagreements with Comedy Central and the show's producers over content. Rogan recalled: "I was a little misled ... I was told: 'Show nudity, and we'll blur it out. Swear and we'll bleep it out.' That hasn't been the case". The show ended in 2004. Around this time Rogan entered talks to host his own radio show, but they came to nothing due to his already busy schedule.

=== 2005–2009: Comedy specials ===
Rogan commentating for the UFC in 2006

In 2005, actor Wesley Snipes challenged Rogan to a cage fight. Rogan trained for the event for five months before Snipes backed out following an investigation by the IRS for alleged tax evasion. Rogan believed Snipes needed a quick payout to alleviate his debt.

After Fear Factor, Rogan focused his career on his stand-up comedy, as concentrating on television had made him feel lazy and uninspired to work on new material for his act. With the money he had earned from television, Rogan hired two people full-time to film him and his comedy friends on tour, and release clips on his website for his JoeShow web series. In May 2005, Rogan signed a deal with the Endeavor Talent Agency. Two months later, he filmed his second stand-up comedy special, Joe Rogan: Live, in Phoenix, Arizona. The special premiered on Showtime in 2007.

In 2005, Rogan wrote a blog entry on his website accusing comedian Carlos Mencia of joke thievery, a claim he had made since 1993. The situation culminated in February 2007 when Rogan confronted Mencia on stage at The Comedy Store in Hollywood. A video of the incident was uploaded onto YouTube and included evidence and comments from other comedians, including George Lopez, "The Reverend" Bob Levy, Bobby Lee, and Ari Shaffir. The incident led to Rogan's talent agent expelling him as a client of The Gersh Agency, who also managed Mencia, and his ban from The Comedy Store, causing him to relocate his regular venue to the Hollywood Improv Comedy Club. Rogan later said that every comic he had talked to was happy and thankful that he did it, and went on to sign with William Morris Agency.

In April 2007, Comedy Central Records released Rogan's fourth comedy special, Shiny Happy Jihad. The set was recorded in September 2006 at Cobb's Comedy Club in San Francisco, and contains excerpts of an improvized Q&A session with the audience that was typical of Rogan's act at the time.

=== 2009–present: Latest endeavors and podcast ===
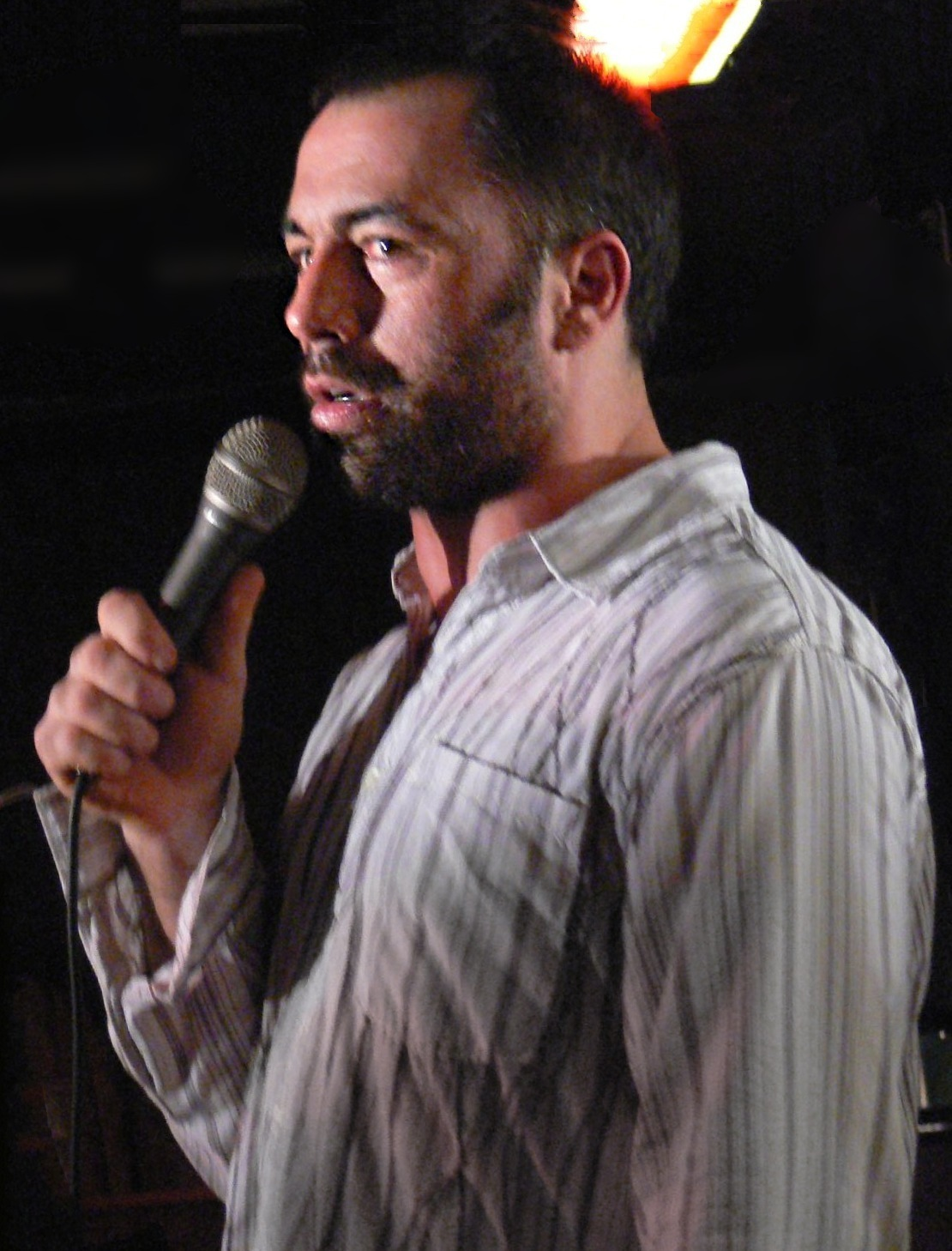
Rogan performing stand-up in 2011

Rogan hosted the short-lived CBS show Game Show in My Head, which aired for eight episodes in January 2009. It was produced by Ashton Kutcher. The show involved contestants who try to convince people to perform or take part in increasingly bizarre situations for money. He agreed to host the show as the idea intrigued him, calling it "a completely mindless form of entertainment".

In 2010, Rogan accused comedian Dane Cook of joke thievery.

In 2011, Rogan resumed his role as Fear Factor host for its seventh and final season (until 2012). Rogan took the job, saying he "would hate to see somebody else do it". Later in 2011, Rogan played his first major film character, Gale, in the comedy film Zookeeper. He was also working on a book around this time that he tentatively titled Irresponsible Advice from a Man with No Credibility, based on his blog entries on his website. Rogan played himself in Here Comes the Boom, another action-comedy film starring Kevin James that was released in 2012.

In December 2012, Rogan released his sixth comedy special Live from the Tabernacle exclusively as a download on his website for $5, following Louis C.K.'s example.

In 2013, Rogan hosted the television show Joe Rogan Questions Everything on the SyFy network, which aired for six episodes. The show covered topics discussed on his podcasts, including the existence of Bigfoot and UFOs, and featured several comedians, experts, and scientists with the aim of trying to "put some subjects to bed ... with an open-minded perspective". SyFy agreed to produce the show without a pilot episode. The production team gave Rogan some creative control over the program and aimed to present it in his own words where possible.

==== The Joe Rogan Experience ====
In December 2009, Rogan launched a free podcast with his friend and fellow comedian Brian Redban. The first episode was recorded on December 24 and was to be a live weekly broadcast on Ustream, with Rogan and Redban "sitting in front of laptops bullshitting". By August 2010, the podcast was named The Joe Rogan Experience and entered the list of Top 100 podcasts on iTunes and in 2011, was picked up by SiriusXM Satellite Radio. The podcast features an array of guests who discuss current events, politics, philosophy, comedy, hobbies, and numerous other topics. By January 2015, the podcast reached over 11 million monthly downloads. By October that year, the podcast was downloaded 16 million times each month, making it one of the most popular free podcasts.

On May 19, 2020, Rogan announced that he had signed a multiyear licensing deal with Spotify worth an estimated $200 million, making it one of the largest licensing agreements in the podcast business. The deal made The Joe Rogan Experience available on Spotify starting September 1, 2020, and exclusive on the platform from January 2021. The podcast is available with both audio and video within the Spotify app and video is no longer streamed or uploaded to YouTube. The podcasts are typically released one day after recording, to allow time for the producers to make clips of the podcast. Clips from the video version will continue to be available on YouTube. In February 2022, Spotify removed 113 episodes of The Joe Rogan Experience over the course of a few days owing in part to some of the episodes having been perceived to have racist and insensitive language.

In February 2022, singer India Arie shared a compilation of Rogan saying the racial slur "nigger" on The Joe Rogan Experience on Instagram. Rogan apologized, calling his past language "regretful and shameful" while also saying that the clips were taken out of context and that he only quoted the slur to discuss its use by others. The footage in question was first published by the political action committee PatriotTakes, an affiliate of the liberal PAC MeidasTouch. This resulted in allegations of a defamation attempt by MeidasTouch, which the founders denied in an interview with Barstool Sports founder Dave Portnoy, instead attributing the source of the footage to Alex Jones who was a recurring guest on Rogan's show. Rogan described the video compilation as a "political hit job". A number of UFC fighters, including Israel Adesanya, Terrance McKinney, Michael Chandler, Aljamain Sterling, Frankie Edgar, Darren Till, Marlon Vera, Ben Askren, and Brendan Schaub, defended Rogan.

Spotify had refused to carry 42 episodes of the podcast when it acquired the exclusive rights. Spotify says it spoke to Rogan about his "history of using some racially insensitive language", and it says (in an internal memo) that Rogan selected 70 episodes which were removed on February 4, 2022, all of which pre-date the COVID-19 pandemic.

In early 2022, the video platform Rumble offered Rogan $100 million to switch from Spotify. Variety reported that Rogan had declined the offer.

In December 2024, Spotify confirmed that The Joe Rogan Experience was the top podcast on its platform for a fifth consecutive year.

==== Onnit ====
Rogan is a co-founder of the supplements and fitness company Onnit, which was sold to Unilever in 2021. Rogan frequently advertises for Onnit products on his podcast. In April 2024 a lawsuit was filed against Onnit, alleging that its 'Alpha BRAIN' supplement performed no better than a placebo in a clinical study and that the product was surrounded by "false, misleading and deceptive advertising".

==== Comedy Mothership ====
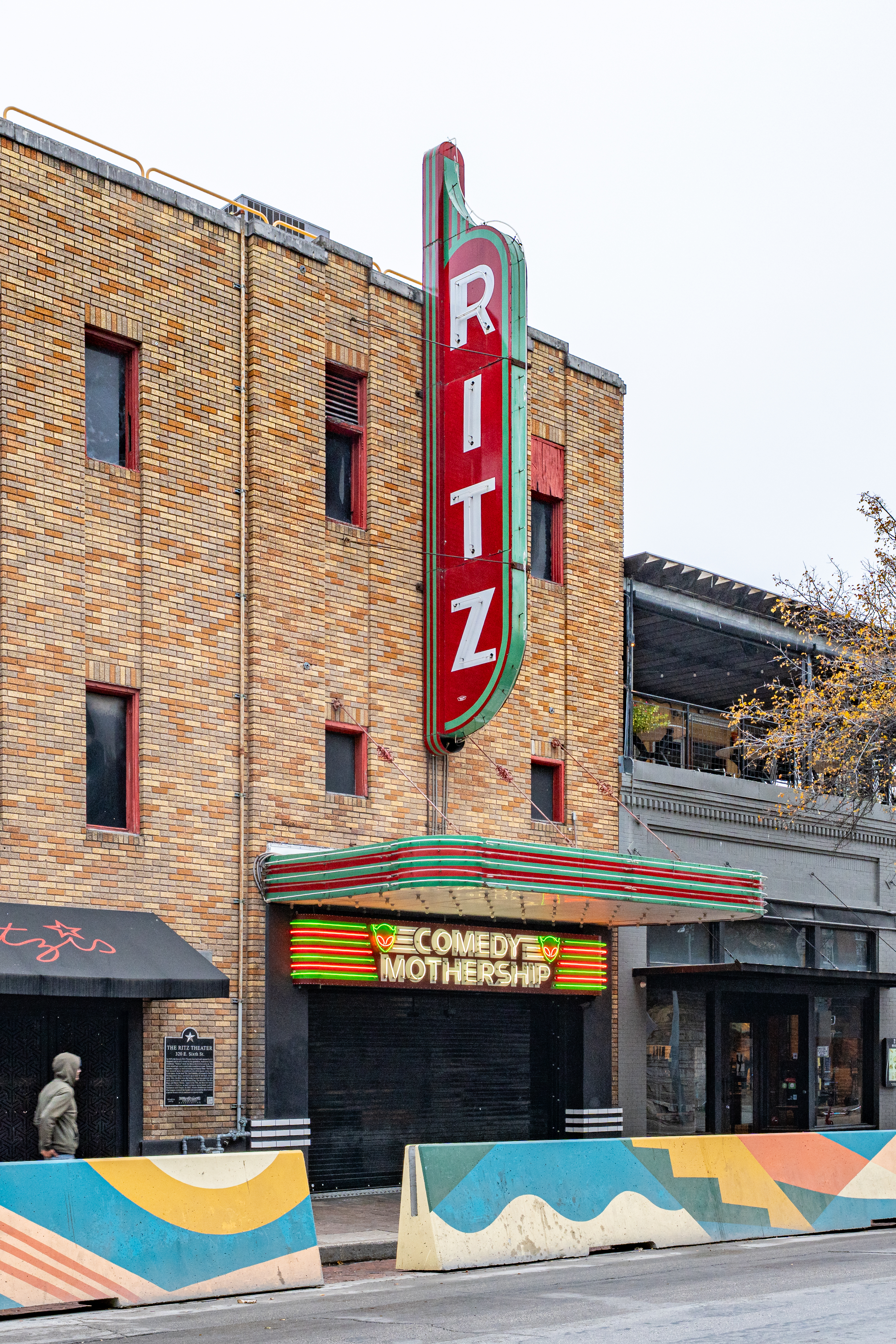
The Comedy Mothership at the former Ritz theater in Austin, Texas

In 2022, Rogan purchased the historic Ritz theater in downtown Austin, Texas, and renovated it into a comedy club known as the Comedy Mothership. The venue officially opened in March 2023 and features multiple performance rooms dedicated to stand-up comedy.

== Views ==
=== Political views ===
In 2011, Rogan endorsed Congressman Ron Paul and his presidential campaign during the Republican primaries, calling him "the only guy who is saying anything that makes any sense whatsoever." On America's Morning News, Rogan joked that electing Paul would be the ultimate stunt for presidential candidates. He had also expressed cynicism about politics, likening voting to professional wrestling—entertaining, but unlikely to change the outcome.

In January 2020, CNN described Rogan as "libertarian-leaning".

Between 2019 and 2020, Rogan described himself as socially liberal, saying he supports same-sex marriage, gay rights, women's rights, recreational drug use, universal health care, universal basic income, gun rights, and the Second Amendment. He describes himself as a strong supporter of freedom of speech, and has criticized cancel culture and what he perceives to be suppression of those who hold right-wing views in the television and film industry. He has also criticized what he describes as an American foreign policy of military adventurism.

While admitting that he has "zero understanding" of Canada's political system, Rogan opposed Canadian Prime Minister Justin Trudeau, calling him "a fucking dictator", and called Canada "communist" and "fucked". Rogan also said that he had approved of Trudeau prior to the COVID-19 pandemic.

In March 2024, Rogan described Israel's actions in the Gaza Strip as a "genocide".

Rogan described the way that President Vladimir Putin leads Russia as "evil" but "impressive". He called Putin a "strong leader" and asked, "Isn't there always a longing for a strong man?" In November 2024, Rogan said the 2022 Russian invasion of Ukraine was "100% wrong". He criticized outgoing U.S. president Joe Biden for allowing Ukraine to strike back at mainland Russia with US-supplied missiles. He also criticized Ukrainian president Volodymyr Zelenskyy, saying, "Fuck you, man. You fucking people are about to start world war three". Ukrainian world heavyweight boxing champion Wladimir Klitschko accused Rogan of "repeating Russian propaganda". Klitschko posted a video offering to debate Rogan on his podcast "like free men".

In 2020, Rogan had endorsed left-wing Democratic candidate Bernie Sanders, saying, "I believe in him, I like him, I like him a lot". In 2022, Rogan said Republican Ron DeSantis would be "a good president".

On a July 2025 podcast, Rogan urged up-and-coming Texas Democrat James Talarico to run for president, saying that "we need someone who is actually a good person".

==== Support and criticism of Donald Trump ====
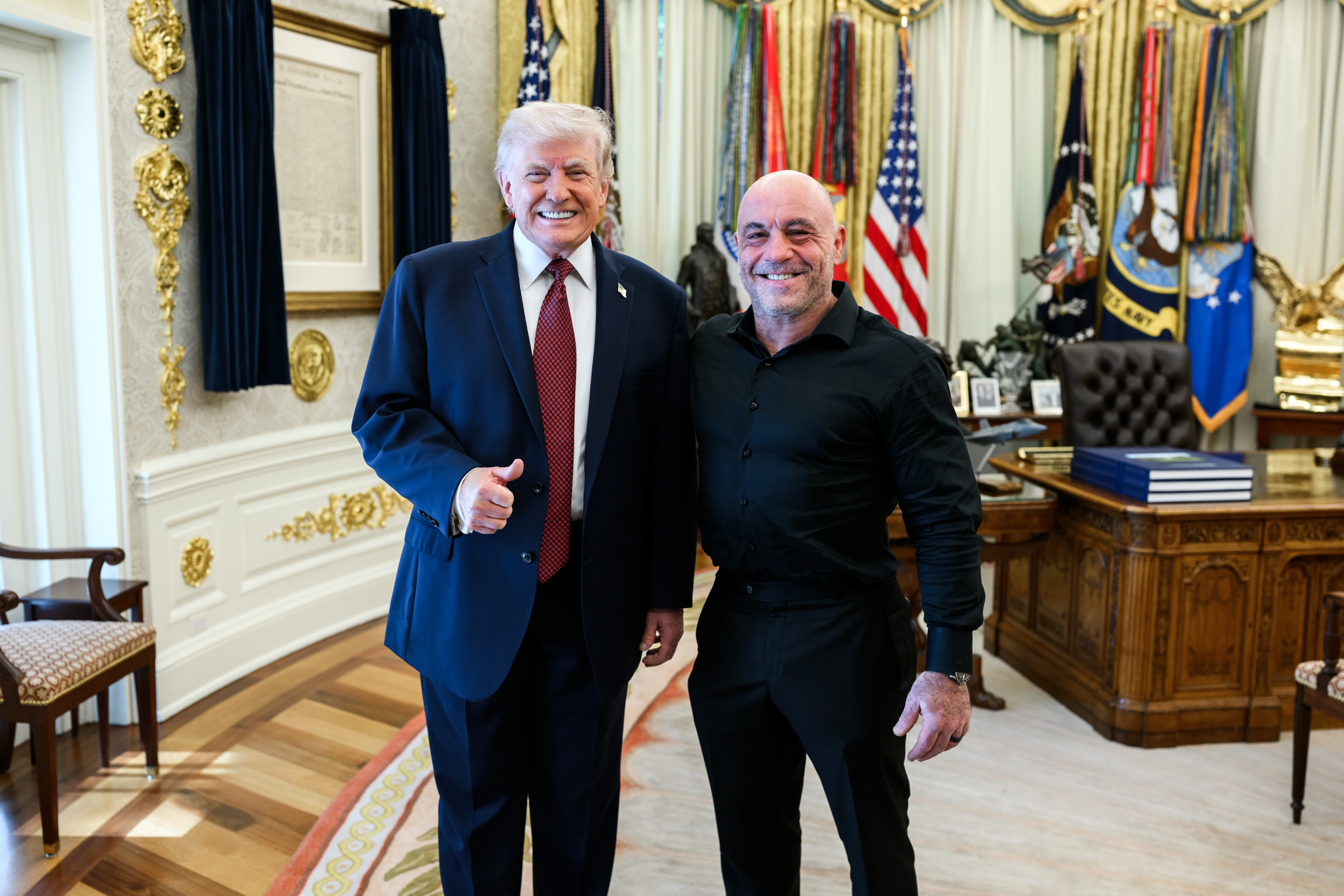
Rogan (right) with US President Donald Trump in April 2026

On November 4, 2024, the day before the 2024 United States presidential election, Rogan endorsed Republican candidate Donald Trump. Rogan said that Elon Musk, who had been a guest on his podcast a couple of days prior, "makes what I think is the most compelling case for Trump you'll hear, and I agree with him every step of the way". Rogan's last-minute endorsement was celebrated by Trump's campaign as a pivotal moment, leveraging his massive reach among young male voters—a demographic Trump actively targeted during the campaign. Rogan's podcast provided Trump a direct channel to bypass traditional media and connect with millions of listeners, amplifying the former president's populist messaging and mobilizing a key voter base. Rogan's pre-election support of Donald Trump was widely regarded as a decisive factor in securing Trump's win, especially among younger, male, and politically disengaged audiences.

After the election, Rogan criticized some of Trump's actions with which he disagreed. He said that Trump's feud with Canada was "stupid" in March 2025 and pointed out that during professional sporting events held between teams from both countries, Canadians "booed us over tariffs". By April 2025, a little over two months into the second Trump administration and its deportation operations, Rogan referred to the operation to deport immigrants to El Salvador as "horrific".

In July 2025, Rogan expressed his discontentment with the Trump administration's handling of the Epstein files, mentioning Jeffrey Epstein's name more than forty times in a podcast episode. Additionally, Rogan expressed concern with the Trump administration's deportation efforts, referring to the deportation of foreign students on college campuses. In the following month, Rogan said that Trump had no evidence to support the claim that there was widespread election fraud that caused Trump to lose the 2020 presidential election.

=== Psychedelics ===
Rogan supports the legalized use of cannabis and believes it holds numerous benefits. He hosted the documentary film The Union: The Business Behind Getting High and was featured in Marijuana: A Chronic History and The Culture High. He also supports the use of LSD, psilocybin mushrooms, and DMT toward the exploration and enhancement of consciousness, as well as introspection. He was the presenter in the 2010 documentary DMT: The Spirit Molecule. He has tasted psychoactive mad honey smuggled from Nepal in an episode of The Joe Rogan Experience along with guest Will Sonbuchner of Best Ever Food Review Show.

Rogan has an interest in sensory deprivation and using an isolation tank. He has stated that his personal experiences with meditation in isolation tanks have helped him explore the nature of consciousness and improve his performance in various physical and mental activities and overall well-being.

=== COVID-19 and vaccines ===
In April 2021, Rogan made contentious remarks about COVID-19 vaccines, in particular claiming that young, healthy people do not need to be vaccinated against the virus. This view was criticized by Anthony Fauci and White House communication director Kate Bedingfield, as well as by several media outlets. Part of the objection was that there have been notable cases affecting young, healthy people. Rogan acknowledged there was "some legitimate science" behind Fauci's view and emphasized that he is not a doctor and should not be taken as "a respected source of information".

On September 1, 2021, Rogan tested positive for the virus. Soon after, he released an online video reporting on the status of his condition and stating that he had begun a regimen including monoclonal antibodies, prednisone, azithromycin, NAD drip, a vitamin drip, as well as ivermectin, an antiparasitic drug that medical experts say is not an effective treatment for viruses such as COVID-19. This drew controversy due to multiple people reportedly being hospitalized after self-medicating with an over-the-counter form of ivermectin designed to treat parasitic infections in livestock, which typically has a significantly larger dosage. Rogan criticized CNN for describing ivermectin as a "horse dewormer". On Rogan's podcast, CNN Chief Medical Correspondent Sanjay Gupta said that ivermectin is used to treat parasitic infections, but that CNN should not have implied that Rogan was taking a veterinary drug since Rogan acquired it through a doctor. On September 3, 2021, Rogan was retested for the virus and the results were negative.

In January 2022, 270 scientists, physicians, professors, doctors, and healthcare workers wrote an open letter to Spotify expressing concern over "false and societally harmful assertions" on The Joe Rogan Experience and asked Spotify to "establish a clear and public policy to moderate misinformation on its platform". The 270 signatories took issue with Rogan "broadcasting misinformation, particularly regarding the COVID-19 pandemic" and more specifically "a highly controversial episode" featuring guest Robert W. Malone (#1757)", a biochemist who has promoted vaccine misinformation.

The episode was criticized for promoting conspiracy theories, including "an unfounded theory that societal leaders have 'hypnotized' the public". The signatories wrote that "Dr. Malone is one of two recent JRE guests who has compared pandemic policies to the Holocaust. These actions are not only objectionable and offensive, but also medically and culturally dangerous." The signatories also note that Malone was suspended from Twitter "for spreading misinformation about COVID-19".

On January 24, 2022, the songwriter Neil Young posted an open letter demanding that Spotify remove his music from their service if they would not remove The Joe Rogan Experience from their service. Young wrote that "Spotify has a responsibility to mitigate the spread of misinformation on its platform". On January 26, Spotify removed Young's music; a spokesperson said Spotify wanted "all the world's music and audio content to be available to Spotify users" and that it had a "great responsibility in balancing both safety for listeners and freedom for creators". On January 29, the songwriter Joni Mitchell removed her catalog from Spotify in support of Young and "the global scientific and medical communities on this issue".

Responding to the controversy, Rogan denied intentionally spreading misinformation and pledged "to try to balance out these more controversial viewpoints with other people's perspectives", and said that he agreed with Spotify adding a disclaimer to the beginning of his videos.

On January 10, 2025, Rogan published an interview with Facebook CEO Mark Zuckerberg, where Zuckerberg alleged that the Biden administration had pressured Facebook to take down posts claiming that the COVID-19 vaccine had side effects.

=== Other views, medical misinformation, and advocacy ===
Rogan is an avid hunter and is part of the "Eat What You Kill" movement, which attempts to move away from factory farming and the mistreatment of animals raised for food. His hunting experience predominantly consists of guided archery elk hunts on private land.

Rogan has expressed transphobic views, calling transgender people "fucking perverts", and spread disinformation, claiming transgender people are the majority of high school shooters, which is false. He has criticised transgender women competing in women's sports, including MMA matches. In April 2022, he said that transgender swimmer Lia Thomas "might be the woke straw that breaks society's camel's back". Rogan has offered a critique of transgender martial arts artist Fallon Fox, saying "If you had a dick at one point in time, you also have all the bone structure that comes with having a dick. You have bigger hands, you have bigger shoulder joints. You're a fucking man". In his 2024 Netflix Comedy special, Rogan said "I believe in trans people ... nature can throw you a curveball and you believe you’re in the wrong body. And I fully support your right as an adult to do whatever you want that makes you happy. I believe in freedom, and I believe in love. But I also believe in crazy people." He added "I just think we need standards. You can’t just put lipstick on and now you can shit in the women's room!"

In October 2022, while interviewing Tulsi Gabbard on his show, Rogan shared the widely discredited litter boxes in schools hoax, claiming that public schools were providing litter boxes to students who dress up as cats. Rogan said several weeks later that "it doesn't seem that there's any proof that they put a litter box in there", but falsely claimed that there were discussions considering the idea.

During an episode of his podcast in February 2023, Rogan stated the "idea that Jewish people are not into money is ridiculous. That's like saying Italians aren't into pizza. It's fucking stupid." Rogan made the comment in defense of Congresswoman Ilhan Omar, who faced allegations of antisemitism for saying that political support for Israel in the U.S. was motivated solely by money, and had tweeted "It's all about the Benjamins". Jonathan Greenblatt, the Director of the Anti-Defamation League, condemned Rogan's comment as reflecting "antisemitic tropes about Jews and money".

In a February 2024 podcast with Bret Weinstein, Rogan promoted the debunked claim that party drugs such as poppers were "a very important factor in AIDS", and falsely claimed that the antiviral drug AZT killed people "quicker" than AIDS itself. Rogan and Weinstein also praised AIDS denialist Peter Duesberg, saying that he had been "demonized" for his arguments about AZT. The American Foundation for AIDS Research reacted by saying, "The fact is that the human immunodeficiency virus (HIV), untreated, causes AIDS" and criticizing the podcast for "disseminating false information".

In April 2025, Rogan said that the re-emergence of the disability slur "retard" into the mainstream is "one of the greatest cultural victories that I think is spurred on, probably, by podcasts".

In September 2025, Rogan was criticized by Jessica Tierney, a paleoclimatologist at the University of Arizona, for his interpretation of a chart that she co-authored which shows a record of Earth’s global average temperature over the last 485 million years, since the beginning of the Paleozoic era. Based on Tierney's chart, Rogan claimed that the Earth is experiencing global cooling and that global temperatures are plummeting, despite decades of evidence of global warming. He called this an "inconvenient discovery" for the mainstream climate change narrative. Rollie Williams, of the YouTube show Climate Town, said of Rogan, "It’s almost impressive how incorrect he’s able to be about an article he’s looking directly at".

== Personal life ==
=== Family ===
Rogan married Jessica Ditzel, a former cocktail waitress, in 2009. They have two daughters, who were born in 2008 and 2010. Rogan is also the stepfather or adopted father of Ditzel's daughter from a previous relationship. In 2008, they moved to Gold Hill, Colorado, but returned to Southern California four months later when Ditzel became pregnant. They settled in Bell Canyon, California, where Rogan had lived on and off since 2003. In 2018, they purchased a new home in the area for almost $5 million. In 2020, the family moved into a $14 million home on Lake Austin in Austin, Texas.

In October 2019, he revealed that he is a second cousin of My Chemical Romance members Gerard Way and Mikey Way, although he has never met them.

=== Martial arts ===
Rogan became interested in jiu-jitsu after watching Royce Gracie fight at UFC 2: No Way Out in 1994. In 1996, he began training in Brazilian jiu-jitsu under Carlson Gracie at his school in Los Angeles, California. He is a black belt under Eddie Bravo's 10th Planet Jiu-Jitsu, a style of no-gi Brazilian jiu-jitsu, and a black belt in gi Brazilian jiu-jitsu under Jean Jacques Machado.

=== Religion ===
Rogan was raised Catholic and attended Catholic school for first grade. He later abandoned organized religion and called himself agnostic. However, when questioned by Zahi Hawass in 2025, he affirmed his belief in religion, having softened his previous stance in recent years. According to Christian apologist Wesley Huff, Rogan attends church every Sunday. Rogan has confirmed this and as of 2025 attends church services regularly.

=== Health ===
Rogan has vitiligo on his hands and feet.

=== Altercations ===
In June 2025, fitness influencer Liver King was arrested after making consecutive violent threats against Rogan on social media.

== Filmography ==
=== Films ===
Year	Title	Role	Notes
1997	Bruce Testones, Fashion Photographer	Bruce Testones	Short
2002	It's a Very Merry Muppet Christmas Movie	Himself	TV movie
2010	Venus & Vegas	Richie	
2011	Zookeeper	Gale	
2012	Here Comes the Boom	Himself	
2017	Bright	Himself	

=== Television ===
Year	Title	Role	Notes
1994	Hardball	Frank Valente	Main Cast
1995–1999	NewsRadio	Joe Garrelli	Main Cast
1996	MADtv	Himself/Host	Episode: "Episode #2.7"
2001	The Test	Himself/Panelist	Episode: "The Wedding Etiquette Test"
2001	Weakest Link	Himself	Episode: "Comedians Special"
2001–2002	Late Friday	Himself/Host	Main Host
2001–2012	Fear Factor	Himself/Host	Main Host: Season 1–7
2002	Win Ben Stein's Money	Himself	Episode: "April 26, 2002"
2002	Just Shoot Me!	Chris	Episode: "A Beautiful Mind"
2003	Good Morning, Miami	Himself	Episode: "Fear and Loathing in Miami"
2003–2004	The Man Show	Himself/Host	Main Host: Season 5–6
2003–2004	Chappelle's Show	Himself	Guest Cast: Season 1–2
2003–2007	Last Comic Standing	Himself/Celebrity Talent Scout	Celebrity Talent Scout: Season 1–5
2005	Las Vegas	Himself	Episode: "To Protect and Serve Manicotti"
2005	Beyond the Glory	Himself	Episode: "The Ultimate Fighting Championship"
2005–2008	The Ultimate Fighter	Himself/Announcer	Guest Announcer: Season 1–3 & 7
2007–2009	UFC Wired	Himself/Host	Main Host
2009	Game Show in My Head	Himself/Host	Main Host
2011	Garage Mahal	Himself	Episode: "Mixed Martial Arts Garage"
2011	Roadtrip Nation	Himself	Episode: "Episode #8.2"
2013	Joe Rogan Questions Everything	Himself/Host	Main Host
2015	Silicon Valley	Himself	Episode: "Homicide"
2020	The Comedy Store	Himself	

=== Comedy specials ===
Year	Title	Format	Publisher
2000	I'm Gonna Be Dead Someday ...	CD, cassette	Warner Bros. Records
2000	Voodoo Punanny	CD maxi-single, 12" promo	Warner Bros. Records
2001	Live From the Belly of the Beast	DVD	Sacred Cow Productions
2006	Joe Rogan: Live	Broadcast, DVD, streaming	Showtime/Image Entertainment/Netflix
2007	Shiny Happy Jihad	CD, download, streaming	Comedy Central Records
2010	Talking Monkeys in Space	Broadcast, CD, DVD, download, streaming	Spike TV/Comedy Central Records
2012	Live From the Tabernacle	Broadcast, download, streaming	Comedy Central/Talking Monkey
2014	Rocky Mountain High	Broadcast, download, streaming	Comedy Central/Comedy Central Records
2016	Triggered	Streaming	Netflix
2018	Strange Times	Streaming, vinyl	Netflix
2024	Burn the Boats	Broadcast, streaming	Netflix

=== Video games ===
Year	Title	Role
2009	UFC Undisputed 2009	Himself
2010	UFC Undisputed 2010	Himself
2014	EA Sports UFC	Himself
2016	EA Sports UFC 2	Himself
2018	EA Sports UFC 3	Himself

=== Documentaries ===
Year	Title
2007	The Union: The Business Behind Getting High
2007	American Drug War: The Last White Hope
2010	DMT: The Spirit Molecule

=== Publications ===
- Foreword to Endure: How to Work Hard, Outlast, and Keep Hammering, by Cameron Hanes, with an afterword by David Goggins. St. Martin's Press (2022). ISBN 978-1250279293.

== Awards and honors ==
- Teen Choice Award
  - Choice TV Reality/Variety Host for Fear Factor (2003, Nominated)
- World MMA Awards
  - 2011 MMA Personality of the Year
  - 2012 MMA Personality of the Year
  - 2014 MMA Personality of the Year
  - 2015 MMA Personality of the Year
  - 2016 MMA Personality of the Year
  - 2017 MMA Personality of the Year
  - 2019 – July 2020 MMA Personality of the Year
- Wrestling Observer Newsletter
  - Best Television Announcer (2010, 2011)

== See also ==
- List of Brazilian jiu-jitsu practitioners
- List of United States stand-up comedians
