= The Comedy Store =

Comedy club in California, United States

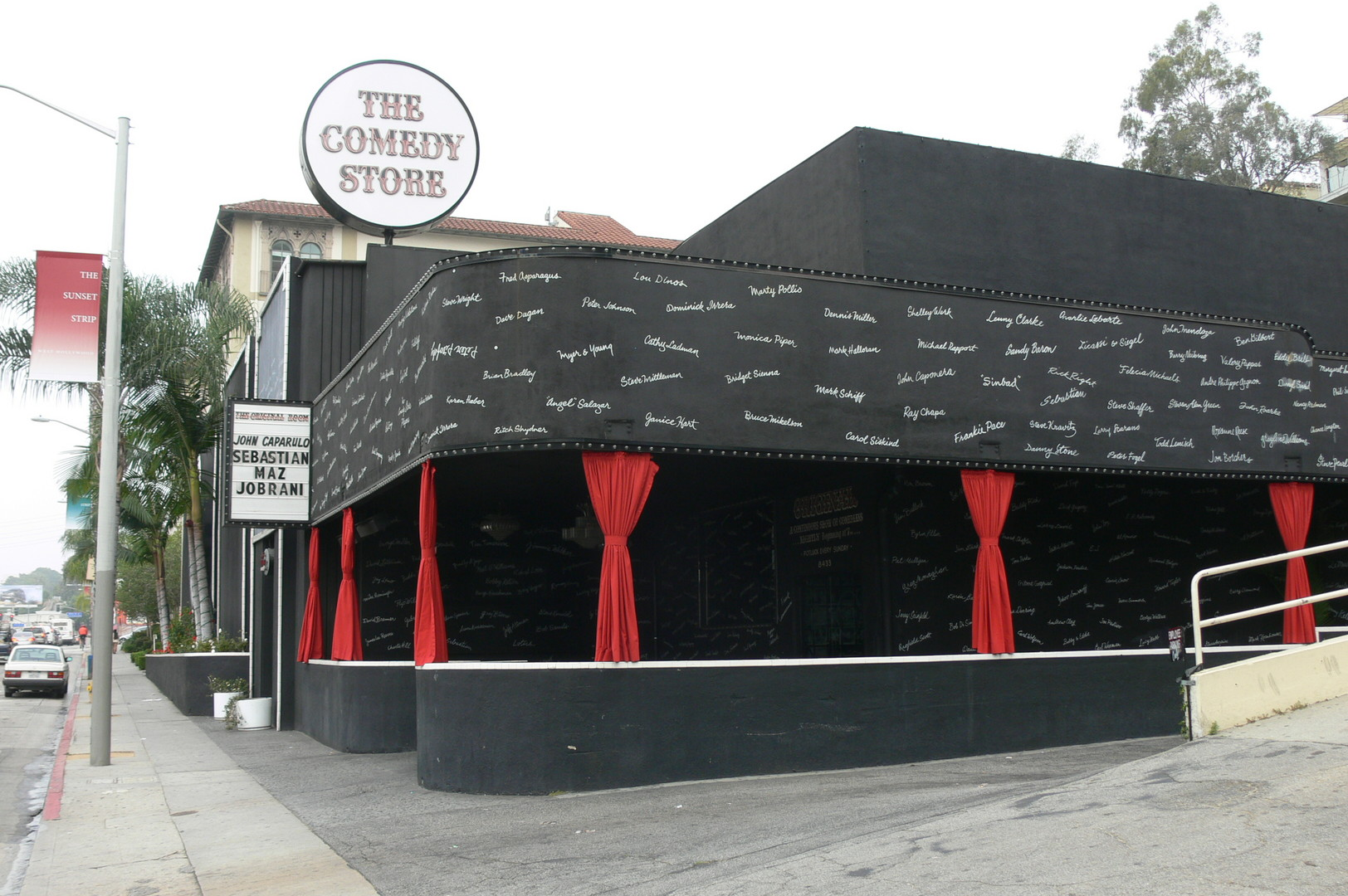
- The Comedy Store in 2006
- Interactive map of The Comedy Store
- Former names: Club Seville
- Address: 8433 West Sunset Boulevard
- Location: West Hollywood, California, U.S.
- Coordinates: 34.09510°N 118.37384°W
- Owner: Peter H. Shore, Trustee of the Mitzi S. Shore Trust
- Capacity: Main room: 450
- Type: Comedy club

Construction
- Opened: April 1972
- Renovated: 1976

Website
- thecomedystore.com

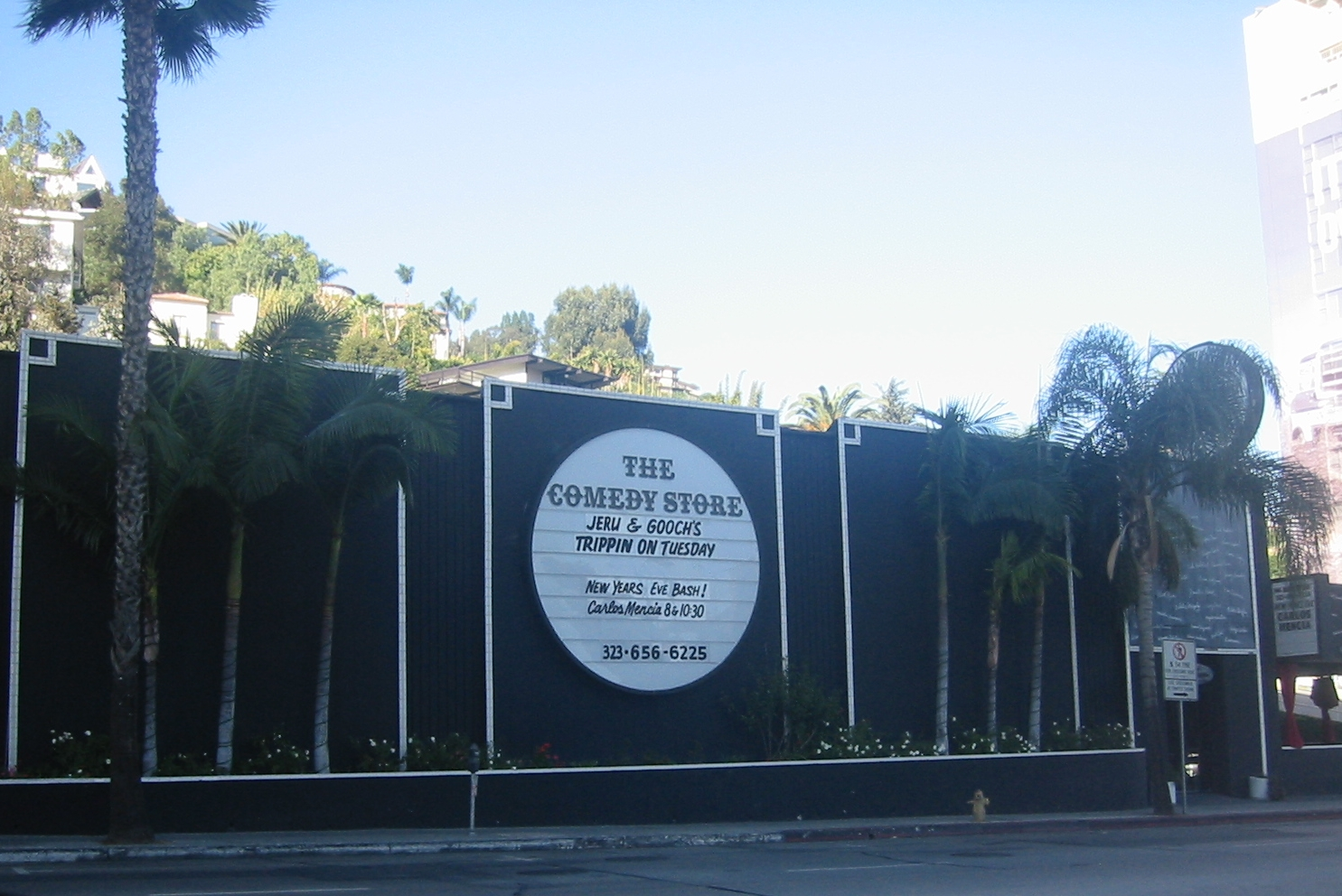
The Comedy Store

The Comedy Store is an American comedy club opened in April 1972. It is located in West Hollywood, California, at 8433 Sunset Boulevard on the Sunset Strip. An associated club is located in La Jolla, San Diego, California.

== History ==
The Comedy Store was opened in April 1972 by comedians Sammy Shore (1927–2019), and Rudy De Luca. The building was formerly the home of Club Seville (1935), later, Ciro's (1940–1957), a popular Hollywood nightclub owned by William Wilkerson, and later Ciro's Le Disc, a rock and roll venue, where the Byrds were discovered in 1964.

When the venue reopened as The Comedy Store in 1972, it included a 99-seat theatre. As a result of a divorce settlement, Sammy Shore's ex-wife Mitzi Shore began operating the club in 1973, and was able to buy the building in 1976. She immediately renovated and expanded the club to include a 450-seat main room, and was later aided in running the club by "Princess Cory" Comeaux-Soto, who married club comedian Freddy Soto.

In 1974, The Comedy Store hosted the wedding reception of newlyweds Liza Minnelli and Jack Haley, Jr. The Comedy Club signage was covered, for the evening, by signs reading "Ciro's", denoting the venue's prior identity. The event was attended by many dozens of Hollywood glitterati, including Elizabeth Taylor, Sammy Davis Jr., Cher, Bob Fosse, Johnny Carson, Goldie Hawn, Cesar Romero, Priscilla Presley and other stars, past and present.

== Locations ==
The original Comedy Store on Sunset at Ciro's had been joined by the Comedy Store Westwood, at 1621 Westwood Blvd., the Comedy Store La Jolla, at 916 Pearl St., Comedy Store Playhouse, on Las Palmas, Comedy Store at the Sheraton Universal Hotel, in Universal City, and the Comedy Store Las Vegas at the Dunes Hotel.

== Job action ==
Beginning in 1979, The Comedy Store served for many years as the host location for the annual HBO Young Comedians specials.

Tension between the club owners stems from a 1979 strike of Los Angeles comedians against the Comedy Store's "no-pay policy". Until that time, neither Shore nor Friedman paid comedians a salary. The theory was that comedians should almost be paying the owners for the exposure the clubs provided. When the comedians' strike began, The Improv (opened in 1974 at 8162 Melrose Avenue) was closed for fire-damage repairs. Therefore, the strike focused on Shore, not Friedman.

Also in 1979, stand-up comedians formed a short-lived labor union and demanded to be paid for their appearances at The Comedy Store. For six weeks (beginning in March), several comedians staged a protest in front of the club, while others crossed the picket line. The comedians involved formed a union called Comedians for Compensation and fought for pay where they had received none before. They eventually picketed in front of the club when their demands were not met. Jay Leno and David Letterman were among those on the picket line while Garry Shandling and Yakov Smirnoff crossed the line.

The job action was not legally a strike as the comedians were classified as "independent contractors" and were not under contract with the club.

Mitzi Shore argued that the club was and had always been a showcase and training ground for young comedians and was not about profits. She alleged that comedians came to the club and could work on their material in front of casting agents and other talent scouts who would possibly hire them as professionals if they were good enough.

The comedians at the club became unhappy when the club was expanded several times and it was perceived that Shore's profits were quite substantial. Shore also paid the rest of her staff, including waitresses and bartenders.

After the strike, some comedians were no longer allowed to perform at the club, including Steve Lubetkin, who committed suicide by jumping off the roof of the Continental Hyatt House next door. His suicide note included the line: "My name is Steve Lubetkin. I used to work at The Comedy Store." Lubetkin hoped that his suicide would resolve the labor dispute. He also cited Shore as the reason he no longer had a job.

The union ceased to exist in 1980, although from the time of the job action onward, comedians in Los Angeles were paid for their shows. This included The Comedy Store and The Improv.

== Cresthill house ==
"When she and Sammy divorced in 1974, he gave her the club to lower his alimony payments; two years later, after being briefly evicted (and opening a new Comedy Store location in Westwood), she negotiated a deal to buy the entire building — plus Cresthill...around the time of Lubetkin's suicide(After a bitter labor dispute between comedians and management), she essentially gave the place over to the comedians who worked at the Store."

Mitzi Shore also owned a 5,000-square-foot house a few doors away from the club, on 8420 Cresthill Road. The house was bought with the club in 1976. In 1979, she started to let the comedians from the clubs sleep there. During the 1980s, numerous comedians resided or just partied there, including Andrew Dice Clay, Marc Maron, Robin Williams, and Richard Pryor. Argus Hamilton and Mike Binder were the first to officially move into the house. Dave Coulier was also an early resident, and Yakov Smirnoff moved in during 1980. The place was known for its all-night parties and heavy consumption of cocaine and alcohol. Bill Hicks moved there in 1980 when he was 18 and running away from his parents to pursue his career as a comedian. Many of those comedians developed their style while residing there. Sam Kinison was a pillar there, and Jim Carrey turned his act around in this house. Mitzi Shore had a plan to cash in on the house's unique atmosphere, and even shot a 12-minute pilot around 1987 starring Daphne Davis, Nancy Redman, and Tamayo Otsuki. In 1988, because of the debauchery that had been going on for years, Mitzi Shore kicked everybody out of the house and turned it into a recovery house. By the early 1990s, Her son Pauly moved into the house, and by the end of the 1990s, the house was sold.

== Notable alumni ==
While many actors and comedians have performed at The Comedy Store, this list includes only notable alumni.

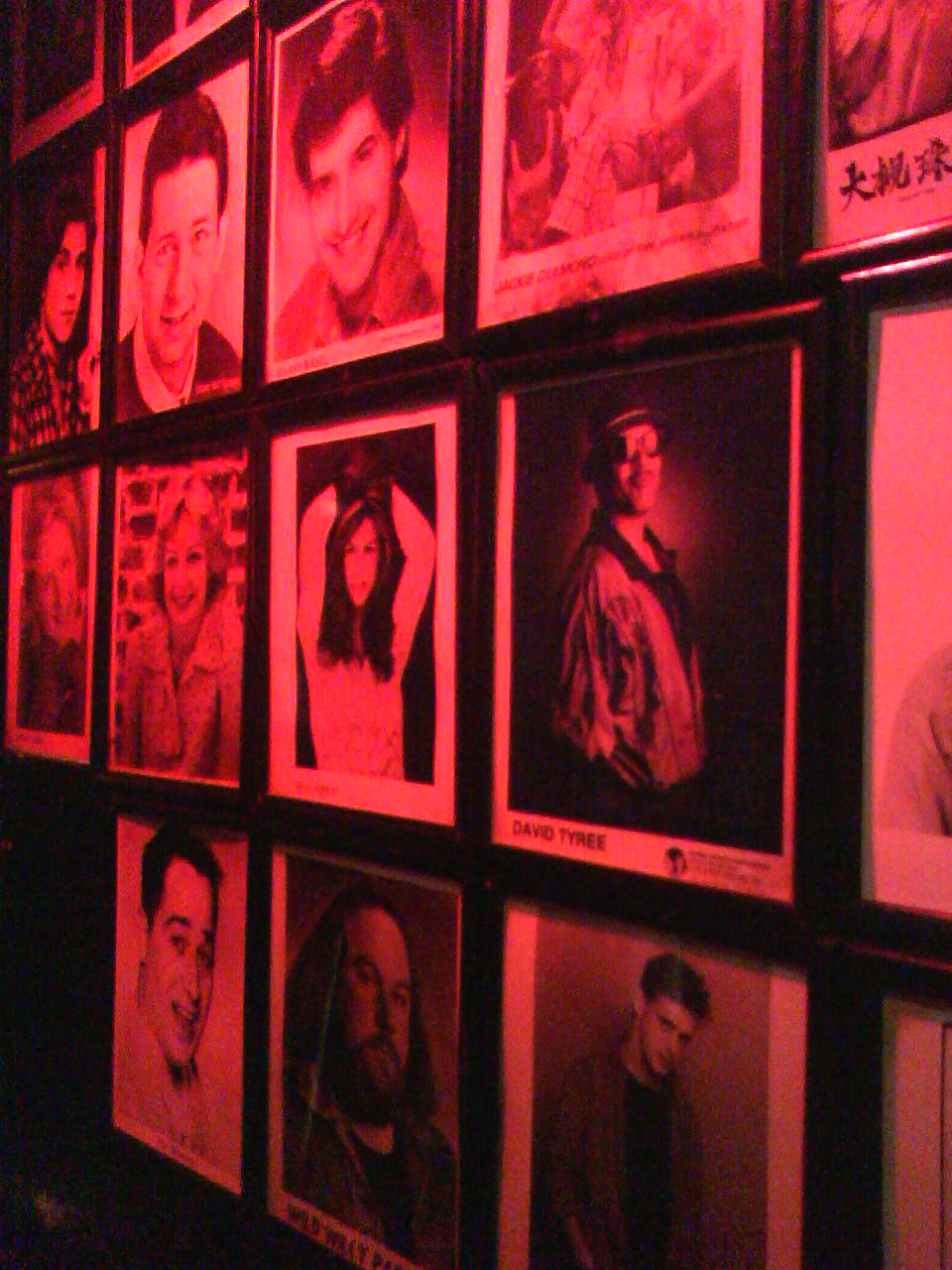
Signed photographs of past performers at The Comedy Store

- Tim Allen
- Louie Anderson
- Roseanne Barr
- Don Barris
- Sandra Bernhard
- Mike Binder
- Elayne Boosler
- David Brenner
- Bill Burr
- Bryan Callen
- John Caparulo
- George Carlin
- Jim Carrey
- Jimmy Carr
- Dana Carvey
- Dave Chappelle
- Chevy Chase
- Cheech & Chong
- Louis C.K.
- Andrew Dice Clay
- Jenn Colella
- Billy Crystal
- Whitney Cummings
- Rodney Dangerfield
- Chris D'Elia
- Joey Diaz
- Tom Dreesen
- Gallagher
- Jeff Garlin
- Whoopi Goldberg
- Gilbert Gottfried
- Kathy Griffin
- Argus Hamilton
- Chelsea Handler
- Kevin Hart
- Bill Hicks
- Charlie Hill
- Tony Hinchcliffe
- Joel Hodgson
- Andy Kaufman
- Michael Keaton
- Sam Kinison
- Bill Kirchenbauer
- Bert Kreischer
- Martin Lawrence
- Annie Lederman
- Bobby Lee
- Jay Leno
- David Letterman
- Jay London
- Norm Macdonald
- Kathleen Madigan
- Howie Mandel
- Sebastian Maniscalco
- Marc Maron
- Carlos Mencia
- Dennis Miller
- Paul Mooney
- Eddie Murphy
- Christina Pazsitzky
- Esther Povitsky
- Ollie Joe Prater
- Pat Proft
- Richard Pryor
- Chris Rock
- Paul Rodriguez
- Joe Rogan
- Ray Romano
- Chris Rush
- Bob Saget
- Andrew Santino
- Tom Segura
- Jerry Seinfeld
- Ari Shaffir
- Garry Shandling
- Iliza Shlesinger
- Pauly Shore
- Sarah Silverman
- Yakov Smirnoff
- Phil Snyder
- Freddy Soto
- David Spade
- Brody Stevens
- Marc Summers
- Duncan Trussell
- Theo Von
- Jimmie Walker
- Marsha Warfield
- Jeff Wayne
- Marc Weiner
- Robin Williams
- Thomas F. Wilson
- John Witherspoon
- David Zed

== Docu-series ==
A docu-series based on The Comedy Store debuted on Showtime in October 2020 called The Comedy Store.

Each episode is an hour long and breaks down a different time period throughout the existence of the Comedy Store. The director, Mike Binder goes on a podcast with a different comedian to set the tone and help provide the narrative of each episode.

=== Episodes ===
No.	Title	Directed by	Original release date	U.S. viewers (millions)
1	"Saw You Last Night on the Tonight Show"	Mike Binder	October 4, 2020	N/A
2	"The Comedy Strike"	Mike Binder	October 11, 2020	N/A
3	"The Wild Bunch"	Mike Binder	October 18, 2020	N/A
4	"Joe Rogan Returns"	Mike Binder	October 25, 2020	N/A
5	"The Birth of a Bit"	Mike Binder	November 1, 2020	N/A
