= List of comedy clubs in the United States =

This list of comedy clubs in the United States features notable venues for comedy performances including stand-up, improv and sketch theatres.

== Comedy clubs ==
Name	Location	State	Notes
ACME Comedy Theatre	Hollywood	California	
Annoyance Theatre	Chicago	Illinois	
Bananas Comedy Club	Poughkeepsie	New York	
Catch a Rising Star		New York	Additional locations in Princeton, New Jersey, Reno, Nevada, Las Vegas, Nevada, Lincoln, Rhode Island
Cobb's Comedy Club	San Francisco	California	
Coconuts Comedy Club	St. Petersburg	Florida	Includes 12 locations in Florida, 6 in other states
Comedy Cellar	Manhattan	New York	
The Comedy & Magic Club	Hermosa Beach	California	
The Comedy Store	West Hollywood	California	Sister location in San Diego, California
Comedy Works	Denver	Colorado	Also in Greenwood Village, Colorado
Comic Strip Live	Manhattan	New York	
Finest City Improv	San Diego	California	
The Funny Bone	Currently in 15 Locations	Albany, NY * Cincinnati, OH * Cleveland, OH * Columbus, OH * Dayton, OH * Des Moines, IA * HArtford, CT * Kansas City, MO * Omaha, NE * Orlando, FL * Richmond, VA * Syracuse, NY * Tampa, FL * Toledo, OH * Virginia Beach, VA	
The Groundlings	Los Angeles	California	
Governor's Comedy Club	Levittown	New York	Sister clubs Brokerage Comedy Club & Vaudeville Cafe in Bellmore, New York and McGuire's in Bohemia, New York
The Ice House (comedy club)	Pasadena	California	
ImprovBoston	Boston	Massachusetts	
Improv Asylum	Boston	Massachusetts	
The Improv	Brea, Hollywood, Irvine, Oxnard, San Jose, DC, Chicago, Milwaukee, Ontario, West Nyack, Raleigh, Pittsburgh, Denver, Addison, Arlington, Houston, Tempe, Fort Lauderdale, Palm Beach, Miami	CA, DC, IL, WI, CANADA, NY, NC, PA, CO, TX, AZ, FL	
Largo (nightclub)	Los Angeles	California	Music and stand-up comedy
Laugh Factory	Long Beach, Covina, Hollywood, San Diego, Chicago, Las Vegas, Reno	California, Nevada, Illinois	https://www.laughfactory.com
M.I.'s Westside Comedy Theater	Santa Monica	California	
Mic Drop Comedy	San Diego	California	
Monsters, Inc. Laugh Floor	Orlando	Florida	Interactive comedy club show attraction based on the 2001 Disney/Pixar animated film Monsters, Inc. was located in Tomorrowland at Magic Kingdom in Walt Disney World Resort in Orlando, Florida opened on April 2, 2007
Mark Ridley's Comedy Castle	Royal Oak	Michigan	
National Comedy Theatre			Locations in San Diego, Los Angeles, Phoenix, Manhattan
The Punchline	Sandy Springs	Georgia	
The Purple Onion	San Francisco	California	
The Second City	Chicago	Illinois	
Stand Up NY	Manhattan	New York	
The Stress Factory	New Brunswick	New Jersey	
Under the Gun Theater	Chicago	Illinois	
Zanies Comedy Club	Chicago	Illinois	Chicago & Rosemont, IL / Also Nashville, TN

== Defunct venues ==
- All Jokes Aside, Chicago
- Cabaret Concert Theatre, Los Angeles
- Comedy Workshop, Houston
- Dangerfield's, Manhattan
- Friars Club of Beverly Hills
- Holy City Zoo, San Francisco
- The Laff Stop, Houston
- San Francisco Comedy Condo

== See also ==
- Category:American comedy troupes
- Category:Comedy festivals in the United States
