= Dhaya Lakshminarayanan =

American comedian, performance artist, TV host, and storyteller

Dhaya Lakshminarayanan is an American comedian, performance artist, TV host, and storyteller. She has performed at venues such as San Francisco's Asian Art Museum, the San Jose Museum of Art, the Siren Theater, San Francisco's Punchline Comedy Club and Cobb's Comedy Club, the Brava Theatre, Throckmorton Theatre, and others. She has also performed at comedy festivals such as SF Sketchfest 2015 and SF Sketchfest 2020; the Desi Comedy Fest, America's only South Asian comedy festival; and the Out of Bounds Comedy Festival. In 2019, Lakshminarayanan, Will Durst, and W. Kamau Bell appeared as guests on KQED in regard to the controversial proposed closure of the historic San Francisco Punchline Comedy Club. The same year, she regularly opened for Greg Proops at the Punchline.

Lakshminarayanan has appeared on radio shows such as NPR's Snap Judgment, on which she has appeared seven times, and been featured on CBS's Bay Sunday with Tracy Humphrey. She is the former host of High School Quiz Show, a public television program created at Boston’s WGBH, which premiered in March 2010. In 2016, KQED named her one of their 20 Women to Watch. In 2019, SFist named her as one of their 13 San Francisco Standup Comedians to Go See Now.

== Early life ==
Lakshminarayanan was raised in a Hindu household in a suburb Cleveland, Ohio and later, Birmingham, Alabama. Growing up, she spoke Tamil, learning English through Sesame Street and other PBS shows. As children, she and her brother, Venkat, enjoyed Mad Libs and Choose Your Own Adventure books.

Lakshminarayanan's father, A.V., is one of 12 siblings, five of whom died in infancy. The remaining siblings survived smallpox, rheumatoid arthritis, and, in the case of A.V., being bitten by a scorpion, as well as contracting, though never developing, tuberculosis. He first emigrated from South India to the United States, in 1970 with $12; he had to spend time saving up in order to bring his wife, Hema—also from India—to the country. The couple settled in Illinois for a time, where they saw snow for the first time. In attempting to preserve their Indian cooking, they had to cobble together ingredients from diverse markets, finding eggplants at co-ops; cilantro, cumin, and plantains at Mexican groceries; and big bags of rice at Chinese markets.

Lakshminarayanan's father is a retired physics professor, while her mother is a working software engineer. Lakshminarayanan's brother holds a Ph.D. in neuroscience from Yale.

== Education ==
Lakshminarayanan holds two degrees from MIT, both a Bachelor's and a Master's in Urban Studies and City Planning, with her grad work focusing on Puerto Rico's energy economics and infrastructure finance; she authored the thesis Procurement of Backup Energy Supplies for Mass Transit: Tren Urbano, A Case Study during this time. Also during her tenure, she taught negotiation to second-year MBA students at MIT's Sloan School of Management. She was a member of the Zeta Mu chapter of the sorority Kappa Alpha Theta.

== Career ==
=== Business ===
Lakshminarayanan is a former investment manager of eBay founder Pierre Omidyar’s investment firm, the Omidyar Network, and worked in finance for years in different capacities, including as a venture capitalist. She also worked as a management consultant with Booz Allen Hamilton and worked in asset management for Parnassus Investments, a socially responsible mutual fund, where she specialized in health services. Additionally, she was Director of Strategy & Prizes at the Freedom Prize Foundation, an organization whose mission it is to decrease the United States' dependence on oil.

=== Comedy ===
Lakshminarayanan began working as a professional standup comedian in 2006. Her first set was an eight-minute routine on a bill alongside other comedians. One of her influences is Chris Rock.

Early in her career, she was selected for the national 5 Funny Females and Pundits with Punchlines comedy tours. In 2010, she was one of three headliners—and the only woman—of the Mahatma Moses Comedy Tour. The same year, she became host of High School Quiz Show, a public television program created at Boston’s WGBH; she occupied the post for the program's inaugural year. The show earned a New England Emmy.

In 2011, Lakshminarayanan created a humor-meets-how-to web series with the San Francisco non-profit One Economy, called Everyday Tech. Inspired by the humor and tech themes, Lakshminarayanan created Nerd Nation, a live comedy show about nerd culture, with showings at venues such as the Alameda Pacific Pinball Museum.

In 2013, one of Lakshminarayanan's highlight performances was Brava's New Year's Eve Comedy Fiesta, which she co-headlined with Marga Gomez and Micia Mosely.

In 2014, Lakshminarayanan and Karinda Dobbins created Stand Up Sit Down, a live comedy show and interview series, held at La Peña Cultural Center in Berkeley. Also in 2014, she performed a one-act play she wrote, in which she portrayed three characters, at the San Jose Museum of Art.

In 2017, Lakshminarayanan was selected as one of five comedians to perform and discuss comedy at San Francisco's Contemporary Jewish Museum in an evening called Please Don’t Tell Anyone You Saw Me: Comedians on The Edge. Meanwhile, her storytelling was featured at the Kearny Street Workshop, the oldest Asian Pacific American multidisciplinary arts organization in the United States. She also performed at the 16th Annual SF Sketchfest.

In 2019, she performed at shows in the Bay Area such as Tindervention: Stand Up Comedy & Tinder Horror Stories at Cobb's Comedy Club; the Funny Immigrants Comedy Show at Lost Church; Cocktails & Comedy at The Armory Club; Cheaper Than Therapy at the Shelton Theater; Stand-up Comedy at Salesforce Park with Danny Dechi & Friends, and numerous other shows. She also spent time in New York, performing at shows and events such as the Nasty Women Unite Festival and Isn’t She Funny: A Standup Comedy Show with a Dude-Free Lineup. In Massachusetts, she played Cityside Comedy, McGreevy's, Beacon Hill Pub, and the Wilbur Theater. Additionally, she performed at events such as Portland's All Jane Comedy Festival and the Cambridge Science Festival. Also in 2019, Lakshminarayanan performed live for the MUNI Diaries podcast at San Francisco's Exploratorium and the comedy benefit MAKE IT STOP: A Night to Raise Money and Some Hell for Gun Reform Candidates, with all proceeds going to One Vote at a Time, a group of female filmmakers who were making free professional campaign videos for candidates in state elections who were committed to gun reform. She also opened for Greg Proops at San Francisco's Punchline Comedy on a recurring basis.

In 2020, Lakshminarayanan is slated to appear in Cambridge, Massachusetts for Cerebella: An Evening of Nerdy Jokes and the Stories Behind the Jokes, SF Sketchfest, Irene Tu's Man Haters, Who’s Your Mami Comedy at the Brava Theater Center, and other shows and events.

Lakshminarayanan is the host of the monthly StorySLAM event, The Moth, at Public Works in San Francisco and is a regular featured performer at the historic San Francisco Punchline Comedy Club. (KQED interview, 6:22). She is also host, alongside Karinda Dobbins, of the political comedy show The Resistance at Oakland's New Parkway Theater.

== Awards and honors ==
- Liz Carpenter Political Humor Award (2016)
- Grand Prize Winner of Comedy Central Asia's Ultimate Comedy Challenge
- Best Comedian 2013, San Francisco Bay Guardian “Best of the Bay” Readers’ Poll
- Third Place Winner of the 2008 Harvey’s Political Competition
- First Place Winner of 2007 Battle of the Bay

== Personal life ==
Lakshminarayanan is a self-professed nerd and loves franchises like Star Wars and Star Trek. She also has a large Wonder Woman memorabilia collection. In 2016, she was living in Lower Pacific Heights, San Francisco.
