= Ken Jeong =

American comedian, actor, and physician (born 1969)

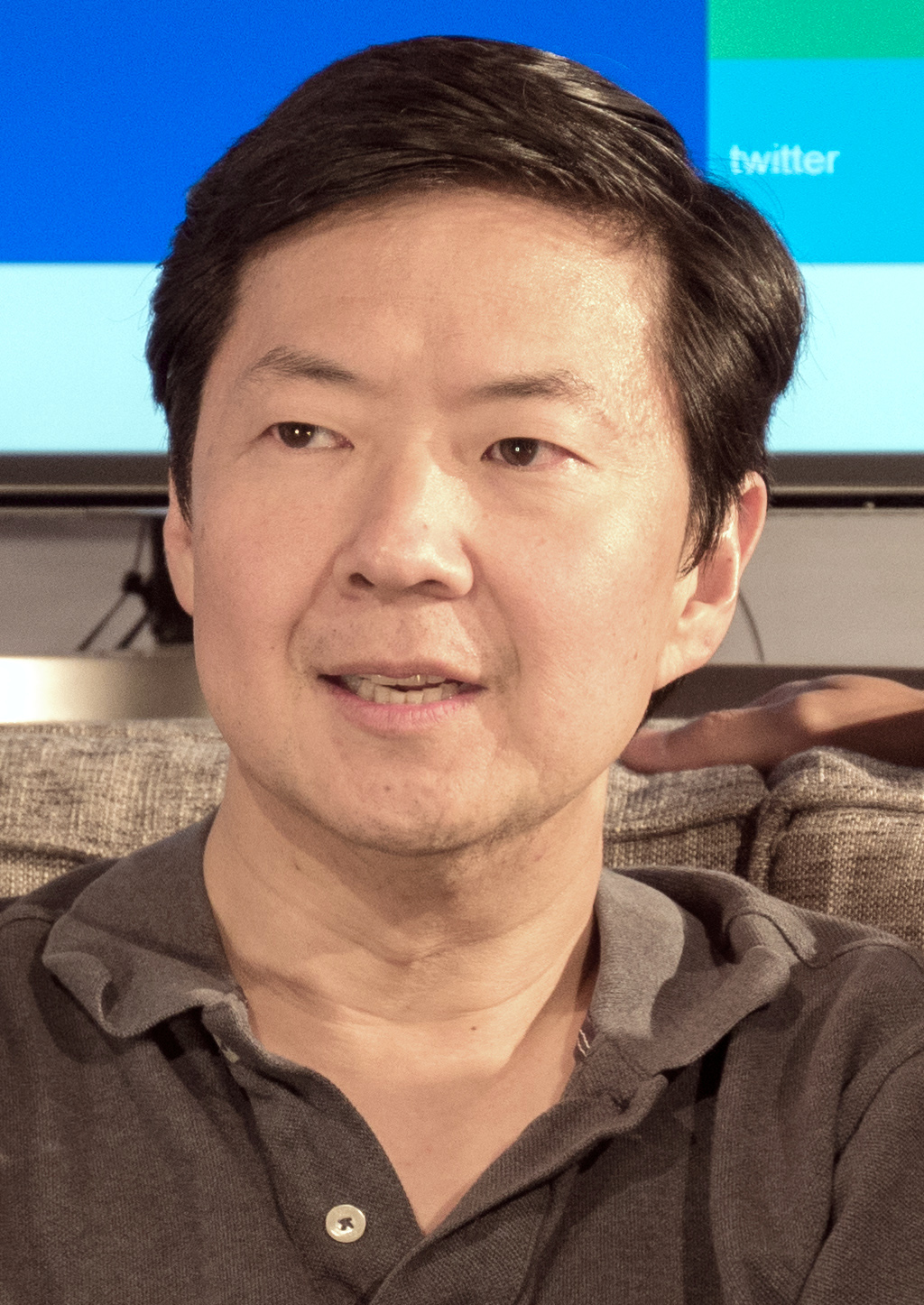
- Jeong in 2015
- Born: Kendrick Kang-Joh Jeong; July 13, 1969 (age 57); Detroit, Michigan, U.S.
- Education: Duke University (BS); University of North Carolina, Chapel Hill (MD)
- Occupations: Stand-up comedian; actor
- Spouse: Tran Ho (m. 2004)
- Children: 2

Comedy career
- Years active: 1995–present
- Medium: Stand-up; film; television
- Genres: Improvisational comedy; sketch comedy; observational comedy

Korean name
- Hangul: 정강조
- RR: Jeong Gangjo
- MR: Chŏng Kangjo
- Website: kenjeong.com

Kendrick Kang-Joh Jeong (/dʒʌŋ/; born July 13, 1969) is an American stand-up comedian, actor, and licensed physician. He played Leslie Chow in The Hangover film series (2009–2013) and Ben Chang in the NBC sitcom Community (2009–2015). He wrote and produced the ABC sitcom Dr. Ken (2015–2017), in which he portrays the titular character, and he has appeared in the films Knocked Up (2007), Role Models (2008), Furry Vengeance (2010), The Duff (2015), Ride Along 2 (2016), Crazy Rich Asians (2018), Scoob! (2020), Tom & Jerry (2021), and KPop Demon Hunters (2025).

Jeong is also a licensed physician in California but has stopped practicing in favor of his acting career. He appears as a panelist on the American version of the singing competition show The Masked Singer and appeared on the first series of the British version. He also serves as the host of I Can See Your Voice and 99 to Beat.

== Biography ==
Kendrick Kang-Joh Jeong was born on July 13, 1969, in Detroit, Michigan, to South Korean immigrant parents, D.K. and Young Jeong. He moved to North Carolina at the age of four, and was raised in Greensboro, North Carolina.

Jeong attended Walter Hines Page High School, where he participated in the regional quiz bowl, was elected to the student council, and played violin in the school orchestra. He graduated in 1986 at the age of 16, and later went on to receive Greensboro's Youth of the Year award for his achievements.

Jeong began pursuing acting while a sophomore at Duke University. He briefly considered majoring in drama while still continuing his pre-med coursework. He graduated from Duke in 1990 and obtained his M.D. at the UNC School of Medicine in 1995. The summer before medical school, he took theater classes at the University of California, Los Angeles (UCLA).

== Medical career ==
Jeong completed his residency at the Ochsner Medical Center in New Orleans. Jeong won the Big Easy Laff-Off in 1995 while still in residency. NBC president Brandon Tartikoff and The Improv founder Budd Friedman were judges and they both urged Jeong to move to Los Angeles.

Jeong moved to Los Angeles in 1998 and practiced medicine for several years as a physician of internal medicine at a Kaiser Permanente hospital in Woodland Hills.

== Comedy and acting career ==
He began performing regularly at The Improv and Laugh Factory comedy clubs. His stand-up work led to several television appearances, including NBC's The Office, FOX's MADtv, HBO's Entourage, and Curb Your Enthusiasm.

In 2002, Jeong landed a spot on Comedy Central's Comic Groove. Jeong was also on Kims of Comedy.

He made his film debut in Judd Apatow's Knocked Up as Dr. Kuni, which proved to be his breakout performance. From that point forward he was able to transition from medicine into a full-time career in the entertainment industry. Jeong gave up the practice in 2006 in favor of his acting career; however, he maintains his medical license and has assisted with medical emergencies during performances and on-set.

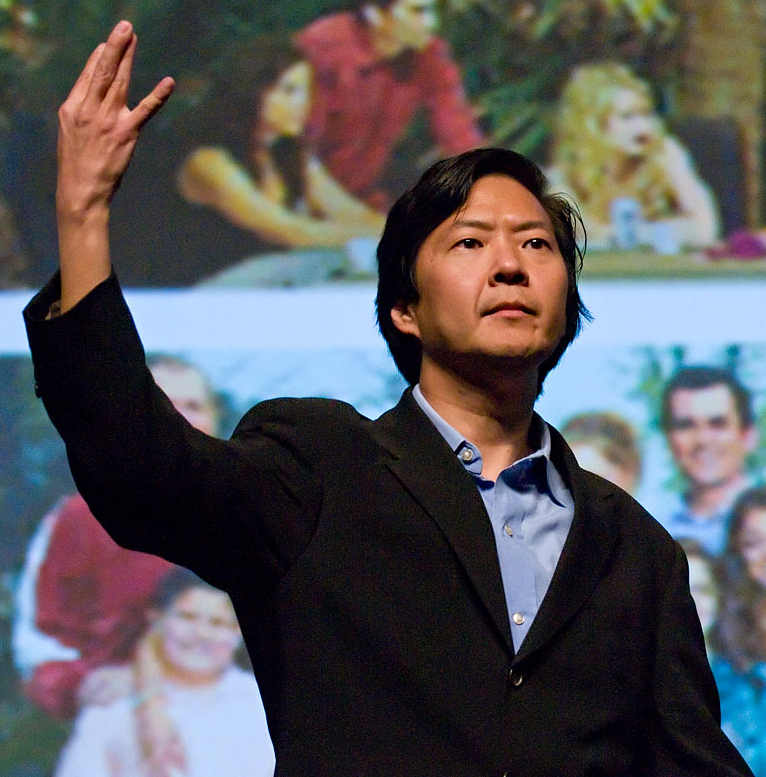
Jeong in 2011

Early in Jeong's career, he studied with director Natalia Lazarus at the Los Angeles Performing Arts Conservatory where she coached him for his film debut in Knocked Up. Lazarus coached Jeong from 2006 – 2012 for all of his film and television roles through The Hangover Part II. He appeared in Step Brothers; Pineapple Express; Role Models as King Argotron; All About Steve; The Goods: Live Hard, Sell Hard; Couples Retreat; and as Mr. Chow in The Hangover, The Hangover Part II, and The Hangover Part III. He co-starred in Zookeeper, Transformers: Dark of the Moon, and Crazy Rich Asians.

Jeong played Señor Chang on the NBC sitcom Community and was nominated for the show's "Male Breakout Star" at the 2010 Teen Choice Awards. He was nominated for two 2010 MTV Movie Awards, winning the award for Best WTF Moment and for MTV Movie Award for Best Villain for The Hangover. In fall 2010, Adidas basketball began a wide-ranging marketing campaign in which he starred as "Slim Chin", alongside NBA stars Dwight Howard and Derrick Rose. On May 22, 2011, he hosted the 2011 Billboard Music Awards in Las Vegas on ABC and was featured in a Hands Only CPR PSA campaign from the American Heart Association on June 15, 2011.

In 2012, Jamie Foxx and Jeong agreed to star in movies written and produced by the other. Foxx agreed to take a leading role in the Jeong's buddy comedy After Prom. Jeong, in turn, starred in Foxx's sports comedy All-Star Weekend. He also started as the voice of Dr. Yap in the animated comedy series Bob's Burgers.

In 2013, he appeared in Michael Bay's Pain & Gain (2013), as Johnny Wu, a motivational speaker. Later that year, he returned in a significantly expanded role as Mr. Chow in The Hangover Part III.

He voiced Kim Ly in the animated film Turbo (2013). In 2015, Jeong starred, wrote, and executive produced the pilot of his new ABC medical comedy, Dr. Ken, as a frustrated HMO doctor juggling his career, marriage, and parenting, but succeeding at none of them. On May 7, 2015, the series was ordered by ABC to debut in the 2015–16 TV season starring Jeong, Suzy Nakamura, Dave Foley, Tisha Campbell, and Jonathan Slavin. The series premiered on October 2, 2015.

In August 2018, Fox cast Jeong as a celebrity panelist on its music competition series The Masked Singer, based on the South Korean series King of Mask Singer. Additionally, Jeong appeared as a panelist on the first series of the British adaptation of the show. In January 2019, Jeong made a guest appearance on King of Mask Singer, performing "Creep" by Radiohead as the Golden Pig.

Jeong's first comedy special, You Complete Me, Ho, was released in 2019 on Netflix. The Epilepsy Foundation issued a statement regarding a joke in the performance that used an inaccurately referenced seizure first aid technique. In February 2020, Fox named Jeong as host and co-executive producer of its upcoming music game show I Can See Your Voice, also based on a South Korean format.

In March 2020, Jeong started a podcast with fellow Community actor Joel McHale, The Darkest Timeline with Ken Jeong & Joel McHale, as a response to the social isolation brought on by COVID-19 pandemic. They became the new hosts of Fox's New Year's Eve special New Year's Eve Toast & Roast 2021. The second edition was canceled due to the quickly-rising cases of Omicron variant in the COVID-19 pandemic. He also voiced Dynomutt in the Scooby-Doo animated film Scoob!.

In July 2021, Jeong appeared with Joel McHale as a guest judge on Crime Scene Kitchen. Also in 2021, Jeong provided the voice of Sprout Cloverleaf in the Netflix animated film My Little Pony: A New Generation.

In April 2022, Jeong walked off the show The Masked Singer after Rudy Giuliani was revealed as the latest singer on the show. Jeong was seen saying "I'm done," before walking off the show.

In October 2023, it was announced that Jeong would host a syndicated talk show developed by Debmar-Mercury. Jeong and Jim Biederman will serve as the show's executive producers and it was originally set to premiere in 2024. He was given a star on the Hollywood Walk of Fame that same year.

In April 2025, it was confirmed that Jeong would star in a Fox comedy project.

In June 2025, Jeong voiced the character Bobby in the successful Sony animated movie, KPop Demon Hunters.

Jeong became the host of 99 to Beat in 2025.

== Awards and recognition ==
Jeong won a Streamy Award for "Best Guest Appearance" for Burning Love.

Jeong was awarded the Visionary Award by East West Players, the oldest Asian Pacific American theatre company in the United States, for helping to raise "the visibility of the Asian Pacific American (APA) community through [his] craft."

In June 2026, at the Banff World Media Festival's Rockie Awards, Jeong's was awarded the Sir Peter Ustinov Comedy Award.

== Personal life ==
Jeong's wife Tran Ho is Vietnamese-American and a family physician. They have twin daughters (b. 2007). Jeong and his family reside in Calabasas, California. Jeong is a lifelong fan of the Los Angeles Dodgers, and he regularly appears at Dodger Stadium as both a fan and honorary member of their in-park host crew.
