= Comedy Club =

Comedy Club may refer to:

- Comedy club, a venue where people watch or listen to comedic performances
- The Comedy Club, a historically important jazz venue in Baltimore, Maryland, U.S., run by Ike Dixon
- Comedy Club (TV program), a Russian stand-up comedy TV show

== See also ==
- List of comedy clubs in the United States
- Category:Comedy venues
