= Karinda Dobbins =

American comedian

- Occupation: Comedian

Karinda Dobbins is an American comedian. She co-produces the monthly comedy show The Resistance! alongside Dhaya Lakshminarayanan, has regularly opened for W. Kamau Bell, and additionally opened for Trevor Noah, Gina Yashere, Michelle Wolf, and Dave Chappelle. She has performed at festivals such as the Desi Comedy Fest, the Portland Queer Comedy Festival, Bridgetown Comedy Festival, and Comedy Central's Colossal Clusterfest. In 2019, SFist named her one of their 13 San Francisco Standup Comedians to Go See Now.

== Early life ==
Dobbins was raised in Detroit. Her nickname was "Cool Breeze" due to her even temperament. Her family was politically engaged, which would later inform her brand of comedy. While "still playing straight," (XRAY.fm podcast, 6:36) Dobbins became pregnant and had a daughter, who was born in 1993. Before moving to California, Dobbins knew she wanted to come out as a lesbian to her mother, which she did. She came out to the rest of her family in Detroit the following Thanksgiving. (XRAY.fm podcast, 7:07)

== Career ==
Dobbins began her career in the bio-tech industry. In 2009, Dobbins performed—on a dare from her girlfriend—for the first time at an open mic night at Woody's, a laundromat café in Oakland, California. Incidentally, she was the only person who signed up. She proceeded to perform a seven-minute set. (XRAY.fm podcast, 5:15)

In 2011, she performed at San Francisco Woman Against Rape's She Who Laughs Lasts. In 2013, she opened for acts such as W. Kamau Bell and performed at venues such as the Great American Music Hall. In 2015, she headlined Gay for Days, Oakland's only queer comedy show and was featured on Put Your Hands Together, River Butcher and Cameron Esposito's live podcast. In 2016, she performed at the 20th Annual Michigan LGBTQ ComedyFest. In 2017, she appeared at Amado's for The Setup: Stand up Comedy in the Mission. In 2018, she was named as a judge for Literary Death Match, a competition of Litquake. She also performed as a special guest for the Oakland LGBT Center and Pride Film Fest's QTPOComedy Takeover fundraiser and the Novvato Theater Company's Third Annual Comedy Festival. Additionally, she played shows such as Woman Crush Wednesday at the Hollywood Improv,

In 2019, she performed at SF Sketchfest, headlined Brava Theater Center's Who’s Your Mami Comedy, headlined the show Comedy with Liz Grant and Friends, and performed at Minority Retort Presents, Freight & Salvage's Pride Comedy Night, Real Pain Fine Arts in Los Angeles, and in San Francisco Women Against Rape's 14th Annual Walk Against Rape. She also performed at MAKE IT STOP: A Night to Raise Money and Some Hell for Gun Reform Candidates, with all proceeds going to One Vote at a Time, a group of female filmmakers who were making free professional campaign videos for candidates in state elections who were committed to gun reform.

In 2024, Dobbins released her debut comedy album, Black and Blue.

== Influences ==
Dobbins has been compared to Dave Chappelle and Paul Mooney. One of her personal comedy icons is Moms Mabley.

== Awards and honors ==
- Named as one of 13 San Francisco Standup Comedians to Go See Now by SFist (2019)
- Named one of Bitch Media's Six Hilarious Female Comedians You Don't Know Yet—But Should (2014)

== Podcasts ==
Date	Show	Episode
2013	We Want the Airwaves	"Cool Breeze: An Interview with Karinda Dobbins"
2017	Politically Re-Active LIVE!	"Comedy in the Trump Era"
2017	Live Wire with Luke Burbank	Episode 348: "Tell It Like It Is with Loudon Wainwright III, Bruce Campbell, and Karinda Dobbins"
2017	Midlife Mixtape	Episode 3
2017	Sights & Sounds on KALW	
2018	The Spice Cabinet	"Seafood Boil with Karinda Dobbins"
2018	Quiz-o-Tron	"Quizlet! Karinda Dobbins on Who Even Needs Plasma Anyway"
2018	Sup Doc	"The United States of Detroit with director Tylor Norwood and comedian Karinda Dobbins"
2019	XRAY.fm	"Minority Retort with comedian Karinda Dobbins"
