= Al Comedy Club =

Comedy club in Jeddah, Saudi Arabia

Al Comedy Club is the first comedy club in Saudi Arabia established in 2012 in Jeddah, Saudi Arabia. It was first given the name “Jeddah Comedy Club”. It is registered as an official platform for Saudi comedians. It was established and currently managed by the Saudi comedian, Yaser Bakr. The club is supported by the Saudi General Entertainment Authority.
