= Jeffrey Jay =

American comedian

- Born: 1988 (age 37–38); Texas
- Occupations: Comedian, writer, and public speaker

Jeffrey Jay (born 1988) is an American comedian, writer, and public speaker. In 2011, The Advocate placed him on their list 7 Funny LGBT Comics You Shouldn’t Have Missed. In 2013, he was a finalist for Funniest Comedian in Texas; the same year, The Advocate named him one of the 5 Hottest Transgender Comedians. In television, Jay has appeared on the CW's The Eye Opener. Jay has spoken and performer at universities around the country, including Ramapo College of New Jersey; the University of New Haven in Connecticut; Hilbert College in Hamburg, New York; Wilson College in Chambersburg, Pennsylvania; Lake Superior State University in Sault Ste. Marie, Michigan; Wayne State University in Detroit, Michigan; Longwood University in Farmville, Virginia, Eastern Illinois University, and the University of Delaware.

== Early life ==
Jay was raised in Texas. He came out as a lesbian at age 14. Using a fake ID, he began going to a gay club in Houston. By age 20, Jay knew that something was unresolved in regard to his gender identity. Upon seeing a TV program featuring a trans man, he had his realization and knew he needed to transition. His parents were supportive, and Jay found a clinic in New York that was willing to expedite the then-two-year waiting period for hormones. Jay began his testosterone at age 21. He shortly thereafter dropped out of college and moved back to Texas where he sold knives in malls.

== Career ==
Jay has performed at comedy events such as the Dallas Comedy Festival, Portland Queer Comedy Festival, Bridgetown Comedy Festival, and Los Angeles Pride. He tours regularly and has played venues across the United States including Westside Comedy Theater in Santa Monica, California; the Funny Farm Comedy Club in Youngstown, Ohio; Ice House Comedy Club in Pasadena, California; and Ray Combs Florida Comedy Club. He also tours universities across the U.S. In 2020, Jay performed as part of the LGBTQ+ showcase Gays R Us at the Hollywood Improv; he shared the bill with Ali Liebegott, Jess Salomon, Kristin Key, Mike Rose, Lisa Bonnema, and others.

In April 2022, Jay was a cast member on the Audio Reality Podcast Being TRANS by Lemonada Media which received acclaim by the New York Times and Vulture.
