= Traffic School by Improv =

1989 establishments in California

IMPROVLearning aka Defensive Driving by IMPROV
- Product type: [[Fleet Safety Training][Traffic school]], defensive driving, driver's education, insurance discount programs
- Current owner: Interactive Education Concepts (1989)
- Country: United States
- Introduced: 1989
- Related brands: The Improv
- Markets: United States
- Tagline: Rethink the ordinary... love learning again!
- Website: myimprov.com website = improvlearning.com website = driverz.com

IMPROVLearning is an American company that provides behavior-based driver education, traffic school, defensive driving programs, and workplace safety courses. The company employs the educational entertainment "edutainment" approach to teaching, which combines education with entertainment. The company claims that some of their courses "have shown a statistical improvement in reducing crashes and moving violations."

== Company ==
IMPROVLearning was recognized on Inc. magazine's list of fastest-growing private companies in America from 2012 until 2016. It was identified by the Los Angeles Business Journal as one of the top 100 fastest-growing private companies in 2015. Traffic School by Improv's headquarters is in Woodland Hills, California. As of 14 September 2016, the company has a 4.7-star (out of 5) overall-satisfaction rating on ShopperApproved.com.

IMPROV Learning is one of several companies owned by Interactive Education Concepts, Inc. Established in 1994, Interactive Education Concepts also operates courses for drivers of all experience levels. Corporate fleet training and driving school partnerships exists under IMPROVLearning. Adult driver education, insurance discount, and court referred traffic citation courses exist under myIMPROV. Teen driver education and parent driver education resources can be found through DriverZ.

=== History ===
IMPROV Learing was founded in 1980 by a Ukrainian-born entrepreneur, Gary Alexander, and the owner of the Hollywood Improv Comedy Club, Budd Friedman as Improv the Comedy Club Presents Traffic School. Early classes were held at the comedy club itself, on Melrose Avenue in Los Angeles. Free passes to comedy shows at the club were given to students.

== Courses ==
=== Traffic school and defensive driving ===
IMPROVLearning is approved by various state jurisdictions to administer defensive driving courses. The courses, which may allow traffic offenders to have tickets waived, fines reduced, or penalty points eliminated, are intended both to entertain and to educate. In some states, auto insurance rates may also decrease. They offer Family Feud-style games for students, and graduation parties for students who successfully complete the course.

The company is one of several comedy traffic schools in California. The New Yorker magazine has attributed their success in California to "environmental factors: an exceedingly car-rich urban sprawl and one of the world's largest populations of out-of-work actors." Comedy traffic schools help actors working outside of show business make ends meet. According to Alexander, the company "use[s] humor to deliver a very important message."

=== OSHA-compliance and workplace training ===
In 2014, Improv added a new website, www.ImprovSafety.com that offers safety training for employers. The courses, which are constructed with the same Improv principles used in their driver education courses, include the Occupational Safety and Health Administration (OSHA) compliant Don't be a Derk, starring Pamela Anderson and Kato Kaelin.

=== Drivers education and insurance discount courses ===
While most customers who take a class are not novice drivers, the company also offers drivers education and insurance reduction courses.
