= Belinda Carroll (comedian) =

American standup comedian, writer, activist, actress, and singer

- Occupations: Standup comedian, writer, activist, actress, and singer
- Known for: Founder of the Portland Queer Comedy Festival, organizer of the Portland Dyke March

Belinda Carroll is an American standup comedian, writer, activist, actress, and singer. She is the founder of the Portland Queer Comedy Festival, organizer of the Portland Dyke March, and is a co-organizer as well as date auction host and fundraiser emcee of the Butch Voices Portland Regional Conference.

At age 22, Carroll held a Miss Leather title. She performs annually at Portland Pride and in 2013, was named a finalist in the Advocate's Stand Out: The National Queer Comedy Search.

In 2016, Carroll began working as a tour guide for Know Your City's "Pride Forever: LGBTQ History Tour." She performs annually at Portland's Slut Walk. In 2018, she was designated a Queer Hero as part of Queer Heroes Northwest. The same year, she was chosen as the sole representative for queer Oregon as featured in USA Today's Faces of Pride article. In 2019, the theatre and advocacy group, CoHo Productions, listed Carroll as one of their Iconic Women as part of their This Woman portrait and interview series.

In television, Carroll has appeared on shows such as Portlandia and in bit spots like an Oregon Lottery Winter Scratch-It's commercial. She has written for print media outlets such as the Portland Mercury, Huffington Post, PQ Monthly, and Cracked.com.

Belinda was awarded the Woman of Achievement Award from the State of Oregon. The award was presented to her by Governor Kate Brown on March 10, 2020.

== Early life ==
Carroll is the granddaughter of coal miners from West Virginia.

Carroll's mother was raised on a farm without electricity in Turkey Creek, West Virginia, and left school after the sixth grade. She had her first son in 1956 at the age of 20, then moved west in 1963, working in laundry services and as a line cook. During this period, she married and had a second son. Following a divorce in the early 1970s, she was left in debt as a single mother. In 1976, at the age of 40, she gave birth to Carroll Portland, Oregon.

Carroll was raised in Portland in what she describes as a "really God-centered, Jesus-centered environment" in a Southern Missionary Baptist household, which she says always had the Trinity Broadcasting Network playing. She describes the region as "very, very conservative" and "all loggers...all industry" at the time as well as in a neighborhood "full of KKK people like skinheads, and, you know, Neo-Nazis."

Carroll experienced "relentless" bullying as a youth. Her early queer influences were limited to The Original Coming Out Stories (Crossing Press, 1989), and "sneaking in the occasional gay-themed Donahue." She came out as a lesbian at age 15, declaring herself a lesbian feminist activist at age 16 or 17. Her Republican brothers and the rest of her family members were taken aback, accusing her of doing it to "be contrarian" and "trying to be political for a while." Carroll's mother, a Southern Missionary Baptist Christian, albeit a Southern Democrat, was "shocked," believing that Carroll was "too feminine to be a lesbian". She then rejected her, which prompted Carroll to move out of the house. She was homeless for a year and a half, couch surfing and living on the streets, even attempting suicide.

When she returned to her mother after that period, her mother was "apologetic" and Carroll "watched her go from this really rigid, evangelical Christian with these very firm beliefs in what was sin and what wasn't sin" to someone who was able to develop non-judgmental, empathetic camaraderie with Carroll and Carroll's gay friends, saying to Carroll, in effect, when Carroll was 25, "'You know what? I'm glad you're gay. You've never let anyone define who you are, you've always been your own person.'"

== Career ==
=== Singing and drag ===
Carroll began singing at an early age, performing with a number of bands since she was 16 in the genres of R'n'B and soul. In Austin, Texas, she was part of a jazz-funk trio. In her early 20s, she began performing in drag acts.

=== Activism ===
Carroll came out as a lesbian feminist activist at age 15. Within a year, in 1992, she began campaigning to oppose Measure 9, a proposed amendment to the Oregon Constitution that declared homosexuality to be "abnormal, wrong, unnatural, and perverse," allowed open discrimination, and required the state "to actively discourage homosexuality, teaching that it is a moral offense similar to pedophilia, sadism and masochism." Contemporaneously, Carroll began attending Lesbian Avengers meetings with her girlfriend which proved an education for participating in direct-action advocacy.

In 2011, Pride NW honored Carroll with their Pride-in-Action Award for Carroll's grassroots work founding Q Patrol, a community foot patrol intended to reduce hate crimes against LGBTQ+ people in Downtown Portland.

In 2013, she performed as part of Portland: Naughty-Listed—Stories of Holiday Misbehavior, a storytelling series benefiting the Democratic Party of Oregon.

In 2015, one of Carroll's activist pursuits involved a conversation with a gay Ugandan comedy fan who befriended her on Facebook. With his permission, Carroll documented their dialogue and published it in PQ Monthly to spread awareness about the persecution and violence queer Ugandans face.

In 2017, Carroll performed as part of a nationwide comedy benefit for the American Civil Liberties Union (ACLU), a counter-response to the promises of human rights violations on which Donald Trump ran his presidential campaign. Dozens of comedians performed across 20 states. The Portland iteration, called What A Joke, featured Carroll and just three other comedians as representatives of their city.

Carroll has performed at various annual gay pride events, including Portland Pride 2019's Big Gay Afterparty, and Beaverton's Pride Festival 2019. She has also performed at the Sex-Positive Education & Events Center for Portland's iteration of the international anti-slut-shaming march, SlutWalk.

=== Comedy ===
Carroll began performing as a professional standup comedian at age 32, after Sarah Palin was nominated for Vice President of the United States. Disturbed by the event, Carroll processed her feelings with joke-writing, subsequently delivering them at an open mic at Cap City Comedy in Austin, Texas. She was only two weeks sober. It so happened that the show was recorded and ended up online, where a comedian friend saw her set. They encouraged her to keep at the craft, and she did, ending up with a sold-out performance for her first gay audience in 2009. This led her to start producing her own shows by and for the queer community, though not exclusionary of non-queer subject matter and audience members.

Since her debut, Carroll has organized and participated in numerous performances. She has participated in the All-Jane Comedy Festival, SMUT: Comedy Done Dirty, the Outlandish! series, OUT/LOUD's Queer & Trans Women's Music Festival, Comedy at the Capitol, Comic Strip, Homo Ha!, Loudmouth Cunts, Lezberados: Comedy with No Bull, and Ethel Merman Weekend. Venues have included Club 50 West, the Whiteside Theatre Seven Nightclub Curious Comedy Theater, Club Comedy Seattle, Kontos Cellars, the MAC Club, and Cobb's Comedy Club.

== Awards and honors ==
- Queer Heroes Northwest Queer Hero Award 2018
- 2011 Pride NW Pride-in-Action Award
- Woman of Achievement Award, OR, presented by Gov Kate Brown, March 10, 2020

== Filmography ==
Year	Film/Show	Role
2024	Outstanding	Herself
2018	Sh#t I Love with Jason Stuart	Herself
2015	Absolutely Jason Stuart	Herself
2014	Portlandia	Feminist camper
2011	Heart Breaks Open	Dish! performer

== Podcasts ==
Year	Show
June 1, 2019	My Real Portland
October 21, 2018	12 Questions
March 26, 2018	The Laugh Cellar
