= Stephanie D'Agostini =

American stand-up comedian (b. 1995)

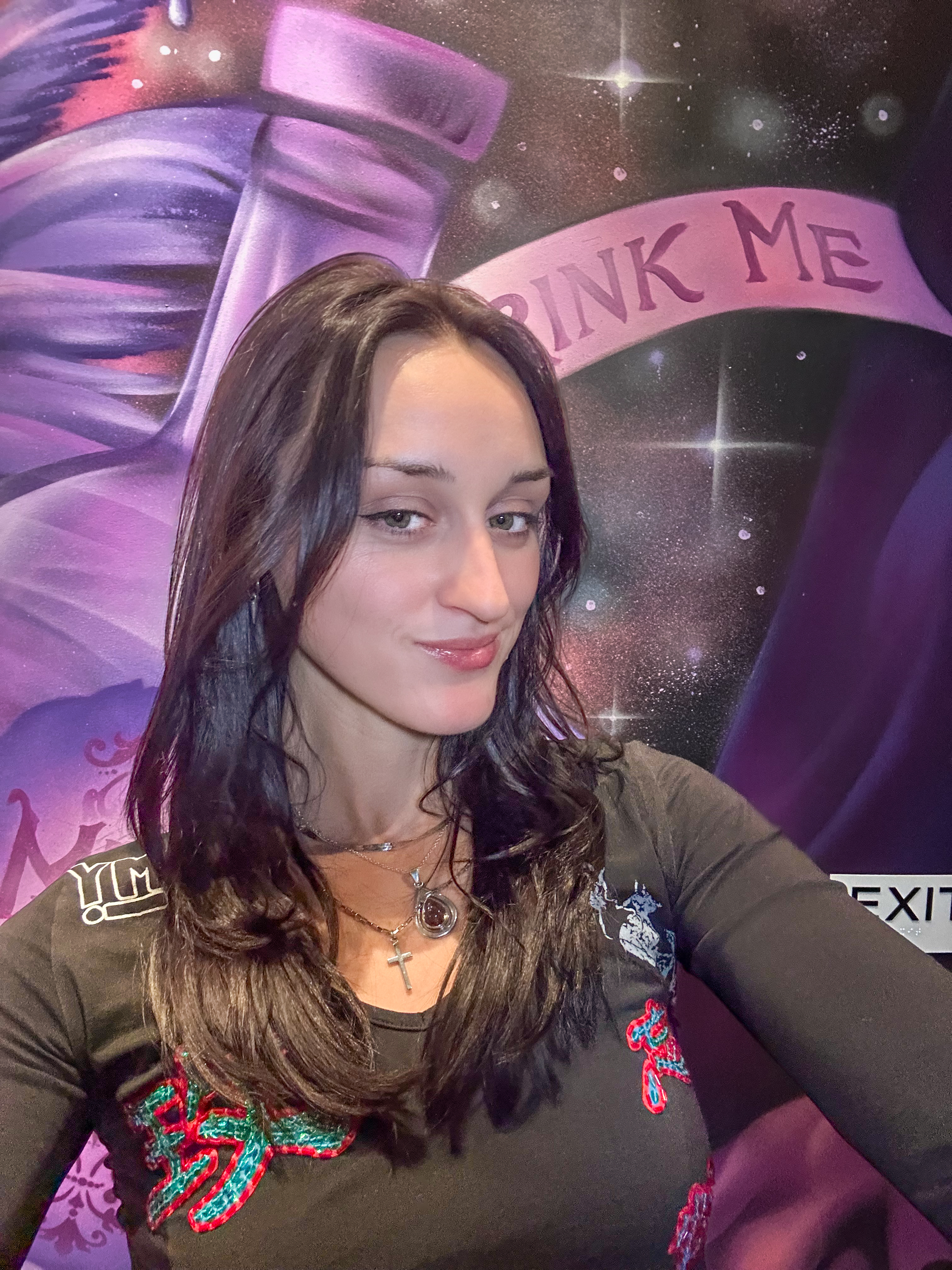
- Stef Dag at Mic Drop Comedy, San Diego on December 11, 2025
- Other name: Stef Dag (stage name)
- Education: New York University

Comedy career
- Years active: 2022–present
- Website: stefdag.substack.com

Stephanie D'Agostini, known professionally as Stef Dag, is an American comedian. She created and hosts the online comedy series Hot & Single.

== Early life ==
D'Agostini was born and raised in New Jersey. She graduated from New York University in 2017.

== Career ==
Before comedy, D'Agostini directed video shoots at Condé Nast.

She was inspired by comedian Amy Schumer and a direct message from Nikki Glaser.

D'Agostini is known for her video series “Hot & Single”. Launched on Valentine's Day 2023, it has about 400,000 followers combined across TikTok and Instagram.

She is a regular comedian at The Stand in Gramercy Park and has performed on tours at well known comedy clubs across the U.S. such as Mic Drop Comedy in San Diego and The Punch Line in San Francisco.

== Personal life ==
D'Agostini lives in the Bushwick, Brooklyn neighborhood of New York City. Her mother was born in Bosnia and Herzegovina. and her first language is Croatian. D'Agostini practices daily morning meditation or breathwork.
