= Irene Tu =

American comedian, actor, and writer (born 1992)

- Irene Tu performing in Chicago in 2026
- Born: 1992 (age 33–34); Chicago, Illinois
- Occupations: Comedian, actor, and writer

Irene Tu (born 1992) is an American comedian, actor, and writer. She has appeared at comedy festivals such as SF Sketchfest, the Portland Queer Comedy Festival, Bridgetown Comedy Festival, and Comedy Central's Clusterfest, and on shows such as Take My Wife and Funny How? In 2016, she was named one of KQED's Women to Watch and SFist listed her as one of the Bay Area's 11 Best Stand Up Comics. In 2017, the San Francisco Chronicle dubbed her as an "artist on the brink of fame". In 2019, Vulture by New York Magazine placed her on their list The Comedians You Should and Will Know in 2019, tracking "23 comics that industry insiders are watching closely". The same year, SFist listed her as one of 13 San Francisco Standup Comedians to Go See Now.

== Early life ==
Tu was born and raised in the suburbs of Chicago. An only child, her grandparents would stay with the family when they were not in their home country of China. Tu's parents separated when she reached high school.

Tu sang in elementary school chorus for several years and played piano for ten years. She also enjoyed running, soccer, and basketball and participated in scholastic bowl as well as science club in middle school. Around this time, she began teasing classmates, which she attributes to her comedic bent. She loved watching Ellen DeGeneres's The Ellen Show every day after school, which inspired Tu to google what Ellen did before she was famous for her show. She discovered that Ellen began her career as a standup comedian; this set Tu on a path toward the same profession. At age 16, she began taking classes in comedy at Second City. A closeted lesbian at the time, Tu only wrote observational comedic routines that did not reflect her personal life. Ellen DeGeneres was her main comedic inspiration.

=== Education ===
Tu attended Northwestern University for two years; she considered majoring in environmental science but ultimately found its subject matter too depressing. She then switched to economics for a semester but found she had trouble understanding the discipline. She next considered gender studies as well as Asian-American studies. However, upon transferring to the University of California, Berkeley, she found she did not care for the gender studies class offerings there, but it so happened that by then she had accumulated a number of credits in Asian-American studies, so ultimately she majored in that.

== Career ==
Tu began performing her standup while at Northwestern, which continued while she was still a student at Berkeley.

Post-college, Tu worked at Eastwind Books of Berkeley, a small bookstore one of her Asian-American studies professors owned. Also in the Bay, Tu co-founded and hosted a monthly comedy show at White Horse Bar in Oakland called Man Haters. It went on to tour nationally, with different comedians, including Tu, hosting. Additionally, she hosted Hysteria, a weekly comedy open mic for female and queer comics, which was named the East Bay Express 2016 and 2017 Best Comedy Show. In 2018, she performed at the Asian Pacific Islander Cultural Center of San Francisco's 21st Annual United States of Asian America Festival.

Relocating to Los Angeles later in 2018, Tu began performing at a variety of events such as Kids in the Yard, Very Forward!, Woman Crush Wednesdays and Gays 'R' Us at the Hollywood Improv, and Asian AF Los Angeles's Autumn Moon Rap Battle. She also began performing at venues ranging from Fais Do-Do and Dynasty Typewriter to the Ace Hotel and Geeky Teas & Games. Also in 2018, Tu was featured on Out On Stage: The Series on Pluto TV.

In 2019, Tu toured as part of Minority Retort, a Portland-based, stand-up comedy show featuring only comedians of color. Also in 2019, Tu opened for Patton Oswalt on the southwest leg of his comedy tour, hosted the Balboa Theatre's Oscars party, and hosted Comedy x Pop Up Food on a weekly basis. She performed at Oakland Pride in September 2019. She also continued touring, performing at venues such as Cobb's Comedy Club, Montgomery College's Cultural Arts Center at Silver Spring, and the Brooklyn Museum, among others.

Tu is selected as a performer for the 2020 Southland Comedy Festival. The festival organizers consider the lineup to be "20 of the most talented comedians from around the country". Tu is also slated to perform at SF Sketchfest 2020.

In March 2025, it was announced that Tu would be performing at Belly Laughs Comedy & Food Festival alongside other comedians such as Margaret Cho, Kumail Nanjiani, and Helen Hong.

== Personal life ==
Tu always knew she was "different" from a young age but did not recognize in what way. She finally realized she was gay while attending summer camp at the University of Chicago; a girl she had a crush on told her she was funny, and the realization was near-instantaneous. She had also previously had sex with a female best friend, but neither she nor the friend ever put labels of "dating", "girlfriends", or "gay" on their experiences with one another. Tu also notes that she was always drawn to female characters in cartoons and television shows and had a crush on Harry Potter actress Emma Watson.

== Filmography ==
Year	Film
2019	Straight Up, Stand Up
2019	The Report (Card)
2018	The Guest List
2018	Out On Stage
2017	Take My Wife
2016–2017	The Guest List
2016	Flophouse
