= Bill Graham (promoter) =

American rock music impresario (1931–1991)

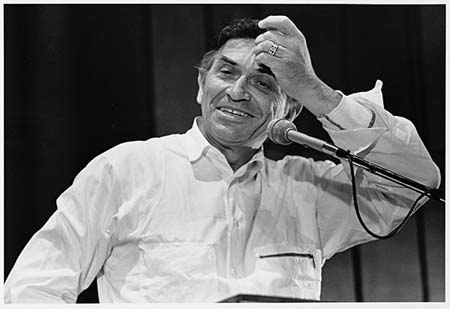
- Graham c. 1990
- Born: Wulf Wolodi Grajonca; January 8, 1931; Berlin, Germany
- Died: October 25, 1991 (aged 60); Near Vallejo, California, U.S.
- Cause of death: Helicopter crash
- Citizenship: United States (from 1949)
- Occupation: Concert promoter
- Years active: 1960s–1991
- Organization: Bill Graham Presents
- Spouse: Bonnie MacLean (m. 1967; div. 1975)
- Children: 3

Bill Graham (born Wulf Wolodia Grajonca; January 8, 1931 – October 25, 1991) was an American concert promoter. Born to a Jewish family in Berlin, he escaped Nazi persecution as a child and reached the United States as one of the One Thousand Children; his mother died on the way to Auschwitz concentration camp.

After moving to San Francisco in the early 1960s, Graham became involved with the San Francisco Mime Troupe and organized a benefit concert after its leader was arrested. He subsequently promoted rock concerts at venues including the Fillmore, Fillmore West, Fillmore East, and Winterland, presenting performers, including the Grateful Dead, Jefferson Airplane, and Big Brother and the Holding Company. He later promoted stadium concerts and large-scale benefit events, including the 1975 SNACK concert, the U.S. portion of Live Aid in 1985, and the A Conspiracy of Hope and Human Rights Now! tours for Amnesty International.

Graham died in a helicopter crash west of Vallejo, California, while returning from a concert at which he had been arranging a benefit for victims of the 1991 Oakland hills firestorm. After his death, the San Francisco Civic Auditorium was renamed the Bill Graham Civic Auditorium, and he was inducted into the Rock and Roll Hall of Fame in 1992.

== Early life ==
Graham was born on January 8, 1931, in Berlin, Germany. He was the youngest child and only son of lower middle-class Jewish parents, Frieda (née Sass) and Jacob "Yankel" Grajonca, who had emigrated from Russia before the rise of Nazism. There were six children in the Grajonca family. His father died in an accident two days after he was born. His family nicknamed him "Wolfgang" early in life.

Due to the increasing Nazi persecution of Jews and the death of his father, Bill Graham's mother placed her son and her youngest daughter, Tanya "Tolla", in a Berlin orphanage, which sent them to France in a pre-Holocaust exchange of Jewish children for Christian orphans. His older sisters, Sonja and Ester stayed behind with their mother. After the fall of France in 1940, he was among a group of Jewish orphans spirited out of France, some of whom finally reached the United States. Tolla Grajonca came down with pneumonia and did not survive the difficult journey. He was one of One Thousand Children (OTC), mainly Jewish children who managed to flee Nazi Germany and Europe and directly travel to North America, but whose parents were forced to stay behind. His mother died on the way to Auschwitz concentration camp.

At age 10, he settled into a foster home in the Bronx, New York. After being taunted as an immigrant and being called a Nazi because of his German-accented English, Bill Graham worked on his accent, eventually being able to speak in a perfect New York accent. He changed his name to sound more "American". (He found "Graham" in the phone book—it was the closest he could find to his birth surname, "Grajonca". According to Graham, both "Bill" and "Graham" were meaningless to him.) Graham graduated from DeWitt Clinton High School in the Bronx and obtained a business degree from the City College of New York. Graham was naturalized as an American citizen in 1949 and was drafted into the United States Army in 1951. He served in the Korean War, where he was awarded both the Bronze Star and Purple Heart. Returning to the U.S. he worked as a waiter/maître d' at resorts in the Catskill Mountains in upstate New York during their heyday. He was quoted saying that his experience as a maître d' and with the poker games he hosted behind the scenes was good training for his eventual career as a promoter. Tito Puente, who played some of these resorts, went on record saying that Graham was avid to learn Spanish from him, but only cared about the curse words. Graham also mentions in his bio-pic Last Days At The Fillmore once working for 3M.

== Career ==
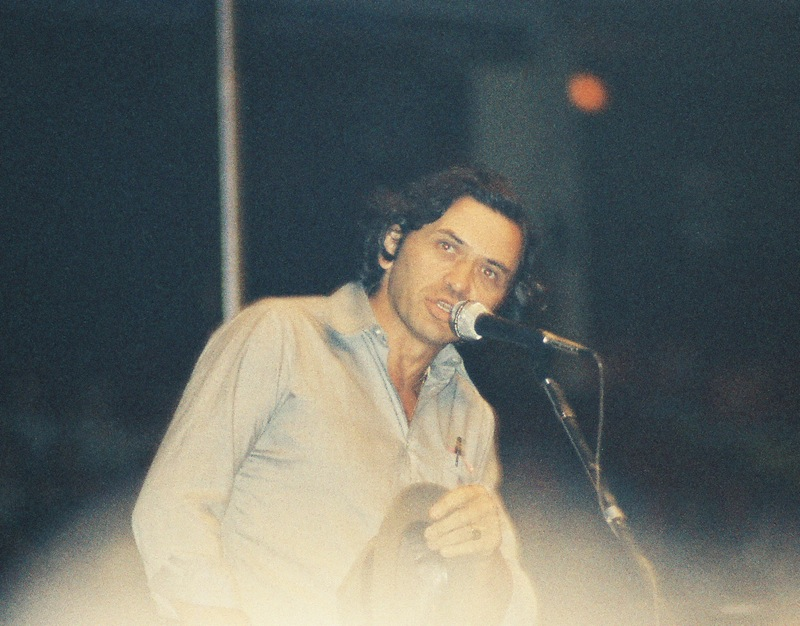
Graham in 1974

=== Fillmore Auditorium (December 10, 1965 – July 4, 1968) ===
Graham moved from New York to San Francisco in the early 1960s to be closer to his sister Rita. He was invited to attend a free concert in Golden Gate Park, produced by Chet Helms and the Diggers, where he made contact with the San Francisco Mime Troupe, a radical theater group. After Mime Troupe leader R. G. Davis was arrested on obscenity charges during an outdoor performance, Graham organized a benefit concert to cover the troupe's legal fees. The concert was a success and Graham saw a business opportunity.

Graham began promoting more concerts with Chet Helms and Family Dog projects, which provided a vital function of the 1960s, promoting concerts that provided a social meeting place to network, where many ideologies were given a forum, sometimes even on stage, such as peace movements, civil rights, farm workers and others. Most of Graham's shows were performed at rented venues, and he saw a need for more permanent locations of his own. He approached Charles Sullivan, an entrepreneur and businessman who owned the master lease on the Fillmore Auditorium, to put on the Second Mime Troupe appeals concert at the Fillmore Auditorium on December 10, 1965, using Sullivan's dance hall permit for the show. Graham later secured a contract from Sullivan for the open dates at the Fillmore Auditorium in 1966.

Mime Troupe leader R. G. Davis said, "Graham... got very excited about the success of the Fillmore Auditorium Show. He got a contract with the black guy who owned the Fillmore. He nails it. Closed." Graham faced battles with City Hall in getting a dance hall permit. By schmoozing with merchants and having criminologists and sociologists from U.C. Berkeley and U.C. Santa Cruz giving merit to the shows Graham managed to obtain a second permit hearing, but was again denied. He reported that Sullivan came to him sometime in March or April and announced he had to pull his dance hall permit. The morning of the next day, when Graham was returning to move out of his office in the Fillmore Auditorium, Sullivan met him on the steps. Graham claimed Sullivan poured out his life story, concluding with a pledge of support to Graham to beat City Hall. Graham added, "He was the guy, Charles. He was it. I don't know if I could have ever found another place. Why would I have even tried? That was the place."

Graham was denied by the Board of Permit Appeals who refused to overrule the first denial. Graham said, "Then on April 21, 1966, a Thursday, the Chronicle ran an editorial, 'The Fillmore Auditorium Case'... [I]t was a big turning point for me. In more ways than one"; he secured his permit.

Charles Sullivan was found shot dead at 1:45 am on August 2, 1966, at 5th and Bluxome Streets, San Francisco (South of Market industrial area near the train station). Sullivan had just returned from Los Angeles, where he had presented a weekend concert starring soul singer James Brown. The police have never determined whether Sullivan's death was suicide or homicide.

Sullivan was laid to rest on August 8, 1966, according to the Sun Reporter, which reported that "Last respects were paid Charles Sullivan Monday, Aug. 8, when hundreds crowded into Jones Memorial Methodist Church, 1975 Post St. from 11:30 a.m. to view Sullivan for the last time. An enormous crowd had gathered by 1 p.m. to hear the eulogy for a friend." The funeral announcement is accompanied by photographs of the actual funeral covering two pages in which police are stopping traffic to assist the motorcade to the cemetery in Colma. Graham later reported, "Charles Sullivan got himself killed. He had a bad habit of always carrying a roll of money with him. He was proud of his work and proud of the fact that he earned a good living and always carried a roll. He was jumped and stabbed to death. I went to his funeral in Colma, California. It was small, mostly family. Had that not happened, I think I would have done anything Charles wanted. Just out of gratitude."

After Graham's death on October 25, 1991, the description of his funeral procession states:

Escorted by motorcycle police, more long black limousines than had ever before been seen at a private funeral in the city of San Francisco formed a phalanx for the procession to the cemetery. Bill was to be buried in Colma, the same small town south of San Francisco filled with graveyards where so many years before Bill himself had gone to the funeral of Charles Sullivan, the black man who stood up for him when the Fillmore Auditorium was on the line.

The Sun Reporter noted:

He took over the Fillmore Auditorium at Geary and Fillmore Sts. and began to present different artists in dances and concerts. Some of the greatest names in the entertainment world, like Duke Ellington, Lionel Hampton, Count Basie, Ray Charles and numerous others, have been presented all up and down the Pacific Coast by Sullivan. He always signed these artists for presentations not only in San Francisco, but in Oakland, Los Angeles, San Diego, Portland, and Seattle."

According to the historical record, Sullivan also gave the Fillmore Auditorium its name.

Graham's struggle to get his dance hall permit in 1966 was described in an article in Billboard Magazine, July 11, 1966. San Francisco music critic Ralph Gleason, in defense of Graham's Fillmore Auditorium scene, wrote that Graham got a three-year lease for the Fillmore Auditorium from Charles Sullivan and was still struggling to procure his dance hall permit, a fact never publicly revealed by Graham. Charles Sullivan's last show at the Fillmore Auditorium came a week before his death, on July 26, 1966, The Temptations Dance and Show. Graham must have got his permit in mid-July 1966, confirming his possession of the Fillmore brand.

It was unknown how Graham had taken over the Fillmore lease until the 2004 publication of Hendrik Hertzberg's Politics Observations & Arguments (1966-2004). It contains an article, "The San Francisco Sound, New music, new subculture", at the end of which it stated, "Unpublished file for Newsweek, October 28, 1966". This article contains the only published account of how Graham acquired the Fillmore. In the beginning, Hertzberg recounts familiar territory with the Mime Troupe, reducing the Fillmore Auditorium to a run-down ballroom in "SF's biggest negro ghetto." After the success of the Fillmore Auditorium Mime Troupe shows, Graham parts ways with the Troupe: "He went back to the Fillmore and found that eleven other promoters had already put in bids for it. Graham got 41 prominent citizens to write letters to the auditorium's owner, a haberdasher named Harry Shifs, and Shifs gave him a three-year lease at five hundred dollars a month.... [T]he hippie community ... has turned out to be something the man from Montgomery Street can point to with pride, in a left-handed way, and say 'these are our boys'", stated Jerry Garcia.

One of the early concerts Graham sponsored, with Chet Helms hired to promote it, featured the Paul Butterfield Blues Band. The concert was an overwhelming success and Graham saw an opportunity with the band. Early the next morning, Graham's secretary called the band's manager, Albert Grossman, and obtained exclusive rights to promote them. Shortly thereafter, Chet Helms arrived at Graham's office, asking how Graham could have cut him out of the deal. Graham pointed out that Helms would not have known about it unless he had tried to do the same thing to Graham. He advised Helms to "get up early" in the future. Graham produced shows attracting elements of America's now-legendary 1960s counterculture such as the Jefferson Airplane, Big Brother and the Holding Company, Country Joe and the Fish, Lawrence Ferlinghetti, the Committee (improv_group), The Fugs, Allen Ginsberg, and a particular favorite of Graham's, the Grateful Dead. He was the manager of the Jefferson Airplane during 1967 and 1968. His staff's amount of resourcefulness, success, popularity, and personal contacts with artists and fans alike was one reason Graham became the top rock concert promoter in the San Francisco Bay Area.

=== Fillmore Records, Fillmore West, Fillmore East, and later ===
Graham owned Fillmore Records, which was in operation from 1969 to 1976. Some of those who signed with Graham included Rod Stewart, Elvin Bishop, and Cold Blood, although of these it seems only Bishop actually issued albums on the Fillmore label. Tower of Power was signed to Bill Graham's San Francisco Records and their first album, East Bay Grease, was recorded in 1970.

By 1971, Graham citing financial reasons and changes he saw as unwelcome in the music industry, closed the Fillmore East and West, claiming a need to "find [himself]". The movie Fillmore and the album Fillmore: The Last Days document the closing of the Fillmore West. Graham later returned to promoting. He began organizing concerts at smaller venues, like the Berkeley Community Theatre on the campus of Berkeley High School. He then reopened the Winterland Arena (San Francisco), along with the Fillmore West, and promoted shows at the Cow Palace Arena in Daly City and other venues.

In 1973 he did the staging for Jimmy Koplic and Shelly Finkle's promotion of the Summer Jam at Watkins Glen rock festival at Watkins Glen, New York with The Band, Grateful Dead, and The Allman Brothers Band. Over 600,000 paying ticket-holders were in attendance. He continued promoting stadium-sized concerts at Kezar Stadium in San Francisco with Led Zeppelin in 1973 and 1977 and started a series of outdoor stadium concerts at the Oakland Coliseum each billed as Day on the Green in 1973 until 1992. The concerts featured billings such as the Grateful Dead and The Who on October 9, 1976, and the Grateful Dead and Bob Dylan in 1987.

His first large-scale outdoor benefit concert, at Kezar Stadium, on Sunday, March 23, 1975, "SF SNACK", was organized to replace funds for after-school programs canceled by the San Francisco Unified School District, with performances by Bob Dylan, Neil Young, members of The Band and Grateful Dead, Jefferson Starship, Mimi Fariña, Joan Baez, Santana, Tower of Power, Jerry Garcia & Friends, The Doobie Brothers, Eddie Palmieri & His Orchestra, The Miracles, Graham Central Station, and appearing : Marlon Brando, Francis Ford Coppola, Frankie Albert, John Brodie, Rosie Casals, Werner Erhard, Cedric Hardman, Willie Mays, Jesse Owens, Gene Washington, Cecil Williams

Graham as Bill Graham Presents booked the 1982 US Festival, funded by Steve Wozniak as Unuson. In the mid-1980s, in conjunction with the city of Mountain View, California, and Apple Inc. cofounder Steve Wozniak, he masterminded the creation of the Shoreline Amphitheatre, which became the premier venue for outdoor concerts in Silicon Valley, complementing his booking of the East Bay Concord Pavilion. Throughout his career, Graham promoted benefit concerts. He then set the standard for well-produced large-scale rock concerts, such as the U.S. portion of Live Aid at JFK Stadium in Philadelphia on July 13, 1985, as well as the 1986 A Conspiracy of Hope and 1988 Human Rights Now! tours for Amnesty International.

Graham purchased comedy club The Punch Line and The Old Waldorf on Battery Street in San Francisco from local promoter Jeffrey Pollack, with whom he remained close friends for the rest of his life, then Wolfgang's, also a Jeffrey Pollack venue, on Columbus Ave in San Francisco.

== Personal life ==
=== Family ===
Bill Graham had five sisters, Rita Rose; Evelyn (or "Echa") Udray; Sonja (or "Sonia") Szobel; Ester Chichinsky; and Tanya (or "Tolla") Grajonca. His youngest sister Tolla died of pneumonia while fleeing the Holocaust. Rita and Ester moved to the United States and were close to Graham in his later life. Evelyn and Sonja escaped the Holocaust, first to Shanghai, and later, after the war, to Europe. Graham's nephew and Sonia Szobel's son is musician Hermann Szobel.

Graham and Bonnie MacLean married on June 11, 1967. They had a son, David (born 1968); after many years of not living together the couple divorced in 1975. With Marcia Sult Godinez, Graham had another son; Alex Graham-Sult and a stepson, Thomas Sult.

=== Home estate ===
The residence Jake Ehrlich designed with a sliding glass roof at the top of Camino Alto Road, in Marin County in Northern California, was later owned by Graham. For many years Graham lived in Corte Madera, California on an 11-acre estate with a ranch-style house he named "Masada" after the ancient mountain fort in Israel with the same name. The house was replaced in the early 2000s and later occupied by WeWork CEO, Adam Neumann.

=== Bitburg controversy ===
Graham's status as a Holocaust survivor came into play in 1985, during the presidency of Ronald Reagan. When Graham learned that Reagan intended to lay a wreath at Bitburg's World War II cemetery where SS soldiers were also buried, he took out a full-page ad in the San Francisco Chronicle in protest. During the same month that Reagan visited the cemetery, Graham's San Francisco office was firebombed by Neo-Nazis. Graham was in France at the time meeting with Bob Geldof to organize the first Live Aid concert. Graham eventually led an effort to build a large menorah which is lit during every Hanukkah in downtown San Francisco.

=== Acting ===
Graham had long dreamed of being a character actor. He appeared in Apocalypse Now in a small role as a promoter. In 1990, he was cast as Charles "Lucky" Luciano in the film Bugsy. During one scene, he is shown in a Latin dance number, a style of dancing Graham had embraced as a teenager in New York. He also appears as a promoter in the 1991 Oliver Stone film The Doors, which he co-produced. He had a small part in Gardens of Stone as Don Brubaker, a hippie anti-war protester.

== Death ==
Graham died in a helicopter crash west of Vallejo, California, on October 25, 1991, while returning home from a Huey Lewis and the News concert at the Concord Pavilion. He had attended the event to discuss promoting a benefit concert for the victims of the 1991 Oakland hills firestorm. Once he had obtained a commitment from Huey Lewis to perform, he departed by helicopter, which collided with a high-voltage tower in Sonoma County. Other fatalities included pilot and advance man Steve "Killer" Kahn, and Graham's girlfriend, Melissa Gold (née Dilworth), ex-wife of author Herbert Gold.

== Aftermath and tributes ==
After his death, his company, Bill Graham Presents (BGP), was taken over by a group of employees. Graham's sons remained a core part of the new management team. The new owners sold the company to SFX Promotions, which in turn sold the company to Clear Channel Entertainment. The BGP staff did not embrace the Clear Channel name and several members of the Graham staff eventually left the company. Former BGP President/CEO Gregg Perloff and Sherry Wasserman, the former senior vice president left and began their own company, Another Planet Entertainment.

In tribute, the San Francisco Civic Auditorium was renamed the Bill Graham Civic Auditorium. On November 3, 1991, a free concert called "Laughter, Love and Music" was held at Golden Gate Park to honor Graham, Gold and Kahn. An estimated 300,000 people attended to view many of the entertainment acts Graham had supported including Santana, the Grateful Dead, John Fogerty, Robin Williams, Journey (reunited), and Crosby, Stills, Nash & Young (reunited). The video for "I'll Get By" from Eddie Money's album Right Here was dedicated to Graham. Graham's images and poster artwork still adorn the office walls at Live Nation's new San Francisco office. With the band Hardline, Neal Schon of Journey composed a piece entitled "31–91" in 1992 in Graham's honor. Bill Graham was inducted into the "Rock and Roll Hall of Fame" in 1992 in the "Non-Performer" category. He was inducted into the Rock Radio Hall of Fame in the "Without Whom" category in 2014.

== See also ==
- Bill Graham Archives v. Dorling Kindersley, Ltd., 448 F.3d 605 (2d Cir. 2006)—fair use
