= Bonnie MacLean =

American artist (1939–2020)

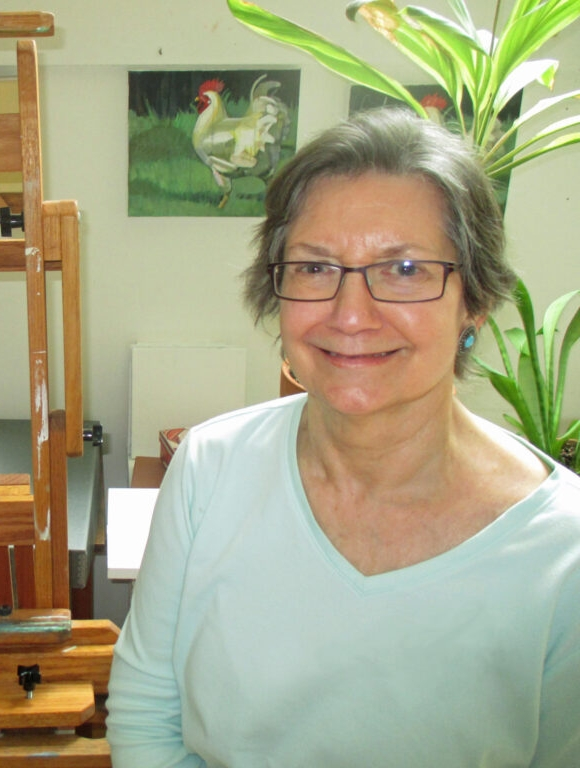
- MacLean in 2015
- Born: December 28, 1939; Philadelphia, Pennsylvania, U.S.
- Died: February 4, 2020 (aged 80); Newtown, Pennsylvania, U.S.
- Known for: Artist
- Spouse: Bill Graham (divorced)

Bonnie MacLean (December 28, 1939 – February 4, 2020), also known as Bonnie MacLean Graham, was an American artist known for her classic rock posters. In the 1960s and 1970s she created posters and other art for the promotion of rock and roll concerts managed by Bill Graham, using the iconic psychedelic art style of the day. MacLean continued her art as a painter focusing mostly on nudes, still lifes, and landscapes. Her work has been placed alongside the "big five"—male Haight-Ashbury poster artists who were seminal to the "iconography of the counterculture scene."

== Early life ==
Bonnie MacLean was born on December 28, 1939, in Philadelphia, and grew up in nearby Trenton, New Jersey.

She graduated from Pennsylvania State University in 1961 with a degree in French. She moved to New York after graduating college, where she worked at the Pratt Institute and took drawing classes in the evenings. MacLean moved to San Francisco in 1963, where she met Bill Graham who had been her boss at her office job at Allis-Chalmers.

Throughout her life MacLean continued to study art, taking courses at the Academy of Art University, the San Francisco Art Institute, and the California College of Arts and Crafts.

== Fillmore posters ==
Artist Wes Wilson was the main poster artist for The Fillmore when he and Bill Graham had a "falling out" and Wilson quit. MacLean had been painting noticeboards at the auditorium in the psychedelic style, and took up the creation of the posters after Wilson left, creating more than thirty posters, most in 1967. Some of her posters have been sold for $10,000, and are highly valued in the collectors' market.

Using 14 by 21 inches (360 mm × 530 mm) boards, her concert posters were "vivid, hand-drawn bills" in an Art Nouveau style. She developed her own motif, with "elaborate plumes, curving letters and stoic faces." MacLean's style was inspired by imagery of the Medieval Gothic era, such as circular stained glass windows and pointed arches. During her four-year run at the Fillmore, she rendered posters for Jefferson Airplane, Grateful Dead, Jimi Hendrix, Led Zeppelin, Pink Floyd, Santana, The Allman Brothers Band, The Doors, The Who, and The Yardbirds. Getting concert attendance was her first goal. As she told the Bucks County Courier Times, "I could do what I wanted, but the object was for people to notice the poster and hopefully come out." She was a "driving force" in the San Francisco rock music scene, and her posters were instrumental in promoting The Fillmore Auditorium's success.

The Summer of Love: Art of the Psychedelic Era" exhibition began in 2005 at the Tate Liverpool, and in 2007 the exhibition traveled to the Whitney Museum of American Art which showcased her posters. Her favorite poster was "BG #75" which displays an orange and blue color peacock and its elaborate tail with white and green accents around a human face. Next to it were the names of famous bands all scheduled to perform at The Fillmore in San Francisco – the Yardbirds, the James Cotton Blues Band, Richie Havens and the Doors.

In 2015, she reprised her earlier work to commemorate the opening of the Philadelphia Fillmore.

Her posters are iconic. MacLean's posters are included in many museum collections including at the Brooklyn Museum, the Fine Arts Museums of San Francisco collection and at the De Young Museum, and the San Francisco Museum of Modern Art, among others. MacLean's artwork was a part of the 2013–2014 exhibition, Designing Modern Women 1890–1990 at the Museum of Modern Art in New York City.

== Personal life ==
MacLean and Bill Graham married on June 11, 1967. They had one child, David Wolodia Graham, born in 1968. MacLean and Graham eventually separated, after sustaining many strains on their relationship, such as Graham's extramarital affairs and missing of their son's birth. After several years of separation, they divorced in 1975.

MacLean returned to Pennsylvania in 1972. In 1981, she married painter Jacques Fabert (1925–2013), whom she'd met in 1971 when he was her art teacher. She lived in rural Bucks County, Pennsylvania.

MacLean died on February 4, 2020, at age 80, at the Buckingham Valley Rehabilitation and Nursing Center in Newtown, Pennsylvania. No cause of death was reported.
