= Governor's Comedy Club =

Comedy venue in Levittown, New York

- Interactive map of Governor's Comedy Club
- Address: 90 Division Avenue
- Location: Levittown, New York 11756
- Coordinates: 40.7270°N 73.5261°W

Construction
- Opened: 1985

Website
- govs.govs.com

Governor's Comedy Club is an American comedy club in Levittown, New York, on Long Island, opened in 1985. It hosts a variety of comedians from local talent, to national headliners such as Kevin James, Nick DiPaolo, Andrew Dice Clay, and Gilbert Gottfried.

== Description ==
Governor's has two sister clubs also on Long Island: The Brokerage Comedy Club & Vaudeville Cafe (opened in 1980) in Bellmore and McGuire's in Bohemia. It also had a former club, Gateway, located in Medford; Gateway had closed temporarily but has since re-opened, now based out of the Clarion Hotel in Ronkonkoma. Though not run by the Governor's group, they will occasionally hold shows at any of the three Governor's clubs. Governor's also formerly operated a summer-only showroom inside the Memory Motel in Montauk.

They all hold comedy classes, which train up and coming comedians on comedy writing and performance styles, resulting in a "Graduation Show" at either the Governor's, Brokerage or McGuire's clubs.

In 2017, Governor's opened "The Lil' Room", which is a smaller and more intimate 60-seat showroom located within Governor's of Levittown, separate from the club's main showroom; in 2022, the room's name was changed to "The Giggle Room" and the size of the room itself was expanded to seat around 90 people. In 2020, during the COVID-19 pandemic, they opened a third stage at their Levittown location, "The Patio", located outdoors adjacent to the club; shows on the Patio are usually held during the warmer months of the year.
