= Old Waldorf =

Coordinates: 37°47′43.3″N 122°23′59.4″W

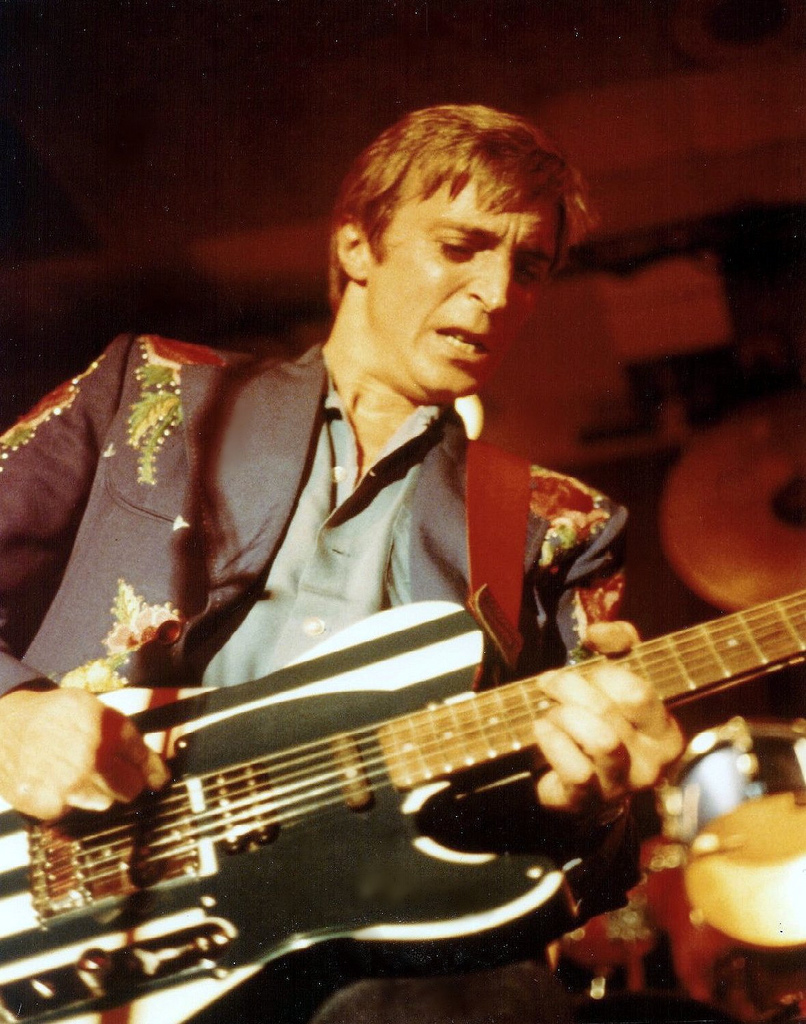
Mick Ronson at the Old Waldorf in 1981.

Old Waldorf was a music venue located in San Francisco, California. The famous club was originally on California street before moving to 444 Battery St, and was originally opened by Jeffrey Pollack in 1976 before selling it to Bill Graham who closed it in 1983. During its time Old Waldorf hosted some of the biggest names in the music industry, such as Warren Zevon, AC/DC, Devo, Dire Straits, Blue Öyster Cult, Iggy Pop, Blondie, Rory Gallagher, Cheap Trick, Metallica, Exodus, Pat Benatar, Journey, R.E.M., Television, Spirit, Poco, Afrika Bambaataa, Gary Moore, U2, Dead Kennedys, Albert King, The Tubes, Elvin Bishop, Les Paul, Peter Tosh, Captain Beefheart and many more.

The Punch Line comedy club now occupies part of Old Waldorf's location.
