= Punch Line San Francisco =

Comedy club in San Francisco

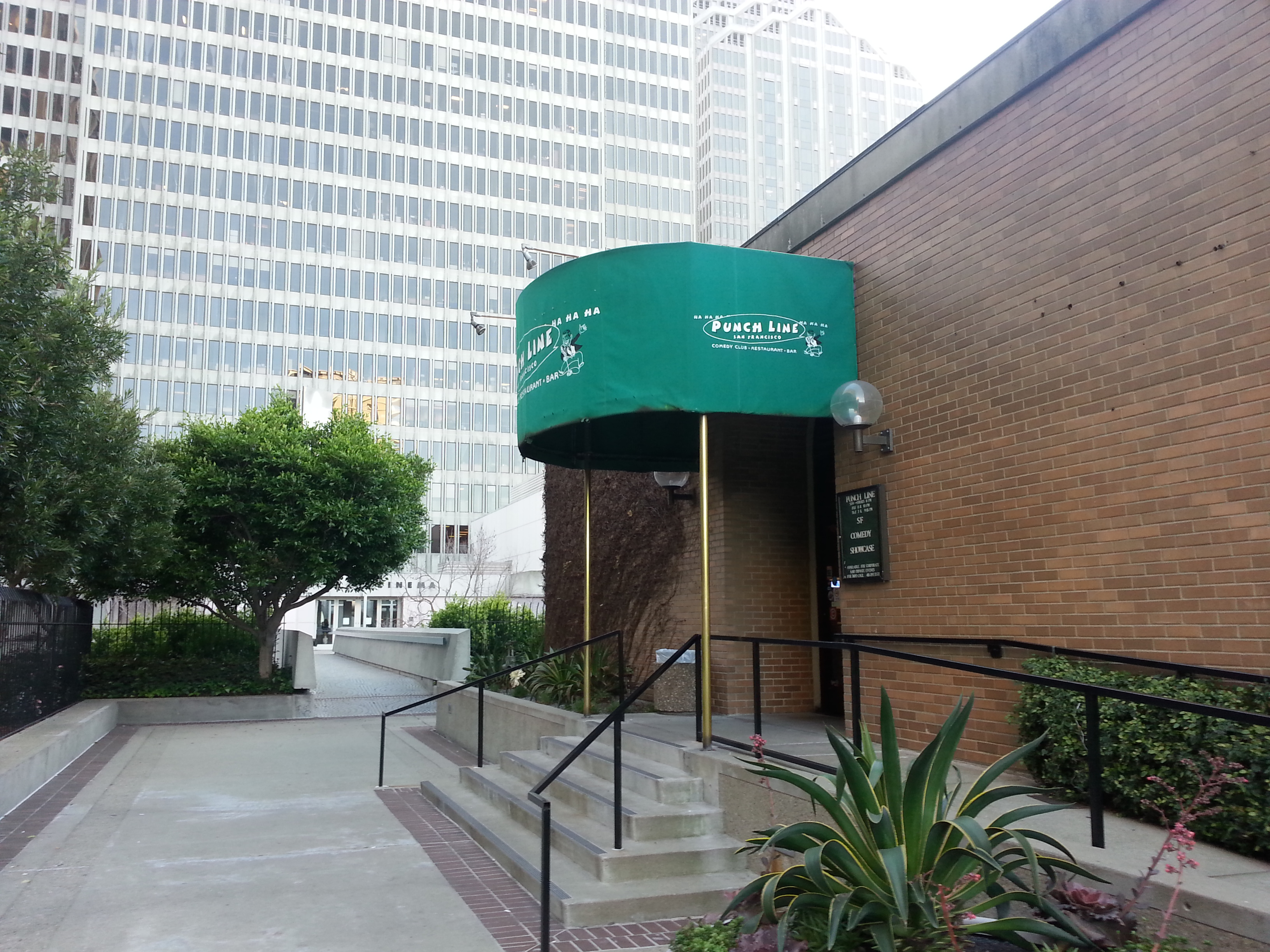
- Punch Line San Francisco entrance
- Interactive map of Punch Line San Francisco
- Address: 444 Battery St
- Location: San Francisco, California
- Coordinates: 37.795539°N 122.399965°W
- Owner: Live Nation
- Capacity: Main room: 182
- Type: Comedy club

Construction
- Opened: 1978

Website
- www.punchlinecomedyclub.com

Punch Line San Francisco is a comedy club located at 444 Battery St in San Francisco's Financial District. It has a sister club in Sacramento, California, and is also associated with Cobb's Comedy Club, now in the North Beach neighborhood of San Francisco. It is San Francisco's oldest running comedy club.

The club was originally a restaurant during the day and the backstage hangout for The Old Waldorf nightclub next door at night.

— Bobby Slayton

== History ==
The Punch Line was opened, circa October 1978, by Jeffrey Pollack and sold to Bill Graham in 1981. The building was adjacent to the Old Waldorf, a music venue originally opened in 1976 whose owner (Jeffrey Pollack) booked all the acts he could find, including music legends such as U2, Metallica, Dire Straits, Elvis Costello, R.E.M., AC/DC, and more.

The Punch Line San Francisco, the Punch Line Sacramento, and Cobb's Comedy Club were all owned and operated by Bill Graham Presents up until the death of Bill Graham in 1991. The company was taken over by a group of employees who later sold it to SFX Promotions. It was subsequently sold to Clear Channel Entertainment. On December 21, 2005, Clear Channel Communications completed the spin-off of Live Nation, formerly known as Clear Channel Entertainment. Live Nation is an independent company (NYSE: LYV) and is no longer owned by Clear Channel.

Comics such as Robin Williams, Ellen DeGeneres, Rosie O'Donnell, Drew Carey, Chris Rock, Patton Oswalt, and Dana Carvey took their first comedic steps on the Punch Line stage. The Punch Line's dedication to comic tradition has earned it the San Francisco Examiner and the San Francisco Chronicle's Readers' Choice Award for the Best Comedy Club. Today, The Punch Line is the only full-time comedy club in San Francisco.

In May 2019, the club announced it could not renew its lease with the current property owners (a subsidiary of Morgan Stanley) and was looking for a new location. Stand-up comic Dave Chappelle launched a #savethepunchline campaign and rallied SF city supervisor Aaron Peskin and Bay Area comedians W. Kamau Bell and Nato Green. In July 2019, an agreement was reached between Morgan Stanley, Google (new tenant of the building complex) and the Punch Line to secure the renewal of the lease. The club also received the Legacy Business status from the city of San Francisco, which safeguards the club as a cultural institution.

== Venue ==
The Punch Line San Francisco is open for business almost every Tuesday through Sunday to ticket-holders ages 18+ with valid photo I.D. The box office is open on show days from 3:00 – 6:00 p.m. There is a two drink minimum per person. Cameras and video/audio recording devices are not permitted.

== Sister clubs ==
Cobb's Comedy Club is located in the North Beach neighborhood of San Francisco and has been a comedy staple in the city for more than 30 years.

Punch Line Sacramento is Sacramento’s premier comedy club, and was opened and operated by Bill Graham Presents in 1991 as an expansion of the Punch Line San Francisco.

== Notable comedians ==
- Robin Williams
- Franklyn Ajaye
- Dave Chappelle
- Ellen DeGeneres
- Rosie O'Donnell
- Drew Carey
- Chris Rock
- Dana Carvey
- Margaret Cho
- Louis CK
- Bobby Slayton
- Wanda Sykes
- Greg Giraldo
- Jim Gaffigan
- Sarah Silverman
- Zach Galifianakis
- Dave Attell
- Daniel Tosh
- Ngaio Bealum
- Aziz Ansari
- George Lopez
- David Cross
- Pappas & Diederich
- Greg Proops
- Paul F. Tompkins
- Ron Funches
- Al Madrigal
- Patrice O'Neal
- Greg Fitzsimmons
- Maria Bamford
- Dana Gould
- Mitch Fatel
- Brian Posehn
- Will Durst
- Marcella Arguello
- Greg Behrendt
- Patton Oswalt
- Doug Benson
- Mitch Hedberg
- Lewis Black
- Bill Burr
- Demetri Martin
- Jim Norton
- W. Kamau Bell
- Arj Barker
- Jim Short
- Tony Camin
- Robert Schimmel
- Doug Stanhope
- Paul Mooney
- Tom Rhodes
- Jay Leno
- Garry Shandling
- Jerry Seinfeld
- Dat Phan
- Kevin McDonald
- Kevin Pollak
- Barry Sobel
- John Mulaney
- Hasan Minhaj
- Sue Murphy
- Laurie Kilmartin
