= Portland Queer Comedy Festival =

Comedy festival in Portland, Oregon

- Status: Defunct
- Genre: Comedy
- Frequency: Annually
- Location: Portland, Oregon
- Inaugurated: July 2017
- Founders: Belinda Carroll, Andy Barrett
- Most recent: July 2019

The Portland Queer Comedy Festival was an annual five-day comedy festival that took place in Portland, Oregon from 2017 to 2019. It was founded by comedian Belinda Carroll and entertainment venue owner Andy Barrett, both queer activists. It included traditional standup showcases, industry panels, podcasts, drag bingo, parody game shows, strip shows, and drag bingo featuring performers such as Valerie DeVille and Bolivia Carmichaels. Multiple venues were used throughout the festival's stretch, and upwards of 50 comedians performed. Comics such as Bruce Villanch, Irene Tu, Mary Jane French, Danielle Radford, Guy Branum, Jeffery Jay, Corina Lucas, Scott Thompson, and James Adomian participated. There was no Portland Queer Comedy Festival in 2020 due to the COVID-19 pandemic, and it did not return the following years.

== See also ==
- Culture of Portland, Oregon
- LGBTQ culture in Portland, Oregon
