= Mic Drop Comedy =

Comedy club and restaurant in San Diego, California

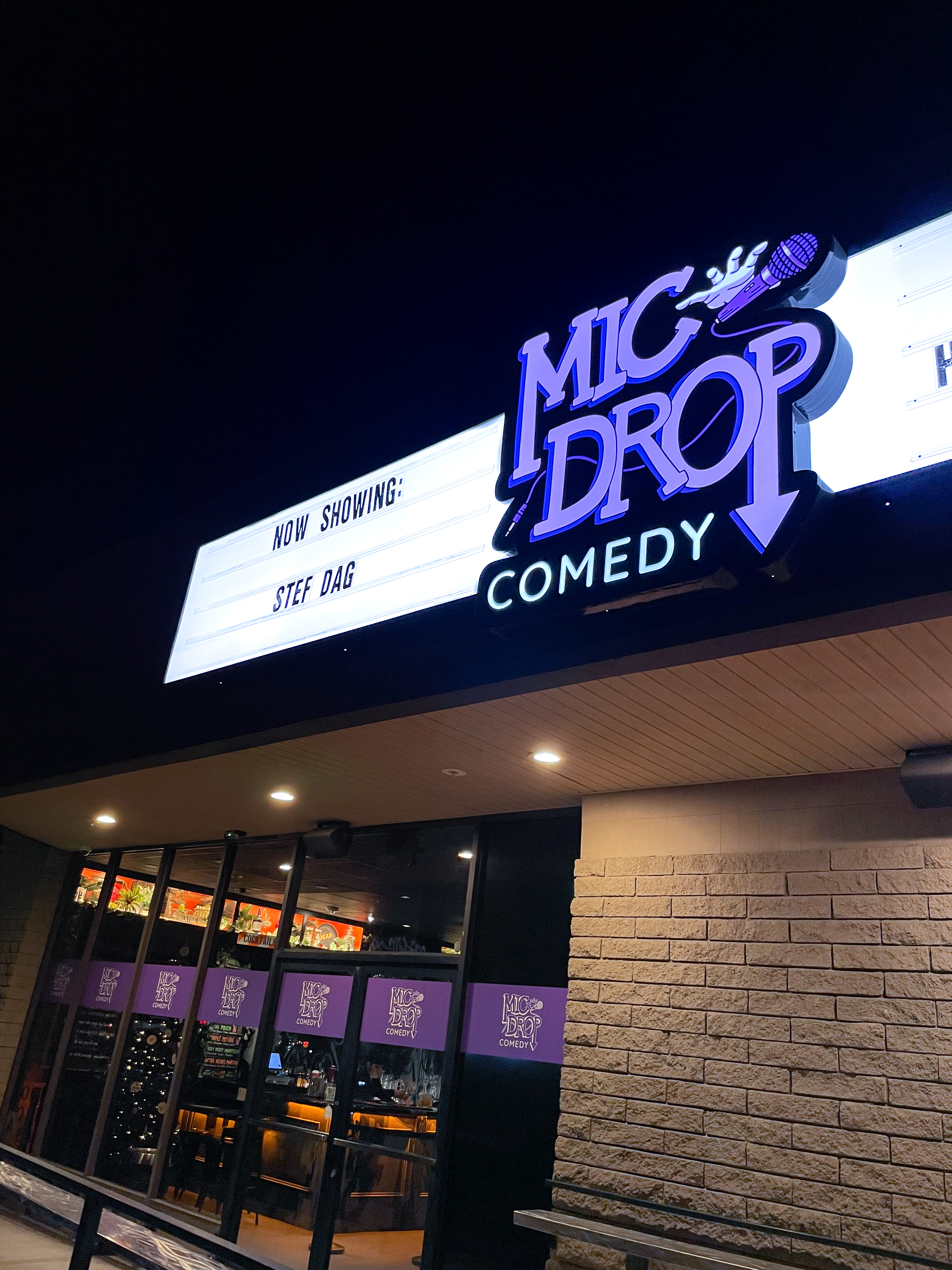
- Location: 8878 Clairemont Mesa Blvd, San Diego, California
- Type: Comedy club

Construction
- Opened: March 2022

Website
- https://www.micdropcomedysandiego.com/

Mic Drop Comedy is a live comedy club in San Diego.

The San Diego club, which opened in 2022, is located at 8878 Clairemont Mesa Blvd in San Diego, and includes a 225-seat Mainroom, and a smaller 50-seat "Gold Room". The location was previously the Comedy Palace for about 30 years.

A full-service restaurant and bar menu is available before and during shows.

== Acts ==
In February 2025, comedian Jiaoying Summers performed shows at Mic Drop Comedy. In December 2025, comedians Michael Blackson, Stef Dag, Shayne Smith, Matt Kirshen, Hannibal Buress, Learnmore Jonasi, and Jared Freid performed in the Main Room.

== Diversity ==
Mic Drop Comedy hosts a diverse variety of comedians, e.g. Latina & Filipina, and LGBTQ.
