= Cobb's Comedy Club =

Comedy venue in San Francisco

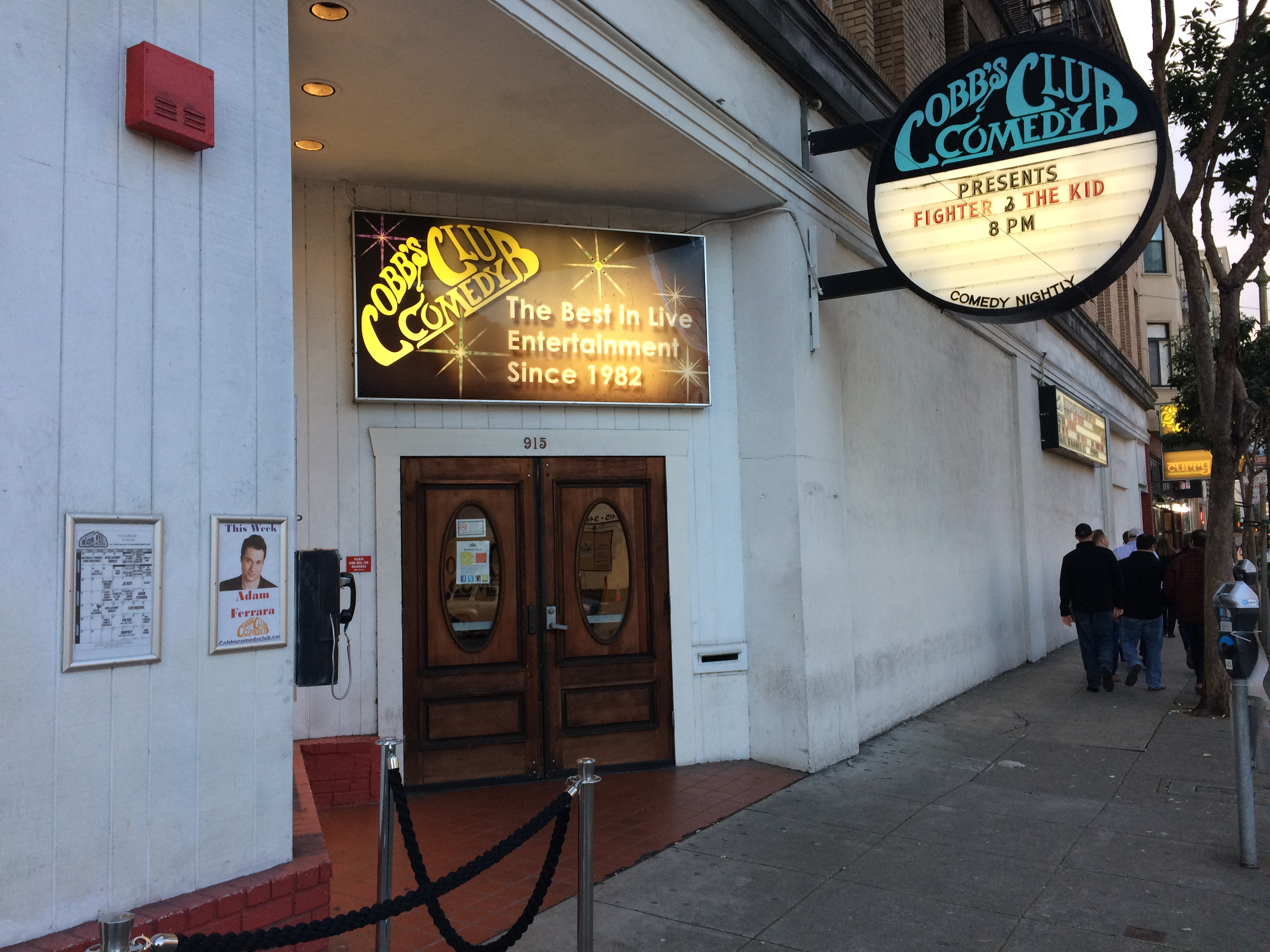
- Interactive map of Cobb's Comedy Club
- Former names: Cobb's Pub
- Address: 915 Columbus Avenue
- Location: San Francisco, California
- Coordinates: 37.8029°N 122.4143°W
- Owner: Live Nation
- Capacity: 400
- Type: Comedy club

Construction
- Opened: 1982

Website
- www.cobbscomedyclub.com

Cobb's Comedy Club is a stand-up comedy venue in San Francisco's North Beach neighborhood. It was founded in 1982, and has had many top comedians on its stage.

== History ==
=== Chestnut Street ===
"Femprov....worked with a construction manager to design the stage and transform the original Cobb's Pub in San Francisco from a local Marina bar to a very successful Comedy Club..."

"Terry Sand (a member of Femprov) finds (1981) and consults with Ron Kakiki (throughout the summer) to help transform his small neighborhood bar...."

Originally known as Cobb's Pub, it became Cobb's Comedy Club, operated by Ron Kakiki and John Cantu in 1982 at 2069 Chestnut Street in San Francisco's Marina District.

=== The Cannery ===
In 1987, it moved to the Cannery Shopping Center in the historic Fisherman's Wharf, San Francisco neighborhood, where it thrived for over a decade with owners Tom and Carolyn Sawyer, who went on to run the venue for more than 25 years.

In March 2002 a five-alarm fire broke out at The Cannery. Damage from the fire and subsequent flooding closed Cobb's for a month before forcing the Sawyers into a lawsuit which eventually resulted in the club's eviction from the building.

=== Columbus Avenue ===
With the help of some prominent comedian friends, the Sawyers raised enough money to reopen Cobb's in November 2002 at 915 Columbus Avenue in San Francisco's North Beach neighborhood. where, as of August 2022, it remains.

The Columbus Avenue location was formerly the Italian Village (Turk Murphy, 1952–1954), The Boarding House (nightclub), later "Dance Your Ass Off" (disco), later X's, later Wolfgang's (rock).

== Nearby clubs ==
Punch Line San Francisco is San Francisco's longest-running comedy club, and a sister club of Cobb's Comedy Club. The Punch Line was owned and operated by Bill Graham in 1978 next to the rock venue formerly known as the Old Waldorf.

Punch Line Sacramento, a comedy club in Sacramento, was opened and operated by Bill Graham Presents in 1991 as an expansion of the comedy club of the same name in San Francisco.
