= Comedy club =

Venue where comedy is performed

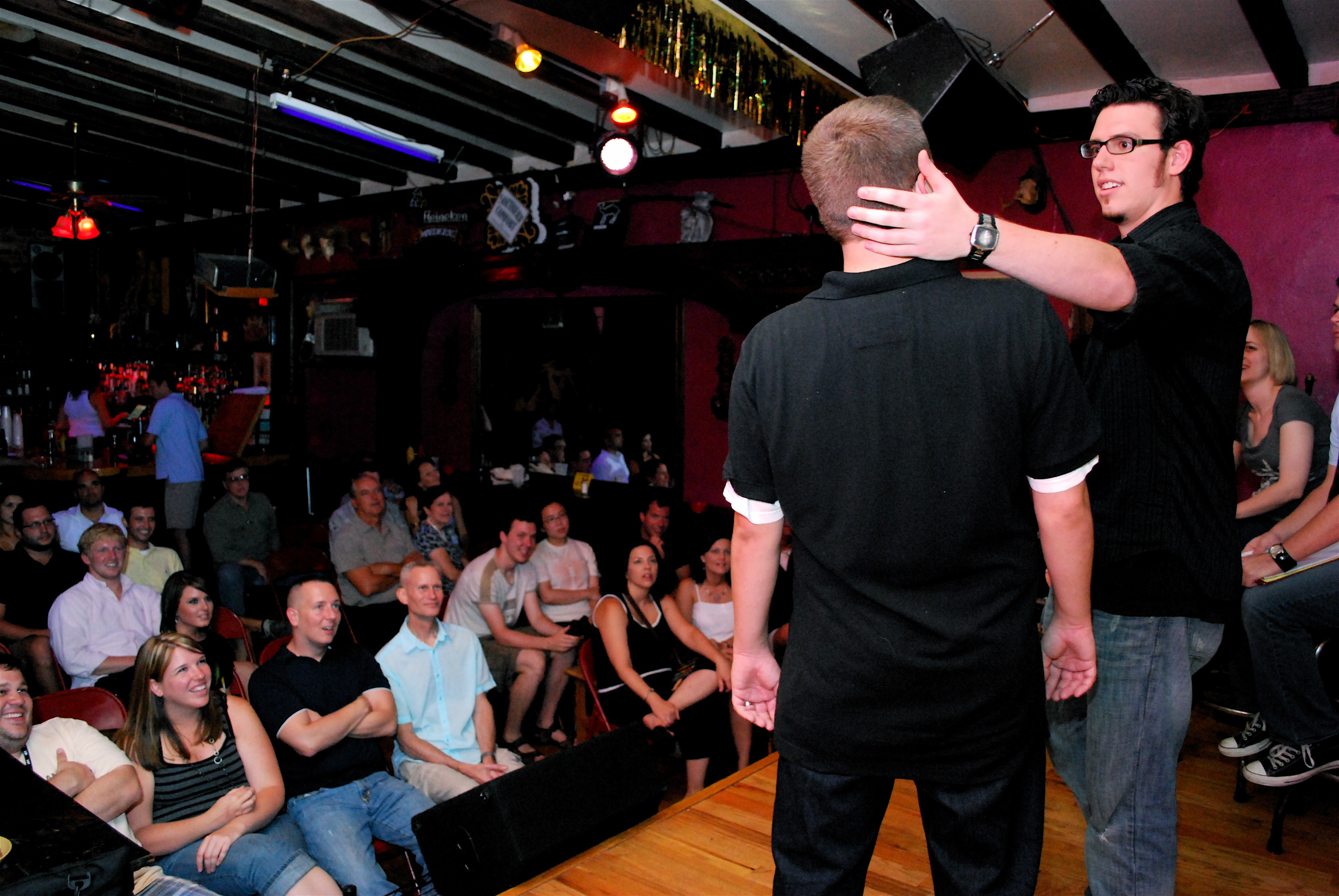
Audience and performers at a comedy club improv night

A comedy club or comedy venue is where a variety of comedic acts perform to a live audience. Although the term usually refers to establishments that feature stand-up comedians, it can also feature other forms of comedy such as improvisational comedians, impersonators, impressionists, magicians and ventriloquists.

Some forms of comedy can have distinguished venues such as improvisational theatres, which host improv or sketch comedy, and variety clubs which may also host musical acts along with comedic acts.

== History ==
=== Japan ===
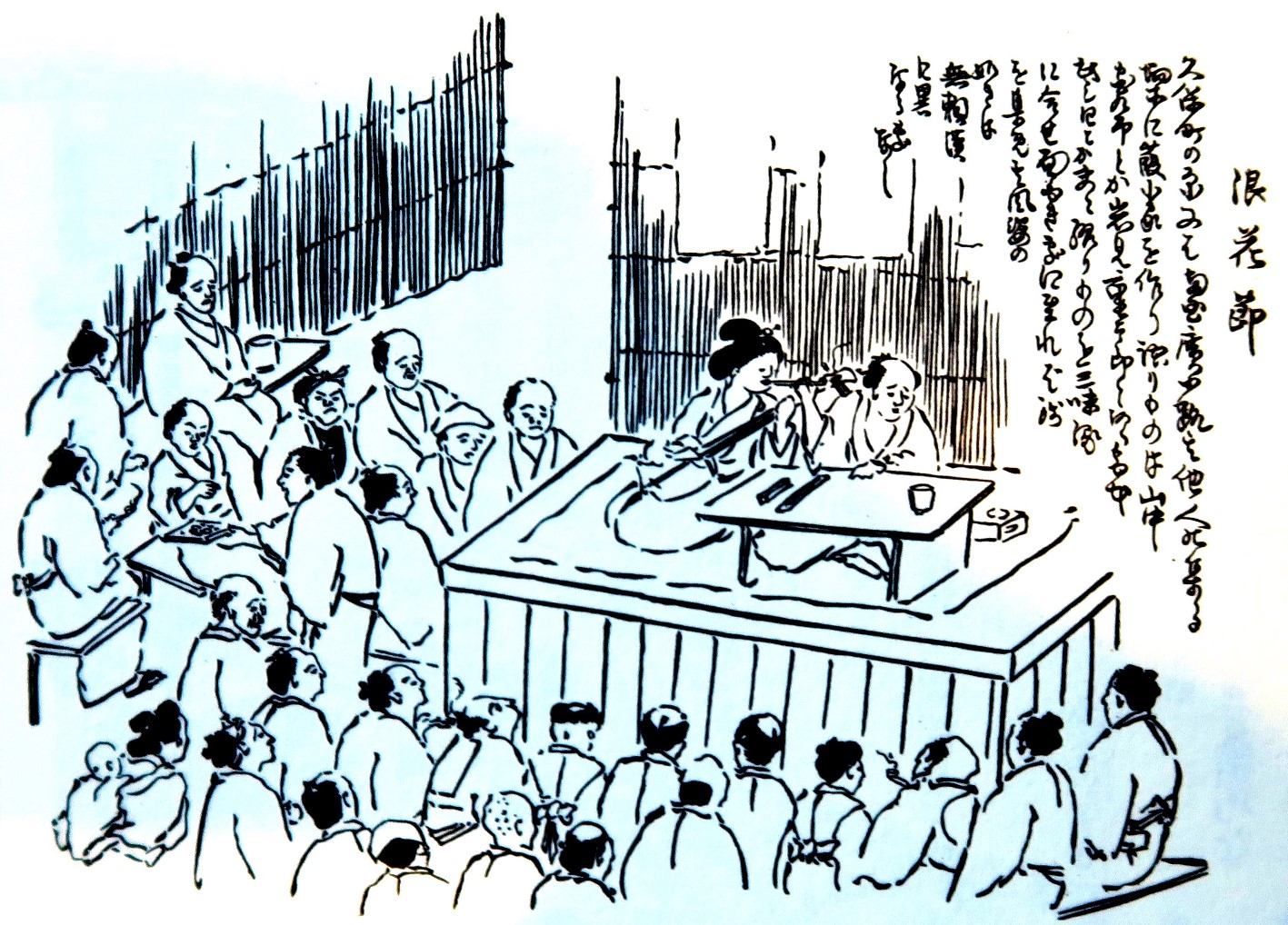
Depiction of a 19th-century yose theatre

In the 19th century, yose theatres began to grow in popularity in Japan. As a variety hall, yose theatres featured primarily music, as well as spoken word and comedy. In February 1842, several bans were put in place, as part of the Tenpō Reforms, resulting in the closure of almost all yose in Edo. Those that were not closed down were forced to limit their shows to traditional arts, such as providing lectures on Shinto or Confucianism. Popularity recovered following a removal of the bans in December 1844.

=== United States ===
The Improv opened as a coffee house in 1963, within the Hell's Kitchen neighborhood of New York City. While it hosted its first comedian in 1964, 5 years before Dangerfield's opening in 1969, it only shifted into a comedy club after hours. The Improv became exclusively a comedy club over the years, before its closing in 1992.

Dangerfield's was built ground-up as a comedy club on the Upper East Side of Manhattan. It closed due to the pandemic in 2020, later re-opening as Rodney's Comedy Club.

== Design ==
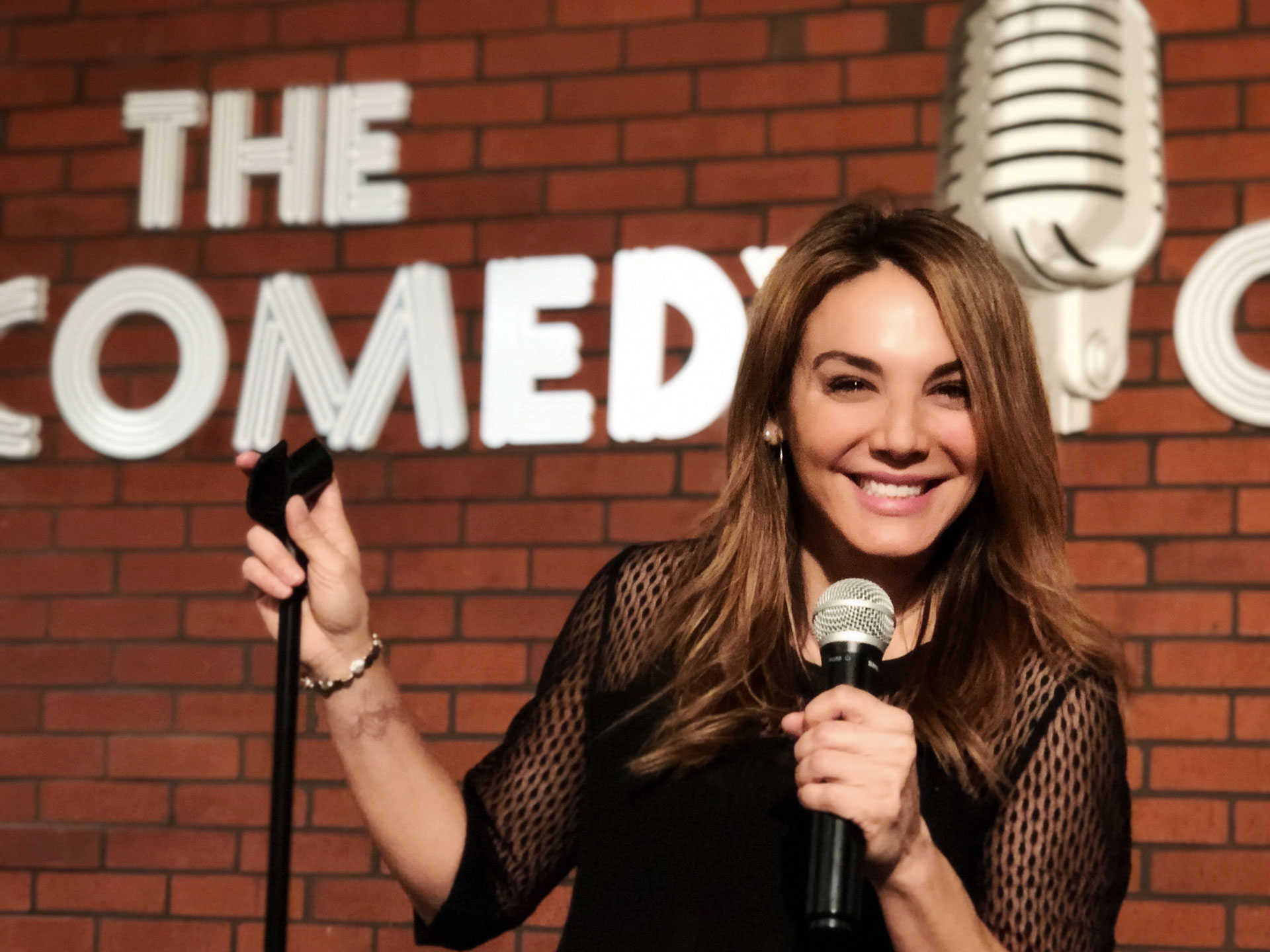
Jill-Michele Meleán at the Comedy Club in Pechanga, in front of a redbrick wall

Comedy clubs advantageously use their space to cater to their audience and create an optimal experience. Where a venue has multiple stages, an "A Room" is typically the largest and best room, used for popular acts, while a "B Room" is for local, lesser-known performers.

== In popular culture ==
Comedy clubs often serve as the venue for stand-up comedy specials, where comedians are filmed at comedy clubs and theaters as they perform. These humorous spaces are also featured heavily in the show Seinfeld, where a staged comedy club serves as a vital place where the lead character, Jerry Seinfeld, performs and socializes.

== Notable clubs ==
=== North America ===
- Comedy Clubs
  - Bananas Comedy Club
  - Cobb's Comedy Club
  - Comedy Bar
  - The Comedy Mothership
  - The Comedy Store
  - The Comic Strip Live
  - Dangerfields
  - Gotham Comedy Club
  - Governors Comedy Club
  - The Laff Stop
  - Mark Ridley's Comedy Castle
  - The Punchline
- Comedy Club Chains
  - Catch a Rising Star
  - Coconuts Comedy Club
  - The Funny Bone
  - The Improv
  - The Laugh Factory
  - The Stress Factory
  - Yuk Yuk's
- Improv groups
  - ComedySportz
  - Dad's Garage Theatre Company
  - The Groundlings
  - iO Theater
  - The Second City
  - Upright Citizens Brigade Theatre

=== Europe ===
- Comedy T.V Show
  - Comedy Club Russia
  - The Stand Comedy Club in Glasgow, Edinburgh and Newcastle upon Tyne
- Comedy Clubs
  - The Comedy Store (London)
  - The Empire in Belfast
- Comedy Club Chains
  - The Glee Club
  - Jongleurs

=== Asia ===
- Comedy Clubs
  - Off the Wall Comedy Empire, Jerusalem, Israel
  - The TakeOut Comedy Club Hong Kong

== See also ==
- Improvisational theatre
- Stand-up comedy
- Comedy festival
