= The Punchline =

Comedy club in Sandy Springs, Georgia, U.S.

Coordinates: 33.9232°N 84.3781°W

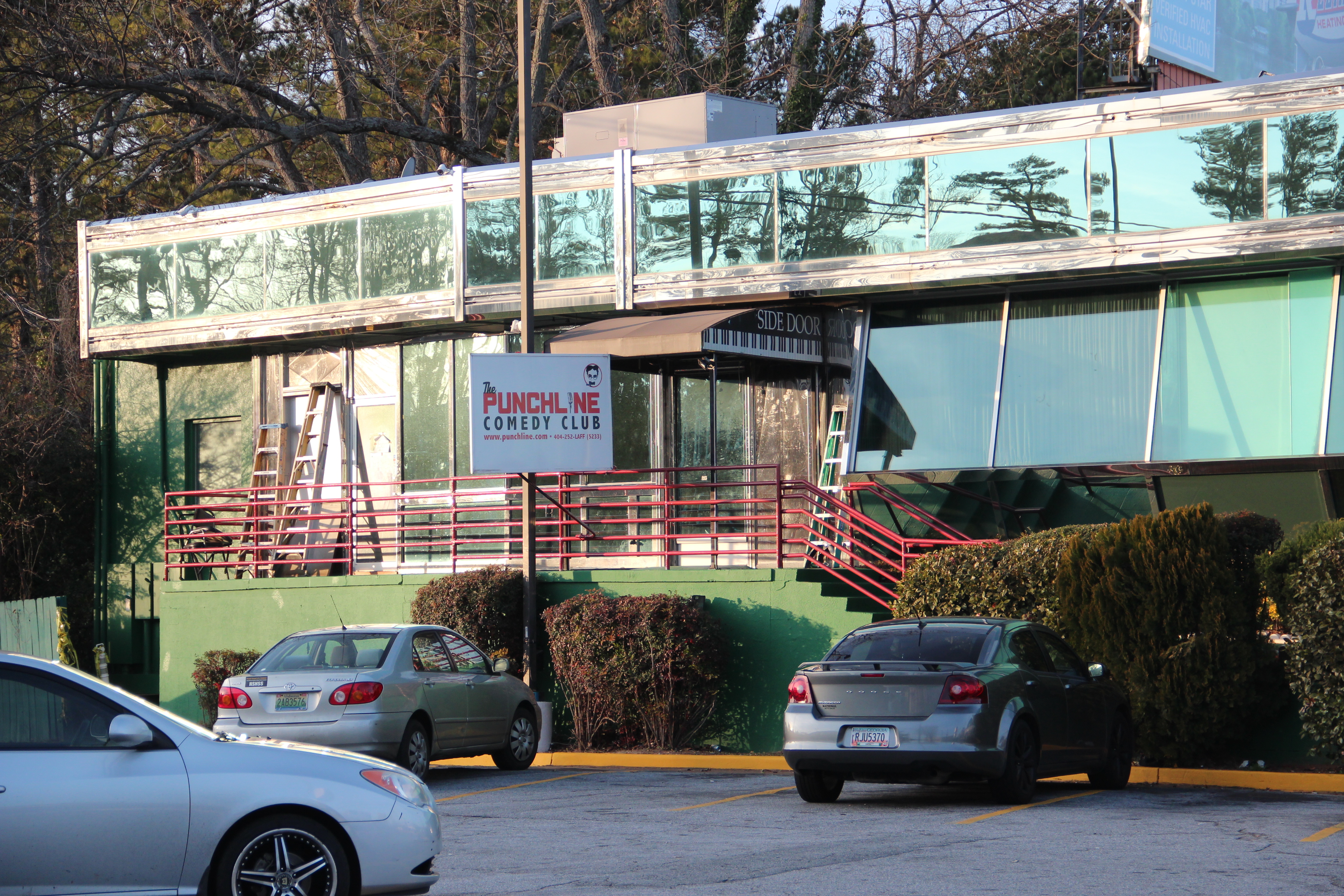
The Punchline Comedy Club in 2017

The Punchline is a comedy club first opened in 1982 in Sandy Springs, Georgia now located in Atlanta, Georgia.

The venue seats 270 people and presents shows five or more nights per week. The club has hosted comedians as diverse as Robin Williams, Eddie Murphy, Dane Cook, and was the original performance venue of Jeff Foxworthy.

The clubhouse originally housed a carpet barn, and at one time was a country and western bar. The decor of the country and western bar is still evident in the club today. Ron DiNunzio and Dave Montesano were the original owners of the business. Today comedian manager Chris DiPetta, and Atlanta attorney Jamie Bendall are the owners of the comedy club. It closed down from its original location in Sandy Springs Ga. in March 2015. There was a hiatus of seven months with no brick and mortar location. It reopened in November 2015, now sharing a building with the Landmark Diner.
