= Budd Friedman =

American actor and comedy club founder (1932–2022)

- Born: Gerson Merton Friedman; June 6, 1932; Norwich, Connecticut, U.S.
- Died: November 12, 2022 (aged 90); Los Angeles, California, U.S.
- Occupation(s): Actor, producer
- Years active: 1971–2022

Gerson Merton Lenord Friedman (June 6, 1932 – November 12, 2022), known professionally as Budd Friedman, was an American actor and comedian, as well as the founder and original proprietor and MC of the Improvisation Comedy Club, which opened in 1963, on West 44th Street near the SE corner of 9th Avenue, in the Hell's Kitchen neighborhood of Manhattan. He was instrumental in launching the comedy careers of Rodney Dangerfield, Richard Lewis, Robert Klein, Jay Leno, Andy Kaufman, Freddie Prinze, Steve Landesberg, Jimmie Walker, and for a brief time, managed Bette Midler at the early stages of her career. It was with Friedman's help and guidance that Ms. Midler first appeared on The Tonight Show.

He was also an actor and producer. Friedman also opened Improv clubs at other locations including Pechanga Resort and Casino in Temecula, California, on March 23, 2007, in Los Angeles in 1975, and in Fantasy Springs Resort and Casino in Indio, California.

== Korean War ==
Friedman served in the infantry in the U.S. Army during the Korean War. He was wounded by an enemy grenade during his first day in action in the summer of 1953 while his unit was assaulting Pork Chop Hill. He was awarded the Purple Heart and the Combat Infantryman Badge (CIB). The ceasefire went into effect while he was still recuperating in the hospital.

== Personal life and death ==
Friedman married his first wife, Silver Saundors, they divorced in 1979.

Friedman married Alix Friedman (née Mark) in 1981, and remained with her for an unconfirmed number of years. They had four children named Zoe, Beth, Ross, and Dax. Friedman died in Los Angeles, on November 12, 2022, at the age of 90, from heart failure.

== Filmography ==
=== Actor ===
- National Lampoon's Funny Money (2003) ... as Announcer
- Man on the Moon (1999) ... as Himself
- Star 80 (1983) ... as Emcee
- An Evening at the Improv (1982) ... as Host

=== Producer ===
- National Lampoon's Funny Money (2003) ... executive producer
- An Evening at the Improv (1982) ... executive producer

== Awards and recognition ==
- Norwich (Connecticut) Native Son Award (1980)
- Golden Goody Award (2013)

== See also ==
- The Improv
