= Bananas Comedy Club =

Coordinates: 41.63875°N 73.91828°W

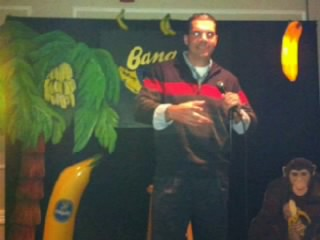
MJ at Bananas Comedy Club

Bananas Comedy Club are two venues for stand-up comedy: the original founded in 1986 in Poughkeepsie, New York and the other opening its doors in 1988 in Hasbrouck Heights, New Jersey. Top comedians in the business have stopped by throughout the years including Jackie Mason, Jerry Seinfeld, Chris Rock, Rita Rudner, Jamie Foxx, Tim Allen, Brian Regan, Jeff Dunham, Sinbad, Caroline Rhea, Pat Cooper, Paul Reiser, Tommy Davidson, Rich Vos, John Pinette, Jim Breuer, Robert Klein, Patrice O'Neal, Bobcat Goldthwait, and many more. Both the Poughkeepsie and Hasbrouck Heights locations have closed, though another has opened in Rutherford, NJ. Kyle Barnet and Brandon Michael hosted their weekly show "Another Day, Another Set" from 2007–2010.

Jimmy Fallon first stepped on a comedy stage at Bananas in Poughkeepsie. His mother had told him about an impression contest, so Fallon came up with a routine about a commercial for troll dolls. He ended up winning the contest and after college he began touring the country.
