= Coconuts Comedy Club =

International comedy venue chain

Coconuts Comedy Club is a chain of comedy clubs. They first opened in St. Pete Beach, FL in May 1986. Since then many more locations have opened up in Florida and throughout the rest of the country. They also have clubs in parts of the Caribbean and Europe.

== Locations ==
- St. Petersburg, Florida
- Cape Coral, Florida
- Clearwater, Florida
- Clearwater Beach, Florida
- Safety Harbor, Florida
- New Port Richey, Florida
- Tampa, Florida
- Brandon, Florida
- Lakeland, Florida
- Gainesville, Florida
- Boca Raton, Florida
- Pensacola, Florida
- Fort Myers, Florida

Outside Florida:

- Nashville, Tennessee
- Newport, Rhode Island
- Niantic, East Lyme, Connecticut
- Hilton Head, South Carolina
- Myrtle Beach, South Carolina
- Chicago, Illinois
- Seven Mile Beach, Grand Cayman
