= The Improv =

Comedy club franchise

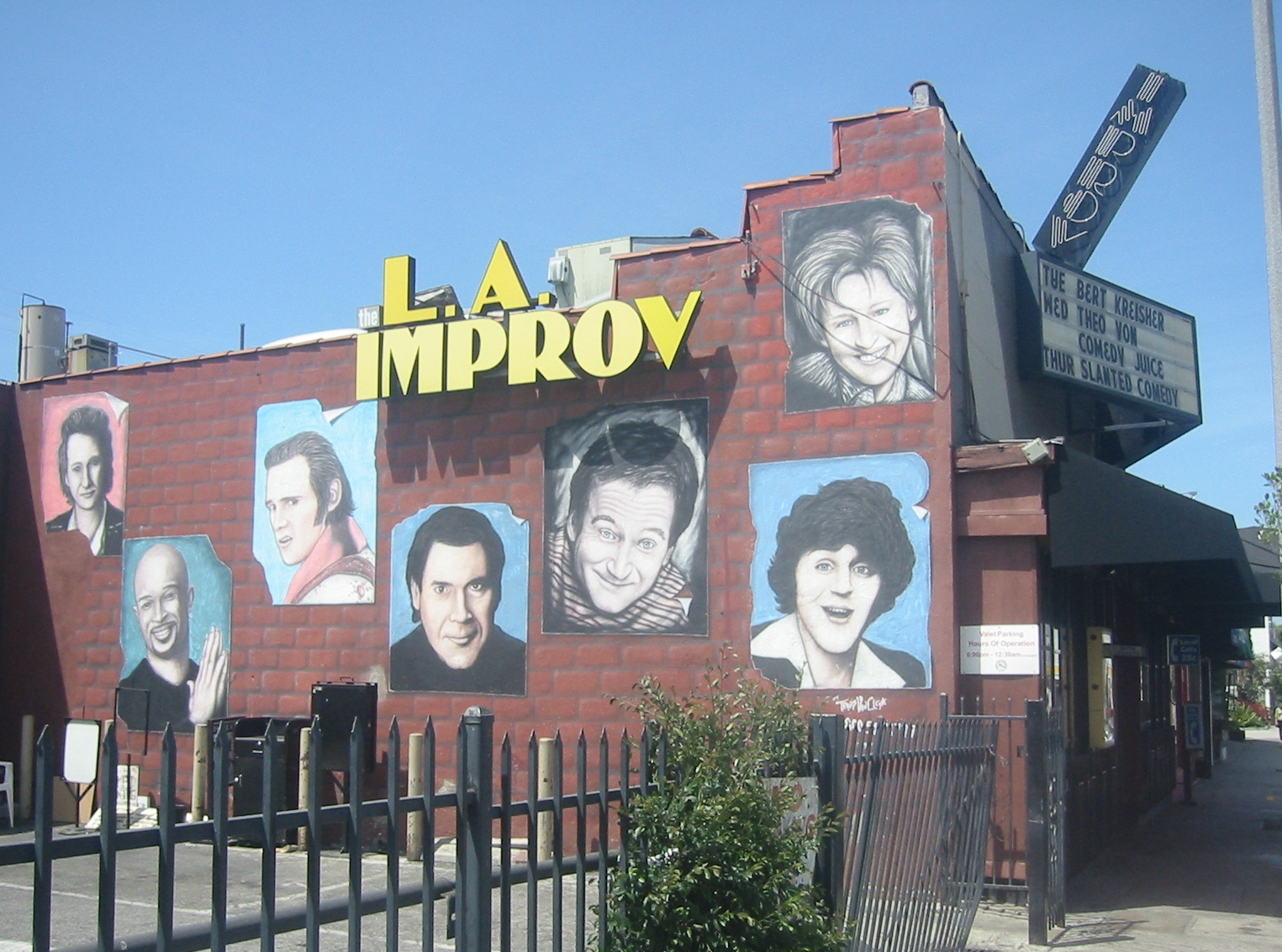
L.A. Improv on Melrose Avenue in Los Angeles

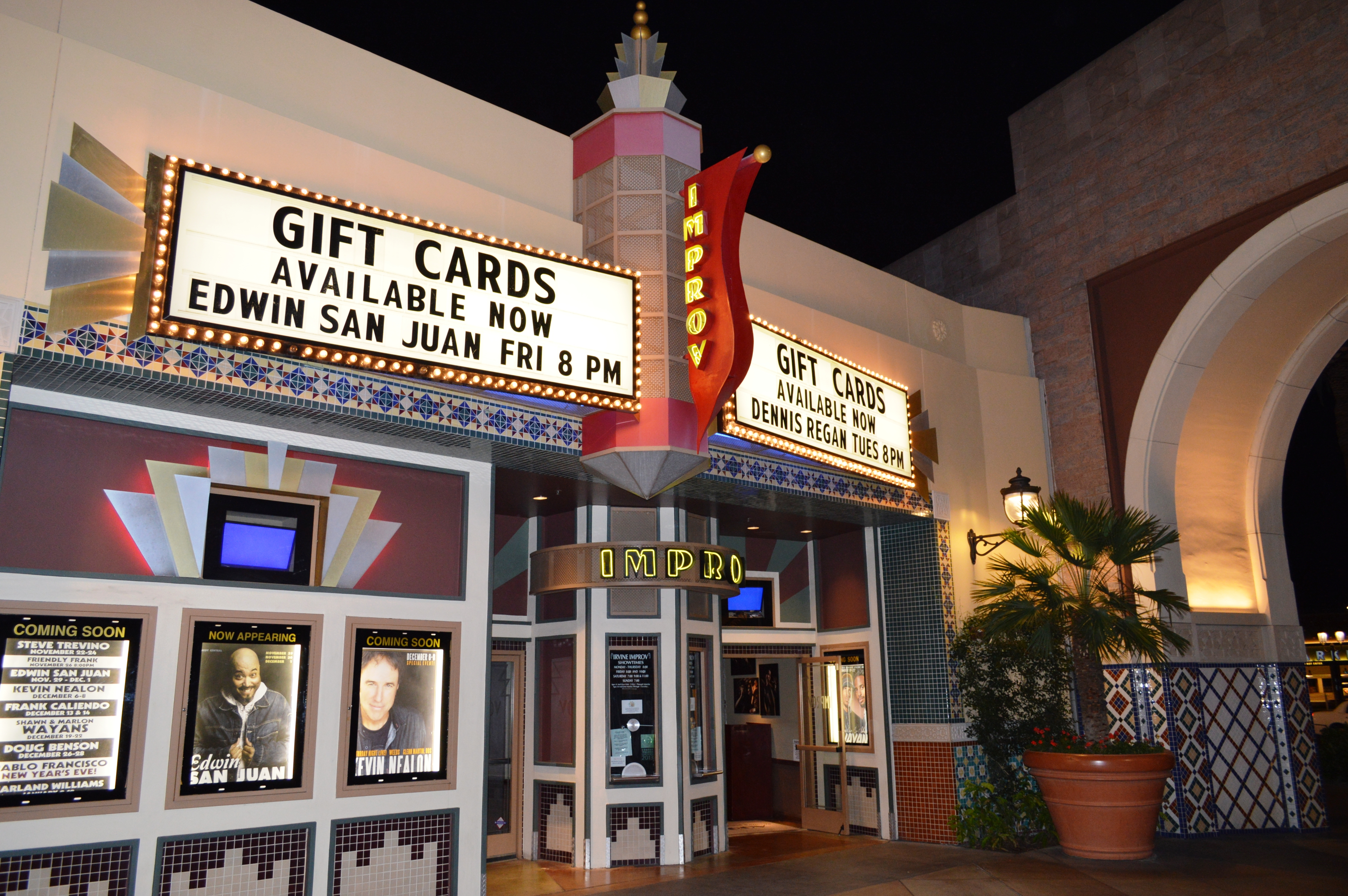
Irvine Improv

The Improv is a comedy club franchise. It was founded as a single venue in the Hell's Kitchen neighborhood of New York City in 1963, and expanded into a chain of venues in the late 1970s.

== History ==
Originally, it was a 50-seat single venue (which immediately prior, housed a Vietnamese restaurant) founded on 20 April 1963, by Budd Friedman and his future wife, Silver (née Schreck) Saundors, and located at 358 West 44th Street, at Ninth Avenue, in the Hell's Kitchen neighborhood of New York City near the southeast corner of 9th Ave. The Improvisation was originally an after hours coffee house where Broadway performers could unwind after shows with an open mic inviting impromptu musical performances. In 1964, Dave Astor was its first comedian. Gradually comedians would use it as a venue to try out new material and talent scouts from The Tonight Show Starring Johnny Carson and other New York-based television shows began frequenting the venue looking for new acts to book. After several years of alternating acts between singers and comics, by the 1970s it was a stand-up comedy venue. A second location was opened in 1974 at 8162 Melrose Avenue in the Fairfax District of Los Angeles, California (which immediately prior housed the Ash Grove, a folk music venue). In 1979, Mark Lonow became a general partner and with Budd Friedman ran the Melrose club and oversaw the expansion of the single room as it became a successful chain. When the Friedmans divorced in 1981, the divorce settlement gave Budd Friedman ownership of the LA Improvs and Silver Friedman was given ownership of the New York Improv. The original New York Improv closed in 1992.

In 1982, the L.A. Improv became the original site for the A&E Network television series An Evening at the Improv, running from 1982 until 1996, and was produced by Larry O'Daly, created by O'Daly and Barbara Hosie-O'Daly, with Budd Friedman as a warm-up host. Other locations have opened since then, such as in Tampa, Florida, Fort Lauderdale, Florida, Atlantic City, New Jersey, and Louisville, Kentucky. In 2014, Friedman sold the Improv chain to Levity Entertainment Group, now known as Levity Live.

== Performances ==
The Improv was the place to see Richard Pryor, Robert Klein, Steve Landesberg, Bette Midler, Lily Tomlin, Jay Leno, and others when they were just starting out. Dustin Hoffman played piano there. On any given night in the later 1970s, one could see Gilbert Gottfried, Joe Piscopo, Bruce Mahler, Robin Williams, Larry David, and many others. Often famous comedians would walk in to "work out" before appearances on The Tonight Show. It was not unusual to find celebrities in the audience.

Nearly every big name in comedy has played The Improv, including Richard Belzer, Milton Berle, Kevin Brennan, Drew Carey, George Carlin, Andrew Dice Clay, Bill Cosby, Billy Crystal, Rodney Dangerfield, Jeff Dunham, Bill Engvall, Dave Foley, Jeff Foxworthy, Bill Hicks, Andy Kaufman, Carol Leifer, David Letterman, Richard Lewis, Jon Lovett, Norm Macdonald, Bill Maher, Marc Maron, Steve Martin, Dennis Miller, Larry Miller, Liza Minnelli, Freddie Prinze, Ray Romano, Paul Reiser, Joan Rivers, Joe Rogan, Jerry Seinfeld, Bo Burnham and Ron White. Jeremy Ruder at 18, and Jim Carrey at 19.

Silver Friedman auditioned and rejected Eddie Murphy, a regular at The Comic Strip in New York City, for being "too vulgar," and he eventually performed at the Improv in Los Angeles when he was only 15 years old.

Karen Black, Debra Winger and Barry Manilow, among others, worked there as waiters, waitresses, hosts or musicians before becoming famous.

New and upcoming performers have performed there as well. Comedy Central's Dave Attell frequents Improv locations in Tampa and Hollywood. Comics Lewis Black, Mike Birbiglia, Louis C.K. and Jimmy Fallon have performed at the Improv in Louisville, Kentucky.

== Locations ==
The following is a list of Improv locations as of May 2020:

- Addison, Texas (Dallas area)
- Arlington, Texas
- Brea, California
- Brookfield, Wisconsin (Milwaukee area)
- Cleveland, Ohio
- Denver, Colorado
- Fort Lauderdale, Florida
- Hollywood, California
- Houston, Texas
- Irvine, California
- Kansas City, Missouri
- Miami, Florida
- West Nyack, New York
- Brooklyn, New York
- Ontario, California
- Orlando, Florida
- Oxnard, California
- West Palm Beach, Florida
- Pittsburgh, Pennsylvania
- Raleigh, North Carolina
- San Jose, California
- Schaumburg, Illinois (Chicago area)
- Stateline, Nevada (south shore of Lake Tahoe)
- Tampa, Florida
- Tempe, Arizona
- Washington, D.C.

The following is a list of former Improv locations:

- Atlanta, Georgia
- Atlantic City, New Jersey
- Baltimore, Maryland
- Las Vegas, Nevada
- Louisville, Kentucky
- New York City, New York
- Reno, Nevada
- San Diego, California
- San Francisco, California
- Seattle, Washington
- London, England

== See also ==
- List of New York Improv comedians
- Traffic School by Improv
