= List of Brendan Fraser performances =

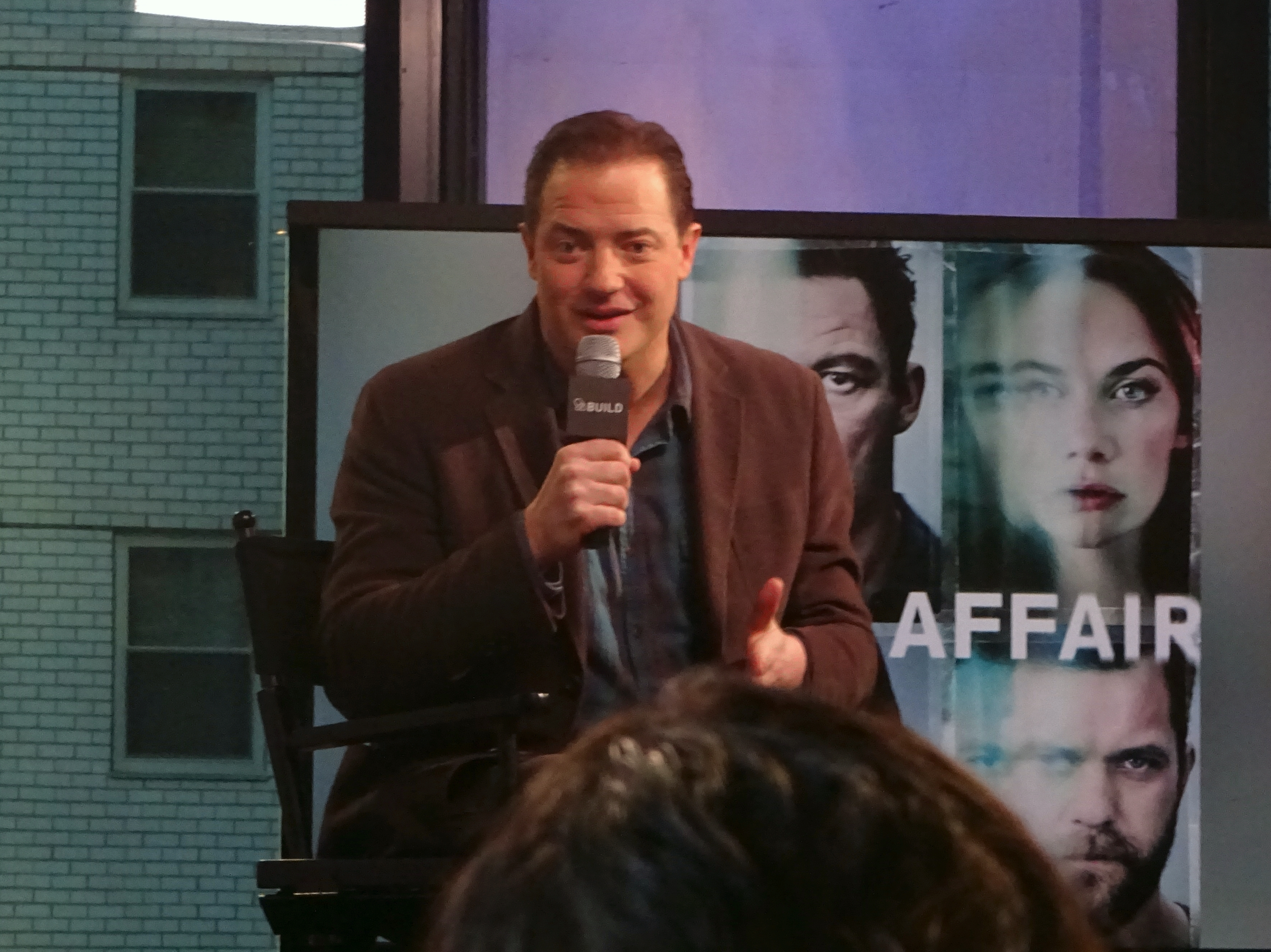
Fraser in 2016, being interviewed for The Affair

American-Canadian actor Brendan Fraser had his film debut in the 1991 period coming-of-age drama film Dogfight. He went on to star in numerous films including the comedy film Encino Man (1992), drama film School Ties (1992), comedy-drama film With Honors (1994), comedy film Airheads (1994), psychological horror drama The Passion of Darkly Noon (1995), comedy film George of the Jungle (1997), drama film Still Breathing (1997), period drama Gods and Monsters (1998), slapstick comedy Dudley Do-Right (1999), and romantic comedy-drama fantasy Blast from the Past (1999). Also in 1999, he starred as Rick O'Connell in the action-adventure film The Mummy opposite Rachel Weisz. He reprised the role in the 2001 sequel The Mummy Returns and in the third and final installment in The Mummy trilogy, The Mummy: Tomb of the Dragon Emperor (2008).

During the 2000s, Fraser starred in a wide array of genres, including the fantasy romantic comedy film Bedazzled (2000), black comedy fantasy film Monkeybone (2001), romantic drama thriller film The Quiet American (2002), live-action/animated comedy film Looney Tunes: Back in Action (2003), crime drama film Crash (2004), independent crime thriller film Journey to the End of the Night (2006), science fantasy action-adventure film Journey to the Center of the Earth (2008), fantasy adventure film Inkheart (2008) and family black comedy film Furry Vengeance (2010). He's also starred in the medical drama film Extraordinary Measures (2010), neo-noir period crime thriller No Sudden Move (2021), and Darren Aronofsky's psychological drama film The Whale (2022). For his role in The Whale, he won the Academy Award for Best Actor, the first Canadian actor to do so.

Fraser's television work includes the miniseries Texas Rising (2015), the Showtime drama series The Affair (2016–2017), the FX anthology series Trust (2018), the Epix series Condor (2018), and the Max action series Doom Patrol (2019–2023). Fraser's stage credits include Cat on a Hot Tin Roof and Elling.

== Film ==
List of Brendan Fraser film credits
Year	Title	Role	Notes	Ref.
1991	Dogfight	Sailor No. 1	As "Brendon Fraser"	
1992	Encino Man	Linkavitch "Link" Chomofsky		
1992	School Ties	David Greene		
1993	Twenty Bucks	Sam Mastrewski		
1993	Son in Law	Linkovich "Link" Chomofsky	Uncredited cameo	
1993	Younger and Younger	Winston Younger		
1994	With Honors	Monty Kessler		
1994	Airheads	Chester "Chazz Darby" Ogilvie		
1994	In the Army Now	"Link" Chomofsky	Uncredited cameo	
1994	The Scout	Steve Nebraska		
1995	The Passion of Darkly Noon	Darkly Noon		
1995	Now and Then	Vietnam Veteran	Uncredited cameo	
1996	Kids in the Hall: Brain Candy	Placebo Patient	Uncredited cameo	
1996	Mrs. Winterbourne	Bill Winterbourne / Hugh Winterbourne		
1996	Glory Daze	Doug	Cameo	
1997	The Twilight of the Golds	David Gold		
1997	George of the Jungle	George		
1998	Still Breathing	Fletcher McBracken		
1998	Gods and Monsters	Clayton Boone		
1999	Blast from the Past	Adam Webber		
1999	The Mummy	Rick O'Connell		
1999	Dudley Do-Right	Dudley Do-Right		
2000	Bedazzled	Elliot Richards / Abraham Lincoln		
2000	Sinbad: Beyond the Veil of Mists	Sinbad	Voice role	
2001	Monkeybone	Stuart "Stu" Miley / Stanley	Also uncredited and voice roles for Stanley and Monkeybone, respectively	
2001	The Mummy Returns	Rick O'Connell	Highest-grossing film	
2002	The Quiet American	Alden Pyle		
2003	Dickie Roberts: Former Child Star	Himself	Uncredited cameo	
2003	Looney Tunes: Back in Action	DJ Drake / Himself	Also voice role for Tasmanian Devil and She-Devil	
2004	Crash	District Attorney Rick Cabot		
2006	Journey to the End of the Night	Paul		
2006	The Last Time	Jamie Bashant	Also executive producer	
2007	The Air I Breathe	Pleasure		
2007	Big Bug Man	Howard Kind / Big Bug Man	Voice role; Unreleased	
2008	Journey to the Center of the Earth	Professor Trevor Anderson	Also executive producer	
2008	The Mummy: Tomb of the Dragon Emperor	Rick O'Connell		
2008	Inkheart	Mortimer Folchart		
2009	G.I. Joe: The Rise of Cobra	Sgt. Geoffrey Stone IV	Uncredited cameo	
2010	Extraordinary Measures	John Crowley		
2010	Furry Vengeance	Dan Sanders	Also executive producer	
2012	Whole Lotta Sole	Joe Maguire	Also executive producer	
2013	Escape from Planet Earth	Scorch Supernova	Voice role	
2013	A Case of You	Tony		
2013	Hair Brained	Leo Searly		
2013	Pawn Shop Chronicles	Ricky Baldoski		
2013	Breakout	Jack Damson	Direct-to-video; also producer	
2013	Gimme Shelter	Tom Fitzpatrick		
2014	The Nut Job	Grayson	Voice role	
2019	The Poison Rose	Miles Mitchell		
2019	Line of Descent	Charlie "Charu" Jolpin		
2020	The Secret of Karma	Animus / Ronay		
2021	No Sudden Move	Doug Jones		
2022	Dimensions	Animus / Ronay	Alternate version of The Secret of Karma	
2022	Batgirl	Ted Carson / Firefly	Unreleased	
2022	The Whale	Charlie	Won the Academy Award for Best Actor in a Leading Role	
2023	Killers of the Flower Moon	W. S. Hamilton		
2024	Brothers	Jimmy Farful		
2025	Sea Lions of the Galapagos	Narrator	Documentary film	
2025	Rental Family	Phillip Vanderploeg		
2026	Diamond	'Danny Boy' McVicar		
2026	Pressure	Dwight D. Eisenhower		
2027	The Mummy: Book of the Dead	Rick O'Connell	Filming; Also executive producer	
TBA	Starman	Tom Adams	Post-production	

Key
†	Denotes films that have not yet been released

== Television ==
List of Brendan Fraser television credits
Year	Title	Role	Notes	Ref.
1991	My Old School	Chevy	Short film	
1991	Child of Darkness, Child of Light	John's friend	Television film	
1991	Guilty Until Proven Innocent	Bobby McLaughlin	Television film	
1995	Fallen Angels	Johnny Lamb	Episode: "The Professional Man"	
1997	Duckman	Sammons Cagle	Voice role; episode: "Dammit, Hollywood"	
1997, 1999	Saturday Night Live	Himself	Host; 2 episodes	
1998	The Simpsons	Brad	Voice role; episode: "King of the Hill"	
2000, 2005	King of the Hill	David Kalaiki-Ali / Irv Bennet / Jimmy Beardon	Voice role; 2 episodes	
2002, 2004	Scrubs	Ben Sullivan	3 episodes	
2009	Wishology!	Turbo Thunder	Voice role; television films	
2015	Texas Rising	Billy Anderson	Miniseries; 5 episodes	
2016–2017	The Affair	John Gunther	6 episodes	
2017	Nightcap	Himself	Episode: "Poop Show"	
2018	Trust	James Fletcher Chase	8 episodes	
2018	Condor	Nathan Fowler	7 episodes	
2018, 2023	Titans	Clifford "Cliff" Steele / Robotman	Voice role; 2 episodes	
2019–2023	Doom Patrol	Clifford "Cliff" Steele / Robotman	Main role; 46 episodes	
2020	Professionals	Peter Swann	Main role; 10 episodes; also executive producer	
2026	Breaking Bear	Jer	Voice role; 2 episodes	

== Stage ==
Year	Title	Role	Venue	Notes	Ref.
1995	Four Dogs and a Bone	Victor	Geffen Playhouse		
2001	Cat on a Hot Tin Roof	Brick	Lyric Theatre	West End	
2010	Elling	Kjell	Ethel Barrymore Theatre	Broadway	

== Video game ==
List of Brendan Fraser video game credits
Year	Title	Voice role	Ref.
2008	The Mummy: Tomb of the Dragon Emperor – The Video Game	Rick O'Connell	

== See also ==
- List of awards and nominations received by Brendan Fraser
