= Encino Woman =

1996 film by Shawn Schepps

- Official release poster
- Directed by: Shawn Schepps
- Screenplay by: Anne Joseph; Shawn Schepps
- Produced by: Jeffrey Lampert; Irwin Marcus
- Starring: Jay Thomas; Corey Parker; Rick Overton; John Kassir; Annabelle Gurwitch; Joel Murray; Clarence Williams III; Katherine Kousi
- Cinematography: Russ T. Alsobrook
- Edited by: Duane Hartzell
- Music by: David Lawrence
- Distributed by: ABC
- Release date: April 20, 1996
- Running time: 91 minutes
- Country: United States
- Language: English

Encino Woman (also known as California Woman) is a 1996 TV movie directed by Shawn Schepps. It tells the story of Lucy, a cavewoman who awakes in 1990s Los Angeles and inadvertently becomes both a successful fashion model and a spokesperson for feminism. The film is a sequel to 1992's Encino Man, though none of the original cast reprise their roles. Numerous drag queens make cameos, including Jackie Beat and The Fabulous Wonder Twins.

The film aired only once, on the ABC network in the evening of April 20, 1996. Encino Woman has never been released on home video or streaming services since.

== Plot ==
In 1990s Los Angeles, a cryogenically frozen prehistoric woman is awakened by an earthquake. Meanwhile, David Hosenfelt works as an advertising executive and lives with his housemate Chris, a kindergarten teacher. David is struggling at work with a difficult client, a perfume brand named Primal, led by an eccentric French man named Jean Michel. When David asks for a promotion, he is impulsively fired by his aggressive boss Marvin Reckler. He is advised by his colleague Roger to attend the following day's photo shoot, as Marvin will likely have cooled off by then.

While roaming the streets of Los Angeles, the prehistoric woman meets David. She barges into his house, threatening his cat with a spear and eating the food in his kitchen before seducing him, and they become friends. During the photo shoot, model Ivana proves difficult to work with. The prehistoric woman arrives on set and impresses Jean Michel, leading to her becoming the brand's new spokeswoman and David being rehired. David spontaneously names the woman Lucy and lies that she is a "travelling performance artist." Ivana is unhappy that she has been replaced and promises to keep her eye on Lucy.

Lucy officially moves in with David and Chris and is given a makeover to pass as a modern woman. Dropping her off at Chris' kindergarten for the day, David begins making calls to the local police to see if Lucy is a missing person. Making some observations and enquiries of her own, Chris begins to suspect Lucy is from prehistoric times and learns the story of Link Chomovsky. Lucy and Chris begin bonding and Chris teaches her the words "yes" and "hungry."

Marvin summons Lucy to a meeting and asks to speak to her alone. Because she only knows two words, she responds "yes" when Marvin asks her if she planned to attract Jean Michel's attention as a stunt and "hungry" when he asks where she is from, which he mishears as "Hungary." This also leads to a jealous Ivana reporting Lucy to the police, suspecting her to be an illegal immigrant. Meanwhile, she attends an English class with a group of actual immigrants led by a politically radical teacher named Javier. While handing out candy to the class, he teaches her to say "revolution", "be free" and "home."

Lucy arrives at the shoot and reacts negatively to being pressured to perform, throwing a tantrum as photos are taken and smashing the mirror in the green room. Chris increasingly develops a respect for Lucy, believing she is "just who she is" and encourages David to teach her anthropology. Despite her initial discomfort, Lucy becomes a successful and famous model and David rises in status as a member of her entourage - though he begins to feel Jean Michel does not fully appreciate or understand her. At a party of trendy models, Lucy encourages the guests to binge on candy and says "revolution" and "be free."

David shows Lucy some illustrations of prehistoric times from a history textbook, to which she responds emotionally with "home" and "be free." He tries to communicate that this era is long gone, and she slaps him. Lucy moves in with new friends from the fashion world, and David loses his job again after calling Jean Michel an "untalented piranha." Reflecting on his life, David realizes that he is in love with Lucy and has taken her for granted. He plans to get her back at the official Primal launch party, which features a runway fashion show.

Lucy is booked on a TV talk show, having inadvertently become a spokesperson for women's rights and a critic of diet culture. She responds to questions with "yes", "revolution", "hungry" and "be free" and is well received by hosts Brenda and Bobby and the audience, developing a feminist following who begin rejecting the fashion industry in her name. At the Primal launch party, enraged at her treatment, Lucy screams and rips off her outfit while on the catwalk then assaults Jean Michel and Marvin. The audience rapturously applauds, believing it part of the act and booing when security attempt to detain her. Wearing a loincloth, David swings in on a rope and rescues Lucy and she tells him she loves him. Police then attempt to arrest her, still believing her to be a Hungarian illegal immigrant. The situation is averted when her and David decide to marry and spend the rest of their lives together.

== Cast ==
- Jay Thomas as Marvin Reckler
- Corey Parker as David Hosenfelt
- Rick Overton as Raji
- John Kassir as Jean Michel
- Annabelle Gurwitch as Chris
- Joel Murray as Mr. Jones
- Clarence Williams III as Javier
- Katherine Kousi as Lucy
- Chris Hogan as Roger
- Elisa Donovan as Ivana
- Suli McCullough as Marcus
- Marissa Ribisi as Fiona
- Jeffrey Ross as Mr. Smith
- Bobcat Goldthwait as Yogi Paxil
- Shawn Schepps as Brenda
- Spencer Garrett as Bobby
- Jackie Beat as Doorman
- The Fabulous Wonder Twins as VIPs

== Critical reception ==
In Variety, Sue Cummings compared Encino Woman to Paris is Burning due to the lengthy fashion show sequences and proliferation of queer characters. However, she was critical of the film and called it "a progression of hammed scenes that are too choppy and varied in tone." Mike Hughes of the San Bernardino County Sun called the film "a low point in television" but was complimentary of Kaherine Kousi's performance. Mike Duffy wrote in The Oregonian that "despite the film's colourful, hyperactive attempts at social satire, Encino Woman wears out its welcome in rapid fashion" and added that it had made him "wistful for Pauly Shore."
