= Jeff Kahn =

Jeff Kahn may refer to:

- Jeff Kahn (mathematician), professor of mathematics at Rutgers University
- Jeff Kahn (writer), American writer and actor

== See also ==
- Geoffrey Khan (born 1958), British linguist
