= Pauly Shore Stands Alone =

- Film poster
- Directed by: Pauly Shore
- Produced by: Peter Clune; Joey Vigour
- Starring: Pauly Shore
- Cinematography: Jake Bianco
- Edited by: Troy Takaki; Joey Vigour
- Music by: Brian H. Kim
- Distributed by: Showtime
- Release dates: October 17, 2014 (Woodstock Film Festival); December 4, 2014
- Running time: 87 minutes
- Country: United States
- Language: English

Pauly Shore Stands Alone is a 2014 American documentary film directed by Pauly Shore. It premiered at the 2014 Woodstock Film Festival and was later released on Showtime in December 2014. The film follows Shore on a cold midwestern stand-up comedy tour of small venues in Wisconsin and Minnesota as he interacts with fans and deals with health issues and the realities of mortality.

== Synopsis ==
The documentary opens with a brief clip from Shore's 1993 HBO special Pauly Does Dallas, followed by a title card reading "22 years later." Pauly, now age 45, prepares for his standup comedy tour and speaks about his life and about his ailing mother, Mitzi Shore. Pauly then leaves on his trip for Wisconsin and Minnesota and meets several colorful characters along the way.

It is an unscripted and true-life documentary, notably different in tone and style from Shore's previous films Adopted or Pauly Shore is Dead, which are in the mockumentary style.

== Reception ==
The documentary won Best Documentary at the Downtown Los Angeles Film Festival and the editing by Troy Takaki and Joey Vigour was nominated for an Eddie Award for Best Television Documentary in January 2015.
