= Annabelle Gurwitch =

American actress

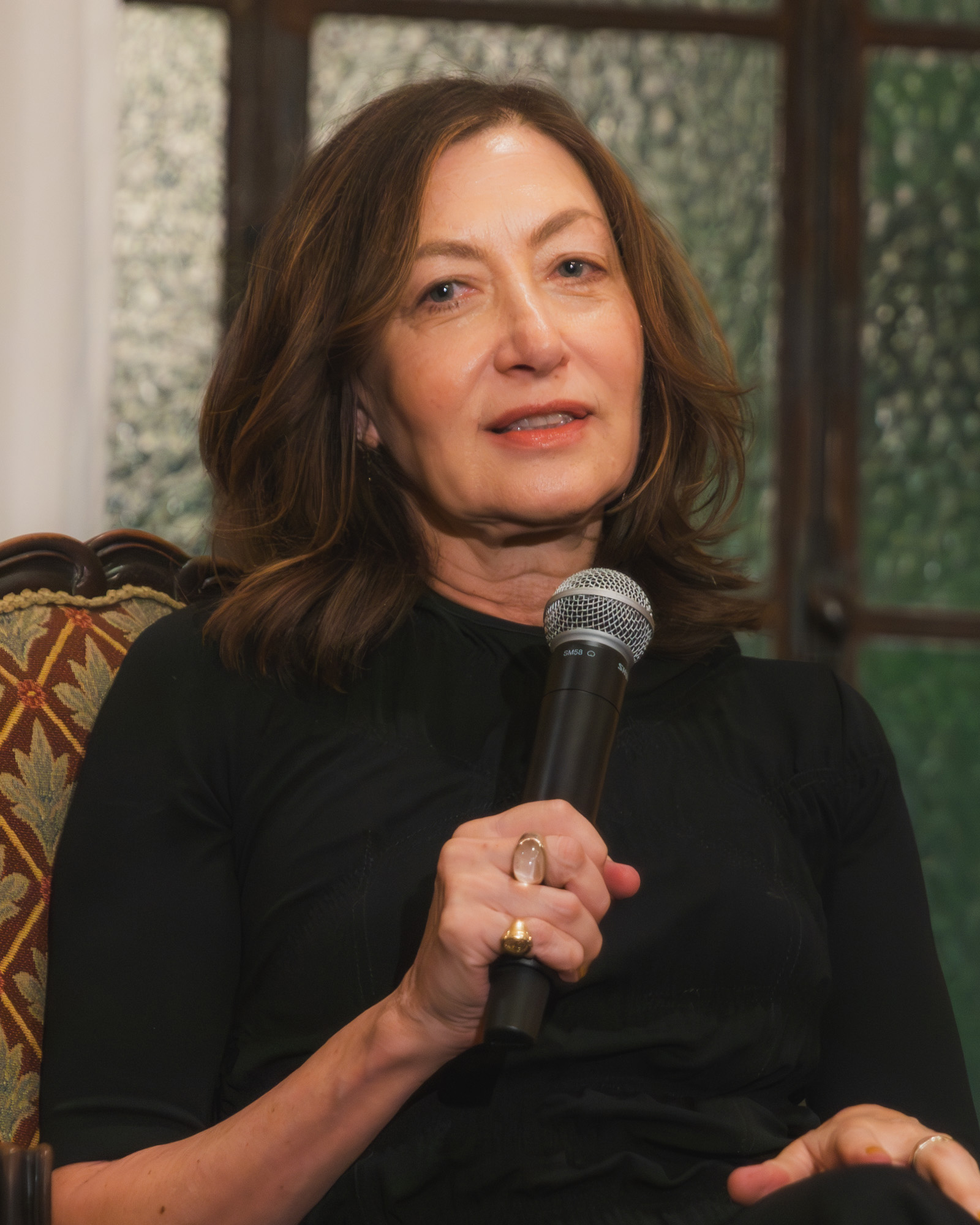
- Gurwitch in 2026
- Born: 1961 or 1962 (age 64–65); Alabama
- Occupations: Actress; author; columnist; comedian
- Years active: 1984–present
- Spouse: Jeff Kahn (1996–2021)
- Children: 1

Annabelle Gurwitch is an American author, actress and television host most recognizable from her stint as a hostess on Dinner and a Movie on TBS, and an activist associated with environmental issues and secular humanism. She was recognized as one of the 100 Influential Women in Oncology by OncoDaily.

== Early life ==
Gurwitch was born in Alabama to a Jewish family. She was raised in Mobile until the age of five before moving temporarily to Delaware and then to Florida where her father found work. She is a 1980 graduate of Miami Beach Senior High School.

== Career ==
=== Theatre ===
Gurwitch began working as an actress Off-Broadway in New York City, including productions with Theater for a Young Audience at Henry Street Settlement, The Public Theater, the 20th Anniversary production of Uncommon Women and Others at Lucille Lortel.

Gurwitch's theater credits include the world premiere of Donald Margulies' A Coney Island Christmas at the Geffen Playhouse, the West Coast Premiere of Go Back to Where You Are by David Greenspan at the Odyssey, the West Coast premier of Women in Jeopardy at EST Santa Barbara, productions with LA Theaterworks including Sixteen Wounded with Omar Metwally, Our Lady of 121 Street opposite Laurence Fishburne, and Adam's Rib with Adam Arkin.

Her performance off-Broadway at the Joe Quintero Theater, in the title role of Murray Mednick's Joe and Betty, garnered her a place in The New York Times' "Top Ten Performances in Theatre of the Year 2002." She also appeared in the Los Angeles Times "Top Ten Performances of the Year in Theatre 2001."

She developed her solo show based on I See You Made an Effort in workshops at the All for One Solo Fest, NY and Skylight Theater, Los Angeles, in 2017. It was featured in the subscription offerings at The Scottsdale Center of Performing Arts and The Temple Theater, at The Des Moines Performing Arts Center, amongst other touring locations. Her live appearances include The Moth, Joe's Pub, House of Speakeasy, New York Comedy Festival, and the Thurber Spring Lecture Series.

=== Television ===
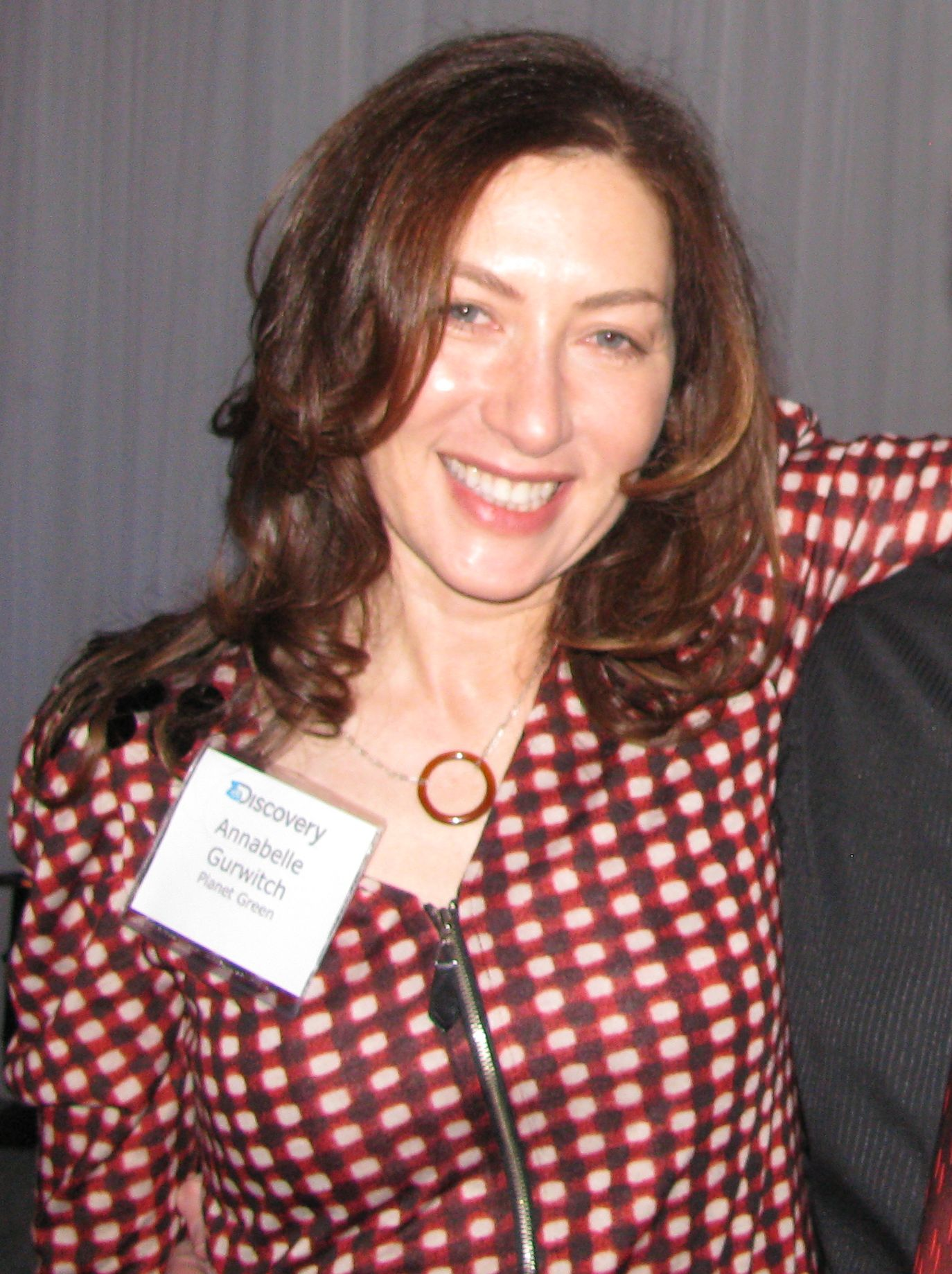
Gurwitch at a Planet Green party

Gurwitch's early television appearances included Not Necessarily the News (1985–1990), and the role of Gina Daniels in several episodes of the soap opera The Guiding Light (1986). Gurwitch plays a call-girl, Suzanne on The Equalizer in the 1988 episode "Video Games", a Red Cross volunteer, Donna on China Beach in "Lost and Found" (1988), and Doctor Marissa Meyers on Alien Nation in "Contact" (1989).

Gurwitch co-wrote two episodes of the 1980s children's animated series ThunderCats.

In 1996, she appeared in Encino Woman, a television film sequel to 1992's Encino Man.

Gurwitch and Paul Gilmartin were the original hosts of the TBS show Dinner and a Movie, which combined cooking instruction with the viewing of a feature film. Gurwitch served as co-host for six years from 1996 to 2002.

In 2002 Gurwitch appeared as the host of Meow TV, along with her cat Stinky, a show distributed on CD inside bags of Meow Mix. Meow TV presented itself as "Television By Cats, For Cats."

Other television hosting work included Syfy's The Dream Team with Annabelle and Michael (2003), VH1's Best Of..., series, Style Network's You're Invited, and Dot Comedy (2000). She was the host of Wa$ted! on Planet Green for three seasons (2008–2010).

Gurwitch made guest appearances on television series such as Miami Vice (1988), Seinfeld (1996), Boston Legal (2006), State of Mind (2007), The Minor Accomplishments of Jackie Woodman (2007), Medium (2008), The Cleaner (2009), Dexter (2010) and Real Time with Bill Maher (2026).

=== Film ===
In 2007 Gurwitch wrote, produced, directed, and appeared in the documentary film Fired! It documents the experiences of twenty-five people, including Gurwitch, who were fired from various jobs. They recount their firings through interviews, skits, comedy routines, and filmed excerpts from the previously produced stage play of the same title. David Cross, Jeff Garlin, Bob Odenkirk and Anne Meara were all featured in addition to UAW workers, former US Secretary of Labor Bob Reich, economist Ben Stein and many other job seekers. The film was played at the US Department of Labor and labor film festivals around the country, including the DC Labor FilmFest.

Gurwitch's other films include Pizza Man (1991), Melvin Goes to Dinner (2003), and The Shaggy Dog (2006).

=== Literary work ===
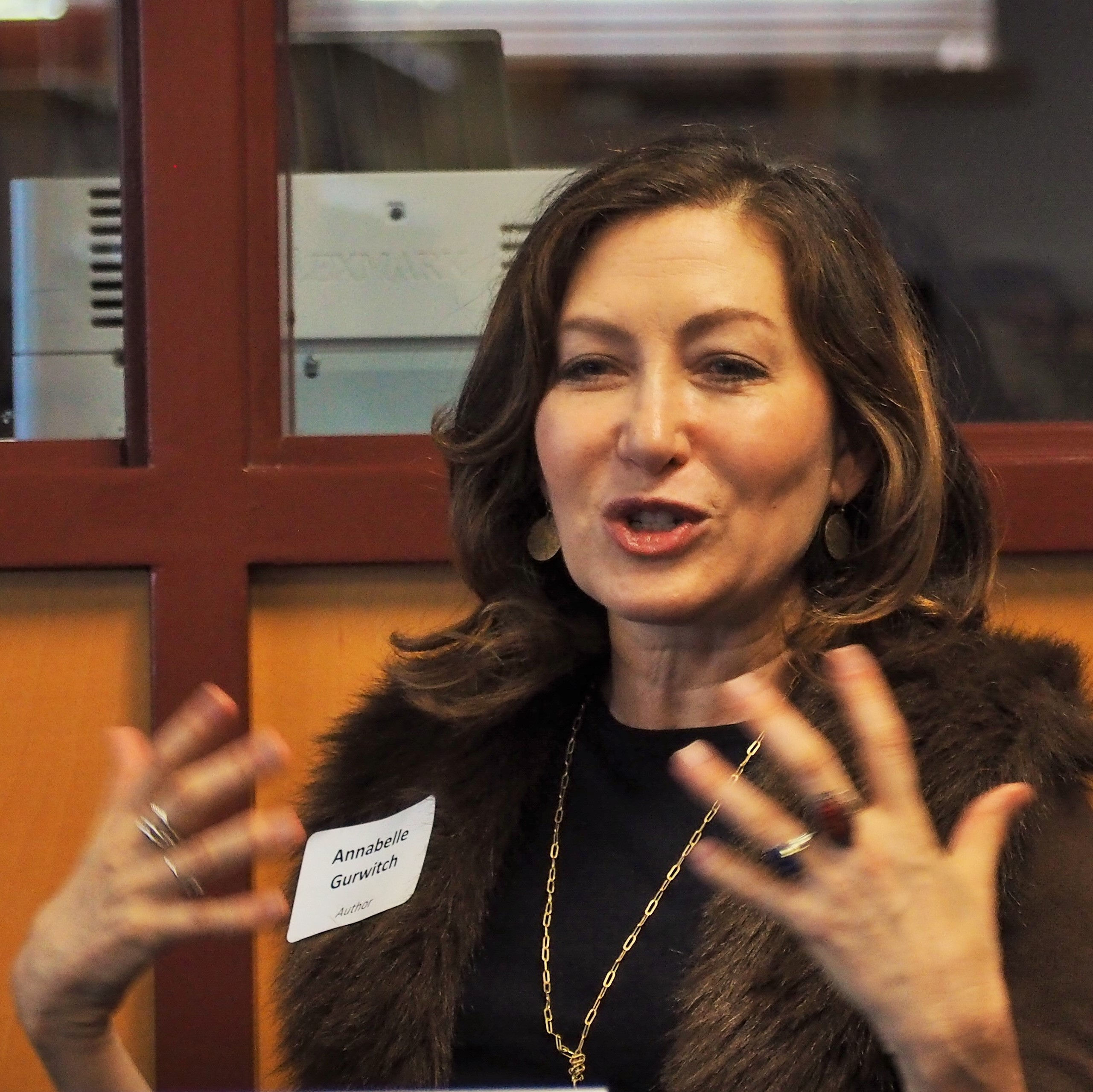
Gurwitch at the Annapolis Book Festival in 2018

She is the author of six books. The latest, The End of My Life is Killing Me, was published in 2026 and details both poignant and humorous dealings with a stage 4 lung cancer diagnosis.

"You're Leaving When?" was published in March 2021.The book comically details her awkward and chaotic encounters with an eccentric French boarder. These encounters came after her decision to start renting bedrooms in her house to boarders to avoid having to sell it after her divorce.

In April 2017, Gurwitch published Wherever You Go, There They Are: Stories About My Family You Might Relate To.

I See You Made an Effort, published in 2014, was a New York Times bestseller and Thurber Prize for American Humor Writing finalist. The year Gurwitch was a finalist for the Thurber Prize marked the first time the three finalists were all female. Gurwitch adapted this book as a solo show, first produced at the Skylight Theater and then toured nationally in 2017. Included in this book is Autumn Leaves, a 2012 ebook Gurwitch published with Zola Books that recounts an erotic fantasy she once had about a staff member at an Apple Genius Bar.

Gurwitch once worked for Woody Allen, but was fired during an encounter in which he said that she looked "retarded" among other insults. In 2006 she published a book of essays inspired by that dismissal called Fired!: Tales of the Canned, Canceled, Downsized, and Dismissed which subsequently became the Fired! documentary film.

Gurwitch and then-husband Jeff Kahn signed a six-figure deal with Crown to publish a memoir called You Say Tomato, I Say Shut Up. The two adapted the book into a theatrical production, in association with Off-Broadway Booking.

==== Essays ====
Her essays and satire have been published in The New Yorker, The New York Times, Wall Street Journal, The Los Angeles Times, McSweeney's, and O Magazine, among other publications. She was a regular commentator for NPR's All Things Considered. She frequently makes appearances on NPR including on The Moth, Ask Me Another and Marketplace.

Gurwitch is a contributing writer for NPR's Day to Day, The Los Angeles Times Magazine, The Nation, and she has written for Child, Publishers Weekly, Marie Claire, More, Men's Health, Glamour, Cooking Light, Premiere, Penthouse and Los Angeles.

Her essays have appeared in two anthologies: Note to Self: 30 Women on Hardship, Humiliation, Heartbreak, and Overcoming It All and Rejected: Tales of the Failed, Dumped, and Canceled.

== Personal life ==
She is divorced from writer Jeff Kahn. Gurwitch has one child and lives in Los Angeles. She has written and given talks on how her southern Jewish roots have influenced her family life.

On November 14, 2020, The New York Times published her opinion piece "The Coronavirus Saved My Life", describing how she went in for a COVID-19 test and came out with a stage 4 metastatic lung cancer diagnosis.

== Filmography ==
=== Film ===
- 1987: Kiss Daddy Goodnight – Sue
- 1988: Bright Lights, Big City – Barbara
- 1991: Pizza Man – The Dame
- 1993: Life with Mikey – Debbie
- 1995: Automatic – Gloria Takamatsu
- 1995: Three Wishes – Leland's Mother
- 1996: Shut Yer Mouth! – City Clerk
- 1996: The Cable Guy – Steven's Sister-in-Law
- 1997: 'Til There Was You – Woman in Bathroom
- 1997: Masterminds – Helen
- 1997: One Night Stand – Marie
- 1997: Cadillac – Rose
- 1997: Mouse Hunt – April Smuntz
- 1998: Billy's Hollywood Screen Kiss – Gallery Owner
- 1999: Goosed – Dr. Ruth
- 2000: Pollock – Mary Rosenberg
- 2001: The Medicine Show – Melissa
- 2002: Teddy Bears' Picnic – Jennifer Gersh
- 2002: The 4th Tenor – Gina
- 2003: Manfast – Jessica
- 2003: Daddy Day Care – Becca's Mom
- 2003: Melvin Goes to Dinner – Sarah
- 2006: The Shaggy Dog – Justin Forrester's Attorney
- 2006: Moola – Louise
- 2011: Atlas Shrugged: Part I – Reporter #2
- 2015: It's Us – Marie

=== Television ===
Annabelle Gurwitch television credits
Year	Title	Role	Notes	Ref.
1986	The Guiding Light	Gina Daniels	6 episodes	
1988	Miami Vice	Teri	1 episode	
1988	The Equalizer	Suzanne	Episode: "Video Games" (S3.E14)	
1988	Where the Hell's That Gold?	Jesse	TV movie	
1988	China Beach	Red Cross volunteer, Donna	Episode: "Lost and Found"	
1989	Your Mother Wears Combat Boots	Unknown	TV movie	
1989	Alien Nation	Dr. Marissa Meyers	Episode: "Contact" (S1.E7)	
1991	Chance of a Lifetime	Sherry	TV movie	
1992	Battle in the Erogenous Zone	Garmento	TV short film	
1993	The Tower	Sally	TV movie	
1995	Not Like Us	Vicki	TV movie	
1996	Seinfeld	Katy	Episode: "The Cadillac" (S7.E14)	
1996	Encino Woman	Chris	TV movie	
1996	Intimate Betrayal	Claire	TV movie	
1996	Time Well Spent	Unknown	TV pilot	
1997	Love-Struck	Rachel	TV movie	
1999	Pensacola: Wings of Gold	Agent Bigelow	1 episode	
2006	Boston Legal	Attorney Vivian Marino	1 episode	
2007	State of Mind	Angela	1 episode	
2007	The Minor Accomplishments of Jackie Woodman	Mondi	1 episode	
2008	Medium	Rory Carmer	1 episode	
2009	The Cleaner	Unknown	1 episode	
2009	Cupid	Manday	1 episode	
2010	Dexter	FBI Agent Ross	1 episode	

== Bibliography ==
- Fired! : tales of the canned, canceled, downsized and dismissed, New York: Touchstone, 2006. ISBN 9780743289856, OCLC 974417816
- You say tomato, I say shut up : a love story, New York: Crown Publishers, 2010. ISBN 9780307463777, OCLC 419797211
- I see you made an effort : compliments, indignities, and survival stories from the edge of 50, New York : Blue Rider Press, 2014. ISBN 9780399166181, OCLC 952009094
- Wherever You Go, There They Are: stories about my family you might relate to. Penguin Books, 2018. ISBN 9780399574894, OCLC 994426415
- You're Leaving When?: Adventures in Downward Mobility, Counterpoint Press, 2021. ISBN 9781640094475
- The End of My Life Is Killing Me: The Unexpected Joys of a Cancer Slacker, Zibby Publishing, 2026. ISBN 9781968506063
