= Brendan Fraser =

American and Canadian actor (born 1968)

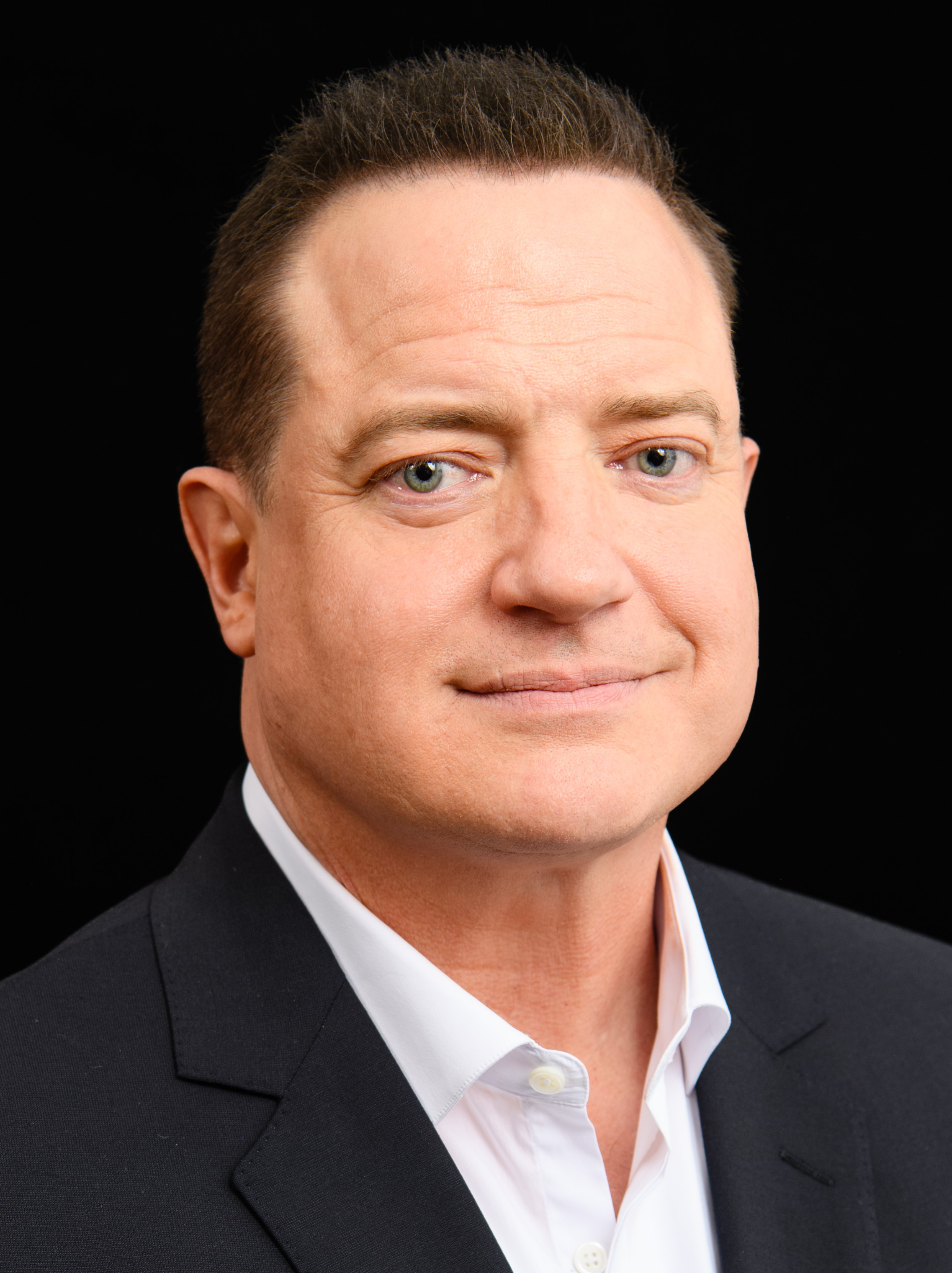
- Fraser at the 2025 Montclair Film Festival
- Born: Brendan James Fraser; December 3, 1968 (age 57); Indianapolis, Indiana, U.S.
- Citizenship: United States; Canada
- Education: Cornish College of the Arts (BFA)
- Occupation: Actor
- Years active: 1990–present
- Works: Full list
- Spouse: Afton Smith (m. 1998; div. 2009)
- Children: 3
- Relatives: George Genereux (uncle)
- Awards: Full list
- Website: brendanfraser.com

Signature
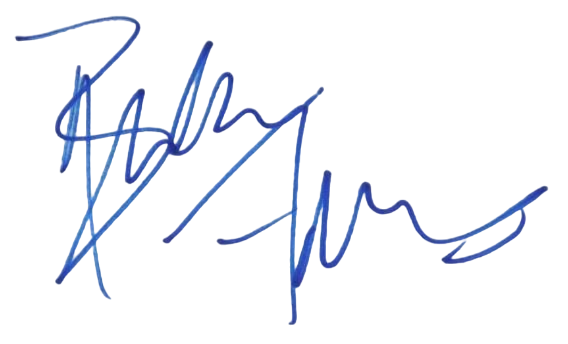

Brendan James Fraser (/ˈfreɪzər/ FRAY-zər; born December 3, 1968) is an American-Canadian actor. Fraser had his breakthrough in 1992 with the comedy Encino Man and the drama School Ties. He gained further prominence for his starring roles in the comedies With Honors (1994) and George of the Jungle (1997) and emerged as a star playing Rick O'Connell in The Mummy films (1999–present). He took on dramatic roles in Gods and Monsters (1998), The Quiet American (2002), and Crash (2004), and further fantasy roles in Bedazzled (2000), Inkheart and Journey to the Center of the Earth (both 2008).

Fraser's film work slowed from the late 2000s to mid-2010s due to poor box office performances and various health and personal issues, including the fallout from a sexual assault allegedly committed against him in 2003 by Philip Berk, the then-president of the Hollywood Foreign Press Association. Later, Fraser branched out into television with roles in the Showtime drama The Affair (2016–2017), the FX series Trust (2018), and the HBO Max series Doom Patrol (2019–2023).

Fraser's film career was revitalized in the 2020s by starring roles in Steven Soderbergh's No Sudden Move (2021), Darren Aronofsky's The Whale (2022), and Rental Family (2025). Fraser's work in The Whale earned him critical acclaim and numerous accolades, including the Academy Award for Best Actor, making him the first Canadian to receive it.

== Early life ==
Fraser was born on December 3, 1968, in Indianapolis to Canadian parents Carol Mary (née Généreux; 1937–2016) and Peter Fraser. He is the youngest of four boys; his brothers are Kevin, Sean, and Regan. His mother was a sales counselor, and his father was a former journalist who worked as a Canadian foreign service officer for the Government Office of Tourism. His maternal uncle, George Genereux, was the only Canadian to win a gold medal in the 1952 Summer Olympics, at the Olympic Trap. Fraser and his three older brothers have Irish, Scottish, German, Czech, and French-Canadian ancestry. He holds dual American and Canadian citizenship.

Fraser's family moved often during his childhood, living in Eureka, California; Seattle, Washington; Ottawa, Ontario; the Netherlands; and Switzerland. His earlier years were spent attending a Montessori school in Detroit and the Sacred Heart School in Bellevue, Washington. He then attended Upper Canada College.

While on vacation in London, in the 1970s, he attended his first professional theater-show, Oliver!, in the West End, which sparked his interest in acting. He also joined the chorus of a high-school musical production of Oklahoma!

Fraser graduated from Seattle's Cornish College of the Arts in 1990. He then began acting at a small acting college in New York City. Fraser had planned on studying toward a Master of Fine Arts in Acting from Southern Methodist University, but after visiting Hollywood, he decided instead to move there to pursue work in film.

== Career ==
=== 1991–1997: Career beginnings ===
In 1991, Fraser made his film debut with a small role as a seaman headed to Vietnam in Dogfight. He got his first leading film role alongside Sean Astin and Pauly Shore in the 1992 comedy film Encino Man, where he played a frozen pre-historic caveman who is thawed out in the present day. The film was a moderate box office success and has gained a cult following. That same year he starred in School Ties with fellow rising actors Matt Damon, Ben Affleck, and Chris O'Donnell as a Jewish star quarterback confronting embedded anti-semitism in private prep school society.

Between 1994 and 1997, he starred in several movies including With Honors (1994) with Joe Pesci, Airheads (1994) with Steve Buscemi & Adam Sandler, The Passion of Darkly Noon (1995), Mrs. Winterbourne (1996), and The Twilight of the Golds (1997). He also had a small part in the 1995 film Now and Then. He made cameo appearances in the Pauly Shore films Son in Law (1993) and In the Army Now (1994), reprising his Encino Man role.

Fraser performed at his first theatre production in 1995 at the Geffen Playhouse, taking on the role of Victor in John Patrick Shanley's Four Dogs and a Bone.

=== 1997–2001: Global success ===
He had his first major box office success with the 1997 comedy film George of the Jungle which was based on the animated series of the same title created by Jay Ward.

Fraser received critical acclaim for his dramatic role in 1998's Gods and Monsters, which was based on the life of James Whale (Ian McKellen), who directed Frankenstein. The film was written and directed by Bill Condon, and follows the loss of creativity, ambiguous sexuality and the bond between a heterosexual gardener (played by Fraser) and a homosexual, tortured and ailing filmmaker (played by McKellen).

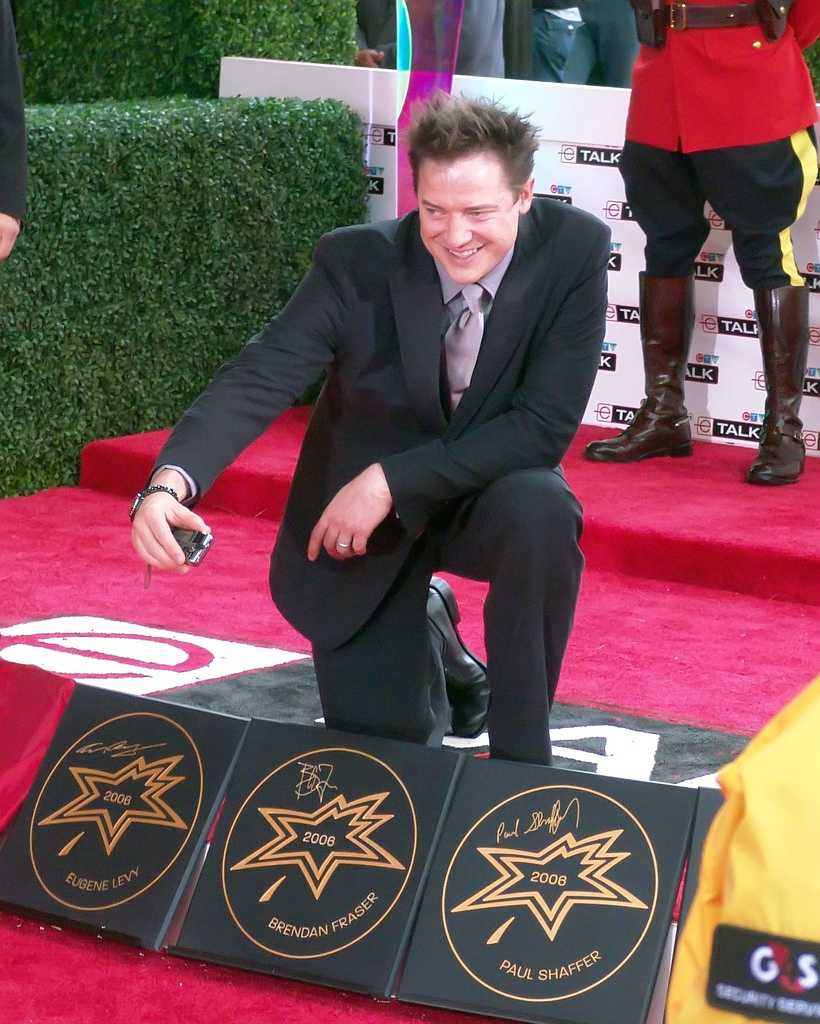
Brendan Fraser at Canada's Walk of Fame in 2006

He achieved his biggest commercial success when he portrayed the lead adventurer Rick O'Connell in the fantasy adventure film The Mummy (1999) and its sequel The Mummy Returns (2001). The Mummy established him as one of the biggest film stars of the 1990s. In between these successes, he also starred in Dudley Do-Right (1999) (which was based on another Jay Ward animated series) and the stop-motion/live-action fantasy comedy Monkeybone (2001); he had success with the romantic comedy Blast from the Past (1999) and the fantasy comedy Bedazzled (2000), a remake of the 1967 British film of the same name. He lent his voice for the unreleased animated film Big Bug Man, with Marlon Brando.

=== 2001–2008: Dramatic and comedic roles ===
In late 2001, Fraser starred as "Brick" in the Pulitzer Prize winning play Tennessee Williams's Cat on a Hot Tin Roof, directed by Anthony Page. Castmates included Ned Beatty, Frances O'Connor and Gemma Jones. The show closed on January 12, 2002, with Fraser garnering many excellent reviews. In 2002, he starred alongside Michael Caine in the political drama The Quiet American which was well received by critics. The following year, he starred in the live-action/animated film Looney Tunes: Back in Action as its human lead, D.J. Drake (he also voiced the Tasmanian Devil). In 2004, he appeared as part of an ensemble cast in the Academy Award-winning film Crash where he played the husband to Sandra Bullock's character as the District Attorney of Los Angeles.

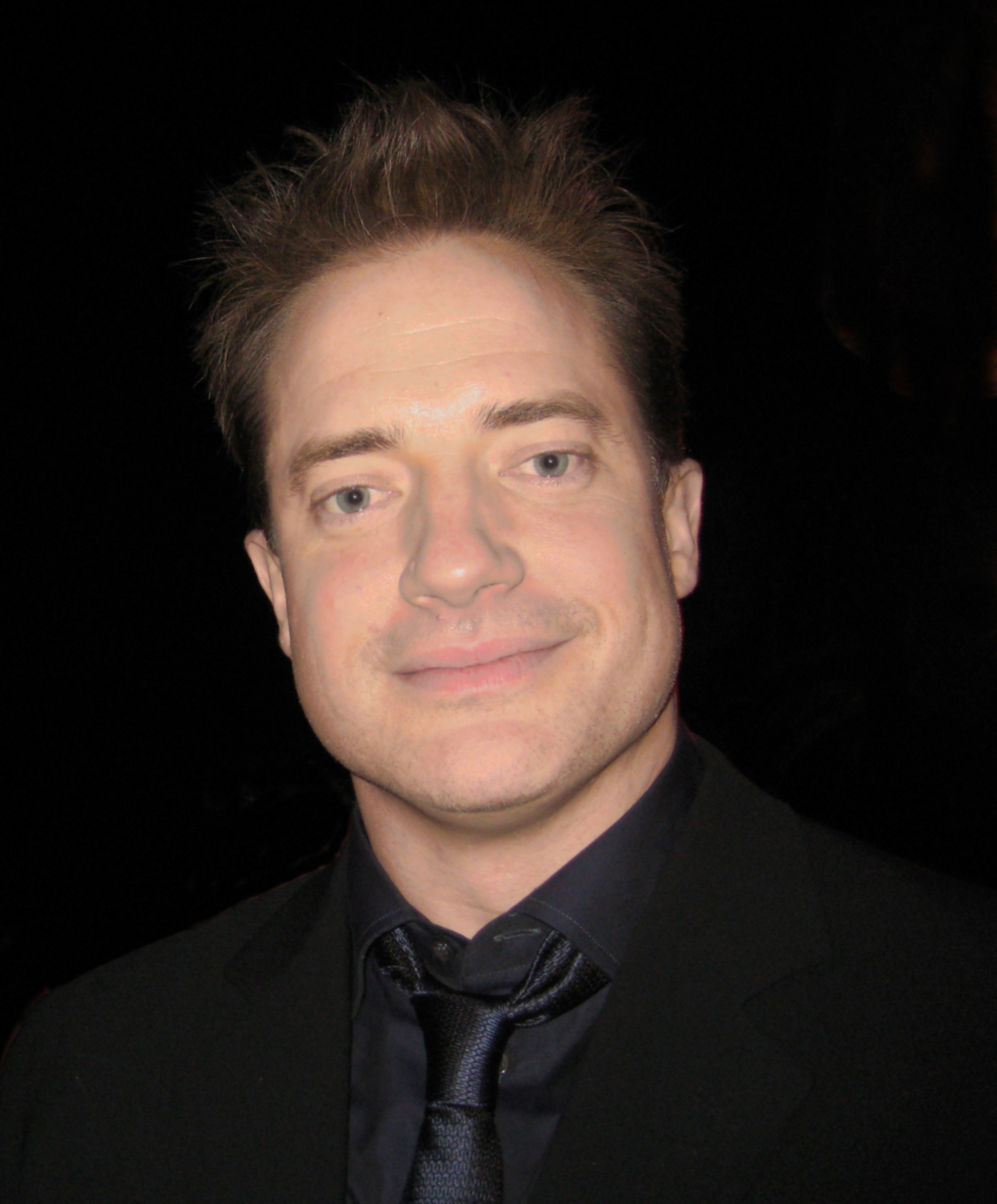
Fraser at the premiere of The Mummy: Tomb of the Dragon Emperor in July 2008

He has also made guest appearances on the television shows Scrubs, King of the Hill, and The Simpsons. In March 2006, he was inducted into Canada's Walk of Fame, the first American-born actor to receive the honor. After a six-year hiatus in the franchise, Fraser returned for the second sequel to The Mummy released in August 2008 and titled The Mummy: Tomb of the Dragon Emperor. Filming started in Montreal on July 27, 2007, and the film also starred Jet Li as Emperor Han. That same year, he starred in the 3D film adaptation of Jules Verne's Journey to the Center of the Earth and the fantasy film Inkheart (chosen personally for the lead role by the novel's author Cornelia Funke).

=== 2009–2020: Setbacks and switch to television ===
In 2010, Fraser returned to Broadway in the production of Elling, but the play closed after one week, due to lackluster reviews. After appearing in the critically panned Furry Vengeance in 2010, Fraser moved from being represented by William Morris Endeavor to the Creative Artists Agency. In 2010, he starred in Whole Lotta Sole directed by Terry George and in 2011, he was set to play William Tell in The Legend of William Tell: 3D, directed by Eric Brevig, with whom Fraser had also worked in Journey to the Center of the Earth. Filming was delayed and late in 2011, Fraser sued the producer Todd Moyer for promised wages. Moyer later countersued for assault, which Fraser dismissed as Moyer's desperate attempt to avoid paying his debt. In 2013, he played an Elvis Presley impersonator in the ensemble black comedy Pawn Shop Chronicles.

In 2016, Fraser replaced Ray Liotta in the Bollywood thriller Line of Descent. Fraser later joined the recurring cast of the television drama series The Affair during season 3 where he portrayed the misery-minded prison guard Gunther. He portrayed Getty family fixer James Fletcher Chace in the FX anthology series Trust, which premiered on March 25, 2018. Fraser portrayed Clifford "Cliff" Steele / Robotman in the Titans TV series, with Jake Michaels physically portraying Robotman. He reprised the role in the spin-off series Doom Patrol, where he voices the character and appears as Steele in flashbacks; Riley Shanahan, replacing Jake Michaels in Titans, physically portrays Robotman.

His comeback after a period of relative inactivity was dubbed "The Brennaissance" by fans. In a 2023 interview on The Graham Norton Show, Fraser acknowledged the portmanteau.

=== 2020–present: Career resurgence and critical acclaim ===
In September 2020, Fraser was cast as gangster Doug Jones in Steven Soderbergh's period crime film No Sudden Move, which was released in 2021. In January 2021, Fraser was announced as the lead in Darren Aronofsky's film The Whale. Aronofsky stated he had looked for the lead role in the movie for a decade, and decided to cast Fraser after seeing him in the trailer of the low-budget Brazilian film Journey to the End of the Night. "A light bulb went off, and I was like, 'Oh, that guy can do it'", he said.

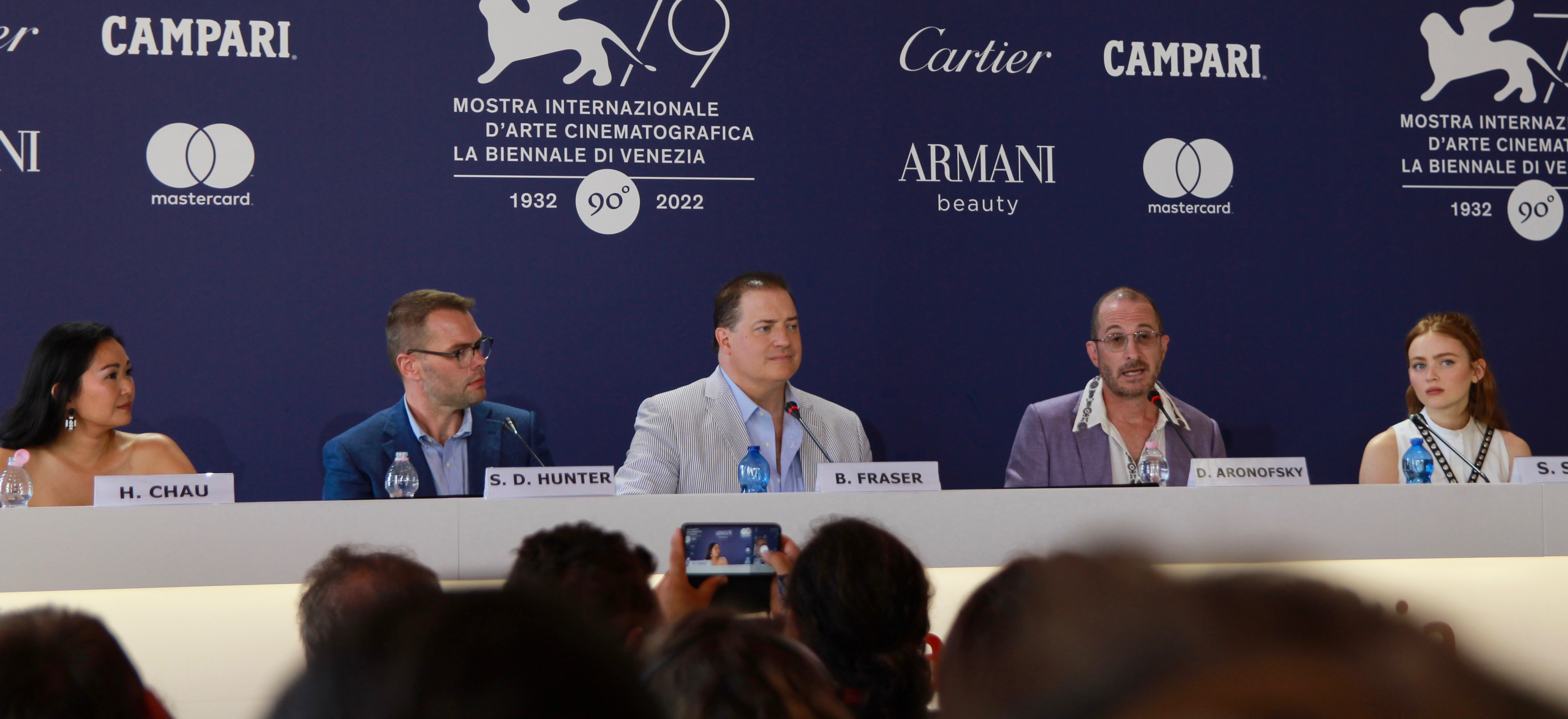
Press conference for The Whale in Venice, September 2022

Fraser spoke on preparing for the role with The New York Times stating, "The Obesity Action Coalition gave me access to many people, so I could ask them their story on Zoom calls. I talked to maybe eight or 10 people — some bedridden, some perfectly mobile." The film premiered at the Venice International Film Festival in September 2022. Fraser's performance was highly praised and the film received a six-minute standing ovation at the festival and subsequently won him an Oscar for Best Actor, making him the first Canadian to win in this category.

In August of the same year, Fraser was announced as part of the cast of Martin Scorsese's film Killers of the Flower Moon, as well as Max Barbakow's comedy film Brothers. In October 2021, Fraser was cast to portray the villain Firefly in the superhero film Batgirl, set in the DC Extended Universe; the release of the film was canceled in August 2022 after a change in Warner Bros. studio priorities.

Fraser lent his voice to the audiodrama The Downloaded, written by Robert J. Sawyer, which was released in Autumn of 2023 as an Audible-exclusive audiobook. In December 2023, Fraser was a guest narrator at Disney's Candlelight Processional at Walt Disney World. In July 2024, it was announced that Fraser would star as Dwight D. Eisenhower in Pressure.

In November 2025, it was reported that Fraser would be reprising his role as Rick O'Connell in The Mummy: Book of the Dead.

== Personal life ==
On July 4, 1993, shortly after he had arrived in Los Angeles, Fraser met actress Afton Smith at a barbecue at Winona Ryder's house. Smith appeared as a minor cast member in Fraser's George of the Jungle film. They married on September 27, 1998, and have three sons together, born in 2002, 2004, and 2006. Two sons are fashion models signed with Marilyn Agency.

In April 2007, Fraser and his wife sold their home in Beverly Hills, California, for $3 million. In December 2007, Fraser's publicist announced the couple had decided to divorce. Fraser was ordered to make monthly alimony payments of $50,000 for ten years or until Smith remarried, whichever came first, and monthly child support payments of $25,000. In early 2011, Fraser asked the court to reduce his alimony payments, asserting he was unable to meet the annual obligation of $600,000; he did not contest the child support payments. In late 2011, Smith accused Fraser of fraudulently failing to disclose some of his financial assets, including contracts for two films: Extraordinary Measures and Furry Vengeance. In 2014, the court ruled against both Fraser's request for alimony reduction and Smith's fraud allegation. Fraser and his ex-wife both received public praise for being actively engaged in their sons' lives. Smith has since turned from acting to book-writing and real estate.

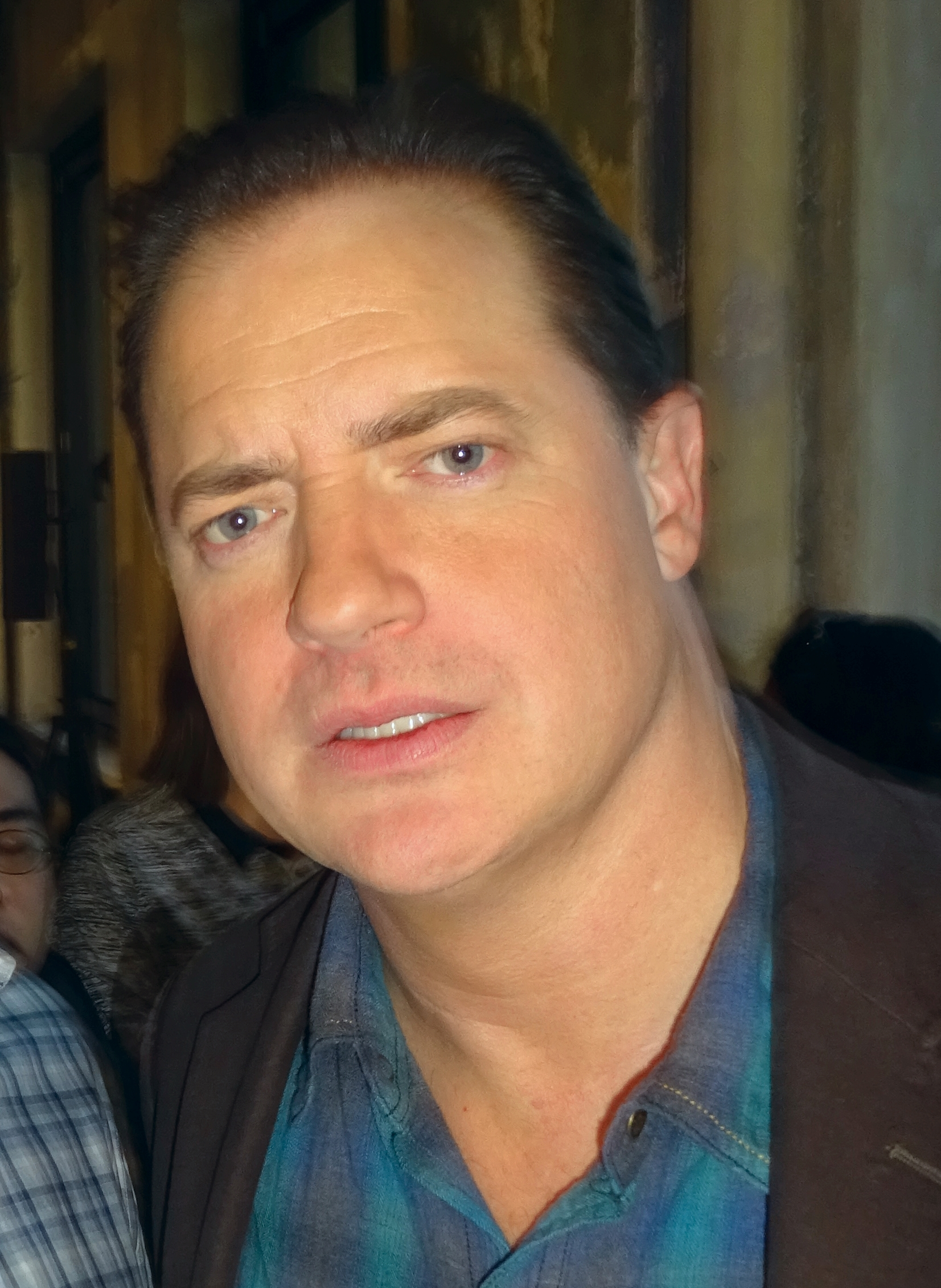
Fraser in New York City in December 2016

Since September 2022, Fraser has been in a relationship with makeup artist Jeanne Moore. The couple made their red-carpet debut at the 2022 Venice Film Festival, and Fraser expressed his gratitude to Moore during his acceptance speech for the Oscar for Best Actor at the 95th Academy Awards.

Fraser speaks French and serves on the board of directors for FilmAid International. He is an accomplished amateur photographer and has used several instant cameras in movies and on TV shows, most notably in his guest roles on Scrubs. In his first appearance, he used a Polaroid pack film, and in his second appearance, he used a Holga with a Polaroid back, a Japanese-only model. He is an accomplished amateur archer.

=== Health ===
In 2018, Fraser stated publicly how the physical demands of stunts and other activities he had performed in some films led to several surgeries over a period of seven years, including a partial knee replacement, a laminectomy, and vocal-cord surgery.

=== Sexual assault allegation against Philip Berk ===
In 2018, Fraser disclosed a sexual assault allegation against Philip Berk, the president of the Hollywood Foreign Press Association (HFPA), the nonprofit organization that votes for the Golden Globe Awards. Fraser claimed Berk assaulted him by groping his groin and genitals during a 2003 industry luncheon, and also said the incident triggered a mental health crisis and fear of speaking up and harming his career. Berk initially described Fraser's account as a "total fabrication", but in his 2014 memoir, he acknowledged having groped Fraser "in jest". The stress Fraser experienced from a succession of events, including his divorce, his health problems, the death of his mother, and discussing the Berk incident plunged him into a depression that led to a break in his career.

Several publications and social media users assumed Fraser had been blacklisted from Hollywood because of his accusation against Berk. In the 2018 GQ article in which Fraser first made his allegation public, he said, "The phone does stop ringing in your career, and you start asking yourself why. There's many reasons, but was [my allegation] one of them? I think it was." In Fraser's 2019 appearance on the radio show Sway in the Morning, he expressed a different view, saying, "I don't think the HFPA really wield that much power." In 2022, Fraser told GQ that if the HFPA nominated him for a Golden Globe that year for his most recent film, The Whale, he would "not participate" because of his "history" with the organization. He was nominated for Best Actor in a Motion Picture – Drama and did not attend the event; he lost the award to Austin Butler.

== Philanthropy ==
Since 2018, Fraser has been a celebrity judge on the Dancing Stars of Greenwich annual charity gala which raises money for Abilis, a nonprofit organization that supports more than 800 individuals and their families with disabilities in Fairfield County, Connecticut. His former wife, Afton Smith, also takes part in the dance competition. In 2022, Smith and Fraser received the Heart of Abilis Award for their support and fundraising work for the charity.
