= List of awards and nominations received by Brendan Fraser =

Brendan Fraser awards and nominations
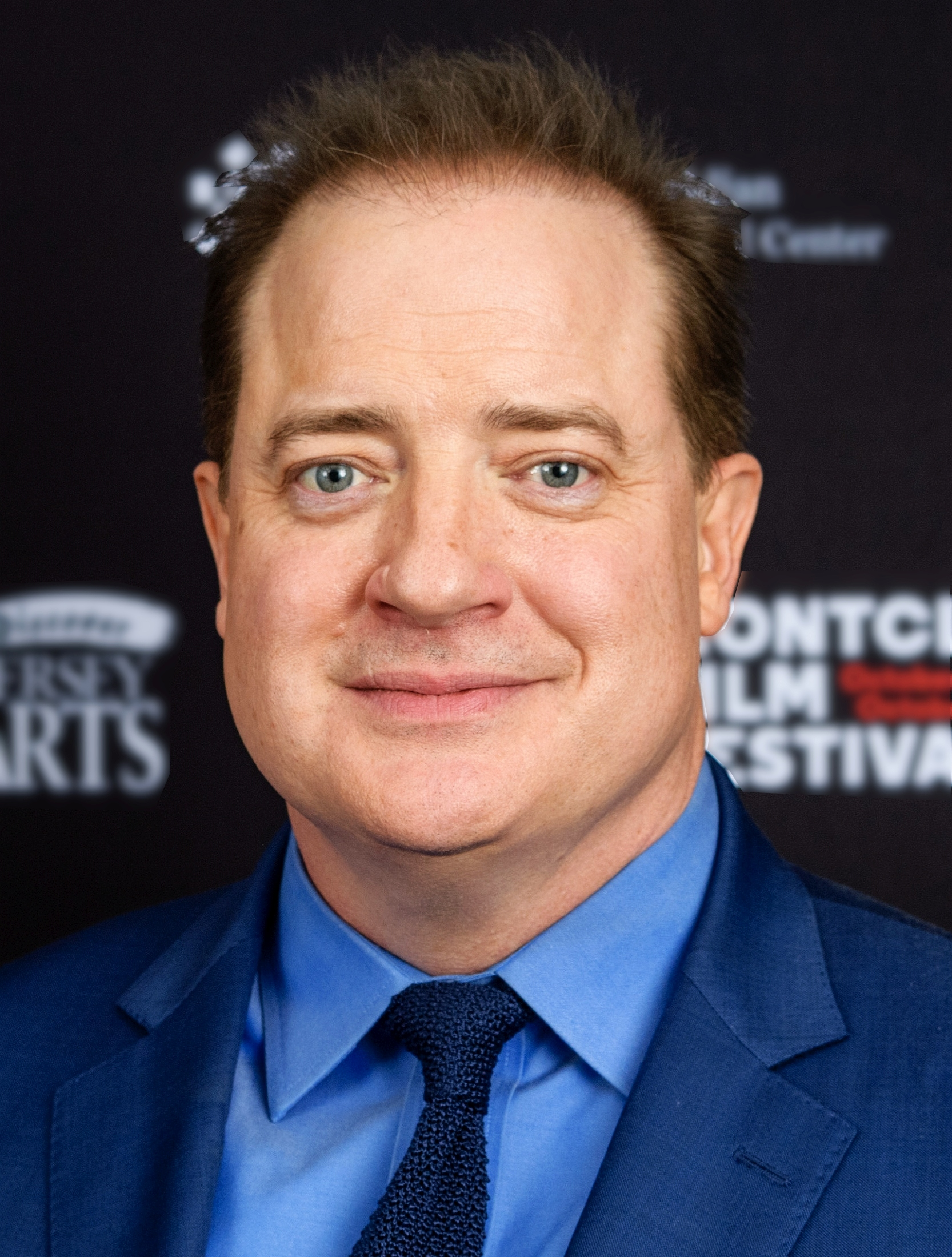
- Fraser in 2022
Awards and nominations
Award	Wins	Nominations
Academy Awards	1	1
British Academy Film Awards	0	1
Golden Globe Awards	0	1
Screen Actors Guild Awards	2	3

Totals (Note: Certain award groups do not simply award one winner. They acknowledge several different recipients, have runners-up, and have third place. Since this is a specific recognition and is different from losing an award, runner-up mentions are considered wins in this award tally. For simplification and to avoid errors, each award in this list has been presumed to have had a prior nomination.)
- Wins: 31
- Nominations: 80

The following is a list of awards and nominations received by Brendan Fraser.

Brendan Fraser is American and Canadian actor known for his leading roles in comedic and dramatic films. Among his accolades include an Academy Award, a Critics' Choice Movie Award, and two Screen Actors Guild Awards as well as nominations for a BAFTA Award and a Golden Globe Award.

For his comedic role in Encino Man (1992) he won the Chicago Film Critics Association for Breakthrough Performance. He portrayed Rick O'Connell in The Mummy trilogy (1999–2008) earning nominations for the Teen Choice Award, a Kids' Choice Awards and a Saturn Award. He played a district attorney in the Paul Haggis directed crime drama film Crash (2005) and won with the cast the Screen Actors Guild Award for Outstanding Performance by a Cast in a Motion Picture and the Critics' Choice Movie Award for Best Acting Ensemble.

For his performance in the 2022 psychological drama film The Whale playing an morbidly obese English teacher, Fraser garnered various accolades including the Academy Award for Best Actor and the Screen Actors Guild Award for Outstanding Performance by a Male Actor in a Leading Role as well as nominations for the BAFTA Award for Best Actor in a Leading Role, a Critics' Choice Movie Award and a Golden Globe Award for Best Actor in a Motion Picture – Drama. He played a lawyer in the Martin Scorsese-directed revisionist Western epic Killers of the Flower Moon (2023) for which he was nominated with the cast for the Screen Actors Guild Award for Outstanding Performance by a Cast in a Motion Picture.

== Major associations ==
=== Academy Awards ===
Year	Category	Nominated work	Result	Ref.
2022	Best Actor	The Whale	Won	

=== BAFTA Awards ===
Year	Category	Nominated work	Result	Ref.
2022	Best Actor in a Leading Role	The Whale	Nominated	

=== Critics' Choice Awards ===
Year	Category	Nominated work	Result	Ref.
Critics' Choice Movie Awards
2005	Best Cast	Crash	Won	
2022	Best Actor	The Whale	Won	
Critics' Choice Super Awards
2022	Best Actor in a Superhero Series	Doom Patrol	Nominated	
2023	Best Actor in a Superhero Series	Doom Patrol	Nominated	

=== Golden Globe Awards ===
Year	Category	Nominated work	Result	Ref.
2022	Best Actor – Motion Picture – Drama	The Whale	Nominated	

=== Screen Actors Guild Awards ===
Year	Category	Nominated work	Result	Ref.
2005	Outstanding Cast in a Motion Picture	Crash	Won	
2022	Outstanding Actor in a Leading Role	The Whale	Won	
2024	Outstanding Cast in a Motion Picture	Killers of the Flower Moon	Nominated	

== Awards and nominations ==
Year	Association	Category	Work	Result	Ref.
1993	Chicago Film Critics Association	Most Promising Actor	Encino Man	Won	
1997	Seattle International Film Festival	Best Actor	Still Breathing	Won	
1998	Blockbuster Entertainment Awards	Favorite Actor/Actress – Family	George of the Jungle	Nominated	
1999	Chlotrudis Awards	Best Supporting Actor	Gods and Monsters	Nominated	
2000	Saturn Award	Best Actor	The Mummy	Nominated	
2000	Blockbuster Entertainment Award	Favorite Actor – Action	The Mummy	Nominated	
2001	Teen Choice Awards	Film – Choice Actor	The Mummy Returns	Nominated	
2002	Kids' Choice Awards	Favorite Movie Actor	The Mummy Returns	Nominated	
2002	Online Film & Television Association	Best Guest Actor in a Comedy Series	Scrubs	Nominated	
2004	Online Film & Television Association	Best Guest Actor in a Comedy Series	Scrubs	Won	
2005	Gotham Awards	Best Ensemble Cast	Crash	Nominated	
2005	Hollywood Film Festival Award	Ensemble of the Year	Crash	Won	
2008	National Movie Awards	Best Male Performance	The Mummy: Tomb of the Dragon Emperor	Nominated	
2008	ShoWest Award	Distinguished Decade of Achievement in Film Award	—N/a	Won	
2009	IGN Summer Movie Awards	Favorite Cameo	G.I. Joe: The Rise of Cobra	Nominated	
2022	Black Film Critics Circle Awards	Best Actor	The Whale	Won	
2022	Capri Hollywood International Film Festival	Best Actor	The Whale	Won	
2022	Las Vegas Film Critics Society	Best Actor	The Whale	Won	
2022	Nevada Film Critics Society	Best Actor	The Whale	Won	
2022	New Mexico Film Critics Awards	Best Actor	The Whale	Won	
2022	North Texas Film Critics Association	Best Actor	The Whale	Won	
2022	Philadelphia Film Critics Circle	Best Actor	The Whale	Won	
2022	Phoenix Critics Circle	Best Actor	The Whale	Won	
2022	Phoenix Film Critics Society	Best Actor	The Whale	Won	
2022	St. Louis Gateway Film Critics Association	Best Actor	The Whale	Won	
2022	TIFF Tribute Awards	Actor Award	The Whale	Won	
2022	Women Film Critics Circle	Best Actor	The Whale	Won	
2022	Dallas–Fort Worth Film Critics Association	Best Actor	The Whale	Runner-up	
2022	Florida Film Critics Circle	Best Actor (shared with Park Hae-il)	The Whale	Runner-up	
2022	Sunset Circle Awards	Best Actor	The Whale	Nominated	
2022	Chicago Film Critics Association	Best Actor	The Whale	Nominated	
2022	Gotham Independent Film Awards	Outstanding Lead Performance	The Whale	Nominated	
2022	Greater Western New York Film Critics Association	Best Actor	The Whale	Nominated	
2022	Indiana Film Journalists Association	Best Lead Performance	The Whale	Nominated	
2022	North Carolina Film Critics Association	Best Actor	The Whale	Nominated	
2022	Online Association of Female Film Critics	Best Male Lead	The Whale	Nominated	
2022	Southeastern Film Critics Association Awards	Best Actor	The Whale	Nominated	
2022	UK Film Critics Association	Best Actor	The Whale	Nominated	
2022	Washington D.C. Area Film Critics Association	Best Actor	The Whale	Nominated	
2023	Satellite Awards	Best Actor – Motion Picture	The Whale	Won	
2023	AARP Movies for Grownups Award	Best Actor	The Whale	Won	
2023	Critics Association Of Central Florida	Best Actor	The Whale	Won	
2023	DiscussingFilm Critic Awards	Best Actor	The Whale	Won	
2023	Hawaii Film Critics Society	Best Actor	The Whale	Won	
2023	Hollywood Critics Association	Best Actor	The Whale	Won	
2023	Music City Film Critics Association	Best Actor	The Whale	Won	
2023	North Dakota Film Society	Best Actor	The Whale	Won	
2023	Oklahoma Film Critics Circle	Best Actor	The Whale	Won	
2023	Palm Springs International Film Festival	Spotlight Award	The Whale	Won	
2023	Santa Barbara International Film Festival	American Riviera Award	The Whale	Awarded	
2023	Columbus Film Critics Association	Best Lead Performance	The Whale	Runner-up	
2023	Georgia Film Critics Association	Best Actor	The Whale	Runner-up	
2023	Iowa Film Critics Association	Best Actor	The Whale	Runner-up	
2023	Kansas City Film Critics Circle	Best Lead Actor	The Whale	Runner-up	
2023	Toronto Film Critics Association	Best Actor	The Whale	Runner-up	
2023	AACTA International Awards	Best Actor – International	The Whale	Nominated	
2023	Alliance of Women Film Journalists	Best Actor	The Whale	Nominated	
2023	Austin Film Critics Association	Best Actor	The Whale	Nominated	
2023	Chicago Indie Critics	Best Actor	The Whale	Nominated	
2023	Denver Film Critics Society	Best Actor	The Whale	Nominated	
2023	Dorian Awards	Lead Film Performance of the Year	The Whale	Nominated	
2023	Houston Film Critics Society	Best Actor	The Whale	Nominated	
2023	Latino Entertainment Journalists Association	Best Actor	The Whale	Nominated	
2023	London Film Critics' Circle	Actor of the Year	The Whale	Nominated	
2023	Minnesota Film Critics Alliance	Best Actor	The Whale	Nominated	
2023	North Carolina Film Critics Association	Best Actor	The Whale	Nominated	
2023	Online Film Critics Society	Best Actor	The Whale	Nominated	
2023	Portland Critics Association	Best Actor	The Whale	Nominated	
2023	San Diego Film Critics Society	Best Actor	The Whale	Nominated	
2023	San Francisco Bay Area Film Critics Circle	Best Actor	The Whale	Nominated	
2023	Seattle Film Critics Society	Best Actor	The Whale	Nominated	
