= You Say Tomato, I Say Shut Up =

2010 book by Annabelle Gurwitch and Jeff Kahn

You Say Tomato, I Say Shut Up: A Love Story
- Author: Annabelle Gurwitch and Jeff Kahn
- Published: 2010 (Crown)
- ISBN: 0-307-46377-X

You Say Tomato, I Say Shut Up: A Love Story is a 2010 book by Annabelle Gurwitch and Jeff Kahn. The book concerns the authors' thirteen years of marriage and life with their son Ezra, who was born with VACTERL. The book is written in a "he said, she said" style, with each chapter featuring alternating viewpoints. The book was published by Crown Publishing on February 23, 2010.
