= In the Army Now (film) =

- Theatrical release poster
- Directed by: Daniel Petrie, Jr.
- Screenplay by: Ken Kaufman; Stu Krieger; Daniel Petrie, Jr. Fax Bahr; Adam Small
- Story by: Steve Zacharias; Jeff Buhai; Robbie Fox
- Produced by: Michael Rotenberg
- Starring: Pauly Shore; Lori Petty; David Alan Grier; Andy Dick; Esai Morales
- Cinematography: William Wages
- Edited by: O. Nicholas Brown
- Music by: Robert Folk
- Production company: Hollywood Pictures
- Distributed by: Buena Vista Pictures Distribution
- Release date: August 12, 1994
- Running time: 92 minutes
- Country: United States
- Language: English
- Box office: $28.9 million

In the Army Now is a 1994 American war comedy film directed by Daniel Petrie, Jr., written by Ken Kaufman, Stu Krieger, Daniel Petrie, Jr., Fax Bahr, and Adam Small, and starring Pauly Shore, Andy Dick, David Alan Grier, Esai Morales, and Lori Petty. The film earned US$28,881,266 at the box office, making it the fourth-highest-grossing film starring Pauly Shore (behind Encino Man, Son in Law and A Goofy Movie).

== Plot ==
Slackers Bones Conway and Jack Kaufman work at "Crazy Boys" discount electronics store in Glendale, California. While goofing off on the job, both aspire to open their own electronics store in the future. Both are fired though after destroying a rack of television sets.

Looking to score some quick start-up money for their store and believing that the commitment will be minimal (they are easily lured by the recruiting slogan "One weekend a month, two weeks a year"), the two join the United States Army Reserves. Bones chooses water purification for their field since his brother was an experienced pool man and the field appeared to be devoid of combat. After surviving basic training, they attend water purification training, meeting up with Christine Jones, a female recruit longing for infantry, and skittish dental student Fred Ostroff. Adopting the nickname of "waterboys", the group then returns to Glendale.

Unbeknownst to Bones and Jack, Libya has been planning an invasion of Chad, and they are consequently called up for service overseas. They first try to get a military discharge by pretending to be homosexuals, but they fail.

Upon arriving in Chad, the four do not get along well with the full-time soldiers, particularly Special Forces Staff Sergeant Stern. On a routine mission to resupply a forward base, their convoy is ambushed by a Libyan commando squad. The misfit reserves are thought to have been killed in action (KIA) and are left to fend for themselves. After a few days lost in the desert, they are captured by the Libyan forces and spend a night in a Libyan POW camp. There the reservists meet up with Staff Sergeant Stern who has been shot and captured in an ambush. He briefs them on his failed mission to rendezvous with two HALOed Fast Attack vehicles and destroy mobile Scud launchers carrying missiles armed with chemical warheads aimed at American bases in the region.

During an airstrike, the four reservists and Stern escape and find the Fast Attack vehicles. They make contact with the American headquarters and are ordered to finish the Special Forces' mission. After locating the missiles, they have a difficult time holding off a battalion of Libyans while painting the missiles with a laser for an incoming airstrike. The airstrike goes off-target, forcing the reservists to destroy the missiles themselves. Bones grabs an AT4 anti-tank rocket launcher and destroys the Scud launcher base in one hit, but not before accidentally firing one rocket backwards, forcing the group to use the last rocket they have.

The "waterboys" return home as heroes. At the end of the film, they open up their electronics shop next to an Army recruiting station — where two men like themselves are looking skeptical about joining the reserves.

== Cast ==
- Pauly Shore as Private First Class Bones Conway, the former leader of the Crazy Boys later the leader of the Waterboys
- Lori Petty as Private Christine Jones, Bones's love interest and the female member of the Waterboys
- David Alan Grier as Private Fred Ostroff, Bones's new friend and the member of the Waterboys
- Andy Dick as Private Jack Kaufman, Bones's friend and the former co-leader of the Crazy Boys later the co-leader of the Waterboys
- Esai Morales as Staff Sergeant Stern
- Lynn Whitfield as Drill Sergeant Ladd
- Fabiana Udenio as Gabriella
- Art LaFleur as First Sergeant Brandon T. Williams
- Glenn Morshower as Recruiting Sergeant Richard Day
- Beau Billingslea as Sergeant Daniels
- Peter Spellos as Mr. Quinn
- Brendan Fraser as Linkovich "Link" Chomovsky, a fellow soldier (reprising his role of Encino Man in a cameo appearance)

== Production ==
Pauly Shore had a three-film contract with Disney to make Encino Man, Son in Law, and In the Army Now.

The two main characters play miniature golf at the Malibu Castle located in Hawthorne, California. It was torn down in 2005. The basic training scene was filmed at Fort Sill, located near Lawton, Oklahoma. The water treatment training was filmed at Fort Lee, Virginia. Shore actually went through the water treatment training to better understand the job. The desert scenes were filmed in Yuma, Arizona. The camp in Chad was filmed at Vasquez Rocks in Agua Dulce, California.

== Reception ==
In the Army Now was universally panned by critics. It holds a 12% approval rating on Rotten Tomatoes based on 34 reviews, with an average score of 2.6/10. The consensus states "This 1994 Pauly Shore vehicle stretches its star's thin shtick to the breaking point with a laugh-deficient screenplay that borrows shamelessly from Bill Murray's far superior Stripes".

In year-end lists, it scored 8th worst by Sean P. Means of The Salt Lake Tribune, a dishonorable mention by Dan Craft of The Pantagraph, and worst (not ranked) by Bob Ross of The Tampa Tribune.
