= Minding the Store =

2005 television series

- Genre: Reality television
- Written by: Jasmine Morales, Bob Hellman
- Starring: Pauly Shore
- Composers: Alec Puro, Ryan Rehm, Raney Shockne
- Country of origin: United States
- Original language: English
- No. of seasons: 1
- No. of episodes: 10

Production
- Executive producers: Rob Lee, Arnold Shapiro, Rich Meehan, Allison Grodner
- Running time: approx. 22 minutes

Original release
- Network: TBS
- Release: July 15, 2005 – 2005

Minding the Store is a 2005 American reality television show which aired on TBS. It stars comedian Pauly Shore, who in the show made efforts to revitalize his acting career and run the family business, The Comedy Store.

== Content ==
The show is a reality television series in which comedian Pauly Shore runs The Comedy Store, the comedy club run by his family. Features of the series include him attempting to add new features to the club, such as food service. Shore's parents, Mitzi Shore and Sammy Shore, also make appearances. Shore himself said of the series that he found it unusual since it was the first work in which he was required to play a straight man role.

Shore pledged to send a dollar to anyone who viewed the show's first episode and failed to laugh.

== Critical reception ==
Ted Cox of the Arlington Heights, Illinois Daily Herald gave the show a mostly positive review. Although he thought the segments focused more on Shore's personal life than the comedy club were "dull", he also thought that Shore showed "some humility", and thought that setting the show in a comedy club added several opportunities for humor.
