= Philip Berk =

American film industry executive (born 1933)

- Born: February 13, 1933 (age 93); Cape Town, South Africa
- Education: UCLA School of Theater, Film and Television
- Occupations: Journalist, film industry executive, film critic
- Years active: 1955–2021
- Spouse: Ruth Greenberg (m. 1954)
- Children: 4

Philip W. Berk (born February 13, 1933) is a South African–American former film industry executive, journalist, and film critic . He served for eight years as president of the Hollywood Foreign Press Association and was an influential member of the organization for several decades.

Two scandals, in which Berk sexually assaulted actor Brendan Fraser in 2003 and criticised Black Lives Matter in 2021, led to his expulsion from the association.

== Early life and family ==
Philip Woolf Berk was born on February 13, 1933, in Cape Town, South Africa.

In 1955, Berk graduated from the University of California, Los Angeles School of Theater, Film and Television with a Bachelor of Arts degree. In 1954, Berk married Ruth Greenberg, and they have four children. He is Jewish.

== Career ==
Berk worked as a journalist and produced international events as a freelancer. He worked as a writer for publications in Malaysia and South Africa, and was the film critic of the B'nai B'rith Messenger, a Jewish newspaper. In the 1990s, Berk served as secretary of the Los Angeles Film Critics Association.

Berk was a member of the Hollywood Foreign Press Association for 44 years and served terms as the organization's president and treasurer.

Berk taught journalism at Cleveland High School in Reseda, California. He was the editor of the school newspaper and taught a Cinema class for many years.

=== Memoir ===
In 2014, Berk angered members of the Hollywood Foreign Press after he published a memoir titled With Signs and Wonders – My Journey from Darkest Africa to the Bright Lights of Hollywood, which detailed the inner workings of the organization and told stories of some of his colleagues. Following the book's publication, Berk took a leave of absence from the organization.

== Controversies ==
=== Brendan Fraser sexual harassment accusation ===
In 2018, actor Brendan Fraser accused Berk of having groped his buttocks and perineum after a luncheon in 2003. The Hollywood Foreign Press Association commissioned an internal investigation, which concluded that while "Berk inappropriately touched Mr. Fraser, the evidence supports that it was intended to be taken as a joke and not as a sexual advance.” Officials asked Fraser to sign a joint statement about the matter but would not share the complete findings with him. Several publications and social media users inferred that Fraser was blacklisted from Hollywood because of his accusation against Berk, which Berk denied. After returning to acting with The Whale in 2022, Fraser declined to attend the 2023 Golden Globe Awards ceremony due to a lack of reconciliation or apology regarding his assault accusations. Berk has described Fraser's account as a "total fabrication". However in his 2014 memoir, he admitted to having pinched Fraser's backside "in jest".

=== Email and expulsion ===
In 2021, the board of the Hollywood Foreign Press Association permanently expelled Berk as a member of the organization after he sent an email to other members where he quoted an article that described Black Lives Matter as a "racist hate movement" and referred to Patrisse Cullors for referring to herself as a "trained Marxist". After Berk sent the email, NBC called for Berk's immediate expulsion from the organization to move forward with the Golden Globes. After Berk's removal from the organization, the board stated that it "condemn[ed] all forms of racism, discrimination and hate speech and finds such language and content unacceptable."
