= Jeff Kahn (writer) =

American writer and actor

- Occupations: Actor; screenwriter; writer
- Years active: 1988–present
- Spouse: Annabelle Gurwitch (1996–2021)
- Children: 1

Jeff Kahn is an American writer and actor. He started out writing for the MTV show Remote Control, and won a Primetime Emmy in 1993 for Outstanding Individual Achievement in Writing in a Variety or Music Program for his work in The Ben Stiller Show. Kahn was married to actress Annabelle Gurwitch from 1996 to 2019. He resides in Los Angeles. He and Gurwitch have one child. He has also written for the Huffington Post.

== Filmography ==
- Drillbit Taylor (2008)
- Tropic Thunder (2008)
- The 40-Year-Old Virgin (2005)
- Crazy Ex-Girlfriend
- The Ben Stiller Show
- The Cable Guy (1996)
