= The Fabulous Wonder Twins =

Drag queen duo

- Born: Louis Alberto Campos; Carlos Eduardo Campos; October 28, 1967 (age 58); San Salvador, El Salvador
- Occupations: Entertainment personalities, actors, models, performance artists, club kid stars

Louis Alberto Campos and Carlos Eduardo Campos (born October 28, 1967), known as The Fabulous Wonder Twins, are a pair of identical twin brothers who have performed together as drag queens.

== Early life ==
Born in San Salvador, El Salvador, in 1967, the brothers frequently snuck into traveling circus performances as young children. The twins moved to Monrovia, California, when they were 11. They were bullied in high school for their fashion choices, which drew inspiration from Pete Burns, Boy George, Nina Hagen, Grace Jones, and Divine. They began going to underage clubs when they were 15.

== Career ==
After the pair discovered drag in their late teens, they embraced it. In the 1990s they traveled to Spain, New York, and Los Angeles, where they sometimes performed.

The pair have been featured in MTV music videos, made cameos on film and television motion pictures and have appeared on several talk shows, from The Jerry Springer Show to The Geraldo Rivera Show. The Twins have also participated in several fashion shows, performance art pieces, gay pride parades, and club appearances from Los Angeles to New York City and across the Atlantic, some of these being fundraisers for AIDS charities and organizations. In addition, the Twins have been photographed for various gay-oriented and fashion-related American and European magazines.

== Awards ==
Due to their extensive representation of the LGBT community in the media, their collaborations for the same and overall achievements as drag performer, The Twins were inducted into the Drag Queen Hall of Fame. According to Michelle Lolli, style editor and club columnist for Urb magazine, "To be a truly successful club kid, one has to have talent and creativity behind the wild facade. Everyone from here to New York says how wonderful The Wonder Twins are!"

The Fabulous Wonder Twins hold the World Wide Record for “Most Featured Appearances on Music Videos for Major Recording Artists”. They have appeared in 21 music videos, which have aired on MTV, VH1, and other television broadcasting networks.

== Videography ==
- "Everlasting Love" (1994), Gloria Estefan
- "If It Makes You Happy", Sheryl Crow
- "Long Long Time", Love Spit Love
- "Vertigogo", Combustible Edison
- "I Will Survive!", Diana Ross & Rupaul
- "DJ, Drop That Beat!", Richard Humpty Vission
- "Feels So Good (Show Me Your Love)", Lina Santiago
- "Alcohol", Howlin' Maggie
- "Blame", Collective Soul
- "Tell Me What Can I Do To Make You Love Me?", Worthy Davies
- "Wicked", Econoline Crush

== Cameos ==
- Eraser, Gay club scene with Arnold Schwarzenegger Chuck Russell, director.
- The Drew Carey Show, Priscilla Queen Of The Desert Vs. The Rocky Horror Picture Show Special.
- Encino Woman, VIP guests. Shawn Schepps, director.
- The Birdcage (1996), Gay bar scene. Mike Nichols, director.
- Unhappily Ever After, Hairstylists. Warner Bros.
- The Burning Zone Good Twin/Evil Twin.
- Party Girl (Pilot), Teddy and Eddy. Fox
- Beverly Hills 90210 Spelling Television.
- Casa Hollywood, Mark Decker, director.
- Fired Up! (Pilot)

== See also ==
- List of drag groups
- List of drag queens
