= Totally Pauly =

American television series

- Totally Pauly television logo
- Starring: Pauly Shore
- Country of origin: United States
- Original language: English

Production
- Production company: MTV

Original release
- Release: 1990 – 1997

Totally Pauly is an MTV television series starring Pauly Shore. The series largely consisted of Shore's character interviewing celebrities, performing short comic bits, and introducing music videos. The show was broadcast intermittently on MTV between 1990-97 with regular broadcasts occurring between 1990 and 1995.

== Critical reception ==
Entertainment Weekly gave the show a C+ rating, saying, "Tons o' teens are tuning in to Pauly Shore, who, in the guise of a roving VJ, interrupts MTV's ceaseless flow of Skid Row and Van Halen videos to stroll through malls and converse in a modified San Fernando Valley-speak."
