= Adopted (film) =

- Theatrical poster
- Directed by: Pauly Shore
- Written by: Pauly Shore
- Produced by: Ann Roberts; Pauly Shore
- Starring: Pauly Shore
- Music by: The Newton Brothers
- Distributed by: Phase 4 Films
- Release date: 2009
- Running time: 80 minutes
- Country: United States
- Language: English

Adopted is a 2009 American independent mockumentary film starring comedian Pauly Shore as himself, "going to Africa to adopt a child, à la Madonna and Angelina Jolie." It is the second narrative feature directed by Shore.

== Plot ==
According to Dan Persons of HuffPost,

Pauly follows in the footsteps of Angelina Jolie and Madonna, travelling to South Africa to snag himself one of those highly coveted, third-world orphans. If that doesn't sound to you like a particularly good idea, well, you'd be right: The film puts the comedian on a fast-track to international incident, showing him blundering through the adoption process by, amongst other faux pas, greeting one kid Jacko-style in facemask and rubber gloves, abandoning another on a mountaintop in order to chase after a hot local and, most death-defying of all, baiting the most fearsome of world powers by trying to crash the Oprah school.

— Dan Persons, HuffPost, June 15, 2010

== Cast ==
- Pauly Shore - Himself

== Production ==
The film was shot in South Africa in 2007 while Pauly Shore had been visiting the country. The idea for the film had come to him during the same visit and he had his crew members flown in to shoot the film. He "storyboarded the entire film in his hotel room, and a casting agent sent along a few “orphans” for the shoot." Adopted itself was then filmed within a period of only a few weeks.
