= Encino Man =

1992 film by Les Mayfield

- Theatrical release poster
- Directed by: Les Mayfield
- Screenplay by: George Zaloom; Shawn Schepps
- Story by: Shawn Schepps
- Produced by: George Zaloom; Hilton A. Green; Michael Rotenberg
- Starring: Sean Astin; Brendan Fraser; Mariette Hartley; Richard Masur; Pauly Shore
- Cinematography: Robert Brinkmann
- Edited by: Michael Kelly; Eric A. Sears
- Music by: J. Peter Robinson
- Production companies: Hollywood Pictures; Touchwood Pacific Partners I; Silver Screen Partners IV
- Distributed by: Buena Vista Pictures Distribution
- Release date: May 22, 1992
- Running time: 88 minutes
- Country: United States
- Language: English
- Budget: $7 million
- Box office: $40.7 million

Encino Man (also known as California Man in Europe) is a 1992 American fantasy comedy film directed by Les Mayfield in his directorial debut. The film stars Sean Astin, with a supporting cast of Brendan Fraser, Mariette Hartley, Richard Masur and Pauly Shore.

In the film, teenagers Dave Morgan and Stoney Brown discover and thaw a frozen caveman they name Linkovich "Link" Chomovsky, who has to adjust to 20th century society while teaching them life lessons of his own.

The film was released on May 22, 1992, by Buena Vista Pictures Distribution (under its Hollywood Pictures label). Despite negative reviews, Encino Man was a box-office success, grossing $40.7 million worldwide on a $7 million budget. Today it is considered a cult classic.

A TV movie sequel, Encino Woman, was released in 1996.

== Plot ==
During the first ice age, a caveman attempts to make fire with his cavewoman girlfriend. An earthquake causes a cave-in that buries them. In 1992, an earthquake awakens Dave Morgan, an Encino teenager who strives to attain popularity in high school. Stoney Brown is an unpopular student who is Dave's best and only friend. Dave is in love with Robyn Sweeney, who was his best friend in grade school. Her boyfriend, Matt Wilson, is a jock who humiliates Dave and Stoney.

One day, while digging a pool in his backyard, Dave discovers the caveman, who is frozen in a gigantic block of ice. He leaves the ice block in the garage with space heaters pointing at it before leaving for school the next morning. The ice melts, releasing the caveman.

When Dave returns home with Stoney, they find muddy hand prints covering the walls and the house in disarray. A beeping smoke alarm leads them to Dave's bedroom, where they discover the caveman attempting to start a fire. He panics upon seeing them and hearing a telephone, but Stoney uses the flame of a lighter to calm him. After bathing and trimming him, Dave names him Linkovich "Link" Chomovsky.

Dave and Stoney get Link some clothes and fool Dave's parents Betty and Larry and sister Teena into thinking he is an Estonian exchange student sent to live with them. They enroll him in school, where Link's bizarre behavior and supreme athletic skills make Dave and Stoney popular by association, allowing Dave to get closer to Robyn, stoking Matt's anger. Soon, Stoney's eccentric attitude influences Link's mannerisms, which causes a rift between Dave and Stoney. Matt starts a fight with Link at a skating rink and becomes more enraged when Robyn leaves him.

During a school field trip to the La Brea Tar Pits, Link grieves after realizing that the cavepeople he knew are all dead. Stoney and Dave reassure him that he is not without friends. During a driver's ed lesson, Link drives away in a car with Dave, Stoney and Robyn before stopping at a dance club.

Dave and Link are arrested after the police follow them. Dismayed by Link's antics and Robyn's desire to go to the prom with Link, Dave tries to abandon him but Stoney reprimands him, leading to a fight between the two. This causes Link to return and break up the fight, leading Dave to apologize.

On prom night, Link is a hit at the party with Robyn as his date, while Dave stays home. Matt breaks into Dave's bedroom and steals Polaroids showing Link is a caveman. As Dave and Stoney pursue Matt and his friends, another earthquake happens. At the prom, Matt exposes Link as a caveman in an attempt to destroy Dave and his reputations, but the student body accepts Link's status. Matt is humiliated, Dave and Robyn make up and the three boys lead the entire prom in an impromptu caveman-like dance with Infectious Grooves providing the music.

After the prom, some of the students visit Dave's house for a pool party, where Dave and Robyn kiss. Meanwhile, Stoney and Link discover breast prints on the slider and mud on the walls of Dave's home. They follow muddy footprints to the bathroom and find Link's girlfriend, who also survived the earthquake during the ice age. He joins her in the bathtub and embraces her happily. They also make her up to look like a modern human.

== Cast ==
- Sean Astin as Dave Morgan
- Brendan Fraser as Linkovich "Link" Chomovsky
- Pauly Shore as Stanley "Stoney" Brown
- Megan Ward as Robyn Sweeney
- Mariette Hartley as Betty Morgan
- Richard Masur as Larry Morgan
- Michael DeLuise as Matt Wilson
- Robin Tunney as Ella Brown
- Rick Ducommun as Mr. Brush
- Patrick Van Horn as Phil
- Dalton James as Will
- Ke Huy Quan as Kim
- Ellen Blain as Teena Morgan
- Esther Scott as Evelyn Mackey
- Michole Briana White as Kathleen
- Rose McGowan as Nora
- Jack Noseworthy as Taylor
- Christian Hoff as Boog
- Sandra Hess as Cave Nug
- Erick Avari as Raji
- Gerry Bednob as Kashmir
- Jeffrey Anderson-Gunter as Bartender
- Infectious Grooves as Themselves
- Richard Montoya as Enrique
- Ric Salinas as Loco
- Herbert Sigüenza as Chuly

== Production ==
Originally, Ben Stiller, Keith Coogan and Jeff Maynard were cast as the three main characters Linkovich "Link" Chomovsky, Stanley "Stoney" Brown and Dave Morgan for a screen test. This was to show that the concept of Encino Man could work, as well as show the studio that Les Mayfield was capable of directing a comedy like this. Pauly Shore later uploaded this screen test on YouTube. Encino Man was directed by Mayfield, a veteran of behind-the-scenes promotional documentaries, making his feature-film debut. The film was shot from December 1991 to February 1992. Filming locations across northern Los Angeles included Los Angeles Mission College in Sylmar and Six Flags Magic Mountain, while the family home was filmed at 7532 Sedgwick Court, West Hills and the minimart scene was shot at 6586 Van Nuys Blvd, Van Nuys.

Shore was known for his show Totally Pauly on MTV and Disney expected this would bring an existing audience to the film. The film tested well with teen audiences and Mayfield thanked Wayne's World, which was released three months before Encino Man, for showing a comedy aimed at this demographic could do well.

Costume designer Marie France decided not to buy clothes; instead, she custom made the wardrobe for the characters of Stoney and Link. For Shore, she took his own unusual style and gave it a younger look. For Brendan Fraser, who stands at 6 feet 3 inches (190 cm), it was a matter of practicality, easier than trying to find the sizes needed, and she dressed him in baggy, knee-length shorts and oversized T-shirts.

== Reception ==
=== Box office ===
The film was a box-office success. The film made $9.9 million in its opening weekend, coming in fourth at the box office. The film went on to earn a total of $40.7 million at the North American box office on a budget of $7.5 million. The film was released in the United Kingdom on September 25, 1992, titled California Man, and opened at number five.

=== Critical response ===
On Rotten Tomatoes, the film has an approval rating of 17% based on 36 reviews, with an average rating of 3.5/10. The website's critical consensus reads: "Encino Man isn't the first unabashedly silly comedy to embrace its stupidity and amass a cult following, but whether or not it works for you will largely be determined by your tolerance for Pauly Shore." On Metacritic, the film has a weighted average score of 25 out of 100 based on 20 critics, indicating "generally unfavorable" reviews. Audiences surveyed by CinemaScore gave the film an average grade of "A" on an A+ to F scale.

On At the Movies, Gene Siskel said he was annoyed by Shore's performance and film's teen movie clichés, and compared it negatively to the authenticity of Bill & Ted's Excellent Adventure and Wayne's World. Siskel's colleague Roger Ebert said he found the film "really dreary and really slow and really uninteresting," lamenting the wasted opportunity to do anything interesting with the Link character. Both critics gave the film a "thumbs down."

Variety also panned the film, saying "Encino Man is a mindless would-be comedy aimed at the younger set. Low-budget quickie is insulting even within its own no-effort parameters". Peter Rainer of the Los Angeles Times wrote: "There are a lot of funny ideas in Encino Man that don't come off because the director, Les Mayfield, and his screenwriter, Shawn Schepps, don't seem to have made up their minds how smart they want to be. A scene like Link freaking out during a visit to the La Brea tar pits museum should count for a lot more than it does here".

Pauly Shore's performance in Encino Man won him the Golden Raspberry Award for Worst New Star at the 13th Golden Raspberry Awards.

== Books ==
A novelization of the film by Les Mayfield was published by Scholastic Books. A tie-in, Stoney's Encino High Notebook, was also published by Hyperion Books. The book is written in character as Stoney, with no author credited.

== Sequels ==
A made-for-television movie sequel, Encino Woman, aired April 20, 1996, on ABC. It takes a different and more feminist approach, parodying the fashion industry and featuring numerous cameos by drag queens. Variety compared it to Paris Is Burning.

Fraser reprised his role as Link for cameo roles in two subsequent Shore films, as a college student in Son in Law and a soldier in In the Army Now, seeming to imply that all three films exist in the same timeline.

According to Shore, in 2022, Disney+ personnel were discussing a potential further sequel with the possibility of Sean Astin, Fraser and him back as their characters.

== In popular culture ==
In Evan Wright's book about the 2003 invasion of Iraq, Generation Kill, Craig Schwetje, the U.S. Marine company commander is nicknamed Encino Man, supposedly for his incompetence. In the 2008 HBO miniseries adaptation of the book, Schwetje is played by Brian Patrick Wade. The South Park second season episode "Prehistoric Ice Man" (1999) was a parody of the film, wherein the boys find a man named Larry (Stan Sawicki), who has been frozen in ice since 1996.

At the 95th Academy Awards, the film was referred to by Jimmy Kimmel in his opening monologue, saying the ceremony is a great night for Brendan Fraser and Ke Huy Quan (nominees and later winners for Best Actor in The Whale and Best Supporting Actor in Everything Everywhere All at Once, respectively) "and a difficult night for Pauly Shore". The film featured a short scene where Fraser and Quan talk to each other. Shore wrote on X that he "loved" the joke about him. Fraser and Quan later reunited backstage at the Academy Awards and reminisced about their work together.

Professional wrestler Chad Gable used Matt Wilson (Michael DeLuise)'s "Shoosh!" line as his signature catchphrase.

== See also ==
- Blast from the Past
- Hibernatus
- Iceman (1984 film)
- "The Resurrection of Jimber-Jaw"
