= Pauly Shore =

American comedian and actor (born 1968)

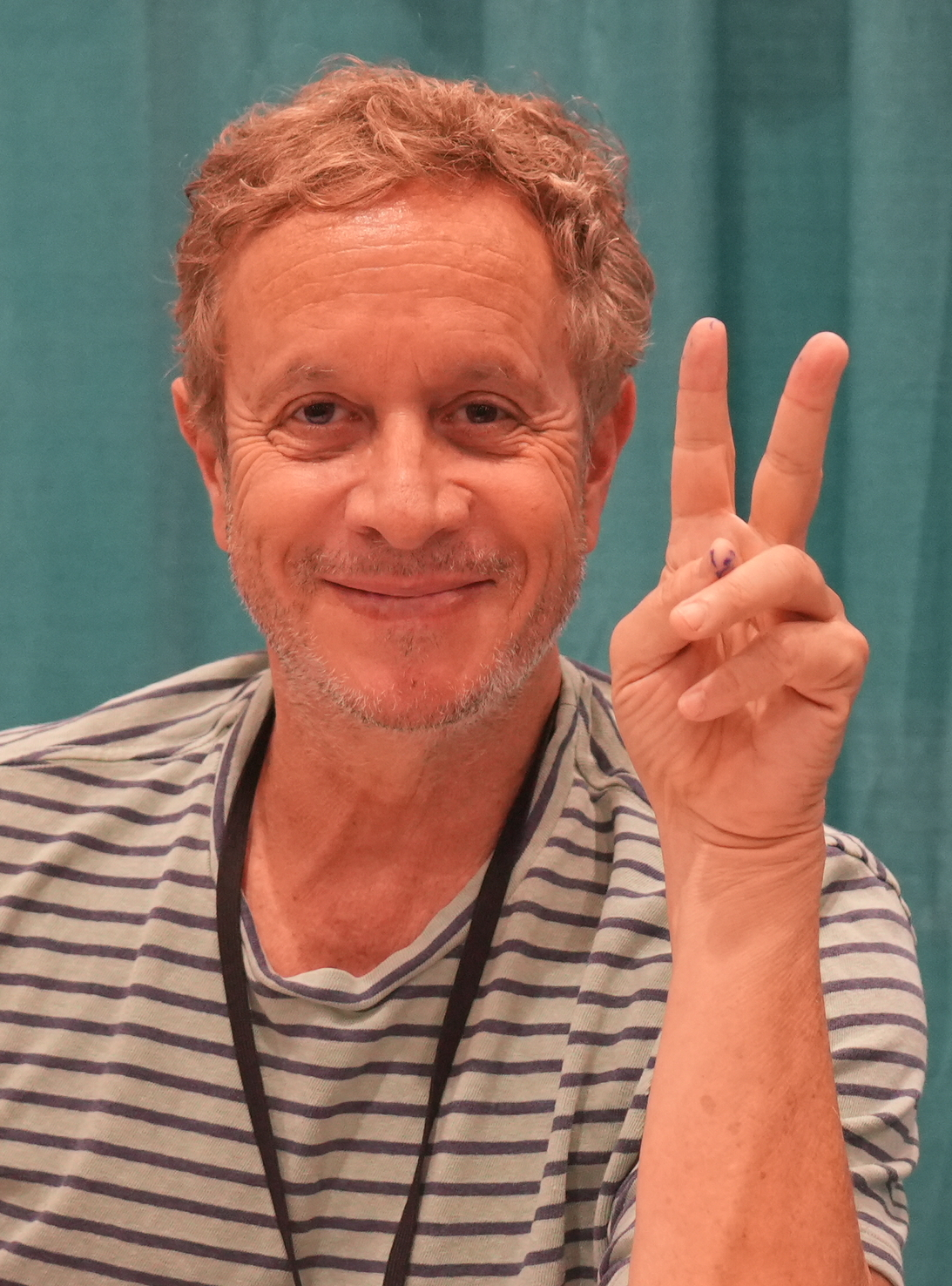
- Shore at GalaxyCon Raleigh in 2024
- Born: Paul Montgomery Shore; February 1, 1968 (age 58); Beverly Hills, California, U.S.
- Other name: The Weasel
- Notable work: Stoney Brown in Encino Man; Crawl in Son in Law; Bud Macintosh in Bio-Dome
- Parent(s): Sammy Shore; Mitzi Shore

Comedy career
- Years active: 1985–present
- Medium: Stand-up, television, film
- Genres: Improvisational comedy, character comedy, surreal humour
- Website: www.paulyshore.com

Paul Montgomery Shore (born February 1, 1968) is an American comedian and actor. He is best known for his performances in several 1990s comedy films. Shore began as a stand-up comedian at the age of 17, before becoming an MTV VJ in 1989. This led to a starring role in the comedy film Encino Man in 1992, which was a modest hit. He followed this with leading man roles, including Son in Law (1993), In the Army Now (1994) and Bio-Dome (1996). Shore provided the voice of Robert "Bobby" Zimuruski in A Goofy Movie (1995) and its direct-to-video sequel, An Extremely Goofy Movie (2000).

He is the son of Mitzi Shore (1930–2018) and Sammy Shore (1927–2019), both of whom owned The Comedy Store, a comedy club based in West Hollywood. Shore also directed a semi-autobiographical mockumentary film, Pauly Shore Is Dead (2003).

== Early life ==
Paul Montgomery Shore was born on February 1, 1968, in Beverly Hills, California, the son of Sammy Shore and Mitzi Shore (née Saidel). Sammy was a comedian. He and Mitzi co-founded The Comedy Store with Rudy De Luca. After Sammy and Mitzi divorced, Mitzi owned and operated the Comedy Store as part of the divorce settlement from 1974 until her death in 2018. Shore was raised Jewish and grew up in Beverly Hills, California. He graduated from Beverly Hills High School in 1986.

== Career ==
=== Stand-up career ===
Inspired by his parents' work in comedy and show business, a 17-year-old Shore made his stand-up debut at the Alley Cat Bistro in Culver City. "Everyone else in school was filling out their SAT applications, but I just passed mine back. I knew I wasn't going to go to college." Shore was mentored by Sam Kinison and opened several of his sets. While touring the comedy club circuit, Shore cultivated an alter ego persona called "The Weasel". "The Weasel" involved Shore speaking in a surfer parlance, heavily peppered with dudespeak slang such as "edged", "melons" and "grinding" as well as his catchphrase, "Hey, BU-DDY."

=== MTV ===
Shore's big break came as an on-air MTV VJ, a position he held from 1989 to 1994. At the height of his MTV fame, Shore had his own show, Totally Pauly, serving as a host on MTV's annual Spring Break parties. He also released a music video, "Lisa, Lisa, the One I Adore". In 1999, Shore reprised his role as the host of MTV's spring break when he guest starred on an episode of King of the Hill.

=== Film career and other highlights ===
In 1992, Shore starred in Encino Man, which was a modest hit. The film's success propelled Shore to star in additional films, albeit increasingly less successful: Son in Law (1993), In the Army Now (1994), Jury Duty (1995), and Bio-Dome (1996). All five films received sharply negative reviews, with the last three each holding a rating below 10% at Rotten Tomatoes. In addition, each of the films grossed less at the box office than the one before. Describing Shore's performances in these films, film critic Roger Ebert wrote, "Shore bypasses all categories to achieve a kind of transcendent fingernails-on-the-blackboard effect." In a 2017 interview with Joe Rogan, Shore blamed Jeffrey Katzenberg and not listening to his managers for the latter films. Shore provided the voice of Robert "Bobby" Zimuruski in A Goofy Movie (1995) and its direct-to-video sequel, An Extremely Goofy Movie (2000).

In 1997, Shore starred in the eponymous TV show Pauly, which was cancelled after five episodes aired. He made a cameo appearance in the American rock band Limp Bizkit music video "N 2 Gether Now" as a pizza deliveryman and a briefer appearance in "Break Stuff". The Golden Raspberry Awards has recognized Shore's film performances several times, awarding him Worst New Star of the Year for Encino Man, Worst Actor of the Year for Bio-Dome, and Worst New Star of the Decade for the 1990s, and nominating him for Worst Actor of the Century (which he lost to Sylvester Stallone).

In 2003, Shore produced, wrote, directed and starred in Pauly Shore Is Dead, a semi-autobiographical mockumentary, and in 2005, starred in the short-lived reality television series Minding the Store. In 2010, Shore starred in Adopted, which sees him traveling to Africa to adopt a child.

In March 2018, Shore appeared as himself in episode 10 of the TV series Alone Together.

In January 2024, following a fan campaign, Shore revealed a teaser for a short film, starring himself as Richard Simmons titled The Court Jester. Simmons released a statement revealing that he did not give permission for the short.

September 2026, fitness & medical publications documented Pauly Shore inviting people into a mobile airstream wood fired sauna and cold plunge challenge off of the streets in Nashville, where the entire spectacle was captured on camera The Sauna King.

Shore starred in the horror short, Remain Calm, written and directed by Jake Lewis (alongside Nick Swardson & Doug Jones, which premiered on YouTube, October 12, 2026.

== Discography ==
Year	Title	Record label
1991	The Future of America	WTG Records
1992	Scraps from the Future	WTG Records/Epic
1993	Son in Law (Original Motion Picture Soundtrack)	Hollywood Records
1994	Pink Diggily Diggily	Priority Records
2000	Hollywood, We've Got a Problem	Landing Patch Records
2024	Crustopolis, Vol. 1 (as Pauly Shore and the Crustys)	Jett Plastic Recordings

== Selected television ==
Year	Title	Role	Notes
1987	21 Jump Street	Kenny Ryan	Season 2 Episode 4 "Two for the Road"
1988	St. Elsewhere	Franky	Season 6, Episode 16 "Down and Out on Beacon Hill"
1989	Rock & Read	Host	
1989	Married... with Children	The Captain	Season 3 Episode 14 "A Three Job, No Income Family"
1989	What's Alan Watching?	Craig	TV pilot, aired February 27, 1989
1990	Totally Pauly	Host	Aired intermittently until 1997
1992	Time Out: The Truth About HIV, AIDS, and You	Himself	
1992	A Tribute to Sam Kinison		
1992	Bobby's World	George	Voice, 7 episodes
1992	Playboy: The Best of Jenny McCarthy	Himself	
1997	Pauly	Pauly Sherman	TV series. Cancelled after five episodes, leaving two unaired.
1997	Playboy: Jenny McCarthy, the Playboy Years	Himself	
1999	King of the Hill	MTV DJ	Voice, episode: "Escape from Party Island"
1999	Fantasy Island	Aaron Filner	Episode: "The Real Thing"
1999	Futurama	Himself	Voice, episode: "The Cryonic Woman"
2005	Minding the Store	Himself	
2007	Entourage	Himself	Episode: “Gotcha”
2011	Pauly Shore's Vegas is My Oyster	Himself	
2012	Pauly Shore's Pauly~Tics	Himself	
2012	Whiskey Business	Nicky Ferelli	
2014	Pauly Shore Stands Alone	Himself	
2015	Randy Cunningham: 9th Grade Ninja	The Kev	Voice, episode: "Club Ninja-dise/To Smell and Back"
2016	Workaholics	Himself	Episode: "Wolves of Rancho"
2017	Star vs. the Forces of Evil	Johnny Blowhole	Voice, episode: "Bounce Lounge"
2017	Hell's Kitchen	Himself	Episode: "Playing Your Cards Right"
2017	Funny You Should Ask	Himself	2 episodes
2018	Alone Together	Himself	
2020	The Comedy Store	Himself	

== Selected filmography ==
Year	Title	Role	Notes
1988	For Keeps	Retro	
1988	18 Again!	Barrett	
1989	Lost Angels	Kid #3	
1989	Phantom of the Mall: Eric's Revenge	Buzz	
1989	Wedding Band	Nicky	
1989	Dream Date	Rudy	
1992	Encino Man	Stanley "Stoney" Brown	
1992	Class Act	Julian Thomas	
1993	Son in Law	Crawl	
1994	In the Army Now	Bones Conway	
1995	A Goofy Movie	Robert "Bobby" Zimuruski	Voice, uncredited
1995	Jury Duty	Thomas B. "Tommy" Collins	
1996	Bio-Dome	Bud Macintosh	
1996	The Curse of Inferno	Chuck Betts	
1997	Casper: A Spirited Beginning	Snivel	
1998	Junket Whore	Himself	
1998	Casper Meets Wendy	The Oracle	
2000	An Extremely Goofy Movie	Robert "Bobby" Zimuruski	Voice
2000	Red Letters	Anthony Griglio	
2000	The Princess and the Barrio Boy	Wesley	
2000	The Bogus Witch Project	Himself	
2001	The Wash	Man in Trunk	
2001	Spooge		
2002	Rebel Fish	Himself/DVD Host	
2003	Pauly Shore Is Dead	Himself/Bucky's Cousin	
2005	My Big Fat Independent Movie	Himself	
2007	Natural Born Komics	Himself	
2009	Opposite Day	Robert Benson	
2010	Adopted	Himself	
2010	Stonerville	Rod Hardbone	
2011	Bucky Larson: Born to Be a Star	AFA Emcee	
2014	Pauly Shore Stands Alone	Himself	
2020	Guest House	Randy Cockfield	
2020	The Little Penguin Pororo's Dinosaur Island Adventure	Mr. Y	Voice
2021	The Little Penguin Pororo's Treasure Island Adventure	Captain Dark	Voice
2022	Pinocchio: A True Story	Pinocchio	Voice, U.S Dub
2024	The Court Jester	Richard Simmons	
2026	The Sauna King	Himself	
2026	Remain Calm	Matt	
