= Son in Law (film) =

1993 film by Steve Rash

- Theatrical release poster
- Directed by: Steve Rash
- Screenplay by: Fax Bahr; Adam Small; Shawn Schepps
- Story by: Patrick J. Clifton; Susan McMartin; Peter M. Lenkov
- Produced by: Peter M. Lenkov; Michael Rotenberg
- Starring: Pauly Shore; Lane Smith; Carla Gugino
- Cinematography: Peter Deming
- Edited by: Dennis M. Hill; Jerry L. Roof
- Music by: Richard Gibbs
- Production company: Hollywood Pictures
- Distributed by: Buena Vista Pictures Distribution
- Release date: July 2, 1993 (United States)
- Running time: 95 minutes
- Language: English
- Budget: $8 million
- Box office: $36.4 million (US/Canada)

Son in Law is a 1993 American comedy film directed by Steve Rash, written by Fax Bahr, Adam Small, and Shawn Schepps, and starring Pauly Shore, Lane Smith and Carla Gugino.

Although it became a box-office success, the film received mixed reviews from critics, but because of a strong fanbase has since become a cult classic.

== Plot ==
18-year-old Rebecca "Becca" Warner, the valedictorian of her high school in a farm town in South Dakota, has been accepted to a college in Los Angeles. On her first day, she and her parents Walter and Connie meet Fred "Crawl" Weasel, resident advisor of Becca's coed dormitory. After they leave, the clash of cultures causes Becca to consider returning home, but Crawl convinces her to give the college a chance. She soon acclimates, cutting and dyeing her hair, dressing in a Californian style, and getting a tattoo of a butterfly on her ankle. When Becca sees that Crawl has nowhere to go when school breaks, she invites him to South Dakota to celebrate Thanksgiving with her family.

When Becca and Crawl arrive in South Dakota, the Warners and Becca's boyfriend Travis are shocked by the changes in Becca. At dinner, Becca realizes that Travis wants to propose marriage to her, and she urges Crawl to speak. Unable to come up with anything off the cuff, Crawl tells them that he has already proposed and she accepted. This upsets Becca's family and Travis, who punches Crawl in the face.

Crawl expresses an interest in farming but bumbles through daily chores, to the amusement of Walter and his farmhand Theo. However, Crawl proves himself as an avid farmer, quickly learning how to perform each task. He also impresses Becca's little brother Zack with his computer skills, and Zack begins to see him as a big brother. He compliments Connie's appearance and helps to bring her out of her shell for Walter. When Walter's father has a heart attack, Crawl performs CPR and earns Walter's trust.

While shopping for clothes, Crawl meets Becca's friend Tracy. Travis apologizes to Crawl for hitting him and invites him to a bachelor party, where Tracy dances for Crawl.

The next morning, Becca finds Crawl and Tracy waking up in the barn and furiously calls off the wedding, but Crawl and Tracy cannot remember what happened. Crawl leaves to head back to L.A. while Travis, who had been seeing Tracy on the side, berates her for behavior the previous night. Tracy finds her car seat left all the way back and discovers a bottle of pills underneath it.

After picking up Crawl, who was attempting to hitchhike, Tracy visits the Warner house to confront Travis and Theo while the Warners are sitting down to Thanksgiving dinner. Theo confesses that they drugged them and that he set them up in the barn. Walter immediately fires Theo. Becca stands up to Travis, and Crawl knocks him down, revealing that he had majored in karate for two semesters.

After Travis and Theo leave, Tracy is invited to sit with the Warners while Walter asks his son-in-law to cut the turkey. Becca tries to speak the truth about Crawl's proposal, but he stops her, saying that they have not decided on a wedding date and need to wait before making the decision, hinting that he intends to legitimately propose to Rebecca and have a proper relationship.

== Cast ==
- Pauly Shore as Fred "Crawl" Weasel
- Carla Gugino as Rebecca "Becca" Warner, Crawl's love interest later fiancée
- Lane Smith as Walter Warner Jr., Rebecca's father
- Cindy Pickett as Connie Warner, Rebecca's mother
- Mason Adams as Walter Warner Sr., Walter's father and Rebecca's paternal grandfather
- Patrick Renna as Zack Warner, Rebecca's younger brother
- Dennis Burkley as Theo, Walter's farmhand
- Dan Gauthier as Travis, Rebecca's boyfriend
- Tiffani-Amber Thiessen as Tracy, Rebecca's best friend
- Adam Goldberg as Indian
- Flea as tattoo artist
- Brendan Fraser as Linkovich "Link" Chomovsky (reprising his role of Encino Man in a cameo appearance)

== Production ==
After Encino Man, Shore was considering a project with New Line Cinema, but was heavily pressured by Disney chairman Jeffrey Katzenberg to stay with Disney and make Son in Law.

== Promotions ==
The promotional poster for the film is a parody of the painting American Gothic. The opening title sequence and graduation ceremony scene were filmed at Wasco High School in Wasco, California.

To promote the film, MTV ran a contest to marry Pauly Shore in Las Vegas. The contest attracted 25,000 entrants and was won by Tanya Cinotti of Salisbury, Massachusetts, who also won four days in Vegas, food, time with Shore, a bumblebee ring and a yo-yo that lights up. Though, on July 2, 1993, there was a ceremony, no marriage certificates were signed.

== Reception ==
On the review aggregator website Rotten Tomatoes, 32% of 22 critics' reviews are positive, with an average rating of 4.1/10. The website's consensus reads: "While there may be some mild culture clash yucks to be had for those who enjoy Pauly Shore's shtick, this Son-In-Law is too obnoxious to be worthy of bringing home to your family." In the Los Angeles Times, reviewer Michael Wilmington suggested that the film "... tries to pretend that it’s about tolerance: a kind of Guess Who’s Coming to Dinner about anti-L.A. freak bigotry". He also criticized the film's premise:

Son-in-Law suggests that somebody like Crawl would be as weird as a lunar being to the Midwestern Warners. That isn't so. Because of TV and the movies, L.A. subcultures are the ones everyone knows about. ... In any town within reach of cable TV, the teen-agers would not only recognize a Pauly, there might be imitation Paulys at the high school.

In the United States and Canada, the film grossed $36.4 million. By the end of 1993, it had grossed $4.6 million internationally.
