= List of Chapo Trap House episodes =

American left-wing political and humor podcast

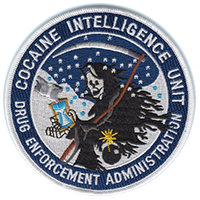
The logo used by Chapo Trap House is an embroidered patch of the Drug Enforcement Administration's Cocaine Intelligence Unit

Chapo Trap House is an American politics and humor podcast hosted by Will Menaker, Matt Christman, Felix Biederman, and Amber A'Lee Frost, and is produced by Chris Wade. The podcast became known for its irreverent leftist commentary in the run-up to the 2016 US presidential election.

The first episode of Chapo Trap House was released on March 13, 2016. As of February 17, 2025, 1016 episodes have been released. The podcast is updated several times weekly.

== Episodes ==
=== 2021 ===
No. overall	Given No. (Note: Chapo Trap House episodes are given an official number, including ".5" numbering used for early premium episodes and unnumbered "bonus" episodes. The "given number" column shows the episode numbers designated in the show title, while the "number overall" column reflects the total number of all episodes.)	Title	Guests	Original release date	Notes
552	486	"Eel Dealings"	—	January 5, 2021	—
553	487	"Capitol Building Autonomous Zone"	Will Sommer	January 8, 2021	Premium; Sommer's 6th episode
554	488	"PermabannedPresident45"	—	January 11, 2021	—
555	489	"I Heard You Paint Bathrooms"	—	January 14, 2021	Premium
556	490	"Meet Me in NEOM"	Séamus Malekafzali	January 18, 2021	Malekafzali's 2nd episode
557	—	"BONUS: Will Goes to the Mayor"	David Osit	January 20, 2021	—
558	491	"Come On Man"	—	January 21, 2021	Premium
559	492	"Marshmallow Fluff"	—	January 25, 2021	—
560	493	"Movies for the Blind"	Jesse Hawken	January 28, 2021	Premium
561	494	"The Lincoln Grooming Project"	Max Palma, Ben Mora, and Mike Recine	February 1, 2021	Palma's 3rd episode, Mora's 3rd episode, Recine's 3rd episode
562	495	"Young Shooters"	Podcast About List	February 4, 2021	Premium; review of the film Run Hide Fight
563	496	"Wassup"	—	February 8, 2021	—
564	497	"Poppy, Part 2"	—	February 11, 2021	Premium; a history episode, the second part of a biography of George H. W. Bush
565	498	"Child FACTS Credit"	Matt and Liz Bruenig	February 15, 2021	Matt Bruenig's 4th episode, Liz Bruenig's 3rd episode
566	499	"So Icey"	Libby Watson	February 18, 2021	Premium; Watson's 8th episode
567	500	"The Friends We Made Along The Way"	James Adomian (as Mike Lindell), Josh Androsky, Trevor Beaulieu, Brace Belden, Daniel Bessner, Matt V. Brady, Alex Branson, Derek Davison, Liz Franczak, Tim Heidecker, Andrew Hudson, Don Hughes, Brendan James, Max Palma, Brett Payne, Brian Quinby, Brandon Wardell, Jack Wagner, QAnon Anonymous, the Trillbillies, @dril and Derek Estevez-Olsen from Truthpoint, and Aaron, Tom, Chet, and Michael from Chapo FYM	February 22, 2021	500th episode special; Adomian's 23rd episode, Androsky's 3rd episode, Beaulieu's 6th episode, Belden's 8th episode, Branson's 2nd episode, Brady's 8th episode, Davison's 16th episode, Franczak's 4th episode, Heidecker's 6th episode, Hughes' 6th episode, James' 18th episode, Palma's 4th episode, Payne's 4th episode, Quinby's 8th episode, Wardell's 3rd episode, Wagner's 4th episode, the Trillbillies' 2nd episode, Aaron from Chapo FYM's 2nd episode, Tom from Chapo FYM's 2nd episode
568	501	"Sundown Empire"	Derek Davison and Daniel Bessner	February 25, 2021	Premium; Davison's 17th episode, Bessner's 4th episode
569	502	"Units of One"	Adam Curtis	March 1, 2021	Curtis' 2nd episode
570	—	"Bonus: PMC Shopping"	Catherine Liu	March 3, 2021	—
571	503	"The Charliamentarian"	Steven Donziger	March 4, 2021	Premium; Donziger's 2nd episode; interview portion unlocked 3/8/21
572	504	"Me Me Madness"	—	March 8, 2021	Review of the film Me You Madness
573	505	"Gooner Rushmore"	Adam Friedland	March 11, 2021	Premium; Friedland's 9th episode
574	506	"John Smick"	—	March 15, 2021	Review of the film Stars and Strife
575	507	"Marvel's The Irish-Men"	—	March 18, 2021	Premium
576	508	"Questions for the Boys"	Katherine Krueger	March 23, 2021	Krueger's 7th episode
577	509	"Your Arms Too Short to MotherBox with God"	—	March 25, 2021	Premium
578	510	"Stuck in the Middle With You"	—	March 29, 2021	—
579	—	"Bonus: Will Discusses Biden's Immigration Plan with Karina Moreno"	Karina Moreno	March 31, 2021	Bonus Episode; Moreno's 3rd episode
580	511	"In This Chapo Trap House, We Believe..."	Thomas Frank	April 1, 2021	Premium
581	512	"Through the Dark Gaet"	Ken Klippenstein	April 5, 2021	—
582	—	"Bonus: Will Talks Idaho Medicaid Expansion Documentary"	Jim Kamoosi and Laura Kamoosi	April 8, 2021	—
583	513	"The Inebriated Past, Part 9: Beast Mode"	—	April 8, 2021	Premium
584	514	"Cocaine Nights"	Adam McKay	April 13, 2021	McKay's 2nd episode
585	515	"The Silent Screen"	—	April 15, 2021	Premium; review of the film Roe v. Wade (film)
586	516	"Time Cuba"	Brendan James and Noah Kulwin	April 20, 2021	James' 19th episode, Kulwin's 4th episode
587	517	"A Million Beautiful Little Things"	Jacob Bacharach	April 22, 2021	Premium; Bacharach's 4th episode
588	518	"Gangs of Los Angeles"	Cerise Castle	April 26, 2021	—
589	519	"The Leper Colony"	Alex Nichols	April 30, 2021	Premium; Nichols' 7th episode
590	520	"We Went To A Zoo"	Zack Kopplin	May 4, 2021	—
591	521	"A Good Man Is Hard To Find"	Dan Boeckner	May 6, 2021	Premium; Boeckner's 2nd episode
592	522	"American Junkie"	—	May 11, 2021	—
593	523	"A Time To Kill"	Steven Donziger	May 13, 2021	Premium; Donziger's 3rd episode
594	—	"BONUS: Steven Donziger’s Case Goes To Trial"	Steven Donziger	May 14, 2021	Excerpt from episode 523, published separately as bonus episode
595	524	"Kush Aliens are Invading Earth"	—	May 17, 2021	—
596	—	"BONUS: Focus on Palestine"	Mohammad Alsaafin	May 13, 2021	—
597	525	"Secret Wars"	—	May 20, 2021	Premium
598	526	"Free Parking"	Brace Belden and Liz Franczak	May 25, 2021	Belden's 9th episode, Franczak's 5th episode
599	527	"Can I Borrow a Feeling?"	Sarah Squirm	May 28, 2021	Premium; Review of the film Equilibrium (film)
600	528	"Pacific Nights"	—	May 31, 2021	—
601	529	"Friendscape Navigator"	—	June 4, 2021	Premium
602	530	"Auspicious Dragons"	—	June 7, 2021	—
603	531	"Festival Internationale"	Palma, Ben Mora, and Jacques Gonsoulin	June 10, 2021	Premium; Palma's 5th episode, Mora's 4th episode
604	532	"The Power of the Dog"	—	June 15, 2021	—
605	533	"CBT War"	Matt Karp	June 17, 2021	Premium; Karp's 4th episode
606	534	"Cranks For Thee"	—	June 21, 2021	—
607	535	"Small Worthless Pockets"	—	June 24, 2021	Premium
608	536	"In The Bunker"	—	June 28, 2021	—
609	537	"Live and Let Pie"	Tom Scharpling	July 1, 2021	Premium
610	538	"100% Gordon"	—	July 5, 2021	—
611	539	"Rap Genious"	Gangsta Boo	July 9, 2021	Premium
612	540	"It's Coming Rome"	Patrick Wyman	July 12, 2021	Wyman's 2nd Episode
613	541	"Bay of Pitbulls"	Brendan James and Noah Kulwin	July 15, 2021	Premium; James' 20th episode, Kulwin's 5th episode
614	542	"The Oopsie Report"	Derek Davison and Daniel Bessner	July 19, 2021	Davison's 18th episode, Bessner's 5th episode
615	543	"Cuck Rifle Coffee"	—	July 22, 2021	Premium
616	544	"Hit Me With Your Best Shot"	—	July 26, 2021	—
617	545	"We Feel Like Shit"	Bryan Quinby	July 29, 2021	Premium; Quinby's 9th episode; review of the documentary Woodstock 99: Peace, Love, and Rage
618	546	"MyPillow Guy, MyPillow Guy and Me"	—	August 2, 2021	—
619	547	"Dracula Party"	David Dayen	August 5, 2021	Premium
620	548	"Just Kids from New York"	—	August 9, 2021	—
621	549	"Naval Chapo Investigative Service"	—	August 12, 2021	Premium
622	550	"Sweet L of Liberty"	—	August 16, 2021	—
623	551	"Now Who Wants Ice Cream?"	—	August 21, 2021	Premium
624	552	"The Nephew Gap"	—	August 23, 2021	—
625	553	"#JackAnon"	—	August 27, 2021	Premium
626	554	"Junkyard of Empires"	—	August 31, 2021	—
627	555	"Bad Land"	Jeff Stein	September 2, 2021	Premium
628	556	"Sperm Jack City"	Dan Boeckner	September 6, 2021	Boeckner's 3rd episode
629	557	"The Inebriated Past 10: Mormons, pt. 1"	—	September 9, 2021	Premium
630	558	"9/11 Era, Pt. 1: The Pussification of the Western Male"	—	September 14, 2021	—
631	559	"9/11 Era, Pt. 2: You Can Not Yell At Me If I Am Crying"	—	September 16, 2021	Premium
632	560	"Future Histories"	Kim Stanley Robinson	September 14, 2021	Robinson's 2nd episode
633	—	"Bonus: Interview with India Walton, Candidate for Mayor of Buffalo"	India Walton	September 22, 2021	—
634	561	"This Podcast is Fuckin’ Golden"	Rod Blagojevich	September 23, 2021	Premium
635	562	"Goodbye Horses"	—	September 28, 2021	—
636	—	"BONUS: Steven Donziger to be Sentenced"	Steven Donziger	September 30, 2021	Donziger's 4th episode
637	563	"Cry Chapo"	—	September 30, 2021	Premium; Review of the film Cry Macho
638	564	"On Sinema, At The Sinema"	Kristinn Hrafnsson	October 4, 2021	—
639	565	"The Many Saints of Chapo: A Chapo Trap House Episode"	Pod Yourself a Gun	October 8, 2021	Premium; Review of the film The Many Saints of Newark
640	566	"Dopeness Report"	—	October 12, 2021	—
641	567	"Friend or Fode"	—	October 14, 2021	Premium
642	—	"Bonus: Teamsters Deliver The Goods 2"	Matt Maini	October 15, 2021	Maini's 2nd episode
643	568	"Root Cause"	—	October 18, 2021	—
644	569	"Consent Factory Simulator"	Trevor Strunk	October 21, 2021	Premium
645	570	"Deere John Letter"	Jonah Furman	October 25, 2021	—
646	571	"Welcome to the MentalVerse"	—	October 28, 2021	Premium
647	572	"The McGloughstein Group"	Daniel Bessner	November 1, 2021	Bessner's 6th episode
648	573	"Mung & Tung"	—	November 4, 2021	Premium
649	574	"Bovine University"	—	November 8, 2021	—
650	575	"Eternal Affairs"	—	November 11, 2021	Premium; Review of the film Eternals
651	576	"The Wonder Twins"	—	November 15, 2021	—
652	577	"The Queen is Dead"	—	November 18, 2021	Premium
653	578	"Assassination Day"	Oliver Stone and Aaron Good	November 22, 2021	—
654	579	"Friendsgiving Hits Different!"	Hugo Soto-Martinez	November 25, 2021	Premium
655	580	"The Prisoner"	—	November 29, 2021	—
656	581	"Brother’s Creeper"	Mike Recine	December 2, 2021	Premium; Recine's 4th episode
657	582	"Heaven: Out of Order"	Slavoj Žižek	December 6, 2021	Žižek's 3rd episode
658	—	"Bonus: G Max Update"	Brace Belden and Liz Franczak	December 7, 2021	Belden's 10th episode, Franczak's 6th episode
659	583	"Hotel Room Shark Tank"	—	December 10, 2021	Premium
660	584	"Let’s Fuck Brandon"	—	December 14, 2021	—
661	585	"Live from Brooklyn: The Daughters' Meatballs"	—	December 17, 2021	Premium; Live show from Brooklyn, New York
662	586	"Christmas in Heaven"	Daniel Bessner	December 20, 2021	Bessner's 7th episode
663	587	"Hindsight 20/21"	—	December 23, 2021	Premium
664	588	"Kill Bill"	Stavros Halkias	December 28, 2021	Halkias's 7th episode
665	589	"Rise of the Unblooded: Curse of the Mad King Job, Part 1"	DM Patches, Jack Walden, James Adomian (various roles)	December 30, 2021	Premium; Adomian's 24th episode
666	—	"BONUS: Amber Interview Paul Prescod, Candidate for PA Senate"	Paul Prescod	December 31, 2021	—

=== 2022 ===
No. overall	Given No.	Title	Guests	Original release date	Notes
667	590	"ThankMedical"	Andrew Hudson	January 3, 2022	Hudson's 2nd episode
668	591	"Rise of the Unblooded: Curse of the Mad King Job, Part 2"	DM Patches, Branson Reese	January 6, 2022	Premium; DM Patches's 2nd episode
669	592	"The Beard"	—	January 10, 2022	—
670	593	"Liberal Drill Team"	—	January 13, 2022	Premium
671	594	"Adult Roller Coaster"	—	January 17, 2022	—
672	595	"Ordinary Fucking People"	—	January 20, 2022	Premium
673	596	"Take this job…and Love It!"	—	January 24, 2022	—
674	597	"Wife Life"	—	January 27, 2022	Premium
675	598	"More Pods About Streaming and Books"	Steven Donziger	January 31, 2022	Donziger's 5th episode
676	599	"The Inebriated Past 11 - Mormons, pt. 2: Polygamy Without the ‘Polyg’"	—	February 3, 2022	Premium
677	600	"We Fight for China"	—	February 7, 2022	Review of the films Wolf Warrior and Wolf Warrior 2
678	601	"Convoy"	Dan Boeckner	February 11, 2022	Premium
679	602	"Crypto Bowl"	—	February 14, 2022	—
680	603	"Gone Ape"	Mike Isaac	February 17, 2022	Premium
681	604	"The Quiz That Makes You Old"	Srećko Horvat	February 21, 2022	—
682	605	"Foreign Policy: The Wire Edition"	Derek Davison	February 24, 2022	Premium
683	606	"Eldenphant Ring"	—	February 28, 2022	—
684	607	"Live From the South: Chapo Went Down to Georgia"	Tarence and Tom of the Trillbilly Worker's Party podcast, Walton Goggins	March 4, 2022	Premium. Recorded during live shows in Atlanta, GA and Nashville, TN
685	608	"The World's Mack"	—	March 7, 2022	—
686	609	"Mayors Just Wanna Have Fun"	—	March 10, 2022	Premium
687	610	"Live at SXSW: Pod Tank"	—	March 15, 2022	Recorded during live show in Austin, TX
688	611	"Rise of the Unblooded: Curse of the Mad King Job, Part 3"	DM Patches	March 17, 2022	Premium. DM Patches's 3rd episode
689	612	"Half Baked"	—	March 21, 2022	—
690	613	"Rise of the Unblooded: Curse of the Mad King Job, Part 4"	DM Patches	March 24, 2022	Premium. DM Patches's 4th episode
691	—	"Bonus: Teamsters Deliver the Goods 3"	—	March 26, 2022	—
692	614a	"Best of Texas Live: Poppy, Part 3"	—	March 28, 2022	Recorded during live shows in Dallas, TX and Houston, TX. Published as two separate episodes but noted by producer Chris Wade as consisting of a single episode
693	614b	"Best of Texas Live: The Secret Uncles feat. Pendejo Time"	Jake and Thomas from the Pendejo Time podcast	March 28, 2022	Recorded during a live show in Houston, TX. Published as two separate episodes but noted by producer Chris Wade as consisting of a single episode
694	615	"It's Not Funny"	—	March 31, 2022	Premium
695	—	"Bonus: Taking Accountability"	Katherine Krueger, Amber Rollo, Molly Mary O'Brien	April 1, 2022	Premium; April Fool's Day special; Krueger's 8th episode
696	—	"Bonus: Opiate Whack-a-Mole"	Zachary Siegel	April 4, 2022	Premium
697	616	"Living Vampires"	—	April 4, 2022	—
698	617	"Bonus: Smile Factory"	Chris Smalls	April 7, 2022	Premium
699	618	"Bonus: Z Whispers"	—	April 11, 2022	—
700	619	"Terrence Malick Voters"	—	April 14, 2022	Premium
701	620	"Beltway Phoenix at the Midterms of Madness"	Dave Weigel	April 18, 2022	Weigel's 2nd episode
702	621	"Live from Golgotha"	Adam Friedland	April 21, 2022	Premium; Friedland's 10th episode
703	622	"Hip Priest"	Podcast About List	April 25, 2022	Podcast About List's 2nd episode; review of the film Father Stu
704	623	"Cathedral of the Deep"	—	April 28, 2022	Premium
705	624	"Valhalla Whining"	—	May 2, 2022	Review of the film The Northman
706	625	"Champagne Cousins"	—	May 5, 2022	Premium
707	626	"Simian Slurp"	Ben McKenzie	May 9, 2022	—
708	627	"Painted Worlds"	—	May 12, 2022	Premium
709	628	"Real Detective"	Nick Bryant	May 16, 2022	—
710	629	"Night at the Opera"	Tim Heidecker	May 19, 2022	Premium; Heidecker's 7th episode
711	630	"Full Stomach, Heavy Heart, Will Lose"	—	May 23, 2022	—
712	—	"Bonus: Dream of Californilection"	Josh Androsky	May 25, 2022	Androsky's 4th episode
713	631	"Uncut Hosts"	Molly Lambert	May 26, 2022	Premium
714	632	"They Droop Horses, Don't They?"	—	May 31, 2022	—
715	633	"Here They Come to Snuff the Rooster"	American Prestige	June 2, 2022	Premium; Davison's 19th episode, Bessner's 8th episode; review of the film Top Gun: Maverick
716	634	"Feelin' Feinstein!"	—	June 6, 2022	—
717	635	"Total Recall"	—	June 9, 2022	Premium
718	636	"Fox News"	Stavros Halkias	June 13, 2022	Halkias's 8th episode
719	637	"De-evolution is Real"	Jerry Casale	June 16, 2022	Premium
720	638	"Real Matt & Felix Hours"	—	June 21, 2022	—
721	639	"Two Dicks, One Coup"	Jefferson Morley	June 23, 2022	Premium
722	640	"Roe Wasn't Burnt in a Day"	—	June 28, 2022	—
723	641	"Fourth Meal Reich"	—	June 30, 2022	Premium
724	642	"The Dinner Party"	—	July 5, 2022	—
725	643	"Are Boris"	Ollie Vargas	July 7, 2022	Premium; Vargas's 2nd episode
726	644	"Hunter Gatherer"	—	July 11, 2022	—
727	645	"Cider House Rules for Life"	John Early	July 14, 2022	Premium
728	646	"LIV Strong"	PFT Commenter	July 18, 2022	PFT Commenter's 2nd episode
729	647	"The Pink Stuff"	—	July 21, 2022	Premium
730	648	"No More Targets"	Brendan James and Noah Kulwin	July 25, 2022	James' 21st episode, Kulwin's 6th episode
731	649	"Face Race"	—	July 28, 2022	Premium
732	650	"Hammer Time"	Brace Belden	August 1, 2022	Belden's 11th episode
733	651	"The Inebriated Past 12: Jesus' Brother"	—	August 4, 2022	Premium
734	652	"Live in Portland: Is America Burger?"	Bill Oakley	August 8, 2022	Oakley's 2nd episode
735	653	"Burble, Burble, Toil and Trouble"	—	August 11, 2022	Premium
736	654	"Tossin' the Pigskin"	The Trillbillies	August 15, 2022	The Trillbillies' 3rd episode
737	655	"In Too Deep"	Aaron Good	August 18, 2022	Premium, Good's 2nd episode
738	656	"Bug Chasers"	—	August 22, 2022	—
739	—	"Bonus: Exit Through the Gas Chamber"	Jerry Stahl	August 24, 2022	—
740	657	"Hustler's University"	—	August 25, 2022	Premium
741	658	"Felix's Video"	—	August 29, 2022	—
742	659	"The Transmigration of John Dolan"	John Dolan	September 1, 2022	Premium; Dolan's 3rd episode
743	660	"The Special Master"	—	September 6, 2022	—
744	661	"My Son, My Son What Have Ye Done"	—	September 8, 2022	Premium; review of the film "My Son Hunter"
745	662	""The Queen" (2006)"	—	September 12, 2022	—
746	—	"Bonus: Triple Shot of Starbucks Workers"	—	September 14, 2022	—
747	663	"Death Comedy Jam"	Kath Krueger	September 16, 2022	Premium; Krueger's 9th episode; review of the docuseries Gutsy
748	664	"Chapo Control to Major Tom"	Tom Myers	September 20, 2022	—
749	665	"Beltway Phoenix: Total Brandonization"	Dave Weigel	September 23, 2022	Premium; Weigel's 3rd episode
750	666	"Chapo Goes to Hell"	Henry Zebrowski, Derek Estevez-Olsen & @dril, James Adomian	September 27, 2022	Estevez-Olsen's 2nd episode, @dril's 2nd episode, Adomian's 25th episode
751	667	"Go In Dry"	Séamus Malekafzali	September 29, 2022	Premium; Malekafzali's 3rd episode
752	668	"In the Navy"	—	October 4, 2022	Review of the film "Battleship"
753	669	"In The Name of the Father"	Katie Halper	October 6, 2022	Premium; Halper's 2nd episode
754	670	"The Ye Imperium"	—	October 10, 2022	—
755	671	"The Inebriated Past 13: So Far From God"	Matt Karp	October 13, 2022	Premium; Karp's 5th episode
756	672	"Smiles Per Minute"	—	October 17, 2022	—
757	673	"Kill This Cat"	Premium	October 20, 2022	—
758	674	"Stew for Demons"	—	October 24, 2022	—
759	675	"Demolition Them"	Girl God	October 28, 2022	Premium
760	676	"Agony Uncles"	—	November 1, 2022	—
761	677	"Better to Reign in Hellsite"	Katherine Krueger, Amber Rollo	November 4, 2022	Premium; Krueger's 10th episode, Rollo's 2nd episode
762	678	"For Whom The Balls Tan"	Julian Feeld, Annie Kelly	November 8, 2022	—
763	679	"Jesters In Control: Red Wank"	—	November 11, 2022	Premium
764	680	"Chapo Blue"	—	November 14, 2022	—
765	681	"Underworld: Rise of the Dybbuks"	—	November 17, 2022	Premium
766	682	"Longspermism"	—	November 21, 2022	—
767	683	"Scran Report: Turkey Barm"	David Roth	November 25, 2022	Premium; Roth's 7th episode
768	684	"Chapo Victims Unit"	—	November 28, 2022	—
769	685	"Fail Whale"	Ben McKenzie	December 1, 2022	Premium; McKenzie's 2nd episode
770	—	"BONUS: Will Talks to Rail Workers"	—	December 4, 2022	—
771	686	"AI Can't Get You Garfield"	Ryan Broderick, James Adomian (as Elon Musk)	December 6, 2022	Adomian's 26th episode
772	687	"Otto von Toontown"	—	December 8, 2022	Premium
773	688	"Black Site Safe Space"	—	December 12, 2022	—
774	689	"Gods and Munsters"	Jefferson Morley	December 15, 2022	Premium; Morley's 2nd episode
775	690	"Recovery Side Quest"	TrueAnon	December 19, 2022	Belden's 12th episode; Franczak's 7th episode
776	691	"The Santos Clause"	—	December 22, 2022	Premium
777	692	"Lindy King"	—	December 26, 2022	Review of Tulsa King
778	693	"Chapo on Broadway"	Tim Heidecker, Stavros Halkias, Katherine Krueger, 95 Bulls, Donzii	December 29, 2022	Premium; Fall Tour compilation; Heidecker's 8th episode; Halkias' 9th episode; Krueger's 11th episode

=== 2023 ===
No. overall	Given No.	Title	Guests	Original release date	Notes
779	694	"Tulkun King"	—	January 2, 2023	Review of the film Avatar: The Way of Water
780	695	"Lucky Number Kevin"	—	January 5, 2023	Premium
781	696	"Meet the Schlapps"	Ben Mora and Hesse Deni	January 9, 2023	Mora's 5th episode
782	697	"The Lion’s Den"	Mohammad Alsaafin	January 12, 2023	Premium; Alsaafin's 2nd episode
783	698	"Lego-Masters Break Out"	Bryan Quinby	January 17, 2023	Quinby's 10th episode
784	699	"The Talented Mr. Santos"	—	January 19, 2023	Premium
785	700	"Shine On You Crazy…"	—	January 23, 2023	—
786	701	"Ordinary Victims"	Kath Krueger	January 26, 2023	Premium; Krueger's 12th episode
787	702	"Don’t Worry Be Happy"	—	January 30, 2023	—
788	703	"New Wave Hookers"	—	February 2, 2023	Premium
789	704	"Time for Some Game Theory"	Bomani Jones	February 6, 2023	—
790	705	"Turd of the Union"	—	February 9, 2023	Premium
791	706	"Arrival"	—	February 13, 2023	—
792	—	"BONUS: Ohio Toxic Train Disaster"	David Sirota	February 15, 2023	Sirota's 2nd episode
793	707	"Soy New World"	Ben Clarkson and Matt Bors	February 16, 2023	Premium
794	708	"Sydney 9000"	—	February 20, 2023	—
795	709	"Way Down in the Pain Hole"	—	February 23, 2023	Premium
796	710	"I Believe Mole Children Are Our Future"	Will Sommer	February 27, 2023	Sommer's 7th episode
797	711	"Bayesian Prior Movers"	Jacob Bacharach	March 3, 2023	Premium; Bacharach's 5th episode
798	712	"Everything Mystical"	Brandon Wardell and Jamel Johnson	March 6, 2023	Wardell's 3rd episode
799	—	"Bonus: MOVIE MINDSET OSCARS PREVIEW"	Hesse Deni	March 9, 2023	Deni's 2nd episode
800	713	"NO MORE BULLSHIT! (Economy Edition)"	Richard D. Wolff	March 9, 2023	Premium; Wolff's 2nd episode
801	714	"McNally Jackin’"	—	March 13, 2023	—
802	715	"Xi Jinping 3rd Term Celebratory Podcast Global News Report"	Derek Davison	March 16, 2023	Premium; Davison's 20th episode
803	—	"Bonus: L.A. Teachers’ Strike"	Betsy and Gloria Gallardo (teachers)	March 19, 2023	TBA
804	716	"The Trump-Steak Redemption"	Ike Barinholtz	March 20, 2023	Barinholtz's 3rd episode
805	717	"WFH"	Libby Watson	March 24, 2023	Premium; Watson's 9th episode
806	718	"The View"	Norman Finkelstein	March 28, 2023	—
807	719	"INDICATED!"	—	March 30, 2023	Premium
808	720	"The Demon Way in Hell"	Josh Cohen (@ettingermentum)	April 4, 2023	—
809	721	"Catholic Cemetery Podcast (A Podcast of the Catholic Cemetery Conference and Magazine)"	Kath Krueger	April 6, 2023	Premium; Krueger's 13th episode
810	722	"Night At The Museum 2: Battle for Camp Gettintop"	—	April 14, 2023	—
811	723	"The Pentagon Discords"	—	April 14, 2023	Premium
812	724	"Pipe Lines....Blow Awaaaaay"	How to Blow Up a Pipeline	April 17, 2023	—
813	725	"Bang! Bus"	Dave Infante	April 20, 2023	Premium
814	726	"Cruising"	Lauren Oyler	April 24, 2023	—
815	727	"Hot Boy Summer"	—	April 28, 2023	Premium
816	728	"Mighty Men"	—	May 1, 2023	—
817	729	"Forget Me Not"	—	May 4, 2023	Premium
818	730	"The Man Who Would Be King"	—	May 8, 2023	—
819	—	"BONUS: What's at Stake in the WGA Writers' Strike"	—	May 11, 2023	—
820	731	"The Truth Cube"	—	May 11, 2023	Premium
821	732	"Marinating Melvin"	—	May 15, 2023	Review of the TV series Ted Lasso
822	733	"Open Worlds"	Josh Sawyer	May 19, 2023	Premium
823	734	"I Feel Like White Gladis"	—	May 23, 2023	—
824	735	"The Termronator"	—	May 25, 2023	Premium
825	736	"Work Will Set Your TV"	—	May 30, 2023	—
826	737	"Money 4 Sale"	—	June 1, 2023	Premium
827	738	"They Smile In Your Face"	Corey Robin	June 5, 2023	—
828	739	"Greatsword of Artorias"	—	June 8, 2023	Premium
829	740	"Crank About Creeping"	Ben Terris	June 12, 2023	—
830	741	"Tom Fitton's Stanky Swankhouse"	—	June 15, 2023	Premium
831	742	"Sluts For Rudy"	—	June 20, 2023	—
832	743	"Time Colosseum"	—	June 22, 2023	Premium
833	744	"People Who Died"	—	June 26, 2023	—
834	745	"Everything Wrong Was Good"	Matt Hongoltz-Hetling	June 29, 2023	Premium
835	746	"Gordian, Not!"	—	July 4, 2023	—
836	747	"Make 'em Say Ugh"	—	July 6, 2023	Premium
837	748	"Slave Stealers, LLC"	—	July 11, 2023	—
838	749	"Cajun Conspiracy: The Roux Gambit"	Hesse Deni, Jacques Gonsoulin, and Ben Mora from the Seeking Derangements podcast	July 14, 2023	Premium, Mora's 6th episode, Deni's 3rd episode, Gonsoulin's 2nd episode
839	750	"Hungwy Man"	—	July 17, 2023	—
840	751	"A Bronx Tale"	—	July 20, 2023	Premium
841	—	"BONUS: Go Team Venture!"	Doc Hammer & Jackson Publick	July 20, 2023	—
842	752	"Guy Stuff"	—	July 23, 2023	—
843	753	"Gurnee Nights"	—	July 27, 2023	Premium
844	754	"Sugar Spotters"	David Roth	July 31, 2023	Roth's 8th episode
845	755	"Dignity Search 2023"	Kath Krueger	August 3, 2023	Premium; Krueger's 14th episode
846	756	"Call Your Mother"	Adam Friedland	August 8, 2023	Friedland's 11th episode
847	757	"There Is No Self To Kale"	—	August 10, 2023	Premium
848	758	"The Iowa State Fair is Decadent and Depraved"	Justin Comer and Evan Jones (Rock Hard Caucus podcast)	August 14, 2023	—
849	759	"The Mark Hotel of the Beast"	—	August 17, 2023	Premium
850	—	"Bonus:WGA/SAG Strike Update"	—	August 19, 2023	—
851	760	"Bonus:Live From Toronto: Operation Maple Thunder"	—	August 21, 2023	Live
852	761	"The Table of Failure"	—	August 24, 2023	Premium
853	—	"Live from Montreal: T*barnak!"	—	August 24, 2023	Live, Premium
854	762	"The Safari Club"	Brendan James and Noah Kulwin	August 29, 2023	James' 22nd episode, Kulwin's 7th episode
855	763	"No Hogs, No Masters"	—	August 31, 2023	Premium
856	764	"The Schlapp's Exorcist"	—	September 5, 2023	—
857	765	"Searching for Sugar, Man"	Josh Cohen (@ettingermentum)	September 7, 2023	Premium; Cohen's 2nd episode
858	766	"Mt. EverQuest"	—	September 11, 2023	—
859	767	"The Bad Lieutenant's Benevolence Association"	Sam Lipman-Stern, Adam Bhala Lough	September 14, 2023	Premium, review of the limited series Telemarketers
860	768	"Handjob for the Recently Deceased"	—	September 18, 2023	—
861	—	"Reason Why The Show Is Late"	—	September 22, 2023	Announcement about Matt’s health and the future of the show
862	769	"Band of Brothers"	Kath Krueger	October 2, 2023	Krueger’s 15th episode
863	770	"Master & Commander"	Kath Krueger	October 5, 2023	Premium; Krueger’s 16th episode
864	771	"The Crossing"	Mohammad Alsaafin	October 10, 2023	Alsaafin’s 3rd episode
865	772	"Tales From the Yelp"	Bryan Quinby	October 12, 2023	Premium; Quinby’s 11th episode
866	773	"Israeli Self Harm Force"	—	October 12, 2023	—
867	774	"The Ingraham Angle"	Bryan Quinby	October 19, 2023	Premium; Quinby’s 12th episode
868	775	"The Wrestler"	David Roth	October 23, 2023	Roth’s 9th episode
869	776	"Methusula and The Mad Dog"	David Roth	October 26, 2023	Premium; Roth’s 10th episode
870	777	"Burn Book"	Vincent Bevins	October 30, 2023	Bevins’ 2nd episode
871	778	"The Other Side"	Jack Wagner	November 2, 2023	Premium; Wagner’s 5th episode
872	779	"The Rude Dozen"	Derek Davison	November 6, 2023	Davison’s 21st episode
873	780	"The Blow Gas State"	Tom Sexton of The Trillbillies	November 9, 2023	Premium; Tom’s first solo episode
874	781	"Goon Dad"	—	November 13, 2023	—
875	782	"Israeli Vasdeferens Force"	Mark Ames	November 16, 2023	Premium
876	783	"Dream Hoarders, LLC"	Madinah Wilson-Anton	November 20, 2023	—
877	784	"Spanish Civil War, part 1: Pronunciamento y Pistolerismo"	—	November 23, 2023	Premium; First episode of a series on the Spanish Civil War
878	785	"Tank Girls"	Brace Belden	November 27, 2023	Belden’s 13th episode
879	786	"Able I Was Ere I Saw Ridley"	Everett Rummage	December 1, 2023	Premium; Review of the film Napoleon
880	787	"Octagonal Relations"	Karim Zidan	December 4, 2023	Zidan’s 3rd episode
881	788	"The AMIA Mystery"	Stef (@iwrite4jacobin)	December 4, 2023	—
882	789	"E-ACK!!!"	Liz Franczak	December 7, 2023	Premium: Franczak’s 8th episode
883	790	"Advice for Dark Psychologies"	Hesse Deni	December 12, 2023	Deni’s 4th episode
884	791	"Kirby Star Allies"	—	December 14, 2023	Premium
885	792	"Today in Gay"	Hesse Deni, Jacques Gonsoulin, and Ben Mora from the Seeking Derangements	December 18, 2023	Mora’s 7th episode, Deni’s 5th episode, Gonsoulin’s 3rd episode
886	793	"Mr. Boring’s Opus"	Bryan Quinby	December 22, 2023	Premium; Quinby’s 13th episode

=== 2024 ===
No. overall	Given No.	Title	Guests	Original release date	Notes
887	794	"Gooneiform"	Stavros Halkias	January 1, 2024	Halkias’ 10th episode
888	795	"Acknowledging Complexity"	Séamus Malekafzali	January 4, 2024	Premium; Malekafzali’s 4th episode
889	796	"Tunnel Kings"	—	January 9, 2024	—
890	797	"Gottenheimerdamgerung"	Ryan Grim	January 11, 2024	Premium; Grim's 4th episode
891	798	"Iowa Carcass"	Josh Cohen (@ettingermentum)	January 15, 2024	Cohen's 3rd episode
892	799	"Swag on Loan From God"	Christopher Robbins and Katie Way	January 18, 2024	Premium
893	800	"Puzzle Palace"	—	January 22, 2024	—
894	801	"Modern Major Generals"	Derek Davison	January 25, 2024	Premium; Davison’s 22nd episode
895	802	"Adult High School"	Alex Nichols	January 29, 2024	Nichols’ 8th episode
896	803	"The Buc-ee’s Brigade"	Jake and Thomas from the Pendejo Time podcast	February 1, 2024	Premium; Pendejo Time’s 2nd episode
897	804	"All My Neighbors Cousins"	Caleb, Cameron, and Patrick from Podcast About List	February 5, 2024	Podcast About List’s 3rd episode
898	805	"My First Genocide"	Ali Abunimah	February 8, 2024	—
899	806	"Hero of Wives"	—	February 12, 2024	—
900	807	"The GF Test"	Kath Krueger	February 15, 2024	Premium; Krueger’s 17th episode
901	808	"Pussy in Bardo"	Ed Zitron	February 19, 2024	Zitron’s 2nd episode
902	809	"Spanish Civil War, part 2: Falange y FAI"	—	February 22, 2024	Premium
903	810	"The Forbidden Zone"	Alex Nichols	February 27, 2024	Nichols’ 9th episode
904	811	"El Nuevo Camelot"	Max Palma	March 1, 2024	Premium; Palma’s 6th episode
905	—	"BONUS: The Octopus Murders"	Christian Hansen and Zachary Treitz	March 4, 2024	Interview with the filmmakers behind the Netflix docuseries American Conspiracy: The Octopus Murders
906	812	"Sweeney Odd"	Osita Nwanevu	March 5, 2024	Nwanevu’s 4th episode
907	—	"BONUS: The Uncommitted Movement"	Layla Elabed and Waleed Shahid	March 8, 2024	—
908	813	"Springtime for Germany"	Ciarán Dold and Nick (Corner Späti podcast)	March 7, 2024	Premium
909	—	"Movie Mindset Oscar Preview ‘24"	Hesse Deni	March 8, 2024	Deni’s 6th episode
910	814	"A Pond Too Far"	—	March 11, 2024	—
911	815	"Ask Me No Quoras"	Quorators Podcast: Alex Ptak and Jeremy Kaplowitz	March 14, 2024	Premium
912	816	"Steampie"	Charles Austin	March 18, 2024	—
913	817	"Big Faust Conference"	Mike Recine	March 21, 2024	Premium; Recine’s 5th episode
914	818	"Dr. Brain & the Women"	Alex Nichols	March 25, 2024	Nichols’ 10th episode
915	819	"Poppy, Pt. 4: The White Rose"	Michael S. Judge	March 28, 2024	Premium
916	820	"The Neese"	—	April 1, 2024	—
917	821	"Jacques-a-Lago"	Jacques Gonsoulin	April 5, 2024	Premium; Gonsoulin’s 4th episode
918	822	"Curb Your Shogunate"	—	April 9, 2024	—
919	823	"Drop the Bass Reeves"	Jacob Bacharach	April 11, 2024	Premium; Bacharach’s 6th episode
920	824	"To Look and To Watch"	Alex Nichols	April 15, 2024	Nichols’ 11th episode
921	825	"The Pleasant Country"	Josh Cohen (@ettingermentum)	April 18, 2024	Premium; Cohen's 4th episode
922	826	"University Challenge"	Basil Zacharia Rodriguez	April 23, 2024	—
923	827	"Bastards in Heaven"	Hesse Deni	April 25, 2024	Premium; Deni’s 7th episode; review of the film Civil War
924	828	"59'33""	Alex Nichols	April 29, 2024	Nichols’ 12th episode
925	—	"Movie Mindset Bonus: Interview With Director Radu Jude"	Radu Jude	May 2, 2024	Bonus episode from the “Movie Mindset” series
926	829	"Banality in the UK"	Riley Quinn	May 2, 2024	Premium
927	830	"Vat Grown Oaf"	The Trillbillies	May 6, 2024	The Trillbillies’ 4th episode
928	—	"Bonus: UCLA Encampment Update"	Anny Viloria Winnett	May 7, 2024	—
929	—	"MM19: Hawks Screwballs feat. Theda Hammel & John Early"	Theda Hammel and John Early	May 8, 2024	—
930	831	"Fan Gruel"	David Roth	May 9, 2024	Premium; Roth’s 11th episode
931	—	"Bonus: Inside Higher Ed"	Anonymous university administrator	May 9, 2024	—
932	832	"Real World Blues"	Alex Nichols	May 13, 2024	Nichols' 13th episode
933	—	"MM20: 90’s Neo-Noirs feat. Hit Factory Podcast"	Aaron and Carlee from Hit Factory Podcast	May 14, 2024	—
934	833	"Fruit Brute"	Bryan Quinby	May 16, 2024	Premium; Quinby's 14th episode; review of the film Unfrosted
935	834	"Weakness Will Get You Nowhere"	Jake and Thomas from the Pendejo Time podcast	May 20, 2024	Pendejo Time's 3rd episode
936	835	"O-H-F-U"	DJ Byrnes	May 23, 2024	Premium
937	836	"Pier One Imports"	Derek Davison	May 28, 2024	Davison's 23rd episode
938	837	"Flag Hags"	Tim and Andy from the ALAB Series podcast	May 30, 2024	Premium
939	838	"Enemies of the Group Chat"	Alex Nichols	June 4, 2024	Nichols' 14th episode
940	839	"King of the Swill"	Ben Clarkson	June 7, 2024	Premium; Clarkson's 2nd episode
941	840	"Tom of Finlandization"	—	June 11, 2024	—
942	—	"Bonus: Ren Faire"	Lance Oppenheim	June 13, 2024	Interview with the director of the HBO docuseries Ren Faire
943	841	"Fr*ciaggine Follies"	Hesse Deni and Ben Mora from the Seeking Derangements podcast	June 14, 2024	Premium; Deni and Mora's 8th episodes
944	842	"Fleet Week"	Alex Nichols	June 18, 2024	Nichols' 15th episode
945	843	"Such Sights to Show-Me"	Devin O'Shea	June 20, 2024	Premium
946	844	"Journey to the End of the Night"	Kavitha Chekuru and Sharif Abdel Kouddous	June 24, 2024	Interview with the filmmakers behind The Night Won't End: Biden's War on Gaza
947	—	"Bonus: Axios and Allies"	Jael Holzman	June 27, 2024	—
948	845	"We Need The Machines"	Adam Friedland	June 28, 2024	Premium; Friedland's 12th episode
949	846	"Sundown of the Erdtree"	Josh Cohen (@ettingermentum), Dave Weigel	June 28, 2024	Cohen's 5th episode; Weigel's 4th episode
950	847	"Spanish Civil War, part 3: No Pasarán"	—	July 4, 2024	Premium
951	848	"Straight Drop Kitchen"	Ryan Grim and Jeremy Scahill	July 8, 2024	Grim's 5th episode
952	849	"Scream On It"	Hesse Deni, Jacques Gonsoulin, Ben Mora from the Seeking Derangements podcast	July 12, 2024	Premium; Deni and Mora's 9th episodes; Gonsoulin’s 5th episode
953	850	"Enter the Battle Box"	Kath Krueger and Mina Parkison	July 15, 2024	Krueger's 18th episode
954	851	"Elvira"	—	July 18, 2024	Premium
955	852	"Do the Dew"	Hasan Piker	July 23, 2024	Piker's 2nd episode
956	853	"My Beautiful Laundrette"	Kath Krueger	July 25, 2024	Premium; Krueger's 19th episode
957	854	"Medbeg Bugs"	Alex Nichols	July 29, 2024	Nichols' 16th episode
958	855	"Take Me Out To The Ballgame"	Séamus Malekafzali	August 1, 2024	Premium; Malekafzali's 5th episode
959	856	"Bear Market"	Jeff Stein	August 5, 2024	Stein's 2nd episode
960	857	"Our Keir"	Eyeup Lovely	August 8, 2024	Premium
961	858	"That's Not Entirely Accurate"	Jon Bois	August 12, 2024	Bois' 2nd episode
962	859	"Our Home And Native Land"	Dan Boeckner	August 15, 2024	Premium; Boeckner's 5th episode
963	860	"Super Taco Tuesday"	Alex Nichols	August 19, 2024	Nichols' 17th episode
964	861	"DNC LIVE"	Hasan Piker, Brace Belden and Liz Franczak	August 22, 2024	Premium; Live show with TrueAnon in Chicago, Illinois
965	862	"The Donkey Show"	Dave Weigel and Josh Cohen (@ettingermentum)	August 27, 2024	Cohen's 6th episode; Weigel's 5th episode
966	863	"A.I.: Attentional Intelligence"	Hesse Deni	August 29, 2024	Premium; Deni's 10th episode
967	864	"Gent’s Video"	James Adomian	September 4, 2024	Adomian's 27th episode
968	865	"Mr. Powell Goes To Washington"	David Sirota	September 6, 2024	Premium; Sirota's 3rd episode
969	866	"Ronnie, Talk to Russia"	Daniel Bessner and Derek Davison	September 10, 2024	Bessner's 9th episode, Davison's 24th episode
970	867	"Pet Shop Boy"	David J. Roth	September 14, 2024	Premium; Roth's 12th episode
971	868	"Caddy-Shook"	Ben Clarkson and Matt Bors	September 17, 2024	Clarkson's 3rd episode, Bors' 2nd episode
972	—	"Bonus: House of Crumbs"	Christopher Robbins and Katie Way	September 20, 2024	Robbins' and Katie's 2nd episode
973	869	"The Big Dirty"	—	September 20, 2024	Premium
974	870	"Holiday in Cambodia"	Brendan James and Noah Kulwin	September 24, 2024	James' 23rd episode, Kulwin's 8th episode
975	871	"The Thin Red Lines"	Mohammad Alsaafin	September 26, 2024	Alsaafin's 4th episode
976	872	"Crossing the Bosphorus"	Alex Nichols	October 1, 2024	Nichols' 18th episode
977	873	"Young Wolf and Pud"	Séamus Malekafzali	October 4, 2024	Premium; Malekafzali's 6th episode
978	874	"The Nut"	Kath Krueger	October 7, 2024	Krueger's 20th episode
979	875	"Toe Sucking"	—	October 10, 2024	Premium; review of the first half of Tulsa King's second season
980	876	"Escape from MAGAtraz"	Alex Nichols	October 14, 2024	Nichols' 19th episode
981	877	"The Red Corner"	Karim Zidan	October 17, 2024	Zidan's 4th episode
982	878	"You Will NEVER Regret Listening to this Episode"	Max Read	October 21, 2024	—
983	879	"AVN Award Winner"	Adam Friedland	October 24, 2024	Premium; Friedland's 13th appearance
984	880	"End of the Line"	Dave Weigel and Josh Cohen (@ettingermentum)	October 28, 2024	Cohen's 7th episode; Weigel's 6th episode
985	881	"Kook Hunter"	Kath Krueger	October 31, 2024	Krueger's 21st episode
986	882	"Election Eve Live"	Charles Austin, Alex Branson, Andrew Hudson	November 5, 2024	Live with Episode 1 in Los Angeles, California; special appearance from Matt Christman
987	883	"History Doesn't Repeat Itself... But It Slimes"	—	November 7, 2024	Premium; Unlocked
988	884	"Pool Boys"	—	November 11, 2024	—
989	885	"Don't Cry in Front of the Mexicans"	Alexander Aviña	November 14, 2024	Premium
990	886	"Cabinet Curiosity"	Alex Nichols	November 18, 2024	Nichols' 20th Episode
991	887	"General Dynamics"	Bryan Quinby	November 22, 2024	Premium; review of the remaining episode of Tulsa King's second season; Quinby's 15th Episode
992	888	"Bustin' Out"	Moe Tkacik	November 25, 2024	—
993	889	"Citations Bleeding"	Adam Johnson and Othman Ali	November 27, 2024	Premium
994	890	"Spare Us, Cutter"	Adam Johnson and Othman Ali	December 2, 2024	—
995	891	"Open Enrollment Season"	Jake and Thomas from the Pendejo Time podcast	December 5, 2024	Premium; Pendejo Time's 4th Episode
996	892	"Talking Points Memo"	Jael Holzman	December 10, 2024	Holzman's 2nd Episode
997	893	"We Left the Percs with Maher"	Derek Davison	December 13, 2024	Davison's 25th Episode
998	894	"Drone Bore"	David Roth	December 17, 2024	Roth's 13th Episode
999	895	"Meat Cube"	Hesse Deni, Jacques Gonsoulin, Ben Mora from the Seeking Derangements podcast	December 20, 2024	Premium; Deni and Mora's 10th episodes; Gonsoulin’s 6th episode
1000	—	"Bonus: The Postman Always Is Nice"	Tyler Vasseur, shop steward with NALC	December 23, 2024	—
1001	896	"Merry Christman"	—	December 25, 2024	Premium; Matt Christman returns as a host

=== 2025 ===
No. overall	Given No.	Title	Guests	Original release date	Notes
1002	897	"Urquellization"	—	January 6, 2025	—
1003	898	"Bragg and Tag"	Seth Harp	January 10, 2025	Premium
1004	899	"Nut Up"	Yasha Levine and Rowan Wernham	January 13, 2025	—
1005	—	"BONUS: Y2K"	Colette Shade	January 14, 2025	—
1006	900	"IT'S OVER 900!!!!"	—	January 16, 2025	Premium
1007	901	"VI-Day"	Mohammad Alsaafin	January 20, 2025	—
1008	902	"Degenerative AI"	Ed Zitron	January 23, 2025	Premium
1009	903	"Tuna Melt Moment"	Alex Nichols	January 27, 2025	—
1010	904	"Flight Risk"	—	January 30, 2025	Premium
1011	905	"Roko’s Modern Life"	Brace Belden	February 3, 2025	—
1012	—	"BONUS: Z for Zohran"	—	February 6, 2025	—
1013	906	"Fun Mom Dinner"	Will Tavlin	February 6, 2025	Premium
1014	907	"Big Balls"	Kath Krueger and Jeff Stein	February 10, 2025	—
1015	908	"Death & Mass Kids"	—	February 13, 2025	Premium
1016	909	"A Real Hero"	Pendejo Time	February 17, 2025	Pendejo Time's 5th Episode
1017	910	"Guaranteed Possibilities"	Flep24	February 20, 2025	Premium
1018	911	"Red Dawn"	Radio War Nerd	February 24, 2025	Ame's 2nd episode, Dolan's 4th episode
1019	912	"The Ale Shambles"	Scroungers	February 27, 2025	Premium; Eyup Lovely's 2nd episode
1020	913	"Only the Lonely"	Julian Feeld	March 3, 2025	Feeld's 2nd episode
1021	914	"Keep Truthing"	—	March 6, 2025	Premium; review of Zero Day
1022	915	"Hero Hedge"	Joe Weisenthal	March 10, 2025	—
1023	916	"Everything's Tallow"	Séamus Malekafzali	March 13, 2025	Premium; Malekafzali's 7th episode
1024	917	"Touchdown Tim Chitters"	DJ Byrnes & Eephus	March 17, 2025	Byrnes' 2nd episode
1025	918	"Welcome to Wonderland"	Grant Miner	March 20, 2025	Premium
1026	919	"Abruendance Agenda"	Madinah Wilson-Anton, Matt Bruenig	March 24, 2025	Wilson-Anton's 2nd episode, Bruenig's 5th episode
1027	920	"Fist, Flag, Fire"	Bad Hasbara	March 27, 2025	Premium
1028	921	"Health Scare"	Timothy "T-Bone" Faust	March 31, 2025	Faust's 6th episode
1029	—	"Bonus:Ukrainian Politics Deep Dive"	Peter Korotaev	April 3, 2025	—
1030	922	"The Academy"	Robert Franco	April 4, 2025	—
1031	923	"The Banks Are Out of Money"	Dave Weigel	April 8, 2025	Weigel's 7th episode
1032	924	"Our Beef is Beautiful"	—	April 10, 2025	—
1033	925	"Banshee, PA Chamber of Commerce"	Kath Kreuger	April 14, 2025	—
1034	926	"G20 Blaze It"	Kath Kreuger	April 17, 2025	—
1035	927	"Americas, The Beautiful"	Greg Grandin	April 21, 2025	—
1036	—	"MM: Casino"	Felix Biederman	April 23, 2025	—
1037	928	"Wait and See"	The Trillbillies (Tarance, Tom, Aaron)	April 25, 2025	—
1038	929	"Given"	Alex Nichols	April 28, 2025	—
1039	—	"MM34: Fame & Psychosis: The Red Shoes & Perfect Blue"	—	April 30, 2025	—
1040	930	"Around The Smoke"	—	May 2, 2025	—
1041	—	"BONUS: Michigan Raids on pro-Palestine Students"	Nora Hilgart-Griff, Liz Jacob	May 5, 2025	—
1042	931	"Studies in Stupid"	Sam Seder	May 5, 2025	—
1043	—	"MM35: Peckinpah"	Noah Kulwin	May 7, 2025	—
1044	932	"Sweet Virginia"	Goad Gatsby	May 9, 2025	—
1045	933	"We Can Grok It For You Wholesale"	Mike Isaac	May 12, 2025	—
1046	—	"MM36: Cops & Robbers"	Robert Franco	May 14, 2025	—
1047	934	"We're Listening"	—	May 15, 2025	—
1048	935	"It's Joever"	David J. Roth	May 19, 2025	—
1049	—	"MM37: Enter the Scheider-verse"	Andrew Hudson	May 21, 2025	—
1050	936	"Permanent Midnight"	Ryan Grim & Jeremy Scahill	May 22, 2025	—
1051	937	"Killing Santa"	Arjun Singh & David Sirota	May 27, 2025	—
1052	—	"MM38: 90's Trans Representation"	Louise Weard	May 28, 2025	—
1053	938	"Let's Punish People"	Seeking Derangements	May 29, 2025	—
1054	939	"Boom Times For Goons"	Adam Friedland	June 2, 2025	—
1055	—	"Trust the Process"	Mike Leigh	June 4, 2025	—
1056	940	"The Sobbing Elf"	—	June 5, 2025	—
1057	941	"Sister Number One"	Aída Chávez	June 10, 2025	—
1058	—	"MM40: Hong Kong Havoc"	Jon Gabrus	June 11, 2025	—
1059	942	"Jody Division"	Pendejo Time	June 13, 2025	—
1060	943	"The Tehran Offensive"	Séamus Malekafzali	June 16, 2025	—
1061	—	"MM41: Don & Clint"	John Semley	June 18, 2025	—
1062	944	"Black Halberd Hashish Company"	Derek Davison & Eleanor Janega	June 19, 2025	—
1063	—	"BONUS: LA ICE Raids, Protests and Immigration Justice"	Hugo Soto-Martinez	June 21, 2025	—
1064	945	"Hashtag Fordow Fail"	Libby Watson	June 23, 2025	—
1065	—	"Movie Mindset Bonus - Interview With Director Lexi Alexander"	Lexi Alexander	June 24, 2025	—
1066	—	"MM42: Hippie Satire '68"	—	June 25, 2025	—
1067	946	"Day of the Z"	Alan Siegel	June 26, 2025	—
1068	947	"Laugh Now, Cry Later"	Larry Charles	June 30, 2025	—
1069	—	"Movie Mindset Bonus - Interview With Director Ari Aster"	Ari Aster	July 2, 2025	—
1070	948	"Smooth Operators"	Brace Belden	July 3, 2025	—
1071	949	"Big Beautiful Swill"	Tim Faust	July 7, 2025	—
1072	950	"Sometimes Trust a Pedophile"	Kath Kreuger	July 11, 2025	—
1073	951	"My Boys And In Some Cases Gals"	Alex Nichols	July 14, 2025	—
1074	952	"The Sissy Boy Initiative"	Liv Agar & Spencer Barrows	July 17, 2025	—
1075	953	"The Hills Have Eyes"	Jasper Nathaniel	July 21, 2025	—
1076	954	"The Peoples' Crisis"	Seeking Derangements	July 24, 2025	—
1077	955	"Memory"	—	July 28, 2025	—
1078	956	"High Energy Party"	Pendejo Time	July 31, 2025	—
1079	—	"BONUS - The Bitter Buddha"	Eddie Pepitone	August 1, 2025	—
1080	957	"Democracy Soon!"	Osita Nwanevu	August 4, 2025	—
1081	958	"Thursday Night Volckerball"	Jamie Merchant	August 7, 2025	—
1082	959	"The Bopper's Lair"	—	August 11, 2025	—
1083	960	"Data For Progress"	Pod About List	August 14, 2025	—
1084	961	"The Dogs of War"	Seth Harp	August 18, 2025	—
1085	962	"Barrel Breaking"	Bryan Quinby	August 22, 2025	—
1086	963	"Distractions"	Prem Thakker	August 25, 2025	—
1087	964	"The Canterbury Fails"	Katherine Krueger	August 28, 2025	—
1088	965	"A Chorus Line"	Alex Nichols	September 2, 2025	—
1089	—	"The Players Club: Metal Gear Solid (1998) - Am I My Brother's Streaker"	—	September 3, 2025	Bonus series with Biederman and Brendan James
1090	966	"The Three Stooges"	Andrew Hudson	September 4, 2025	—
1091	967	"Whitehat"	Derek Davison	September 8, 2025	—
1092	—	"The Players Club: Metal Gear Solid 2: Sons of Liberty (2001) - The Making of the President"	—	September 10, 2025	—
1093	968	"The Dabbing Will Continue"	—	September 11, 2025	—
1094	969	"Pablo Torre Fucks Around and Finds Out"	Pablo Torre	September 15, 2025	—
1095	—	"The Players Club: Metal Gear Solid 3: Snake Eater (2004) - Band of Brothers"	—	September 17, 2025	—
1096	970	"The Glimmering"	Hesse Deni	September 18, 2025	—
1097	971	"The Years of Whatever"	Will Sommer	September 22, 2025	—
1098	—	"The Players Club: Metal Gear Solid 4: Guns of the Patriots (2008) - The Hero's Journey to R/Childfree"	—	September 24, 2025	—
1099	972	"The Cass Jedi"	—	September 25, 2025	—
1100	973	"Cross on the Moon"	Brendan James	September 29, 2025	—
1101	—	"BONUS: The Sumud Flotilla Interview"	Zue Jernstedt	September 30, 2025	—
1102	—	"The Players Club: Metal Gear Solid: Peace Walker (2010) - Peace of Ass"	—	October 1, 2025	—
1103	—	"MM43 - Punks & Bad Boys"	—	October 2, 2025	—
1104	974	"Kid Fresh"	Andrew Hudson	October 2, 2025	—
1105	—	"BONUS: ICE is Coming to a City Near You"	Memo Torres	October 3, 2025	—
1106	975	"Like a Virgin"	Séamus Malekafzali	October 6, 2025	—
1107	—	"The Players Club: Metal Gear Solid: Ground Zeroes (2014) - Hot Zone Cuba"	—	October 8, 2025	—
1108	976	"Enter the Sheridan-verse"	Bryan Quinby	October 9, 2025	—
1109	—	"MM44 - Horror Sequels II"	Tom Scharpling	October 9, 2025	—
1110	977	"The Next Day"	Ryan Grim and Jeremy Scahill	October 13, 2025	—
1111	—	"The Players Club: Metal Gear Solid V: The Phantom Pain (2015) - The Man Inside of Me (Part I)"	—	October 16, 2025	—
1112	978	"Sex is Gay"	David J. Roth	October 16, 2025	—
1113	—	"MM45 - Girls, Girls, Girls!"	—	October 17, 2025	—
1114	979	"Cat People (Running For Mayor)"	Jon Bois	October 20, 2025	—
1115	—	"The Players Club S1E8 - Metal Gear Solid V: The Phantom Pain (2015) - The Perfect Weapon (Part II)"	—	October 23, 2025	—
1116	980	"Law & Order: Chapo Victims Unit, Part 1"	Hesse Deni, DM Patches	October 23, 2025	—
1117	—	"MM46 - Serial Killers"	Theda Hammel	October 25, 2025	—
1118	981	"Down in the Mall"	—	October 27, 2025	—
1119	—	"BONUS - Zohran: The Final Stretch"	Zohran Mamdani	October 30, 2025	—
1120	982	"Law & Order: Chapo Victims Unit, Part 2"	Hesse Deni, DM Patches	October 30, 2025	—
1121	983	"The Killing Fields"	Jasper Nathaniel	November 3, 2025	—
1122	984	"Gooner 4 Life"	Daniel Kolitz	November 6, 2025	—
1123	—	"MM47 - Internet, Dating: Audition & Pulse"	—	November 7, 2025	—
1124	985	"The Murder Inc. Doctrine"	Greg Grandin	November 10, 2025	—
1125	986	"To Walk the Brandon Path"	Molly Lambert	November 13, 2025	—
1126	987	"May I Meet You?"	Ed Zitron	November 17, 2025	—
1127	988	"Notes on a ZZcandal"	—	November 20, 2025	—
1128	989	"Butt Crappened"	Sarah Squirm	November 24, 2025	—
1129	990	"In The Oaf of Madness"	Pendejo Time	November 27, 2025	—
1130	991	"Occupation: Public Figure"	Seth Harp	December 1, 2025	—
1131	992	"Can't Find a Fetterman"	—	December 4, 2025	—
1132	993	"From the Columbia River to the Sea"	Andrew Hudson	December 8, 2025	—
1133	994	"Waiting for the Miracle"	Séamus Malekafzali and Dylan Saba	December 11, 2025	—
1134	995	"The Numerology Guys"	Alex Nichols	December 15, 2025	—
1135	996	"Man Versus Pet"	—	December 18, 2025	—
1136	997	"Moment For 25 To Life"	—	December 23, 2025	—
1137	998	"A Stupids' History of America"	—	December 25, 2025	—

=== 2026 ===
No. overall	Given No.	Title	Guests	Original release date	Notes
1138	999	"Nazis, Pedophiles, Drunks, Rapists & Thieves"	—	January 5, 2026	—
1139	1000	"How The West Was Wing"	Brendan James, Hasan Piker, Raina Douris, Ryan Grim, Hesse Deni, Liz Franczak, Kath Krueger, Luke Savage, Molly Mary O’Brien, Amber Rollo, Alex Branson, and Charles Austin	January 8, 2026	—
1140	1001	"The Midwest Bank"	Maryam Mohamad	January 12, 2026	—
1141	1002	"Crash Out City"	—	January 15, 2026	—
1142	—	"I Want My M(amdani)TV"	Donald Borenstein, Andrew Epstein and Debbie Saslaw	January 16, 2026	—
1143	1003	"Bored of Peace"	Derek Davison	January 19, 2026	—

== Repeat guests ==
Virgil Texas and Brendan James made multiple appearances before becoming cohosts, and Amber A'Lee Frost also made a guest appearance before becoming a cohost. After retiring as a cohost and producer, Brendan James occasionally continues to appear as a guest. This list only counts appearances by cohosts before or after they were a cohost.

Number of appearances	Guests
27	James Adomian (including brief in-character appearances)
25	Derek Davison
21	Katherine Krueger
20	Brendan James; Alex Nichols
15	Bryan Quinby
14	Brace Belden
13	Adam Friedland; David Roth
9	Ben Mora; Hesse Deni; Stavros Halkias; Libby Watson; Liz Franczak
8	Matt V. Brady; Tim Heidecker (including a brief in-character appearance as Alex Jones); Daniel Bessner; Noah Kulwin
7	Will Sommer; Joshua A. Cohen (@ettingermentum); Dave Weigel
6	Jacob Bacharach; Trevor Beaulieu ("Ricky Rawls," "T."); Jacques Gonsoulin; Don Hughes; Séamus Malekafzali; Max Palma
5	Dan Boeckner; Steven Donziger; Timothy "T-Bone" Faust; Matt Karp; Ryan Grim; Mike Recine; Jack Wagner; Karim Zidan; Pendejo Time Podcast
4	Alex Branson; Matt Bruenig; Osita Nwanevu; DM Patches; Brett Payne; Matt Taibbi; The Trillbillies; Mohammad Alsaafin
3	@hayleyglyphs; Ike Barinholtz; Marcus Barnett; Liz Bruenig; Rob Delaney; John Dolan; Shuja Haider; Stefan Heck; Andrew Hudson; Sam Kriss; Karina Moreno; Nick Mullen; Alex Pareene; Podcast About List; Brandon Wardell; Slavoj Žižek; Hasan Piker; David Sirota; Ben Clarkson; Ed Zitron
2	Aaron from Chapo FYM; Josh Androsky; Dave Anthony; Charles Austin; Kath Barbadoro; Vincent Bevins; Lucy Biederman; Jon Bois; Bill Corbett; David Cross; Adam Curtis; Aaron Good; Briahna Joy Gray; Glenn Greenwald; Katie Halper; Jael Holzman; Connor Kilpatrick; Naomi Klein; Matt Maini; Adam McKay; Jefferson Morley; Angela Nagle; Simone Norman; Bill Oakley; @dril & Derek Estevez-Olsen; Patton Oswalt; Jen Pan; PFT Commenter; Nithya Raman; Kim Stanley Robinson; Amber Rollo; Jon Schwarz; Sam Seder; Jeff Stein; Tom from Chapo FYM; Eli Valley; Ollie Vargas; Richard D. Wolff; Patrick Wyman; Matt Bors; Christopher Robbins; Katie Way
