= Street Fight Radio =

- The logo used by Street Fight Radio was an anvil with "SF" as an acronym.
- Genre: Politics, humor
- Language: English

Cast and voices
- Hosted by: Brett Payne and Bryan Quinby

Production
- Length: 60–180 minutes

Publication
- Original release: June 23, 2011 – August 2022
- Updates: Thrice-weekly

Street Fight Radio, or Street Fight, was an American politics and humor radio show and podcast founded in June 2011 and hosted by Bryan Quinby and Brett Payne. The show produced three distinct episodes per week. In addition to producing the radio show and podcasts, through its Patreon, Street Fight Radio also published a monthly zine and additional video content.

Along with other podcasts such as Chapo Trap House, and publications like The Baffler and Current Affairs, Street Fight Radio has been cited as an example of the dirtbag left, a group of left-wing media figures described as mixing humor with "a take-no-prisoners style of American socialism".

== Content ==
Street Fight billed itself as an "anarcho-comedy" radio show, where the hosts and fans of the show have sympathies to left-wing politics. Common topics and discussions on the show include the shape of the earth, labor unions, the merits of footwear, getting your hair cut at the post office, socialism, "small business tyrants," cryptids, failures of capitalism and the gig economy, nu metal, and anarchism.

Street Fight Radio produced three episodes per week. The first was a live call-in show broadcast Sundays weekly on the community radio station WCRS in Columbus, Ohio. A second episode with just the hosts (termed "the basement show") was released as a free podcast on Wednesdays. A final weekly "bonus" episode was released only to Patreon subscribers of $1 or more.

The format of the call-in shows (which can stretch to over three hours each week) was the first portion of the show features Brett and Bryan riffing on topics such as drugs, current events, news articles, or their families, with the remainder of the show answering calls from fans. Fans typically call in with anecdotes from their jobs, political organizing that the caller may be participating in, or just call in to talk about anything that's on the top of their mind. The second show each week, the "basement show", is a sixty to ninety minute show that is similar in format to the first part of the call in shows. The third show features either Brett or Bryan interviewing a guest of their choice. Past guests on the Interview Show have included the hosts of sister podcasts like Chapo Trap House, Struggle Session, and Delete Your Account, writers for various websites or other publications, and users associated with weird Twitter.

== History ==
Both hosts are natives of Columbus, Ohio and its immediate suburbs. Quinby began making podcasts with a friend in 2007. That same year, Payne had also co-hosted a different short-lived podcast Relatively Unknown. In 2008, Payne & Quinby met while making a new podcast, Murder Rebel Radio, which they created with several mutual friends. The two bonded over their shared experiences of financial hardship.

During this period, both hosts gained experience in stand-up comedy by attending open mics, but they quickly became frustrated with the open mic scene, and decided to focus on podcasts. In 2010, they began producing shows under the name "Brett & Bryan Recording Themselves" as part of the Murder Rebel Radio stream. Deciding to go "all in," Quinby & Payne left Murder Rebel Radio to focus on their new solo work shortly thereafter.

Street Fight Radio began in June 2011. Previously identifying as apolitical, the hosts underwent a radicalization process during 2012. Through their discussions with each other, they gradually became to identify as anarchists. In addition to recording the weekly podcast, they began to do live shows. Street Fight's Patreon was launched on October 13, 2014, but the show remained free.

A February 2016 episode of Street Fight served as the launching point for Chapo Trap House, when the latter show's future hosts met while reviewing the film 13 Hours: The Secret Soldiers of Benghazi. Chapo's immediate success provided Street Fight with a boost as well. This allowed the hosts to turn the show in to their full-time jobs in 2016. The show went from 1100 to 5000 weekly listeners by 2017. In order to differentiate themselves from the many left-wing podcasts appearing, Street Fight adopted a narrow focus on real-life and working-class experiences. Seeing Chapo's success with the Patreon bonus show format led to Street Fight adopting the paywalled third show for $1.

Around August 2022, the hosts parted ways and continue to create podcasts independent of each other.

== Collaborations ==
Their close connection with Chapo Trap House has meant the two podcasts have frequently worked together live. The first such "Chapo Trap House X Street Fight Radio Live Show" was recorded in Philadelphia during the 2016 Democratic National Convention. The two podcasts put on multiple joint shows in the spring of 2017, including performances in Washington, D.C. coinciding with the DisruptJ20 protests. They also appeared together during Chapo's tour in support of their book release in October 2018.

The podcast's 2017 "Flat Earth Tour" was arranged in part with support from members of the Democratic Socialists of America (DSA), Louisville Socialists, and Socialist Alternative (SA). A live show during the podcast's 2018 "Middlewest Tour" was held alongside an Incarcerated Workers Organizing Committee fundraising cook-off. In December of the same year, Street Fight held a fundraiser show in conjunction with the Pittsburgh DSA Socialist Feminist Committee in support of the abortion fund Western PA Fund For Choice.

One of the hosts' stated goals of the podcast has been to bring together like-minded people in parts of America who are outside of its major urban centers, and to help create a support system and audience for other leftist content producers in those areas. In July 2019, under the collective name of "The Hellfire Congregation of Radical Egalitarianism," Street Fight went on a tour of the Southern United States with the podcasts District Sentinel Radio and Trillbilly Workers Party, which included a visit to the 2019 DSA Convention in Atlanta.

Street Fight has been cited as an inspiration for videographer Nick Hayes to transition from work on commercials, ultimately leading him to create the anti-capitalist video service Means TV. Hayes worked with the show to record live performances in 2017 and 2019. Once Means TV launched, Quinby and Payne provided some of the launch video content for the fledgling service in early 2019.

== Reception ==
A 2016 feature in The A.V. Club, on the episode "Patriotic Motorcycle Heroes," described Street Fight as "frank and consistently hilarious." In February 2018, XFDR named Street Fight its podcast of the week, praising it as "a different kind of leftist podcast" in a market that was already "oversaturated."

As of August 2019, the show's Patreon was the 220th most popular overall, and 9th in its category (Adult Video). For the same month, Street Fight was ranked 416th in its category (News) by Apple Podcasts.

== See also ==
- Political podcast
