= The Chapo Guide to Revolution =

American political humor book

- Author: Chapo Trap House: Felix Biederman; Matt Christman; Brendan James; Will Menaker; Virgil Texas
- Language: English
- Genre: Political satire
- Publisher: Touchstone
- Publication date: August 21, 2018
- Publication place: United States
- Media type: Hardcover, audiobook, ebook
- Pages: 320
- ISBN: 978-1-5011-8728-5

The Chapo Guide to Revolution: A Manifesto Against Logic, Facts, and Reason is a 2018 satirical book by hosts of the American political humor podcast Chapo Trap House, published by Touchstone. The book debuted at number 6 on the New York Times Best Seller list in the Hardcover Nonfiction section.

== Content ==
The book deals with American history and capitalism, and "skewers" the two main American political parties. It also features cartoons from Eli Valley. The book originally contained parodies of several comic strips, but they were cut for legal reasons.

== Reception ==
The book received positive reviews in Salon, Paste, Newsweek and Harper's Magazine. In a negative review for Politico, Bill Scher said The Chapo Guide to Revolution was possibly the "stupidest book ever written about socialism."
