= The Fire This Time (audio documentary) =

2002 audio documentary

Studio album by Various artists
- Released: 9 June 2002
- Genre: Spoken word; Ambient techno; IDM
- Length: 154:49
- Label: Hidden Art
- Producer: Grant Wakefield

The Fire This Time is an audio documentary on the history and consequences of the Gulf War and following economic sanctions against Iraq. Produced by filmmaker Grant Wakefield, the 2-CD set featured music from electronic artists including Orbital, Pan Sonic, and Aphex Twin.

== Background ==
The Fire This Time originated when Wakefield and co-writer Miriam Ryle traveled to Iraq in order to film a follow-up to Ryle's documentary Voices in Iraq. Their footage, including an interview with U.N. Humanitarian Coordinator Hans-Christof von Sponeck critical of the sanctions on Iraq, was rejected by the BBC and Channel 4, with BBC World responding that they "do not accept rant pieces". Wakefield and Ryle instead produced a documentary for CD, consisting of spoken word, music, and clips of statements made by officials, journalists, media pundits and other figures such as American comedian Bill Hicks.

== Reception ==
Professional ratings
Review scores
| Source | Rating |
|---|---|
| Drowned in Sound | 10/10 |
| Uncut | 2/5 stars |

The Fire This Time has received nearly unanimous acclaim. The album was named as one of the best 50 albums of 2002 by The Wire magazine.

== Track listing ==
Disc one
| No. | Title | Artist | Length |
|---|---|---|---|
| 1. | "From The Cradle..." | Michael Stearns | 4:18 |
| 2. | "The Playground" | Ashra | 4:38 |
| 3. | "Lines In the Sand" | Higher Intelligence Agency | 4:54 |
| 4. | "Get Thee Behind Me" | Soma | 4:57 |
| 5. | "Counting On New Friends" | Orbital (remixed by Bump & Grind) | 5:04 |
| 6. | "The Whore of Babylon" | Pan Sonic | 5:04 |
| 7. | "We're Doing Well Now" | Barbed | 7:05 |
| 8. | "Nails In The Wall" | Speedy J and Kait Gray | 3:11 |
| 9. | "Say Hello To Allah" | Aphex Twin (remixed by Black Lung) | 7:11 |
| 10. | "Church Bells" | Speedy J, Bass Communion & Higher Intelligence Agency | 5:49 |
| 11. | "No News Is Good News" | Naseer Shamma & Bass Communion | 8:10 |
| 12. | "Dog In America" | Bola | 9:07 |
| 13. | "...To The Grave" | AMBA | 8:01 |
| Total length: | | | 77:37 |

Disc two – Instrumentals
| No. | Title | Artist | Length |
|---|---|---|---|
| 1. | "From the Cradle..." | Michael Stearns | 3:57 |
| 2. | "Lines in the Sand" | The Higher Intelligence Agency | 5:40 |
| 3. | "Get Thee Behind Me" | Soma | 5:22 |
| 4. | "The Box" (Equilibrium Found Mix) | Orbital (remixed by Bump 'n' Grind) | 4:57 |
| 5. | "Oud Improvisation" | Naseer Shamma | 7:11 |
| 6. | "We're Doing Well Now" | Barbed | 6:51 |
| 7. | "Nails in the Wall" (Vocal Track) | Kait Gray | 2:28 |
| 8. | "Come to Daddy" | Aphex Twin (remixed By Black Lung) | 3:11 |
| 9. | "Call to Prayer" | | 3:49 |
| 10. | "Conoid Tones" (Excerpt) | Higher Intelligence Agency | 6:54 |
| 11. | "No News Is Good News" | Naseer Shamma & Bass Communion | 8:22 |
| 12. | "Dog in America" | Bola | 10:16 |
| 13. | "Black Mountains" | AMBA | 3:46 |
| Total length: | | | 77:12 |

== See also ==
- Blowback
