= Blowback (podcast) =

American political podcast

- Cover image for season 1 of Blowback
- Genre: Political podcast; History podcast
- Language: American English

Cast and voices
- Hosted by: Noah Kulwin; Brendan James

Production
- Length: 30–90 minutes

Publication
- No. of seasons: 6
- No. of episodes: 60
- Original release: March 16, 2020
- Updates: Annually

Related
- Website: blowback.show

Blowback is a podcast about American empire and U.S. interventions hosted by journalist and activist Noah Kulwin and Brendan James, a former producer and frequent guest of Chapo Trap House.

The first season was released in 2020 and covers the Iraq War, and the second season released in 2021 focuses on U.S. intervention before and after the Cuban Revolution. The third season was aired in 2022 and discusses the Korean War, while the fourth season released in 2023 examines U.S. involvement in Afghanistan from 1979 to 2021. The fifth season premiered in 2024 and describes U.S. engagement in Cambodia in the 1970s, while the sixth season was released in 2025 and covers U.S. involvement in the Angolan Civil War from 1975 to 2002.

The podcast is available on Apple Podcasts and Spotify. Trailers for each season are released on YouTube. Each season of the show includes ten main narrative episodes and ten bonus episodes. The bonus episodes often feature special guests interviews or focus on a specific topic, and are available to paid subscribers of the podcast.

Blowback has received positive reviews with praise for its detail and critical examination of U.S. narratives, with some critics noting that the openly left-wing analysis of its hosts are supported by extensive research.

== Format ==
The cover art for season two of Blowback

The first season of the show was a ten part series dedicated to the Iraq War (codenamed "Operation Iraqi Freedom"). Throughout the show audio clips from MSNBC and CNN and readings of news reports are provided as well as satirical skits performed by H. Jon Benjamin. The second season of the show focuses on U.S. intervention before and after the Cuban revolution, such as Operation Mongoose, and includes more interviews with those who experienced the events discussed first hand. The third season of the show released in July 2022 and covers the events surrounding the Korean War. The fourth season of the show began its release in August 2023, discussing the American involvement in Afghanistan, touching on subjects which mainly focus on Operation Cyclone and its consequences. Season five released in September 2024 and covers the United States bombing campaign in Cambodia known as Operation Menu, the subsequent rise of the Khmer Rouge and the establishment of Democratic Kampuchea. In September 2025, the sixth season was released, focusing on American involvement in Angola alongside Cuba, South Africa and the Soviet Union.

== Episodes ==
=== Season 1 (2020) ===
While focused on the Iraq War, season 1 begins by examining the early relationship between the United States and Iraq. This includes the United States support for Iraq during the Iran–Iraq War and the Gulf War. In an interview with Gizmodo, when asked about the reasons for the United States invasion of Iraq, James responded, "[T]o what extent the war was to profit off of a newly acquired Iraqi oil industry is a more of an interesting question. It certainly was the main reason why we targeted Iraq – not even just with the Iraq War in 2003, but in 1991. The reason that Iraq could even be in the position to piss America off was because we had made friends with it due to its status as a strong oil producer and its strategic position against Iran, another very strong oil producer".

No.	Title	Running time	Original release date
0	"Iraqnophobia"	37:19	March 16, 2020
An introduction to the podcast and a look at the George W. Bush administration and family of Saddam Hussein. Featuring guests H. Jon Benjamin & James Adomian.
1	"Rosebud"	59:39	June 15, 2020
Taking a look at the origins of the United States' relationship with Iraq before and during the Cold War, the Iran–Iraq War, and Saddam Hussein's consolidation of power.
2	"American Psycho"	1:02:42	June 22, 2020
Focuses on the presidential administrations of George H. W. Bush and Bill Clinton, the Gulf War, and how international sanctions beginning in 1990 caused massive food shortages.
3	"Curveball"	1:02:42	June 29, 2020
This episode discusses the shift of the Bush administration's attention from Osama bin Laden and Afghanistan to Iraq, and examines the September 11 Attacks and weapons of mass destruction as justification for war in Iraq.
4	"Mars Attacks"	31:38	July 6, 2020
Secretary of State Colin Powell visits the United Nations to accuse Iraq and Saddam Hussein of having weapons of mass destruction before the war begins.
5	"Dead Links"	1:01:49	July 13, 2020
Breaking down the US and western media's coverage of the Iraq war. Featuring guest Will Menaker.
6	"Year Zero"	1:03:56	July 20, 2020
The episode describes the fall of Saddam Hussein, the beginnings of the United States' occupation of Iraq, the Green Zone in Baghdad, and introduces the role of Halliburton and other U.S. military contractors in the occupation.
7	"#Resistance"	1:00:36	July 27, 2020
This episode covers anti-American resistance by both Sunni and Shi'a militants in response to operations in Fallujah and Sadr City as well as war crimes committed by the American occupation, with a focus on Abu Ghraib torture and prisoner abuse.
8	"Electioneering"	59:09	August 3, 2020
The episode discusses the second presidential election of George W. Bush and an election in Iraq.
9	"How Do You Fuck That Up?"	1:02:25	August 10, 2020
As Iraq breaks out into civil war, the United States begins a new military offensive known as The Surge.
10	"The Iraq War Did Not Take Place"	1:05:26	August 17, 2020
Examining the end of the George W. Bush administration, the continuation and end of the Iraq war under Barack Obama, the rise of ISIS, and the presidency of Donald Trump. Note: This episode's title was inspired by Jean Baudrillard's The Gulf War Did Not Take Place.

==== Season 1 Bonus Episodes ====
No.	Title	Running time	Original release date
Bonus	"Our Man In Baghdad"	56:56	August 19, 2020
Noah interviews author and journalist Dahr Jamail.
Bonus	"Game Over"	43:51	August 20, 2020
Featuring guest Felix Biederman
Bonus	"Iraqi Horror Picture Show"	1:00:56	August 21, 2020
The hosts and featured guest Matt Christman review Hollywood's Iraq War films.
Bonus	"The Anti-War Equation"	43:31	August 22, 2020
Featuring guest Kathy Kelly
Bonus	"Shock Corridor"	40:09	August 23, 2020
Featured guest and author Naomi Klein joins the hosts.

=== Season 2 (2021) ===
No.	Title	Running time	Original release date
1	"The Jupiter Menace"	45:42	April 18, 2021
Introducing the historical players of the Cuban Missile Crisis and the United States' fascination with Cuba.
2	"Lo Hicimos"	1:20:31	April 18, 2021
A brief history of Cuba–United States relations ending with the success of the Cuban Revolution and the fall of Fulgencio Batista.
3	"New Normal"	1:16:40	April 25, 2021
Examines the Cuban revolution headed by Fidel Castro.
4	"Secret Honor"	1:15:41	May 2, 2021
As John F. Kennedy defeats Richard Nixon for the presidency, the CIA begins preparing for the Bay of Pigs Invasion. Fidel Castro visits the United States for the 1960 General Assembly of the United Nations in New York City and meets Malcolm X in Harlem.
5	"Fish Is Red"	1:00:22	May 9, 2021
The CIA executes the Bay of Pigs Invasion, which ends in failure.
6	"Nothing To Lose"	1:03:01	August 8, 2021
After recovering from the failure of the Bay of Pigs Invasion, the CIA begins Operation Mongoose, a terror and assassination campaign waged in Cuba.
7	"Anadyr"	1:12:45	August 15, 2021
In anticipation for another American invasion, the Cuban and Soviet relations strengthen and Soviet strategic missiles begin to be transported to Cuba.
8	"We'll All Meet In Hell"	1:05:52	August 22, 2021
The United States makes it public knowledge about the existence of nuclear weapons in Cuba, beginning the Cuban Missile Crisis. John F. Kennedy and Nikita Khrushchev begin negotiations.
9	"Cuba Libre"	1:22:45	August 29, 2021
The Cuban Missile Crisis is resolved to the dismay of the CIA and Cuban exiles.
10	"Infinite Crisis"	1:19:18	September 5, 2021
After the assassination of John F. Kennedy, the Cuba-US relationship deteriorates.

==== Season 2 Bonus Episodes ====
No.	Title	Running time	Original release date
Bonus	"Lo Distinto Se Parece"	49:09	July 4, 2021
Interviews with history professor Michelle Chase and Cuban scholar Marta Nuñez Sarmiento on the role of women in the Cuban revolution.
Bonus	"Watch Out For That Boy"	32:07	July 11, 2021
The hosts interview activists and historians about black radicalism and race in relation to Cuba and the revolution.
Bonus	"CIAin't Kiddin'"	39:10	July 18, 2021
Interview with Luna Olavarrio Gallegos about a failed US government attempt via USAID funding to infiltrate and co-opt the Cuban hip-hop scene.
Bonus	"Massive Retaliation"	30:13	July 25, 2021
Overview of the history of American nuclear weapons strategy at the time of the Cuban missile crisis.
Bonus	"Sweet Dirt Tony's Badasssss Song"	1:27:47	August 8, 2021
Discussion with Bill Corbett about bad depictions of Cuba in film.
Bonus	"Neverland"	38:13	August 1, 2021
Interview with professor Nelson Valdes about Operation Peter Pan with a brief detour into Hungary, 1956.
Bonus	"The Capital Of Terrorism"	1:08:20	August 15, 2021
Interview with Cuban-American immigration attorney José Pertierra about his experiences with right-wing Cubans in the Miami judicial system and his role in the 1999 international custody dispute of Elián González.
Bonus	"The Most Beautiful Cause"	36:47	August 22, 2021
Overview of Cuba's involvement in Africa with Cuban diplomat Oscar Oramas-Oliva.
Bonus	"Havana (Derangement) Syndrome"	44:37	August 29, 2021
Discussion with guests Helen Yaffe, José Pertierra, and Marta Nuñez Sarmiento about the 2021 Cuban protests. Note: The episode title is a reference to Havana syndrome, a disputed medical condition.
Bonus	"Red-Handed Sleight of Hand"	41:56	September 13, 2021
Overview of the successful CIA-orchestrated 1954 Guatemalan coup d'état that deposed democratically-elected president Jacobo Árbenz and installed the military dictatorship of Carlos Castillo Armas.

==== Soundtrack ====
All music is composed by Brendan James as The Great Vorelli.

Blowback
No.	Title	Length
1.	"Jupiter Missiles"	3:39
2.	"Best & Brightest, Pt. I"	2:01
3.	"Bury the Body and Tell No One"	3:28
4.	"The Fireworks"	2:45
5.	"B.O.P"	2:07
6.	"Anadyr (feat. Robin Hatch)"	3:46
7.	"Love Theme"	4:58
8.	"Best & Brightest, Pt. II"	5:06
9.	"Lo Hicimos"	3:36

=== Season 3 (2022) ===
No.	Title	Running time	Original release date
1	"Stop Me Before I Kill Again"	41:20	July 24, 2022
An introduction to the figures during the Korean War
2	"The Uninvited"	1:11:31	October 1, 2022
A brief history of the Korean peninsula and its relationship with the United States and the Empire of Japan and Korea during World War II.
3	"The Blue House"	1:06:53	October 10, 2022
A look at the brief moment post-World War II that could have led to a unified Korea, but led to the establishment of North Korea and South Korea.
4	"Red Island"	57:42	October 17, 2022
Tensions break out on Jeju Island in South Korea, leading to the Jeju uprising.
5	"Train To Busan"	1:19:13	October 24, 2022
The prelude to the Korean war begins with clashes between North and South Korean forces along the 38th parallel.
6	"National Smile Week"	1:04:19	October 31, 2022
American General Douglas MacArthur begins a counter offensive.
7	"Mao's Poem"	1:04:43	November 7, 2022
The United Nations Command forces led by the United States threaten to cross the Yalu River. As the Korean War rages on, China enters the battlefield.
8	"American Caesar"	1:22:24	November 14, 2022
President Harry S. Truman clashes with General Douglas MacArthur over the use of nuclear weapons along the border between China and North Korea.
9	"No More Targets"	1:14:18	November 21, 2022
The Korean War reaches a stalemate, but the United States continues its aerial bombing of North Korea.
10	"The Host"	1:36:38	November 28, 2022
A temporary ceasefire becomes essentially permanent. No peace treaty between North and South Korea is signed, and the Korean War becomes a dormant war.

==== Season 3 Bonus Episodes ====
No.	Title	Running time	Original release date
Bonus	"On Cinema With Kim Jong-Il"	49:33	July 24, 2022
Discussion with Anna Broinowski about her trip to North Korea, the cinema of the DPRK, and her film "Aim High in Creation".
Bonus	"Another Country Pt. I"	29:38	July 24, 2022
Historian of the Korean War Bruce Cumings on the years of Japanese colonialism and the origins of the Korean War.
Bonus	"The Northmen"	55:42	July 24, 2022
Scholar Suzy Kim, on the nature of the DPRK's revolution, the differences between North and South, and women's role in the revolution.
Bonus	"Another Country Pt. II"	36:24	July 24, 2022
Discussion with Bruce Cummings on the breakout of the war, Taiwan, and the destruction visited on North Korea by the United States.
Bonus	"Might And Right"	57:24	July 24, 2022
Michael Brenes tracks the development of the Cold War economy, and how the Korean War helped solidify America's national security state.
Bonus	"Germinal Pt. I"	1:37:38	July 24, 2022
Thomas Powell, writer and son of journalist John W. Powell, talks about the allegations of US germ warfare and his family's trials during the Korean War.
Bonus	"Living Memory"	1:01:31	July 24, 2022
Journalist Tim Shorrock on the long history of struggle in South Korea, against dictators, military juntas, and the United States.
Bonus	"Prisoners In Paradise"	44:21	July 24, 2022
Scholar Monica Kim talks about the key archetype that came out of the Korean War: the American POW.
Bonus	"Germinal Pt. II"	1:50:50	July 24, 2022
Psychologist and writer Jeff Kaye explains the history of Japan's Unit 731 and allegations of US germ warfare in Korea.
Bonus	"DMZ meets TMZ"	52:24	July 24, 2022
Peace activists and writers Christine Ahn and Elizabeth Beavers talk about more recent US-Korea relations, from the Obama-era to Trump.

==== Soundtrack ====
All music is composed by Brendan James as The Great Vorelli.

The Blue House
No.	Title	Length
1.	"The Blue House"	5:21
2.	"American Caesar"	4:29
3.	"Mao's Poem"	2:37
4.	"Creep State"	2:28
5.	"Teeth Feel Cold"	2:22
6.	"Beautiful and Tasty"	3:24
7.	"Weird Statistics"	3:51
8.	"Seize the Steel"	3:20
9.	"War Trash"	3:12
10.	"The Uninvited"	5:39
11.	"No More Targets"	2:17

=== Season 4 (2023) ===
James announced a fourth season on his Twitter account in December 2022, to be released in Summer 2023. Season four covers Operation Cyclone and its consequences, including the creation of al-Qaeda and the September 11, 2001 attacks.

No.	Title	Running time	Original release date
1	"Snake Eater"	43:34	August 25, 2023
An introduction to the Soviet–Afghan War and the United States backing and training of the Afghan mujahideen.
2	"Bleeders and Dealers"	1:10:32	November 15, 2023
The beginnings of the Soviet-Afghan War.
3	"The Trap"	1:00:56	November 22, 2023
After the Soviet Union invades Afghanistan, the Safari Club (a CIA-backed intelligence group) begins coordinating with the Afghan mujahideen.
4	"They're Yours Now"	1:10:20	November 29, 2023
Operation Cyclone and its consequences terrorize Afghanistan, and the Soviet-Afghan war ends.
5	"We Can Live With That"	1:03:46	December 6, 2023
The rise of the Taliban and their consolidation of power.
6	"Ground Zeroes"	1:03:53	December 13, 2023
Terrorists sponsored by the Taliban being spreading their operations across the world
7	"Guns of the Patriots"	1:05:18	December 20, 2023
In the aftermath of the September 11 attacks, the United States begins the War in Afghanistan.
8	"Sons of Liberty"	1:10:32	December 27, 2023
A deep dive into the use of military contractors during the War in Afghanistan and their consequences.
9	"Peace Walker"	1:10:41	January 3, 2024
President Barack Obama intensifies the use of drone warfare as his administration continues the War in Afghanistan. Despite Obama's promises to wind down the fighting, American bombing — including the Kunduz hospital airstrike — persists.
10	"The Phantom Pain"	59:35	January 10, 2024
President Donald Trump begins negotiations with the Taliban and United States armed forces begin their withdrawal. The Taliban return to power after the Fall of Kabul (2021).

==== Season 4 Bonus Episodes ====
No.	Title	Running time	Original release date
Bonus	"Ahmed Rashid Part I"	32:05	August 25, 2023
First part of an interview with Pakistani journalist Ahmed Rashid.
Bonus	"Malalai Joya"	48:44	August 25, 2023
Interview with Afghan Feminist activist and politician Malalai Joya.
Bonus	"Red Dawn, Red Scorpion"	2:26:36	August 25, 2023
A discussion of the films Red Dawn and Red Scorpion.
Bonus	"Ahmed Rashid Part II"	23:57	August 25, 2023
Second part of an interview with Ahmed Rashid.
Bonus	"Fitzgerald and Gould Part I"	39:02	August 25, 2023
Interview with journalists Paul Fitzgerald and Elizabeth Gould.
Bonus	"Seymour Hersh"	37:07	August 25, 2023
Interview with journalist Seymour Hersh.
Bonus	"Fitzgerald and Gould Part II"	27:29	August 25, 2023
Second part of an interview with Paul Fitzgerald and Elizabeth Gould.
Bonus	"Kill ‘Em All, Let God Sort ‘Em Out"	16:36	August 25, 2023
Discussion of the magazine Soldier of Fortune.
Bonus	"Anatol Lieven"	45:44	August 25, 2023
Interview with scholar Anatol Lieven.
Bonus	"Hassan Abbas"	50:46	August 25, 2023
Interview with scholar Hassan Abbas.

==== Soundtrack ====
All music is composed by Brendan James as The Great Vorelli.

Ravager
No.	Title	Length
1.	"Overworld"	3:25
2.	"Ravager"	3:17
3.	"Box Cutters"	2:05
4.	"The Move"	3:25
5.	"Innerworld"	1:06
6.	"Ouroboros"	3:08
7.	"Safari Club"	3:07
8.	"Bank of Commerce and Credit"	2:10
9.	"Palace Cat"	4:30
10.	"Underworld"	1:55
11.	"The Trap"	4:23

=== Season 5 (2024) ===
No.	Title	Running time	Original release date
1	"The Wolves Are Closing In"	44:42	September 20, 2024
A primer on the United States involvement in Cambodia during the Cold War.
2	"The French Connection"	1:00:56	December 20, 2024
As World War II comes to a close, French Indochina begins rebelling which contributed to the end of the French colonial empire.
3	"Listen to the Thunder"	1:11:05	December 27, 2024
Then Prince Norodom Sihanouk works on keeping Cambodia out of the Vietnam War.
4	"Mad Men"	1:12:16	January 3, 2025
President Richard Nixon and Secretary of State Henry Kissinger begin plans for Operation Menu.
5	"The Last Tango In Paris"	1:06:03	January 10, 2025
Prince Norodom Sihanouk is overthrown during the 1970 Cambodian coup d'état. The newly established Khmer Republic courts the United States' assistance in fighting the Khmer Rouge.
6	"Dream Warriors"	1:11:09	January 17, 2025
A brief history of the Khmer Republic and the end of Richard Nixon's presidency.
7	"Less Than Zero"	1:08:02	January 24, 2025
The Khmer Rouge take control of Cambodia after the Fall of Phnom Penh, cutting it off from the outside world.
8	"Third World War"	1:11:05	January 31, 2025
Tensions between the Khmer Rouge and Vietnam begin to rise, leading to direct conflict.
9	"Le Cercle Rouge"	1:07:36	February 7, 2025
Vietnam overthrows Democratic Kampuchea; the United States begins tacitly supporting the Khmer Rouge. Amidst the Vietnamese occupation of Cambodia, China invades Vietnam, initiating the Sino-Vietnamese War.
10	"The Terrible But Unfinished Story"	1:07:25	February 14, 2025
The monarchy of Norodom Sihanouk is restored and Cambodia begins to rebuild after the Khmer Rouge insurgency.

==== Season 5 Bonus Episodes ====
No.	Title	Running time	Original release date
Bonus	"Elizabeth Becker Part I"	31:55	September 20, 2024
Part one of an interview with journalist Elizabeth Becker author of When the War Was Over
Bonus	"Syndicates"	27:15	September 20, 2024
An overview of drug trafficking in South-East Asia.
Bonus	"Elizabeth Becker Part II"	37:39	September 20, 2024
Part 2 of an interview with journalist Elizabeth Becker.
Bonus	"National Treasure"	19:13	September 20, 2024
Examining the illegal trade of historical artifacts from Cambodia.
Bonus	"Marv Truhe and Perry Pettus"	1:07:26	September 20, 2024
An interview with ex-JAG attorney Marv Truhe and member of the US Air Force Perry Pettus discussing the USS Kitty Hawk riot.
Bonus	"Vu Minh Hoang"	1:45:24	September 20, 2024
An interview with Vu Minh Hoang, professor of history and Vietnam studies at Fulbright University Vietnam and research associate at the Weatherhead East Asian Institute at Columbia University.
Bonus	"Rep. Elizabeth Holtzman"	48:59	September 20, 2024
An interview with former New York Congresswoman Elizabeth Holtzman
Bonus	"Ben Kiernan Part I"	36:21	September 20, 2024
Part one of an interview with professor Ben Kiernan of Yale University
Bonus	"Sy Hersh"	34:58	September 20, 2024
An interview with investigative journalist Seymour Hersh who reported on the My Lai massacre and Operation Menu.
Bonus	"Ben Kiernan Part II"	36:21	September 20, 2024
Part two of an interview with professor Ben Kiernan.

==== Soundtrack ====
All music is composed by Brendan James as The Great Vorelli.

Madman Theory
No.	Title	Length
1.	"Operation Menu"	2:34
2.	"Brother Number One"	2:25
3.	"Pray With Me, Henry"	1:47
4.	"The Wolves Are Closing In"	2:21
5.	"Brother Number Two"	3:43
6.	"Madman Theory"	3:45
7.	"Whoever Did This"	3:27
8.	"Brother Number Three"	1:54

=== Season 6 (2025) ===
No.	Title	Running time	Original release date
1	"The Dead Myth"	46:52	September 22, 2025
An introduction to the sixth season: the story of Angola, Cuba, and apartheid South Africa during the Cold War.
2	"Economy of Terror"	59:45	December 22, 2025
An overview of the Portuguese Empire in southern Africa and the stirrings of nationalism in Angola.
3	"The Stand"	1:15:02	December 29, 2025
Angolan anti-colonial rebels challenge Portugal. Cuba brings its revolution to Africa.
4	"Zulu & Foxbat"	1:15:32	January 5, 2026
South Africa invades. Cuba intervenes. Angola becomes independent.
5	"Kicking the Dog"	1:15:18	January 12, 2026
The MPLA and Jimmy Carter struggle to find their footing. Jonas Savimbi licks his wounds.
6	"Total Onslaught"	1:05:18	January 19, 2026
Carter goes Cold Warrior. Savimbi visits Washington. Angola loses a founding father.
7	"Constellation"	1:03:00	January 26, 2026
Reagan arrives, emboldening South Africa and Savimbi. The MPLA hangs on. Cuba recommits.
8	"Cut Off Their Hands"	1:15:51	February 2, 2026
The Reagan Doctrine puts Angola in the crosshairs as aid to UNITA is uncorked.
9	"Something Big and Bloody"	1:13:16	February 9, 2026
The fate of southern Africa is decided at the Battle of Cuito Cuanavale.
10	"Zero-Sum"	57:53	February 16, 2026
The Cold War ends. Apartheid falls. But Savimbi's war continues.

==== Season 6 Bonus Episodes ====
No.	Title	Running time	Original release date
Bonus	"Distant Neighbors"	26:08	September 29, 2025
A short look at Israel–South Africa relations during apartheid.
Bonus	"António Tomás Part I"	1:00:00	September 29, 2025
Part one of a two-part interview with António Tomás, professor of anthropology and scholar of Angola.
Bonus	"Piero Gleijeses Part I"	1:00:00	September 29, 2025
The first of a two-part interview with historian Piero Gleijeses, author of Visions of Freedom.
Bonus	"Marissa Moorman"	49:24	September 29, 2025
An interview with scholar Marissa Moorman about music and Angolan history.
Bonus	"Chas Freeman"	58:30	September 29, 2025
An interview with former U.S. diplomat Chas Freeman.
Bonus	"António Tomás Part II"	1:08:00	September 29, 2025
The second part of an interview with professor António Tomás.
Bonus	"Piero Gleijeses Part II"	1:00:00	September 29, 2025
The second part of an interview with historian Piero Gleijeses.
Bonus	"Bill Minter"	56:25	September 29, 2025
An interview with Bill Minter, author of Apartheid's Contras.
Bonus	"Negash Abdurahman"	46:27	September 29, 2025
An interview with Negash Abdurahman, director of the short film Cuba in Africa.
Bonus	"Justin Pearce"	1:09:00	September 29, 2025
An interview with Justin Pearce, historian of Central Angola and Southern Africa.

== Reception ==
According to Vince Mancini of UPROXX and Derek Robertson of Politico, Blowback was "painstakingly researched" and didactic in its approach, "bombarding the listener with the host's sturm-und-drang argument about the Iraq War as a portal to hell that directly caused our modern-day political ills". In a comparison of Blowback and Slow Burn, Slate's podcast about the Iraq War, Derek Robertson of Politico described Blowback as "an unapologetically left-wing re-examination of the war's many causes and ongoing effects". Jake Greenberg of Podcast Review wrote that "Blowback is an excellent piece of history, one that documents the misadventures, deceits, and war crimes" of the Iraq War. Podcast Review called the topic of the second season "a tremendous fit for James and Kulwin's style". In a review from Jacobin, Blowback is described as being "a thoroughly contextualized, fully explained, blow-by-blow account of how and why the United States government ginned up a case for war in Iraq — all the junk intelligence, media manipulation, and diplomatic arm-twisting — and what happened when our military got there."

A.E. Gomez of Boing Boing praised season 2, saying "James and Kulwin demonstrate diligent and expansive research, compiling audio interviews and newspaper reports from that time, consulting existing historical monographs, as well as contemporary interviews with participants that shed light on new information as well as complicating the inherited narratives about these wars."

In a review for season 3, James Greig wrote in Jacobin that "Blowback, while interested in excavating history, is ultimately about how these events and strategies still shape politics today and continue to determine which countries the United States positions as villains." Jake Cole, writing for Hyperallergic, emphasizes this, "The voluminous background detail and interest in the far-reaching impacts of foreign policy could easily lend itself to conspiracy-minded extemporization, but James and Kulwin never make an assertion not backed up by considerable evidence. This also armors them against potential backlash to their openly leftist bias."

== See also ==
- United States involvement in regime change
- The Fire This Time – 2002 audio documentary on the history and consequences of the Gulf War and following economic sanctions against Iraq
