= Chapo Trap House =

American socialist political podcast

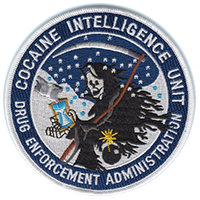
- The logo used by Chapo Trap House is an embroidered patch of the Drug Enforcement Administration's Cocaine Intelligence Unit.
- Genre: Politics; comedy
- Language: English

Cast and voices
- Hosted by: Will Menaker; Matt Christman; Felix Biederman; Amber A'Lee Frost (2016–2022); Virgil Texas (2016–2021)

Production
- Production: Brendan James (2016–2017); Chris Wade (2018–present)
- Length: 60–100 minutes

Publication
- No. of episodes: 1016 (episode list)
- Original release: March 13, 2016
- Updates: Twice-weekly

Related
- Related shows: The Adam Friedland Show; Bad Faith; Blowback; Cum Town; Red Scare (podcast); Street Fight Radio; The West Wing Thing; TrueAnon
- Website: www.chapotraphouse.com

Chapo Trap House (also referred to as Chapo) is an American political comedy podcast launched in March 2016 and hosted by Will Menaker, Felix Biederman, and Matt Christman, with Amber A'Lee Frost joining shortly after launch. It is produced by Chris Wade.

The show provides commentary from a democratic socialist perspective, and its co-hosts are affiliated with the Democratic Socialists of America (DSA). The hosts are critical of both the Republican Party and the Democratic Party, particularly its centrist wing. Chapo supported Bernie Sanders in his first presidential campaign in the 2016 Democratic presidential primaries and his second campaign in the 2020 Democratic presidential primaries. The show's contentious style of left-wing political discourse that eschews civility in favor of casual, blunt, often vulgar expression has given rise to a broader movement called the "dirtbag left", a term coined by later co-host Frost.

The series was originally founded by Menaker, Biederman, and Christman in March 2016, with Brendan James as producer. Frost and Virgil Texas joined in November of that year. James was replaced as producer with Wade in November 2017. In 2018, an imprint of Simon & Schuster published The Chapo Guide to Revolution, co-written by four of the original hosts along with James. The book debuted at number six on The New York Times Best Seller list. Texas left the show in May 2021. Frost took a hiatus for most of 2023 to publish her memoir and audiobook, Dirtbag: Essays. Christman took a hiatus in September 2023 due to complications from a stroke, but rejoined in December 2024.

As of August 2025, the show is the 5th most supported show on Patreon with 43,783 patrons paying $185,529 USD per month total to support the show.

== Content ==
The Chapo hosts and producers identify with radical left-wing politics and frequently deride conservative, neoliberal, moderate, and liberal pundits. Writing for The New York Times, Nikil Saval called Chapo Trap House and its hosts "prime originators of the far left's liberal-bashing." The Pacific Standard wrote:

Contemporary conservatism is the butt of many jokes on Chapo, but the harshest critiques are often saved for the Democratic Party (and for contemporary liberalism more generally). Chapo has managed to strip away the layers standard of political discourse to highlight the brutality behind policies such as "double-tap" airstrikes and for-profit health care.

Biederman said the show's audience is seeking alternatives to liberal media, which he calls "the dominion of either upper-middle-class smugness when it's even the least bit funny and insufferable self-righteousness when it's even the least bit conscious." Similarly, Christman said that leftist perspectives in media tend toward either the "smug above-it-all snark of The Daily Show or the quaver-voiced earnestness of, like, Chris Hedges or something. Neither of those models offer the visceral thrill of listening to people who actually give a shit (as opposed to the wan liberalism of people who are mostly interested in showing how much smarter they are than Republicans)." James said "[it] is not just that people suck, and that the media and politics is gross, but that it doesn’t have to be this way. If it was just, 'Well, this is how it is, let’s just go down laughing,' then they would just be The Daily Show." Menaker has said that Chapo is meant to be in "marked contrast to the utterly humorless and bloodless path that leads many people with liberal or leftist proclivities into the trap of living in constant fear of offending some group that you're not a part of, up to and including the ruling class."

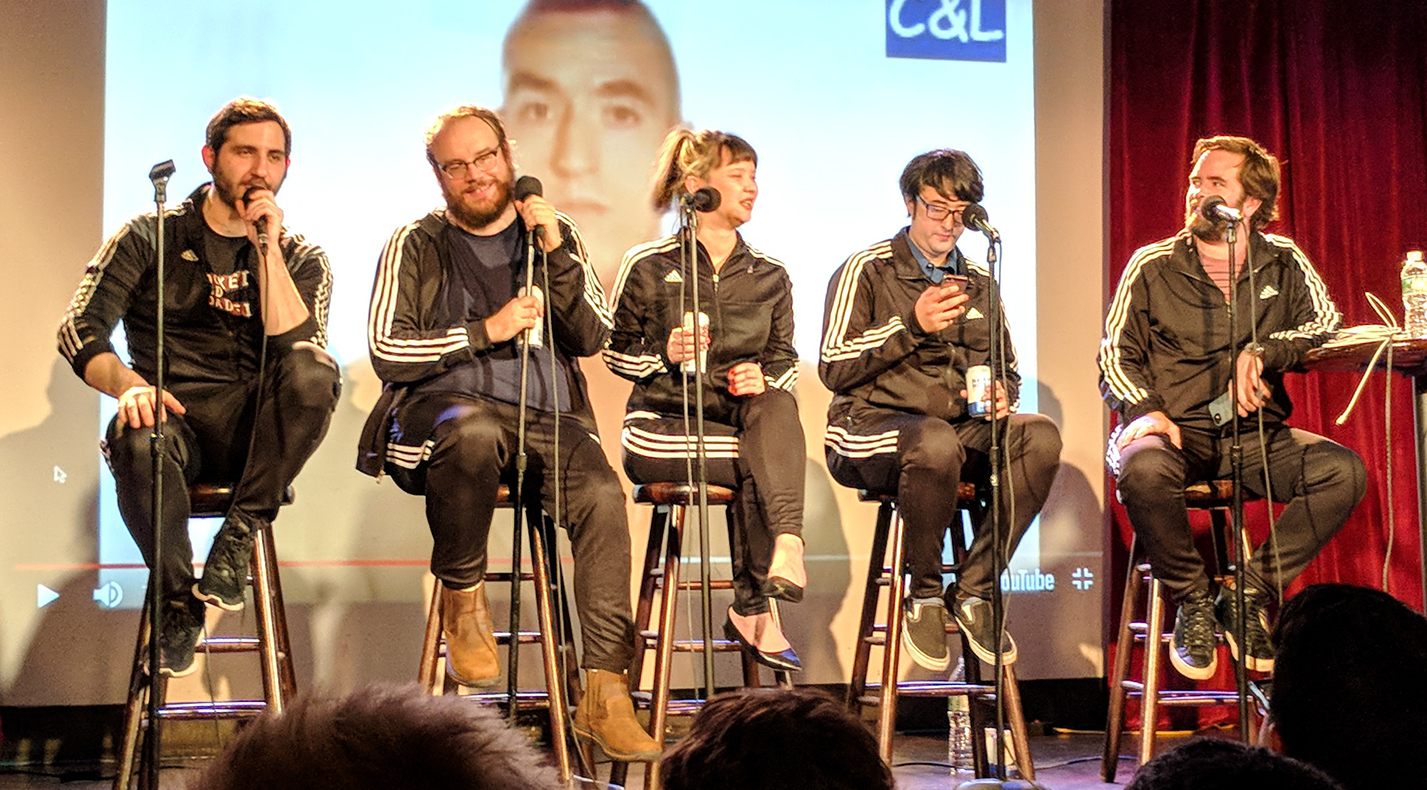
Chapo Trap House hosts Felix Biederman, Matt Christman, Amber A'Lee Frost, Virgil Texas, and Will Menaker (left to right) live at The Bell House in New York City in 2017

Chapo Trap House is dense with inside jokes and hyper-specific references to ongoing political discussion on Twitter. The hosts are associated with Twitter communities called "Left Twitter" and "Weird Twitter," a name used to describe a loose group of Twitter users known for absurdist humor.

=== Format and availability ===
An episode of Chapo Trap House usually lasts between 60 and 80 minutes. Episodes are typically structured with a prepared "cold open," an interview with a guest, and commentary on current events. In post-production, relevant audio samples are interspersed into the episode's discussion. The theme song—and inspiration for the show's title—is "SALUTE 2 EL CHAPO PART 1" by DJ Smokey. The show frequently features a reading series which usually features texts by conservative and neoliberal writers, such as Ross Douthat, Ben Shapiro, Dennis Prager, Megan McArdle and Rod Dreher. Dreher in particular has become a regular staple on the podcast, being featured nearly 30 times. The hosts jokingly offered him a position as co-host, after Dreher lost his position at The American Conservative. A number of these pundits are also featured and critiqued in The Chapo Guide to Revolution.

Weekly free episodes of the show are available via SoundCloud, Spotify, and iTunes, among other services. Subscribers who contribute at least $5 per month via Patreon gain access to additional weekly premium bonus episodes. By May 2017, the show generated more than $60,000 a month from subscribers, and is as of September 2023 the third highest-grossing user on Patreon, earning over $180,000 per month, having once been the highest-grossing user on Patreon. Geek.com cited the show's premium content as an example of a viable revenue model for new podcasters.

=== Special series ===
In addition to the regular podcast episodes, Chapo has released three scripted miniseries focused on history & politics. Hell of Presidents, hosted by Christman and Wade, which details the administration and personality of every president of the United States; Hell on Earth: The Thirty Years' War and the Violent Birth of Capitalism, focusing on the Thirty Years' War and the birth of capitalism, again hosted by Christman and Wade; and Seeking a Fren for the End of the World, hosted by Biederman with writing by Joshua A. Cohen (@ettingermentum) and Spencer Rider, focusing on 'Conservative Inc.', the history of right-wing think tanks and media in the United States. An additional series about the Spanish Civil War by Christman and Wade was planned but cancelled after Christman's stroke. It was released in book form in September 2024 as ¡No Pasarán! Matt Christman's Spanish Civil War. In 2021, Biederman and Christman hosted the series Time For My Stories on the now-defunct podcast platform Stitcher, discussing different TV drama series. In 2025, Biederman began hosting THE PLAYERS CLUB!, a series about video games, with the first season focusing on the Metal Gear franchise.

Hell of Presidents was named as one of the 10 best podcasts of 2021 by Entertainment Weekly. In 2024, Hell on Earth was honored at the Webby Awards in the category Best Limited Series Podcasts.

Additionally, Movie Mindset, hosted by Menaker and Hesse Deni from the Seeking Derangements podcast is an irregular series focused on film reviews including an annual horror film review subseries known as "Ghoulvie Screamset"; and Hinge Points, hosted Christman and Danny Bessner of the American Prestige podcast, focuses on alternate history.

== History ==
=== Background and formation ===
The three founding hosts met online through discussions on the platform formerly known as Twitter (renamed X in 2023) years prior to starting the podcast. Under the usernames @willmenaker (Menaker); @cushbomb (Christman); and @ByYourLogic (Biederman, also formerly @swarthyvillain and @spookymuscleman), they developed followings for their political commentary and have been called "minor Twitter celebrities."

The three first recorded together as guests on an episode of the podcast Street Fight Radio to mock the film 13 Hours: The Secret Soldiers of Benghazi. They had already discussed hosting a show together for some time, and, encouraged by positive reception to their Street Fight appearances, they created Chapo Trap House. They chose the name Chapo Trap House in the first episode as a joking reference to the Mexican drug lord Joaquín "El Chapo" Guzmán and a slang term for a drug house, intending the title to sound like the title of a rap mixtape.

=== Early years ===
The show came to prominence during the 2016 Democratic Party presidential primary contest between former United States Secretary of State Hillary Clinton and United States Senator Bernie Sanders. The first episode was released March 13, 2016 and a Patreon account was launched to support the show's creation in May 2016. The show's left-wing content became popular with supporters of the democratic socialist Sanders. By the first week of August 2016 the show's Patreon reached the top 30 most supported Patreon accounts on the whole platform, just below CANADALAND.

The team behind the podcast expanded from the original three hosts. Vice investigative journalist Brendan James joined as producer after appearing as a guest, and former The Onion writer and twitter personality Virgil Texas and Amber A'Lee Frost joined the show as alternating co-hosts after the 2016 American presidential election. James left the show in November 2017, later being replaced by producer and writer Chris Wade. James became co-host of the Blowback podcast in 2019.

=== The Chapo Guide to Revolution ===
Biederman, Christman, James, Menaker, and Texas authored a satirical book about American politics, The Chapo Guide to Revolution: A Manifesto Against Logic, Facts, and Reason, published in August 2018 under the name Chapo Trap House. It debuted on The New York Times Best Seller list at number 6 under the Hardcover Non-Fiction category and number 7 under the Combined Print & E-Book category.

=== 2020 election ===
During the 2020 United States presidential election cycle, Chapo Trap House interviewed Democratic presidential candidates Marianne Williamson, Andrew Yang, John Delaney, Joe Sestak, Tom Steyer, and Bernie Sanders. In February 2020, The New York Times profiled the group's large live shows in early Democratic Party primary states, noting that they had "morphed into a touring political rally" for the election of Bernie Sanders.

=== Post-2020 changes ===
On June 29, 2020, Reddit banned the unofficial Chapo Trap House subreddit, citing violations of Reddit's new community guidelines and the subreddit's persistent failure to moderate rule-breaking content. The r/The_Donald and r/Cumtown subreddits were banned as well. The hosts of Chapo Trap House had previously repudiated the subreddit.

Texas started co-hosting the Bad Faith podcast with Briahna Joy Gray in September 2020. In May 2021, it was announced that Texas was leaving Chapo Trap House. The podcast's Patreon page described the parting as amicable.

Christman suffered an unspecified medical incident in September 2023, later revealed as a stroke. The hosts announced that Christman would "require a significant period of recovery" and his return to the show was indeterminate. Later that year, Frost returned from a hosting hiatus with the release of her memoir and audiobook, Dirtbag: Essays. In July 2024, Wade announced that Christman's Spanish Civil War episode series, which had been interrupted by his stroke, would be written and released as a self-published book.

In 2025, the group released Year Zero #1: A Chapo Trap House Anthology, a horror anthology comic book published by Bad Egg Publishing. In July 2026, the group released Chunks, a comedy anthology film.

== Hosts ==
=== Will Menaker ===
Will Menaker is one of three co-founders and regular co-hosts of Chapo Trap House. He has been described as the podcast's "planner" and "showrunner," often choosing the topics of discussion for each episode. He was raised in a self-described liberal family on the Upper West Side of New York, composed of himself and his adoptive parents: Katherine Bouton, an editor at The New York Times, and Daniel Menaker, an editor at The New Yorker and Random House. After graduating from Skidmore College, Menaker worked as an assistant editor at Liveright, a W.W. Norton imprint, but left in 2016 when Chapo encountered commercial success. Menaker has stated that the Iraq War and endorsements of the war by Congressional Democrats were the catalyst for his turning away from being a liberal Democrat to left-wing and socialist politics.

Menaker is in a relationship with The Intercept journalist Katherine Krueger, a frequent guest on the podcast. In 2019 Krueger and Menaker were sued by former Donald Trump 2016 presidential campaign spokesman Jason Miller over a Splinter News article written by Krueger regarding allegations against Miller, and Menaker calling Miller a "rat-faced baby killer" on Twitter. Judges in New York and Florida dismissed Miller's suits and ordered him to pay the legal fees of Gizmodo (which owns Splinter News).

=== Matt Christman ===
Matt Christman, Chapo co-founder and co-host, grew up in the Rust Belt town of Manitowoc, Wisconsin. He described his household as essentially apolitical; his father listened to conservative talk radio and identified as a Republican, while his mother never outwardly expressed any political views; both avoided the topic of politics in discussions. His father died during his junior year of high school. Before his high school graduation, Christman experienced a sudden onset of severe back pain with no readily apparent external cause. He underwent an intensive diagnostic process (including a spinal tap and MRI scans), surgery, and months of physical therapy. He made a partial recovery but his condition progressed into Brown-Séquard syndrome. As a result, he continues to walk with a limp. In an interview with CounterPunch, Christman spoke about his experience and how it had impacted the course of his life and development of his worldview:

I left the hospital in a wheelchair and then I spent the next four/five months rehabbing to be able to stand and walk. And I went from having braces on both of my legs to just one, and I went from a wheelchair to the braces, to crutches, to a cane, within six months. Had to do a bunch of horrible, really grody stuff to my body. And at the end of it, I kind of hit a plateau where I now have a limp, still, because I have something called Browns-Sequard syndrome [sic], which is where the damage to your spine affects two halves differently. So my right leg is normal in terms of strength but it's completely numb all the time, like it's asleep. And then my left leg is very weak, and I drag it. It's been that way since this happened. Amber's theory is you see white males who are committed Leftists, and if they're serious about it, there’s something that happened that gave them a sense of real vulnerability. They don't take for granted their position anymore. I never thought about it that way. It was never a conscious thing. But when I look at my interests and my milieu, I think that theory is kind of persuasive. I just kind of laid low and felt vulnerable.

Christman attended Carroll University in Wisconsin. He met his first wife in Milwaukee and moved with her to Ann Arbor, Michigan where she worked as an academic librarian. Christman was unable to find work himself, describing himself as an "unemployable failguy". A former active member of the Democratic Socialists of America (DSA), he participated in founding a local chapter when he lived in Cincinnati, Ohio. In 2020, he met his current wife Amber Rollo. They have one child together.

Christman suffered a stroke in September 2023. He returned to the show in December 2024; as of January 2025 he was "not fully recovered" but was "easing back into work."

=== Felix Biederman ===
Felix Charles Biederman, Chapo co-founder and co-host, was raised in the affluent, historically liberal neighborhood of Hyde Park in Chicago, and cites his upbringing in the city as motivating his criticism of the "establishment" Democratic party. After attending the University of St. Thomas in Minnesota, he moved to New York to work as a freelance writer, often covering mixed-martial-arts for Deadspin and the New York Observer. Together with Texas and Blake Zeff, he co-created the fictional centrist political pundit Carl Diggler for CAFE, also voicing him on his in-character podcast The DigCast. Biederman has cited Native Son by Richard Wright and Master of the Senate by Robert Caro as some of his most influential books. In 2018, Biederman wrote and narrated Fighting in the Age of Loneliness, a five-part documentary about MMA directed by Jon Bois of SB Nation.

=== Amber A'Lee Frost ===
Amber A'Lee Frost is a writer and musician who was a regular guest in the first year of Chapo, and officially joined as a co-host in November 2016. She was raised in Indiana, attending high school in Pittsboro. In 2011 she moved to New York, where she worked for the Working Families Party, the Democratic Socialists of America, and then Bernie Sanders's 2016 presidential campaign. She has written for Columbia Journalism Review, Jacobin, The Baffler and Current Affairs. Frost also taught a freshman writing course at New York University. Her first book of essays, Dirtbag, was published by St. Martin's Press in 2023. She also contributed to Rosa Luxemburg: Her Life and Legacy (2013) and False Choices: The Faux Feminism of Hillary Rodham Clinton (Verso, 2016).

== Reception ==
Avid fans of Chapo Trap House are called Grey Wolves, a joke referencing the neo-fascist, nationalist Turkish movement of the same name.

A review of the second episode in The A.V. Club called the show "tremendously funny" and said "it feels like an absolutely essential listen." The reviewer cautioned prospective listeners that the show's left political perspective and amateur audio quality are "not for everyone," but said the hosts' "energy and desire to improve the political landscape of this country is not only unparalleled, but also contagious: if listening to this podcast doesn't make you want to become a more politically engaged person, it's hard to imagine what will." A subsequent A.V. Club review of the seventh episode noted the show's marked improvements in audio quality and the hosts' newfound confidence and flow in discussion, while retaining the "raw energy and urgency that has fueled the show from the get-go." The publication eventually named the episode of the show following the election of Donald Trump one of the best individual podcast episodes of the year 2016.

Mediaite called the show "consistently, absurdly funny and impressively literate on the diverse subjects it tackles," citing the hosts' "breadth of awareness about (seemingly) everything that's been published in every media outlet for the past few decades, and a depth of knowledge on various, arcane subjects." Paste described the show as "not deliberately offensive, but unapologetically honest ... so hilarious and delightfully vulgar I can barely stand it." Pacific Standard wrote, "Whether you think Chapo Trap House and its fans are bullies or righteously hilarious seems to come down to whether you think calling a Washington Post reporter 'smooth brain' is an acceptable move within the political discourse." The Irish Times commended its "more bracing and venomous approach to politics" than other podcasts and named the show one of the best podcasts of 2016.

The Advocate praised the show for its "scathing, hilarious, erudite analysis on politics and media from a far-left perspective," and favorably analogized the thrill of listening to how Alex Jones and Rush Limbaugh make their right-wing fans feel. Comedy website Splitsider recommended the episode featuring video editor Vic Berger, who did an in-depth interview about his surreal Vine and YouTube shorts covering the 2016 presidential election season.

In a 2016 column, Robby Soave of libertarian magazine Reason criticized the show as "apparently a group therapy session for Bernie bros." Soave wrote in reaction to host Will Menaker commenting on one of his tweets, saying that he believed Menaker had a hypocritical view of free speech rights, and said the hosts "would gleefully applaud the silencing of everyone to their right." Soave later appeared as a guest on a premium episode of the podcast, "17 – The Road to Soavedom," in which he debated the hosts on freedom of speech in the media and the viability of public education.

The original version of the 2019 role-playing video game Disco Elysium features voice-acting cameos from Biederman, Christman, Menaker, and Texas. The creators of the game, Studio ZA/UM, lauded the podcast on Twitter, saying they had been "huge [Chapo] fans since the beginning." These voices were later replaced when the game was patched to Disco Elysium: Final Cut on PC and were never present for the console versions.

In 2025, Biederman and Menaker had cameo appearances in the film Castration Movie Anthology ii. The Best of Both Worlds, directed by Louise Weard. The podcast is credited for bringing the slang words "failson" and "chud" into prominence.

=== Political influence ===
In March 2019, it was revealed former U.S. Senator from Alaska Mike Gravel filed for an exploratory committee regarding a possible 2020 presidential campaign after being convinced to run by students David Oks, Henry Williams, and Elijah Emery, who learned about Gravel from Chapo Trap House. Gravel's formerly dormant Twitter account soon went viral after being used by the students to attack various politicians, including Democrats Amy Klobuchar, Cory Booker, Joe Biden, and Kamala Harris, in an effort to move discussion of the 2020 Democratic presidential candidates leftward. The Mike Gravel campaign performed an AMA on the r/Chapotraphouse subreddit on April 8, the day the campaign officially launched.

Italian weekly news magazine L'espresso attributed Chapo Trap House listenership with rising membership in the Democratic Socialists of America throughout early 2019, saying the podcast is "[a] real and physical program, which is bringing thousands of young Americans to subscribing themselves to the DSA: the young Democratic Socialists of America."

=== Critique of the Democratic Party ===
During the 2020 Democratic Party presidential primaries, The New York Times profiled the Chapo Trap House hosts' characterizations of candidates challenging Vermont Senator and presidential candidate Bernie Sanders, the hosts' preferred candidate. The hosts called supporters of former Vice President Joe Biden "gelatinous 100-year-olds", referred to former Mayor Pete Buttigieg as "a bloodless asexual", and said former Mayor Michael Bloomberg should lose "so badly that this midget gremlin won't even have a shot even with a trillion dollars." When the hosts mentioned the name of Massachusetts Senator and presidential candidate Elizabeth Warren during a live event, the crowd hissed. According to the article, "the Sanders campaign maintains a close relationship with the podcast. His senior adviser, David Sirota, and his national press secretary, Briahna Joy Gray, have also been on the podcast." Describing the podcast's simultaneous intense criticism of the Warren 2020 presidential campaign and its associations with the Sanders campaign, Zach Beauchamp of Vox wrote, "If Sanders's fans are really serious about helping their guy, they need to think carefully about whether what they're doing is actually working."

== See also ==
- List of Chapo Trap House episodes
- Political podcast
