= Korea–United States relations =

Korea–United States relations may refer to:

- North Korea–United States relations
- South Korea–United States relations
