= Eli Valley =

American cartoonist and author (born 1970)

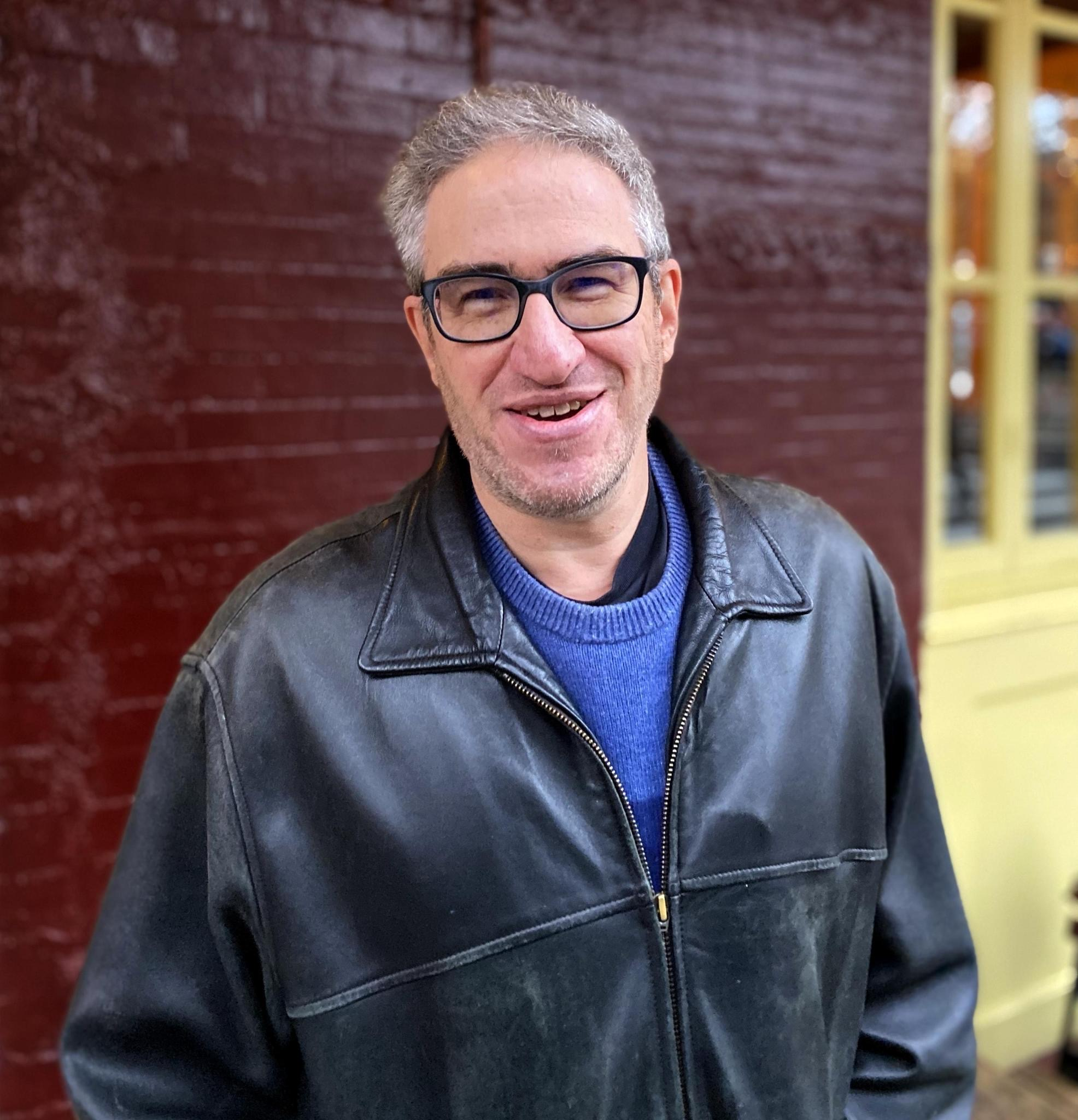
- Valley in March 2023
- Born: Eli Valley; 1970 (age 55–56); Rhode Island, U.S.
- Education: Cornell University
- Occupations: Cartoonist and author

Eli Valley is an American cartoonist and author. He is best known for his political cartoons, which often feature prominent politicians, businesspeople, and media personalities.

== Early life and education ==
Eliezer Valley was born in Rhode Island, and grew up in Troy, New York, and New Jersey. His father was a Conservative rabbi, while his mother was secular. His parents divorced when he was young. Valley has one sister. He attended Jewish day school until 8th grade, and received an undergraduate degree in English from Cornell University. While at Cornell, Valley contributed cartoons to The Cornell Daily Sun, the student newspaper.

== Career ==
In 1999, Valley published a travel book, The Great Jewish Cities of Central and Eastern Europe: A Travel Guide and Resource Book to Prague, Warsaw, Crakow, and Budapest.

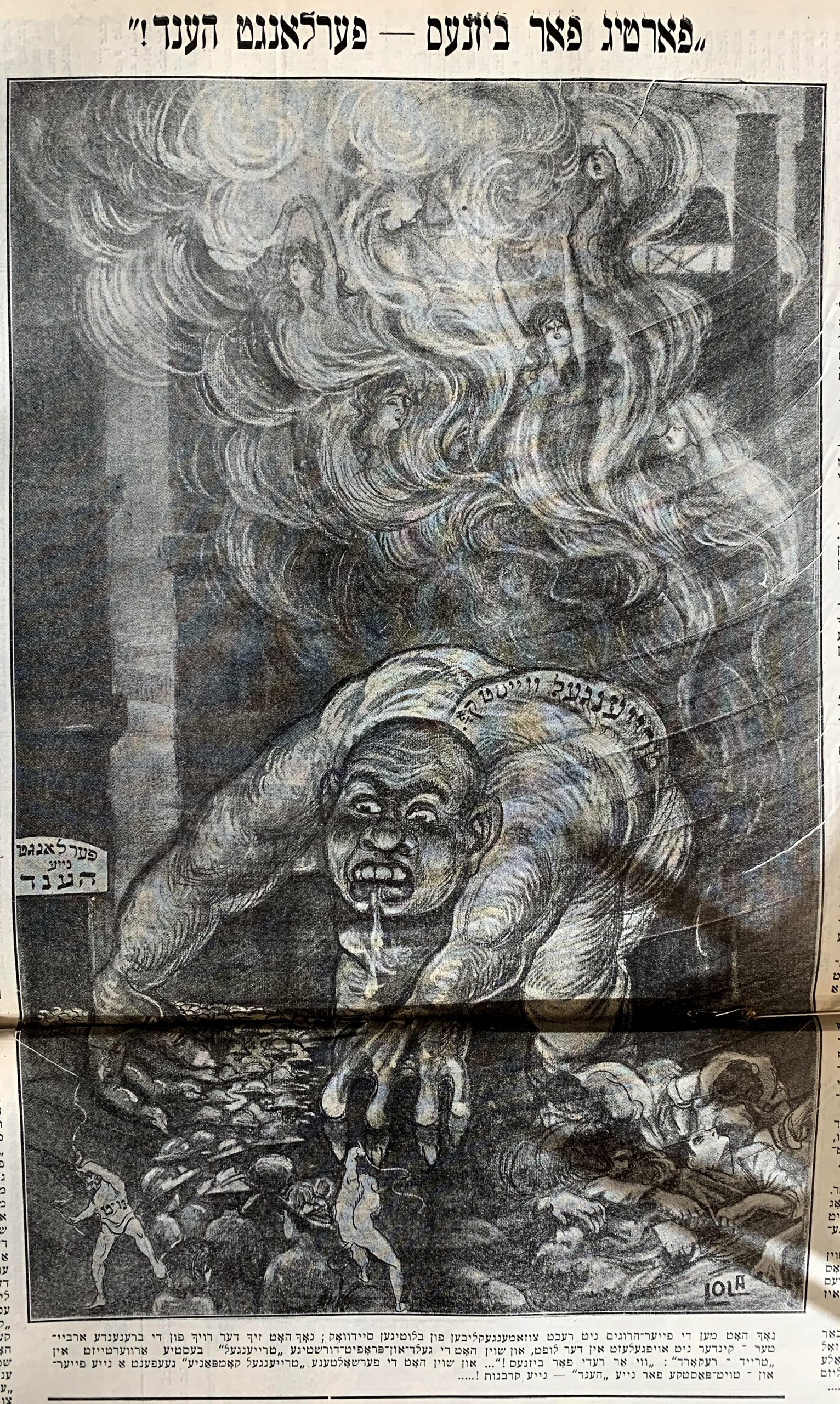
Valley has cited early 20th-century Jewish artist Leon Israel (example work pictured) as an influence.

Valley was artist-in-residence at The Forward from 2011 to 2013. His cartoons have also been published in The New Republic, Jewcy, +972 Magazine, The Village Voice and Gawker. In October 2013, after Valley satirized Anti-Defamation League (ADL) national director Abraham Foxman as an antisemite for his antagonism toward anti-Zionist Jews, The Forward was inundated with calls by irate readers, and Foxman pressured the newspaper to stop publishing Valley's work.

In 2017, Valley published Diaspora Boy: Comics on Crisis in America and Israel (2017, OR Books), a collection of comics and essays exploring Jewish identity and the relationship of American Jews with Israel. In The Los Angeles Review of Books, Nathan Goldman wrote, "The book is not only a towering artistic achievement and a disturbing chronicle of American Jewry's relationship to Israel over the last 10 years, but also a battle cry for a resurgent American Jewish left in a harrowing time of far-right power in the United States and Israel."

Valley's "Schlonged!," about Donald Trump's obsession with size, was selected for The Best American Comics 2017 by USA Today.

Valley contributed illustrations to The Chapo Guide to Revolution. Writing in The Pittsburgh Post-Gazette, Will Tomer said the book resembled "an old-school MAD Magazine, thanks in part to the stomach-turning illustrations of Eli Valley."

Writing in Vulture in 2019, Abraham Riesman has referred to Valley's work as "expressionist [and] woodcut-esque."

In March 2019, Valley drew a cartoon satirizing Meghan McCain's appropriation of Jewish identity after McCain wept during an appearance on The View while castigating U.S. representative Ilhan Omar as an antisemite for her remarks about Israel. McCain called the cartoon "one of the most anti-semitic things I've ever seen," which caused controversy and discussion about Christian Zionist allegations of antisemitism.

== Personal life ==
After graduating from college, Valley moved to Prague for four and a half years. Valley lives in the East Village, Manhattan as of 2012.

== Bibliography ==
=== Non-fiction ===
- Great Jewish Cities of Central and Eastern Europe: A Travel Guide & Resource Book to Prague, Warsaw, Crakow & Budapest (1999)

=== Collections ===
- Diaspora Boy: Comics on Crisis in America and Israel (2017, OR Books)
