= List of United States stand-up comedians =

This is a list of stand-up comedians from the United States.

== A ==
- Corey Adam
- Orny Adams
- Ahmed Ahmed
- Franklyn Ajaye
- Carlos Alazraqui
- Rory Albanese
- Max Alexander
- Mo Alexander
- Ted Alexandro
- Fred Allen
- Steve Allen
- Tim Allen
- Woody Allen
- Cristela Alonzo
- Rabbi Bob Alper
- Bob Altman
- Jeff Altman
- Amazing Johnathan
- Martin Amini
- Max Amini
- Louie Anderson
- Eric André
- Andy Andrist
- Aziz Ansari
- Ant
- Craig Anton
- David A. Arnold
- Cliff Arquette
- Aaron Aryanpur
- Dave Attell
- Rick Aviles

== B ==
- Maria Bamford
- Nate Bargatze
- Robert Baril
- Ike Barinholtz
- Arj Barker
- Roseanne Barr
- Chuck Barris
- Andrea Barber
- Todd Barry
- Rob Bartlett
- Greg Behrendt
- W. Kamau Bell
- Richard Belzer
- Owen Benjamin
- Ron Bennington
- Jack Benny
- Doug Benson
- Milton Berle
- Shelley Berman
- Sandra Bernhard
- Matt Besser
- Michelle Biloon
- Mike Birbiglia
- Joey Bishop
- Lewis Black
- Michael Ian Black
- Chris Bliss
- Josh Blue
- Ed Bluestone
- Mike Bocchetti
- Alonzo Bodden
- Elayne Boosler
- Joel Kim Booster
- Alex Borstein
- Wayne Brady
- Joey Bragg
- John Branyan
- Creed Bratton
- Matt Braunger
- Kurt Braunohler
- Kevin Brennan
- Neal Brennan
- David Brenner
- Jim Breuer
- Janine Brito
- Dylan Brody
- Mel Brooks
- Bruce Bruce
- Lenny Bruce
- Andy Bumatai
- River Butcher
- Michelle Buteau
- King Kong Bundy
- Hannibal Buress
- Carol Burnett
- Bo Burnham
- George Burns
- Bill Burr
- Brett Butler
- Red Buttons
- John Byner
- Steve Byrne

== C ==
- Louis C.K.
- Frank Caliendo
- Bryan Callen
- Godfrey Cambridge
- Derrick Cameron
- Lee Camp
- Nick Cannon
- Mario Cantone
- John Caparulo
- John Caponera
- Scott Capurro
- Drew Carey
- George Carlin
- Jerrod Carmichael
- Adam Carolla
- Jim Carrey
- Rodney Carrington
- Carrot Top
- Darren Carter
- Jack Carter
- Dana Carvey
- John Crist
- Cliff Cash
- Kyle Cease
- Cedric the Entertainer
- Wyatt Cenac
- Dave Chappelle
- Jay Chanoine
- Michael Che
- Jocelyn Chia
- Whitney Chitwood
- Henry Cho
- Margaret Cho
- Tommy Chong
- Blake Clark
- Andrew Dice Clay
- Kate Clinton
- Jerry Clower
- Deon Cole
- Bobby Collins
- Kaitlin Colombo
- Sarah Colonna
- Ray Combs
- Myron Cohen
- Tim Conway
- Dane Cook
- Brian Copeland
- Irwin Corey
- Pete Correale
- Rebecca Corry
- Bill Cosby
- Dave Coulier
- Ryan Cownie
- Lavell Crawford
- Barry Crimmins
- Norm Crosby
- David Cross
- Trae Crowder
- Billy Crystal
- Whitney Cummings
- Dan Cummins

== D ==
- Andrew Daly
- Godfrey Danchimah
- Rodney Dangerfield
- Chad Daniels
- Jim David
- Larry David
- Dov Davidoff
- Pete Davidson
- Jeff Davis
- Nore Davis
- Sid Davis
- DeRay Davis
- Frank DeCaro
- Ellen DeGeneres
- Bianca Del Rio
- Rob Delaney
- Lea DeLaria
- Chris D'Elia
- Jessica Delfino
- Frank Delima
- Joe DeRosa
- Mike DeStefano
- Dustin Diamond
- Joey Diaz
- Vic DiBitetto
- Andy Dick
- Phyllis Diller
- Tim Dillon
- Nick DiPaolo
- Andrew Dismukes
- Chris DiStefano
- Jimmy Dore
- Jon Dore
- Jeff Dunham
- Kyle Dunnigan
- Jimmy Durante
- Will Durst
- Shelley Duvall
- Jeff Dye

== E ==
- Earthquake
- Ian Edwards
- Sally Edwards
- Ray Ellin
- Francis Ellis (comedian)
- Bill Engvall
- Mike Epps
- Felipe Esparza
- Cameron Esposito
- Susie Essman
- Jade Esteban Estrada
- Charles Esten
- Bridget Everett

== F ==
- Jimmy Fallon
- Chris Farley
- Mitch Fatel
- Frank Fay (American actor)
- Wayne Federman
- Fortune Feimster
- Rachel Feinstein
- Craig Ferguson
- Adam Ferrara
- Will Ferrell
- Tina Fey
- Totie Fields
- Christian Finnegan
- Kevin Fitzgerald
- Greg Fitzsimmons
- Maile Flanagan
- Charles Fleischer
- Jim Florentine
- Mick Foley
- Will Forte
- John Fox
- Kirk Fox
- Jeff Foxworthy
- Jamie Foxx
- Redd Foxx
- Pablo Francisco
- Will Franken
- Travon Free
- Adam Friedland
- Judah Friedlander
- Jena Friedman
- Paul Frisbie
- John Fugelsang
- Ron Funches

== G ==
- Jim Gaffigan
- Zach Galifianakis
- Gallagher
- Billy Gardell
- Brother Dave Gardner
- Jeff Garlin
- Janeane Garofalo
- Teri Garr
- Brad Garrett
- Steve Gerben
- Chris Gethard
- Shane Gillis
- Greg Giraldo
- Adele Givens
- Nikki Glaser
- Todd Glass
- Ben Gleib
- Donald Glover
- George Gobel
- Godfrey
- Elon Gold
- Judy Gold
- Whoopi Goldberg
- Julie Goldman
- Bobcat Goldthwait
- Bob Golub
- Luis J. Gomez
- Marga Gomez
- Eddie Gossling
- Gilbert Gottfried
- Dana Gould
- Shecky Greene
- Dick Gregory
- James Gregory
- David Alan Grier
- Eddie Griffin
- Kathy Griffin
- Nick Griffin
- Andy Griffith
- Gary Gulman
- Geechy Guy

== H ==
- Buddy Hackett
- Tiffany Haddish
- Bill Hader
- Brian Haley
- Stavros Halkias
- Arsenio Hall
- Rich Hall
- Neil Hamburger
- Ashley Hamilton
- Darrell Hammond
- Stanley Myron Handelman
- Chelsea Handler
- Rhonda Hansome
- Chris Hardwick
- Johnny Hardwick
- Ray Harrington
- Ian Patrick Harris
- Ralph Harris
- Robin Harris
- Tim Harmston
- Kevin Hart
- Adam Hartle
- Phil Hartman
- Steve Harvey
- Ian Harvie
- Drew Hastings
- Allan Havey
- Tim Hawkins
- Mitch Hedberg
- Grace Helbig
- Bill Hicks
- René Hicks
- Steve Higgins
- Melinda Hill
- Mishu Hilmy
- Tony Hinchcliffe
- John Hodgman
- Steve Hofstetter
- Corey Holcomb
- Pete Holmes
- Bob Hope
- Lil Rel Howery
- D.L. Hughley
- Daniel Humbarger
- Reginald D. Hunter
- David Huntsberger

== I ==
- Eddie Ifft
- Gabriel Iglesias
- Dom Irrera

== J ==
- Clinton Jackson
- Kevin James
- Richard Jeni
- Ken Jeong
- Anthony Jeselnik
- Geri Jewell
- Maz Jobrani
- Jake Johannsen
- Anjelah Johnson
- Leslie Jones
- Orlando Jones
- Quincy Jones
- Leslie Jordan
- Jesse Joyce
- David Juskow

== K ==
- Aron Kader
- Madeline Kahn
- Myq Kaplan
- Aaron Karo
- Moshe Kasher
- Jackie Kashian
- Andy Kaufman
- Robert Kelly
- Jamie Kennedy
- Tom Kenny
- Keegan-Michael Key
- Taran Killam
- Laurie Kilmartin
- Jamie Kilstein
- Jimmy Kimmel
- Kyle Kinane
- Andy Kindler
- Alan King
- Sam Kinison
- Jen Kirkman
- Jonathan Kite
- Robert Klein
- Jordan Klepper
- Don Knotts
- Chris Knutson
- Rebekah Kochan
- David Koechner
- Hari Kondabolu
- Lynne Koplitz
- Harvey Korman
- Michael Kosta
- Jo Koy
- Bert Kreischer
- Nick Kroll
- Esther Ku

== L ==
- Judson Laipply
- Leah Lamarr
- Phil LaMarr
- Lisa Lampanelli
- Lisa Landry
- Artie Lange
- Larry the Cable Guy
- Jay Larson
- Lynn Lavner
- Eddie Lawrence
- Mike Lawrence
- Martin Lawrence
- Vicki Lawrence
- Denis Leary
- Mike Lebovitz
- Bobby Lee
- Natasha Leggero
- John Leguizamo
- Tom Lehrer
- Carol Leifer
- Jay Leno
- Darryl Lenox
- Brian Leonard
- Jack E. Leonard
- Lashonda Lester
- David Letterman
- Emily Levine
- Kristine Levine
- Bob Levy
- Dan Levy
- Joe E. Lewis
- Richard Lewis
- Leslie Liao
- Wendy Liebman
- Joe List
- Rich Little
- Rob Little
- Daniel Lobell
- Jay London
- George Lopez
- Dave Losso
- Jason Love
- Loni Love
- Jon Lovitz
- Kenny and Keith Lucas
- Luenell
- Drew Lynch
- Stephen Lynch
- Paul Lynde

== M ==
- Moms Mabley
- Bernie Mac
- Norm Macdonald
- Mary Mack
- April Macie
- Chris Maddock
- Kathleen Madigan
- Al Madrigal
- Bill Maher
- Maija
- Keith Malley
- Joe Mande
- Sebastian Maniscalco
- Cheech Marin
- Bob Marley
- Marc Maron
- Steve Martin
- Demetri Martin
- Marilyn Martinez
- Jackie Martling
- Matt Mathews
- Jackie Mason
- Shane Mauss
- Etta May
- Ralphie May
- Wendy Maybury
- Pat McAfee
- Melissa McCarthy
- Fancy Ray McCloney
- Julian McCullough
- Heather McDonald
- Michael McDonald
- Jonny McGovern
- Joel McHale
- Kate McKinnon
- Kevin Meaney
- Anne Meara
- Doug Mellard
- Carlos Mencia
- Russ Meneve
- Kurt Metzger
- Seth Meyers
- Kate Micucci
- Dennis Miller
- George Miller
- Larry Miller
- Sam Miller
- T.J. Miller
- Hasan Minhaj
- Dan Mintz
- Eugene Mirman
- Finesse Mitchell
- Kel Mitchell
- Jay Mohr
- Mo'Nique
- Kelly Monteith
- Lou Moon
- Paul Mooney
- Rudy Ray Moore
- Trevor Moore
- Dave Mordal
- Elliott Morgan
- Tracy Morgan
- Brent Morin
- Preacher Moss
- Kevin Moyers
- Bobby Moynihan
- John Mulaney
- Gary Mule Deer
- Nick Mullen
- Charlie Murphy
- Eddie Murphy
- Morgan Murphy
- Noel Murphy

== N ==
- Jim Nabors
- Aparna Nancherla
- Kumail Nanjiani
- Bob Nelson
- Bob Newhart
- Dustin Nickerson
- Trevor Noah
- Lance Norris
- Jim Norton
- Tig Notaro
- B. J. Novak
- Mark Normand

== O ==
- Big Jay Oakerson
- Sammy Obeid
- Dean Obeidallah
- Conan O'Brien
- Bob Odenkirk
- Richard O'Donnell (playwright)
- Rosie O'Donnell
- Nick Offerman
- Paul Ogata
- Patrice O'Neal
- Andrew Orvedahl
- Patton Oswalt
- Cheri Oteri
- Rick Overton
- Gary Owen

== P ==
- LaWanda Page
- Tom Papa
- Jimmy Pardo
- Clifton Powell
- Kam Patterson
- Nikki Payne
- Minnie Pearl
- Jordan Peele
- Eddie Pepitone
- Joe Pera
- Chelsea Peretti
- Dwayne Perkins
- Tammy Pescatelli
- Russell Peters
- Jay Pharoah
- Emo Philips
- Henry Phillips
- John Pinette
- Aubrey Plaza
- Amy Poehler
- Tommy Pope
- Chris Porter
- Brian Posehn
- Paula Poundstone
- Dante Powell
- Amber Preston
- Marc Price
- Freddie Prinze
- Greg Proops
- Paul Provenza
- Kelly Pryce
- Richard Pryor

== Q ==
- Adam Quesnell
- Colin Quinn

== R ==
- Gilda Radner
- Mary Lynn Rajskub
- Steve Rannazzisi
- Donnell Rawlings
- Adam Ray
- Jonah Ray
- Jasper Redd
- Jon Reep
- Brian Regan
- Dennis Regan
- Carl Reiner
- Paul Reiser
- Alex Reymundo
- Tom Rhodes
- Michael Richards
- Don Rickles
- Rob Riggle
- Matt Rife
- Jason Ritter
- John Ritter
- Joan Rivers
- Tony T. Roberts
- Jeanne Robertson
- Craig Robinson
- Phoebe Robinson
- Chris Rock
- Paul Rodriguez
- Joe Rogan
- Seth Rogen
- Ray Romano
- Freddie Roman
- Jeffrey Ross
- Ben Roy
- Rita Rudner
- Chris Rush
- Nipsey Russell
- Tommy Ryman

== S ==
- Bob Saget
- Mort Sahl
- Mark Saltveit
- Tony Sam
- Tim Sample
- Brian Stepanek
- Johnny A. Sanchez
- Adam Sandler
- Andrew Santino
- Edwin San Juan
- Horatio Sanz
- Will Sasso
- Evan Sayet
- Kristen Schaal
- Lewis Schaffer
- Robert Schimmel
- Rob Schneider
- Andrew Schulz
- Lenny Schultz
- Amy Schumer
- Rory Scovel
- Tom Segura
- Jerry Seinfeld
- Ari Shaffir
- Garry Shandling
- Rick Shapiro
- Derek Sheen
- Brad Sherwood
- Iliza Shlesinger
- Ron Shock
- Craig Shoemaker
- Martin Short
- Jimmy Shubert
- Ritch Shydner
- Sarah Silverman
- Red Skelton
- Randy and Jason Sklar
- Brad Slaight
- Tim Slagle
- Bobby Slayton
- Dulcé Sloan
- Yakov Smirnoff
- DeAnne Smith
- Margaret Smith
- Owen H.M. Smith
- J.B. Smoove
- Dick Smothers
- Tom Smothers
- Carrie Snow
- Dan Soder
- Kira Soltanovich
- Sommore
- Freddy Soto
- David Spade
- Aries Spears
- Doug Stanhope
- Steve-O
- Brody Stevens
- Jon Stewart
- Mateen Stewart
- Ryan Stiles
- Jerry Stiller
- Brad Stine
- Fred Stoller
- Dave Stone
- Larry Storch
- Ryan Stout
- David Strassman
- Jason Sudeikis
- Nicole Sullivan
- Jiaoying Summers
- Nick Swardson
- Julia Sweeney
- Steve Sweeney
- Wanda Sykes

== T ==
- Danny Tamberelli
- Tim Tayag
- Johnny Taylor, Jr.
- Judy Tenuta
- Danny Thomas
- Warren Thomas
- Nick Thune
- Baratunde Thurston
- Jimmy Tingle
- Christopher Titus
- Adrianne Tolsch
- Lily Tomlin
- Taylor Tomlinson
- Paul F. Tompkins
- Daniel Tosh
- Robert Townsend
- Rosie Tran
- Fred Travalena
- Greg Travis
- Chris Tucker
- Mark Twain
- Aisha Tyler

== U ==
- Sheryl Underwood
- Azhar Usman

== V ==
- Paul Varghese
- Baron Vaughn
- Jackie Vernon
- Theo Von
- Rich Vos

== W ==
- Jimmie Walker
- George Wallace
- Greg Walloch
- Brendon Walsh
- Keith Wann
- Brandon Wardell
- Reggie Watts
- Damon Wayans
- Keenen Ivory Wayans
- Marlon Wayans
- Shawn Wayans
- Brent Weinbach
- Stephnie Weir
- Suzanne Westenhoefer
- Ron White
- JJ Whitehead
- Charles Wieand
- Mike Wiebe
- Brad Williams
- Harland Williams
- Katt Williams
- Robin Williams
- Dave Williamson
- Taylor Williamson
- Debra Wilson
- Flip Wilson
- Michael Winslow
- Jonathan Winters
- Mark Wirtz
- Harris Wittels
- Michelle Wolf
- Dennis Wolfberg
- Ali Wong
- Roy Wood Jr.
- Steven Wright

== Y ==
- Dwight York
- Bill Young
- Henny Youngman

== Z ==
- Sasheer Zamata
- Bob Zany
- Maysoon Zayid
- Jenny Zigrino

== See also ==
- List of New York Improv comedians
- List of stand-up comedians
