= Comedy award =

A Comedy award can refer to numerous awards given for achievement in comedy, including:

- The Comedy Awards
- American Comedy Awards
- British Comedy Awards
- German Comedy Award
- Edinburgh Comedy Awards
