= Jason Love =

Jason Love may refer to:

- Jason Love (comedian)
- Jason Love (literary character), created by James Leasor
- Jason Love (basketball) (born 1987), American basketball player
- Jason Love (footballer), Australian rules footballer
