= Delco =

Delco may refer to:

== Places ==
- Delaware County, Pennsylvania
- Delaware County, Ohio
- Delaware County, Iowa
- Delta County, Colorado
- Delta County, Michigan
- Delco, North Carolina

== Companies ==
- ACDelco
- Delco Electronics
  - Delco ignition system
- Sierra Leone Development Company

== Media ==
- Delco Proper, television show

== Linguistics ==
- Delco accent, a form of the Philadelphia or Delaware Valley accent, named for Delaware County.

== People with the surname ==
- Wilhelmina Ruth Delco (born 1929), American politician
