= American Comedy Awards =

Television and comedy film awards

- Awarded for: Outstanding comedy in film, television and stage
- Country: United States
- Presented by: ABC (1987–97); Fox (1998–2000); Comedy Central (2001); NBC (2014)
- First award: 1987
- Final award: 2014

The American Comedy Awards were a group of awards presented annually in the United States recognizing performances and performers in the field of comedy, with an emphasis on television comedy and comedy films. They were first presented in May 1987, billed as the "first awards show to honor all forms of comedy." In 1989, after the death of Lucille Ball, the statue was named "the Lucy" to honor her.

The awards ceased after 2001. NBC revived the awards for a single year in May 2014.

== History ==
George Schlatter created and produced the American Comedy Awards that first aired on ABC on May 20, 1987, later moving to FOX and finally Comedy Central. Previously, ABC had broadcast a similar awards program for two years in the 1970s; it was called the "American Academy of Humor" and was "founded" by Alan King.

The last ACA ceremony in 2001 was aired and produced by the cable network Comedy Central; in 2003 that network tried to replicate the awards with its own Commie Awards in what turned out to be a one-time replacement. In 2011 Comedy Central created a new annual awards show, The Comedy Awards, which first aired on April 10, 2011.

== 1987 awards ==
Category	Winner	Work	Nominees
Funniest Actor in a Motion Picture (Leading Role) (Presented by Whoopi Goldberg and Lily Tomlin)	Woody Allen	Hannah and Her Sisters	Rodney Dangerfield – Back to School; Tom Hanks – Nothing in Common; Danny DeVito – Ruthless People; Steve Martin – Little Shop of Horrors
Funniest Actress in a Motion Picture (Leading Role) (Presented by Walter Matthau)	Bette Midler	Ruthless People	Ellen Greene – Little Shop of Horrors; Meryl Streep – Heartburn; Dianne Wiest – Hannah and Her Sisters; Goldie Hawn – Wildcats; Whoopi Goldberg – Jumpin' Jack Flash
Funniest Newcomer – Male or Female (Presented by George Carlin)	Woody Harrelson	Cheers	Alf - ALF Mark Linn-Baker - Perfect Strangers Roseanne Barr - The Tonight Show Starring Johnny Carson Sam Kinison - Rodney Dangerfield's Young Comedians
Funniest Female Stand-Up Comic (Presented by Carl Reiner)	Lily Tomlin		Elayne Boosler Whoopi Goldberg Bette Midler Joan Rivers
Funniest Female Performer of the Year (Presented by Julia Duffy and Peter Scolari)	Bette Midler		Carol Burnett Whoopi Goldberg Lily Tomlin Betty White
Funniest Male Stand-Up Comic (Presented by Whoopi Goldberg)	Robin Williams		Billy Crystal Jay Leno Eddie Murphy Richard Pryor
Funniest Male Performer of the Year (Presented by Bea Arthur, Betty White, Rue McClanahan and Estelle Getty)	Robin Williams		Johnny Carson Steve Martin George Carlin Bronson Pinchot
Funniest Male Performer in a TV Series (Leading Role) – Network, Cable or Syndication (Presented by Roseanne Barr and Louie Anderson)	Johnny Carson	The Tonight Show	Ted Danson - Cheers Michael J. Fox - Family Ties Pee-wee Herman - Pee-wee's Playhouse David Letterman - Late Night with David Letterman
Funniest Female Performer in a TV Series (Leading Role) – Network, Cable or Syndication (Presented by Shirley MacLaine)	Betty White	The Golden Girls	Julia Duffy – Newhart; Bea Arthur – The Golden Girls; Shelley Long – Cheers; Estelle Getty – The Golden Girls
Funniest Television Star in a Special – Male or Female (Presented by Mark Linn-Baker and Bronson Pinchot in their roles of Larry Appleton and Balki Bartokomous on Perfect Strangers)	Robin Williams	Robin Williams: An Evening at the Met	Billy Crystal – On Location; Garry Shandling – The Garry Shandling Show: 25th Anniversary Special; Carol Burnett – Fresno; George Carlin – On Location
Funniest Record And/Or Video - Male, Female or Group (Presented by Pee-wee Herman and Carol Channing)	Bette Midler	Mud Will Be Flung Tonight	Dan Aykroyd - Saturday Night Live: The Best Of Dan Aykroyd George Carlin - Playin´ With Your Head Whoopi Goldberg - Jumpin' Jack Flash Steve Martin - Little Shop of Horrors

Creative Achievement Award

- Norman Lear (Presented by Bea Arthur)

Lifetime Achievement Award

Presented for Woman by Walter Matthau, and for Man by Betty White

- Steve Allen
- Woody Allen
- Lucille Ball
- Mel Brooks
- Carol Burnett
- George Burns
- Sid Caesar
- Bette Midler
- Mary Tyler Moore
- Lily Tomlin
- Jonathan Winters

Special Appearance

- Lily Tomlin
- Ed Begley Jr.
- Shirley MacLaine
- Whoopi Goldberg
- Ellen Greene
- George Carlin
- Betty White
- Ed McMahon
- Steven Wright
- Mark Russell

== 1988 awards ==
Category	Winner	Work	Nominees
Funniest Actor in a Motion Picture (Leading Role)	Robin Williams	Good Morning, Vietnam	John Candy – Planes, Trains & Automobiles; Steve Martin – Roxanne; Danny DeVito – Throw Momma from the Train; Nicolas Cage – Raising Arizona
Funniest Actress in a Motion Picture (Leading Role)	Bette Midler	Outrageous Fortune	Diane Keaton – Baby Boom; Holly Hunter – Broadcast News; Cher – Moonstruck; Goldie Hawn – Overboard
Funniest Female Stand-Up Comic	Lily Tomlin		
Funniest Female Performer of the Year	Tracey Ullman		
Funniest Male Stand-Up Comic	Robin Williams		
Comedy Club Stand-Up Comic – Female	Judy Tenuta		
Funniest Male Performer of the Year	Robin Williams		
Comedy Club Stand-Up Comic – Male	Jerry Seinfeld		
Funniest Supporting Male Performer – Motion Picture or TV	Albert Brooks	Broadcast News	Billy Crystal – The Princess Bride; Vincent Gardenia – Moonstruck
Funniest Female Performer in a TV Special – Network, Cable or Syndication	Roseanne Barr	On Location: The Roseanne Barr Show	
Funniest Male Performer in a TV Special – Network, Cable or Syndication	Robin Williams	Comic Relief '87	
Funniest Supporting Female Performer – Motion Picture or TV	Olympia Dukakis	Moonstruck	Carol Kane – The Princess Bride
Funniest Male Performer in a TV Series (Leading Role) – Network, Cable or Syndication	Garry Shandling	It's Garry Shandling's Show	
Funniest Female Performer in a TV Series (Leading Role) – Network, Cable or Syndication	Tracey Ullman	The Tracey Ullman Show	

Creative Achievement Award

- Blake Edwards

Lifetime Achievement Award

- George Burns
- Imogene Coca

== 1989 awards ==
Category	Winner	Work	Nominees
Funniest Actor in a Motion Picture (Leading Role)	Tom Hanks	Big	Kevin Kline – A Fish Called Wanda; Robert De Niro – Midnight Run; John Cleese – A Fish Called Wanda; Leslie Nielsen – The Naked Gun: From the Files of Police Squad!
Funniest Actress in a Motion Picture (Leading Role)	Bette Midler	Big Business	Lily Tomlin – Big Business; Susan Sarandon – Bull Durham; Jamie Lee Curtis – A Fish Called Wanda; Melanie Griffith – Working Girl
Funniest Supporting Actor in a Motion Picture	Arsenio Hall	Coming to America	
Funniest Supporting Actress in a Motion Picture	Joan Cusack	Working Girl	
Funniest Female Stand-Up Comic	Roseanne Barr		
Funniest Male Stand-Up Comic	Robin Williams		
Comedy Club Stand-Up Comic – Female	Paula Poundstone		
Comedy Club Stand-Up Comic – Male	Bobby Slayton		
Funniest Female Performer in a TV Special – Network, Cable or Syndication	Tracey Ullman	Tracey Ullman: Backstage	
Funniest Supporting Male Performer in a TV Series	Dana Carvey	Saturday Night Live	
Funniest Male Performer in a TV Special – Network, Cable or Syndication	David Letterman	Late Show with David Letterman: 6th Anniversary Special	
Funniest Supporting Female Performer in a TV Series	Rhea Perlman	Cheers	
Funniest Male Performer in a TV Series (Leading Role) – Network, Cable or Syndication	John Goodman	Roseanne	Ted Danson – Cheers
Funniest Female Performer in a TV Series (Leading Role) – Network, Cable or Syndication	Roseanne Barr	Roseanne	Candice Bergen – Murphy Brown; Kirstie Alley – Cheers

Creative Achievement Award

- Neil Simon

Lifetime Achievement Award

- Katharine Hepburn
- Red Skelton

== 1990 awards ==
Category	Winner	Work	Nominees
Funniest Actor in a Motion Picture (Leading Role)	Billy Crystal	When Harry Met Sally...	Woody Allen – Crimes and Misdemeanors; Morgan Freeman – Driving Miss Daisy; Steve Martin – Parenthood; Jack Nicholson – Batman
Funniest Actress in a Motion Picture (Leading Role)	Meg Ryan	When Harry Met Sally...	Kirstie Alley – Look Who's Talking; Bette Midler – Beaches; Michelle Pfeiffer – The Fabulous Baker Boys; Jessica Tandy – Driving Miss Daisy
Funniest Supporting Actor in a Motion Picture	Rick Moranis	Parenthood	Dan Aykroyd – Driving Miss Daisy; Beau Bridges – The Fabulous Baker Boys; Ted Danson – Dad; Robin Williams – The Adventures of Baron Munchausen
Funniest Supporting Actress in a Motion Picture	Julie Kavner	New York Stories	Olympia Dukakis – Steel Magnolias; Carrie Fisher – When Harry Met Sally... Shirley MacLaine – Steel Magnolias; Dianne Wiest – Parenthood
Funniest Female Stand-Up Comic	Rita Rudner		
Funniest Male Stand-Up Comic	Jeff Foxworthy		
Funniest Female Performer in a TV Special – Network, Cable or Syndication	Carol Burnett	Julie & Carol: Together Again	Jane Curtin – Saturday Night Live: 15th Anniversary; Whoopi Goldberg – Comic Relief III; Andrea Martin – Andrea Martin... Together Again
Funniest Supporting Male Performer in a TV Series	Dana Carvey	Saturday Night Live	Woody Harrelson – Cheers; John Larroquette – Night Court; Alex Rocco – The Famous Teddy Z Peter Scolari – Newhart
Funniest Male Performer in a TV Special – Network, Cable or Syndication	Robin Williams	Comic Relief III	Billy Crystal – Billy Crystal: Midnight Train to Moscow; Jay Leno – The Tonight Show Starring Johnny Carson: 27th Anniversary Show
Funniest Supporting Female Performer in a TV Series	Julie Kavner	The Tracey Ullman Show	Julia Duffy – Newhart; Faith Ford – Murphy Brown; Jan Hooks – Saturday Night Live; Rhea Perlman – Cheers
Funniest Male Performer in a TV Series (Leading Role) – Network, Cable or Syndication	John Goodman	Roseanne	Ted Danson – Cheers; Arsenio Hall – The Arsenio Hall Show; Bob Newhart – Newhart
Funniest Female Performer in a TV Series (Leading Role) Network, Cable or Syndication	Tracey Ullman	The Tracey Ullman Show	Kirstie Alley – Cheers; Roseanne Barr – Roseanne; Candice Bergen – Murphy Brown; Betty White – The Golden Girls

Creative Achievement Award

- Garry Marshall

Lifetime Achievement Award

- Art Carney
- Betty White

== 1991 awards ==
Category	Winner	Work	Nominees
Funniest Actor in a Motion Picture (Leading Role)	Macaulay Culkin	Home Alone	Gerard Depardieu – Green Card; Johnny Depp – Edward Scissorhands; Marlon Brando – The Freshman; Robin Williams – Cadillac Man
Funniest Actress in a Motion Picture (Leading Role)	Meryl Streep	Postcards From The Edge	Mia Farrow – Alice; Andie MacDowell – Green Card; Julia Roberts – Pretty Woman; Tracey Ullman – I Love You To Death
Funniest Supporting Actor in a Motion Picture	Al Pacino	Dick Tracy	Alan Arkin – Edward Scissorhands; Hector Elizondo – Pretty Woman; Dustin Hoffman – Dick Tracy; Joe Pesci – Home Alone
Funniest Supporting Actress in a Motion Picture	Whoopi Goldberg	Ghost	Julie Kavner – Alice; Shirley MacLaine – Postcards From The Edge; Laura San Giacomo – Pretty Woman; Dianne Wiest – Edward Scissorhands
Funniest Female Stand-Up Comic	Ellen DeGeneres		Diane Ford; Cathy Ladman; Carol Leifer; Pam Stone
Funniest Male Stand-Up Comic	Dennis Wolfberg		Tim Allen; Will Durst; Bill Hicks; Richard Jeni
Funniest Female Performer in a TV Special – Network, Cable or Syndication	Lily Tomlin	An Evening With... Friends of the Environment	Meryl Streep – An Evening with...
Funniest Supporting Male Performer in a TV Series	Dana Carvey	Saturday Night Live	
Funniest Male Performer in a TV Special – Network, Cable or Syndication	Jonathan Winters	Jonathan Winters and His Traveling Road Show	
Funniest Supporting Female Performer in a TV Series	Estelle Getty	The Golden Girls	
Funniest Male Performer in a TV Series (Leading Role) – Network, Cable or Syndication	Ted Danson	Cheers	John Goodman – Roseanne
Funniest Female Performer in a TV Series (Leading Role) – Network, Cable or Syndication	Tracey Ullman	The Tracey Ullman Show	Candice Bergen – Murphy Brown; Kirstie Alley – Cheers; Roseanne Barr – Roseanne

Creative Achievement Award

- Carl Reiner

Lifetime Achievement Award

- Doris Day
- Jack Lemmon

== 1992 awards ==
Category	Winner	Work	Nominees
Funniest Actor in a Motion Picture (Leading Role)	Billy Crystal	City Slickers	Albert Brooks – Defending Your Life; Kevin Kline – Soapdish; Steve Martin – L.A. Story; Robin Williams – The Fisher King
Funniest Actress in a Motion Picture (Leading Role)	Lily Tomlin	The Search for Signs of Intelligent Life in the Universe	Geena Davis – Thelma & Louise; Sally Field – Soapdish; Whoopi Goldberg – Soapdish; Susan Sarandon – Thelma & Louise
Funniest Supporting Actor in a Motion Picture	Jack Palance	City Slickers	Daniel Stern – City Slickers; Bruno Kirby – City Slickers
Funniest Supporting Actress in a Motion Picture	Mercedes Ruehl	The Fisher King	Cathy Moriarty – Soapdish; Jessica Tandy – Fried Green Tomatoes
Funniest Female Stand-Up Comic	Cathy Ladman		
Funniest Male Stand-Up Comic	Bill Engvall		
Funniest Female Performer in a TV Special – Network, Cable or Syndication	Tracey Ullman	Funny Women of Television	
Funniest Supporting Male Performer in a TV Series	Jason Alexander	Seinfeld	
Funniest Male Performer in a TV Special – Network, Cable or Syndication	Billy Crystal	The 63rd Annual Academy Awards	
Funniest Supporting Female Performer in a TV Series	Estelle Getty	The Golden Girls	
Funniest Male Performer in a TV Series (Leading Role) – Network, Cable or Syndication	Jerry Seinfeld	Seinfeld	John Goodman – Roseanne
Funniest Female Performer in a TV Series (Leading Role) – Network, Cable or Syndication	Candice Bergen	Murphy Brown	Roseanne Barr – Roseanne

Creative Achievement Award

- Penny Marshall

Lifetime Achievement Award

- Johnny Carson
- Phyllis Diller

== 1993 awards ==
Category	Winner	Work	Nominees
Funniest Actor in a Motion Picture (Leading Role)	Joe Pesci	My Cousin Vinny	Mike Myers – Wayne's World; Billy Crystal – Mr. Saturday Night; Dana Carvey – Wayne's World; Nicolas Cage – Honeymoon in Vegas; Bruce Willis – Death Becomes Her
Funniest Actress in a Motion Picture (Leading Role)	Whoopi Goldberg	Sister Act	Marisa Tomei – My Cousin Vinny; Rita Rudner – Peter's Friends; Goldie Hawn – Housesitter; Meryl Streep – Death Becomes Her
Funniest Supporting Actor in a Motion Picture	Tom Hanks	A League of Their Own	Joe Pesci – Home Alone 2: Lost In New York; Tim Curry – Passed Away; Fred Gwynne – My Cousin Vinny; Jon Lovitz – A League of Their Own
Funniest Supporting Actress in a Motion Picture	Kathy Najimy	Sister Act	Maggie Smith – Sister Act; Rosie O'Donnell – A League of Their Own; Judy Davis – Husbands and Wives; Mary Wickes – Sister Act; Whoopi Goldberg – The Player
Funniest Female Stand-Up Comic	Pam Stone		Diane Ford; Kathleen Madigan; Monica Piper; Margaret Smith
Funniest Male Stand-Up Comic	Richard Jeni		Will Durst; Bill Hicks; Ritch Shydner; George Wallace
Funniest Female Performer in a TV Special – Network, Cable or Syndication	Bette Midler	The Tonight Show Starring Johnny Carson: 2nd to Last Tonight Show	Elayne Boosler – Elayne Boosler's Midnight Hour; Whoopi Goldberg – Comic Relief V Paula Poundstone – The Paula Poundstone Show; Lily Tomlin – The Montreal Just for Laughs Show
Funniest Supporting Male Performer in a TV Series	Jason Alexander	Seinfeld	Jim Carrey – In Living Color; Dana Carvey – Saturday Night Live; Phil Hartman – Saturday Night Live; Jerry Van Dyke – Coach
Funniest Male Performer in a TV Special – Network, Cable or Syndication	Billy Crystal	The 64th Annual Academy Awards	George Carlin – Jammin' in New York; Dana Carvey – The 15th Annual Young Comedians Special; David Letterman – Late Night with David Letterman: The Annual Anniversary Special; Robin Williams – Comic Relief V
Funniest Supporting Female Performer in a TV Series	Julia Louis-Dreyfus	Seinfeld	Elizabeth Ashley – Evening Shade; Faith Ford – Murphy Brown; John Goodman – Roseanne; Laurie Metcalf – Roseanne
Funniest Male Performer in a TV Series (Leading Role) – Network, Cable or Syndication	Jerry Seinfeld	Seinfeld	Tim Allen – Home Improvement; Johnny Carson – The Tonight Show Starring Johnny Carson; John Goodman – Roseanne; Garry Shandling – The Larry Sanders Show
Funniest Female Performer in a TV Series (Leading Role) – Network, Cable or Syndication	Roseanne Barr	Roseanne	Kirstie Alley – Cheers; Candice Bergen – Murphy Brown; Helen Hunt – Mad About You; Katey Sagal – Married... with Children

Creative Achievement Award

- Billy Crystal

Lifetime Achievement Award

- Shirley MacLaine
- Richard Pryor

== 1994 awards ==
Category	Winner	Work	Nominees
Funniest Actor in a Motion Picture (Leading Role)	Robin Williams	Mrs. Doubtfire	Jack Lemmon – Grumpy Old Men; Tom Hanks – Sleepless in Seattle; Bill Murray – Groundhog Day; Kevin Kline – Dave
Funniest Actress in a Motion Picture (Leading Role)	Meg Ryan	Sleepless in Seattle	Emma Thompson – Much Ado About Nothing; Rosie O'Donnell – Another Stakeout; Anjelica Huston – Addams Family Values; Lily Tomlin – The Beverly Hillbillies
Funniest Supporting Actor in a Motion Picture	Charles Grodin	Dave	Christopher Lloyd – Addams Family Values; Michael Keaton – Much Ado About Nothing; Chris Elliott – Groundhog Day; Harvey Fierstein – Mrs. Doubtfire; Pierce Brosnan – Mrs. Doubtfire
Funniest Supporting Actress in a Motion Picture	Lily Tomlin	Short Cuts	Joan Cusack – Addams Family Values; Rosie O'Donnell – Sleepless in Seattle; Carol Kane – Addams Family Values; Kathy Najimy – Sister Act 2: Back in the Habit
Funniest Female Stand-Up Comic	Margaret Cho		Diane Ford; Stephanie Hodge; Kathleen Madigan; Margaret Smith
Funniest Male Stand-Up Comic	Carrot Top		Will Durst; Bill Hicks; Dom Irrera; George Wallace
Funniest Female Performer in a TV Special – Network, Cable or Syndication	Tracey Ullman	Tracey Takes on New York	Carol Burnett – The Carol Burnett Show: A Reunion; Whoopi Goldberg – A Gala for the President at Ford's Theatre; Rosie O'Donnell – Standup Spotlight; Paula Poundstone – The 45th Annual Primetime Emmy Awards
Funniest Supporting Male Performer in a TV Series	Rip Torn	The Larry Sanders Show	Jason Alexander – Seinfeld; Phil Hartman – Saturday Night Live; Michael Richards – Seinfeld; Jerry Van Dyke – Coach
Funniest Male Performer in a TV Special – Network, Cable or Syndication	Billy Crystal	The 65th Annual Academy Awards	Jason Alexander – Comedy Hall of Fame; George Carlin – Live at the Paramount; Dennis Miller – They Shoot HBO Specials, Don't They? Robin Williams – Comedy Store's 25th Anniversary
Funniest Supporting Female Performer in a TV Series	Julia Louis-Dreyfus	Seinfeld	Sandra Bernhard – Roseanne; Faith Ford – Murphy Brown; Sara Gilbert – Roseanne; Laurie Metcalf – Roseanne
Funniest Male Performer in a TV Series (Leading Role) – Network, Cable or Syndication	David Letterman	Late Show with David Letterman	Tim Allen – Home Improvement; John Goodman – Roseanne; Kelsey Grammer – Frasier; Jerry Seinfeld – Seinfeld
Funniest Female Performer in a TV Series (Leading Role) – Network, Cable or Syndication	Helen Hunt	Mad About You	Kirstie Alley – Cheers; Roseanne Barr – Roseanne; Candice Bergen – Murphy Brown; Brett Butler – Grace Under Fire

Creative Achievement Award

- Mike Nichols

Lifetime Achievement Award

- Dick Van Dyke
- Elaine May

== 1995 awards ==
Category	Winner	Work	Nominees
Funniest Actor in a Motion Picture (Leading Role)	Tom Hanks	Forrest Gump	Jim Carrey – Ace Ventura: Pet Detective; Tim Allen – The Santa Clause; Hugh Grant – Four Weddings and a Funeral; John Travolta – Pulp Fiction
Funniest Actress in a Motion Picture (Leading Role)	Jamie Lee Curtis	True Lies	Jodie Foster – Maverick; Shirley MacLaine – Guarding Tess; Whoopi Goldberg – Corrina, Corrina; Emma Thompson – Junior; Madeline Kahn – Mixed Nuts; Uma Thurman – Pulp Fiction
Funniest Supporting Actor in a Motion Picture	Martin Landau	Ed Wood	Harvey Keitel – Pulp Fiction; Tom Arnold – True Lies; Chazz Palminteri – Bullets Over Broadway; Rowan Atkinson – Four Weddings and a Funeral
Funniest Supporting Actress in a Motion Picture	Dianne Wiest	Bullets Over Broadway	Jennifer Tilly – Bullets Over Broadway; Tracey Ullman – Bullets Over Broadway; Amanda Plummer – Pulp Fiction; Sally Field – Forrest Gump
Funniest Female Stand-Up Comic	Margaret Smith		Kathleen Madigan; Wendy Liebman; Diane Ford; Kathy Buckley
Funniest Male Stand-Up Comic	George Wallace		Will Durst; Dom Irrera; Jake Johannsen; Brian Regan
Funniest Female Performer in a TV Special – Network, Cable or Syndication	Ellen DeGeneres	The 46th Annual Primetime Emmy Awards	Roseanne Barr – 1994 MTV Video Music Awards; Brett Butler – Brett Butler: Sold Out; Whoopi Goldberg – The 66th Annual Academy Awards; Lily Tomlin – Growing Up Funny
Funniest Supporting Male Performer in a TV Series	David Hyde Pierce	Frasier	Jason Alexander – Seinfeld; Michael Richards – Seinfeld; Jeffrey Tambor – The Larry Sanders Show; Rip Torn – The Larry Sanders Show
Funniest Male Performer in a TV Special – Network, Cable or Syndication	David Letterman	Late Show with David Letterman: Video Special	Jason Alexander – Comic Relief VI; Billy Crystal & Robin Williams – Comic Relief VI; Phil Hartman – Saturday Night Live Primetime Special; Garry Shandling – The 36th Annual Grammy Awards
Funniest Supporting Female Performer in a TV Series	Julia Louis-Dreyfus	Seinfeld	Faith Ford – Murphy Brown; Sara Gilbert – Roseanne; Laurie Metcalf – Roseanne; Liz Torres – The John Larroquette Show
Funniest Male Performer in a TV Series (Leading Role) – Network, Cable or Syndication	Kelsey Grammer	Frasier	Tim Allen – Home Improvement; John Goodman – Roseanne; David Letterman – Late Show with David Letterman; Jerry Seinfeld – Seinfeld
Funniest Female Performer in a TV Series (Leading Role) – Network, Cable or Syndication	Helen Hunt	Mad About You	Roseanne Barr – Roseanne; Candice Bergen – Murphy Brown; Brett Butler – Grace Under Fire; Ellen DeGeneres – Ellen

Creative Achievement Award

- Rodney Dangerfield

Lifetime Achievement Award

- Bob Hope
- Audrey Meadows

== 1996 awards ==
Category	Winner	Work	Nominees
Funniest Actor in a Motion Picture (Leading Role)	John Travolta	Get Shorty	Jim Carrey – Ace Ventura: When Nature Calls; Gene Hackman – Get Shorty; Kevin Kline – French Kiss; Jack Lemmon – Grumpier Old Men; Steve Martin – Father of the Bride Part II
Funniest Actress in a Motion Picture (Leading Role)	Alicia Silverstone	Clueless	Annette Bening – The American President; Sandra Bullock – While You Were Sleeping; Nicole Kidman – To Die For; Meg Ryan – French Kiss
Funniest Supporting Actor in a Motion Picture	Dennis Farina	Get Shorty	Michael J. Fox – The American President; Nathan Lane – Jeffrey; Michael Richards – Unstrung Heroes; Robin Williams – Nine Months
Funniest Supporting Actress in a Motion Picture	Bette Midler	Get Shorty	Joan Cusack – Nine Months; Janeane Garofalo – Bye Bye Love; Kyra Sedgwick – Something to Talk About; Lily Tomlin – Blue in the Face
Funniest Female Stand-Up Comic	Kathleen Madigan		
Funniest Male Stand-Up Comic	Brian Regan		
Funniest Female Performer in a TV Special – Network, Cable or Syndication	Tracey Ullman	Women of the Night IV	
Funniest Supporting Male Performer in a TV Series	David Hyde Pierce	Frasier	Jason Alexander – Seinfeld; Matthew Perry – Friends; Michael Richards – Seinfeld; David Schwimmer – Friends
Funniest Male Performer in a TV Special – Network, Cable or Syndication	Dennis Miller	Dennis Miller: State of the Union Undressed	
Funniest Supporting Female Performer in a TV Series	Christine Baranski	Cybill	Jennifer Aniston – Friends; Faith Ford – Murphy Brown; Janeane Garofalo – The Larry Sanders Show; Lisa Kudrow – Friends; Julia Louis-Dreyfus – Seinfeld; Liz Torres – The John Larroquette Show
Funniest Male Performer in a TV Series (Leading Role) – Network, Cable or Syndication	Kelsey Grammer	Frasier	David Letterman – Late Show with David Letterman; Paul Reiser – Mad About You; Jerry Seinfeld – Seinfeld; Garry Shandling – The Larry Sanders Show
Funniest Female Performer in a TV Series (Leading Role) – Network, Cable or Syndication	Helen Hunt	Mad About You	Roseanne Barr – Roseanne; Candice Bergen – Murphy Brown; Ellen DeGeneres – Ellen; Fran Drescher – The Nanny

Creative Achievement Award

- James Burrows

Lifetime Achievement Award

- Anne Bancroft
- Milton Berle

== 1997 awards ==
Category	Winner	Work	Nominees
Funniest Actor in a Motion Picture (Leading Role)	Nathan Lane	The Birdcage	Eddie Murphy – The Nutty Professor; Albert Brooks – Mother; Steve Buscemi – Fargo
Funniest Actress in a Motion Picture (Leading Role)	Frances McDormand	Fargo	Diane Keaton – The First Wives Club; Janeane Garofalo – The Truth About Cats & Dogs; Bette Midler – The First Wives Club; Goldie Hawn – The First Wives Club
Funniest Supporting Actor in a Motion Picture	Cuba Gooding Jr.	Jerry Maguire	Hank Azaria – The Birdcage; Tom Hanks – That Thing You Do! Cheech Marin – Tin Cup; Tim Conway – Dear God; William H. Macy – Fargo
Funniest Supporting Actress in a Motion Picture	Dianne Wiest	The Birdcage	Lauren Bacall – The Mirror Has Two Faces; Mary Tyler Moore – Flirting with Disaster; Christine Baranski – The Birdcage; Lily Tomlin – Flirting with Disaster
Funniest Female Stand-Up Comic (Presented by Roseanne Barr and Lily Tomlin)	Wendy Liebman		Kathy Buckley Diane Ford Maryellen Hooper Sheila Kay
Funniest Male Stand-Up Comic (Presented by Roseanne Barr and Lily Tomlin)	Craig Shoemaker		Dave Attell Will Durst Dom Irrera Bob Zany
Funniest Female Performer in a TV Special – Network, Cable or Syndication (Presented by Kelsey Grammer)	Kathy Bates	The Late Shift	Ellen DeGeneres - 38th Annual Grammy Awards Rosie O'Donnell - To Catch A Rising Star's 50th Anniversary Lily Tomlin - 10th American Comedy Awards
Funniest Supporting Male Performer in a TV Series (Presented by Brooke Shields)	David Hyde Pierce	Frasier	Jason Alexander - Seinfeld Michael Richards - Seinfeld Jeffrey Tambor - The Larry Sanders Show Rip Torn - The Larry Sanders Show
Funniest Male Performer in a TV Special – Network, Cable or Syndication (Presented by Jamie Foxx)	George Carlin	George Carlin Back in Town	Nathan Lane - 50th Tony Awards David Letterman - Late Show with David Letterman Vídeo Special 2 Bill Maher - Politically Incorrect Convention Coverage Robin Williams - Comic Relief 10th Anniversary
Funniest Supporting Female Performer in a TV Series (Presented by Chevy Chase and Jane Curtin)	Julia Louis-Dreyfus	Seinfeld	Kristen Johnston – 3rd Rock from the Sun Christine Baranski - Cybill Lisa Kudrow - Friends
Funniest Male Performer in a TV Series (Leading Role) – Network, Cable or Syndication (Presented by Eric Idle)	John Lithgow	3rd Rock from the Sun	Tim Allen - Home Improvement (TV series) Drew Carey - The Drew Carey Show Kelsey Grammer - Frasier Garry Shandling - The Larry Sanders Show
Funniest Female Guest Appearance in a TV Series (Presented by Jonathan Lipnicki and Mae Whitman)	Carol Burnett	Mad About You	Ellen DeGeneres - The Larry Sanders Show Janeane Garofalo - Seinfeld Brooke Shields - Friends Betty White - Suddenly Susan
Funniest Female Performer in a TV Series (Leading Role) – Network, Cable or Syndication (Presented by Bill Maher)	Rosie O'Donnell	The Rosie O'Donnell Show	Jane Curtin - 3rd Rock from the Sun Ellen DeGeneres - Ellen Fran Drescher - The Nanny Helen Hunt - Mad About You Tracey Ullman - Tracey Takes On...
Funniest Male Guest Appearance in a TV Series (Presented by Paul Reiser)	Mel Brooks	Mad About You	Jason Alexander - The Nanny Jim Carrey - Saturday Night Live David Duchovny - The Larry Sanders Show Nathan Lane - Frasier

Creative Achievement Award

- Rob Reiner (Presented by Kathy Bates)

Lifetime Achievement Award

- Walter Matthau
- Debbie Reynolds (Presented by Carrie Fisher)

Special Appearances

- David Alan Grier
- Phil Hartman
- Kathy Griffin
- Kevin Meaney
- Jonathan Winters
- Sid Caesar

== 1998 awards ==
Category	Winner	Work	Nominees
Funniest Actor in a Motion Picture (Leading Role)	Jack Nicholson	As Good as It Gets	Jim Carrey – Liar Liar; Christopher Guest – Waiting for Guffman; Kevin Kline – In & Out; Mike Myers – Austin Powers: International Man of Mystery
Funniest Actress in a Motion Picture (Leading Role)	Helen Hunt	As Good as It Gets	Minnie Driver – Grosse Pointe Blank; Lisa Kudrow – Romy and Michele's High School Reunion; Bette Midler – That Old Feeling; Julia Roberts – My Best Friend's Wedding
Funniest Supporting Actor in a Motion Picture	Rupert Everett	My Best Friend's Wedding	
Funniest Supporting Actress in a Motion Picture	Joan Cusack	In & Out	
Funniest Female Stand-Up Comic	Maryellen Hooper		
Funniest Male Stand-Up Comic	Jeff Dunham		
Funniest Female Performer in a TV Special – Network, Cable or Syndication	Bette Midler	Bette Midler in Concert: Diva Las Vegas	Ellen DeGeneres – The 39th Annual Grammy Awards; Janeane Garofalo – The HBO Comedy Hour; Rosie O'Donnell – The 51st Annual Tony Awards; Lily Tomlin – The American Comedy Honors
Funniest Supporting Male Performer in a TV Series	David Hyde Pierce	Frasier	
Funniest Male Performer in a TV Special – Network, Cable or Syndication	George Carlin	George Carlin: 40 Years of Comedy	
Funniest Supporting Female Performer in a TV Series	Julia Louis-Dreyfus	Seinfeld	Christine Baranski – Cybill; Kristen Johnston – 3rd Rock from the Sun; Kathy Najimy – Veronica's Closet; Lily Tomlin – Murphy Brown
Funniest Male Performer in a TV Series (Leading Role) – Network, Cable or Syndication	Garry Shandling	The Larry Sanders Show	Michael J. Fox – Spin City; Kelsey Grammer – Frasier; John Lithgow – 3rd Rock from the Sun; Paul Reiser – Mad About You; Jerry Seinfeld – Seinfeld
Funniest Female Guest Appearance in a TV Series	Carol Burnett	Mad About You	
Funniest Female Performer in a TV Series (Leading Role) – Network, Cable or Syndication	Tracey Ullman	Tracey Takes On...	Helen Hunt – Mad About You; Kirstie Alley – Veronica's Closet; Ellen DeGeneres – Ellen; Rosie O'Donnell – The Rosie O'Donnell Show
Funniest Male Guest Appearance in a TV Series	Jerry Stiller	Seinfeld	

Creative Achievement Award

- Frank Oz

Lifetime Achievement Award

- Jerry Lewis

== 1999 awards ==
Category	Winner	Work	Nominees
Funniest Actor in a Motion Picture (Leading Role)	Roberto Benigni	Life Is Beautiful	Jim Carrey – The Truman Show; Tom Hanks – You've Got Mail; Adam Sandler – The Wedding Singer; Ben Stiller – There's Something About Mary; Robin Williams – Patch Adams
Funniest Actress in a Motion Picture (Leading Role)	Cameron Diaz	There's Something About Mary	Drew Barrymore – The Wedding Singer; Holly Hunter – Living Out Loud; Christina Ricci – The Opposite of Sex; Meg Ryan – You've Got Mail; Emma Thompson – Primary Colors
Funniest Supporting Actor in a Motion Picture	Bill Murray	Rushmore	Ben Affleck – Shakespeare in Love; Chris Elliott – There's Something About Mary; William H. Macy – Pleasantville; Chris Rock – Lethal Weapon 4
Funniest Supporting Actress in a Motion Picture	Kathy Bates	Primary Colors	Whoopi Goldberg – How Stella Got Her Groove Back; Lisa Kudrow – The Opposite of Sex; Marisa Tomei – Slums of Beverly Hills; Dianne Wiest – Practical Magic
Funniest Female Stand-Up Comic	Etta May; Felicia Michaels		
Funniest Male Stand-Up Comic	John Pinette; Robert Schimmel		
Funniest Female Performer in a TV Special – Network, Cable or Syndication	Carol Burnett	The Marriage Fool	Rosie O'Donnell – 52nd Annual Tony Awards; Ellen DeGeneres – 1998 VH1 Fashion Awards; Janeane Garofalo – The Ms. Foundation's Women of Comedy; Whoopi Goldberg – Comic Relief VIII
Funniest Supporting Male Performer in a TV Series	David Hyde Pierce	Frasier	Jason Alexander – Seinfeld; Michael Richards – Seinfeld; David Spade – Just Shoot Me! Rip Torn – The Larry Sanders Show
Funniest Male Performer in a TV Special – Network, Cable or Syndication	Billy Crystal	The 70th Annual Academy Awards	David Letterman – Late Show with David Letterman: 5th Anniversary Special; Chris Rock – Comic Relief VIII; Jerry Seinfeld – Jerry Seinfeld: 'I'm Telling You for the Last Time; Robin Williams – Comic Relief VIII
Funniest Supporting Female Performer in a TV Series	Doris Roberts	Everybody Loves Raymond	Jennifer Aniston – Friends; Courteney Cox – Friends; Lisa Kudrow – Friends; Julia Louis-Dreyfus – Seinfeld
Funniest Male Performer in a TV Series (Leading Role) – Network, Cable or Syndication	Garry Shandling	The Larry Sanders Show	Michael J. Fox – Spin City; Kelsey Grammer – Frasier; Chris Rock – The Chris Rock Show; Ray Romano – Everybody Loves Raymond
Funniest Female Guest Appearance in a TV Series	Tracey Ullman	Ally McBeal	Carol Burnett – Mad About You; Ellen DeGeneres – The Larry Sanders Show; Lisa Kudrow – Mad About You; Bebe Neuwirth – Frasier
Funniest Female Performer in a TV Series (Leading Role) – Network, Cable or Syndication	Tracey Ullman	Tracey Takes On...	Ellen DeGeneres – Ellen; Jenna Elfman – Dharma & Greg; Calista Flockhart – Ally McBeal; Helen Hunt – Mad About You
Funniest Male Guest Appearance in a TV Series	David Duchovny	The Larry Sanders Show	Hank Azaria – Mad About You; Alec Baldwin – Saturday Night Live; Jim Carrey – The Larry Sanders Show; Steve Martin – Late Show with David Letterman

Creative Achievement Award

- Barry Levinson

== 2000 Awards ==
Category	Winner(s)	Work	Nominees
Funniest Actor in a Motion Picture (Leading Role)	Mike Myers	Austin Powers: The Spy Who Shagged Me	Jim Carrey – Man on the Moon; Robert De Niro – Analyze This; Kevin Spacey – American Beauty
Funniest Actress in a Motion Picture (Leading Role)	Annette Bening	American Beauty	Drew Barrymore – Never Been Kissed; Janeane Garofalo – Mystery Men; Reese Witherspoon – Election
Funniest Supporting Actor in a Motion Picture	John Malkovich	Being John Malkovich	Eugene Levy – American Pie; William H. Macy – Happy, Texas
Funniest Supporting Actress in a Motion Picture	Joan Cusack	Runaway Bride	Cameron Diaz – Being John Malkovich; Lisa Kudrow – Analyze This
Funniest Motion Picture	Analyze This		American Beauty; Being John Malkovich
Funniest Female Performer in a TV Special – Network, Cable or Syndication	Kathy Bates	Annie	Whoopi Goldberg – The 71st Annual Academy Awards; Lisa Kudrow – 1999 MTV Movie Awards
Funniest Supporting Male Performer in a TV Series	David Hyde Pierce	Frasier	Peter Boyle – Everybody Loves Raymond; Sean Hayes – Will & Grace
Funniest Male Performer in a TV Special – Network, Cable or Syndication	Chris Rock	Chris Rock: Bigger & Blacker	Billy Crystal – Saturday Night Live 25; Bill Murray – Saturday Night Live 25; David Hyde Pierce – The 51st Annual Primetime Emmy Awards
Funniest Supporting Female Performer in a TV Series	Lisa Kudrow	Friends	Megan Mullally – Will & Grace; Doris Roberts – Everybody Loves Raymond
Funniest Male Performer in a TV Series (Leading Role) – Network, Cable or Syndication	Ray Romano	Everybody Loves Raymond	Michael J. Fox – Spin City; Chris Rock – The Chris Rock Show
Funniest Female Guest Appearance in a TV Series	Betty White	Ally McBeal	Christine Baranski – Frasier; Bebe Neuwirth – Frasier; Tracey Ullman – Ally McBeal
Funniest Television Series	Frasier		Everybody Loves Raymond; Will & Grace
Funniest Female Performer in a TV Series (Leading Role) – Network, Cable or Syndication	Tracey Ullman	Tracey Takes On...	Debra Messing – Will & Grace; Sarah Jessica Parker – Sex and the City
Funniest Male Guest Appearance in a TV Series	Mel Brooks	Mad About You	Hank Azaria – Mad About You; Tim Conway – Mad About You

Lifetime Achievement Award

- Steve Martin

== 2001 awards ==
Category	Winner	Work	Nominees
Funniest Actor in a Motion Picture (Leading Role)	Ben Stiller	Meet the Parents	George Clooney – O Brother, Where Art Thou? John Cusack – High Fidelity; Robert De Niro – Meet the Parents
Funniest Actress in a Motion Picture (Leading Role)	Sandra Bullock	Miss Congeniality	Tracey Ullman – Small Time Crooks; Renée Zellweger – Nurse Betty
Funniest Supporting Actor in a Motion Picture	Fred Willard	Best in Show	Jack Black – High Fidelity; Christopher Guest – Best in Show
Funniest Supporting Actress in a Motion Picture	Catherine O'Hara	Best in Show	Kate Hudson – Almost Famous; Frances McDormand Almost Famous
Funniest Motion Picture	Best in Show		Almost Famous; Meet the Parents
Funniest Female Stand-Up Comic	Wanda Sykes		Judy Gold; Sue Murphy
Funniest Male Stand-Up Comic	Lewis Black		Dave Attell; Dom Irrera
Funniest Male Performer in a TV Special – Network, Cable or Syndication	Will Ferrell	Saturday Night Live: Presidential Bash 2000	Billy Crystal – The 72nd Annual Academy Awards; Garry Shandling – 52nd Annual Primetime Emmy Awards; Jon Stewart – Indecision 2000: Election Night – Choose and Lose
Funniest Female Performer in a TV Special – Network, Cable or Syndication	Ellen DeGeneres	Ellen DeGeneres: The Beginning	Judi Dench – The Last of the Blonde Bombshells; Sarah Jessica Parker – 2000 MTV Movie Awards
Funniest Supporting Male Performer in a TV Series	Sean Hayes	Will & Grace	Robert Downey Jr. – Ally McBeal; Will Ferrell – Saturday Night Live; David Hyde Pierce – Frasier
Funniest Supporting Female Performer in a TV Series	Megan Mullally	Will & Grace	Jennifer Aniston – Friends; Lisa Kudrow – Friends
Funniest Male Performer in a TV Series (Leading Role) – Network, Cable or Syndication	David Letterman	Late Show with David Letterman	Kelsey Grammer – Frasier; Ray Romano – Everybody Loves Raymond
Funniest Female Guest Appearance in a TV Series	Bea Arthur	Malcolm in the Middle	Julia Louis-Dreyfus – Curb Your Enthusiasm; Jean Smart – Frasier; Reese Witherspoon – Friends
Funniest Television Series	Everybody Loves Raymond		Sex and the City; Will & Grace
Funniest Television Series – Animated	The Simpsons		King of the Hill; South Park
Funniest Female Performer in a TV Series (Leading Role) – Network, Cable or Syndication	Jane Kaczmarek	Malcolm in the Middle	Debra Messing – Will & Grace; Sarah Jessica Parker – Sex and the City
Funniest Male Guest Appearance in a TV Series	Christopher Walken	Saturday Night Live	Dana Carvey – Saturday Night Live; Gregory Hines – Will & Grace; Bruce Willis – Friends

Lifetime Achievement Award

- George Carlin

== 2014 awards ==
Category	Winner	Work	Nominees
Funniest Motion Picture	This Is the End	—N/a	Anchorman 2: The Legend Continues; The Heat; Jackass Presents: Bad Grandpa; Nebraska
Comedy Actor – Film	Will Ferrell	Anchorman 2: The Legend Continues	Bruce Dern – Nebraska; Johnny Knoxville – Jackass Presents: Bad Grandpa; Simon Pegg – The World's End; Seth Rogen – This Is the End
Comedy Actress – Film	Melissa McCarthy	The Heat	Lake Bell – In a World... Sandra Bullock – The Heat; Julia Louis-Dreyfus – Enough Said; Kristen Wiig – The Secret Life Of Walter Mitty
Comedy Supporting Actor – Film	Louis C.K.	American Hustle	Steve Carell – Anchorman 2: The Legend Continues; Will Forte – Nebraska; Jonah Hill – This Is the End; Danny McBride – This Is the End
Comedy Supporting Actress – Film	Jennifer Lawrence	American Hustle	Scarlett Johansson – Her; June Squibb – Nebraska; Emma Watson – This Is the End; Kristen Wiig – Anchorman 2: The Legend Continues
Comedy Director – Film	Evan Goldberg and Seth Rogen	This Is the End	Paul Feig – The Heat; Spike Jonze – Her; Alexander Payne – Nebraska; Edgar Wright – The World's End
Comedy Screenplay	Katie Dippold	The Heat	Spike Jonze – Her; Bob Nelson – Nebraska; Evan Goldberg and Seth Rogen – This Is the End; Edgar Wright and Simon Pegg – The World's End
Comedy Series	Parks and Recreation (NBC)	—N/a	Brooklyn Nine-Nine (Fox); Modern Family (ABC); Saturday Night Live (NBC); Veep (HBO)
Alternative Comedy Series	Key & Peele (Comedy Central)	—N/a	Archer (FX); Drunk History (Comedy Central); Kroll Show (Comedy Central); Portlandia (IFC)
Late Night Talk Show	The Colbert Report; The Daily Show with Jon Stewart (Comedy Central)	—N/a	Conan (TBS); Jimmy Kimmel Live! (ABC); Late Night with Jimmy Fallon (NBC)
Comedy Actor – TV	Andy Samberg	Brooklyn Nine-Nine (Fox)	Fred Armisen – Portlandia (IFC); Jason Bateman – Arrested Development (Netflix); Keegan-Michael Key – Key & Peele (Comedy Central); Jordan Peele – Key & Peele (Comedy Central)
Comedy Actress – TV	Amy Poehler	Parks and Recreation (NBC)	Zooey Deschanel – New Girl (Fox); Lena Dunham – Girls (HBO); Julia Louis-Dreyfus – Veep (HBO); Amy Schumer – Inside Amy Schumer (Comedy Central)
Comedy Supporting Actor – TV	Bill Hader	Saturday Night Live (NBC)	Aziz Ansari – Parks and Recreation (NBC); Will Arnett – Arrested Development (Netflix); Ty Burrell – Modern Family (ABC); Tony Hale – Veep (HBO)
Comedy Supporting Actress – TV	Kate McKinnon	Saturday Night Live (NBC)	Vanessa Bayer – Saturday Night Live (NBC); Julie Bowen – Modern Family (ABC); Allison Janney – Mom (CBS); Aubrey Plaza – Parks and Recreation (NBC)
Comedy Writing – TV	Modern Family (ABC)	—N/a	Arrested Development (Netflix); The Colbert Report (Comedy Central); Key & Peele (Comedy Central); Parks and Recreation (NBC)
Comedy Directing – TV	Peter Atencio	Key & Peele (Comedy Central)	Arrested Development (Netflix); Eastbound & Down (HBO); Modern Family (ABC); Parks and Recreation (NBC)
Comedy Special of the Year	Louis C.K.	Oh My God	Aziz Ansari: Buried Alive; Kristen Schaal – Live at the Fillmore; Mike Birbiglia – My Girlfriend’s Boyfriend; Patton Oswalt – Tragedy Plus Comedy Equals Time; Sarah Silverman – We Are Miracles
Best Club Comic	Maria Bamford	—N/a	Bill Burr; Jerrod Carmichael; Ron Funches; Kyle Kinane; Sebastian Maniscalco; Sean Patton; Brian Regan; Rory Scovel; Doug Stanhope

== Ratings ==
Viewership and ratings per American Comedy Awards broadcast
Year	Time slot	Air date	Network	Household rating		Viewers (millions)	Ref.
Year	Time slot	Air date	Network	Rating	Share	Viewers (millions)	Ref.
1987	Tuesday 9:00 p.m.	May 19	ABC	16.7	27	—N/a	
1988	Tuesday 9:00 p.m.	May 19	ABC	16.8	28	—N/a	
1989	Tuesday 9:00 p.m.	May 23	ABC	11.2	17	15.50	
1990	Monday 9:00 p.m.	March 19	ABC	14.1	23	20.90	
1991	Wednesday 9:00 p.m.	April 3	ABC	14.0	24	20.60	
1992	Wednesday 9:00 p.m.	May 20	ABC	11.6	20	15.80	
1993	Wednesday 9:00 p.m.	March 3	ABC	15.8	26	22.50	
1994	Monday 9:00 p.m.	May 23	ABC	11.9	18	16.50	
1995	Monday 9:00 p.m.	March 6	ABC	13.0	21	19.60	
1996	Wednesday 8:00 p.m.	March 6	ABC	11.8	18	16.40	
1997	Monday 9:00 p.m.	February 17	ABC	8.8	14	12.16	
1998	Tuesday 8:00 p.m.	March 17	Fox	4.8	8	6.46	
1999	Monday 8:00 p.m.	March 15	Fox	5.8	9	8.27	
2000	Thursday 8:00 p.m.	March 23	Fox	3.9	6	5.42	
2001	Wednesday 8:00 p.m.	April 25	Comedy Central	—N/a	—N/a	—N/a	
2014	Thursday 9:00 p.m.	May 8	NBC	—N/a	—N/a	3.15	

== See also ==
- Canadian Comedy Awards
- The Comedy Awards
- Mark Twain Prize for American Humor
- BBC Radio New Comedy Awards
- Robert Benchley Society Award for Humor
