= Delco Proper =

American TV series

- Genre: Sitcom
- Directed by: John McKeever
- Starring: Tommy Pope; John McKeever; Steve Gerben
- Country of origin: United States
- Original language: English
- No. of seasons: 1
- No. of episodes: 4

Production
- Executive producers: Tommy Pope; Eric Abrams; Samantha Saifer

Delco Proper is an American web comedy television series created by Tommy Pope and John McKeever, and featured on the Comedy Central website.

== Plot ==
The series centers around three best-friends who work at a lumber yard in Delaware County, Pennsylvania.

== Cast ==
- Tommy Pope as Tommy
- John McKeever as John
- Tim Butterly as Izzy
- Steve Gerben as Gordy
- Shannon DeVido as Shannon
- Shane Gillis

=== Season 1 (2015-2016) ===
No. overall	No. in season	Title	Directed by	Written by	Original release date
1	1	"The Funeral"	John McKeever	John McKeever, Tommy Pope	July 13, 2015
2	2	"A Family Business"	John McKeever	Shane Gillis, John McKeever, Tommy Pope	March 7, 2016
3	3	"Finding Spanksy"	John McKeever	John McKeever, Tommy Pope	March 7, 2016
4	4	"For The Troops"	John McKeever	John McKeever, Tommy Pope	March 7, 2016

== Production ==
Delco Proper was first aired on Comedy Central's website in 2015 for 4 episodes. Comedy Central then ordered a pilot for the series to air on its television network. The characters on the show were exaggerated versions of Pope and McKeever.
