= Steve Gerben =

American comedian (born 1983)

- Born: June 24, 1983 (age 43); Pennsylvania, U.S.
- Notable work: Delco Proper, Tires, Grool

Comedy career
- Medium: Stand-up, Acting,
- Genre: Sketch comedy

Steve Gerben (born June 24, 1983) is an American stand-up comedian, producer, writer, and actor. He is known for being one of the main producers, writers and actors in Tires, as well as his role in Delco Proper.

== Early life ==
Steve Gerben was born on June 24, 1983, to a Jewish family and grew up in the Tredyffrin/Easttown (T/E) area in Pennsylvania, near Berwyn. He attended George Washington University, but failed out of college and then went to Delaware County Community College, but did not graduate.

== Career ==
Gerben started out his comedy career as a stand-up comedian, but his career in that field never took off. While working in stand-up, he became friends with Shane Gillis, whom he has worked with throughout his career.

Gerben is best known for creating and starring in Tires on Netflix with Shane Gillis, where he plays the manager of his father's Valley Forge auto-repair shop. The show is semi-based around Gerben's personal life, as his real-life father owned an auto-repair shop. The show was originally supposed to be on YouTube, but was bought by Quibi until that platform went under, and the TV-series ultimately was bought by Netflix.

Gerben works with Shane Gillis and John McKeever ("McKeever"). Gerben has been on several episodes of the Sketch comedy series, Gilly and Keeves, produced by Gillis and McKeever. He was also in Delco Proper, another series set around Philadelphia, and directed by McKeever and written by Gillis. Another project he has acted in was as Mayor Steve in Holly and the Hot Chocolate Movie, a movie produced by McKeever.

Outside of his comedy and acting career, he worked at his father's auto-body shop before his career got started and has worked as a paralegal for his brother who is a trademark attorney. After failing out of college, he also worked as a postal carrier in Berwyn, Pennsylvania.

== Personal life ==
Gerben has arthritis, which only allows him to fully use one of his fingers. In 2021, he explained on Matt and Shane's Secret Podcast that COVID-19 made his arthritis worse and the medication he was using stopped working.

He has made appearances on several podcasts and talk shows, including Matt and Shane's Secret Podcast, Flagrant, Late Night with Seth Meyers, No Bad Lies, Look at Dish with Tommy Pope and Chris O'Connor, and RoneDotCom with Adam Ferrone of Barstool Sports.

== External link ==
- Steve Gerben at IMDb
