= Commie Awards =

The Commie Awards was an award show that recognized the best in comedy in various categories. It was produced by Comedy Central and meant to be a replacement for the defunct American Comedy Awards.

The first ceremony aired on the network on December 7, 2003. The show featured Rodney Dangerfield receiving a lifetime achievement award. However, for unknown reasons the network discontinued the awards and would not air another comedy awards ceremony until the 2011 Comedy Awards.
