= Shane Gillis =

American comedian and actor (born 1987)

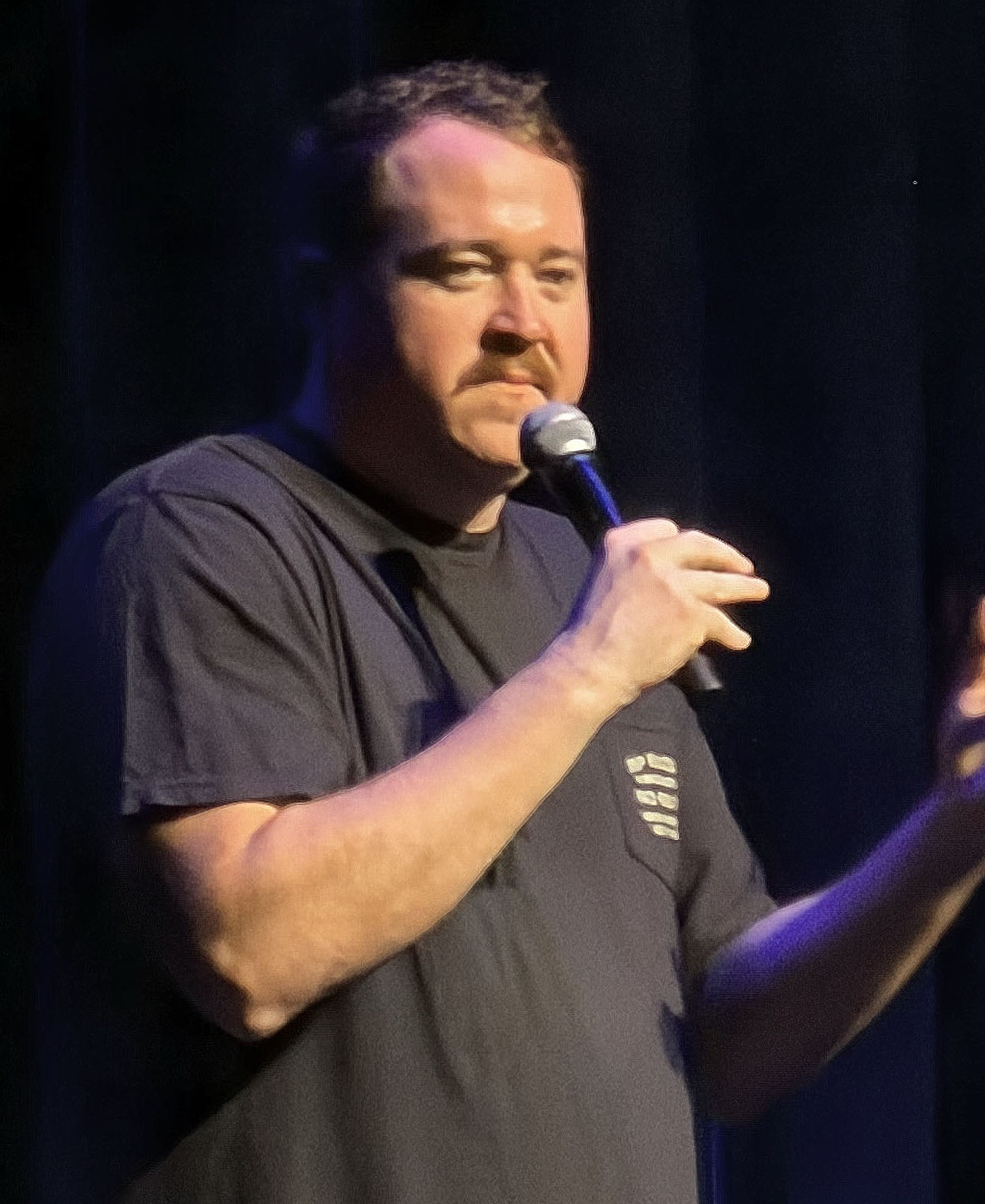
- Gillis performing in 2025
- Born: Shane Michael Gillis; December 11, 1987 (age 38); Mechanicsburg, Pennsylvania, U.S.
- Education: West Chester University (BA)

Comedy career
- Years active: 2012–present
- Medium: Stand-up; television; podcast
- Genres: Observational comedy; black humor; blue humor; shock humor; insult comedy; satire
- Subjects: Everyday life; current events; pop culture; American politics; race relations; self-deprecation; drinking culture; sports; developmental disabilities; American history

YouTube information
- Channel: Gilly and Keeves
- Years active: 2020–present
- Genre: Comedy
- Subscribers: 1.1 million
- Views: 147 million
- Last updated: August 27, 2025
- Website: shanemgillis.com

Shane Michael Gillis (born December 11, 1987) is an American stand-up comedian, actor, and podcaster. He started performing stand-up in 2012, and in 2016, along with fellow stand-up comedian Matt McCusker, began co-hosting Matt and Shane's Secret Podcast, the most subscribed-to podcast on Patreon as of 2024. Gillis had a breakout year in 2019; the Just for Laughs festival in Montreal named him one of its "New Faces" in July, and in September he was announced as a newly hired cast member on NBC's sketch comedy series Saturday Night Live (SNL). He later became the subject of controversy and was fired after five days at SNL due to backlash over clips from his podcast from 2018 in which he and his co-host used derogatory language, including racial and homophobic slurs.

In 2020, Gillis launched the online sketch series Gilly & Keeves in collaboration with filmmaker John McKeever, and he released his first comedy special, Shane Gillis: Live in Austin, on YouTube in 2021. In 2023, his second comedy special, Shane Gillis: Beautiful Dogs, was released on Netflix. As of 2024, Gillis has starred in the Netflix comedy series Tires, which he co-created with McKeever and Steve Gerben. The first season premiered in May 2024, and a second and third season followed in June 2025 and August 2026, respectively.

== Early life and education ==
Gillis was born on December 11, 1987, in Mechanicsburg, Pennsylvania, a town located outside of Harrisburg. His parents are both of Irish Catholic heritage. While attending Trinity High School in nearby Lower Allen Township, he played on the school's football team as an offensive tackle. He graduated in 2006. Listed at 6 ft 4 in (193 cm), 275 lb (125 kg), he was recruited to play for the Army Black Knights at the United States Military Academy in West Point, New York.

He quickly transferred out of West Point during his first year, and played a year of football at Elon University in North Carolina. After quitting the team and no longer attending class, Gillis was expelled from Elon and returned to his parents' house, where he lived while attending community college. Gillis ultimately graduated from West Chester University in Pennsylvania with a degree in history. After graduating, he worked for a time as a Honda salesman, and later spent six months teaching English in Spain.

== Career ==
=== 2012–2019: Early career ===
Gillis began performing comedy in 2012. He regularly performed in Harrisburg and Lancaster, Pennsylvania. To further his career, he relocated to Philadelphia, living near University City with fellow comedian Matt McCusker. In 2015, he placed third at Helium Comedy Club's annual "Philly's Phunniest" tournament, and he won the tournament the next year. In 2016, Gillis began Matt and Shane's Secret Podcast with McCusker. In 2017, Gillis became a frequent guest on The Bonfire with Big Jay Oakerson and Dan Soder, increasing his popularity. From June 2018 until August 2019, he appeared as a co-host on a weekly show on Compound Media called A Fair One with Tommy Pope.

In 2019, after relocating to New York City to further pursue comedy, Comedy Central named Gillis an "Up Next" comedian as he performed at Comedy Central's Clusterfest. That same year, Gillis was recognized as a "New Face" at the Just for Laughs comedy festival in Montreal. During an interview for All Things Considered at that festival, Gillis was interrupted by stand-up comedian Robert Kelly, who said, "You're very funny, dude ... I mean, I wanted to hate it." The interviewer, Andrew Limbong, described Gillis's set at the festival, writing: "Shane Gillis gives off post-jock energy—like someone who used to play a sport in school, then had the self-awareness to realize he wasn't cut out for it and stopped—but he isn't bitter about it at all. His friendly demeanor distracts you, while he sneaks in just a whiff of social insight within a barrage of self-deprecating sex jokes."

=== 2019: Saturday Night Live hiring and firing ===
Gillis's addition to Saturday Night Live (SNL) as a featured cast member was announced on September 12, 2019, along with Chloe Fineman and Bowen Yang (who is gay and Chinese-American).

Later that day, however, several clips surfaced from a since-removed 2018 episode of Matt and Shane's Secret Podcast, in which Gillis and co-host Matt McCusker jokingly discussed Chinatown, Manhattan, in mock East Asian accents and used the word "chink", an ethnic slur for Chinese people. Gillis argued that although the jokes were regrettable, especially when taken out of context, the intent behind them had been misunderstood; in using the slur, specifically, he was claimed that he was imitating an imagined 1940s white landlord, not expressing a view of his own.

In other clips, Gillis and co-host Matt McCusker ranked comedians by race, gender and sexual orientation, which included the use of gay slurs. Later that night, Gillis posted a tweet saying that "I'm a comedian who pushes boundaries" and that "if you go through my 10 years of comedy, most of it bad, you're going to find a lot of bad misses. I'm happy to apologize to anyone who's actually offended by anything I've said." Four days later, a spokesperson for SNL executive producer Lorne Michaels announced that Gillis had been removed from the cast.

Afterward, Gillis maintained that the clips had been misleadingly disassociated from their context, and that he was misquoted in the majority of articles reporting the story. Gillis also expressed regret for his "corny" description of himself as "a comedian who pushes boundaries", noting he had "literally 5 minutes of being pressured to write anything", and stating that he officially retracted it.

Five years after the incident, Michaels revealed that the decision to fire Gillis was not his and had been forced on him by NBC executives.

=== 2020–present: Career expansion ===
In December 2020, Gillis and comedian John McKeever launched the web series Gilly and Keeves, featuring comedy sketches starring Gillis and McKeever such as "ISIS Toyota", "Uncle Daycare", and "Trump Speed Dating". On September 7, 2021, Gillis released his first live comedy special, Shane Gillis: Live in Austin on YouTube. Comedy website The Laugh Button ranked Gillis's special in second place in their top 20 comedy specials of 2021. Since 2021, Gillis has made a series of appearances on Joe Rogan's podcast The Joe Rogan Experience alongside comics Mark Normand and Ari Shaffir, known as the "Protect Our Parks" episodes. Gillis released his second live comedy special, Shane Gillis: Beautiful Dogs on September 5, 2023, on Netflix. Since 2018, Shane Gillis has been a regular part of the annual comedy festival Skankfest.

In 2023, Gillis had a recurring role on the Peacock series Bupkis, starring Pete Davidson. In 2024, Gillis hosted the February 24 episode of Saturday Night Live (season 49, episode 12), nearly four and a half years after his firing from the show in September 2019. Gillis' hosting received mixed reviews.

In February 2024, Gillis struck a deal with Netflix for a scripted workplace comedy as well as his second special with the streamer. Gillis would serve as an executive producer, a writer and co-creator of the show Tires based on his pilot on YouTube. The six-episode series premiered on May 23 on the service. Tires was renewed for a second season on May 21, 2024. In 2024, Gillis also appeared in the music video for Eminem's new single "Houdini."

In October 2024, during a comedy festival entitled Skankfest in Las Vegas, Gillis stated that he declined an offer to impersonate Donald Trump for the entire 50th season of SNL to attend "Coke Magic", one of the shows at the festival.

Gillis appears in the movie Easy's Waltz, in a supporting role that was originally written for comedian Norm Macdonald, who died before the film began production.

In February 2025, Gillis appeared in an advertisement for Bud Light titled "Big Men on Cul-De-Sac," which aired during Super Bowl LIX. He appeared in the advertisement with Peyton Manning and Post Malone. This ad was seen as an attempt by Anheuser-Busch to win back its traditionally masculine audience after the 2023 Bud Light boycott, although it received a mixed reception from ad critics.

In March 2025, Gillis was added as a playable character to the video game EA Sports College Football 25's Ultimate Team mode, as a 98-rated middle linebacker for the Notre Dame Fighting Irish, as part of the 'Names of the Game' promotional event.

On July 16, Gillis hosted ESPN's 2025 ESPY Awards.

In May 2026, Gillis hosted The Roast of Kevin Hart in Los Angeles and produced by Netflix.

On July 17, 2026, Gillis broke the Guinness World Record for the largest audience for a comedian with 73,946 attending his comedy show at Lincoln Financial Field in Philadelphia. This sold-out show also broke the record for the most tickets sold to a solo comedy show, selling 76,212 tickets.

On October 10, 2026, Gillis hosted Saturday Night Live for a third time. His monologue, in which he said women who go to the gym "just dress like whores now", was criticized for being sexist. Several comedians criticized him, including Dan Levy, who labeled his comments as "misogynist", adding that "the more men speak about women this way in the media, the more men will treat them like 'objects'." Others who criticized Gillis included former SNL cast members Cecily Strong and Ego Nwodim, as well as Kathy Griffin, Jessica Valenti and Jenna Bush Hager. Tony Maglio of The Hollywood Reporter wrote, "It wasn't just the wrong place for the joke — it was decidedly the wrong time" in reference to the 2024 Cornell University rape allegations in the headlines. Ania Magliano, on the October 17 episode of Saturday Night Live UK, referenced and criticized both the monologue's content and Gillis himself.

== Personal life ==
In 2023, Gillis relocated from New York City to Austin, Texas. He has cited Austin's expanding stand-up scene—particularly activity around Joe Rogan's Comedy Mothership—and practical considerations such as Texas's lack of a state income tax as reasons for the move. In a January 2024 appearance on This Past Weekend, he said he wanted "to live in a place where you can do stand-up during the week," noting that opportunities had expanded beyond New York and Los Angeles to cities such as Nashville and Austin. He has also remarked on aspects of living in Texas during appearances on The Joe Rogan Experience, including frequent statewide emergency alerts.

Gillis was in a relationship with social media personality Grace Brassel. The couple publicly confirmed the relationship in July 2024 and have appeared together at public events, including during Gillis's hosting of the 2025 ESPY Awards. In November 2025, People Magazine reported that they had separated "a number of months" prior.

Gillis attended the UFC Freedom 250 event on June 14, 2026, on the South Lawn of the White House. At the event, he criticized remarks made by Josh Hokit targeting Michelle Obama.

== Filmography ==
=== Film ===
Year	Title	Role	Notes
2025	Easy's Waltz	TBA	
2026	Madden	Vince McGary	

=== Television ===
Year	Title	Role	Notes
2016	Delco Proper	Voice	Episode: "For the Troops"
2020–2021	Gilly and Keeves	Various roles	Also writer; 12 episodes
2023	Bupkis	Gilly	2 episodes
2024–2026	Saturday Night Live	Himself (host)	4 episodes (3 as host, 1 cameo)
2024–present	Tires	Shane	18 episodes; also creator, writer, executive producer

=== Stand-up specials ===
Year	Title	Notes
2021	Shane Gillis: Live in Austin	YouTube comedy special
2023	Shane Gillis: Beautiful Dogs	Netflix comedy special
