= Tires (TV series) =

American TV series

- Genre: Sitcom; Workplace comedy
- Created by: Shane Gillis; Steve Gerben; John McKeever
- Directed by: John McKeever
- Starring: Shane Gillis; Steve Gerben; Chris O'Connor; Kilah Fox; Stavros Halkias; Thomas Haden Church
- Country of origin: United States
- Original language: English
- No. of seasons: 3
- No. of episodes: 30

Production
- Executive producers: John McKeever; Shane Gillis; Steve Gerben; Brandon James; Brian Stern; Ken Slotnick; Becky Astphan
- Running time: 20–23 minutes
- Production companies: Dad Sick Productions; AGI Entertainment; Rough House Pictures

Original release
- Network: Netflix
- Release: May 23, 2024 – present

Tires is an American workplace comedy television series created by Shane Gillis, Steve Gerben, and John McKeever. The series stars Gillis, Gerben, and a supporting cast consisting of Chris O'Connor, Kilah Fox, and Stavros Halkias. The series premiered on May 23, 2024, on Netflix. The second season premiered in June 2025 and the third in August 2026.

== Premise ==
The story focuses on Will, who manages the West Chester, Pennsylvania, location of his family's struggling auto-repair chain, "Valley Forge Automotive Center". As Will endeavors to revitalize the business, he is met with persistent harassment from his obnoxious cousin and employee, Shane, who torments and undermines Will at every chance.

== Cast ==
=== Main ===
- Shane Gillis as Shane Flanagan
- Steve Gerben as Will Jacobs
- Chris O'Connor as Cal
- Kilah Fox as Kilah
- Stavros Halkias as Dave
- Thomas Haden Church as Phil Flanagan (recurring, season 2; main, season 3–present)

=== Recurring and guest stars ===
- Andrew Schulz as Andy
- Rachel Blanchard as Bonnie
- Tommy Pope as Tommy
- Anthony Moore as Anthony
- Ryan Farrell as Ryan
- Peter Reeves as Jon Jacobs
- John McKeever as Chuck
- Matt McCusker as Max
- Steph Tolev as Barb
- Joe DeRosa as Joe
- Francis Ellis as George
- Veronika Slowikowska as Kelly
- Kerryn Feehan as Reagan
- Rachel Keefe as Amber
- Ryan Shaner as Darren
- Mike Rainey as Mike
- Tim Butterly as Tim
- H. Foley as Pete Seidel
- Emely Cartagena as Alexis
- Rachel Aspen as Molly
- Ellen McAlpine as Vicki
- Mary Radzinski as Mary
- Tobie Windham as Mitchell
- Jon Lovitz as Irate Customer
- Ron White as Ron Dobbins
- Vince Vaughn as Mike
- Jay Oakerson as Dogman
- John Feitelberg as Mark
- Tritt Matthews as Conference Attendee #1
- Hassie Harrison as Colleen
- Diana Cherkas as Lydia
- Alexa Albanese as Lisa
- Sofia Hasmik as Lucy
- Anjelica Bette Fellini as Cara
- Taylor Misiak as Jill
- Jac Bernhard as Jared
- Dan Soder as Frank
- Bobby Lee as Ricky

== Episodes ==
=== Series overview ===
Season	Episodes	Originally released
1	6	May 24, 2024
2	12	June 5, 2025
3	12	August 13, 2026

=== Season 1 (2024) ===
No. overall	No. in season	Title	Directed by	Written by	Original release date
1	1	"The Initiative"	John McKeever	Shane Gillis, Steve Gerben, & John McKeever	May 24, 2024
Will is a manager at Valley Forge Automotive Center in West Chester. He accidentally orders more than 500 tires and develops a superficial, women-focused promotional campaign using pink posters to attract more female customers. A reporter interviews Will for a light-hearted puff piece about the initiative, but the conversation quickly turns hostile when his immature cousin Shane treats the interview as a joke. Will is also unable to explain any meaningful steps behind the campaign beyond the posters and falsely claims that Kilah, the garage's only female employee, was hired as part of the initiative. Shane then offers the reporter an insincere apology, taking credit for the campaign and claiming that he genuinely wants women to feel comfortable in the male-dominated environment. His plan almost succeeds until the Adiamo brothers from the neighbouring car dealership enter the garage and resume an earlier sexually charged conversation about their recently hired large-breasted female employee. As a last-ditch effort to avoid negative coverage, Will purchases four months of expensive advertising in the reporter's newspaper.
2	2	"Windows of Opportunity"	John McKeever	Shane Gillis, Steve Gerben, & John McKeever	May 24, 2024
Shane is offered a lucrative job selling windows by his old school friend George Blaine. Meanwhile, Will is forced to send one of his mechanics to the Belmont branch because of his own branch's poor sales. District manager Dave wants Shane transferred, so Will invents several criticisms of him in an attempt to keep him at West Chester. Dave later repeats the remarks to Shane, driving a wedge between the cousins. Dave forces Will to give Shane a performance review, during which the pair snipe at each other until Will admits why he lied about him, allowing them to reconcile. After learning the truth, Dave insists that Shane transfer to Belmont, prompting Shane to accept George's job offer. However, when Shane discovers the new role would require him to wake at 4 a.m. and work long days for less money, he turns it down. When a customer complains about the delay in repairing her car, an irate Will goes to fire his mechanic Arnold for disobeying him and for earlier insubordination, only to discover that Arnold has died while working. With the branch now short a mechanic, Shane is able to remain at West Chester.
3	3	"Sales Contest"	John McKeever	Shane Gillis, Steve Gerben, & John McKeever	May 24, 2024
Dave pits the West Chester and Belmont branches against each other in a sales competition because of their poor turnover, using a cheap oil-change promotion to attract customers before upselling additional repairs. Outside, Shane confronts Dave over his suspicion that the promotion is a sign Valley Forge is struggling. Three customers arrive: a Chinese man accompanied by a translator, an older woman who flirts with Shane, and a "white trash" couple. Encouraged by Shane, Will makes inappropriate sexual advances toward the woman, while his attempt to speak Mandarin drives away the Chinese customer, leaving the store without a sale. Shane eventually persuades the remaining couple to authorize additional repairs, but they abscond without paying. Will realizes that the oil-change promotion is attracting poor-quality customers and instead proposes selling his excess tires at a low price, reasoning that tire customers are more likely to generate additional repair work.
4	4	"The Rumor Mill"	John McKeever	Shane Gillis, Steve Gerben, & John McKeever	May 24, 2024
To generate business, Will hires Anthony, a graphic designer, to create marketing materials for his low-cost tire initiative. During a private conversation, Cal tells Will that he has heard Valley Forge intends to sell its lowest-performing store. While Will is distracted, Shane instructs Anthony to produce materials advertising a bikini car wash. Will calls each Valley Forge branch in an attempt to reach his father, the company's owner, and discovers that Shane has been spreading embarrassing rumours about him. He sends a company-wide email refuting the claims, but accidentally forwards it to all 7,000 customers on the mailing list. Dave later tells Will that the rumour about selling a single store is false, but reveals that his father has met with Marilyn's Mufflers and is considering selling the entire chain. Desperate to generate sales for his tire promotion, Will reluctantly agrees to Shane's bikini car wash.
5	5	"Bikini Car Wash"	John McKeever	Shane Gillis, Steve Gerben, & John McKeever	May 24, 2024
Kilah provides five attractive women for Will and Shane's bikini car wash, but Lydia from Marilyn's Mufflers arrives at the same time and tells Will that the buyout is likely to proceed and that she is there to assess the property. When Will challenges her, Lydia explains that while some floor staff may be retained, all management positions would be made redundant. Shane attempts to hide the women in a shipping container behind the store, but they are spotted by a passerby. He instead takes them to the diner next door until Lydia leaves. The bikini car wash begins, and the first customer nearly results in a successful sale before one of the women slips and smashes his windscreen with her face. Shane gives the group a rallying speech, and the car wash continues, becoming a sales success. A police officer later arrives in response to the shipping-container incident and orders them to shut down because of the open drinking and car wash, just as Lydia returns and photographs the scene. At closing time, one of the women, Reagan, implies that she and Will should have sex.
6	6	"Dad"	John McKeever	Shane Gillis, Steve Gerben, & John McKeever	May 24, 2024
The following morning, the West Chester crew celebrate Will having sex. After the Adiamo brothers bring him a celebratory cake, Will's father arrives, lists Will's various failings, and reveals that Marilyn's Mufflers has reduced its offer for the business because of the bikini car wash. John takes the store keys from Will, who leaves. Feeling guilty for failing to defend him, Shane promotes Will's tire initiative to John. John dismisses it, arguing that Will's ideas always lose money and mocking his lack of a girlfriend. Shane counters that Will has just had sex and shows John sales figures indicating that customers who purchase tires almost always authorize additional work. John then calls Will and agrees to proceed with his low-cost tire plan before making a final decision on the sale.

=== Season 2 (2025) ===
No. overall	No. in season	Title	Directed by	Written by	Original release date
7	1	"Bonus Money"	John McKeever	Shane Gillis, Steve Gerben, & John McKeever	June 5, 2025
Will's low-cost tire initiative becomes Valley Forge's most successful marketing campaign, generating significant profits for the business and bonuses for the staff, which Shane uses to buy a gun. Eager to expand Valley Forge, Will arranges a meeting with his father to apply for a loan, leaving Shane in charge of the auto center. Shane repeatedly ignores an irate customer (Jon Lovitz) who demands free services and refuses to believe his car needs the recommended repairs. Shane invites him into the work area to see for himself, where Cal mistakes the customer for Shane and pulls Shane's gun on him as a prank. The customer falls over and claims to be injured, forcing Cal to surrender his new smartwatch to avoid a lawsuit. Will visits his father at head office and catches Dave having an affair with the receptionist, Lisa. Dave tells him that John is not genuinely interested in pursuing the loan, so Will attends the meeting alone. Although six months of improved tire sales demonstrate progress, the company's previous financial performance makes the loan a high risk for the bank. Will delivers a speech that appears to sway the decision in his favour.
8	2	"HR"	John McKeever	Shane Gillis, Steve Gerben, & John McKeever	June 5, 2025
Following the gun incident, John requires the reluctant managers to undergo HR training so Valley Forge can obtain employment practices liability insurance. Shane joins the session but is soon ejected for repeatedly derailing it. Afterwards, Cal tells Shane that Will only wants Valley Forge to succeed and is trying to include him in that success, so Shane should help rather than hinder him. When the HR presenter, Carmen, prepares to leave because of the staff's behaviour, Shane persuades her to stay and helps deliver the training in his own style. Meanwhile, Dave's wife, Barb, discovers his affair but mistakenly assumes Kilah is his mistress and searches for him across the Valley Forge stores. Dave privately asks Carmen to let him take the test early so he can leave before Barb finds him. Barb then catches Dave with Carmen, assumes she is another affair partner, and insults her until Carmen slaps her, leaving Barb screaming. Some time later, Dave passes the HR test while the other managers wait outside.
9	3	"Inspection"	John McKeever	Bobby Telatovich, Steve Gerben, & John McKeever	June 5, 2025
An inspection of Valley Forge identifies black mold spread throughout the roof, and the staff worries that it has left them with health problems. While looking through previous inspection files, Will finds a love note to his father and a nude picture of his mother. Shane finds the picture and, ignoring Will's warning, objectifies it before learning it is of his aunt, leaving both men despondent. Finally, Shane asks a customer, Kelly (Veronika Slowikowska), out on a date.
10	4	"Shiny New Thing"	John McKeever	Bobby Telatovich, Steve Gerben, & John McKeever	June 5, 2025
Will is tasked by his father with negotiating a discount from True Thread Tires and is eager to prove that he can be a tough negotiator. The True Thread representative, Ryan, is similarly good-natured and determined to show his colleagues that he can negotiate firmly. The pair bond over their similarities, but Ryan ultimately reveals that True Thread actually needs to raise its prices. Will agrees to the increase in exchange for tickets to a major tire expo. Dave attempts to intervene and secure a discount, but Ryan rejects his underhanded negotiating tactics. Meanwhile, Shane meets with his wealthy businessman father, Phil, who tries to make Shane flirt with their waitress. Phil is eager to repair their distant relationship and suggests opening a nearby business so he can remain local and employ Shane. Shane refuses, resenting Phil's interference in his life. He returns to the garage and also turns down Will's offer to take the open manager's position.
11	5	"Record High"	John McKeever	Joe DeRosa, Steve Gerben, & John McKeever	June 5, 2025
Shane's old school friend George has lost his window business after violating HR rules. Will hires him for the management position that Shane turned down, unaware that George has a serious cocaine addiction. Will later confronts George but discovers that he has already broken the store's sales record, prompting him to let George continue working. As George's behaviour becomes increasingly erratic, Will fears that he may become violent if fired and tells Shane to find and hide his cocaine. George and Cal take the stash into the bathroom and impulsively use some of it. A twitchy Shane later confesses to Kelly that he has taken drugs and tells her he wants to pursue a serious relationship with her. A drunken Phil arrives at the garage to see Shane and tells Kelly that Shane had been flirting with their waitress. Kelly leaves after clarifying that she and Shane are not dating. Meanwhile, Will fires George, telling him to find a job that allows him to use as much cocaine as he wants; George is subsequently hired as a salesman at the Adiamo brothers' car dealership.
12	6	"The Tri-State Mid Market Tire Expo"	John McKeever	Amy McLeish-Milligan, Steve Gerben, & John McKeever	June 5, 2025
Will and Shane attend the Tri-State Mid-Market Tire Expo, where Will tries to avoid Ryan from Tru Thread because he is still waiting to hear about the bank loan. After another manager tells him about building a successful auto-garage empire by taking risks, Will agrees to purchase 3,000 tires from Ryan. Meanwhile, Shane unsuccessfully tries to obtain tickets to a show by aggressive sales motivational speaker Brock Majors. He meets Mike (Vince Vaughn), a salesman who advises him to present himself as a manager rather than a mechanic to earn more respect from the expo attendees. Shane secures a substantial discount from another dealer, prompting Will to demand the same terms from True Thread. Ryan agrees, and Will and Shane also receive tickets to the show. Dave is notified of the tire order and informs Jon, who calls Will and admits that the bank approved the loan, but he rejected it because he wants to retire and cannot do so while carrying a million-dollar debt. At Brock's show, Ryan volunteers to participate in an exercise intended to take his salesmanship to the next level. Brock bullies and humiliates Ryan and Will on stage, forcing Will to admit that he has to cancel the order. Afterwards, Mike berates Brock on Shane and Will's behalf. Inspired, Will calls Phil to discuss a business opportunity. Meanwhile, Shane calls Kelly, who has not been returning his calls, to tell her that he wants to be with her.
13	7	"Free Fries"	John McKeever	Shane Gillis, Steve Gerben, & John McKeever	June 5, 2025
Shane supervises two vocational-technical students on work experience, but they show little interest in actually working. In retaliation, he sends them to buy alcohol while underage and arranges for his police officer friend, Max, to threaten them with arrest. Afterwards, the boys begin working hard and learning mechanical skills. Once they leave, Shane visits Kelly. She tells him that she likes him but finds him too weird for a relationship. Shane asks if they can start over, and Kelly agrees. Will meets with Phil to discuss working together, but Phil suggests allowing Jon to sell Valley Forge so that Will and Shane can work for him instead, knowing that Shane will only agree if Will comes too. Phil takes Will on a bar crawl before eventually prompting him to ask for a loan. Will does so, but Phil refuses. Instead, Phil reveals that he intends to buy Valley Forge himself so he can work with Shane, although he knows Shane will hate the idea.
14	8	"Retirement"	John McKeever	Shane Gillis, Steve Gerben, & John McKeever	June 5, 2025
Jon's retirement party is held at the Valley Forge garage. Shane remains upset after learning that his father is now his boss and tries to persuade Jon not to retire, fearing that Phil will sell the business and leave him and Will unemployed. Jon confronts Phil, who assures him that he has no intention of selling, because the endeavor is entirely to give him time with Shane. Phil also attempts to speak with Shane, but makes little progress because Shane resents his efforts to control his life. Dave attends the party and desperately tries to gain Phil's favour, even pretending to be religious. Lisa also arrives with her boyfriend, Ron, whom Dave suspects knows about their affair. Dave eventually drops the pretence and admits that he slept with Lisa, prompting her and Ron to storm out. After John's retirement speech, Phil gives one of his own, announcing that he intends to take Valley Forge to the next level and is giving Will and Shane a combined 10% stake in the business, leading them to give him their support.
15	9	"The Radio Ad"	John McKeever	Michael J. Gleason, Steve Gerben, & John McKeever	June 5, 2025
16	10	"Patriots and Traitors"	John McKeever	Amy McLeish-Milligan, Steve Gerben, & John McKeever	June 5, 2025
17	11	"Misery Has Company"	John McKeever	Shane Gillis, Steve Gerben, & John McKeever	June 5, 2025
18	12	"At What Cost"	John McKeever	Chris O'Connor, Steve Gerben, & John McKeever	June 5, 2025

=== Season 3 (2026) ===
No. overall	No. in season	Title	Directed by	Written by	Original release date
19	1	"It Often Rhymes"	John McKeever	John McKeever	August 13, 2026
On his first day in the role, Will is tasked by Phil with firing Mike Weir because of his poor sales figures. The assignment becomes more difficult when Will learns that Mike is well liked by the Valley Forge staff, his wife has recently left him, and he injured his leg at work but declined to sue out of loyalty to the company. After discovering that Mike's store is also underperforming because of several problems he has failed to report, Will ultimately decides not to fire him, instead ordering him to improve. When Phil learns that Will has ignored his instructions, he refuses to consider any of Will's marketing ideas. Meanwhile, Shane sees his former girlfriend Jill Stewart on a dating app and, realizing she is single, becomes interested in pursuing her again.
20	2	"Secret Shopper"	John McKeever	Steve Gerben	August 13, 2026
Dave sends an attractive young woman, Holly, into Valley Forge's lowest-performing stores as a secret shopper. At each location, employees fail to upsell to her, offer excessive discounts, and openly sexually harass her despite her lack of interest. Dave also persuades Phil to let him send Holly into Will's store to avoid the appearance of favoritism, while secretly intending to use her to target and humiliate Will by paying her to entrap him. Holly flirts with Will, who believes she is genuinely interested in him. He is nearly persuaded to give her a discount until Shane intervenes, suspicious of her behaviour. Impressed by Will's kind nature, Holly nevertheless rejects him when he asks her out. Shane then discovers that she is a secret shopper, and he and Will confront her just as she is about to confess out of guilt. Meanwhile, Kilah notices a van parked outside the store and suspects someone is watching them. She calls the police, reporting it as a rape van. The police find Dave inside with an erection after looking at Holly's Instagram and forcibly subdue him.
21	3	"Women's Business"	John McKeever	Chris O'Connor	August 13, 2026
Will takes Kilah with him to a networking event hosted by the West Chester Women's Business Association (WCWBA). Later, Shane and Cal decide to also go to the event. At the WCWBA event, Will observes the abrasive host, Jenny, arguing with her television-presenter husband, Max Goodman. Jenny takes an immediate dislike to Kilah after seeing Max flirt with her. Will inadvertently joins a group of women, including Kathy and Moira, who assume he is gay and that Shane is his partner based on his complaints about him. Shane and Cal later arrive at the party, further irritating Jenny. Kilah then mistakenly accuses Jenny of being Max's affair partner, causing Jenny, Moira, and Kathy to begin sniping at one another. When the women discover that Will is not gay, they reconcile and throw Will, Shane, Kilah, and Cal out.
22	4	"What's That Like"	John McKeever	John McKeever	August 13, 2026
Will attempts to manage the negative publicity following the WCWBA event, including accusations that he pretended to be gay and masturbated. After dreaming that his father steals a young woman from him, Shane resolves to get his life in order and joins a gym. While there, he stares at Brooke, a young woman exercising, and is confronted by her boyfriend. Shane makes several remarks defending his right to objectify her before realizing the couple are influencers who lure men into compromising situations for content and are secretly filming him. He suffers a panic attack, collapses, and is taken to hospital. Will later stumbles upon a meeting from which he was deliberately excluded between Phil, Dave, and Pete, who now works for Taka Taka Tires, about changing Valley Forge's tire supplier. Shane arrives and, while medicated, sides with Will against accepting Pete's offer. Dave then tells Will that he will do whatever it takes to secure a senior position.
23	5	"Wings"	John McKeever	Sam Mazany	August 13, 2026
Shane notices an older man sitting across from him in a bar who bears several similarities to him, and is traumatized when the man suddenly dies. Despite this, Shane refuses attempts by others to support him. Afraid of dying alone, he repeatedly messages Jill without receiving a response before deleting his account. At a church-themed bar, he meets Lucy, and the pair eventually return home and have sex, with Shane overcoming his fixation on the older man's death. Will encounters an old friend, Taylor Stellan, with whom he once nearly went into business. At the time, Will was too afraid to risk leaving his job, only to later be made redundant. Taylor, meanwhile, has become highly successful as the CEO of his company, Slapshot Media.
24	6	"The Locked Room"	John McKeever	Steve Gerben	August 13, 2026
The following morning at Lucy's home, she suggests seeing Shane again, although he believes their age and political differences would make a relationship difficult. Meanwhile, experiencing problems with Bonnie, Phil orders Will and Shane to secure a new fleet deal with City Wide Bagel. Jill visits Shane at Valley Forge in response to his messages, and the pair agree to a date. Bonnie later breaks up with Phil because of his devotion to work and lack of time for her. Frustrated with Will and Shane, Phil goes to their branch, confronts Shane, and removes them both as business partners, revealing that he has sent Dave to fire Mike Weir. Afterwards, Shane receives a text from Lucy asking him to hang out.
25	7	"Six of Swords"	John McKeever	Bobby Telatovich	August 13, 2026
Will meets with Bonnie to apologize for Shane's behaviour and attempt to reconcile her with Phil, who has been ignoring him, but she reveals that Phil is the real problem. Bonnie advises Will that if he cannot communicate with Phil, he should remain open to new opportunities, prompting him to recall his earlier encounter with Taylor. Lucy calls Shane for help when her car breaks down, and the pair end up having sex again. Afterwards, they argue about Shane's desire to have children. Shane suggests that Jill, already being a mother, would be more open to having children than Lucy. Outside, he encounters Lucy's friend Cara, who tells him that Lucy genuinely likes him.
26	8	"Volley"	John McKeever	John McKeever	August 13, 2026
Shane goes on a date with Jill. While drinking in the woods to recreate their youth, she offers to perform oral sex on him, but police arrive, mistake them for underage drinkers, and give chase, resulting in Jill falling into a pit. Shane takes Jill home, and they kiss on her doorstep as Lucy's roommate Cara, who is babysitting for Jill, comes outside and sees them. Dave attends a business meeting with Pete and representatives of Taka Taka, unaware that it is being held at a strip club, making it difficult for him to remain committed to his sex addiction therapy. Dave is pressured to drink excessively, and Pete then arranges for him to receive a lap dance and secretly photographs it. While out drinking, Kilah encounters her former high school volleyball teammates and realizes she has been excluded from their reunion. One of the women begins flirting with Cal, leaving Kilah isolated. Shane later meets Kilah at a bar and encourages her to confront her former friends. She publicly rebukes them for excluding her before she, Shane, and Cal return to the garage to play volleyball together. Will visits Phil's home to discuss their tension. Phil reveals that he intends to hire an experienced general manager to get Valley Forge back on track. Will tells Phil that he has been offered another job, and Phil tells him to take it.
27	9	"Dog's Out of the Fence"	John McKeever	Charles Blyzniuk	August 13, 2026
Will takes a week off work and is temporarily replaced as manager by Joe. Meanwhile, Pete blackmails Dave into agreeing to the Taka Taka deal by threatening to send photographs of him receiving a lap dance to his wife, but is unable to finalize the agreement without Will's approval. Lucy arrives to collect her car, but Shane initially pretends to be asleep before the pair argue again. Shane later fails to persuade Will to work with him to turn the business around. Will then arranges to meet Taylor the following day to discuss a potential opportunity.
28	10	"Tigers at the Circus"	John McKeever	Steve Gerben	August 13, 2026
Will meets Taylor to discuss the opportunity, but they realize there has been a misunderstanding: Taylor believed Will wanted to hire his company for marketing rather than seek employment. Taylor tells Will that he cannot offer him a job. Shane invites Jill to a party hosted by Taka Taka, but she makes excuses before admitting that Cara told her he is sleeping with Lucy. Jill ends their relationship, saying Shane is too unstable for her given that she has children. Shane suffers a breakdown and takes Will, Pete, and Dave on an erratic high-speed test drive, eventually hitting a pothole and spinning out. Noticing that the tires remain undamaged, Will and Shane become convinced of their quality despite the company's poor reviews. They negotiate a deal with Taka Taka's owner in which the company will pay the leases on their stores in exchange for Valley Forge exclusively using Taka Taka tires for one year.
29	11	"Let's Just See"	John McKeever	Grace Cohen	August 13, 2026
Dave struggles with having betrayed his wife and decides he must tell her the truth about the lap dance. When he returns home, however, he finds Barb having sex with Jerry, a hot tub salesman. Barb admits that she now finds Dave too mild and never wanted him to change, only to stop cheating on her behind her back. The pair agree to an open relationship on the condition that they remain honest with each other. Phil refuses to approve the Taka Taka deal while distracted by his separation from Bonnie. Shane agrees to a relaxation session with Bonnie in an effort to help reconcile the couple. She gives him a hallucinogenic tea, but instead of sipping it, he drinks the entire dose. Shane experiences a vision that continues his earlier dreams of being a Viking villager, in which he tells villagers resembling his co-workers and family that he must set out on his own because he can no longer remain under Phil's control. Grateful to Shane for helping him reconcile with Bonnie, Phil tells him and Will that he intends to travel the world with her and is therefore handing full control of Valley Forge over to them in his absence.
30	12	"It's a Good Day, West Chester"	John McKeever	John McKeever & Grace Cohen	August 13, 2026
Will and Shane are approached by representatives of Coastal Tires with an offer to buy the entire chain, but Will refuses. The representatives warn them to accept before Coastal moves into the area and renders Valley Forge worthless. Will and Shane appear on Good Day West Chester to promote the business. Shane takes an interest in the producer, Jamie, who invites him out for drinks. During the segment, Will gives a stilted performance, overwhelmed by anxiety and the pressure of managing the business, while Shane makes sexist remarks. Shane eventually salvages the interview by promoting Taka Taka tires and encouraging Will to speak more confidently. The segment quickly descends into chaos when Shane connects his phone to display Will's Instagram account, and Lucy texts him while the screen is being broadcast, revealing that she is pregnant. At the same time, news breaks that the FBI has raided Valley Forge West Chester to arrest white nationalist Thatch Followman and his nephew Frank. Frank had been regularly visiting Cal to work on his classic car and build a friendship while secretly acting as an informant against Thatch. The raid is broadcast live, followed by an interview with Kilah discussing Dave's suspected "rape van" parked outside the store. Shane later meets Lucy to discuss the pregnancy. Neither is sure how to proceed, but Shane tells her he will support whatever she decides. Back at Valley Forge, the staff rally around him. Lucy later texts Shane asking whether he likes the name Harry for a boy, and he replies, "No. Keep thinking tho."

== Production ==
A pilot for Tires was originally uploaded in 2019 on Gillis' YouTube channel, but was removed prior to the show's premiere. Several years later, Gillis invested in a six-episode first season, which was picked up by Netflix for distribution. The show premiered May 23, 2024. It was renewed for a second season on May 21, 2024.

In November 2024, Thomas Haden Church joined the cast for season two. Church played Phil, the wealthy but immature father of Shane and uncle of Will. On July 1, 2025, Netflix renewed the series for a third season. Season three was released on August 13, 2026. On August 31, 2026, Netflix renewed the series for a fourth season.

== Reception ==
The review aggregator website Rotten Tomatoes reported a 58% average score for season 1. The website's critics consensus for the first season reads, "Tires gets some chuckles by kicking around Shane Gillis' self-aware persona, but this unambitious sitcom will need to rev up the inspiration to get real traction." Metacritic, which uses a weighted average, assigned a score of 44 out of 100 based on 9 critics, indicating "mixed or average reviews". Later seasons have been given a more positive reception, particularly season 3.

The Netflix comedy isn't likely to impress anyone with the originality of its perspective or the sharpness of its wit. But it's not really trying to. By the standards of the low bar it's set for itself, it does just fine.

— Angie Han, The Hollywood Reporter

Several reviewers found the show to be a mildly amusing diversion but unremarkable in its premise. Brian Tallerico of RogerEbert.com wrote: "'Tires' breaks no ground, but I have to admit to being somewhat refreshed by a comedy that doesn't aspire to do much more than make people laugh". Writing for The Washington Post, Lili Loofbourow described the stakes as "slim to nonexistent" and the conflict as minimal, declaring the show simply "fine". In a positive review, John Anderson of The Wall Street Journal wrote that "when [the show] works it's hilarious". He also praised the ability of the writers to find the right mix of offensiveness in jokes, musing that the show might "be a map to the future, or some future, of comedy". In a negative review, Robert Lloyd of the Los Angeles Times described the humor as too "pointedly juvenile" and stated that he "didn't laugh once".
