= Charles Wieand =

American comedian and adventurer

Charles Wieand, also known as Wild Charles, is a comedian, daredevil, adventurer, travel host and YouTube personality. He also hosts a show on Facebook Watch. Wieand is known for his animal & nature videos, such as swimming with alligators, swimming with an anaconda, and beekeeping without clothing. Wieand's show has featured John Godwin, Chris Jericho and Jake Paul. Wieand also performs stand-up comedy.
