= Mateen Stewart =

American stand-up comedian and actor

- Born: Detroit, Michigan, U.S.

Comedy career
- Years active: 2005
- Medium: Stand-up, Television
- Genre: Comedy

Mateen Stewart is an American stand-up comedian and actor.

== Life and career ==
Stewart was born and raised in Detroit, Michigan. He attended Florida A&M University, where he majored in theater. He has appeared on screens with Ben Stiller and Ken Marino and also played the token "Black Guy" in a National McDonald’s commercial. He appeared on Jimmy Kimmel Live! and Last Week Tonight with John Oliver. He has also appeared on an episode of the “I Spent a Day With…” YouTube series by Anthony Padilla.

== Filmography ==
=== Television ===
Year	Title	Role	Note
2011	Funny or Die Presents	Thug	1 episode
2011-2012	NTSF:SD:SUV::	Burglar/Partier	2 episodes
2020	Brain Games	Himself	
