= The Comedy Awards =

American comedy and humor award

- Type: Comedy
- Awarded for: Excellence in comedy
- Country: United States
- First award: 2011
- Final award: 2012

Television/radio coverage
- Network: Comedy Central

The Comedy Awards was an annual award ceremony run by the American television network Comedy Central, honoring the best of comedy. It was held twice, in 2011 and 2012. The 2011 ceremony took place on March 26 and aired on April 10 on CMT, Comedy Central, Logo TV, Nick at Nite, Spike, TV Land and VH1. It debuted on The Comedy Channel in Australia on May 22, 2011.

The Comedy Awards represented Comedy Central's second attempt at creating an annual awards show. Comedy Central’s first attempt, the Commie Awards, ran once in 2003. Comedy Central also hosted the American Comedy Awards in 2001, which was those awards' last successive year after having been founded in 1987.

== Categories ==
The award categories consist of:

=== Film ===
- Comedy Film
- Animated Comedy Film
- Comedy Actor - Film
- Comedy Actress - Film
- Comedy Screenplay
- Comedy Director - Film

=== Television ===
- Comedy Series
- Comedy Actor - Television
- Comedy Actress - Television
- Late Night Comedy Series
- Sketch Comedy/Alternative Comedy Series
- Stand-Up Special
- Animated Comedy Series
- Comedy Writing - Television
- Comedy Directing - Television

=== Viewers Choice ===
- Breakthrough Performer
- Best Viral Original

=== Special awards ===
- Johnny Carson Award for Comedic Excellence
- Comedy Icon Award

== 2011 Comedy Awards ==
Nominations were announced on February 15, 2011. The awards aired on April 10 on Comedy Central and other Viacom-owned networks including Spike, CMT, VH1, LOGO and TV Land. The Comedy Award statuette was created by New York firm Society Awards.

=== Film ===
==== Comedy Icon Award ====
The inaugural Comedy Icon Award was presented to Eddie Murphy by Tracy Morgan.

Comedy Film	Animated Comedy Film
Cyrus; Easy A; Get Him to the Greek; Kick-Ass; The Other Guys	Despicable Me; Megamind; Shrek Forever After; Toy Story 3
Comedy Actor	Comedy Actress
Russell Brand for Get Him to the Greek; Will Ferrell for The Other Guys; Zach Galifianakis for Dinner for Schmucks; Paul Giamatti for Barney's Version; Jonah Hill for Cyrus	Tina Fey for Date Night; Anne Hathaway for Love & Other Drugs; Helen Mirren for Red; Chloë Grace Moretz for Kick-Ass; Emma Stone for Easy A
Comedy Director	Comedy Screenplay
Jay Duplass and Mark Duplass for Cyrus; Will Gluck for Easy A; Adam McKay for The Other Guys; Matthew Vaughn for Kick-Ass; Edgar Wright for Scott Pilgrim vs. the World	Jay Duplass and Mark Duplass for Cyrus; Bert V. Royal for Easy A; Josh Heald, Sean Anders & John Morris for Hot Tub Time Machine; Matthew Vaughn and Jane Goldman for Kick-Ass; Lena Dunham for Tiny Furniture

=== Television ===
==== Johnny Carson Comedy Award ====
The inaugural Johnny Carson Comedy Award was presented to David Letterman by Bill Murray.

Comedy Series	Animated Comedy Series
30 Rock; Eastbound & Down; It's Always Sunny in Philadelphia; Modern Family; The Office	American Dad!; Archer; Family Guy; The Simpsons; South Park
Comedy Actor	Comedy Actress
Alec Baldwin for 30 Rock; Ty Burrell for Modern Family; Steve Carell for The Office; Tracy Morgan for 30 Rock; Danny McBride for Eastbound & Down	Tina Fey for 30 Rock; Jane Krakowski for 30 Rock; Jane Lynch for Glee; Betty White for Hot in Cleveland; Kristen Wiig for Saturday Night Live
Late Night Comedy Series	Sketch Comedy/Alternative Comedy Series
The Colbert Report; The Daily Show with Jon Stewart; Jimmy Kimmel Live!; Late Night with Jimmy Fallon; Late Show with David Letterman	Childrens Hospital; Funny or Die Presents; Saturday Night Live; Tim and Eric Awesome Show, Great Job!; Tosh.0
Stand-up Special	Comedy Writing
Bill Maher... But I'm Not Wrong; Louis C.K.: Hilarious; Intimate Moments for a Sensual Evening; Ricky Gervais: Out of England 2 - The Stand-Up Special; Whitney Cummings: Money Shot	30 Rock; Louie; Modern Family; The Office; The Simpsons
Comedy Directing	
30 Rock; Community; Modern Family; The Office; Saturday Night Live

== 2012 Comedy Awards ==
The nominees were announced on March 6, 2012.

=== Film ===
Comedy Film	Animated Comedy Film
The Artist; Bridesmaids; Crazy, Stupid, Love; Horrible Bosses; Midnight in Paris	Cars 2; Kung Fu Panda 2; Puss in Boots; Rango; Rio
Comedy Actor	Comedy Actress
Jason Bateman for Horrible Bosses; Steve Carell for Crazy, Stupid, Love; Jean Dujardin for The Artist; Zach Galifianakis for The Hangover Part II; Owen Wilson for Midnight in Paris	Jennifer Aniston for Horrible Bosses; Cameron Diaz for Bad Teacher; Melissa McCarthy for Bridesmaids; Emma Stone for Crazy, Stupid, Love; Kristen Wiig for Bridesmaids
Comedy Director	Comedy Screenplay
Woody Allen for Midnight in Paris; James Bobin for The Muppets; Paul Feig for Bridesmaids; Glenn Ficarra and John Requa for Crazy, Stupid, Love; Michel Hazanavicius for The Artist	50/50; Bridesmaids; Crazy, Stupid, Love; Horrible Bosses; Midnight in Paris

=== Television ===
==== Johnny Carson Comedy Award ====
The Johnny Carson Comedy Award was presented to Don Rickles by Robert De Niro and Jon Stewart.

Comedy Series	Animated Comedy Series
30 Rock; Curb Your Enthusiasm; Happy Endings; Modern Family; Parks and Recreation	Archer; Family Guy; The Life & Times of Tim; The Simpsons; South Park
Comedy Actor	Comedy Actress
Alec Baldwin for 30 Rock; Ty Burrell for Modern Family; Louis C.K. for Louie; Steve Carell for The Office; Larry David for Curb Your Enthusiasm	Zooey Deschanel for New Girl; Tina Fey for 30 Rock; Amy Poehler for Parks and Recreation; Kristen Wiig for Saturday Night Live; Sofía Vergara for Modern Family
Late Night Comedy Series	Sketch Comedy/Alternative Comedy Series
The Colbert Report; The Daily Show with Jon Stewart; Late Night with Jimmy Fallon; Late Show with David Letterman; Real Time with Bill Maher	Childrens Hospital; Louie; Portlandia; Saturday Night Live; Tosh.0
Comedy Writing	Comedy Directing
30 Rock; Curb Your Enthusiasm; Louie; Modern Family; Parks and Recreation; Saturday Night Live	30 Rock; Curb Your Enthusiasm; Louie; Modern Family; The Office
Comedy Special of the Year	
Louis C.K.: Live at the Beacon Theater; Norm Macdonald: Me Doing Standup; Patton Oswalt: Finest Hour; Colin Quinn Long Story Short; Daniel Tosh: Happy Thoughts

=== Other awards ===
==== Comedy Icon Award ====
The Stand-Up Icon Award was presented to Robin Williams by Patton Oswalt.

==== Club Comic ====
- Ted Alexandro
- Hannibal Buress
- Pete Holmes
- Anthony Jeselnik
- Moshe Kasher
- John Mulaney
- Kumail Nanjiani
- Chelsea Peretti
- Amy Schumer
- Rory Scovel

==== Stand-Up Tour ====
- Dave Attell
- Lewis Black
- Louis C.K.
- Kevin Hart
- Jerry Seinfeld

==== Viewer's Choice ====
- Zooey Deschanel
- Josh Gad
- Donald Glover
- Melissa McCarthy
- Jason Sudeikis

==== Best Viral Original ====
- "Songify This - Winning - A Song by Charlie Sheen"
