= Paul Frisbie =

American standup comedian, author and songwriter

Paul Frisbie is an American standup comedian, author and songwriter. Although he is primarily a monologist, he is best known for his songs, which have been popularized through comedy radio programming like The Bob & Tom Show. Favorites include "Thank God You Broke My Heart", "Christmas Letter", and "Gaining One Pound Per Day".

== Biography ==
Frisbie started performing in the 1980s, when he was the owner of the Alley Cat Saloon in Champaign, Illinois, a focal point of the old live music scene at the University of Illinois campus. After selling his nightclub and returning to Chicago, he worked his way up the comedy ladder in clubs like Zanies and the original Chicago Improv. He is often compared to Rodney Dangerfield of which he has said, "I hope they're talking about the energy, not physical appearance -- I happen to think that I look like Robert Redford."

== Discography ==
Wicked Fun, CD Release, 2000
Hell Gigs and Hack Lines, CD Release, 2005
Bits and Pieces, DVD Release, 2008

== Published works ==
The Chicago River From Your Window published 2002
