= Etta May =

American comedian

- Born: Brenda Ferrari; United States

Comedy career
- Medium: Stand-up comedy
- Subjects: Everyday life, Culture of the Southern United States

Etta May is an American comedy character, created by actress Brenda Ferrari of Des Moines, Iowa. She was the winner of the American Comedy Awards Stand-Up Comic of the Year, and has appeared on MTV, Oprah, Comic Strip Live, and as a guest commentator on CBS Sunday Morning.

In 2007, she performed at sold out theaters on tour with Etta May and the Southern Fried Chicks.
