= Tommy Pope =

American comedian and actor

- Born: November 21, 1979 (age 46); Philadelphia, Pennsylvania, U.S.
- Notable work: Real Househusbands of Philadelphia, Delco Proper, Tires

Comedy career
- Medium: Stand-up, sketch, television
- Genres: Observational comedy, sketch comedy

Tommy Pope (né Papa; born November 21, 1979) is an American stand-up comedian, writer, and actor.

He is best known for his digital content as part of the sketch comedy troupes BirdText and Deer Prom, who were responsible for the web series Real Househusbands of Philadelphia, Comedy Central web series Delco Proper, and Netflix's Tires.

== Early life ==
Born in Philadelphia, Pennsylvania, Pope grew up in Drexel Hill, a neighborhood located 8 miles west of Center City, Philadelphia. He is the youngest of three boys. His father is mixed Italian and Irish descent (50/50), his mother is of Irish descent.

Pope attended Monsignor Bonner High School and is a graduate of Drexel University, where he studied information science, technology and engineering. After graduation, Pope worked in information technology support and then in advertising before pursuing a career in comedy.

== Career ==
Pope started comedy at the age of 28 at the suggestion of one of his brothers. He adopted the surname "Pope" as his stage name to avoid being confused with comedian Tom Papa.

In 2011, he won "Philly's Phunniest", a yearly comedy contest held by Helium Comedy Club, and was featured in the "New Faces" showcase at the Just for Laughs festival in Montreal the following year. He made his television debut on AXS TV's stand up series Gotham Comedy Live in 2013 and was a contestant in the eighth season of NBC's Last Comic Standing in 2014.

Pope first met frequent collaborator, John McKeever (co-creator and director of the web series Gilly & Keeves with comedian Shane Gillis) in 2008 while performing stand-up comedy at The Raven Lounge in Philadelphia. Pope, McKeever and Luke Cunningham (writer for The Tonight Show Starring Jimmy Fallon) formed comedy sketch group BirdText from 2010 to 2014. The group performed a monthly show at Helium Comedy Club and also produced digital content which has been featured on VH1, NPR's Fresh Air, Philadelphia Magazine and National Lampoon. They became known for their video series Real Househusbands of Philadelphia, a spoof of the Real Housewives franchise. In 2013, Pope appeared in a sketch featuring Steve Martin on The Tonight Show Starring Jimmy Fallon. Cunningham was writing for the show at the time.

In 2014, Pope and McKeever created another comedy sketch group, Deer Prom, that performed regularly at Carolines on Broadway and they performed at the New York Comedy Festival in 2014. As Deer Prom, Pope, McKeever and comedian Tim Butterly created the comedy series Delco Proper for Comedy Central. The series revolves around the lives of three best friends from Philadelphia and Delaware County and the network initially posted a single episode to their website in 2015, followed by three more episodes in 2016. In 2017, Comedy Central announced that it had ordered Delco Proper for their 2017–2018 season, however the show did not make it to air on their television network.

Pope was featured in an episode of the Comedy Central storytelling series, This Is Not Happening, in 2018.

In 2021, Pope and fellow comedian Chris O'Connor, who share a New York apartment, started the podcast Stuff Island. The podcast features conversations with a different comedian each episode, recorded from their living room.
