= Jason Love (comedian) =

American comedian

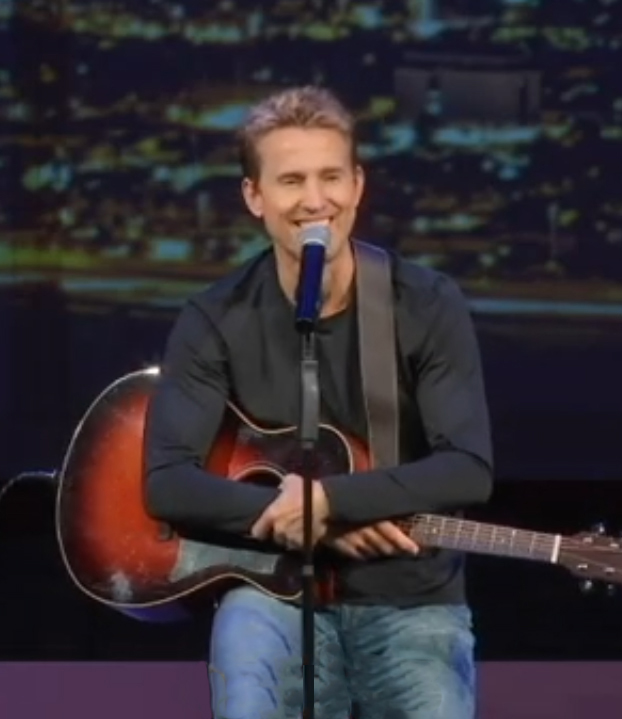
- Jason Love at Fox Theater in Tucson, Arizona. March 2020.

Jason Love is a standup comedian from Thousand Oaks, California.

== Career ==
Love began his career in 2003 by syndicating Snapshots, a daily cartoon published by newspapers such as The Denver Post and Tampa Bay Times. From 2003 to 2007, Love worked as a humor columnist for the Ventura County Star.

Since 2008, Love has worked as a standup comedian, performing more than 200 times per year for comedy clubs, corporations, and cruise ships, and private parties.

Jason runs a non-profit organization, Love & Laughter, that brings free standup comedy shows to cancer support locations in the country.

In 2017, he recorded a Dry Bar Comedy special, Jokes On Me.

His second Moron was produced by 800 Pound Gorilla and has been broadcast on Pandora and Sirius XM.

Since the COVID-19 pandemic, Love has produced a virtual show, Live Comedy in Your Living Room. It features professional comics performing live from around the US.

He is represented by Levity Entertainment Group.

== Standup comedy ==
Known for his “clean style and quirky spirit", Jason Love headlines at comedy clubs and cruise ships while producing his own shows at venues such as the San Diego County Fair and performing arts centers. The VC Reporter describes Jason as a "lean, clean, jokin’ machine."

=== Television ===
- Luck (HBO); played a horse race expert
- Last Comic Standing (NBC)
- Laughs on Fox
- Today's Riff (TBS)
- Standup and Deliver on Nuvo TV
- One-hour special for Dry Bar Comedy
- Host of the video series “Canned” produced by Studio 805.
- Hosted for the Ventura County Star a number of humorous videos produced by Anthony Plascencia.

=== Radio ===
- Appeared on The Bob & Tom Show radio program
- Podcast Labor of Love produced by Sideshow Network
- Sirius XM channel Laughs USA

=== Cruise lines ===
- Royal Caribbean
- Celebrity
- Norwegian
- Carnival
- Holland America
- Princess

=== Casinos and clubs ===
- Brad Garrett's
- The Improv
- Laugh Factory
- Stardome
- Caroline's on Broadway
- Flappers
- Punchline
- Zanies
- Edgewater
- Comedy Store
- Balboa Theatre
- Hermosa Comedy & Magic
- Standup Live
- Parlor Live

=== Internet ===
- Podcast, Labor of Love
- Livestream series Jason Love & Friends
- Pandora Radio

=== Armed Forces Entertainment ===
- Performed in Afghanistan for the troops

== Discography ==
Metro Man

Jokes On Me

== Publications ==
Snapshots: The Big Picture (ISBN 978-1419685163)

So It Goes: Stories for People Who Laugh (ISBN 978-1439260999)

Quotes from Jason Love's standup act can be found in Reader's Digest as well as the books Comedy Thesaurus and Squeaky Clean Comedy.

== Awards ==
2006: Second Place in Humor for circulations over 100K from The National Society of Newspaper Columnists.

Love was a finalist at the Cabo Comedy Festival and at the World Series of Comedy in Vegas.
