= List of Jewish American entertainers =

This is a list of notable Jewish American entertainers. For other Jewish Americans, see Lists of American Jews.

== Actors (film and TV) & artists ==
Organized by birth decade

=== 2000s ===
- Odessa Adlon (born 2000), actress
- Asher Angel (born 2002), actor and singer
- Jared Belushi (born 2002), actor
- Emma Berman (born 2008), actress
- Eitan Bernath (born 2002), television personality (The Drew Barrymore Show)
- Bhad Bhabie (born 2003), rapper
- Andrew Barth Feldman (born 2002), actor
- Sombr (born 2005), singer
- Aidan Gallagher (born 2003), actor (The Umbrella Academy)
- Alex Garfin (born 2003), actor
- Jack Dylan Grazer (born 2003), actor
- Ariana Greenblatt (born 2007), actress
- Damian Hurley (born. 2002), actor
- BLP Kosher (born Benjamin Landy Pavlon, 2000), rapper
- Julia Lester (born 2000), actress (High School Musical: The Musical: The Series)
- Jaren Lewison (born 2000), actor (Never Have I Ever)
- Milo Manheim (born 2001), actor
- David Mazouz (born 2001), actor
- Raymond Ochoa (born 2001), actor
- Lumi Pollack (born 2009), actress
- Joshua Rush (born 2001), actor (Andi Mack)
- Sadie Sandler (born 2006), actress
- Sunny Sandler (born 2008), actress
- Noah Schnapp (born 2004), actor (Stranger Things)

=== 1990s ===
- Gideon Adlon (born 1997), actress
- Gracie Abrams (born 1999), singer
- Ariela Barer (born 1997), actress
- Madison Beer (born 1999), singer
- Jamison Belushi (born 1999), actress and singer
- Sofia Black-D'Elia (born 1991), actress
- Dawn M. Bennett (born 1992), voice actress (Jewish grandfather)
- Jonah Bobo (born 1997), film actor (Around the Bend, Zathura)
- Cameron Boyce (1999–2019), actor (Jessie)
- Max Burkholder (born 1997), actor
- Doja Cat (born 1995), American rapper, singer-songwriter
- Pauline Chalamet (born 1992), actress
- Timothée Chalamet (born 1995), actor
- Emory Cohen (born 1990), actor
- David Corenswet (born 1993) film/TV actor (Jewish father)
- Flora Cross (born 1993), film actress (Bee Season)
- Spencer Daniels (born 1992), actor
- Zoey Deutch (born 1994), actress
- Beanie Feldstein (born 1993), actress (Lady Bird, Booksmart)
- Isabelle Fuhrman (born 1997), actress
- Julia Garner (born 1994), actress
- Skyler Gisondo (born 1996), actor (Vacation, Santa Clarita Diet)
- Zachary Gordon (born 1998), film actor (Diary of a Wimpy Kid)
- Alexander Gould (born 1994), film/TV actor (Finding Nemo)
- Teo Halm (born 1999), actor
- Carter Jenkins (born 1991), film/TV actor
- Noah Kahan (born 1997), singer
- Hunter King (born 1993), actress, (The Young and the Restless)
- Kira Kosarin (born 1997), actress (The Thundermans)
- Logan Lerman (born 1992), film/TV actor (Percy Jackson & the Olympians: The Lightning Thief)
- Jonathan Lipnicki (born 1990), film actor (Jerry Maguire, Like Mike)
- Mikey Madison (born 1999), actress
- James Maslow (born 1990), actor/singer
- Blake Michael (born 1996), actor
- Ezra Miller (born 1992), film actor
- Mac Miller (1992–2018), American rapper, singer-songwriter, and record producer
- Ian Nelson (born 1995), actor
- Nicola Peltz (born 1995), actress
- Ben Platt (born 1993), Broadway star, actor, singer-songwriter (Dear Evan Hansen, The Politician)
- Ryan Potter (born 1995), actor
- Charlie Puth (born 1991), singer-songwriter
- Nathalia Ramos (born 1992), Spanish-born American actress (Bratz: The Movie)
- Sarah Ramos (born 1991), TV actress (American Dreams)
- Ben Rosenfield (born c. 1992/93), actor
- Ben Levi Ross (born 1998), actor
- Odeya Rush (born 1997), Israeli-born American
- Daryl Sabara (born 1992), actor (Spy Kids, Keeping Up with the Steins, Halloween)
- Halston Sage (born 1993), actress
- Larry Saperstein (born 1998), actor (High School Musical: The Musical: The Series)
- Julian Shapiro-Barnum (born 1999), actor
- Eden Sher (born 1991), actress, The Middle TV series
- Adiel Stein (born 1991), film actor (Stolen Summer)
- Hailee Steinfeld (born 1996) film/TV actress, singer (Jewish father)

=== 1980s ===
- Dianna Agron (born 1986), actress and singer
- Eddie Kaye Thomas (born Edward Kovelsky; 1980), actor (American Pie, Scorpion)
- Jonathan Ahdout (born 1989), actor (House of Sand and Fog, 24)
- Jack Antonoff (born 1984), singer-songwriter, record producer (Member of the bands FUN, Bleachers & Steel Train)
- Skylar Astin (born Skylar Astin Lipstein; 1987), actor and singer
- Justin Baldoni (born 1984), actor (Everwood)
- David "Lil Dicky" Andrew Burd (born 1988), rapper and comedian
- Rachel Bloom (born 1987), actress, singer and comedy writer (Crazy Ex-Girlfriend)
- Alison Brie (born 1982), actress (Community, The LEGO Movie and GLOW)
- Amanda Bynes (born 1986), film actress and former show host on Nickelodeon (She's the Man)
- Lizzy Caplan (born 1982), film/TV actress (Mean Girls, Cloverfield)
- Chanel West Coast (born 1988), TV personality, rapper, singer
- Lauren Cohan (born 1982), film/television actress (Supernatural)
- Matt Cohen (born 1982), film/TV actor
- Alexa Davalos (born 1982), actress
- Dave Davis (born 1989), actor
- John Francis Daley (born 1985), actor/director (Freaks and Geeks)
- Kat Dennings (born 1986), film/TV actress
- Lucy DeVito (born 1983), actress (Little Demon)
- Daveed Diggs (born 1982), actor, rapper
- Lena Dunham (born 1986), actress/writer/director (Girls)
- Zac Efron (born 1987), film/TV actor (Efron's paternal grandfather was Jewish, and Efron has referred to himself as Jewish)
- Alden Ehrenreich (born 1989), actor
- Jesse Eisenberg (born 1983), film actor (The Squid and the Whale)
- Ben Foster (born 1980), actor
- Jon Foster (born 1984), film/TV actor (Stay Alive)
- Shayna Fox (born 1984), voice actress
- Dave Franco (born 1985), actor
- Seth Gabel (born 1981), American actor
- Andrew Garfield (born 1983), British and American actor
- Rafi Gavron (born 1989), British and American actor
- Gideon Glick (born 1988), actor
- Joseph Gordon-Levitt (born 1981), film/TV actor
- Max Greenfield (born 1980), film/TV actor
- Jake Gyllenhaal (born 1980), film actor (Brokeback Mountain)
- Armie Hammer (born 1986), actor (has identified himself as "half Jewish")
- Erin Heatherton (born 1989), model and actress
- Simon Helberg (born 1980), TV actor and comedian (The Big Bang Theory)
- Jonah Hill (born 1983), film actor
- Scarlett Johansson (born 1984), film actress (Jewish mother)
- Ariana Jollee (born 1982), pornographic actress and pornographic film director
- Jeremy Jordan (born 1984), stage/musical film/television actor (Jewish mother)
- Lucian Kahn (born 1982), musician (Schmekel)
- Avriel Kaplan (born 1989), musician/songwriter (vocal bassist of a cappella group Pentatonix, founder of musical group Avriel & the Sequoias)
- Dan Katz (born 1985), podcaster with Barstool Sports (Pardon My Take)
- Jonathan Keltz (born 1988), Canadian and American actor
- Ethan Klein (born 1985), internet personality
- Zoe Kravitz (born 1988), actress, model and singer
- Mila Kunis (born 1983), TV actress (That '70s Show, Family Guy)
- Adam Lamberg (born 1984), actor (Lizzie McGuire)
- Adam Lambert (born 1982), singer and runner-up on American Idol
- Shia LaBeouf (born 1986), TV/film actor (Even Stevens, Holes, Disturbia, Transformers)
- Samm Levine (born 1982), film/TV actor
- Margarita Levieva (born 1980), actress and professional gymnast
- Alex D. Linz (born 1989), actor (Home Alone 3, Max Keeble's Big Move)
- Lauren London (born 1984), actress (ATL)
- Jessica Manley (born 1985), actress (Anne Frank: The Whole Story)
- Eli Marienthal (born 1986), film actor (Confessions of a Teenage Drama Queen)
- Scott Mechlowicz (born 1981), film actor (EuroTrip, Mean Creek)
- Bryce Papenbrook (born 1986), voice actor (Digimon series, Sword Art Online, Attack on Titan)
- Sara Paxton (born 1988), actress (Darcy's Wild Life, Aquamarine)
- Josh Peck (born 1986), actor (Drake & Josh)
- Ashley Peldon (born 1984), film/TV actress
- Courtney Peldon (born 1981), film/TV actress
- Alisan Porter (born 1981), film and stage actress and singer
- Natalie Portman (born 1981), Israeli-born film actor (V for Vendetta)
- Laura Prepon (born 1980), film/TV actress (That '70s Show)
- Nikki Reed (born 1988), film actress/screenwriter (Thirteen)
- Emmy Rossum (born 1986), actress, singer-songwriter
- Daniela Ruah (born 1983), Portuguese-American actress
- Ben Savage (born 1980), actor
- Ben Schwartz (born 1981), actor, writer, comedian
- Jason Schwartzman (born 1980), actor and member of the band Phantom Planet
- Jason Segel (born 1980), film/TV actor
- Jamie-Lynn Sigler (born 1981), film/TV actress and singer (The Sopranos)
- Jenny Slate (born 1982), actress/comedian
- Jussie Smollett (born 1982), actor (Empire)
- Jurnee Smollett-Bell (born 1986), actress (True Blood)
- Marla Sokoloff (born 1980), film/TV actress (Big Day)
- Shoshannah Stern (born 1980), TV actress
- Lauren Storm (born 1987), TV actress (Flight 29 Down)
- Khleo Thomas (born 1989), film actor (Holes)
- Ashley Tisdale (born 1985), actress and singer (High School Musical)
- Michelle Trachtenberg (1985–2025), film/TV actress
- Joseph Trohman (born 1984), musician (Fall Out Boy)
- Raviv (Ricky) Ullman (born 1986), Israeli-born actor, teen idol (Phil of the Future)
- Anneliese van der Pol (born 1984), Dutch/American actress (That's So Raven)
- Mara Wilson (born 1987), film actress (Matilda)
- James Wolk (born 1985), actor
- Evan Rachel Wood (born 1987), film actress (Thirteen, The Upside of Anger)
- Anton Yelchin (1989–2016), Russian-born film/TV actor
- Joey Zimmerman (born 1986), film/TV actor (Halloweentown)

=== 1970s ===
- Dave Annable (born 1979), actor
- Shiri Appleby (born 1978), Israeli/American film/TV actress (Roswell)
- David Arquette (born 1971), film actor
- Eric Balfour (born 1977), actor
- Elizabeth Banks (born 1974), film actress (Invincible)
- Justin Bartha (born 1978), film actor (National Treasure, The Hangover)
- Amber Benson (born 1977), actress (Buffy the Vampire Slayer)
- Elizabeth Berkley (born 1972), TV, film, and stage actress
- Jon Bernthal (born 1976), actor
- Mayim Bialik (born 1975), actress (Blossom)
- Michael Ian Black (born Michael Ian Schwartz, 1971), actor, comedian and comedy writer
- Selma Blair (born Selma Beitner, 1972), film actress, raised w/ Jewish day school (Cruel Intentions)
- Alex Borstein (born 1971), actress, writer, and comedian
- Caprice Bourret (born 1971), fashion model and actress, often known by her first name
- Zach Braff (born 1975), film/TV actor, director, screenwriter, and producer (Scrubs, Garden State)
- Tamara Braun (born 1971), soap opera actress
- Adam Brody (born 1979), actor (The O.C.)
- Adrien Brody (born 1973), film actor (The Pianist)
- Sarah Brown (born 1975), actress
- Brooke Burke (born 1971), TV personality and model
- Scott Caan (born 1976), film actor, son of James Caan
- Josh Charles (born 1971), stage, film, and TV actor
- Emmanuelle Chriqui (born 1977), film/TV actress
- Jennifer Connelly (born 1970), film and TV actress (Requiem for a Dream)
- Eric Dane (1972–2026), actor (Grey's Anatomy)
- Erin Daniels (born Erin Cohen, 1973), actress
- Brad Delson (born 1977), guitarist for the band Linkin Park
- Dustin Diamond (1977–2021), actor (Saved by the Bell)
- Oded Fehr (born 1970), Israeli/American actor (The Mummy)
- Corey Feldman (born 1971), film actor, 1980s teen idol
- James Franco (born 1978), film actor (James Dean, Spider-Man)
- Soleil Moon Frye (born 1976), actress and director (Punky Brewster)
- Sarah Michelle Gellar (born 1977), actress, writer, director, filmmaker, comedian, singer (Buffy the Vampire Slayer)
- Goapele (born 1977), singer-songwriter
- Elon Gold (born 1970), comedian, TV actor, writer, and producer
- Ginnifer Goodwin (born 1978), film/TV actress (Big Love)
- Seth Green (born 1974), actor, writer, and TV producer
- Bryan Greenberg (born 1978), film/TV actor (Prime)
- Maggie Gyllenhaal (born 1977), Golden Globe-nominated actress
- Corey Haim (1971–2010), Canadian-born film actor
- Chelsea Handler (born 1975), actress/comedian
- Alyson Hannigan (born 1974), actress (Buffy the Vampire Slayer, Date Movie)
- Danielle Harris (born 1977), actress
- Samantha Harris (born Samantha Harris Shapiro, 1973), actress and TV presenter
- Cole Hauser (born 1975), film actor
- Jason Hervey (born 1972), actor (The Wonder Years)
- Kate Hudson (born 1979), film actress (Almost Famous, How to Lose a Guy in 10 Days)
- Oliver Hudson (born 1976), film/TV actor
- Rashida Jones (born 1976), actress, writer, model, and musician (The Office)
- Chris Kattan (born 1970), comedian (Saturday Night Live)
- Joel Kinnaman (born 1979), Swedish and American actor (Jewish mother)
- Nick Kroll (born 1978), Comedian/Actor
- Alla Korot (born 1970), Ukrainian-born actress
- Boris Kodjoe (born 1973), Austrian-born actor
- Lisa Kushell (born 1971), comedic actress (MADtv, co-host of Dinner and a Movie)
- David Krumholtz (born 1978), actor (NUMB3RS)
- Rachelle Lefevre (born 1979)
- Adam Levine (born 1979), musician (Maroon 5)
- Jenny Lewis (born 1976), musician and former child actress
- Michael Lucas (born 1972), Russian-born porn star
- Jamie Luner (born 1971), actress (Melrose Place)
- Natasha Lyonne (born Natasha Braunstein, 1979), film/TV actress (American Pie, Orange is the New Black, Russian Doll)
- Gabriel Macht (born 1972), film actor
- Matisyahu (born Matthew Paul Miller, 1979), singer and rapper
- Idina Menzel (born 1971), actress, singer-songwriter
- Marisol Nichols (born 1973), actress (Jewish biological father)
- Gwyneth Paltrow (born 1972), actress and singer
- Adam Pascal (born 1970), actor (Rent)
- Amanda Peet (born 1972), film actress
- Joaquin Phoenix (born Joaquin Rafael Bottom, 1974), film actor (Walk the Line)
- Liberty Phoenix (born Libertad Mariposa Bottom, 1976), actress
- Rain Phoenix (born Rain Joan of Arc Bottom, 1972), actress/musician
- River Phoenix (born River Jude Bottom, 1970–1993), film actor (Stand By Me)
- Summer Phoenix (born Summer Joy Bottom, 1978), actress and model
- Pink (born Alecia Moore, 1979), singer and actress
- Dave Portnoy (born 1977), founder of (Barstool Sports)
- Josh Radnor (born 1976), actor (How I Met Your Mother)
- Leah Remini (born 1970), actress (The King of Queens)
- Simon Rex (born 1974), actor and model
- Michael Rosenbaum (born 1972), film/TV actor (Smallville)
- Tracee Ellis Ross (born Tracee Joy Silberstein, 1972), actress, daughter of singer Diana Ross
- Eli Roth (born 1972), film actor, director, producer and writer
- Maya Rudolph (born 1972), actress/comedian (Saturday Night Live)
- Winona Ryder (born Winona Laura Horowitz, 1971), film actress
- Antonio Sabato Jr. (born 1972), actor and model
- Sarah Saltzberg (born 1976), Broadway theater actress
- Andy Samberg (born David Andrew Samberg, 1978), comedian; part of group The Lonely Island; Saturday Night Live
- Fred Savage (born 1976), actor and TV director (Wonder Years)
- Miriam Shor (born 1971), film/TV actress (Big Day)
- Sarah Silverman (born 1970), stand-up comedian, actress, and writer
- David Moscow (born 1974), actor (Jewish from his father side)
- Alicia Silverstone (born 1976), actress and former fashion model (Clueless, Batman and Robin)
- Ione Skye (born Ione Skye Leitch, 1971), English-born actress
- Lindsay Sloane (born Lindsay Sloane Leikin, 1977), actress
- Bahar Soomekh (born 1975), Iranian-born actress (Crash)
- Tori Spelling (born 1973), actress (Beverly Hills 90210)
- Jordana Spiro (born 1977), TV actress (My Boys)
- Corey Stoll (born 1976), actor
- Matt Stone (born 1971), animator, film director, screenwriter, actor, voice actor, and co-creator of South Park
- Danny Strong (born 1974), film/TV actor
- Tara Strong (born 1973), voice actress (My Little Pony, The Fairly OddParents)
- Jonathan Togo (born 1977), actor (CSI: Miami, Mystic River)
- Mageina Tovah (born Mageina Tovah Begtrup, 1979), actress
- Kevin Weisman (born 1970), film/TV actor
- Jennifer Westfeldt (born 1971), actress and writer (Kissing Jessica Stein)
- Marissa Jaret Winokur (born 1973), film, TV, and stage actress (Hairspray stage version)
- Noah Wyle (born 1971), film/TV actor
- Nikki Ziering (born Natalie Schiele, 1971), model and actress
- Jason Zimbler (born 1977), actor (Clarissa Explains It All)
- Ethan Zohn (born 1973), Survivor: Africa winner and actor
- Arianne Zuker (born Arianne Zuckerman, 1974), soap opera actress

=== 1960s ===
- Paula Abdul (born 1962), singer-songwriter, record producer, actress, dancer, and choreographer
- Steven Adler (born 1965), musician, songwriter, drummer (Guns N' Roses)
- Patricia Arquette (born 1968), Golden Globe-nominated actress
- Hank Azaria (born 1964), film/TV actor, director, comedian, and voice artist
- David Alan Basche (born 1968), actor
- Randall Batinkoff (born 1968), film/TV actor (For Keeps?)
- Mary Kay Bergman (1961–1999), voice actress (South Park)
- Troy Beyer (born 1964), film director, screenwriter, and actress
- Craig Bierko (born 1964), film/TV actor (Cinderella Man)
- Jack Black (born 1969), film actor and musician
- Lisa Bonet (born 1967), film/TV actress (The Cosby Show)
- Matthew Broderick (born 1962), film and stage actor (Ferris Bueller's Day Off, The Producers)
- Gabrielle Carteris (born 1961), actress (Beverly Hills 90210)
- Max Casella (born 1967), actor (Doogie Howser)
- Scott Cohen (born 1964), film/TV actor
- Mindy Cohn (born 1966), TV actress (The Facts of Life)
- David Cross (born 1964), actor/comedian
- Dean Devlin (born 1962), former actor, now producer and screenwriter
- Don Diamont (born Donald Feinberg, 1961), soap opera actor (The Young and the Restless)
- Robert Downey Jr. (born 1965), actor and musician (Iron Man)
- David Duchovny (born 1960), film/TV actor (The X-Files)
- Lisa Edelstein (born 1967), actress (House)
- Jon Favreau (born 1966), actor/director
- Joely Fisher (born 1967), actress
- Dan Futterman (born 1967), actor and screenwriter
- Nika Futterman (born 1969), actress and singer
- Jeff Garlin (born 1962), comic actor (Curb Your Enthusiasm, The Goldbergs)
- Brad Garrett (born Bradley Harold Gerstenfeld, 1960), actor and comedian
- Willie Garson (1964–2021), actor
- Gina Gershon (born 1962), film actress
- Jami Gertz (born 1965), film/TV actress
- Melissa Gilbert (born 1964), former child actress, two terms as president of Screen Actors Guild
- Judy Gold (born 1962), stand-up comedian and actress
- Bill Goldberg (born 1966), former wrestler; wrestled for both World Championship Wrestling (WCW) and World Wrestling Entertainment (WWE), film/TV actor
- Tony Goldwyn (born 1960), actor (paternal grandfather was Jewish)
- Jennifer Grey (born 1960), actress and dancer (Dirty Dancing)
- Arye Gross (born 1960), film/TV actor
- Greg Grunberg (born 1966), film/TV actor (Heroes)
- Annabelle Gurwitch (born 1961), comedic actress, hostess of TBS's Dinner and a Movie
- Jessica Hecht (born 1965), film/stage actress
- Beth Hirsch (born 1967), singer-songwriter
- Monica Horan (born 1963), TV actress (Everybody Loves Raymond)
- Helen Hunt (born 1963), actress
- Sean Kanan (born Sean Perelman, 1966), soap opera actor (General Hospital)
- Lesli Kay (born Lesli Pushkin, 1965), actress (As the World Turns); had first individual girl's bat mitzvah in West Virginia
- Heather Paige Kent (born 1969), TV actress
- Marc Kudisch (born 1966), stage actor
- Lenny Kravitz (born 1964), singer-songwriter
- Lisa Kudrow (born 1963), actress (Friends)
- Juliet Landau (born 1965), actress (Ed Wood), daughter of Martin Landau and Barbara Bain
- John Lehr (born 1967), actor/comedian (10 Items or Less)
- Jennifer Jason Leigh (born Jennifer Lee Morrow, 1962), Hollywood film actress (Fast Times at Ridgemont High)
- Julia Louis-Dreyfus (born 1961), actress (Seinfeld)
- Joshua Malina (born 1966), film and stage actor
- Camryn Manheim (born 1961), actress (The Practice)
- Cindy Margolis (born 1965), actress/model; in 2000 Guinness Book of World Records as the "most downloaded" person in 1999
- Julianna Margulies (born 1966), film/TV actress (ER)
- Marc Maron (born 1963), comedian, film/TV actor
- Brett Marx (born 1964), actor (The Bad News Bears); great nephew of the Marx Brothers
- Marlee Matlin (born 1965), actress (Children of a Lesser God)
- Debra Messing (born 1968), actress (Will & Grace)
- Dina Meyer (born 1968), film/TV actress (Saw films)
- Ari Meyers (born 1969), actress (Kate & Allie)
- Rob Morrow (born 1962), actor (Northern Exposure, Numb3rs)
- Sarah Jessica Parker (born 1965), Golden Globe, Emmy-winning actress
- Sean Penn (born 1960), film actor (Fast Times at Ridgemont High, Mystic River, Dead Man Walking, Milk)
- Jeremy Piven (born 1965), actor (Entourage)
- Rain Pryor (born 1969), actress and comedian, daughter of Richard Pryor
- Ted Raimi (born 1965), actor, brother of Spider-Man director Sam Raimi
- David Bryan (Born 1962), born David Rashbaum, musician and songwriter
- Adam Rich (born 1968), child actor (Eight is Enough)
- Paul Rudd (born 1969), actor and screenwriter
- Adam Sandler (born 1966), actor, stand-up comedian, screenwriter, producer, and musician
- Rebecca Schaeffer (1967–1989), actress and model (My Sister Sam)
- Rob Schneider (born 1963), actor, comedian, and screenwriter
- Bitty Schram (born 1968), Golden Globe-nominated actress
- Liev Schreiber (born 1967), Tony Award-winning actor
- Scott Schwartz (born 1968), child actor (A Christmas Story and The Toy)
- David Schwimmer (born 1966), Emmy-nominated actor and director (Friends)
- Sam Seder (born 1966), actor, comedian, writer, producer, director
- Kyra Sedgwick (born 1965), Emmy-nominated actress
- Ally Sheedy (born 1962), screen and stage actress ("Brat Pack" films The Breakfast Club and St. Elmo's Fire)
- Jonathan Silverman (born 1966), film/TV actor
- Helen Slater (born 1963), film actress and singer-songwriter (title role in Supergirl)
- Rena Sofer (born 1968), actress
- Fisher Stevens (born Stephen Fisher, 1963), actor (Succession)
- Jon Stewart (born Jonathan Stuart Leibowitz, 1962), stand-up comedian, actor, author; host, head writer, and producer of The Daily Show
- Ben Stiller (born 1965), Emmy Award-winning comedian, actor, and film director
- Lars Ulrich (born 1963), Danish-born Metallica drummer
- Michael Vartan (born 1968), French-born film/TV actor (Monster-in-Law)
- Steven Weber (born 1961), film/TV actor (Wings)
- Scott Wolf (born 1968), actor (Party of Five)
- Ian Ziering (born 1964), actor (Beverly Hills 90210)

=== 1950s ===
- Caroline Aaron (born 1957), actress and producer
- Jason Alexander (born Jay Greenspan, 1959), actor, comedian, writer, director
- Adam Arkin (born 1956), film, TV, and stage actor
- Rosanna Arquette (born 1959), actress, film director, and film producer
- Ellen Barkin (born 1954), actress
- Roseanne Barr (born 1952), actress, comedian, writer and television producer (Roseanne)
- Robin Beck (born 1954), singer-songwriter, record producer
- Robby Benson (born Robin David Segal, 1956), actor, former teen idol
- Mike Binder (born 1958), screenwriter, film director, and actor
- Kate Capshaw (born 1953), actress (Indiana Jones)
- Jamie Lee Curtis (born 1958), Golden Globe-winning film actress, writer of books for children
- Fran Drescher (born 1957), actor, producer, writer, comedian
- Danny Elfman (born 1953), musician, composer
- Wayne Federman (born 1959), comedian, actor, author (Maravich)
- Tovah Feldshuh (born 1952), actress, singer, and playwright
- Harvey Fierstein (born 1954), actor, author, and singer
- Deb Filler (born 1954), actress, comic, singer and writer
- Carrie Fisher (1956–2016), film actress, novelist (Star Wars)
- Al Franken (born 1951), comedian, actor, author, radio host, and U.S. Senator
- Jeff Goldblum (born 1952), film actor
- Steve Guttenberg (born 1958), actor
- Mary Hart (born 1950), actress and TV personality (Entertainment Tonight)
- Amy Irving (born 1953), actress
- Toni Kalem (born 1956), film/TV actress, screenwriter, and director
- Carol Kane (born 1952), actress
- Julie Kavner (born 1950), film/TV actress (voice of Marge on The Simpsons)
- Richard Kind (born 1956), actor
- John Landis (born 1950), actor, director, writer, and producer
- Carol Leifer (born 1956), comedian and actress
- Joan Lunden (born Joan Blunden, 1950), broadcaster (Good Morning America)
- Melanie Mayron (born 1952), actress and director (Thirtysomething)
- Larry Miller (born 1953), stand-up comedian, actor
- Don Most (born 1953), actor (Happy Days)
- Judd Nelson (born 1959), actor and screenwriter (The Breakfast Club, Billionaire Boys Club)
- Bebe Neuwirth (born 1958), theater, TV, and film actress
- Laraine Newman (born 1952), comedian and actress
- Ken Olin (born 1954), actor, director and producer
- Mandy Patinkin (born 1952), actor of stage and screen, and singer/interpreter of Yiddish songs
- Lorna Patterson (born 1956), film, stage and TV actress
- Scott Patterson (born 1958), actor (Gilmore Girls)
- David Paymer (born 1954), character actor
- Ron Perlman (born 1950), film/TV actor (Hellboy)
- Kevin Pollak (born 1957), actor, impressionist, and comedian
- Paul Reiser (born 1957), actor, author, and stand-up comedian (Mad About You)
- Paul Reubens (born Paul Rubenfeld, 1952–2023), aka Peewee Herman
- Alan Rosenberg (born 1950), actor, 24th president of the Screen Actors Guild
- David Lee Roth (born 1954), singer/musician
- Katey Sagal (born 1954), actress, singer, and writer (Married... with Children)
- Bob Saget (1956–2022), actor, stand-up comedian, and game show host
- Richard Schiff (born 1955), actor (The West Wing)
- Steven Seagal (born 1952), actor, screenwriter, producer, martial artist, and musician
- Jerry Seinfeld (born 1954), comedian, actor, and writer (Seinfeld)
- Jane Seymour (born Joyce Frankenberg, 1951), English-born film/TV actress
- Wendie Jo Sperber (1958–2005), TV/movie actress
- Paul Stanley (born 1952), guitarist for KISS
- Howard Stern (born 1954), radio/TV personality, media mogul, humorist, actor, and author
- Stephen Tobolowsky (born 1951), actor
- Robert Trebor (born Robert Schenkman, 1953), actor (Hercules, Xena)
- Debra Winger (born 1955), actress
- Leslie Hoffman (born 1955), actress-stuntwoman
- Mare Winningham (born 1959), film/TV actress
- David Wohl (born 1953), actor

=== 1940s ===
- Bob Balaban (born 1945), actor and director
- Richard Belzer (1944–2023), stand-up comedian, writer, and actor
- Daniel Benzali (born 1946), actor, singer
- Raye Birk (born 1943), actor
- Lewis Black (born 1948), stand-up comedian and actor
- Albert Brooks (born Albert Lawrence Einstein, 1947), stand-up comedian, director, screenwriter, actor
- James Caan (1940–2022), film, stage, and TV actor (The Godfather)
- Nell Carter (1948–2003), singer and film, stage, and TV actress
- Peter Coyote (born Rachmil Pinchus Ben Mosha Cohon, 1941), actor and author
- Billy Crystal (born 1948), actor (Soap, Throw Momma from the Train, When Harry Met Sally..., City Slickers, Analyze This)
- Larry David (born 1947), Emmy-winning writer, director, comedian, actor, producer, co-creator of Seinfeld, and creator of Curb Your Enthusiasm
- Richard Dreyfuss (born 1947), actor (The Goodbye Girl)
- Bob Dylan (born Robert Allen Zimmerman, 1941), singer-songwriter, author, musician, and poet, also appeared in several films
- Bob Einstein (1942–2019), writer and comedian known as Super Dave
- Richard Elfman (born 1949), film director, writer, and actor
- Donald Fagen (born 1948), musician, singer-songwriter, cultural critic, author, columnist, writer, and co-founder of the famous jazz-rock duo Steely Dan
- Peter Friedman (born 1949), actor (Succession)
- Harrison Ford (born 1942), actor
- Bonnie Franklin (1944–2013), actress
- Art Garfunkel (born 1941), singer-songwriter
- Paul Michael Glaser (born 1943), actor (Starsky & Hutch)
- Scott Glenn (born 1941), actor
- Christopher Guest (born 1948), comedian, screenwriter, composer, musician, film director, actor, and Spinal Tap member
- Goldie Hawn (born 1945), film actress, director, and producer
- Dan Hedaya (born 1940), character actor
- Sandy Helberg (born 1949), actor
- Barbara Hershey (born Barbara Lynn Herzstein, 1948), actress
- Ricky Jay (born Richard Jay Potash, 1946–2018), professional sleight-of-hand artist, actor, and author
- Billy Joel (born 1949), singer-songwriter, and musician
- Madeline Kahn (1942–1999), actress of film, TV, and theater
- Gabe Kaplan (born 1945), actor, comedian, and professional poker player
- Andy Kaufman (1949–1984), comedian (Taxi); devout Jewish parents
- Judy Kaye (born 1948), singer and actress
- Lainie Kazan (born Lanie Levine, 1940), actress and singer
- Robert Klein (born 1942), stand-up comedian and occasional actor
- Kevin Kline (born 1947), stage and film actor
- Richard Kline (born 1944), actor and TV director
- Sherry Lansing (born 1944), former CEO of Paramount Studios and actress
- Vicki Lawrence (born 1949), actress, comedian, and singer.
- Michael Lembeck (born 1948), actor and director
- Richard Lewis (1947-2024), comedian and actor
- Judith Light (born 1949), actress (Who's the Boss?)
- Peggy Lipton (1947-2019), TV actress and socialite (The Mod Squad)
- Stephen Macht (born 1942), actor
- Janet Margolin (1943–1993), actress
- Richard Masur (born 1948), actor
- Bette Midler (born 1945), singer, actress, and comedian
- David Proval (born 1942), actor (The Sopranos)
- Gilda Radner (1946–1989), comedian and actress (Saturday Night Live)
- Harold Ramis (1944–2014), director, actor, writer, and producer
- Lou Reed (1942–2013), musician, singer-songwriter
- Rob Reiner (1947–2025), actor, director, producer, writer
- Peter Riegert (born 1947), film/TV actor
- Jill St. John (born 1940), actress
- Garry Shandling (1949–2016), comedian and actor
- Wallace Shawn (born 1943), actor and writer
- Harry Shearer (born 1943), actor, comedian, writer, and radio host
- Paul Simon (born 1941), singer-songwriter
- Gene Simmons (born Chaim Witz, 1949), Israeli-born actor and guitarist for KISS
- Brent Spiner (born 1949), actor (Star Trek: The Next Generation)
- Sylvester Stallone (born 1946), film actor, director, producer, and screenwriter (Rocky), maternally Jewish
- Marcia Strassman (1948–2014), film/TV actress (Honey, I Shrunk the Kids, Honey, I Blew Up the Kid)
- Barbra Streisand (born 1942), two-time Academy Award-winning singer, actress, director, writer and producer
- Jeffrey Tambor (born 1944), film/TV actor (Hellboy, Arrested Development)
- Jessica Walter (1941–2021), film/TV actress (Arrested Development)
- Zoë Wanamaker (born 1949), American-born English actress
- Lesley Ann Warren (born 1946), stage, film, and TV actress
- Victor Raider-Wexler (born 1943), actor
- Anson Williams (born Anson William Heimlick, 1949), actor (Happy Days)
- Henry Winkler (born 1945), actor, director, producer, and author (Happy Days)

=== 1930s ===
- Woody Allen (born Allan Stewart Konigsberg, 1935), film director, writer, actor, and stand-up comedian
- Alan Arkin (1934–2023), film actor, director
- Barbara Barrie (1931–2026), actress and author of children's books
- Richard Benjamin (born 1938), actor and film director
- Dyan Cannon (born Samille Diane Friesen, 1937), film/TV actress, editor, producer, and director
- Eddie Carmel (1936–1972), entertainer known as "The Jewish Giant"
- Roger C. Carmel (1932–1986), actor
- Jerry Douglas (born Gerald Rubenstein, 1932–2021), TV actress (The Young and the Restless)
- Herb Edelman (1933–1996), actor
- Elliott Gould (born Elliot Goldstein, 1938), film/TV actor
- Andre Gregory (born 1934), actor-writer-director, known for My Dinner with Andre
- Charles Grodin (1935–2021), actor and cable talk show host
- Judd Hirsch (born 1935), actor (Taxi, NUMB3RS)
- Dustin Hoffman (born 1937), two-time-Oscar-winning actor
- Tony Jay (1933–2006), English/American actor
- Harvey Keitel (born 1939), actor
- Larry King (1933–2021), television host
- Walter Koenig (1936–2026), actor, writer, teacher, and director (appeared in original Star Trek)
- Yaphet Kotto (1939–2021), African-American actor; son of Cameroonian Crown Prince (role in Alien)
- Michael Landon (born Eugene Maurice Orowitz, 1936–1991), actor, producer, and director
- Louise Lasser (born 1939), stage/film/TV actress (Mary Hartman, Mary Hartman)
- Piper Laurie (born Rosetta Jacobs, 1932–2023), actress
- Linda Lavin (1937-2024), stage, film, and TV actress
- Steve Lawrence (born Sidney Liebowitz, 1935–2024), singer and actor (The Carol Burnett Show)
- Shari Lewis (born Sonia Phyllis Hurwitz, 1933–1998), ventriloquist, puppeteer, and children's TV show host
- Hal Linden (born Harold Lipshitz, 1931), actor and TV director (Barney Miller)
- Tina Louise (born 1934), model, singer, and film/TV actress
- Mark Margolis (1939-2023), actor
- Linda Marsh (born 1939), actress
- Jackie Mason (born Yacov Moshe Maza, 1928–2021), stand-up comedian/actor
- Paul Mazursky (1930–2014), film director and actor
- Art Metrano (1936–2021), actor
- Shelley Morrison (1936-2019) American actress to Jewish-Sephardic parents.
- Barry Newman (1938–2023), actor
- Leonard Nimoy (1931–2015), film director, actor; played Spock on Star Trek
- Suzanne Pleshette (1937–2008), actress (The Bob Newhart Show)
- Ron Rifkin (born 1939), actor, director
- Joan Rivers (born Joan Alexandra Molinsky Sanger Rosenberg, 1933–2014), comedian, actress, talk show host
- George Segal (1934–2021), film and stage actor
- Susan Strasberg (1938–1999), actress (In Praise of Older Women)
- Dame Elizabeth Taylor (1932–2011), Oscar-winning English/American film actress and sex symbol
- Gene Wilder (born Jerome Silberman, 1933–2016), actor and comedian

=== 1920s ===
- Jerry Adler (1929–2025), actor, theatrical producer, and director
- Marty Allen (1922–2018), stand-up comedian and actor
- Ed Ames (born Edmund Dantes Urick, 1927-2023), singer and actor
- Beatrice Arthur (born Bernice Frankel, 1922–2009), actress
- Ed Asner (1929–2021), actor
- Lauren Bacall (born Betty Joan Perske, 1924–2014), film and stage actress
- Julian Beck (1925–1985), actor, director, poet, and painter
- Harry Belafonte (1927–2023), singer, actor, and activist
- Shelley Berman (1926–2017), comedian, writer, teacher, and actor
- Herschel Bernardi (1923–1986), film, Broadway, and TV actor
- Theodore Bikel (1924–2015), character actor, folk singer, and musician
- Larry Blyden (1925–1975), actor
- Tom Bosley (1927–2010), film/TV actor (Happy Days)
- Mel Brooks (born Melvin Kaminsky, 1926), director, writer, actor, and stand-up comedian
- Lenny Bruce (born Leonard Schneider, 1925–1966), stand-up comedian, writer, social critic, satirist
- Susan Cabot (1927–1986), actress
- Sid Caesar (1922–2014), comic actor and writer
- Robert Clary (born Robert Max Widerman, 1926–2022), French-born actor, published author, and lecturer
- Tony Curtis (born Bernard Schwartz, 1925–2010), film actor
- Bill Dana (1924–2017), comedian, actor, and screenwriter
- Rodney Dangerfield (born Jacob Cohen, 1921–2004), comedian and actor
- Sammy Davis Jr. (1925–1990) (converted to Judaism), entertainer, member of the "Rat Pack"
- Peter Falk (1927–2011), actor
- Fyvush Finkel (1922–2016), actor
- Eddie Fisher (1928–2010), singer; father of Carrie Fisher
- Lee Grant (born Lyova Haskell Rosenthal, 1927), theater, film, and TV actress, and film director
- Buddy Hackett (born Leonard Hacker, 1924–2003), stand-up comedian, writer, actor, and producer
- Monty Hall (born Monte Halperin, 1921–2017), Canadian-born actor, singer, and sportscaster (Let's Make a Deal)
- Estelle Harris (born Estelle Nussbaum, 1928–2022), actress (Seinfeld)
- Laurence Harvey (born Zvi Mosheh Skikne, 1928–1973), Lithuanian-born actor; British and American films
- Steven Hill (born Solomon Krakovsky, 1922–2016), film/TV actor
- Judy Holliday (born Judith Tuvim, 1921–1965), actress, singer
- Werner Klemperer (1920–2000), comedic actor
- Jack Klugman (1922–2012), actor
- Harvey Korman (1927–2008), actor
- Stanley Kubrick (1928–1999), filmmaker, photographer
- Harvey Lembeck (1923–1982), comedic actor
- Martin Landau (1928–2017), film/TV actor
- Al Lewis (born Albert Meister, 1920–2006), actor (Grandpa Munster)
- Jerry Lewis (born Joseph Levitch, 1926–2017), comedian, actor, and charity fund-raising telethons
- Bill Macy (1922–2019), actor
- Ross Martin (born Martin Rosenblatt, 1920–1981), Polish-born (Jewish family) film/TV actor (Wild Wild West)
- Walter Matthau (1920–2000), actor
- Anne Meara (1929–2015), comedian and actress, partner and wife of Jerry Stiller, converted to Judaism
- Dick Miller, (1928–2019), character actor
- Marilyn Monroe (1926–1962), actress, singer, and model, converted to Judaism.
- Vic Morrow (1929–1982), actor
- Jerry Paris (1925–1986), actor and Emmy-winning director (The Dick Van Dyke Show)
- Charlotte Rae (1926–2018), actress (The Facts of Life)
- Tony Randall (born Arthur Leonard Rosenberg, 1920–2004), comic actor
- Carl Reiner (1922–2020), actor, film director, producer, writer, and comedian
- Regina Resnik (1922–2013), opera singer and actress
- Don Rickles (1926–2017), stand-up comedian, actor; pioneer of insult comedy
- Fred Sadoff (1926–1994), actor in South Pacific
- Mort Sahl (1927–2021), stand-up comedian and actor
- Rod Serling (1924–1975), screenwriter and actor (The Twilight Zone)
- Simone Signoret (1921–1985), Academy Award-winning French actress
- Jerry Stiller (1927–2020), comedian and actor
- Mel Tormé (1925–1999), actor, musician, known as "The Velvet Fog", jazz singer-songwriter
- Marilyn Tyler (1926–2017), opera singer
- Abe Vigoda (1921–2016), film/TV actor (The Godfather)
- Shelley Winters (born Shirley Schrift, 1920–2006), two-time Academy Award-winning actress
- Estelle Getty 1923-2008 actress

=== 1910s ===
- Mason Adams (1919–2005), character actor
- Martin Balsam (1919–1996), actor; won an Academy Award for A Thousand Clowns
- John Banner (1910–1973), Austrian/American actor (Hogan's Heroes)
- Carol Bruce (born Shirley Levy, 1919–2007), band singer, Broadway star, and film and television actress
- Red Buttons (born Aaron Chwatt, 1919–2006), Academy Award-winning comedian and actor
- Jeff Chandler (born Ira Grossel, 1918-1961), film actor, singer and song writer ––
- Lee J. Cobb (born Leo Jacob, 1911–1976), Academy Award-nominated film actor
- Kirk Douglas (born Issur Danielovitch, 1916–2020), actor (Spartacus)
- Elissa Minet Fuchs (born Elise Minette Levy; 1919–2023), ballerina
- John Garfield (born Jacob Garfinkle, 1913–1952), actor
- Paulette Goddard (born Marion Levy, 1910–1990), Oscar-nominated film and theatre actress
- Kitty Carlisle Hart (born Catherine Conn, 1910–2007), singer, actress, and spokeswoman for the arts
- Danny Kaye (born David Daniel Kaminsky, 1911–1987), film actor, singer and comedian
- Hedy Lamarr (born Hedwig Kiesler, 1914–2000), actress, invented early form of spread spectrum communications technology, a key to modern wireless communication
- Marc Lawrence (born Max Goldsmith, 1910–2005), character actor
- Zero Mostel (born Samuel Mostel, 1915–1977), stage and film actor
- Jan Murray (born Murray Janofsky, 1916–2006), stand-up comedian, actor
- Luise Rainer (1910–2014), German-born American two-time Academy Award-winning film actress
- Lillian Roth (born Lillian Rutstein, 1910–1980), singer and actress, performer on Broadway
- Dinah Shore (born Frances Rose Shore, 1916–1994), singer and actress
- Sylvia Sidney (born Sophia Kosow, 1910–1999), film actress
- Phil Silvers (1911–1985), entertainer and comedy actor
- Harold J. Stone (born Harold Hochstein, 1913–2005), film/TV character actor
- Arnold Stang (1918–2009), American comic actor typically cast as a bespectacled but arrogant and loud-mouthed con artist
- Mike Wallace (born Myron Wallace, 1918–2012), journalist, briefly acted during the 1940s
- Eli Wallach (1915–2014), film, TV and stage actor
- Sam Wanamaker (1919–1993), actor and director
- Keenan Wynn (1916–1986), character actor

=== 1900s ===
- Stanley Adams (1907–1994), lyricist and songwriter
- Stella Adler (1901–1992), actress and acting teacher
- Jack Albertson (1907–1981), actor (Chico and the Man)
- Leon Askin (born Leon Aschkenasy, 1907–2005), Austrian American actor
- Milton Berle (born Milton Berlinger, 1908–2002), comedian and actor; pioneered vaudeville and stand-up comedy art forms
- Joe Besser (1907–1988), comedian (Three Stooges)
- Mel Blanc (1908–1989), voice actor and comedian, "The Man of a Thousand Voices", created voices of Bugs Bunny, Daffy Duck, Porky Pig, Tweety Bird, Wile E. Coyote, Barney Rubble
- Ben Blue (born Benjamin Bernstein, 1901–1975), Canadian American actor and comedian
- Howard Da Silva (born Howard Silverblatt, 1909–1986), film actor
- Melvyn Douglas (born Melvyn Hesselberg, 1901–1981), actor, won all three of the entertainment industry's highest awards (two Oscars, a Tony, and an Emmy)
- Larry Fine (born Louis Feinberg, 1902–1975), comedian and actor (Three Stooges)
- Joseph Green (1900–1996), Polish-American film actor and director
- John Houseman (born Jacques Haussmann, 1902–1988), actor; won an Academy Award for The Paper Chase
- Curly Howard (born Jerome Horwitz, 1903–1952), one of the Three Stooges
- Sam Levene (1905–1980), Russian/American stage and film actor
- Peter Lorre (born László Löwenstein, 1904–1964), Austria-Hungary-born American stage and screen actor (M)
- Zeppo Marx (1901–1979), member of the Marx Brothers
- Sandy Meisner (1905–1997), actor and acting coach; developed acting methodology known as the "Meisner Technique"
- Ritz Brothers (Al, Jimmy, and Harry Ritz, 1901–1965, 1904–1985, 1907–1986 respectively), Jewish comedy team
- Natalie Schafer (1900–1991), actress (Gilligan's Island)
- Lee Strasberg (born Israel Strassberg, 1901–1982), actor, director, and acting teacher in theater and film, who according to author Mel Gussow "revolutionized the art of acting"

=== 1890s ===
- Jack Benny (born Benjamin Kubelsky, 1894–1974), comedian, vaudeville performer, and radio, TV, and film actor
- Gertrude Berg (born Tilly Edelstein, 1899–1966), radio/TV actress
- Fanny Brice (born Fania Borach, 1891–1951), comedian, singer, and entertainer
- George Burns (born Nathan Birnbaum, 1896–1996), comedian and actor
- Eddie Cantor (born Israel Iskowitz, 1892–1964), comedian, singer-songwriter, actor
- Ricardo Cortez (born Jacob Krantz, 1899–1977), Austrian-born American silent film star, known as a "Latin lover" type
- Anthony Frome, (born Abraham Feinberg, 1899–1986), singer, the "Poet Prince of the Air Waves".
- Hermione Gingold (1897–1987), British-born actress
- Moe Howard (born Moses Horwitz, 1897–1975), "leader" of the Three Stooges
- Shemp Howard (born Samuel Horwitz, 1895–1955), member of the Three Stooges
- Sam Jaffe (born Shalom Jaffe, 1891–1984), Academy Award-nominated film and stage actor
- Irving Kaufman (born Isidore Kaufman, 1890–1976), singer, recording artist, and vaudeville performer
- Francis Lederer (1899–2000), Czech-born American actor
- Philip Loeb (1892–1955), stage, film, and TV actor
- Paul Lukas (1895–1971), Hungarian American film actor
- Groucho Marx (born Julius Marx, 1890–1977), comedian, working both with his siblings, the Marx Brothers, and on his own
- Gummo Marx (born Milton Marx, 1893–1977), one of the Marx Brothers
- Paul Muni (born Meshilem Meier Weisenfreund, 1895–1967), Austrian-born American Academy Award and Tony Award-winning actor
- Carmel Myers (1899–1980), silent film actress
- Molly Picon (born Małka Opiekun, 1898–1992), actor of stage, screen, and TV
- Edward G. Robinson (born Emanuel Goldenberg, 1893–1973), stage and film actor
- Mae West (born Mary Jane West, 1893–1980), actress, playwright, screenwriter, and sex symbol

=== 1880s ===
- Broncho Billy Anderson (born Maxwell Aronson, 1880–1971), actor, writer, director, and producer; first star of the Western film genre
- Theda Bara (born Theodosia Goodman, 1885–1955), silent film actress; the first screen "vamp"
- Douglas Fairbanks (born Douglas Ullman, 1883–1939), actor, screenwriter, director, and producer known for his silent films
- Al Jolson (born Asa Yoelson, 1886–1950), singer and actor
- Chico Marx (born Leonard Marx, 1887–1961), one of the Marx Brothers
- Harpo Marx (born Adolph Marx, 1888–1964), one of the Marx Brothers
- Sophie Tucker (born Sonya Kalish, 1884–1966), actress, singer, and comedian
- Erich von Stroheim (1885–1957), Austrian-born American filmmaker and actor
- Louis Wolheim (1880–1931), character actor in silent films during the 1920s; also appeared on stage and in early sound films (All Quiet on the Western Front)
- Ed Wynn (born Isaiah Edwin Leopold, 1886–1966), comedian and actor

=== Pre–1880s ===
- Alla Nazimova (born Miriam Leventon, 1879–1945), theater and film actress, scriptwriter, and producer
- Boris Thomashefsky (1868–1939), Ukrainian-born American singer, actor, Yiddish theater icon
- Jacob Pavlovitch Adler (1855–1926), Russian-born American actor, Yiddish theater
- Adah Isaacs Menken (1835–1868), actress, dancer, painter, and poet; converted to Judaism upon marrying the first of her four husbands

== Comedians ==
- Dan Ahdoot, finalist Last Comic Standing, 2004
- Dave Attell (born 1965), stand-up comedian; host of Insomniac with Dave Attell
- Victor Borge (born Børge Rosenbaum, 1909–2000), humorist and concert pianist
- Andrew Ginsburg (born 1979), comedian, actor, and three-time champion bodybuilder
- Adam Friedland (born 1986), comedian, podcaster, host of The Adam Friedland Show
- Tom Lehrer (1928–2025), satirist, musician
- Ritz Brothers (Al Ritz, Jimmy Ritz, Harry Ritz), see "Actors"
- Robert Schimmel (1950–2010), stand-up comedian;
- Danny Sexbang (born 1979), member of musical-comedy duo Ninja Sex Party
- Jon Stewart (born Jonathan Stuart Leibowitz, 1962), stand-up comedian, actor, author; host, head writer, and producer of The Daily Show
- Eric Andre (born 1983), actor, host on the Eric Andre Show, absurdist comedian
- Marc Maron (born 1963), stand-up comedian, podcaster, writer, and actor
- Vitaly Zdorovetskiy (born 1992), Russian American comedian, prankster, actor, and Youtube personality

== Film/television directors and producers ==
- J. J. Abrams (born 1966), screenwriter, director, film/TV producer
- Woody Allen (born 1935), Oscar winning screenwriter, director and actor
- Eleanor Antin (born 1935), photographer, author, and artist working with video, film, performance, and drawing
- Judd Apatow (born 1968), screenwriter, director, film/TV producer
- Alan Arkin (1934-2023), Academy Award winning film actor, director
- Danny Arnold (1925–1995), actor/director
- Darren Aronofsky (born 1969), film director, screenwriter and producer
- Ralph Bakshi (born 1938), film director and animator
- Noah Baumbach (born 1969), film screenwriter and director
- Henry Bean (born 1945)
- Richard Benjamin (born 1938), actor/film director
- Curtis Bernhardt (1899–1981, Germany)
- Mike Binder (born 1958), director, writer and actor in film and TV
- Peter Bogdanovich (born 1939), film actor, writer and director
- Zach Braff (born 1975), film/TV actor, director, screenwriter, and producer
- John Brahm (1893–1982, Germany)
- Albert Brooks (born 1947), film actor, writer and director
- James L. Brooks (born 1940), TV and film writer, producer and director
- Mel Brooks (born 1926), writer, director and actor of film, TV and stage
- Richard Brooks (1912–1992), film director and producer
- William Castle (1914–1977), film director and producer
- Joel Coen (born 1954) and Ethan Coen (born 1957), Academy Award-winning film writers, directors, producers and editors
- George Cukor (1899–1983), Academy Award-winning film director and producer
- Michael Curtiz (1886–1962), Academy Award-winning film director
- Jules Dassin (1911–2008), once blacklisted writer and director of film
- Maya Deren (1917–1961), Film writer, director and actress
- Cecil B. DeMille (1881–1959), Academy Award-winning film director and producer
- Stanley Donen (1924–2019), film producer and director
- Richard Donner (1930–2021), film director, producer and sometimes actor
- Robert Downey Sr. (1935–2021), film writer and director
- Samuel Fuller (1912–1997), film writer, director and actor
- Keith Gordon (born 1961), film actor, director and writer
- Lee Grant (born Lyova Haskell Rosenthal, 1927), theater, film, and TV actress, and film director
- James Gray (born 1969), film writer and director
- Joseph Green (1900–1996), Polish-American film director and actor
- Bud Greenspan (1926–2010), director of documentaries on sports
- Christopher Guest (born 1948), see "Actors" above
- Todd Haynes (born 1961), film writer and director
- Amy Heckerling (born 1954), film director
- Marshall Herskovitz (born 1952), film producer and director
- Arthur Hiller (1923–2016), film director and producer
- Agnieszka Holland (born 1948 in Poland)
- Nicole Holofcener (born 1960), writer and director in film
- Henry Jaglom (born 1938), writer, director and actor in Independent film
- Andrew Jarecki (born 1960), film director and producer, musician, and entrepreneur; brother of Eugene Jarecki and half-brother of Nicholas Jarecki
- Eugene Jarecki (born 1964), film director, writer, and producer, and author; brother of Andrew Jarecki and half-brother of Nicholas Jarecki
- Miranda July (born Miranda Jennifer Grossinger, 1974), Jewish father
- Jeremy Paul Kagan (born 1945), film writer and director
- Jake Kasdan (born 1975), film writer and director
- Lawrence Kasdan (born 1949), film writer and director
- Jeffrey Katzenberg (born 1950), film producer, director and co-founder of DreamWorks SKG
- Philip Kaufman (born 1936), film director and screenwriter
- Henry Koster (1905–1988), film director
- Stanley Kramer (1913–2001), director
- Stanley Kubrick (1928–1999)
- John Landis (born 1950), movie actor, director, writer, and producer
- Fritz Lang (1890–1976, Austria, mother born Jewish)
- Andy Lassner (born 1966), Colombian-American television producer
- Norman Lear (1922–2023), film and television director
- Mervyn LeRoy (1900–1987), film director
- Barry Levinson (born 1942), producer, writer and director of film and TV
- Shawn Levy (born 1968), film producer and director
- Albert Lewin (1894–1968), film writer, producer and director
- Jerry Lewis (1926–2017), film actor, writer and director
- Doug Liman (born 1965), film and TV producer and director
- Jonathan Littman (born 1962/1963) television producer
- Lynne Littman (born 1941), film and television director and producer
- Ernst Lubitsch (1892–1947), film director originally from Germany
- Michael Lucas (born 1972, USSR)
- Sidney Lumet (1924–2011), film writer, producer and director
- David Mamet (born 1947), writer and director of stage and screen
- Michael Mann (born 1943), film director, screenwriter, producer
- Elaine May (born 1932), film, TV and stage writer, director and actress
- Paul Mazursky (1930–2014), see "Actors" above
- Lewis Milestone (1895–1980), film director and producer
- John Milius (born 1944)
- Meredith Monk (born 1942), composer, performer, theater director, vocalist, filmmaker, and choreographer
- Errol Morris (born 1948), documentary filmmaker
- Mike Nichols (1931–2014), Emmy, Grammy, Tony and Academy Award-winning film and stage director
- Leonard Nimoy (1931–2015), film director, actor, writer, singer-songwriter, poet, and photographer
- Ken Olin (born 1954), see "Actors" above
- Marcel Ophüls (born 1927), documentary filmmaker, son of Max Ophüls
- Max Ophüls (1902–1957, Germany), father of Marcel Ophüls
- Frank Oz (born 1944), writer, actor and director of film and TV
- Alan J. Pakula (1928–1998), film director and producer
- Jerry Paris (1925–1986), Emmy-winning television director (The Dick Van Dyke Show, Happy Days)
- Larry Peerce (born 1930), film writer and director
- Arthur Penn (1922–2010), film director and producer
- Sydney Pollack (1934-2008), film producer, director, actor and writer
- Abraham Polonsky (1910–1999), film writer and director
- Otto Preminger (1905–1986), film producer, director and actor
- Bob Rafelson (born 1933), film writer-director
- Irving Rapper (1898–1999), British-born film director
- Brett Ratner (born 1969)
- Michele Singer Reiner (1955–2025), film producer
- Ron Rifkin (born 1939), actor, director
- Jay Roach (born 1957), film director, producer and screenwriter, converted to Judaism
- Eli Roth (born 1972), film actor, director, producer and writer
- Julian Schnabel (born 1951)
- Steve Sekely (1899–1979), Hungarian-born film director
- George Sidney (1916–2002), film director, known for MGM films
- Joan Micklin Silver (1935–2020)
- Bryan Singer (born 1965)
- Curt Siodmak (1902–2000)
- Robert Siodmak (1900–1973)
- Barry Sonnenfeld, director
- Steven Spielberg (born 1946)
- Edgar Ulmer (1904–1972, Austria-Hungary)
- Josef von Sternberg (1894, Austria–1969)
- Erich von Stroheim (1885, Austria–1957)
- Robin Washington (born 1956)
- Claudia Weill (born 1947), film and theater director, educator, cinematographer
- Harvey Weinstein (1952)
- Billy Wilder (1906–2002)
- William Wyler (1902, Germany–1981)
- Fred Zinnemann (1907, Austria–1997)
- David Zucker & Jerry Zucker (born 1950), parody directors, producers

== Models ==
- Brooke Burke, TV personality and model
- Yael Markovich, Israeli/American model/beauty queen
- Antonio Sabato Jr., model and actor
- Lindsey Vuolo, model and Playboy Playmate
- Bar Refaeli, model

== TV and radio presenters ==
- Don Francisco (Mario Kreutzberger) (born 1940), network TV host of Sabado Gigante, filmed in Miami
- Adam Friedland (born 1987), Talk show host and comedian; host of The Adam Friedland Show.
- Monty Hall (1924–2017), network TV host of Let's Make a Deal game show
- Mary Hart (born 1950), see "Actors" above
- Daryn Kagan (born 1963), host of CNN Live Today
- Larry King (born Lawrence Harvey Zeiger; 1933–2021), network TV interviewer (Larry King Live)
- Matt Lauer (born 1957), co-host on The Today Show
- Bernard Meltzer (1916-1998), network radio psychologist advising call-in listeners on variety of problems
- Al Michaels (born 1944)
- Amy Wynn Pastor (born 1976), carpenter on Trading Spaces
- Maury Povich (born 1939), network TV host analyzing relationship problems
- Sally Jessie Raphael (born 1935), network radio psychologist
- Joan Rivers (1933–2014), talk show host, stage actress/writer, comedian, and celebrity
- Daniel Schorr (1916–2010), journalist who covered the world for more than 60 years, last as a senior news analyst for National Public Radio
- Jerry Springer (1944–2023), host of The Jerry Springer Show
- Mike Wallace (1918–2012), journalist, 60 Minutes correspondent
- Barbara Walters (1929–2022), media personality, regular fixture on morning TV shows (Today and The View), evening news magazines (20/20), and on The ABC Evening News, as the first female evening news anchor
- Ruth Westheimer (1928–2024), better known as Dr. Ruth, German-American sex therapist, talk show host, author, professor, Holocaust survivor, and former Haganah sniper.

== Producers and directors (theater) ==
Persons listed with a double asterisk (**) are producers who have won the Tony Award for Best Musical and/or the Tony Award for Best Play. Those listed with a triple asterisk (***) have won the Tony Award for Best Direction of a Musical and/or Play. Those listed with a quadruple asterisk (****) have won the Tony Award for Best Actor or Best Actress in a Musical or Play.

- Herb Alpert, producer, and composer, songwriter, lead singer, and horn player with Tijuana Brass
- Boris Aronson, set designer, costume designer and lighting designer
- George Axelrod, producer and director
- Julian Beck and Judith Malina, founders of Living Theatre
- David Belasco, producer and director
- Michael Bennett, director & producer, choreographer, dancer **
- Rudolf Bing (1902–1997), opera impresario, General Manager of the Metropolitan Opera in New York from 1950 to 1972
- Robert Brustein, producer, writer, director, critic, educator
- Abe Burrows, director ***
- Joseph Chaikin & Peter Feldman, founders of Open Theatre
- Paddy Chayefsky, director
- Heinrich Conried, theatre owner/operator and producer
- Norman Corwin, director
- Clive Davis, producer
- Cy Feuer, producer, director and theatre owner/operator **
- Ron Field, director ***
- David Geffen, producer **
- Leonard Goldberg, producer
- Arthur Hammerstein, producer and director (uncle of Oscar Hammerstein II)
- Oscar Hammerstein I, producer and theater director/operator (grandfather of Oscar Hammerstein II)
- Oscar Hammerstein II, producer and director
- Ben Hecht, idiosyncratic screenwriter, director, producer, playwright, and novelist; known as "the Shakespeare of Hollywood"
- Sidney Howard, producer and director
- George Jessel, see "Actors (Theater)" above
- Robert Kalfin, producer, director, writer **
- Mickey Katz, see "Actors (Theater)" above
- George S. Kaufman, producer, director, and theater owner/operator
- Michael Kidd, director and producer
- Alan King, see "Actors (Theater)" above
- James Lapine, director and librettist
- Norman Lear, creator, head screenwriter, and producer of taboo breaking sitcom All in the Family; also created Maude and The Jeffersons
- Ernest Lehman, producer
- Sam Levene, see "Actors (Theater)" above
- Lucille Lortel, Off-Broadway producer, Lucille Lortel Theatre named after her
- Sanford Meisner, founder of Neighbourhood Playhouse
- David Merrick, producer and director **
- Lorne Michaels, comedian, writer, director, producer, the sole creator, writer, director and producer of Saturday Night Live; also produced film and TV projects that spun off from it
- Arthur Miller, playwright
- Mitch Miller, producer
- Isaac Mizrahi (born 1961), fashion designer
- Mike Nichols (1931–2014), Emmy, Grammy, Tony and Academy Award-winning film and stage director
- Toby Orenstein, producer and founder of Toby's Dinner Theatre, Columbia Center for Theatrical Arts, and the Young Columbians
- Joseph Papp a.k.a. Joe Papp, founded the non-profit NYC Public Theater **
- Marc Platt, producer
- Harold Prince, director **, ***
- Elmer Rice, director and producer
- Jerome Robbins, producer and director ***
- Billy Rose, director, producer, and theater operator
- Morrie Ryskind, director
- Rebecca Schull, actress
- Shubert family, producers and theater owners **
- Anna Sokolow, director
- Steven Spielberg, film director, producer
- Lee Strasberg and Harold Clurman, co-founders of the Group Theatre
- Julie Taymor, director ***
- Bob Weinstein, producer, screenwriter
- Harvey Weinstein, producer
- Efrem Zimbalist Jr., see "Actors (Theater)" above
- David Zippel, director

== Circus ==
- Paul Binder, co-founder, ringmaster and artistic director of the Big Apple Circus
- Abe Goldstein, regarded as "the Greatest Irish Cop Clown" in the business and worked for Ringling Bros. and other circuses
- Benjamin Krause, owner/operator of Krause Greater Shows
