= Nick Mullen =

American comedian (born 1988)

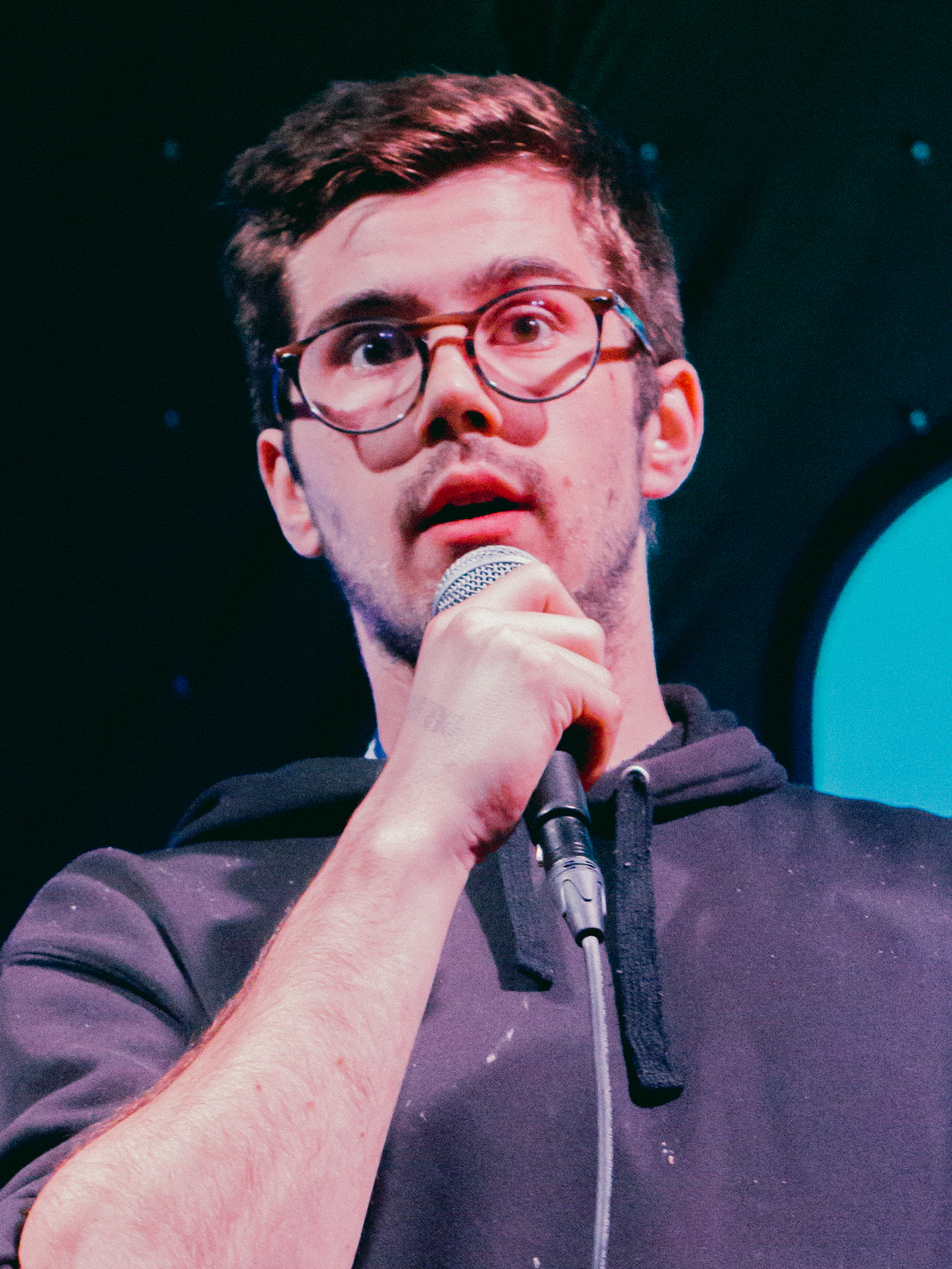
- Mullen in 2014
- Born: Nicholas James Mullen; December 13, 1988 (age 37); Gaithersburg, Maryland, U.S.
- Notable work: Cum Town; The Adam Friedland Show

Comedy career
- Years active: 2005–present
- Medium: Stand-up; podcast; television
- Website: mull.dog

Nicholas James Mullen (born December 13, 1988) is an American stand-up comedian and podcaster. Active since 2005, he is best known as the creator and co-host of the comedy podcast Cum Town (2016–2022) and its successor, The Adam Friedland Show. He released his first stand-up comedy special, Nick Mullen: The Year of the Dragon, in December 2023 via YouTube. His comedy often focuses on internet culture and is ironic, observational, and self-deprecating.

== Career ==
Mullen is of Irish ancestry. Originally from Gaithersburg, Maryland, he began performing in the Washington–Baltimore Metropolitan Area as a teenager, often at the since defunct Wiseacres Comedy Club in McLean, Virginia. During his early twenties, he was based out of Austin, Texas (and briefly Los Angeles).

A nationally touring stand-up, he was an opener for acts including Dana Gould, Jim Norton, Patrice O'Neal, and Hannibal Buress. In 2010, he was named "Best of Fest" at the Laugh Detroit festival. In 2012, he performed at SXSW as part of the Made in Austin and Weekend Spotlight comedy showcases. That same year, he was named one of the New Faces Unrepped by Montreal's Just for Laughs festival. Other festivals include the 2014 Bentzen Ball in Washington, D.C.

From 2013 to 2015, he wrote a blog under the heteronym Nicole Mullen on Thought Catalog. He also had a prank call podcast called Help Me, I'm Old.

In the mid-2010s, Mullen moved to New York City. Prior to Cum Town, he had multiple TV and radio appearances. During the late 2010s, he was a recurring guest on the Real Ass Podcast, Race Wars (hosted by Kurt Metzger and Sherrod Small), and Legion of Skanks. At this time, his writing credits included Comedy Knockout on TruTV (premiered 2016), Make Me Understand with Jim Norton (2016 IFC television pilot), and 2017's Problematic with Moshe Kasher (Comedy Central). Additionally, he made appearances on Fox News' Red Eye as a guest panelist.

In 2016, Mullen created the comedy podcast Cum Town, which he co-hosted with fellow comedians Adam Friedland and Stavros Halkias. The show ran through 2022, ending after the departure of Halkias, and earned a cult following that continues to grow.

Subsequently, Mullen and Friedland started a new venture, The Adam Friedland Show. The show began as a podcast co-hosted by Mullen and Friedland, releasing the first episode in June 2022, ahead of the roll-out as long-form comedic talk show in October 2022. The podcast continued to serve as a companion series until its conclusion in 2025. Mullen served as the primary producer of the talk show's first season, which ran for twenty episodes through December 2024. Mullen departed the show in January 2025, citing new interests and burnout and continues to be credited as a creator and executive producer.

His first stand-up special, Nick Mullen: The Year of the Dragon, was released on December 3, 2023, reaching one million views after its first week of release.

Since 2025, Mullen has focused on work as a stand-up comedian, gravitating toward live comedy as opposed to produced content. He tours nationally and occasionally appears as a guest on comedy podcasts. As a comedy writer, he contributed to 2026's The Roast of Kevin Hart (Netflix), among other projects.

== Personal life ==
Mullen lives in Brooklyn, New York. He previously lived in Manhattan's Chinatown; some of his comedic anecdotes draw from his experience living there in a windowless tenement.

=== Political beliefs ===
Mullen has been a vocal supporter of many social democratic political positions on podcasts and interviews throughout his career, including universal health care. In his 2023 stand-up special, Nick Mullen: The Year of the Dragon, he stated, "I believe that health care is a human right. I think everybody should have it: free, easy access." Mullen stated in 2024 on an episode of The Adam Friedland Show Podcast that "I'm not a communist, I want to make that clear." While being pressed by colleague Ari Shaffir on his politics, he clarified, "If you really had to put me in a box, I'm nothing more than just a run-of-the-mill social democrat."

In 2025, Mullen appeared in an Instagram video with Zohran Mamdani to promote the latter's successful campaign in the 2025 New York City Democratic mayoral primary.

== Works ==
=== Comedy specials ===
- Nick Mullen: The Year of the Dragon (2023)

=== Podcasts ===
- Cum Town (2016–2022)
- The Adam Friedland Show Podcast (2022–2025)

=== As writer and producer ===
Year	Title	Released On	Credited as	Notes
2016	Make Me Understand with Jim Norton	IFC	Producer	Television pilot
2017	Problematic with Moshe Kasher	Comedy Central	Writer	Talk show series
2021	Gilly and Keeves	YouTube	Writer	Sketch comedy series; episode: 1x13
2022–2025	The Adam Friedland Show	YouTube	Writer, producer, director	Talk show series; season one
2023	Nick Mullen: The Year of the Dragon	YouTube	Creator	Comedy special
2026	The Roast of Kevin Hart	Netflix	Writer	Comedy special
2026	Chunks	Patreon	Writer	Comedy anthology film
