= Thumb (film) =

- Directed by: Daina Oniunas-Pusić
- Written by: Cesar Vitale
- Produced by: Akiva Goldsman; Greg Lessans; Richard Saperstein; Brooke Saperstein; Annie Saperstein; Beau Turpin
- Starring: Milly Alcock; Awkwafina; Kate McKinnon; Sofía Vergara; Stavros Halkias; Hannibal Buress; Michael Zegen
- Production companies: Weed Road; Bluestone Entertainment
- Country: United States
- Language: English

Thumb is an upcoming American black comedy film directed by Daina Oniunas-Pusić and written by Cesar Vitale. It stars Milly Alcock, Awkwafina, Kate McKinnon, Sofía Vergara, Stavros Halkias, Hannibal Buress, and Michael Zegen.

== Cast ==
- Milly Alcock
- Awkwafina
- Kate McKinnon
- Sofía Vergara
- Stavros Halkias
- Hannibal Buress
- Michael Zegen

== Production ==
In August 2025, it was reported that Daina Oniunas-Pusić would be directing a black comedy film, with the script by Cesar Vitale, and Milly Alcock in the lead role. Principal photography began in mid-November 2025 in New York City, with Awkwafina, Kate McKinnon, Sofía Vergara, Stavros Halkias, Hannibal Buress, and Michael Zegen joining the cast.
