= Cum Town =

American comedy podcast, 2016–2022

- Genre: Black comedy; blue humor; surreal humor; anti-humor; political satire
- Language: English

Cast and voices
- Hosted by: Nick Mullen; Stavros Halkias; Adam Friedland

Production
- Production: Nick Mullen
- Length: 60–90 minutes

Publication
- No. of episodes: 317 (+ 278 premium)
- Original release: May 11, 2016 – June 23, 2022 (Note: Farewell episode released on March 3, 2025)
- Updates: Twice weekly

Related
- Related shows: The Adam Friedland Show; Stavvy’s World; Chapo Trap House; Red Scare
- Website: patreon.com/CumtownArchive

Cum Town is a comedy podcast hosted by New York City based comedians Nick Mullen, Stavros Halkias, and Adam Friedland, and produced between 2016 and 2022 (with a single finale episode in 2025). During its run, it was consistently one of the most popular podcasts on Patreon and at its 2022 conclusion was one of the top 25 comedy podcasts on Spotify and Apple Podcasts. In July 2022, it was succeeded by Mullen and Friedland's spin-off podcast and interview show The Adam Friedland Show.

== History ==
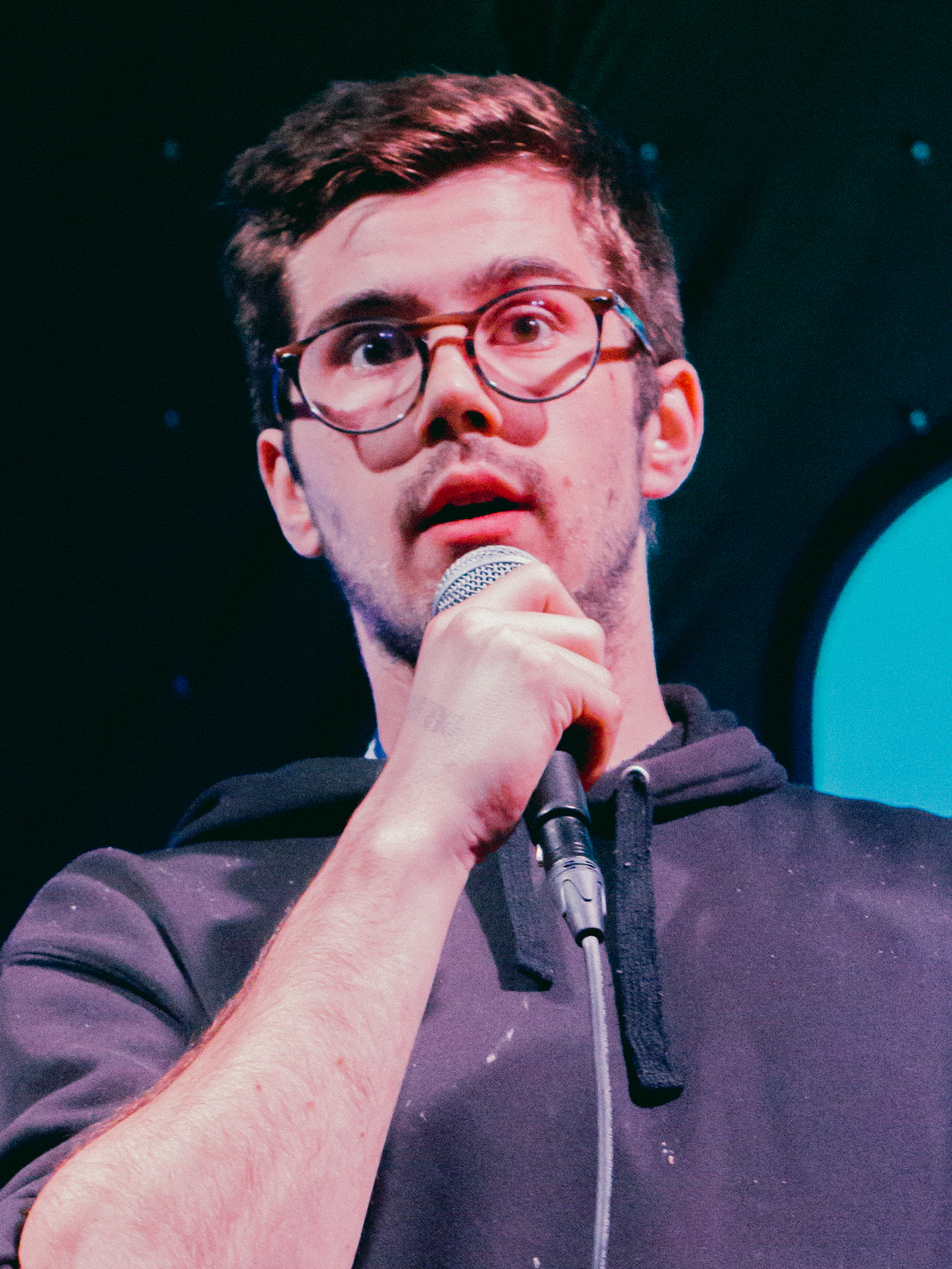
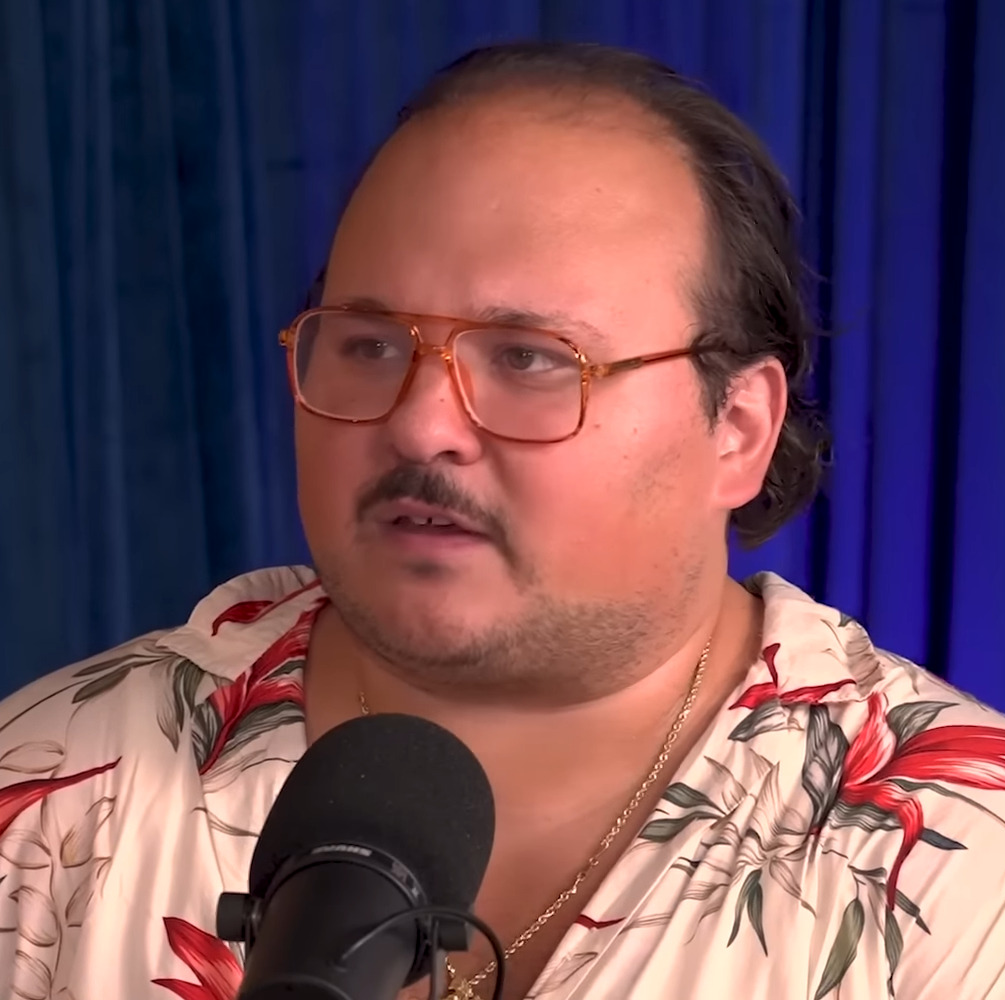
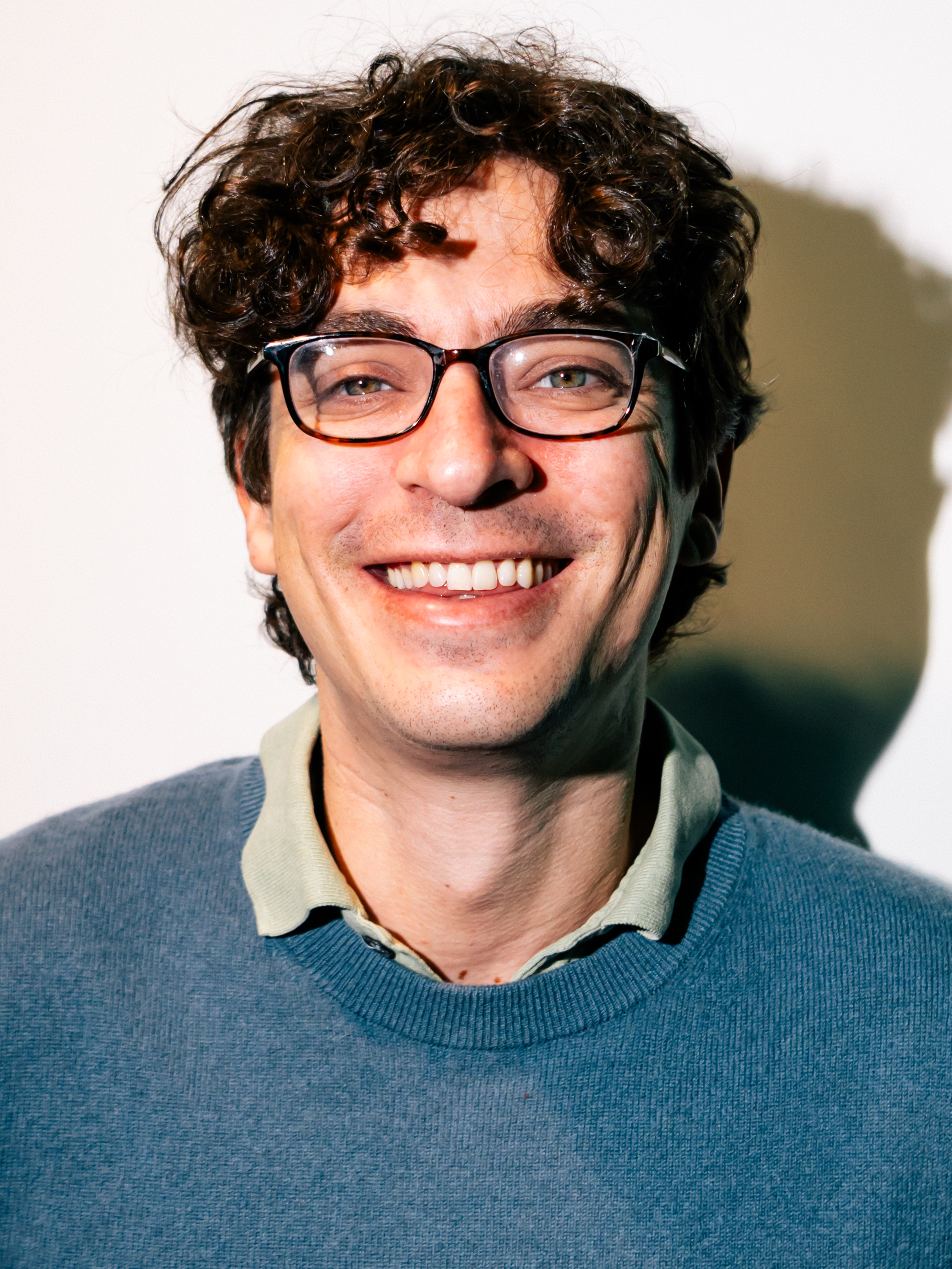
Cum Town hosts (left to right) Nick Mullen, Stavros Halkias, and Adam Friedland

In 2016, Cum Town was created by Nick Mullen, the primary host and producer of the show. Stavros Halkias was the first co-host; Adam Friedland became a second co-host, starting as a frequent guest and first appearing in the show's second episode.

The podcast concluded in June 2022 after months of the hosts suggesting its end as well as their renewed interest in stand-up comedy, particularly Halkias, who released his debut comedy special that month. On June 25, 2022, Halkias announced that he was no longer part of Cum Town. Subsequently, Mullen and Friedland revealed their plan for a spin-off podcast, The Adam Friedland Show, to be hosted by Friedland and produced by Mullen.

On March 3, 2025, an episode titled Cum Town Farewell was uploaded to the podcast's Patreon account, with its description having described the release as "...the final episode of Cum Town," accompanying a larger expression of gratitude for fans of the podcast.

== Content ==
Cum Town episodes were generally 60 minutes long and consisted of improvised comedy blended with casual unscripted conversation. Featured guests included Tim Dillon, David Cross, Bam Margera, Dan Soder, Bonnie McFarlane, Jim Norton, Kurt Metzger, Brandon Wardell, and Dasha Nekrasova.

Many of the show's riffs came from crude puns and rhymes—for example, "Louis SeemsGay" for Louis C.K.—and involved sexually explicit scenarios or ethnic and racial stereotypes. Conversations generally centered on the hosts' personal lives, the news, the worlds of stand-up comedy and social media, and pop culture history. Friedland often served as the butt of Mullen's and Halkias's jokes and insults.

Mullen did many celebrity impressions, including Donald Trump, Barack Obama, Tucker Carlson, Michael Douglas, Dennis Hopper, E. Jean Carroll, Dwayne Johnson, Joe Biden, Andrew Cuomo, Patrick Warburton, Rip Torn, Gene Hackman, Jon Hamm, Norm MacDonald, Joe List, Mark Normand, Jason Statham, Ice-T, Dave Portnoy, James Gandolfini, Sean Connery, Regis Philbin, Jerry Seinfeld and Homer Simpson, with some episodes of the show featuring him trying to perfect a new impression on-air.

== Availability and listenership ==
Weekly free episodes of the show were available via Spotify, Apple Podcasts, and Audible, among other services. Subscribers who contributed at least $5 per month via Patreon gain access to additional weekly premium bonus episodes. During the early months of the COVID-19 pandemic, the show was conducted via Zoom; episodes were broadcast live via YouTube.

In June 2022, Cum Town was the 10th-most popular podcast on Patreon and the 12th-most popular creator on the platform overall; with more than 20,000 paying members, it had around $100,000 in monthly earnings. It was the number one podcast on the platform for most of 2017 and 2018. On Apple Podcasts, it was the 17th-most popular comedy podcast in the U.S. and 126th overall.

== Reception ==
=== Dirtbag left association ===
Cum Town was often associated with the dirtbag left, though it is not expressly political. A February 2020 New York Times article described Cum Town (by allusion, citing its "unprintable name") as "bards of the new American left", alongside podcasts Chapo Trap House and Red Scare. Several Chapo hosts, including Amber A'Lee Frost, Will Menaker, and Felix Biederman have appeared on Cum Town; Mullen, Halkias, and Friedland have made multiple appearances on Chapo.

Though the hosts occasionally discuss their responses to current events and politics—with all three expressing support for 2020 presidential candidate Bernie Sanders—they deny any specific political agenda. Mullen attributed people's tendency to associate the podcast with the movement to the Cum Town hosts being part of the same Brooklyn social circle as the hosts of Chapo Trap House. In May 2017, Friedland tweeted, "Cum town is not a socialist podcast it's not a fascist podcast it's a podcast about being gay with your dad."

In July 2021, the hosts disagreed with Andrew Marantz's characterization of the podcast as a "flagship product of the dirtbag left" in a New Yorker article. Halkias instead suggested that its motivating force was not political but financial. The hosts initially believed the podcast would be unsuccessful, "and people are stupid enough to give us money, and we are trapped doing [the podcast]".

=== Criticism ===
In association with their dirtbag left peers, the podcast and its hosts have been criticized for their use of ironic offensiveness. One blogger argued that the hosts' use of slurs and edgy jokes, particularly Mullen's, perpetuates harassment and continually crosses the line into actual hatred and contempt. Others have countered that offensiveness is subjective. In 2018, the co-hosts jokingly compared the treatment of their podcast to Milo Yiannopoulos and Carl Benjamin, who both got their Patreon accounts suspended for similar jokes. Mullen jokingly noted, "we're the good guys...we're on the right side of history."

Some online commentators have made a distinction between the podcast and their listeners, critiquing the show's fan base as opposed to the hosts, or critiquing both in tandem. In 2020, the podcast's subreddit (which was not moderated or endorsed by the hosts) was removed from Reddit due to the platform's new policies on hate speech.
