= The Adam Friedland Show =

American talk show (2022–)

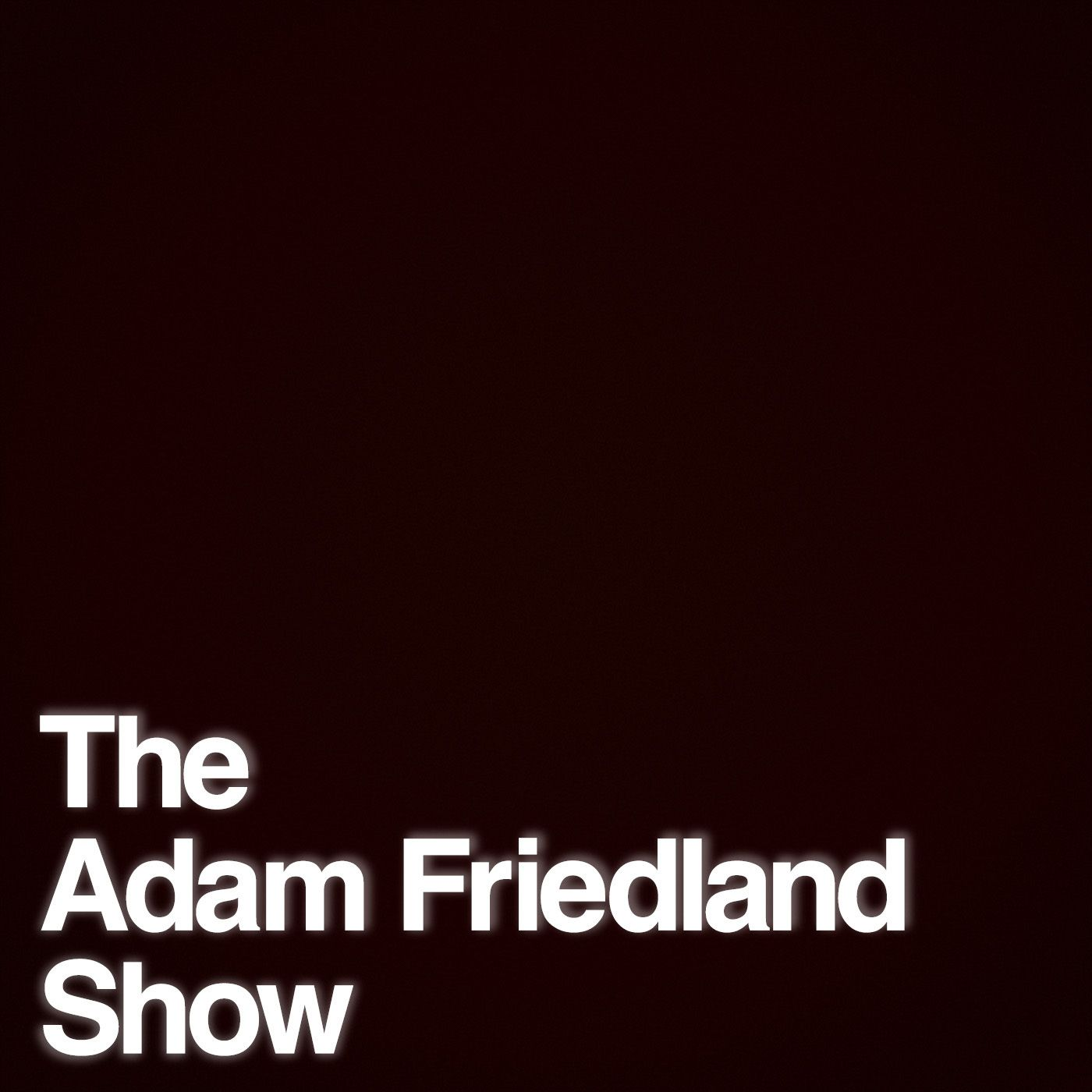
- Genre: Talk show; black comedy; blue humor; surreal humor; anti-humor; political satire
- Created by: Adam Friedland; Nick Mullen
- Written by: Adam Friedland; Nick Mullen (season 1); Caleb Pitts (season 2–present)
- Starring: Adam
- Theme music composer: Mac DeMarco; Henry Kwapis; Jared Solomon; Daryl Johns; Remi Wolf
- Composer: Christian Lopetz
- Original language: English
- No. of seasons: 3
- No. of episodes: 77

Production
- Executive producers: Adam Friedland; Nick Mullen; Marc Fineman (season 2–present); Mason Klein (season 2-present)
- Producers: Nick Mullen (season 1); Dave McVeigh Jr. (season 1); Caleb Pitts (season 2-present); Thomas Pistor Eisenman (season 2-present)
- Running time: 26–93 minutes
- Production companies: Funny Moms International; Mullen Media (season 1); Jomax Productions (season 2–present)

Original release
- Release: October 31, 2022 – present

The Adam Friedland Show is a talk show hosted by comedian Adam Friedland, centered on long-form comedic interviews with public figures. Marked by satire and deadpan anti-humor, the show parodies traditional talk shows and takes place on a set modeled after the set of The Dick Cavett Show.

The show, referred to as TAFS for short, has been host to guests from a variety of fields, including athletes (Blake Griffin), musicians (Chance the Rapper), actors (Sarah Jessica Parker), comedians (Shane Gillis), filmmakers (Paul Schrader), businesspeople (Mark Cuban), journalists (Olivia Nuzzi), influencers (Amelia Dimoldenberg), and politicians (Gavin Newsom).

The show was created by Friedland and comedian Nick Mullen and debuted on October 31, 2022. The first iteration, season one, heavily employed meta-comedy and included comedy sketches. Season two ran from May 2025 to May 2026 and marked a shift to a more regular, biweekly format that focused on interviews with Friedland; the show received more critical acclaim in its second season, with GQ calling Friedland a potential "millennial Jon Stewart". In June 2026, the show partnered with Spotify ahead of its third season, which premiered in August 2026.

== Production ==
=== Development ===
From 2016 to 2022, Adam Friedland, Stavros Halkias, and Nick Mullen co-hosted Cum Town, which The New Yorker called one of the most successful comedy podcasts of the decade. When Halkias announced that he was departing Cum Town in June of 2022, Friedland and Mullen ended the show and revealed plans for a spin-off production—The Adam Friedland Show—a YouTube talk show to be hosted by Friedland and produced by Mullen. Turning Friedland, who was often the butt of jokes on Cum Town, into the star of a new program, began as mostly a joke; though, over time he grew into the role.

In August of 2022, Friedland and Mullen began releasing test episodes of The Adam Friedland Show on Patreon while the set was being constructed. These episodes were shot on the unfurnished studio, and episodes of a companion podcast The Adam Friedland Show Podcast began being released as well.

=== Season one ===
The set for the show was completed in the fall of 2022 and modeled after that of The Dick Cavett Show. The show aired its first official episode on Halloween, 2022, with Friedland hosting in a loose brown suit. The first episode saw Adam, co-host Nick Mullen, and guest Shane Gillis all in Halloween costumes throughout the episode, with Mullen as Dracula and Gillis as Frankenstein.

Following the second episode, Mullen stopped appearing as co-host to focus on producing the show and acting in character bits. Most episodes for the rest of the season featured an opening pre-taped sketch taking place behind the scenes of the show, usually with Friedland as himself and Mullen as either himself, the show's producer Dracula, or political blogger Jeff Tiedrich's demented nephew Marty Tiedrich. Two later episodes in the season, the Rob Schneider episode and the Paul Schrader episode, each opened on a more elaborate short film. The Schrader episode featured Adam Friedland's Taxi Driver, an elaborate short about Friedland making a Taxi Driver parody in which he plays all the parts, and the Schneider episode featured Nick & Adam 1998, a short film written and directed by Mullen about 11-year-old versions of Friedland and Mullen going to see the movie The Waterboy. Sopranos star Drea DeMatteo played Friedland's mother.

Friedland said that in 2023, he "decided to start trying to be a good interviewer."

On January 25, 2025, Mullen departed from the show; he continues to be credited as a creator and executive producer. Podcast episodes stopped being released, and the show pivoted to focusing on the YouTube talk show. The show no longer featured an opening sketch, instead just focusing on Friedland's interview.

In February 2025, Friedland began releasing a series of episodes called "The Lost Episodes." These were interviews that were recorded in the studio with Drea DeMatteo, Julian Casablancas, Tom Fontana, and Hasan Piker that were not released during the first season for various reasons.

=== Season two ===
In May 2025, trailers began to release for the show, and Friedland began a press tour with a profile in GQ, as well as numerous podcast appearances promoting his show and personal brand. As producers, Friedland was joined by comedian Caleb Pitts, who was also promoted to head writer, and filmmaker Thomas Pistor Eisenman, who also serves as editor.

On May 28, 2025, Friedland released a surprise announcement, revealing that he had been working on a revamped second season of the show. This season would have a regular weekly release of an hour-long talk show episode. This was a large change compared to the first season's sporadic release over a period of over two years, oftentimes with gaps in production of several months.

Friedland's second season earned mainstream acclaim, with several favorable write-ups praising his offbeat interview style, the show's avant-garde production, and his hard-hitting questions. The New Yorker described The Adam Friedland Show as "subversive" and "irresistibly funny".

Friedland's August 27, 2025 interview with Congressman Ritchie Torres, in which Friedland emotionally confronted the politician over his support for Israel, drew a positive response and press coverage, with some calling it a breakthrough moment. The show also received considerable attention for scoring an interview with New York City mayor elect Zohran Mamdani immediately following his victory.

=== Season three ===
In June 2026, a new distribution and ad sales partnership with Spotify was announced. As part of the new deal with the company, a World Cup-focused podcast miniseries was produced in collaboration with The Ringer, a Spotify vertical: The Adam Friedland Show Presents: The Beautiful Pod; the show was co-hosted by Friedland and sports commentator Chris Ryan.

== Format ==
The show typically begins with a highlight from the interview, the theme song/opening credits, and a short segment where host Adam Friedland addresses the viewer from a room full of audiovisual equipment. After this introduction portion, an interview with that week's guest usually runs for about an hour with an ad break in the middle. Occasionally, there's a segment in between Friedland's intro and the interview.

For most of the first season, the show opened with a metafictional sketch involving Friedland and co-creator Nick Mullen discussing the show and its production, including their feud with fictional producer Dracula (played by Mullen). In early episodes, it was followed by a late night-style monologue in which Friedland comments on recent events, which was then followed by the interview.

== Episodes ==
Season	Episodes	Originally released	
Season	Episodes	First released	Last released
1	20	October 31, 2022	December 12, 2024
2	47	May 28, 2025	May 23, 2026
3	TBD	August 26, 2026	TBA

=== Season 1 (2022–2024) ===
No. overall	No. in season	Title	Original release date
1	1	"Halloween Special (Shane Gillis)"	October 31, 2022
2	2	"Episode 102 (Mike Recine)"	November 3, 2022
3	3	"Mac DeMarco"	December 7, 2022
4	4	"Ghost Of Adam Future (Doug Levinson)"	December 14, 2022
5	5	"Bon Jovi (Gene DiNapoli)"	December 21, 2022
Note: This is the last episode to use handheld microphones.
6	6	"Simon Rex"	February 1, 2023
7	7	"Ariel Pink"	February 8, 2023
8	8	"The Great Debate (Gene DiNapoli and Doug Levinson)"	February 21, 2023
9	9	"Jim Norton"	March 6, 2023
10	10	"Ernie Hudson"	March 20, 2023
11	11	"Norman Finkelstein"	April 3, 2023
12	12	"Binging with Babish (Andrew Rea)"	April 27, 2023
Note: Friedland mentions on the episode that Alan Dershowitz has been booked as a guest, but after Donald Trump's March 2023 indictment two days prior to the taping, Dershowitz stopped responding to emails, so Friedland booked his friend Andrew Rea on short notice. Note: This is the last episode to start with a late night-style monologue.
13	13	"Neil DeGrasse Tyson"	May 17, 2023
14	14	"Chris Cuomo"	June 14, 2023
15	15	"Jadakiss"	July 12, 2023
16	16	"Chet Hanks"	October 1, 2023
17	17	"Dave Portnoy"	November 5, 2023
18	18	"Paul Schrader"	March 7, 2024
19	19	"Rob Schneider"	October 27, 2024
20	20	"Destiny"	December 12, 2024

=== The Lost Episodes (2025) ===
Following Nick Mullen's departure from the show in early 2025, The Adam Friedland Show released a quartet of episodes billed as "The Lost Episodes," inspired by the title of Chappelle's Show's "Lost Episodes." These are interviews that were filmed in studio between 2023 and 2024, with new introductions from Friedland filmed in 2025.

No. overall	No. in season	Title	Original release date
21	1	"Drea de Matteo"	February 2, 2025
Note: Friedland says in the episode that this interview was recorded two months prior to Drea de Matteo acting in Nick Mullen's short "Adam and Nick 1998," which aired during the Rob Schneider episode in 2024, but Mullen suggested holding the episode due to de Matteo's acting role in the short.
22	2	"Julian Casablancas"	February 10, 2025
Note: This is the last episode to feature a pre-taped cold open sketch.
23	3	"Tom Fontana"	February 16, 2025
Note: This episode was recorded in 2023.
24	4	"Hasan Piker"	April 25, 2025
Note: This episode was recorded on May 14, 2024.

=== Season 2 (2025–2026) ===
No. overall	No. in season	Title	Original release date	Guest(s)
25	1	"ANTHONY WEINER Talks Scandal, 2016 Election, Hillary Clinton"	May 28, 2025	Anthony Weiner
26	2	"RO KHANNA Talks Elon Musk, Bernie Sanders, Can We Fix This?"	June 4, 2025	Ro Khanna
27	3	"SARAH JESSICA PARKER Talks Sex & The City, Hollywood Relationships, New Pope"	June 11, 2025	Sarah Jessica Parker
28	4	"ANTHONY FANTANO Talks Radiohead, Abbey Road, Drake vs. Kendrick"	June 19, 2025	Anthony Fantano
29	5	"STEINY Talks Trump, Musk, NELK Boys"	June 26, 2025	Steiny
30	6	"BLAKE GRIFFIN Talks GOAT Debate, Donald Sterling, Retirement"	July 10, 2025	Blake Griffin
31	7	"HARRY SISSON Talks Kamala Vs. Trump, Gen Z, Controversy"	July 16, 2025	Harry Sisson
32	8	"G HERBO Talks Drake Vs. Kendrick, DJ Akademiks, Chiraq"	July 23, 2025	G Herbo
33	9	"LOGIC Talks Wild Childhood, Music Industry, His New Movie"	August 20, 2025	Logic
34	10	"RITCHIE TORRES Talks Zionism, LGBT, The Bronx"	August 27, 2025	Ritchie Torres
35	11	"AMANDA KNOX talks Trial, Amélie, Redemption"	September 3, 2025	Amanda Knox
36	12	"TAYLOR LORENZ Talks Journalism, Internet Labor, Viral Culture"	September 10, 2025	Taylor Lorenz
37	13	"RAINN WILSON talks Dwight, Clowning, Baháʼí"	September 17, 2025	Rainn Wilson
38	14	"DAVID HOGG Talks Parkland, DNC, Saving the Party"	September 25, 2025	David Hogg
39	15	"MIA KHALIFA Talks Viral Fame, Fatwa, Being the GOAT"	October 1, 2025	Mia Khalifa
40	16	"MICHAEL KNOWLES Talks Theater, Daily Wire, Conservative Media"	October 8, 2025	Michael Knowles
41	17	"RICHARD KIND Talks Coen Brothers, Death, And George Clooney"	October 15, 2025	Richard Kind
42	18	"SENATOR CHRIS MURPHY Talks Loneliness Epidemic, Internet, Democratic Coalition"	October 22, 2025	Chris Murphy
43	19	"CHANCE THE RAPPER Talks Chicago, Mixtapes and Mentors"	October 29, 2025	Chance the Rapper
44	20	"AMELIA DIMOLDENBERG Talks Chicken, Flirting, and UK Rap"	November 5, 2025	Amelia Dimoldenberg
45	21	"LINA KHAN Talks FTC, Monopolies, Biden"	November 12, 2025	Lina Khan
46	22	"WILLIAM H. MACY Talks Fargo, Auditions, PTA"	November 19, 2025	William H. Macy
47	23	"ZOHRAN MAMDANI Talks Meeting Trump, Mayoral Election, Arsenal"	November 24, 2025	Zohran Mamdani
48	24	"ALEC BALDWIN Talks 30 Rock, Fatherhood, Trial"	December 3, 2025	Alec Baldwin
49	25	"NICK WRIGHT Talks LeBron, Skip, Pundit Beef"	December 10, 2025	Nick Wright
50	26	"OLIVIA NUZZI Talks Trump, RFK Scandal, American Canto"	December 17, 2025	Olivia Nuzzi
51	27	"KEVIN O'LEARY Talks Shark Tank, Marty Supreme, Millionaire Lifestyle"	December 23, 2025	Kevin O'Leary
52	28	"DANNY BROWN Talks Diddy, BBWs, 50 Cent"	December 30, 2025	Danny Brown
53	29	"JOHN C. REILLY Talks Step Brothers, Empathy, New Album"	January 9, 2026	John C. Reilly
54	30	"SCOTT JENNINGS Talks Bush Presidency, Debates, CNN"	January 13, 2026	Scott Jennings
55	31	"JON FAVREAU Talks Obama, Bin Laden, ICE"	January 20, 2026	Jon Favreau
56	32	"CHUCK KLOSTERMAN Talks Football, Violence, American Identity"	January 28, 2026	Chuck Klosterman
57	33	"FKA TWIGS Talks Stans, Eusexua, Seduction"	February 3, 2026	FKA Twigs
58	34	"MJ Lenderman CALLS OUT Cameron Winter (not clickbait)"	February 11, 2026	MJ Lenderman
59	35	"CLAVICULAR Talks Female Psychology, Drug Habit, Infamy"	February 16, 2026	Clavicular
60	36	"JEFF GARLIN Talks Curb Your Enthusiasm, Epstein, Photography"	February 24, 2026	Jeff Garlin
61	37	"GOV. GAVIN NEWSOM Talks California, ICE, New Book"	March 3, 2026	Gavin Newsom
62	38	"MARK CUBAN Talks Luka Trade, Epstein, Steve Ballmer"	March 10, 2026	Mark Cuban
63	39	"SEAN AVERY Talks NHL Fights, Trash Talk, Christopher Nolan"	March 18, 2026	Sean Avery
64	40	"2 CHAINZ Talks Weed, Intuition, and Becoming Himself"	March 25, 2026	2 Chainz
65	41	"WYCLEF JEAN Talks Haiti, New Music, Legacy"	April 2, 2026	Wyclef Jean
66	42	"MJF Talks Wrestling, Ego, and Stardom"	April 8, 2026	Maxwell Jacob Friedman
67	43	"Rep. ILHAN OMAR Talks Terror In Minneapolis And Becoming American"	April 14, 2026	Ilhan Omar
68	44	"MAURY POVICH Talks Drama, Conflict and Why We Can't Look Away"	April 21, 2026	Maury Povich
69	45	"GOV. WES MOORE Talks Military Service, Iran War, Oprah"	April 28, 2026	Wes Moore
70	46	"RZA Talks Wu-Tang, Creation, New Film"	May 5, 2026	RZA
71	47	"TIM HEIDECKER Talks Contrarian Comedy, Sincerity, and Playing the Long Game"	May 23, 2026	Tim Heidecker

=== The Lost Episodes (2026) ===
No. overall	No. in season	Title	Original release date	Guest(s)
72	1	"The Lost Episodes: Don Lemon"	July 29, 2026	Don Lemon
Note: This episode was recorded in 2025.
73	2	"The Lost Episodes: MIA"	August 5, 2026	MIA
74	3	"The Lost Episodes: Mahmoud Khalil"	August 12, 2026	Mahmoud Khalil
75	4	"The Lost Episodes: Ann Coulter"	August 20, 2026	Ann Coulter

=== Season 3 (2026–) ===
No. overall	No. in season	Title	Original release date	Guest(s)
76	1	"CURTIS SLIWA Talks Violence, Vigilantism, Jewish"	August 26, 2026	Curtis Sliwa
77	2	"HUNTER BIDEN Talks Recovery, Gaza, Family"	September 2, 2026	Hunter Biden
78	3	"WOAH VICKY Talks Poetry, Identity, Nelson Mandela"	September 9, 2026	Woah Vicky
79	4	"COLIN KAEPERNICK Talks His Failures, Gay Teammates, Jay-Z"	September 16, 2026	Colin Kaepernick
80	5	"NATE SOARES talks Ai Doomsday, Elon Musk, The Matrix"	September 23, 2026	Nate Soares
81	6	"DANNY MCBRIDE Talks First Novel, Ghostly Encounters, North Carolina"	September 30, 2026	Danny McBride
82	7	"JOHN WILSON Talks Concrete, Getting Jumped, and Avatar"	October 7, 2026	John Wilson
83	8	"GRIMES Talks Elon Musk, AI, and the End of Humanity"	October 15, 2026	Grimes
84	9	"MATTY MATHESON Talks The Bear, Bad Customers, Burgers"	October 21, 2026	Matty Matheson
Note: Guest was initially announced as Andrew Callaghan
85	10	"ALICE COOPER Talks Elvis, Guillotines, Tiger Woods"	October 28, 2026	Alice Cooper
86	11	"MARC MARON Talks Trump, Cocaine, and the Death of Podcasting"	November 4, 2026	Marc Maron
87	12	"SOFIA FRANKLYN on Alex Cooper's BETRAYAL"	November 10, 2026	Sofia Franklyn
88	13	"MATTHEW COLE Talks Kushner's SECRET Deals, SHOCKING Middle East Corruption"	November 18, 2026	Matthew Cole

=== TAFS Unplugged ===
No. overall	No. in season	Title	Original release date
1	1	"Cass McCombs"	October 31, 2025
Songs performed: "Miss Mabee" and "Home at Last".
2	2	"MJ Lenderman"	February 13, 2026
Songs performed: "The French Inhaler" and "Stay at Home Cowboy".
3	3	"xaviersobased"	March 6, 2026
Songs performed: "Tony Hawk" and "Seen A Lot Of Things" (feat. ksuuvi).
4	4	"Wyclef Jean"	April 4, 2026
Songs performed: "Gone Till November", "If I Was President", "Sweetest Girl (Dollar Bill)", "Hips Don't Lie", "Maria Maria", "Ready or Not","Fu-Gee-La", and "Redemption Song".
5	5	"Bruce Hornsby"	April 17, 2026
Songs performed: "Might As Well Be Me", "Sneaking Up on Boo Bradley", and "Silhouette Shadows".
6	6	"Joanne Robertson"	April 30, 2026
Songs performed: "Blue Car", "Gown", and "Ghost".
7	7	"Kurt Vile"	May 15, 2026
Songs performed: "Zoom 97", "Every Time I Look at You", and "Hit of The Highlife".
8	8	"YHWH Nailgun"	May 29, 2026
Songs performed: "Sickle Walk", "Give Blood", "Ballerine", and "Hips on a Wheel".
9	9	"Bill Callahan"	June 19, 2026
Songs performed: "Why Do Men Sing", "Computer", and "Pathol O.G.".
10	10	"Slow Pulp"	September 4, 2026
Songs performed: "Yellow and Green", "Better Man", and "Slip Away".
11	11	"Iceage"	September 18, 2026
Songs performed: "Ember", "Star", "The Weak", "Tender Blades".
12	12	"Grace Ives"	October 2, 2026
Songs performed: "My Mans", "Anything", "Fire 2".
13	13	"Sublime"	October 23, 2026
Songs performed: "Badfish", "Until The Sun Explodes", "Santeria", "S.T.P.".
14	14	"J Mascis"	October 30, 2026
Songs performed: “Little Fury Things", "Several Got Away", "Out There".
15	15	"Smerz"	November 13, 2026
Songs performed: "Imagine this", "Big city life", "You got time and I got money".

== Podcast ==
The show's companion podcast, The Adam Friedland Show Podcast (similar to Cum Town in format), ran weekly from 2022 to 2025. It ceased airing on the show's shift to the talk show only model in 2025, though audio of the main episodes continue to be released on the podcast feed.

The podcast featured a variety of guests, including podcasters Will Menaker and Brace Belden, comedians Mike Recine, Rick Glassman, Jordan Jensen, Brandon Wardell, and Chris Distefano, as well as Jackass star Steve-O and The Sopranos actor Robert Iler. Friedland's former fiancée Dasha Nekrasova also appeared on a non-interview episode, alongside her Red Scare podcast co-host Anna Khachiyan.

Singer Matty Healy's appearance was a source of controversy, amid rumors of a relationship with Taylor Swift and an apparent call-out by Rina Sawayama during a concert. Healy dismissed the outrage as a "bit mental."
