= Stavros Halkias =

American comedian (born 1989)

- Σταύρος Χαλκιάς
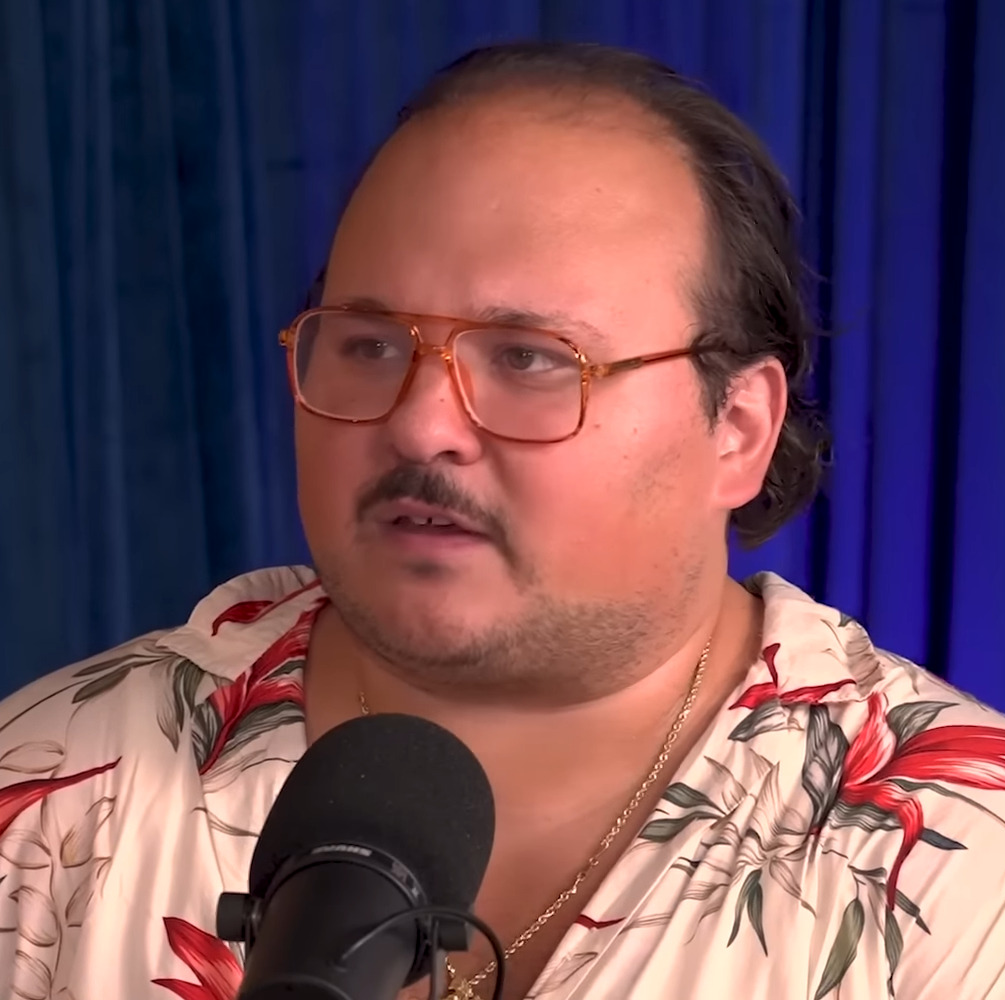
- Halkias in 2024
- Born: Stavros Emmanuel Halkias; February 11, 1989 (age 37); Baltimore, Maryland, U.S.
- Education: University of Maryland, Baltimore County
- Notable work: Cum Town (2016–2022); Stavvy's World (2022–present)
- Height: 5 ft 7 in (170 cm)

Comedy career
- Years active: 2012–present
- Medium: Stand-up; podcast
- Genres: Black comedy; blue humor; surreal humor; anti-humor; political satire
- Website: stavvy.biz

Stavros Emmanuel Halkias (Note: English: /ˈstɑːvroʊs ˈhælkiəs/ STAH-vrohss HAL-kee-əs; Greek: Σταύρος Χαλκιάς, pronounced [ˈstavɾos xalˈcas].) (born February 11, 1989) is an American comedian, writer, actor, and podcaster. Active since the early 2010s, he is a nationally touring comic who came to prominence as a founding co-host of the podcast Cum Town. He broke through in the 2020s with the release of popular back-to-back stand up specials, Live at the Lodge Room (2022) and Stavros Halkias: Fat Rascal, released by Netflix in 2023. Since 2024, he has also performed as an actor, including supporting roles in the Netflix comedy series Tires (2024–present), the 2025 Yorgos Lanthimos film Bugonia, and the 2026 Anthony Bourdain biopic Tony.

== Early life ==
Halkias was born on February 11, 1989, and raised in Baltimore, Maryland, to Greek immigrant parents: a Macedonian mother and Athenian contractor father. His first visit to Greece occurred when he was nine months old; during which he was also baptized in the Orthodox Church of Greece. He has publicly spoken about being bullied for his weight as a child. Later, Halkias attended the Baltimore Polytechnic Institute, a public high school where he played football. He attended the University of Maryland, Baltimore County (UMBC), working for Marc Steiner's Center for Emerging Media as an intern. He stated on the podcast Digression Sessions that he was a few credits short of graduating.

== Career ==
=== 2008–2022: Emergence and podcasting ===
Halkias began performing comedy at age 19 while attending UMBC, at which he hosted a monthly comedy showcase. During this period, he was active in the greater Maryland, Washington, D.C., and Virginia area and, in 2012, was named Baltimore's New Comedian of the Year.

He later moved to New York City, where he steadily made numerous radio and podcast guest appearances, as well as writing for and performing on Adult Swim, IFC, and MSG Network's People Talking Sports and Other Stuff (2017). During this period, he performed at venues like the New York Comedy Festival and opened for acts including Wham City, Tom Papa, and Robert Kelly. In 2019, he appeared in the Comedy Central stand-up series Comedy Central Stand Up Featuring, Life Fails, and Sex Fails.

Halkias came to prominence as a co-host of the cult-favorite comedy podcast Cum Town, which he co-hosted with Nick Mullen and Adam Friedland from 2016 until his departure in June 2022. The podcast had a cult-following and includes a large legacy fanbase.

An avid sports fan, he co-hosted White Chocolate NBA Pipecast with Adam Friedland during the 2017–2018 NBA season. From 2019 to 2022, he subsequently co-hosted the basketball podcast Pod Don't Lie with Sam Morril. Starting in 2020, he hosted a Twitch series Stavvy Solves Your Problems; in 2022, this series evolved into the podcast Stavvy's World.

=== 2022–present: Breakthrough and acting ===
In 2022, Halkias released his first comedy special, Live At The Lodge Room, on his YouTube channel, which reached 2 million views in three weeks. In January 2023, Halkias modeled and performed at a menswear and comedy show organized by designer Colm Dillane, also known as KidSuper, at the Casino de Paris.

His second special, Stavros Halkias: Fat Rascal, was released on Netflix in December 2023.

Halkias has become well known for his crowd work, often engaging actively with the audience and riffing on their stories and anecdotes. Many of his stand-up clips on his YouTube channel feature this practice. In 2023, he released a half-hour crowd-work-only comedy special, Four Nights In NYC.

In 2024, Halkias appeared in the Netflix series Tires. That same year, he had a minor role in the film Sweethearts, which was released on Max. He also made an appearance on the talk show John Mulaney Presents: Everybody's in LA. Additionally, he starred in the independent comedy film Let's Start a Cult, which he co-wrote with director Ben Kitnick and co-star Wes Haney.

In 2025, Halkias appeared as Officer Casey Boyd in Yorgos Lanthimos' film Bugonia. The film, also starring Emma Stone and Jesse Plemons, received several Academy Award nominations including Best Picture.

== Personal life ==
Halkias retains a close connection to Baltimore. He splits his time between there and New York City, keeping a home in Batimore's Canton neighborhood. His tour manager and podcast producer is his childhood best friend, Eldis Sula.

In American football and soccer, Halkias is a fan of the Baltimore Ravens and Olympiacos respectively.

Halkias cites his experiences during the COVID-19 pandemic as inspiration for his efforts at weight loss.

=== Religious views ===
Halkias was baptized in the Orthodox Church of Greece at nine-months-old.

In a 2024 podcast, he described himself as "heathenous" and "the least God-believing [person] in the world".

=== Political views ===
Since Cum Town, Halkias' humor and general content have marked him as having leftist beliefs. In the early 2020s, Halkias' involvement with Cum Town occasionally caused controversy, with criticism levied at the podcast's association with the dirtbag left. In 2025, Halkias appeared in a video with Zohran Mamdani to promote the latter's campaign in the 2025 New York City Democratic mayoral primary, which Mamdani later won.

In 2025, Halkias declined to perform at the Riyadh Comedy Festival.

== Filmography ==
=== Film ===
| Year | Title | Role | Notes | Ref. |
|---|---|---|---|---|
| 2014 | Call Girl of Cthulhu | Gill Waters | | |
| 2024 | Let's Start a Cult | Chip Harper | Also co-writer | |
| 2024 | Sweethearts | Airpods Guy | | |
| 2025 | Bugonia | Officer Casey Boyd | | |
| 2025 | Dance Freak | Megaman | | |
| 2026 | Tony | Stavros | | |
| 2027 | The Comeback King † | TBA | Post-production | |
| TBA | Thumb † | TBA | Post-production | |

=== Television ===
| Year | Title | Role | Notes |
|---|---|---|---|
| 2022 | Pause with Sam Jay | Party Guest | 1 episode |
| 2023 | Command Z | Baz Diamandis | 1 episode |
| 2024 | John Mulaney Presents: Everybody's in LA | Himself | 1 episode |
| 2024–present | Tires | Dave | Main cast |

=== Video games ===
| Year | Title | Role | Notes |
|---|---|---|---|
| 2026 | Grand Theft Auto VI | Dominic "The Brick" Brizzolato | Voice |

=== Comedy ===
| Year | Title | Notes |
|---|---|---|
| 2022 | Live at the Lodge Room | Stand-up special |
| 2023 | Four Nights In NYC | Half-hour stand-up special |
| 2023 | Stavros Halkias: Fat Rascal | Stand-up special |
| 2026 | Stavros Halkias: Uncle Stav | Stand-up special |

=== Podcasts ===
| Year | Title | Notes |
|---|---|---|
| 2016–2022 | Cum Town | |
| 2017–2018 | White Chocolate NBA Pipecast | |
| 2019–2022 | Pod Don't Lie | |
| 2020-2022 | Stavvy Solves Your Problems | |
| 2022–present | Stavvy's World | |
