= Adam Friedland =

American comedian and podcaster (born 1987)

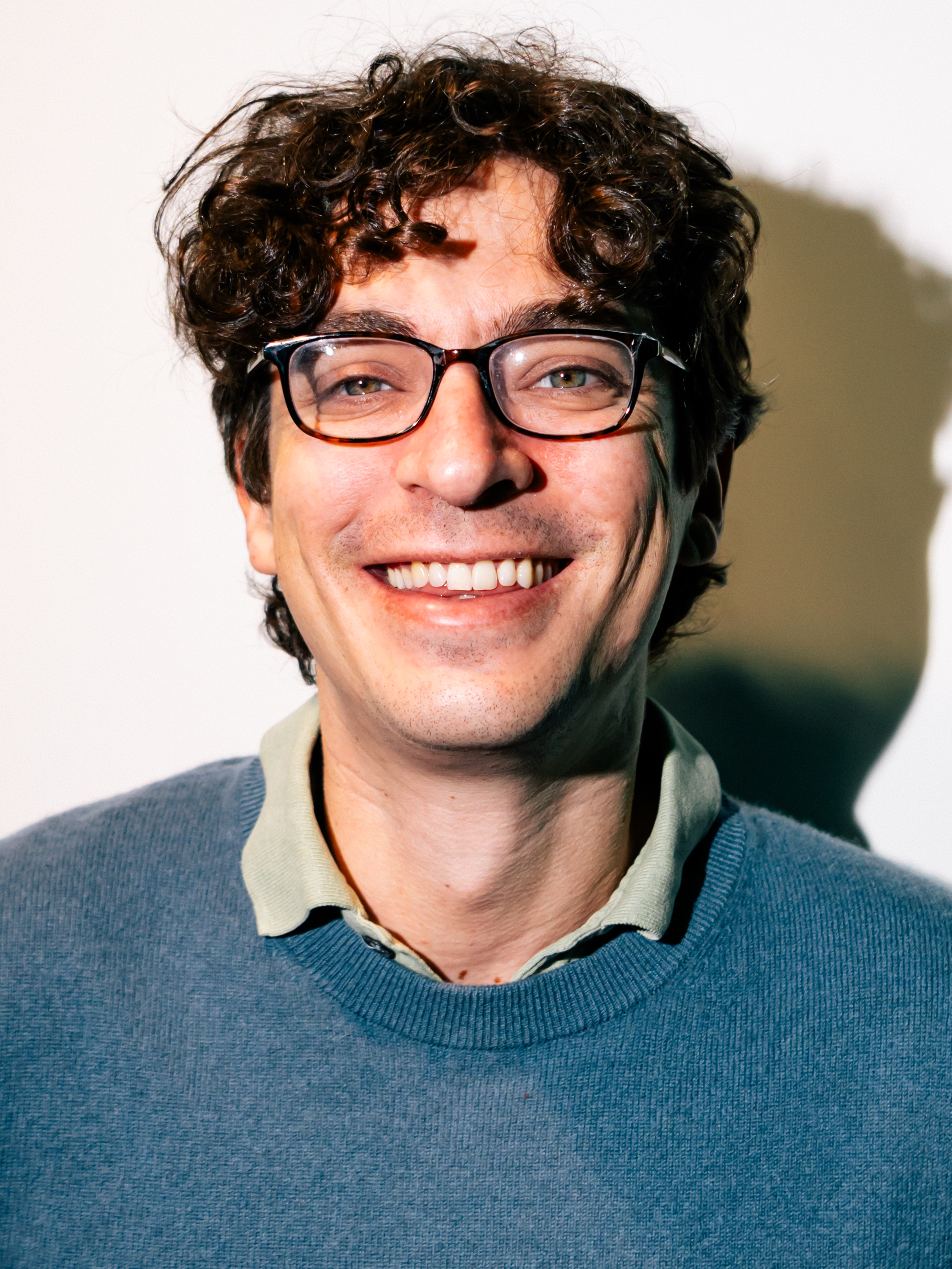
- Friedland in 2026
- Born: Adam Dean Friedland; April 10, 1987 (age 39); Santa Monica, California, U.S.
- Education: George Washington University (BA)
- Notable work: The Adam Friedland Show; Cum Town
- Spouse: Maia Lafortezza (m. 2026)
- Partner: Dasha Nekrasova (2018—2020)

Comedy career
- Years active: 2009–present
- Medium: Stand-up comedy; podcasts
- Genres: Observational comedy; black humor; blue humor; surreal humor; anti-humor; political satire; alternative comedy
- Subjects: Jewish culture; pop culture; American politics; everyday life
- Website: www.adamfriedland.com

Adam Dean Friedland (/ˈfriːdlænd/ FREED-land; born April 10, 1987) is an American stand-up comedian, talk-show host and podcaster. Described by GQ as a potential "Millennial Jon Stewart", he hosts the online comedy talk show The Adam Friedland Show, an offshoot of the comedy podcast Cum Town he co-hosted with Nick Mullen and Stavros Halkias.

== Early life ==
Adam Dean Friedland was born on April 10, 1987, at Saint John's Hospital in Santa Monica, California, to Lithuanian-Jewish South African parents from Cape Town; Max David Friedland, a former architect, and Joanne Friedland (née Leiserowitz). Max Friedland is the co-owner and publisher of David Magazine, along with Joanne Friedland who also served as the magazine's Advertising Director. Adam Friedland's sister, Zoë Friedland, is also an editor for David Magazine. The publication, launched in 2010, focuses on Jewish perspectives in the Las Vegas Valley.

Friedland's parents left South Africa in the early 1980s after his father received a draft notice to fight in the Angolan Civil War. Adam grew up in California, South Africa, and Las Vegas. Following high school, Friedland lived in Israel for a year where he worked in the ambulance service. Friedland attended George Washington University as a Middle Eastern studies major and intended to pursue a legal career.

== Career ==
Friedland began his comedy career in Washington, D.C., following his college graduation and deferment from law school in 2009. He formerly worked as a paralegal for Vox Media for two-and-a-half months. For the following two-and-a-half years, he helped run the DIY venue Subterranean A, which hosted the likes of musical artists Radical Face, Tennis, Secret Society, and comedy acts James Adomian and Wham City.

He hosted a number of comedy shows, first at Subterranean A and then other venues in the city, gaining notability in the scene for his 'alternative' performance piece–oriented comedy. He also aided in the live series You, Me, Them, Everybody. Friedland hosted the alternative comedy show Funny Moms, which originated in Washington, D.C., in 2012 with co-host Sara Starmour.In 2013 and 2014, he performed at the Bentzen Ball comedy festival and was named in the annual "Best of D.C." list by the Washington City Paper. He moved to New York City in 2014.

In 2016, Friedland joined Nick Mullen and Stavros Halkias as co-host of the comedy podcast Cum Town. The podcast is noted for its absurdist and controversial content. He also co-hosted the sports podcast White Chocolate NBA Pipecast with Halkias from 2017 to 2018. In January 2018, he appeared on i24 News to discuss the decline of support for Israel among young American Jews. He was a guest on The Michael Brooks Show and is a recurring guest on Chapo Trap House.

After the end of the Cum Town podcast, Mullen and Friedland began the The Adam Friedland Show, an interview format podcast. Mullen left the podcast to pursue alternative projects, and Friedland continues to host the podcast. Interviewees include musicians, actors, podcasters and politicians; although the show is not described as political. The show is available on YouTube, and features a series of studio musicians, TAFS Unplugged. In November 2026, he was considered one of Variety's ten comics to look out for in 2026.

== Personal life ==
Friedland is Jewish. He lives in New York City. He is a lifelong supporter of Arsenal F.C. Friedland owned a rescue dog named Isis who passed away in 2026 after being diagnosed with a neuromuscular condition. Friedland's mother, Joanne, died in 2020. From 2018 to 2020, he was in a relationship with podcaster Dasha Nekrasova. On September 26th, 2026, Friedland married Maia Lafortezza.

=== Politics ===
Friedland voted for Vermont senator Bernie Sanders in his 2016 and 2020 presidential campaigns. He is opposed to Zionism, which he credits to an experience at 19 years old seeing Palestinian living conditions in the West Bank in comparison to those of Israeli settlers in the area, which he described as "inhumane".

== Works ==
Shows

- The Adam Friedland Show (2022–present)

Podcasts

- Cum Town (2016–2022)
- White Chocolate NBA Pipecast (2017–2018)
- The Beautiful Pod with Chris Ryan (2026)
