= List of Chapo Trap House episodes (2016–2020) =

== Episodes ==
=== 2016 ===
No. overall	Given No. (Note: Chapo Trap House episodes are given an official number, including ".5" numbering used for early premium episodes and unnumbered "bonus" episodes. The "given number" column shows the episode numbers designated in the show title, while the "number overall" column reflects the total number of all episodes.)	Title	Guests	Original release date	Notes
1	1	"THA SAGA BEGINS"	—	March 13, 2016	—
2	2	"We Need to Talk About Kevin (a.k.a. Enta the Dungeon)"	—	March 19, 2016	—
3	3	"Freeway Ross Douthat Sailboat Dope"	Brendan James	March 27, 2016	—
4	4	"Bernie Blanco From the Bronx"	—	April 3, 2016	Brendan James joins as producer
5	5	"What's So Civil About the Civil War Anyway?"	Carl Beijer	April 10, 2016	—
6	6	"Batman vs. Superman: Dawn of Justice & Development"	Matt V. Brady	April 17, 2016	Review of the film Batman v Superman: Dawn of Justice
7	7	"The Prince & the Egg: An Anil Dash Adventure"	—	April 24, 2016	—
8	8	"Children of Bruen"	Liz Bruenig	May 1, 2016	—
9	9	"Trump Stakes or Election 2016: The Age of Apocalypse"	—	May 8, 2016	—
10	10	"No FoPo, Fight the Blob"	Derek Davison	May 15, 2016	—
11	10.5	"Doctor Faustus"	—	May 18, 2016	Premium
12	11	"Cranking the Donkey"	Matt Taibbi	May 22, 2016	—
13	11.5	"The French Vasectomy"	—	May 25, 2016	Premium
14	12	"Love That Ron"	Virgil Texas	May 29, 2016	—
15	12.5	"Eyes Wide Cuck"	—	June 1, 2016	Premium
16	13	"Justified But Woke"	Connor Kilpatrick	June 6, 2016	—
17	14	"Chillin' In Cedar Rapids Iowa"	—	June 13, 2016	—
18	15	"Alligator Tears"	Roqayah Chammseddine	June 16, 2016	Premium
19	16	"The Male Female Radio Hour"	Lee Fang	June 20, 2016	—
20	17	"The Road to Soavedom"	Robby Soave	June 25, 2016	Premium
21	18	"The Upset Guv'ner: DeCrecio's Brexit Bungle"	Jonathan Shanin	June 26, 2016	—
22	19	"Boobs, Sir, I Punched the Bursar"	—	June 30, 2016	Premium
23	20	"Chapo vs. Sherdog: UFC 2000"	Jordan Breen	July 5, 2016	—
24	21	"Oaxaca Flocka Flame"	Tony (@MexicAnarchist)	July 8, 2016	Premium
25	22	"The Trap Is A MESS"	Vic Berger	July 11, 2016	—
26	23	"Reign All Over My Face"	—	July 14, 2016	Premium; review of the film Reign Over Me
27	24	"Gulens Gonna Gulen"	Derek Davison	July 18, 2016	Davison's 2nd episode
28	25	"Lady Ghostbusters"	Amber A'Lee Frost	July 24, 2016	Premium; review of the film Ghostbusters (2016)
29	26	"ReTHUGlican National CRIMEvention"	Bryan Quinby	July 25, 2016	—
30	27	"Tomorrow Belongs to Them"	Dan O'Sullivan	July 30, 2016	—
31	28	"Chapo Comes Alive!"	Bryan Quinby and Brett Payne	August 3, 2016	Premium; live show; Quinby's 2nd episode
32	29	"London Falling"	Sam Kriss	August 3, 2016	Premium; review of the film London Has Fallen
33	30	"Freeway Ross Douthat Pt. 2: The Harvard Plug"	Brendan James	August 5, 2016	James' 2nd episode
34	31	"Brooklyn Tyrannical Gardens"	—	August 11, 2016	Premium
35	32	"Suicide Is Shameless"	Matt V. Brady	August 15, 2016	Brady's 2nd episode; review of the DCEU film Suicide Squad
36	33	"The Uncucking of the Candidate"	Libby Watson	August 18, 2016	Premium
37	34	"Masculinity for Boys"	—	August 22, 2016	—
38	35	"Bloodlands"	Adrian Bonenberger	August 25, 2016	Premium
39	36	"Dear Gulen"	Liza Featherstone	August 29, 2016	—
40	37	"Teen Party"	Brandon Wardell	September 1, 2016	Premium
41	38	"Elevator to Heaven"	Maria Hengevald	September 5, 2016	—
42	39	"The Conqueror"	Derek Davison	September 9, 2016	Premium; Davison's 3rd episode; review of the film The Conqueror
43	40	"Sborts Night"	Greg Howard	September 12, 2016	—
44	41	"Smash"	Alex Nichols (@Lowenaffchen)	September 16, 2016	Premium; review of the film Crash (2004)
45	42	"Uber for Ubermensch"	Ed Zitron and Noah Kulwin	September 18, 2016	—
46	43	"ElfQuest"	—	September 22, 2016	Premium
47	44	"The Gowanus Ideas Festival"	Virgil Texas and Sam Kriss	September 26, 2016	Texas and Kriss' 2nd episodes, live show
48	45	"Cath Bash"	—	October 1, 2016	Premium
49	46	"No Cucks in the Foxhole"	James Adomian	October 4, 2016	—
TBA	TBA	"Bonus Treat - Knowledge God"	—	October 6, 2016	Premium
50	47	"I Am Legend"	Francis (@ArmyStrang)	October 6, 2016	Premium
51	48	"A Problem from Heck"	Chase Madar	October 9, 2016	—
52	49	"Caleb"	—	October 12, 2016	Premium
53	50	"AKP 50th Episode Ergenekon Extravaganza"	Matt Karp	October 17, 2016	—
54	51	"The Post Officers"	Katherine Krueger	October 19, 2016	Premium
55	52	"Dirty Wars 2: Rise of McRaven"	Jeremy Scahill	October 23, 2016	—
56	53	"The French Resistance"	Alexander Zaitchik	October 26, 2016	Premium
57	54	"Trap House of Horror: The Hanging Boyz"	Kath Barbadoro	October 30, 2016	—
58	55	"The Chapofication of the Western Male"	—	November 2, 2016	Premium
59	56	"Under Siege Year 3: Before Year Zero"	Brendan James	November 7, 2016	James' 3rd episode
60	57	"Chapo News Network Election Night Live Show"	Virgil Texas	November 8, 2016	Texas' 3rd episode; live show
61	58	"We Live in the Zone Now"	Virgil Texas	November 12, 2016	Texas' 4th episode
62	59	"Tell Your God to Ready for Chud"	Matt Karp and Connor Kilpatrick	November 17, 2016	Premium, Karp and Kilpatrick's 2nd episode, Amber Frost and Virgil Texas join as co-hosts
63	60	"Off-Off-Broadway"	Erin Gloria Ryan	November 20, 2016	—
64	61	"Who Makes the Nazis?"	Trevor Beaulieu (credited as Ricky Rawls)	November 24, 2016	—
65	62	"Chapo Struggle Session"	—	November 30, 2016	Premium
66	62.5	"Felix After Dark"	—	December 3, 2016	Premium; Biederman solo episode
67	63	"SuccessFail: The McMegan Story"	Ezekiel Kweku	December 4, 2016	—
68	64	"Candyman IV: Curse of Caleb"	Katie Halper	December 8, 2016	Premium
69	65	"No Future"	Adam Curtis	December 11, 2016	Discussion of the film HyperNormalisation
70	66	"Pizza Party!"	Jacob Bacharach	December 16, 2016	Premium
71	67	"The Swordfish Episode"	—	December 17, 2016	—
72	67.5	"The Inebriated Past"	—	December 21, 2016	Premium; Christman solo episode
73	68	"Applebees Christmas Spectacular"	Kath Barbadoro	December 23, 2016	Barbadoro's 2nd episode
74	69	"Angela & Strawberry"	James Adomian	December 29, 2016	Adomian's 2nd episode

=== 2017 ===
No. overall	Given No.	Title	Guests	Original release date	Notes
75	70	"Real Strain Hours"	Libby Watson	January 4, 2017	Premium; Watson's 2nd episode
76	71	"Crapo Cat House: The Half-Lost Episode"	Alex Nichols	January 9, 2017	Nichols' 2nd episode
77	72	"The Pre-Taped Call-In Show"	—	January 13, 2017	Premium
78	73	"Better Call Saul Alinsky"	Bill Corbett	January 15, 2017	Review of the film Hillary's America: The Secret History of the Democratic Party
79	74	"Tabletop Game Theory Pt. 1"	—	January 18, 2017	Premium, later released as free
80	75	"Mr. Chapo Goes to Washington"	Sam Kriss	January 22, 2017	Kriss' 3rd episode
81	76	"Tabletop Game Theory Pt. 2"	—	January 24, 2017	Premium, later released as free
82	77	"No Country for Gorilla Men"	Matt Taibbi	January 29, 2017	Taibbi's 2nd episode
83	78	"Terminal"	—	January 31, 2017	Premium
84	78.5	"Mixed Martial Law"	Karim Zadan	February 2, 2017	Premium; Biederman's 2nd solo episode
85	79	"Our Values Are Under Attack"	Tim Heidecker	February 6, 2017	—
86	80	"Kolob Trap House"	Adam Friedland	February 9, 2017	Premium
87	81	"The Devil In Mother Jones"	Shane Bauer	February 12, 2017	—
88	82	"War Is Heck"	Brace Belden	February 13, 2017	—
89	83	"Boston Skrong"	—	February 15, 2017	Premium; review of the film Patriots Day
90	84	"President Wario"	—	February 19, 2017	—
91	85	"The Appropriaters"	Shuja Haider	February 22, 2017	Premium
92	86	"Fash the Patriarchy"	Angela Nagle	February 26, 2017	—
93	87	"The Basketball Snob"	—	March 2, 2017	Premium
94	88	"Sebastian Goku"	Derek Davison	March 5, 2017	Davison's 4th episode
95	89	"Napoleanic Rules for Success"	@Trillburne	March 10, 2017	Premium; review of the film The Duellists
96	90	"Gorka's Revenge"	James Adomian (as Sebastian Gorka)	March 12, 2017	Adomian's 3rd episode
97	91	"The Lasagne Code"	Leon Chang (@leyawn)	March 17, 2017	Premium
98	92	"No. 1 in Heaven"	—	March 20, 2017	—
99	93	"Madness? THIS IS CHAPO"	—	March 23, 2017	Premium; review of the film 300
100	94	"The Brian Johnstown Massacre"	Jacob Bacharach	March 26, 2017	Bacharach's 2nd episode
101	95	"Hillbilly Smellegy"	Matt Sitman	March 30, 2017	Premium
102	96	"Night At The Museum"	Tim Heidecker (as Alex Jones)	April 2, 2017	Heidecker's 2nd episode
103	97	"Hollywood Upstairs Medical College"	Timothy "T-Bone" Faust	April 6, 2017	Premium; later released as free
104	98	"Gorka II: The Gorkaning"	Alex Pareene and James Adomian (as Sebastian Gorka)	April 9, 2017	Adomian's 4th episode
105	99	"Taxi To the Dark Side"	Adam Friedland	April 13, 2017	Premium; Friedland's 2nd episode
106	100	"Chapo Goes To College"	Timothy "T-Bone" Faust	April 17, 2017	Live at Harvard University; Faust's 2nd episode
107	101	"Post Hoc, Ergo Propter Hoc"	—	April 19, 2017	Premium; review of the TV series The West Wing
108	102	"Maintaining Emotional Control"	Rob Delaney	April 23, 2017	—
109	103	"Décision Désk La France"	James Adomian	April 26, 2017	Premium; Adomian's 5th episode
110	104	"We've Always Been Here"	—	April 30, 2017	Live show; benefit for the Center for Reproductive Rights on April 27, 2017, at Littlefield NYC
111	105	"The Grey Ladykillers"	—	May 4, 2017	Premium
112	106	"Work No Play"	Timothy "T-Bone" Faust and Miya Tokumitsu	May 7, 2017	Faust's 3rd episode
113	107	"Fight Club"	Karim Zidan	May 10, 2017	Premium; Zidan's 2nd episode
114	108	"Night On Bald Mountain"	Matt Bruenig	May 14, 2017	—
115	109	"Media Twatters"	Libby Watson	May 19, 2017	Premium; Watson's 3rd episode
116	110	"The Rocktober Revolution"	China Miéville	May 22, 2017	—
117	111	"The Goddamn Freaking News"	—	May 24, 2017	Premium; review of the TV series The Newsroom
118	112	"Orbsplainer"	David Cross	May 25, 2017	—
119	113	"Hit and Run"	R.L. Stephens	June 1, 2017	Premium; later released as free
120	114	"Meat The Press"	Alex Nichols	June 4, 2017	Nichols' 3rd episode
121	114.5	"God Save Our Jezza"	Jonathan Shainin	June 6, 2017	Shainin's 2nd episode; special episode dedicated to the UK Election
122	115	"Austin Shitty Limits"	Brian Gaar	June 7, 2017	Premium
123	115.5	"Chapo Global Edition: You Down With GCC?"	Derek Davison	June 8, 2017	Premium; Davison's 5th episode
124	116	"Jezz In My Pants"	—	June 12, 2017	—
125	117	"Kill All Nermals"	Angela Nagle	June 14, 2017	Premium; Nagle's 2nd episode
126	118	"From Russia With CHUD"	Sarah Jones	June 18, 2017	—
127	118.5	"The Inebriated Past: Sewer Surfin'"	—	June 21, 2017	Premium; Christman's 2nd solo episode
128	119	"Bating For Gadot"	—	June 25, 2017	Review of the film Wonder Woman
129	120	"Fearless Girlilla Mindset"	—	June 28, 2017	Premium
130	121	"These Things I Believe"	—	July 4, 2017	—
131	122	"The Virgin Suicides"	Adam Friedland	July 6, 2017	Premium; Friedland's 3rd episode
132	123	"UBIsoft"	Clio Chang	July 10, 2017	—
133	124	"Gabagool"	—	July 13, 2017	Premium
134	125	"Fast And Furious: Toledo Drifter"	Tim Heidecker	July 15, 2017	Heidecker's 3rd episode
135	126	"Tabletop Game Theory Pt. III: The Russian Interference"	—	July 19, 2017	Premium, later released as free
136	127	"Dr. Dementia"	Trevor Beaulieu (credited as Ricky Rawls)	July 23, 2017	Beaulieu's 2nd episode
137	128	"Tabletop Game Theory Pt. IV: The Russian Interference"	—	July 26, 2017	Premium, later released as free
138	129	"The Affordable Covfefe Act"	Timothy "T-Bone" Faust	July 30, 2017	Faust's 4th episode
139	130	"The Milk People"	Libby Watson	August 4, 2017	Premium; Watson's 4th episode
140	131	"Deep Dish Chapo: Live @ The Hideout"	Josh Androsky	August 9, 2017	Premium; live show recorded in Chicago on August 6, 2017
141	131.5	"Bonus Deep Dish Chapo: Live @ The Hideout"	Bryan Quinby and Brett Payne	August 12, 2017	Premium; Quinby's 3rd episode; Payne's 2nd episode; live show recorded in Chicago on August 6, 2017
142	132	"Bloco's Modern Life"	Marcus Barnett, Catarina Príncipe, and Djordje Kuzmanovic	August 12, 2017	—
143	133	"Antifap"	Shuja Haider	August 18, 2017	Premium, later released as free; Haider's 2nd episode
144	134	"Memento Maury"	Joe Mande	August 20, 2017	—
145	135	"Barron Protectors"	Leslie Lee	August 23, 2017	Premium
146	136	"Lullaby For Lanyards"	Joe Prince	August 27, 2017	—
147	137	"HUMINT Centipede"	—	August 29, 2017	Premium
148	138	"Verrit Carefully"	Alex Nichols	September 5, 2017	Nichols' 4th episode
149	139	"Enter The Noid"	—	September 7, 2017	Premium
150	140	"DACA Flocka Flame"	Karina Moreno	September 9, 2017	—
151	141	"Chapo Cartoon Cavalcade"	—	September 14, 2017	Premium
152	142	"The Schlock Doctrine"	Naomi Klein	September 17, 2017	—
153	143	"Splattering of the Juggalos"	—	September 21, 2017	Premium
154	144	"White Men Can't Drumpf"	—	September 24, 2017	—
155	145	"Return of the Blob"	Derek Davison	September 28, 2017	Premium; Davison's 6th episode
156	146	"Better Ingredients, Better Healthcare, Chapo Johns"	Timothy "T-Bone" Faust	October 1, 2017	Faust's 5th episode
157	147	"Gun Kata"	—	October 5, 2017	Premium
158	148	"Lost In The Sauce"	Patton Oswalt	October 9, 2017	—
159	149	"Live @ The Biltmore Hotel"	James Adomian	October 12, 2017	Premium; Adomian's 6th episode; live recording from LA Podfest on October 6, 2017
160	150	"Get Kony"	Tim Heidecker	October 14, 2017	Heidecker's 4th episode
161	151	"Cass Rules Everything Around Me"	—	October 19, 2017	Premium
162	152	"Iran Off On the Plug Twice"	—	October 22, 2017	—
163	153	"Dry Goys"	Eli Valley	October 26, 2017	Premium
164	154	"Listening Tour"	—	October 30, 2017	—
165	155	"The Antifa Treason And Plot"	Will Sommer	November 2, 2017	Premium
166	156	"38 Ways to Fix Puerto Rico"	Aída Chávez	November 6, 2017	—
167	156.5	"I'd Rather Be Salman"	Derek Davison	November 8, 2017	Premium; Davison's 7th episode
168	157	"Brazile Nuts"	David Roth	November 9, 2017	Premium
169	158	"Double Flynndemnity"	—	November 13, 2017	—
170	159	"Gentleman Ben Franklin"	Bill Corbett	November 16, 2017	Premium; Corbett's 2nd episode; review of the film In Search of Liberty
171	160	"Live at the Bell House"	—	November 16, 2017	Recorded live at Brooklyn Pod Fest at The Bell House on November 17, 2017
172	161	"Gladiator Boy"	—	November 25, 2017	Premium
173	162	"Arab Spring Breakers"	James Adomian (as Sebastian Gorka)	November 28, 2017	Adomian's 7th episode; Biederman's 3rd solo episode
174	163	"Motherbox XXX (The Justice League Episode)"	—	November 29, 2017	Premium; review of the film Justice League
175	164	"The Deficit Rag"	—	December 4, 2017	—
176	165	"New York State of Mindfulness"	Mike Recine	December 6, 2017	Premium
177	166	"The Water Genious [sic]"	Nomiki Konst	December 10, 2017	—
178	167	"The Poop Touchening"	Matt Bruenig and Ryan Cooper	December 14, 2017	Premium; Matt Bruenig's 2nd episode
179	168	"Nut Neutrality"	Sam Seder	December 17, 2017	—
180	169	"Alternative Failson Tax"	—	December 20, 2017	Premium
181	170	"A Christman Carol"	James Adomian (as Chris Matthews and Sebastian Gorka), Brendan James, Rob Whisman, and Stefan Heck	December 24, 2017	Christmas special; parody of A Christmas Carol; Adomian's 8th episode; James' 4th episode
182	171	"The Way of the Shadow Wolves"	—	December 28, 2017	Premium
183	172	"So It's Come To This..."	Brendan James	December 31, 2017	Clip show; James departs as series producer in his 5th episode

=== 2018 ===
No. overall	Given No.	Title	Guests	Original release date	Notes
184	173	"Pontypool Chapos Everything"	—	January 3, 2018	Premium; Chris Wade joins as the series producer
185	174	"Ooohh Baby I Like It Raw"	—	January 7, 2018	—
186	175	"The Dark Professor"	Shuja Haider	January 9, 2018	Premium; Haider's 3rd episode
187	176	"Any Port In a Stormy"	Alex Pareene	January 13, 2018	Pareene's 2nd episode
188	177	"The News Queen"	Brendan James	January 17, 2018	Premium; review of the film The Post; James' 6th episode
189	178	"Government Nutdown"	—	January 22, 2018	—
190	179	"The Inebriated Past Part 3: SDS and the Weather Underground"	—	January 25, 2018	Premium; Christman's 3rd solo episode
191	180	"D Triple C 6 Mafia"	Ryan Grim	January 28, 2018	—
192	—	"Bonus: Virgil Interviews Kaniela Ing"	Kaniela Ing	January 31, 2018	—
193	181	"Potus6ix9ine"	—	February 2, 2018	Premium
194	182	"Soup or Bowl?"	—	February 5, 2018	—
195	183	"GlenGreenwald Glen Ross"	Glenn Greenwald	February 7, 2018	Premium
196	184	"The United States of Care Lords"	Dino Guastella	February 11, 2018	—
197	185	"Own Your Own Immigrant!"	—	February 15, 2018	Premium
198	186	"Executive Producer"	Richard D. Wolff	February 18, 2018	—
199	187	"Mumsnet"	Marcus Barnett	February 21, 2018	Premium; Barnett's 2nd episode
200	188	"Menaker Facts Stated"	Daniel Menaker	February 25, 2018	—
201	189	"All That Is Solid Melts Into Sauce"	Patton Oswalt	February 27, 2018	Premium; Oswalt's 2nd episode
202	190	"School's Out"	Michael Mochaidean	March 4, 2018	—
203	191	"The Shape of Whiffen"	David Cross	March 7, 2018	Premium; Cross' 2nd episode
204	192	"Spice World"	Jacob Bacharach	March 10, 2018	Bacharach's 3rd episode
205	193	"AIPAC: All Eyez On Me"	Noah Kulwin	March 15, 2018	Premium; Kulwin's 2nd episode
206	193.5	"Break Up Rex"	Derek Davison	March 17, 2018	Premium; Davison's 8th episode
207	194	"F*ck 12"	Shuja Haider and James Adomian (as Elon Musk)	March 18, 2018	Shuja's 4th episode; Adomian's 9th episode
208	195	"Frost/Christman: Marx and the Movies"	—	March 22, 2018	Premium; review of the films The Young Karl Marx and The Death of Stalin
209	196	"Crazy Joe's Folly"	—	March 26, 2018	—
210	197	"The YIMBY Failing Project"	Shanti Singh	March 28, 2018	Premium
211	198	"Asked & Answered"	—	April 3, 2018	—
212	199	"Ready Chapo One"	Matt V. Brady	April 5, 2018	Premium; Brady's 3rd episode; review of the film Ready Player One
213	200	"The Jeffrey Goldberg Variations"	James Adomian (as Kurt Eichenwald)	April 9, 2018	Adomian's 10th episode
214	201	"The Social Networth"	Libby Watson	April 12, 2018	Premium; Watson's 5th episode
215	202	"Sgt. Anne Marie Slaughter"	Dan Finn and Eric Blanc	April 15, 2018	—
216	203	"The Truth About Cats & Syria"	John Dolan	April 19, 2018	Premium
217	204	"Comey the Clown"	Katherine Krueger	April 23, 2018	Krueger's 2nd episode
218	—	"Bonus: Virgil Interviews Dan Canon"	Dan Canon	April 24, 2018	—
219	205	"The Energy Shiftening"	Will Sommer and James Adomian (as QAnon)	April 27, 2018	Premium; Adomian's 11th episode, Sommer's 2nd episode
220	—	"Bonus: Virgil Interviews Geneviéve Jones-Wright"	Geneviéve Jones-Wright	April 30, 2018	—
221	206	"Dry Boys Ride Again"	—	May 1, 2018	—
222	207	"Law And Ordurrrr"	—	May 3, 2018	Premium
223	208	"Donnie's World Tour"	Derek Davison	May 6, 2018	Davison's 9th episode
224	209	"Death Becomes You"	Barbara Ehrenreich	May 9, 2018	Premium
225	210	"ICE to See You"	Jake Flores	May 13, 2018	—
226	211	"Sergeant Hands"	—	May 17, 2018	Premium; review of the film 12 Strong: The Declassified True Story of the Horse Soldiers
227	212	"Borderline"	Brendan James	May 21, 2018	James' 7th episode
228	—	"Bonus: Matt and Mike Duncan Talk 'Revolutions'"	Mike Duncan	May 23, 2018	—
229	213	"In Conclusion, Palestine is a Land of Contrasts"	Rawan (@intifadarling)	May 23, 2018	Premium
230	214	"6 Weird Election Tricks That ACTUALLY Work!"	David Faris	May 27, 2018	—
231	215	"Patriots, Pragmatists & PissPigs"	—	May 31, 2018	Premium
232	216	"First Time, Long Time"	PFT Commenter	June 3, 2018	—
233	217	"Feeling Q and Sad rn"	—	June 7, 2018	Premium
234	218	"The President's Neck Is Missing"	David Roth	June 10, 2018	Roth's 2nd episode
235	219	"Da r@ntZ0ne"	Alex Nichols	June 15, 2018	Premium; Nichols' 5th episode
236	220	"Camp Donald"	Libby Watson and James Adomian (as Jesse Ventura)	June 17, 2018	Adomian's 12th episode, Watson's 6th episode
237	221	"M. Night Shyamalan's The Villages"	Osita Nwanevu	June 21, 2018	Premium
238	222	"RESPECT."	Adam Friedland and Mike Recine	June 24, 2018	Friedland's 4th episode, Recine's 2nd episode; review of the film Gotti
239	—	"Bonus – Felix interviews Tarpley Hitt"	Tarpley Hitt	June 25, 2018	Premium; discussion of rapper XXXTentacion
240	223	"Fight Court"	—	June 27, 2018	Premium
241	—	"BONUS – Behind the Laughter: Mike Reiss"	Mike Reiss	June 29, 2018	—
242	224	"Cortez the Killer"	Trevor Beaulieu and Katherine Krueger	July 2, 2018	Beaulieu's 3rd episode (previously credited as Ricky Rawls or T.); Krueger's 3rd episode
243	225	"The Poster's Crusade"	—	July 6, 2018	Premium; review of the book Yes We (Still) Can by Daniel Pfeiffer; later released as free
244	226	"Islands in the Stream"	—	July 9, 2018	—
245	—	"Bonus: Virgil Interviews Julia Salazar, LIVE!"	Julia Salazar	July 10, 2018	—
246	227	"PEN 15"	—	July 11, 2018	Premium; review of the film Range 15
247	—	"Bonus: Chris talks to Occupy ICE Portland"	Jordan, activist in Portland, Oregon	July 12, 2018	—
248	228	"Supreme Clientele"	Ashley Feinberg and James Adomian (as Elon Musk)	July 15, 2018	Adomian's 13th episode
249	—	"Bonus: SEX! Now that we have your attention: Work"	Tai and Conner Habib	July 17, 2018	—
250	229	"Double A *beep beep* M L O!"	Karina Moreno and Brendan James (as "guest cohost")	July 19, 2018	Premium; Moreno's 2nd episode, James' 8th episode
251	230	"A Colossal Wreck"	—	July 22, 2018	—
252	231	"Quiz Boys"	Michael Kupperman	July 25, 2018	Premium
253	232	"America, You Sexy Bigfoot!"	—	July 30, 2018	—
254	233	"Frost/Christman Presents: The Purges"	Kal (Note: A friend of Frost's credited only as Kal.) and Aaron J. Leonard	August 1, 2018	Premium; review of The Purge films
255	234	"Congrat's"	—	August 5, 2018	—
256	235	"Q Let the Dogs Out?"	Will Sommer	August 10, 2018	Premium; Sommer's 3rd episode
257	236	"Space Force: Mobile Infantry"	—	August 13, 2018	—
258	237	"Our Cool Friends"	Derek Davison	August 16, 2018	Premium; Davison's 10th appearance
259	—	"Bonus: Interview with Parquet Courts' A. Savage"	A. Savage (of the band Parquet Courts)	August 18, 2018	—
260	238	"The Mueller's Tale"	—	August 20, 2018	—
261	—	"Bonus: Chris Talks to Stonybrook Apartments Activists"	Crystal (head of the Stonybrook Tenant Association) and Grant (of the Palm Beach County Tenants Union)	August 23, 2018	—
262	239	"Fact Fight"	Matt Bruenig	August 24, 2018	Premium; Matt Bruenig's 3rd episode
263	240	"The Shittalk Express"	—	August 27, 2018	—
264	241	"Hot Couch Nation"	Stavros Halkias and Matt V. Brady	August 30, 2018	Premium; Brady's 4th episode
265	242	"Touched by a Funeral"	—	September 3, 2018	—
266	243	"Live at DC's 9:30 Club"	—	September 7, 2018	Premium; recorded live at the 9:30 Club on September 6, 2018
267	—	"Bonus: Virgil interviews Cynthia Nixon"	Cynthia Nixon	September 10, 2018	—
268	244	"A Nice Chill Show"	—	September 11, 2018	—
269	245	"Inebriated Past 5: Monster Fash"	—	September 13, 2018	Premium; Christman's 4th solo episode
270	246	"Best of New England Live, Part 1"	—	September 18, 2018	Excerpts from live shows in Boston, Massachusetts, and Hamden, Connecticut
271	246	"Best of New England Live, Part 2"	—	September 19, 2018	Excerpts from live shows at the Bell House in Brooklyn, NY and The Met in Pawtucket, RI.
272	247	"Mayans, M.C."	Bryan Quinby	September 20, 2018	Premium; Quinby's 4th episode; review of the TV series Mayans M.C.
273	248	"Too Many Bretts"	—	September 24, 2018	—
274	249	"The Kneeling Drunkard's Plea"	Dave Anthony	September 28, 2018	Premium
275	250	"Big Dickinson Energy"	Alena Smith	October 1, 2018	—
276	251	"Sonic Reductionism"	Briahna Joy Gray	October 6, 2018	Premium
277	252	"Rod Dreher's The Exorcist"	Bryan Quinby and Brett Payne	October 9, 2018	Payne's 3rd episode, Quinby's 5th episode; features excerpts of live show recorded at Mr. Small's in Pittsburgh, Pennsylvania, on October 8, 2018
278	253	"Full Goop Mode"	—	October 12, 2018	Premium
279	254	"Best of the Midwest: Columbus & Chicago"	Bryan Quinby and Brett Payne	October 15, 2018	Payne's 4th episode, Quinby 's 6th episode; features excerpts of live shows recorded October 10, 2018 at the Anthenaeum Theater in Columbus, Ohio, and October 14, 2018 at the House of Blues in Chicago, Illinois
280	255	"Best of the Midwest: Mostly Minneapolis"	—	October 20, 2018	Premium; later released as free
281	256	"Ass, Grass or Sasse"	—	October 22, 2018	–
282	257	"Public Banking"	Josh Androsky and James Adomian (as Bernie Sanders)	October 25, 2018	Premium; Androsky's 2nd episode; Adomian's 14th episode
283	—	"Bonus: Brazil"	Ben Fogel	October 26, 2018	—
284	258	"Lesko's Lament"	—	October 29, 2018	—
285	259	"The D'Souzaverse: Soros Rising"	—	November 1, 2018	Premium; review of the film Death of a Nation: Can We Save America a Second Time?
286	260	"Wonk The Pain Away: An Election Special"	Will Sommer	November 4, 2018	Sommer's 4th episode
287	—	"Bonus: Ham Man Bad"	—	November 5, 2018	Live reading of Scott Walker's book Unintimidated at the Barrymore Theatre in Madison, Wisconsin
288	261	"Teen Party II"	Brandon Wardell and Jack Wagner	November 8, 2018	Premium; Wardell's 2nd episode
289	262	"Blood and Cheesecake"	—	November 12, 2018	—
290	263	"Who Defines the Definers?"	—	November 15, 2018	Premium
291	—	"Bonus: Chris Discusses the U.S. Navy Bombing of the Mariana Islands"	—	November 16, 2018	—
292	264	"The Golden Ones"	Natalie Wynn	November 18, 2018	—
293	265	"Thanksgiving Dinar"	—	November 21, 2018	Premium
294	—	"Chris Talks Hurricane Relief & Disaster Socialism With Tallahassee DSA"	—	November 25, 2018	—
295	266	"Rod Friended Me"	James Adomian (as Andrew Cuomo)	November 27, 2018	Adomian's 15th episode
296	267	"Eric the Bewitched"	—	November 29, 2018	Premium
297	268	"Condom Depot Presents: Fighting in the Age of Horniness"	Jon Bois	December 2, 2018	—
298	—	"Bonus: Virgil interviews Yanis Varoufakis"	Yanis Varoufakis	December 6, 2018	—
299	269	"Live at Princeton: Master Debaters"	—	December 7, 2018	Premium; excerpt of live show at Princeton University
300	270	"Beto Males"	Liz Bruenig	December 10, 2018	Liz Bruenig's 2nd episode
301	271	"Hollow Men"	Libby Watson	December 13, 2018	Premium; Watson's 7th episode
302	272	"The Butterfly Effect"	—	December 18, 2018	—
303	273	"Momoa, No Problems"	—	December 21, 2018	Premium; review of the film Aquaman
304	274	"It's A Willderful Life"	James Adomian (as Bernie Sanders), Katherine Krueger, Adam Friedland, Stavros Halkias and Nick Mullen	December 24, 2018	Christmas special; parody of It's A Wonderful Life; Adomian's 16th episode, Krueger's 4th episode, Friedland's 5th episode, Halkias' 2nd episode
305	275	"Tabletop Game Theory Pt. V: Musks of Nyarlathotep"	James Adomian, Stavros Halkias, David Kresses and Simone Norman	December 27, 2018	Premium; Adomian's 17th episode, Halkias' 3rd episode
306	276	"Under the Hood at the Beltway Garage"	—	December 30, 2018	—

=== 2019 ===
No. overall	Given No.	Title	Guests	Original release date	Notes
307	277	"Tabletop Game Theory Pt. VI: Musks of Nyarlathotep"	James Adomian, Stavros Halkias and Simone Norman	January 3, 2019	Premium; Adomian's 18th episode, Halkias' 4th episode, Norman's 2nd episode
308	278	"Vision 2020"	—	January 6, 2019	—
309	279	"Paul Walls"	Matt V. Brady	January 10, 2019	Premium; Brady's 5th episode
310	280	"MacKenzie's 60 Billion Dollar Challenge"	—	January 15, 2019	—
311	281	"Burger Night"	David Roth	January 17, 2019	Premium; Roth's 3rd episode
312	282	"Syzygy of a Down"	Gillian Russom and Karla Griego	January 21, 2019	—
313	283	"Contrarian Corner"	—	January 24, 2019	Premium
314	284	"Dave & Busters"	Dave Weigel	January 27, 2019	—
315	—	"BONUS: Venti Schultz Roast"	—	January 28, 2019	Excerpt of a live show in Seattle; live reading of Howard Schultz's book Pour Your Heart Into It: How Starbucks Built a Company One Cup at a Time
316	285	"Studio 69"	—	January 30, 2019	Premium; review of the TV series Studio 60 on the Sunset Strip
317	286	"Soul Man"	—	February 4, 2019	—
318	287	"Killy Elliott"	Jon Schwarz	February 7, 2019	Premium, later released as free
319	288	"So You Want to Start a Union"	Brace Belden	February 10, 2019	Belden's 2nd episode
320	289	"Support the Tropes"	—	February 14, 2019	Premium
321	290	"Maximum Boot"	Lyle Jeremy Rubin and James Adomian (as Lyndon LaRouche)	February 17, 2019	Adomian's 19th episode
322	291	"B*rnie or B*st"	—	February 22, 2019	Premium
323	292	"Hats Off to Larry"	Larry Charles	February 25, 2019	—
324	293	"The Nissan Sentra Cannot Hold"	Marshall Steinbaum	February 28, 2019	Premium
325	294	"CPAC: Judgment Days"	—	March 4, 2019	—
326	295	"Ballistic: Frost vs. Menaker"	—	March 7, 2019	Premium
327	296	"The Unsullied"	—	March 11, 2019	—
328	297	"King, Warrior, Magician, Lover"	Rob Delaney	March 13, 2019	Premium; Delaney's 2nd episode
329	—	"Bonus: This Is Where I Leave EU"	Costas Lapavitsas	March 15, 2019	—
330	298	"The Israel Nerd"	Eli Valley	March 18, 2019	—
331	—	"Bonus: Will Interviews Kim Stanley Robinson with The Antifada"	Kim Stanley Robinson	March 21, 2019	—
332	299	"All Cops are Burgers"	Bill Oakley	March 21, 2019	Premium
333	300	"EMERGENCY POD: THE MUELLER REPORT"	James Adomian (as Sebastian Gorka)	March 24, 2019	Adomian's 20th episode
334	301	"The Little Magicians"	Alex Pareene	March 27, 2019	Premium
335	302	"The Russia House"	Matt Taibbi	April 1, 2019	—
336	303	"In The Golan Heights"	Derek Davison	April 4, 2019	Premium; Davison's 11th episode
337	304	"Moby Dick Energy"	—	April 8, 2019	—
338	305	"A Simple Plan"	Leigh Phillips and Michal Rozworski	April 11, 2019	Premium
339	306	"2 Cities, 1 Cup"	—	April 14, 2019	—
340	307	"The Inebriated Past: American Conspiracies"	—	April 17, 2019	Premium; Christman's 5th solo episode
341	308	"There's Nothing Like a Dame"	Nick Hayes	April 21, 2019	—
342	309	"The Trumpman Prophecies"	—	April 24, 2019	Premium; review of the film The Trump Prophecy
343	—	"Bonus: Virgil Interviews John Cameron Mitchell on "Anthem: Homunculus""	John Cameron Mitchell	April 28, 2019	—
344	—	"Bonus: Amber Interviews Vivek Chibber on "The ABC's of Capitalism""	Vivek Chibber	April 28, 2019	—
345	310	"Marianne Mindset"	—	April 29, 2019	—
346	311	"2 Mountain, 2 Furious"	—	May 2, 2019	Premium
347	312	"Kenneth Friendly's Scorpio Smiling"	Yael Bridge and Morgan Spector	May 6, 2019	—
348	313	"A Cure for Wellness"	—	May 9, 2019	Premium
349	314	"What, Us Worry?"	James Adomian	May 12, 2019	Adomian's 21st episode
350	315	"A Song of Air and America"	Sam Seder	May 16, 2019	Premium
351	316	"PBS: Permanent Revolution"	Hasan Piker	May 19, 2019	—
352	317	"Friends of the Pod"	—	May 23, 2019	Premium
353	318	"Rahm Emmanuelle: The Joys of a Neolib"	Ryan Grim	May 27, 2019	—
354	319	"Live at Cornell: Perfect Balance"	—	May 30, 2019	Premium
355	320	"Live from Berlin: Der Fonkybeatz"	—	June 3, 2019	—
356	321	"Live from Glasgow: Bottle of Buckie"	—	June 6, 2019	Premium
357	322	"Second Dark Age"	Alan Moore	June 10, 2019	—
358	323	"Best of UK Live: Toby Young Sex Diaries"	—	June 13, 2019	Premium
359	324	"Live from Dublin: Irish Valor"	—	June 17, 2019	—
360	325	"Living in America"	—	June 20, 2019	Premium
361	—	"Bonus: Virgil Interviews Tiffany Cabán"	Tiffany Cabán	June 20, 2019	Interview with activist and Queens County, New York district attorney candidate Tiffany Cabán
362	326	"Beltway Garage: Infinity Candidates"	—	June 25, 2019	—
363	—	"Bonus: The Marianne Williamson Interview"	Marianne Williamson	June 26, 2019	Interview with spiritual teacher and presidential candidate Marianne Williamson
364	327	"Have You Heard The Good News?"	David Sirota	June 28, 2019	Premium
365	—	"Bonus: Gremlins 2"	Joe Dante	June 30, 2019	—
366	328	"Dios, Patria, Fueros, Rod"	—	July 1, 2019	—
367	329	"The Inebriated Past, Part 5: DemoCRIPS and ReBLOODlicans"	—	July 4, 2019	Premium; Christman's 6th solo episode
368	330	"Hunter on the Loose"	Will Sommer	July 8, 2019	Sommer's 5th episode
369	331	"The Wide World of Warcraft"	John Dolan	July 10, 2019	Premium; Dolan's 2nd episode
370	332	"Fear of a Netroots Nation"	Brendan James	July 15, 2019	James' 9th episode
371	—	"Bonus: The Andrew Yang Interview"	Andrew Yang	July 18, 2019	Interview with businessman and presidential candidate Andrew Yang
372	333	"One in the Pinker"	—	July 18, 2019	Premium
373	334	"American Mids"	—	July 22, 2019	—
374	335	"Shrugging Towards Bethlehem"	Brace Belden and Liz Franczak	July 25, 2019	Premium; Belden's 3rd episode
375	336	"Neom 2049"	Glenn Greenwald	July 29, 2019	Greenwald's 2nd episode
376	337	"I Think You Should Leave"	Brendan James	August 1, 2019	Premium; James' 10th episode
377	338	"Live from Traverse City: Michael and We"	Brendan James and Michael Moore	August 5, 2019	James' 11th episode; live show from the Traverse City Film Festival
378	339	"House of the Rising Sundown"	—	August 8, 2019	Premium
379	340	"A Big Bowl of Strawberry Ice Cream"	—	August 12, 2019	—
380	341	"Live from Des Moines: Bring Out the Hogs!"	—	August 15, 2019	Premium
381	342	"The Cuts Stay In The Podcast"	—	August 20, 2019	—
382	343	"Checking the Dipstick"	—	August 22, 2019	Premium
383	344	"Koch & Poll Torture"	—	August 26, 2019	—
384	—	"AHOY! The Joe Sestak Interview"	Joe Sestak	August 27, 2019	Interview with US Navy Admiral, former Congressman and Presidential candidate Joe Sestak
385	345	"The Conspiracy Files: The Deep-ly Gay State"	—	August 29, 2019	Premium; review of the film JFK
386	346	"Twisted Tales"	—	September 3, 2019	—
387	347	"Renn Faire"	Stefan Heck	September 6, 2019	Premium; Heck's 2nd episode
388	348	"Dragged Across Concrete"	Marcus Barnett and Osita Nwanevu	September 9, 2019	Barnett's 3rd episode; Nwanevu's 2nd episode
389	349	"The Righteous Fallwells"	—	September 12, 2019	Premium
390	350	"Gotta Have My Pop!"	—	September 16, 2019	—
391	–	"Bonus Interview: Tom O'Neill and Chaos"	Tom O'Neill and Noah Kulwin	September 16, 2019	—
392	351	"Give Up Your Inquiries Which Are Completely Useless"	Nick Mullen	September 20, 2019	Premium; review of the film Eyes Wide Shut; Mullen's 2nd episode
393	352	"Rod Dreher's The Exorcist II"	—	September 24, 2019	—
394	353	"The Education of a Cynic"	Jon Schwarz	September 26, 2019	Premium; review of Samantha Power's book The Education of an Idealist; Schwarz's 2nd episode
395	—	"Bonus: Tabletop Game Theory Origins: Mr. Jeffstein's House"	—	September 30, 2019	Live show from Providence, Rhode Island.
396	354	"Thou, Nature, Art My Goddess"	—	October 1, 2019	—
397	355	"North American Scum"	Luke Savage and Don Hughes	October 3, 2019	Premium; 2019 Canadian Federal Election analysis
398	—	"Bonus: The Bernie Sanders Interview"	Bernie Sanders	October 4, 2019	Interview with Senator and Presidential candidate Bernie Sanders
399	356	"Sympathy for the Joker"	Jen Pan, Nick Mullen, Adam Friedland and Matt V. Brady	October 8, 2019	Friedland's 6th episode, Brady's 6th episode, Mullen's 3rd episode; review of the film Joker
400	357	"We Have a Rat Problem"	Tim Heidecker	October 10, 2019	Premium; Heidecker's 5th episode, discussion of Heidecker's film Mister America
401	358	"World on a Wire"	Naomi Klein	October 14, 2019	Klein's 2nd episode
402	359	"SSSSSSSSMoking with Slavoj"	Slavoj Žižek	October 17, 2019	Premium
403	360	"Bernie Blanco Goes To Queens"	Matt Karp	October 21, 2019	Karp's 3rd episode
404	361	"The Brothers"	Brendan James	October 25, 2019	Premium; review of the film The Reliant; James' 12th episode
405	362	"Wet Sauce"	Kenzo Shibata	October 28, 2019	—
406	363	"Epstein Ain't Going Away"	Brace Belden	October 31, 2019	Premium; Belden's 4th episode
407	364	"Human Deadspinality Project"	David Roth	November 4, 2019	Roth's 4th episode
408	365	"Big Johnson's Hard Election"	Grace Blakeley	November 7, 2019	Premium; 2019 United Kingdom general election analysis
409	366	"The Terminal"	—	November 12, 2019	—
410	367	"The Inebriated Past: Gladio"	—	November 14, 2019	Premium
411	368	"High, High Hopes"	Kathryn Ledebur	November 18, 2019	—
412	369	"CIA Jim: Caracas Connection"	—	November 18, 2019	Premium; review of the TV series Jack Ryan
413	370	"WeWork Will Set You Free"	—	November 25, 2019	—
414	371	"Beltway Garage: The Legend of Bernie's Gold"	—	November 28, 2019	Premium
415	372	"Karmala Police"	—	December 2, 2019	—
416	373	"It's Demon Night In America!"	—	December 5, 2019	Premium
417	374	"Perverts of Interest"	Don Hughes	December 9, 2019	Hughes' 2nd episode
418	375	"Live in London: Chapo Calling"	Rob Delaney	December 12, 2019	Premium; Delaney's 3rd episode; Live show from London, England
419	376	"Imagine A World Without"	—	December 17, 2019	—
420	377	"Escape from UK"	—	December 20, 2019	Premium
421	378	"The Story Of Coach O"	—	December 23, 2019	—
422	379	"A Very COBRA Christmas"	—	December 25, 2019	Premium; review of the film Cobra
423	380	"Our Dumb Decade"	—	December 30, 2019	—

=== 2020 ===
No. overall	Given No.	Title	Guests	Original release date	Notes
424	381	"Pod Tweet America"	—	January 2, 2020	Premium
425	—	"Bonus: So, I Just Watched 300..."	Derek Davison	January 6, 2020	Davison's 12th episode
426	382	"Falcon Seeks Falconer"	Briahna Joy Gray	January 6, 2020	Gray's 2nd episode
427	383	"No War But The Meme War"	—	January 10, 2020	Premium
428	384	"Beltway Garage: Warren Strikes Back"	—	January 14, 2020	—
429	385	"Lyin' Liz"	Brendan James	January 17, 2020	Premium; James' 13th episode
430	386	"Brother Magic"	Josh and Benny Safdie	January 20, 2020	—
431	—	"Bonus: Will Interviews Nithya Raman"	Nithya Raman	January 22, 2020	—
432	387	"The Royals"	—	January 23, 2020	Premium
433	388	"A Perfectly Frumulent Episode"	—	January 28, 2020	—
434	389	"Game It Out"	—	January 31, 2020	Premium, later released as free
435	390	"Live from Iowa City: Solidarity Forever"	—	February 3, 2020	Live show from Iowa City, Iowa
436	391	"Bernie Won"	—	February 5, 2020	Premium, later released as free
437	392	"Live from New Hampshire: Full Rat Mode"	—	February 10, 2020	Live show from Derry, New Hampshire
438	393	"2 for 2"	Don Hughes	February 14, 2020	Premium; Hughes' 3rd episode
439	394	"Debbie Just Met My Dad"	—	February 17, 2020	—
440	395	"Live from Las Vegas: The Chapo Trap House Always Wins"	Adam Friedland	February 21, 2020	Premium; Friedland's 7th episode; Live show from Las Vegas, Nevada
441	396	"Live from San Diego: Masterclass Mode"	—	February 24, 2020	Live show from San Diego, California
442	397	"Around The Horn"	Justin Jackson	February 27, 2020	Premium
443	398	"Live from San Francisco: Mind Palace of Fine Arts"	Brace Belden and Liz Franczak	March 2, 2020	Belden's 5th episode; Franczak's 2nd episode; live show from San Francisco, California
444	399	"1 v 1"	—	March 5, 2020	Premium
445	400	"The Stand"	—	March 9, 2020	—
446	401	"Hyper Jokerfication Pt. 1"	Brendan James and Katherine Krueger	March 12, 2020	Premium; First part of a two part review of the documentary series Hillary; James' 14th episode; Krueger's 5th episode
447	—	"Bonus – Beltway Garage: Reboot"	Branko Marcetic	March 15, 2020	—
448	402	"G.I. Joe Biden Goes to Baghdad"	Brendan James and Noah Kulwin	March 16, 2020	James' 15th episode; Kulwin's 3rd episode
449	403	"Hyper Jokerfication Pt. 2"	Brendan James and Katherine Krueger	March 20, 2020	Premium; Second part of a two part review of the documentary series Hillary; James' 16th episode; Krueger's 6th episode
450	404	"Mother Mother Please"	—	March 23, 2020	—
451	405	"Social Justice Watto"	—	March 26, 2020	Premium; A "watch-along" of Star Wars: Episode 1 – The Phantom Menace in the style of Mystery Science Theater 3000 and RiffTrax
452	406	"The Hospital"	John Pearson	March 30, 2020	—
453	—	"Pillow Talk"	Tim Heidecker	April 2, 2020	Bonus Episode
454	407	"EII-Jedi Grooming Academy"	@hayleyglyphs	April 2, 2020	Premium; Watch-along of Star Wars: Episode II – Attack of the Clones like Episode 405
455	—	"This is Sus"	—	April 4, 2020	Bonus Episode; Felix reviews This Is Us
456	408	"Death is Not the End"	—	April 7, 2020	—
457	—	"We Are Sex Podcasters"	Bryan Quinby	April 9, 2020	Bonus Episode; Quinby's 7th episode
458	409	"EIII: The Storm Is Coming"	@hayleyglyphs	April 9, 2020	Premium; Watch-along of Star Wars: Episode III – Revenge of the Sith like Episode 405 and 407; @hayleyglyphs' 2nd episode
459	410	"Memento Bernie"	—	April 13, 2020	—
460	—	"This is Sus 2: Council of Dads"	Lucy Biederman	April 14, 2020	Bonus Episode; Felix reviews Council of Dads
461	—	"Teamsters Delivers the Goods"	Matt Maini	April 14, 2020	Bonus Episode
462	411	"Entering Phase 2"	Brace Belden and Liz Franczak	April 16, 2020	Premium; Belden's 6th episode; Franczak's 3rd episode
463	412	"Protests of the Dead"	—	April 20, 2020	—
464	—	"This is Sus 3: A Million Little Things"	Jack Wagner	April 22, 2020	Bonus Episode; Felix reviews A Million Little Things; Wagner's 2nd episode
465	413	"Jesus Wept (for Brandt)"	—	April 23, 2020	Premium; review of the film Assassin 33 AD
466	414	"Noise Kills"	Palma and Ben Mora	April 27, 2020	—
467	—	"This Is Sus 4: The Slap"	—	April 28, 2020	Bonus Episode; Felix reviews The Slap
468	415	"Consider the Orc"	Alex Branson	April 30, 2020	Premium
469	416	"Operation: Guaido"	—	May 4, 2020	—
470	—	"The Greypill"	@hayleyglyphs	May 5, 2020	Bonus Episode; @hayleyglyphs' 3rd episode
471	—	"This is Sus 5 – This Is Us, Part 2"	—	May 6, 2020	Bonus Episode; Felix reviews This Is Us
472	417	"The Inebriated Past, Part 7: EPIC Fail"	—	May 7, 2020	Premium
473	418	"The Cool Zone"	Steven Donziger	May 11, 2020	—
474	419	"Absolute Masterclass: Aaron Sorkin"	—	May 14, 2020	Premium
475	—	"This is Sus 6 – Council of Dads, Part 2"	Lucy Biederman	May 15, 2020	Bonus Episode; Felix reviews Council of Dads; Lucy Biederman's 2nd episode
476	420	"White Lines"	Stavros Halkias	May 11, 2020	Halkias' 5th episode
477	421	"Absolute Masterclass: Je Suis Sorkin"	—	May 21, 2020	Premium
478	—	"This Is Sus 7 – A Million Little Things, Part 2"	Trevor Beaulieu, Jack Wagner	May 22, 2020	Bonus Episode; Beaulieu's 4th episode; Wagner's 3rd episode
479	422	"Can We Beat 9?"	—	May 25, 2020	—
480	—	"Bonus: The Jakarta Method"	Vincent Bevins	May 27, 2020	Bonus Episode;
481	423	"Targets"	—	May 28, 2020	Premium, released as free 5/29/20.
482	—	"Bonus: This is Sus 8 – Oz"	—	May 29, 2020	Bonus Episode; Felix and Matt review Oz
483	424	"When Will They Shoot?"	—	June 1, 2020	—
484	425	"8 is Enough"	Trevor Beaulieu	June 4, 2020	Premium; Beaulieu's 5th episode.
485	426	"Musings"	—	June 8, 2020	—
486	427	"Democracy Whiskey Scorpion"	—	June 12, 2020	Premium; review of the film Red Scorpion
487	428	"No Crying in Raceball"	Jen Pan	June 15, 2020	Pan's 2nd Episode
488	—	"Bonus: This is Sus 9 – Ray Donovan"	—	June 16, 2020	Bonus Episode; Felix reviews TV series Ray Donovan
489	429	"Nestors of Anarchy"	—	June 18, 2020	Premium
490	430	"Beltway Garage: Redemption"	—	June 22, 2020	—
491	—	"Bonus: This is Sus 10 – Billions, Ep 1: Piss Dads"	—	June 26, 2020	Bonus Episode; Felix and Amber review Billions
492	431	"Boat to the Future"	—	June 26, 2020	Premium
493	—	"Bonus: My Podcast with Wally"	Wallace Shawn	June 28, 2020	Bonus Episode
494	432	"Entourage Every Day"	Adam Friedland	June 29, 2020	Friedland's 8th episode
495	433	"Simply Resistible"	—	July 2, 2020	Premium; review of the film Irresistible
496	434	"Project for a New American Lincoln"	—	July 6, 2020	—
497	—	"Bonus: This is Sus 11 – Queer Eye"	Palma and Ben Mora	July 8, 2020	Bonus Episode; Palma's 2nd episode, Mora's 2nd episode
498	435	"Cancel Crisis"	Matt Taibbi	July 9, 2020	Premium; Taibbi's 4th episode
499	436	"Consider the Lobster"	David Roth	July 13, 2020	Roth's 5th episode
500	437	"Operation: Flashpoint"	—	July 16, 2020	Premium
501	—	"Bonus: Nithya Raman's Runoff Return"	Nithya Raman	July 17, 2020	Bonus Episode; Raman's 2nd episode
502	438	"They Moved the Moon"	Séamus Malekafzali	July 20, 2020	—
503	439	"Maple Gladio"	Dan Boeckner	July 23, 2020	Premium
504	440	"Arm the Emus"	—	July 27, 2020	—
505	441	"Orange Julius or Hi-C and Turkey?"	Adam McKay	July 30, 2020	Premium
506	442	"Battle Without Honor or Humanity"	Derek Davison and Patrick Wyman	August 3, 2020	Davison's 13th episode
507	443	"God, Could Dad Drive a Car"	—	August 6, 2020	Premium
508	444	"The Rats are Coming"	Ike Barinholtz	August 10, 2020	—
509	445	"Irish Roulette"	—	August 13, 2020	Premium
510	446	"Reversal of Alan"	—	August 17, 2020	Review of the film Reversal of Fortune
511	447	"DuNCe"	—	August 21, 2020	Premium
512	448	"Real Steel America"	—	August 24, 2020	—
513	449	"Dream Police"	—	August 27, 2020	Premium
514	450	"In The Bubble"	Patrick Redford	August 31, 2020	—
515	451	"Fuddruckers on the Moon"	—	September 3, 2020	Premium
516	452	"Sucker-Bait"	Derek Davison and Daniel Bessner	September 7, 2020	Davison's 14th episode
517	-	"BONUS: Will interviews Delaware Senate candidate Jessica Scarane"	Jessica Scarane	September 9, 2020	—
518	453	"Frogger"	Arthur Jones and Giorgio Angelini	September 10, 2020	Premium
519	454	"November Rain"	—	September 14, 2020	—
520	455	"Dancing at the End of History"	—	September 17, 2020	Premium; Review of the film Richard Jewell
521	456	"Beltway Garage: Avengeance Protocol"	Don Hughes	September 22, 2020	Hughes' 4th episode
522	457	"Celebrity Skin"	Stefan Heck	September 24, 2020	Premium; Heck's 3rd episode
523	458	"Too Fail To Fail"	—	September 28, 2020	—
524	459	"The Homey Rule"	—	October 1, 2020	Premium
525	460	"Masque of the Orange Death"	—	October 5, 2020	—
526	461	"Q And Not U"	Julian Feeld	October 8, 2020	Premium
527	462	"Feelin' Like Chera"	Tim Robbins	October 12, 2020	—
528	463	"Grin and Bear It"	Matt Hongoltz-Hetling	October 15, 2020	Premium
529	464	"Live MAS"	—	October 19, 2020	—
530	-	"Bonus: Will interviews Ollie Vargas about Bolivia"	Ollie Vargas	October 20, 2020	—
531	465	"Sorkinverse: Rise of the 7"	Dave Anthony and Josh Olson	October 23, 2020	Premium, later released as free; Anthony's 2nd Episode; review of the film The Trial of the Chicago 7; Anthony and Olson are cohosts of The West Wing Thing, a podcast reviewing The West Wing
532	466	"Beltway Garage: Endgame"	—	October 27, 2020	—
533	467	"The FailKids Bracket"	—	October 29, 2020	Premium
534	468	"Judgment Night"	—	November 2, 2020	—
535	469	"Disco 2020"	—	November 5, 2020	Premium
536	470	"Mothership Connection"	Derek Davison and Daniel Bessner	November 9, 2020	Davison's 15th episode; Bessner's 2nd episode
537	471	"Poppy, Part 1"	—	November 12, 2020	Premium; later released as free; a history episode, the first part of a biography of George H. W. Bush
538	472	"Guess I'll Just Kill Myself"	David Roth	November 16, 2020	Roth's 6th episode
539	473	"O Cuomo Where Art Thou?"	—	November 19, 2020	Premium
540	474	"Obama Admin Speedrun"	Osita Nwanevu	November 23, 2020	Nwanevu's 3rd episode
541	475	"The Hills Have Cries"	The Trillbillies	November 25, 2020	Premium, discussion of the film Hillbilly Elegy
542	476	"Office of Mario and Brothers"	—	November 30, 2020	—
543	477	"Celestial Vision"	—	December 3, 2020	Premium
544	478	"World Tree Center"	—	December 8, 2020	Discussion of the film Avatar from James Cameron
545	479	"Malibu Kelly's Dream House"	—	December 10, 2020	Premium
546	480	"Dr. Jill, Medicine Woman"	—	December 14, 2020	—
547	481	"Another End Is Possible"	Slavoj Žižek	December 17, 2020	Premium; Žižek's 2nd episode
548	482	"War is Over, Troops are Staying"	—	December 21, 2020	—
549	483	"Try Hard"	James Adomian, Brace Belden, Ike Barinholtz, Matt V. Brady, Alex Branson, Stavros Halkias, Don Hughes, Brendan James, Alex Nichols, Tom from Chapo FYM, and Aaron from Chapo FYM	December 25, 2020	Premium; Parody of Die Hard; Adomian's 22nd episode, Barinholtz's 2nd episode, Belden's 7th episode, Brady's 7th episode, Branson's 2nd episode, Halkias' 6th episode, Hughes' 5th episode, James' 17th episode, Nichols' 6th episode
550	484	"Girls on Film"	—	December 28, 2020	Review of the film Wonder Woman 1984
551	485	"Hellyear in Review"	—	December 31, 2020	Premium
