= Brünig =

Brünig or Bruenig may refer to:

- The Brünig Pass, between the Bernese Oberland and Central Switzerland
- The Brünig railway line, linking Interlaken and Lucerne in Switzerland
- Elizabeth Bruenig (born 1990), American opinion writer and editor for The Washington Post
- Matt Bruenig (born 1988), American lawyer, blogger, and policy analyst
