= McElwee =

McElwee is a surname. Notable people with the surname include:

- Andrew McElwee (died 1968), British trade unionist and politician
- Bob McElwee (born 1935), American football official
- Carol McElwee, American politician
- Enid McElwee (1914–2001), New Zealand fencer
- George McElwee (1879–?), Australian politician
- Joshua J. McElwee, American journalist
- Lee McElwee (1894–1957), American baseball player
- Rob McElwee (born 1961), English weather forecaster
- Ross McElwee (born 1947), American documentary filmmaker
- Samuel A. McElwee (1857–1914), American slave and lawyer
- Thomas McElwee (1957–1981), Irish Republican Army member
- William McElwee Miller (1892–1993), American missionary

== See also ==
- Lisa McElwee-White, American chemist
