= People's Policy Project =

American left-leaning think tank

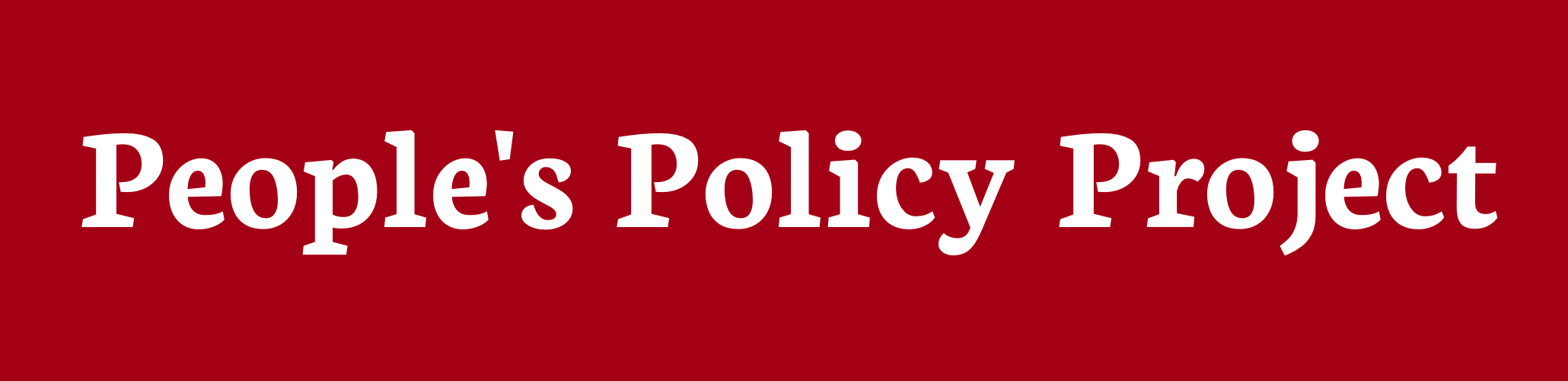
- Abbreviation: 3P
- Formation: 2017; 9 years ago
- Founder: Matt Bruenig
- Type: Think tank
- Headquarters: Washington, D.C., United States
- Owner: Matt Bruenig
- President: Matt Bruenig
- Revenue: Approximately $10,000/mo. (2018)
- Website: peoplespolicyproject.org

People's Policy Project (abbreviated 3P) is an American think tank focused on social, economic, and political equity issues. It has been described as "left-leaning", "left-wing", "democratic socialist–leaning", and "socialist". The organization has been noted for its unique funding structure: Unlike conventional think tanks, 3P relies on crowdfunding small donations, as opposed to financial support from corporations.

The founder and president of 3P is Matt Bruenig, a former lawyer at the National Labor Relations Board and former contributor to the US think tank Demos. 3P's work has been covered by Vox, Jacobin, and Huffington Post.

== History and funding ==
People's Policy Project (3P) primarily relies on small-dollar donations for funding. All funding is done through small donors on crowdfunding websites such as Patreon and a loan from the Paycheck Protection Program. This contrasts with standard funding models, which include large donations from institutions or private individuals, or paid consulting work.

In a 2017 Roll Call article, Bruenig elaborated on his vision for the think tank going forward. He argued that, despite left-wing policies proving popular among a wide chunk of the general electorate, financial constraints prevented progressive policy proposals such as single-payer healthcare from receiving significant attention from think tanks. Since its foundation, 3P has collaborated with a number of other organizations, including the Gravel Institute.

== Research areas ==
=== Social wealth fund ===
3P's Social Wealth Fund for America proposal advocates for public ownership of capital through gradual accumulation of all capital into a publicly-owned social wealth fund, which would be called the American Solidarity Fund. Per this proposal, each citizen of the US holds a non-transferable dividend-paying share; effectively providing a universal basic dividend.

=== Universal Basic Income (UBI) ===
3P has endorsed the proposed Sending Unconditional Payments to People Overcoming Resistances to Triumph (SUPPORT) Act, which would establish a system of universal basic income for all Americans.

=== Child welfare ===
3P's Family Fun Pack proposal advocates for a substantial suite of Nordic-style child welfare policies: a baby box, parental leave, free child care, free pre-kindergarten, free school lunch, free health care, and a child benefit. This project is targeted at eliminating child poverty, and removing economic concerns from family planning.

In 2021, Vox cited the 3P's estimation that around seven million American children that live in poverty are from families that did not file taxes.

=== Climate and environmental policy ===
3P's "Fighting Climate Change with a Green TVA "proposal advocates for including a massive de-carbonization and expansion of the Tennessee Valley Authority as part of the Green New Deal, in order to shrink greenhouse gas emissions and create public jobs. In 2021, 3P published a white paper advocating for full public funding of water utilities.

=== Crisis of overworking ===
Much of 3P's research work focuses on the negative ramifications of overworking, which takes a physical and mental toll on those that experience it. A report by 3P in collaboration with the Gravel Institute found that American workers, by average, work longer than workers in any other developed country. One of 3P's policy recommendations is to give all Americans one month paid vacation per year.

=== Judicial reform ===
3P has criticized Democratic politicians for appointing or pushing for the appointment of individuals with backgrounds in corporate law or former prosecutors to federal judgeships. Instead, 3P has advocated for the appointment of former union lawyers, civil rights lawyers, and public defenders to these roles.

== Leadership ==
- Matt Bruenig is the current president.
