= John Hughes (theologian) =

British scholar (1978–2014)

The Reverend John Hughes
- Born: John Mark David Hughes; 13 December 1978; Exeter, England
- Died: 29 June 2014 (aged 35); Cambridgeshire, England

Ecclesiastical career
- Religion: Christianity (Anglican)
- Church: Church of England
- Ordained: 2005 (deacon); 2006 (priest)
- Offices held: Dean of Chapel of Jesus College, Cambridge

Academic background
- Education: Jesus College, Cambridge; Merton College, Oxford; Emmanuel College, Cambridge
- Doctoral advisor: Catherine Pickstock
- Other advisor: Oliver O'Donovan

Academic work
- Discipline: Theology
- Sub-discipline: Philosophical theology
- School or tradition: Anglo-Catholicism; Christian socialism
- Institutions: Jesus College, Cambridge
- Notable students: Elizabeth Bruenig

John Mark David Hughes (13 December 1978 – 29 June 2014) was a British Anglican priest and theologian who was Dean of Chapel and Chaplain at Jesus College, Cambridge. He is known for his works on philosophy of religion, such as The End of Work: Theological Critiques of Capitalism. Hughes was born in Exeter, England. He was ordained as a deacon of the Church of England in 2005 and as a priest in 2006. He was the doctoral mentor of Elizabeth Bruenig. His school of tradition was Anglo-Catholicism, as well as Christian socialism.

Hughes was killed in a car crash in Cambridgeshire in 2014, aged 35. The John Hughes Arts Festival, founded by college students in 2014 in memory of Hughes, provides a broad programme of arts events, the first of which was held in 2015. Graced Life: The Writings of John Hughes (1979–2014) was published posthumously by SCM Press in 2016, and was edited by Matthew Bullimore.

== Books ==
- The End of Work: Theological Critiques of Capitalism. Malden, Massachusetts: Blackwell Publishing. 2007. ISBN 978-1-4051-5893-0.
- Graced Life: The Writings of John Hughes (1979–2014). Edited by Bullimore, Matthew. London: SCM Press. 2016. ISBN 978-0-334-05447-4.
