= Elizabeth Bruenig =

American journalist (born 1990)

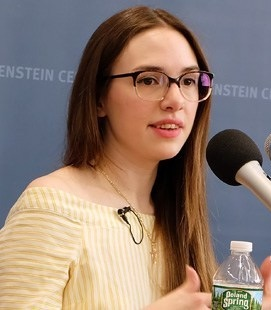
- Bruenig in 2018
- Born: Elizabeth Hope Stoker; December 5, 1990 (age 35); Arlington, Texas, US
- Other names: Liz Bruenig; Elizabeth Stoker Bruenig
- Education: Brandeis University (BA); Jesus College, Cambridge (MPhil)
- Occupation: Journalist
- Years active: 2015–present
- Employers: The Washington Post; The New York Times; The Atlantic
- Spouse: Matt Bruenig (m. 2014)
- Children: 2
- Website: elizabethbruenig.com

Elizabeth Stoker Bruenig (born Elizabeth Hope Stoker, December 6, 1990) is an American journalist working as an opinion writer for The Atlantic since 2021. She previously worked as a staff writer for The New Republic (2015), an opinion writer and editor for The Washington Post (2016–2020), and as an opinion writer for The New York Times (2020–2021). Bruenig has written about ethics, politics, theology, morality, economics, gender, family, class, and faith. She was a finalist for the Pulitzer Prize for Feature Writing in 2019 and in 2023. In 2023, she published her first book, On Human Slaughter: Evil, Justice, Mercy, a collection of her reporting on the death penalty.

== Early life and education ==
Elizabeth Stoker was born on December 6, 1990, in Arlington, Texas. She attended Martin High School. She graduated from Brandeis University in 2013 with a Bachelor of Arts degree with a double major in English and sociology and a minor in Near Eastern and Judaic studies. Bruenig studied at Jesus College at the University of Cambridge on a Marshall Scholarship, where she earned a Master of Philosophy degree in Christian theology, under the supervision of John Hughes. She was named a 2014–2015 Presidential Fellow at Brown University, where she was a doctoral student in religious studies, politics, and philosophy. In 2015, Bruenig left Brown University without a degree when she was offered a fulltime writing position at The New Republic.

== Career ==
Bruenig was an opinion writer and editor for The Washington Post and its Outlook and PostEverything sections, The New York Times, and since 2021 writes for The Atlantic. Previously in 2015, she was also a staff writer for The New Republic. As an assistant editor, Bruenig began to edit the Outlook and PostEverything sections of The Washington Post in early 2016, before being promoted in 2017 as opinion writer and editor, and in 2018 as a columnist. Her essays and reviews have appeared in publications including among others America, The American Conservative, The Atlantic, Boston Review, The Daily Beast, First Things, Jacobin, Los Angeles Review of Books, The Nation, Salon, and The Washington Post.

Bruenig writes about topics like ethics, politics, theology, and economics from a progressive viewpoint, and describes herself as "a chronicler of the human condition". With her husband, Matt Bruenig, with whom she wrote together two articles for The Atlantic in 2013, she co-hosts The Bruenigs podcast since 2018. Until April 2020, she was also a contributor to the Left, Right, & Center radio show. On May 12, 2021, it was announced that she would depart The New York Times, which she had joined in January 2020, for The Atlantic at the end of the month. Politico reported that this was the third New York Times opinion journalist to have gone to The Atlantic in the first five months of 2021.

In September 2018, Bruenig wrote about a 2006 sexual assault on a woman by the name of Amber Wyatt at Martin High School in Arlington, Bruenig's own alma mater (Bruenig was a 15-year-old sophomore), in a story for The Washington Post, describing the assault's repercussions. She started tracking the details of Wyatt's story in April 2015 when she worked at The New Republic. In 2019, Bruenig was named a Pulitzer Prize finalist in Feature Writing for one of her pieces covering Wyatt's sexual assault, "What Do We Owe Her Now?". (Note: The citation reads: "For eloquent reflections on the exile of a teen sexual assault victim in the author's Texas hometown, delving with moral authority into why the crime remained unpunished.") Bruenig was named in the 2019 edition of Forbes's 30 Under 30 list. During her time at The Washington Post and The New York Times, Bruenig advocated democratic socialist policies. In August 2020, she also wrote a racial reckoning article in The New York Times, "Racism Makes a Liar of God: How the American Catholic Church Is Wrestling with the Black Lives Matter Movement", which included a profile of EWTN radio host Gloria Purvis. As of 2021, she was a two-time Livingston Award finalist. Bruenig was again a Pulitzer Prize finalist in 2023. (Note: The citation reads: "For exposing the tortuous last hours of inmates awaiting execution on Alabama's death row and the efforts by the state to conceal the suffering, which led to a temporary moratorium on executions.")

== Political and religious views ==
In a Washington Monthly profile published in 2018 by Gilad Edelman, Bruenig is described as "perhaps the most prominently placed of a small but increasingly visible group of young writers unabashedly advocating for democratic socialism", and that she "cautioned against treating socialism versus capitalism as a binary choice" but echoed the idea of Jacobin founder Bhaskar Sunkara to "not merely tame but overcome capitalism". About why she did not subscribe to the New Brandeis movement, Bruenig observed that "the answer to the destruction wrought by capitalism isn't more, better capitalism". In a 2021 article in Brandeis Magazine, Lawrence Goodman described Bruenig's political positions thusly: "She's a democratic socialist but holds a number of socially conservative positions. She advocates for a strong Scandinavian-style welfare state but also opposes abortion and extols the benefits of having children early." In a 2022 article in Deseret News, Lois Collins described Bruenig as "just left of Bernie Sanders on economics, openly religious and quietly anti-abortion". For the American edition of The Week, she wrote an article in April 2014 explaining why she was a pro-life liberal. In April 2020, her New York Times article titled "Bernie Was Right" was republished by the Chicago Tribune and also in German by the International Politics and Society. She argued that Sanders was right about many issues, such as income inequality, climate change, and student loan debt, and that the United States would wave goodbye to an "honest man's campaign".

In February 2015, Bruenig wrote a New Republic article titled "Is ISIS Authentically Islamic? Ask Better Questions". She argued: "But since most of our public discussions of religion take place within this liberal framework, we lack a grammar and vocabulary for arguing about the content of religions in the public sphere. Because our presumptions about how to source religious authority are largely private and rarely interrogated in public (especially in interfaith contexts) we presume those assumptions are either broadly shared or simply correct, and base our public statements about the authenticity of religious belief and practice on them." In March 2015, Bruenig wrote "Fear of a Radical Pope", a profile of Pope Francis. In the article, she observed: "The Catholic Church has always been 'liberal' [i.e., left-wing] on economic matters. Since the early centuries of the Church, prominent theologians such as Ambrose, Augustine, and Saint John Chrysostom have emphasized that private property rights obtain only after all human needs have been met, and that the excess of the wealthy truly belongs to the poor."

Also in March 2015, several of Bruenig's articles at The New Republic attracted attention. In one article, titled "Conservatives' Prison Reform Plans Won't Work", she argued that "criminal justice reform, especially prison reform, has become a rare point of bipartisan activism" but that conservatives support it only for the money saved. Bruenig commented that sentencing reform "won't work" without more welfare spending, and wrote: "The real question isn't whether these conservatives care about the disadvantaged, but whether their approach will indeed improve the lives of the disadvantaged. There's strong evidence of quite the opposite—that it would make their lives worse." The other article was a response to David Brooks in The New York Times, where he had argued that poor people needed to learn to behave themselves. In her article, titled "Poor People Don't Need Better Social Norms. They Need Better Social Policies", Bruenig wrote: "If the problems plaguing poor communities persist after poverty is drastically reduced, that would seem an appropriate time to pursue the matter of a better 'moral vocabulary,' as Brooks calls it."

Her March 2018 Washington Post article, titled "It's Time to Give Socialism a Try", where she stated that "I would support a kind of socialism that would be democratic and aimed primarily at decommodifying labor, reducing the vast inequality brought about by capitalism, and breaking capital's stranglehold over politics and culture", drew more than 3,000 comments in contrast to the usual 1,000. This was followed by a response article, titled "Let's Have a Good-Faith Argument About Socialism", where she argued that "it makes sense to think of socialism on a spectrum, with countries and policies being more or less socialist, rather than either/or", and also received much attention. In a July 2018 article for The Washington Post, titled "Conservatives Will Always Call Socialists Hypocrites. Ignore them", Bruenig observed that "the failure of one set of accusations along these lines usually just leads to another, and it forms an ugly paradox that applies only to the left: If you care about material equality and you aren't destitute, you're a hypocrite; if you care about material equality and you are destitute, you're never going to have a real shot at political engagement to begin with." Other socialist-related Washington Post articles by Bruenig include "It's Time to Reclaim 'Socialism' from the Dirty-Word Category" about socialism in the United States. In April 2019, she wrote a Washington Post article about the American Christian left, titled "The Religious Left Is Always Just About to Happen: Will It Ever Arrive?"

== Personal life ==
Bruenig was raised Methodist but converted to Catholicism after studying Christian theology and the work of Augustine of Hippo in university, becoming confirmed into the Catholic Church during Easter 2014. That same year, she married Matt Bruenig, whom she met in their high school debate team in Arlington. They have two daughters together. In addition to English, Bruenig can speak German. Bruenig's views on abortion have attracted criticism among other American leftists. Bruenig, who joked that her husband "loves abortion", is more concerned with philosophical questions rather than specific policies, and said: "I make a much more romantic case for socialism than Matt does."

== Published works ==
- "Taking Augustine as Guide". In Schwindt, Daniel (ed.). Radically Catholic in the Age of Francis: An Anthology of Visions for the Future. Valparaiso, Indiana: Solidarity Hall Press. 2015. ISBN 978-0-692-40977-0.
- "Church". In McElwee, Joshua J.; Wooden, Cindy (eds.). A Pope Francis Lexicon. Collegeville, Minnesota: Liturgical Press. 2018. pp. 15–17. ISBN 978-0-8146-4545-1.
- On Human Slaughter: Evil, Justice, Mercy. New York: Zando. 2023. ISBN 978-1-63893-142-3.
- "In Praise of Shadows". In Barasch, Benjamin; Bromwich, David; Garsten, Bryan (eds.). Humanistic Judgment: Ten Experiments in Reading. New Haven, Connecticut: Yale University Press. 2026. pp. 163–182. doi:10.2307/jj.37105673.12. ISBN 978-0-300-26997-0.

== See also ==
- Christian left
- Christian socialism
