= Leon Chang =

American musician and artist

Leon Chang is an American artist, musician, and prominent online personality associated with Weird Twitter, where he is known as @leyawn. In 2017, he released Bird World, an album designed as a soundtrack to a fake video game. In 2020, he released a sequel. His other works include an adventure game played through Twitter and a Vine user name generator.
