= Joshua J. McElwee =

American journalist

Joshua J. McElwee is an American journalist covering the Catholic Church.

== Career ==
McElwee was previously a news editor for the National Catholic Reporter. His reporting, feature writing, and analysis have earned many awards from the Catholic Press Association of the United States and Canada and have been featured in a number of other outlets.

McElwee was awarded third-place for the Magazine Religion News Report prize of the Religion Newswriters Association in 2013, for which he also was a finalist in 2012. He was also a finalist for the Multiple Media award of that organization in 2014 and its Religion Feature Writer award in 2013.

McElwee has reported widely on the pontificate of Pope Francis, covering the pontiff since his election in March 2013. He has also focused his reporting on the Leadership Conference of Women Religious, the main umbrella organization of US Catholic women religious, and on the tensions between Catholic theologians and bishops in the US.

McElwee is also a frequent analyst for US radio and television programs. He has appeared regularly on National Public Radio programs including Morning Edition, On Point, and The Diane Rehm Show. McElwee became a Vatican correspondent for Reuters in 2024.

== Personal life ==
He is married to Kate McElwee, the executive director of the Women's Ordination Conference. As of 2018 both live in Rome, and both serve on the pastoral council of the Caravita Community.
