= Matt Bruenig =

American lawyer and commentator (born 1988)

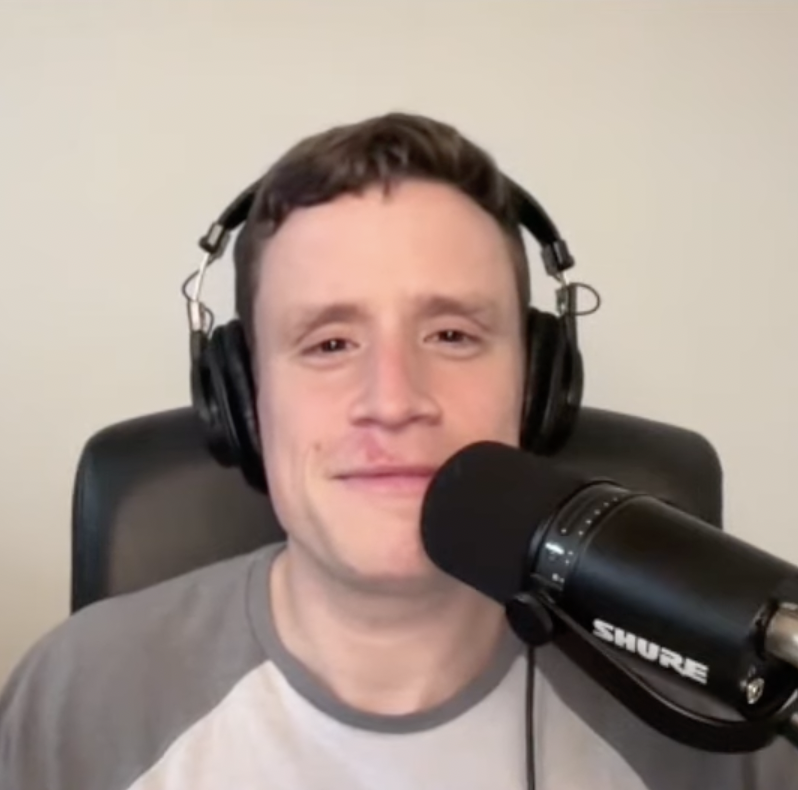
- Bruenig in 2025
- Born: Matthew Bruenig; November 22, 1988 (age 37); Arlington, Texas, US
- Education: University of Oklahoma (BA); Boston University (JD)
- Spouse: Elizabeth Bruenig (m. 2014)
- Children: 2
- Website: mattbruenig.com

Matthew Bruenig (born November 22, 1988) is an American lawyer, blogger, policy analyst, commentator, and founder of the left-leaning think tank People's Policy Project. He was a blogger for the American think tank Demos covering politics and public policy, and has written on issues including income distribution, taxation, welfare, elections, the Nordic model, and funds socialism. Bruenig advocates for mass unionization and socialization of wealth within an universalist welfare state.

== Early life and education ==
Bruenig was born on November 22, 1988, in Texas, where he also grew up. His father was an active shop steward, while his mother worked low-paid jobs, which motivated his support for workers' rights. He graduated in law at the University of Oklahoma (BA), where he was a National Merit Scholar and McNair Scholar, and Boston University (JD), and worked as a lawyer at the National Labor Relations Board. In 2013, Bruenig was awarded a Peggy Browning Fellowship for the 2014 academic year, when he graduated from Boston University. During his time at the University of Oklahoma, where he graduated summa cum laude in philosophy and Black studies, Bruenig founded and ran a chapter of Students for a Democratic Society, and led a living wage campaign on campus. He also worked as an intern at Jobs with Justice and for the International Association of Machinists and Aerospace Workers as part of the AFL-CIO Law Student Union Summer.

== Career ==
Bruenig researches poverty, inequality, and welfare systems, and is considered a welfare policy expert. Alongside Jonathan Chait, he is a proponent of a larger welfare state, and considers Social Security to be part of the welfare state, which is in line with most researchers, including welfare-state skeptics like Robert J. Samuelson. In response to the conservative argument put forward by the likes of Milton Friedman and Margaret Thatcher who "accused liberals [e.g. left-wingers] of preferring to make the poor poorer if it made the rich less rich", Bruenig writes that "[t]he obvious problem with the statement is that it simply assumes left-wing policies can't improve the incomes of the poor. The cross-country data that we have generally suggest that they can and do." He also writes "there's substantial evidence that suggests inequality, in and of itself, generates a whole slew of social problems that are harmful to individual and collective wellbeing. It is therefore conceivable that policies that reduce inequality could be worth pursuing even if they leave everyone, the poor included, with less income than they would otherwise have."

Bruenig is the author of numerous articles, including "Rethinking Noncombatant Immunity", "Fertility Rates and Government Intervention", "How Reform Conservatives Like Reihan Salam and Paul Ryan Misunderstand Poverty", "Nordic Zombie Arguments", "People Aren't Better Off Than Income Trends Show", "The Success Sequence Is About Cultural Beefs Not Poverty", "The Success Sequence Is Extremely Misleading and Impossible to Code", "Why Education Does Not Fix Poverty", and "Identitarian Deference Continues to Roil Liberalism", where he criticized "identitarian deference", which he defines as the concept that "privileged individuals should defer to the opinions and views of oppressed individuals, especially on topics relevant to those individuals' oppression". Bruenig was among the critics of Nima Sanandaji, who argued that the economic success of Sweden and other Nordic countries preceded their establishment of the welfare state.

Bruenig's writings have appeared in a wide range of publications, including among others The Atlantic, The American Prospect, BuzzFeed News, Common Dreams, Dissent, Current Affairs, The Guardian, In These Times, Jacobin, The New Republic, The New York Times, Salon, and The Washington Post. Daniel Denvir of Jacobin described Bruenig as "one of the most incisive analysts of poverty, inequality, and welfare systems and the political conflicts that surround them". Bruenig's writing about politics, the economy, and political theory is, in his own words, "primarily with a focus on the set of interlocking issues that affect poor and working people", and is "informed by a leftist political perspective that draws upon a diverse set of historical and contemporary leftist intellectuals". Among his influences, he cites "the various theories of egalitarian distributive justice that began with John Rawls", with "Amartya Sen's capability approach to distributive justice being perhaps the most influential". In his December 2013 review for Demos, Bruenig praised Lane Kenworthy's Social Democratic America (2013). In January 2015, Bruenig also praised Thomas Piketty's book Capital in the Twenty-First Century (2014). He wrote in the American edition of The Week, titled "America Should Jack Up Its Top Tax Rate to 70 Percent", that it "painstakingly details the dynamics of wealth and income inequality throughout the last two centuries, and offers a somewhat grim picture of the future of economic inequality. Along the way, Piketty also offers his theory of the cause of exploding executive pay and how we can successfully combat this destructive trend."

In 2016, Bruenig was fired from his part-time job blogging for Demos after he posted a series of tweets targeting first Joan Walsh and later Center for American Progress president Neera Tanden. Demos stated that he was let go due to a pattern of "online harassment of people with whom he disagrees"; some journalists nevertheless speculated that there may have been outside pressure on behalf of Tanden. In February 2017, Bruenig was among other figures of the American Left, such as Corey Robin and Nathan J. Robinson, to lament the loss of Keith Ellison to Thomas Perez for the chair of the Democratic National Committee and that the leadership of the Democratic Party was resisting acknowledging the failures of the Obama administration. Bruenig wrote: "The left should focus its energies on organizing under alternative institutions that, if they engage with the Democratic party at all, only do so in order to attempt hostile takeovers of various power positions. Only a sucker would do more than that, given what the party has just shown itself to be about at this time."

In 2017, Bruenig founded the People's Policy Project, a left-leaning or socialist-leaning think tank. The think tank, of which Bruenig serves as its president, raises money through crowdfunding, and analyzes politics and produces socialist/social democratic policy proposals tailored to the United States context. It soon attracted attention in liberal policy circles. At the People's Policy Project, Bruenig repeatedly criticized jobs guarantee plans as "muddled", especially on the critical question of "coming up with suitable jobs". In February 2019, the People's Policy Project released its Family Fun Pack platform, which is loosely based on the Finnish welfare state model. A YouGov poll commissioned by the People's Policy Project in October 2019 found the free public childcare and pre-kindergarten advocated policy to be popular and supported by a majority of Americans. In a series of analysis that attracted attention, including from Eleanor Mueller of Politico, Bruenig was critical of the child care proposal by Democrats as part of the Build Back Better Act, which he said would increase prices for the middle class by $13,000, and how in 2023 it kept work requirements. In The Atlantic, he wrote the article "How the Democratic Child-Care Proposal Hurts Families", arguing that it would "dramatically increase demand for child-care services as newly subsidized users pour into the sector". Alongside Rebecca Traister, Bruenig was an early critic of Melissa Kearney's book The Two-Parent Privilege: How Americans Stopped Getting Married and Started Falling Behind (2023).

== Political views and commentary ==
=== Socialism, democratic socialism, and social democracy ===
Bruenig is a democratic socialist in the tradition of market socialism, as well as an advocate of Nordic socialism, and has been described by Matthew Yglesias as an "eccentric socialist". He argues that democratic ownership is "a crucial step on the road to a democratic socialist future", and describes his brand of socialism, "the development of the idea from Rudolf Hilferding to the Meidner Plan", as follows: "Socialism is the idea that capital (the means of production) should be owned collectively. There are divergent ideas about how to achieve this in reality. One approach is to have the government hold it collectively in social wealth funds. This is (more or less) the socialism of Yanis Varoufakis, Rudolf Meidner, and John E. Roemer. It is also my brand of socialism, at least for the time." He also stated that "in ideal liberal theory, citizens themselves are the source of all governmental action", and argued alongside William A. Edmundson et al. that "political philosophy can and ought to make use of the concept of the means of production".

In a 2018 debate on Jacobin with Democratic Socialists of America member Neal Meyer and sociologists Mathieu Desan and Michael A. McCarthy about where Nordic social democracies fit into the vision for democratic socialism, Bruenig argued that while the Soviet Union was not a democracy because the state was unaccountable to the people, this type of criticism does not apply to Nordic countries because they are parliamentary democracies, and that to draw a hard line between democratic socialism and actually existing social democracies is not accurate. According to Bruenig, this is further complicated by the fact that democratic socialism is often discussed in ideal rather than practical terms, and that this misses the many socialist aspects of actually existing social democracies. For example, Bruenig cites as examples the socialist aspects of Norway and Singapore, among others, to show that "it is quite possible to collectively own the means of production while also using price systems to assist in the allocation of productive factors", and that this is "what market socialists have been saying for a hundred years".

=== Nordic model and socialism ===
Bruenig is a supporter of the Nordic model, and has written several articles about it. According to Bruenig, "Nordic economies do not provide any support for the idea that relatively high levels of state ownership are incompatible with stable and successful economies". He argues that while they are not fully socialist, Nordic economies include "an efficient single-payer health care system, free college, long parental leave, heavily subsidized child care, and many other social benefits too numerous to list here", and their socialist credentials have been dismissed "to deny that there are leftist success stories in the world". In contrast to the likes of Jonathan Chait who think that the Nordic economies feature an "amped-up version of ... neoliberalism" and a large number of American conservative and libertarian writers, such as Will Wilkinson at the Niskanen Center, who state that the Nordic economies are "quasi-libertarian", Bruenig argues that "this is not true" as "Nordic economies are also home to large public sectors, strong job protections, and labor markets governed by centralized union contracts". In this vein, he argues that Norway, which owned 58.6 percent of the country's wealth (the double of Communist China) as of 2018 and described it as "by far the most socialist country in the developed world", is more socialist than Bolivarian Venezuela, concluding that if "government spending of around 40 percent of GDP, a minimum wage, and a small coop sector equals socialism [as argued by some pundits in the case of Bolivarian Venezuela], then Americans live in socialism every single day".

=== Funds socialism ===
Bruenig shares the socialist argument that the golden age of capitalism was simply a temporary deviation from the inexorable logic of capitalism, and that its neoliberal turn showed the true nature of capitalism reasserting itself. He argues that the postwar decades were "quite anomalous" as the Great Depression and World War II had created historically unique conditions that could not last forever, and adds: "True, inequality goes down. But excepting that, we're right back on the trail. Marx would tell you: Capital accumulates. It's a natural tendency." Among other socialist intellectuals, including his wife, Elizabeth Bruenig, who generally rejected the binary choice between socialism and capitalism, he echoed the idea of Jacobin founder Bhaskar Sunkara to "not merely tame but overcome capitalism". Bruenig says that his answer to "the capital problem" is to "socialize capital as much as you can into these social wealth funds, which are like endowments that the country runs. The social wealth funds will deliver capital returns just like endowments do and take those returns and pay them out to everyone as part of a social dividend. That has been a sort of market socialist idea for, I don't know, maybe a hundred years now."

Bruenig's plan, which involves the creation of an American Solidarity Fund, is similar to that of Alaska, Norway, and many state public employee pension funds. He proposed it in a New York Times op-ed, titled "A Simple Fix for Our Massive Inequality Problem", as one way to reduce income inequality in the United States, with Noah Smith writing that it "seems extremely promising and woefully overlooked". Smith suggested that Bruenig's plan would not only fix inequality but also find "a way to insure the American middle and working class against technological change". In Democracy, sociologist Dalton Conley also called, in 2009 and due to the 2008 financial crisis, for the establishment of an American sovereign wealth fund. In addition to his concept of social wealth funds, Bruenig published a paper authored by The Week writer Ryan Cooper and Dublin-based researcher Saoirse Gowan arguing that the best response to the issue of housing affordability would be a massive social housing project, in which the government would pay to build ten million homes over ten years, pointing to the success of such a program in European countries like Austria and Sweden.

=== Universal basic income ===
Bruenig writes that a universal basic income is "a way of dealing with the capital problem" but that for the "Silicon Valley types and the libertarian types" it is "a remedy to the problems their innovation is causing or that they think their innovation will cause", and describes the possible implementation by them as a "terrible ... very dystopian idea". Bruenig also says that passive income already exists in capitalist societies. He writes: "[C]apitalist societies already dedicate a large portion of their economic outputs to paying out money to people who have not worked for it. The UBI does not invent passive income. It merely doles it out evenly to everyone in society, rather than in very concentrated amounts to the richest people in society." Bruenig thus argues in favor of a basic income for all, and provides a list of taxation possibilities for creating a Social Wealth Fund capable of paying an universal income. He further states, in response to Amazon's raise of wages at least $15 per hour, that "[w]age levels are determined as much by social forces as they are by market forces", and that "wage-setting is driven not by invisible hands, but by the decisions of real people who can be affected by collective-pressure tactics and other forms of social power". He argues that simply increasing unemployment benefits rather than using stimulus checks would be insufficient in helping the poorest Americans.

=== Healthcare, education, and other policies ===
Bruenig is an advocate of single-payer healthcare, and has argued extensively in favor of its feasibility. He says that "Medicaid was the most effective and most popular part of Obamacare" and that it "kept the [Obamacare] afloat", showing that "this simple public-health insurance program ends up creating far better constituencies and support bases than these complicated Rube Goldberg machines like Obamacare". He wrote an article making the case that liberal critics of single-payer healthcare are "moral monsters" on par with proponents of Trumpcare. Bruenig later explained: "Moving from Obamacare to Trumpcare, twenty-four million people would lose their insurance. By the same token, keeping Obamacare instead of single-payer will keep twenty-eight million people from being insured. They're similar magnitudes. In fact, the Obamacare to single-payer magnitude is higher." As an advocate Medicare for All, he argues that it would cut poverty by over 20 percent, lifting 8 million people out of poverty and at the same time generating economic growth as individuals invest more into the economy by spending on consumer goods.

Bruenig was skeptical of free higher education, later commenting: "My issue was not Clinton's issue, which is that it supports rich students when it should support poor students. My position is that providing benefits to students ignores non-students." He supports the education system in Finland and Sweden, where "benefits paid to students are paid out from the same welfare agency that you would go to if you were a single mother and didn't have a job". As a solution to the problem of two-tier system of disability benefits, Bruenig suggests guaranteeing a minimum Social Security Disability Insurance benefit to all people with disabilities that is equal to the federal poverty line regardless of work history, earnings, or assets. He also wrote an article about school reform, arguing that "we should do what tons of other countries do and make it easier to be a lawyer" rather than "creating massive barriers to entering the job of reading and writing arguments and following made up procedures".

Although commitment to an universal welfare state and competition policy are not mutually exclusive, Bruenig has been a critic of the anti-monopoly movement, such as the anti-trust New Brandeis movement. Critics like Bruenig and Matthew Yglesias refer to it as the anti-bigness movement. In 2018, Bruenig told Gilad Edelman that competition policy was for him "way down on the list of priorities". According to Edelman, among the American socialist left, with the exception of Ryan Cooper, "there seems to be a reluctance among the socialist left to engage with an agenda that promotes competition. What is the socialist answer to the dominance of Amazon, Facebook, and Google?" In a 2024 debate on The Nation, Bruenig argued that the government should buy the big corporations, citing the example of the Tennessee Valley Authority, contra Zephyr Teachout arguing that they should be broken up rather than nationalized.

== Personal life ==
Since 2014, Bruenig has been married to Elizabeth Bruenig (née Stoker), a staff writer for The Atlantic and formerly an opinion writer and editor at The Washington Post and The New York Times, whom he met in their high school debate team in Arlington. They have two children, and also host together The Bruenigs Podcast. In 2020, Bloomberg News reported that Bruenig was producing a podcast, alongside his wife, that generated about $9,000 per month from listeners.

Matt Bruenig was diagnosed as autistic in adulthood.

== See also ==
- History of the socialist movement in the United States
- Social welfare model
